= Bach cantata =

Cantatas by Johann Sebastian Bach

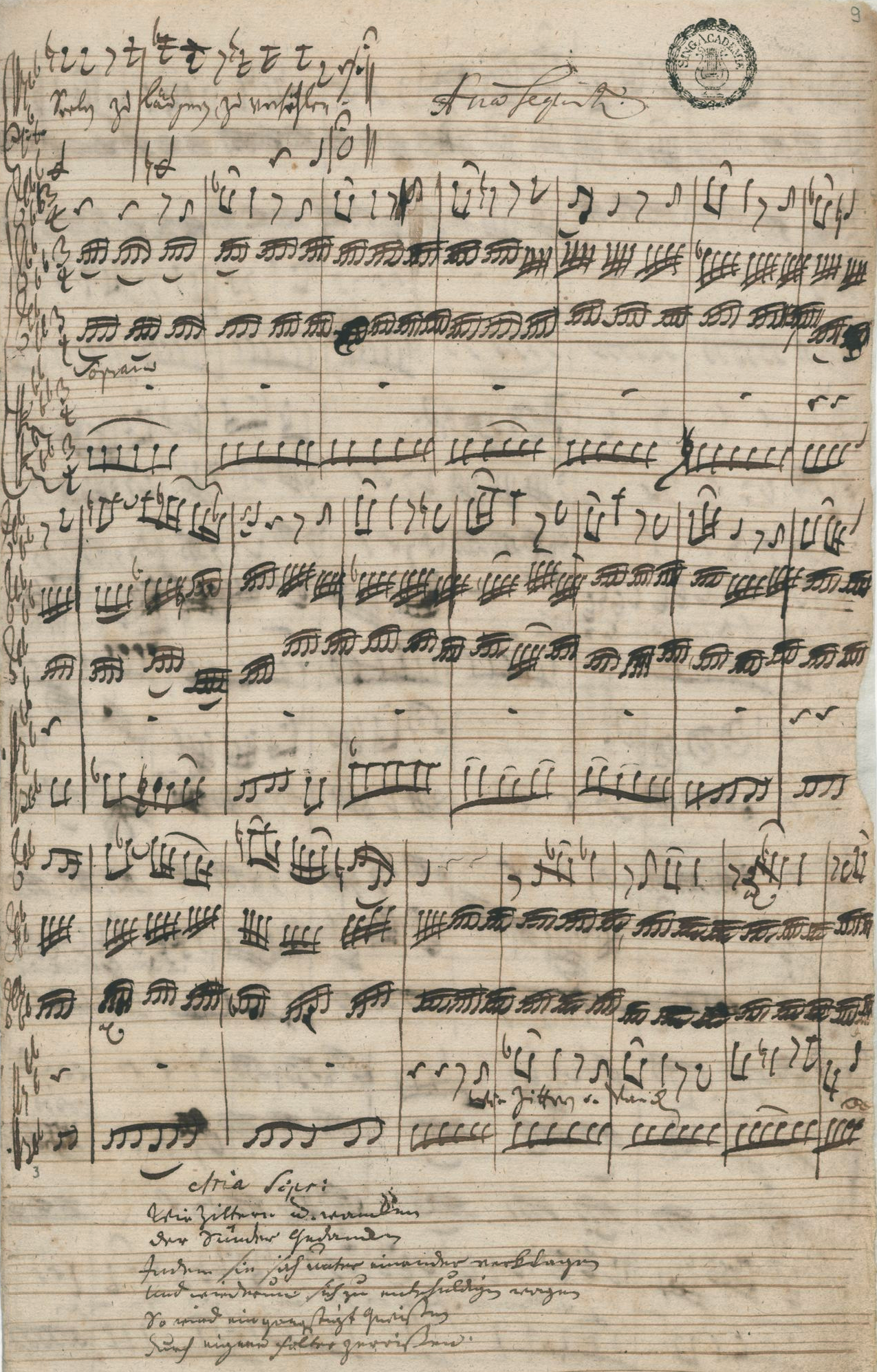
Bach's autograph of the soprano aria in the cantata Herr, gehe nicht ins Gericht mit deinem Knecht, BWV 105

The cantatas composed by Johann Sebastian Bach, known as Bach cantatas (German: Bachkantaten), are a body of work consisting of over 200 surviving independent works, and at least several dozen that are considered lost. As far as known, Bach's earliest cantatas date from 1707, the year he moved to Mühlhausen, although he may have begun composing them at his previous post in Arnstadt. Most of Bach's church cantatas date from his first years as Thomaskantor and director of church music in Leipzig, a position which he took up in 1723.

Working for Leipzig's Thomaskirche and Nikolaikirche, it was part of Bach's job to perform a church cantata every Sunday and holiday, conducting soloists, the Thomanerchor and orchestra as part of the church service. In his first years in Leipzig, starting after Trinity of 1723, Bach regularly composed a new cantata every week, although some of these cantatas were adapted (at least in part) from work he had composed before his Leipzig era. Works from three annual cycles of cantatas for the liturgical calendar have survived. These relate to the readings prescribed by the Lutheran liturgy for the specific occasion. The last known cantata was composed in 1745.

In addition to the church cantatas composed for occasions of the liturgical year, Bach wrote sacred cantatas for functions like weddings or Ratswahl (the inauguration of a new town council). His secular cantatas, around 50 known works, less than half of which surviving with both text and music, were written for academic functions of the University of Leipzig, or anniversaries and entertainment among the nobility and in society, some of them Glückwunschkantaten (congratulatory cantatas) and Huldigungskantaten (homage cantatas).

Bach's cantatas usually require four soloists and a four-part choir, but he also wrote solo cantatas (i.e. for one soloist singer) and dialogue cantatas for two singers. The words of Bach's cantatas, almost always entirely in German, consist mostly of 18th-century poetry, Lutheran hymns and dicta. Hymns were mostly set to their Lutheran chorale tune. His chorale cantata cycle contains at least 40 chorale cantatas, each of these entirely based on text and tune of such hymn.

== Titles of the cantatas ==
Although the German term Bachkantate (Bach cantata) became very familiar, Bach himself rarely used the title Cantata in his manuscripts. In Ich will den Kreuzstab gerne tragen, BWV 56, he wrote Cantata à Voce Sola e Stromenti (Cantata for solo voice and instruments). Another cantata in which Bach used that term is Ich bin vergnügt mit meinem Glücke, BWV 84. Typically, he began a heading with the abbreviation J.J. (Jesu juva, "Jesus, help"), followed by the name of the celebration, the beginning of the words and the instrumentation, for example in Gloria in excelsis Deo, BWV 191. The term "Concerto" also appears in the headings of many of the scores. Bach often signed his cantatas with SDG, short for Soli Deo Gloria ("glory to the only God" / "glory to God alone").

Bach often wrote a title page for the autograph score and copies of the original parts. For example, he titled the parts of Aus tiefer Not schrei ich zu dir, BWV 38, using a mix of languages to describe the occasion, the incipit, the precise scoring and his name: "Dominica 21. post Trinit / Aus tieffer Noth schrey ich zu dir. / â / 4. Voc. / 2. Hautbois. / 2. Violini. / Viola. / 4. Tromboni / e / Continuo. / di / Signore / J.S.Bach". The occasion for which the piece was performed is given first, in Latin: "Dominica 21. post Trinit" (21st Sunday after Trinity Sunday, with Trinit short for Trinitatem). The title follows, given in German in the orthography of Bach's time. The scoring and finally his name appear in a mix of French and Italian, the common languages among musicians at the time, partly abbreviated.

== BWV number ==
Bach wrote more than 200 cantatas, of which many have survived. In the Bach-Werke-Verzeichnis (BWV), Wolfgang Schmieder assigned them each a number within groups: 1–200 (sacred cantatas), 201–216 (secular cantatas), and 217–224 (cantatas of doubtful authorship). Since Schmieder's designation, several of the cantatas he thought authentic have been redesignated as "spurious." However, the spurious cantatas retain their BWV numbers. The List of Bach cantatas is organized by BWV number but sortable by other criteria.

== Structure of a Bach cantata ==
A typical Bach cantata of his first year in Leipzig follows the scheme:

1. Opening chorus
2. Recitative
3. Aria
4. Recitative (or Arioso)
5. Aria
6. Chorale

The opening chorus (Eingangschor) is usually a polyphonic setting, with the orchestra presenting the themes or contrasting material first. Most arias follow the form of a da capo aria, repeating the first part after a middle section. The final chorale is typically a homophonic setting of a traditional melody.

Bach used an expanded structure to take up his position in Leipzig with the cantatas Die Elenden sollen essen, BWV 75, and Die Himmel erzählen die Ehre Gottes, BWV 76, both in two parts, to be performed before and after the sermon (post orationem) and during communion (sub communione). Each part is a sequence of an opening movement, five movements with alternating recitatives and arias, and a chorale. In an exemplary way both cantatas cover the prescribed readings: starting with a related psalm from the Old Testament, Part I reflects the Gospel and Part II the Epistle.

Bach did not follow any strict scheme but composed as he wanted to express the words. A few cantatas are opened by an instrumental piece before the first chorus, such as the Sinfonia of Wir danken dir, Gott, wir danken dir, BWV 29. A solo movement begins Gott, man lobet dich in der Stille, BWV 120, instead of a chorus, perhaps because its first words speak of silence. Many cantatas composed in Weimar are set like chamber music, mostly for soloists, with a four-part setting only in the closing chorale, which may have been sung by the soloists. In an early cantata, Erschallet, ihr Lieder, erklinget, ihr Saiten! BWV 172, Bach marked a repeat of the opening chorus after the chorale.

The chorale can be as simple as a traditional four-part setting, or be accompanied by an obbligato instrument, or be accompanied by the instruments of the opening chorus or even expanded by interludes based on its themes, or have the homophonic vocal parts embedded in an instrumental concerto as in the familiar Herz und Mund und Tat und Leben, BWV 147, or have complex vocal parts embedded in the concerto as in Ärgre dich, o Seele, nicht, BWV 186, in a form called Choralphantasie (chorale fantasia). In Nun komm, der Heiden Heiland, BWV 61, for the first Sunday in Advent, the beginning of a new liturgical year, he rendered the opening chorus as a French overture.

== Singers and instrumentation ==
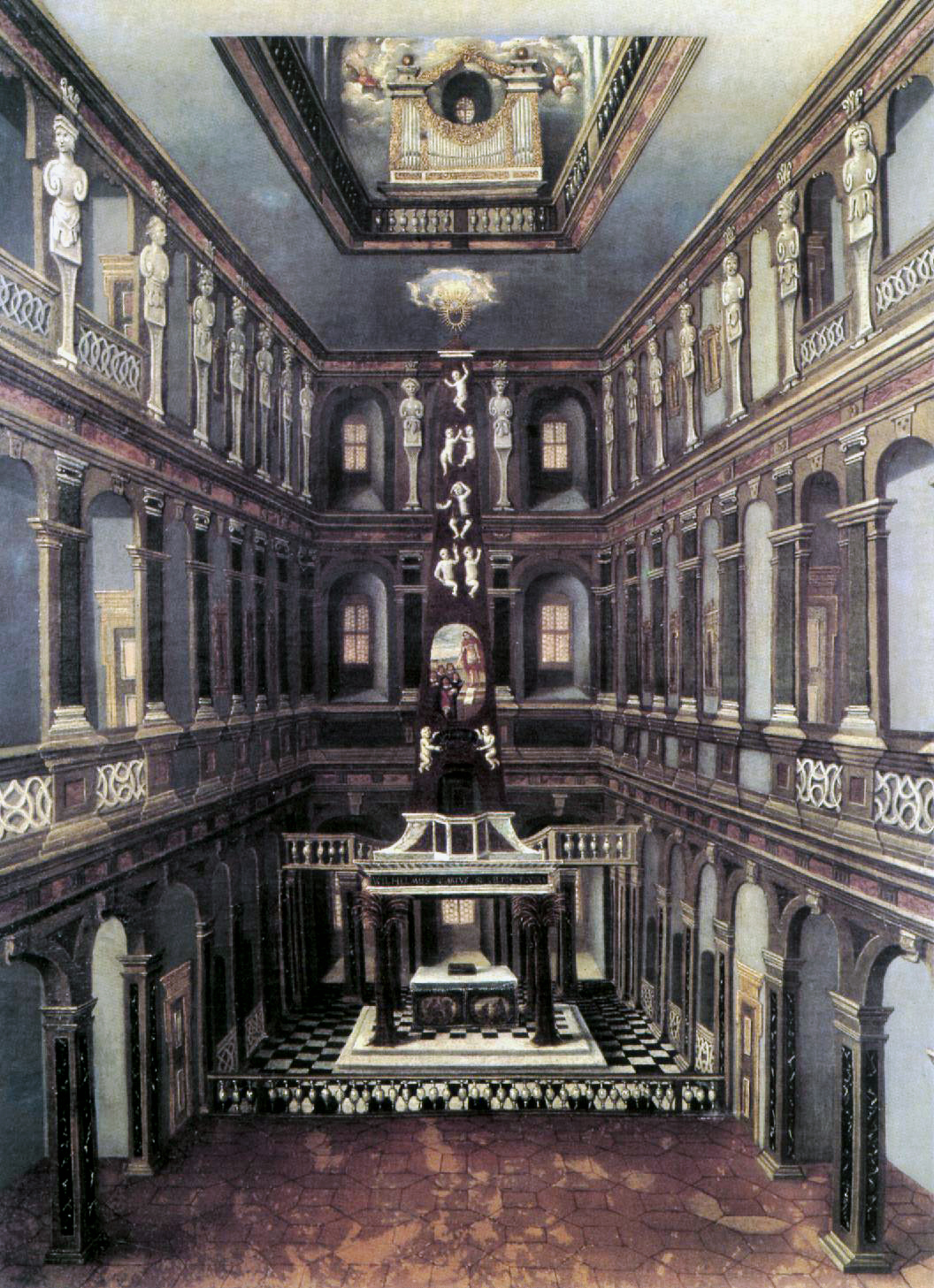
Schlosskirche in Weimar (c. 1660, burned 1774) where Bach composed and performed church cantatas monthly from 1714 to 1717

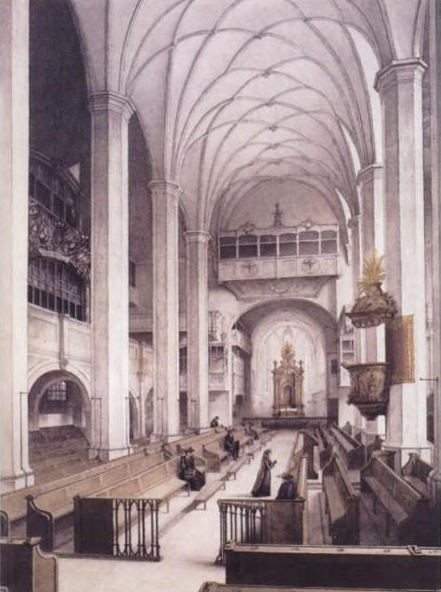
Thomaskirche in 1885, one of the two Leipzig churches where Bach composed and performed church cantatas almost weekly from 1723 to 1726

=== Vocal ===
Typically Bach employs soprano, alto, tenor and bass soloists and a four-part choir, also SATB. He sometimes assigns the voice parts to the dramatic situation, for example soprano for innocence or alto for motherly feelings. The bass is often the vox Christi, the voice of Jesus, when Jesus is quoted directly, as in Es wartet alles auf dich, BWV 187, or indirectly, as in O Ewigkeit, du Donnerwort, BWV 60.

In the absence of clear documentary evidence, there are different options as to how many singers to deploy per part in choral sections. This is reflected in the recordings discussed below. Ton Koopman, for example, is a conductor who has recorded a complete set of the cantatas and who favours a choir with four singers per part. On the other hand, some modern performances and recordings use one voice per part. Joshua Rifkin is well known is an advocate of this approach, although it has yet to be followed through in a complete set of cantatas. Nonetheless, Bach would have had more singers available at Leipzig, for example, while the space in the court chapel in Weimar was limited. One size of choir probably does not fit all the cantatas.

=== Instrumental ===
The orchestra that Bach used is based on string instruments (violin, viola) and basso continuo, typically played by cello, violone (at the same octave) and organ. A continuo bass is the rule in Baroque music; its absence is noteworthy and often has a special reason, such as describing fragility.

The specific character of a cantata or a single movement is rather defined by wind instruments, such as oboe, oboe da caccia, oboe d'amore, flauto traverso, recorder, trumpet, horn, trombone, and timpani. In movements with winds, a bassoon usually joins the continuo group.

Festive occasions call for richer instrumentation. Some instruments also carry symbolic meaning, such as a trumpet, the royal instrument of the Baroque, for divine majesty and three trumpets for the Trinity. In an aria of BWV 172, addressing the Heiligste Dreifaltigkeit (Most holy Trinity), the bass is accompanied only by three trumpets and timpani.

In many arias Bach uses obbligato instruments, which accompany the singer as an equal partner. These instrumental parts are frequently set in virtuoso repetitive patterns called figuration. Instruments include, in addition to the ones mentioned, organ, flauto piccolo (sopranino recorder), violino piccolo, viola d'amore, violoncello piccolo (a smaller cello), tromba da tirarsi (slide trumpet) and corno da tirarsi.

In his early compositions Bach also used instruments that had become old-fashioned, such as viola da gamba. Alto recorders (flauti dolci) are sometimes used in connection with death and mourning as in Gottes Zeit ist die allerbeste Zeit, BWV 106.

=== Solo cantata ===
Some cantatas are composed for a solo singer (Solokantate), as Jauchzet Gott in allen Landen, BWV 51, for soprano, sometimes concluded by a chorale, as in Ich will den Kreuzstab gerne tragen, BWV 56, for bass. Some of them, like the latter one, use a choir for a closing chorale.

==== Dialogue cantata ====
A special form of the solo cantata is a dialogue of two solo voices, mostly for Jesus and the Soul (bass and soprano), set like miniature operas. Bach titled them for example Concerto in Dialogo, concerto in dialogue. An early example is Tritt auf die Glaubensbahn, BWV 152 (1714). He composed four such works in his third annual cycle, Selig ist der Mann, BWV 57 (1725), Liebster Jesu, mein Verlangen, BWV 32, Ich geh und suche mit Verlangen, BWV 49 (both 1726), and Ach Gott, wie manches Herzeleid, BWV 58 (1727).

== Text of Bach's sacred cantatas ==
Within the Lutheran liturgy, certain readings from the Bible were prescribed for every event during the church year; specifically, it was expected that an Epistel from an Epistle and Evangelium from a Gospel would be read. Music was expected for all Sundays and holidays except the quiet times (tempus clausum) of Advent and Lent; the cantatas were supposed to reflect the readings. Ideally, a cantata text started with an Old Testament quotation related to the readings, and reflected both the Epistle and the Gospel, as in the exemplary Die Himmel erzählen die Ehre Gottes, BWV 76. Most of the solo movements are based on poetry of contemporary writers, such as court poet Salomon Franck in Weimar or Georg Christian Lehms or Picander in Leipzig, with whom Bach collaborated. The final words were usually a stanza from a chorale. Bach's Chorale cantatas are based exclusively on one chorale, for example the early Christ lag in Todes Banden, BWV 4, and most cantatas of his second annual cycle in Leipzig.

The German text may pose difficulties in translation and comprehension. Sometimes caused by archaic language, these issues are also a result of the different social context of modern artists and listeners, who do not share the same biblical and theological knowledge and perspectives as Bach or his audience.

== Periods of cantata composition ==
The following lists of works (some marked as questioned) rely mainly on Alfred Dürr's Die Kantaten von Johann Sebastian Bach. Usually the cantatas appear in the year of their first performance, sometimes also for later performances and then in brackets.

=== Mühlhausen ===
Bach moved to Mühlhausen in 1707 when he was 22 to take up an appointment as the organist of St. Blasius church (Divi Blasii). There is evidence suggesting that he composed a cantata as an audition piece for Mühlhausen, and this may have been Christ lag in Todes Banden, BWV 4. One or two more surviving cantatas may have been composed while Bach was at his previous post in Arnstadt, for example, Nach dir, Herr, verlanget mich, BWV 150.

A couple of the surviving cantatas can be firmly dated to his time in Mühlhausen. For example, Gott ist mein König, BWV 71, was composed for the inauguration of the town council in 1708. By Bach's own account, Aus der Tiefen rufe ich, Herr, zu dir, BWV 131, was also composed at Mühlhausen. Other cantatas are assumed to date from this period:

- Lobe den Herrn, meine Seele, BWV 143, related to Psalm 146, likely for New Year's Day
- Der Herr denket an uns, BMV 196, assumed to be a wedding cantata
- Gottes Zeit ist die allerbeste Zeit, BWV 106, a funeral cantata

=== Weimar ===
Bach worked in Weimar from 1708. He composed a secular cantata, Was mir behagt, ist nur die muntre Jagd, BWV 208, in 1713. The composition of cantatas for the Schlosskirche (court chapel) on a regular monthly basis started with his promotion to Konzertmeister in March 1714. His goal was to compose a complete set of cantatas for the liturgical year within four years. The cantatas 54 and 199 were performed within the cycle but possibly composed earlier.

- 1713: Gleichwie der Regen und Schnee vom Himmel fällt, BWV 18? * 63?
- 1714: Himmelskönig, sei willkommen, BWV 182 * Weinen, Klagen, Sorgen, Zagen, BWV 12 * 172 * 21 * 54 * 199 * 61 * 152
- 1715: Der Himmel lacht! Die Erde jubilieret, BWV 31 * 165 * 185 * 162 * 163 * 132
- 1716: Mein Gott, wie lang, ach lange? BWV 155 * 161 * 80a *70a * 186a * 147a

=== Köthen ===
Bach worked in Köthen from 1717 to 1723, where he composed for example the Brandenburg Concertos. He had no responsibility for church music, but his employer Prince Leopold did commission secular cantatas. Later in Leipzig, he derived several church cantatas from congratulatory cantatas, such as Erfreut euch, ihr Herzen, BWV 66, for Easter from the birthday cantata Der Himmel dacht auf Anhalts Ruhm und Glück, BWV 66a.

- 1717?: Durchlauchtster Leopold, BWV 173a (or between 1720 and 1722)
- 1718: Der Himmel dacht auf Anhalts Ruhm und Glück, BWV 66a
- 1719: Die Zeit, die Tag und Jahre macht, BWV 134a

Even after he moved to Leipzig he retained his title of Fürstlich Köthenischer Kapellmeister (that is director of music to the court at Köthen). He continued to compose for the court until Leopold's funeral in 1729. There is evidence that he reused musical material from works that he premiered in Leipzig in the 1720s, for example the secular cantata Schwingt freudig euch empor, BWV 36.1, believed to have been composed to honour one of the Bach's academic colleagues in Leipzig, was the basis of a secular cantata with a text in honour of Leopold's second wife.

- 1726: Steigt freudig in die Luft, BWV 36a
- 1729: Klagt, Kinder, klagt es aller Welt, BWV 244a

=== Leipzig ===
In Leipzig Bach was responsible for the town's church music in the Thomaskirche and Nikolaikirche and was head of the Thomasschule. Church cantata performances alternated in the two churches for ordinary Sundays and took place in both churches on high holidays such as Christmas, then one in the morning, one in the afternoon, and again alternating for the three days such an occasion was celebrated. Academic functions took place at the Universitätskirche St. Pauli. There is debate whether Bach performed Wer mich liebet, der wird mein Wort halten, BWV 59, there a week before he began his cantorate. Bach started it on the first Sunday after Trinity of 1723 and wrote a first annual cycle. Bach's major works such as the Passions and the Mass in B minor are inserted in the listing for comparison.

- 1723: Jesus nahm zu sich die Zwölfe, BWV 22 * Du wahrer Gott und Davids Sohn, BWV 23 (audition pieces)

==== First cantata cycle ====
- 1723: Die Elenden sollen essen, BWV 75 * 76 * (21) * 24 * 167 * 147 * Magnificat * 186 * 136 * 105 * 46 * 179 * (199) * 69a * 77 * 25 * 119 * 138 * 95 * 148 * 48 * (162) * 109 * 89 * (163?) * 60 * 90 * 70 * (61) * (63) * 40 * 64
- 1724: Singet dem Herrn ein neues Lied, BWV 190 * 153 * 65 * 154 * (155) * 73 * 81 * 83 * 144 * 181 + (18) * (22 23) * (182) * St John Passion * (4) * 66 * 134 * 67 * 104 * (12) * 166 * 86 * 37 * 44 * 59 * 173 * 184 * 194

==== Second cantata cycle ====
After Trinity of 1724 he started a second annual cycle of mainly chorale cantatas. The chorale was typically the chorale prescribed for that week (Hauptlied or Wochenlied). These cantatas were performed even after his death, according to Christoph Wolff probably because the well-known hymns were appealing to the audience.

- 1724: O Ewigkeit, du Donnerwort, BWV 20 * 2 * 7 * 135 * 10 * 93 * 107 * 178 * 94 * 101 * 113 * 33 * 78 * 99 * 8 * 130 * 114 * 96 * 5 * 180 * 38 * 115 * 139 * 26 * 116 * 62 * 91 * 121 * 133 * 122
- 1725: Jesu, nun sei gepreiset, BWV 41 * 123 * 124 * 3 * 111 * 92 * 125 * 126 * 127 * 1

The new cantatas Bach composed for Easter of 1725 and afterwards were not chorale cantatas:

- 1725: BWV 249, early version (later versions known as the Easter Oratorio but the 1725 version was a cantata) * 6 * 42 * 85 * 103 * 108 * 87 * 128 * 183 * 74 * 68 * 175 * 176

Two of these, BWV 128 and BWV 68, both starting with a chorale fantasia, are sometimes seen as included in the chorale cantata cycle.

Other cantatas by Bach that are usually seen as belonging to the chorale cantata cycle:

- BWV 4 (version as performed again at Easter 1725, somewhat different from the early Mühlhausen version) * 137 (1725) * 58 (1727) * 129 (1727) * 80 (1727 or later, although an early version of this cantata, BWV 80b, may have been composed for or performed on Reformation Day in 1724) * 112 (1731) * 140 (1731) * 177 (1732) * 9 (1732) * 14 (1735)

For four further chorale cantatas it is unclear for which occasion they were composed, and whether they were intended to be added to the cycle:

- BWV 117 (1728–1731) * 192 (1730) * 100 (1732–1735) * 97 (1734?)

==== Third to fifth year in Leipzig ====
After Trinity of 1725 Bach began a third annual cycle, but with less consistency. The first cantata is written for the ninth Sunday after Trinity, but the following year he added a substantial work for the first Sunday after Trinity. The cycle extends over several years, although the cantatas from 1727 have been termed as "between the third and fourth cycles". Cantatas for some occasions are not extant.

Between Trinity and Advent 1725 (apart from chorale cantatas):
- Trinity IX: BWV 168
- Trinity XIII: BWV 164
- Reformation Day: BWV 79
Liturgical year from Advent 1725 to the last Sunday after Trinity 1726 (includes 18 cantatas by Johann Ludwig Bach (JLB)):
- Christmas: BWV 110
- Christmas 2: BWV 57
- Christmas 3: BWV 151
- Christmas I: BWV 28
- New Year: BWV 16
- Epiphany I: BWV 32
- Epiphany II: BWV 13
- Epiphany III: BWV 72
- Purification: JLB 9
- Epiphany IV: JLB 1
- Epiphany V: JLB 2
- Septuagesima: JLB 3
- Sexagesima: JLB 4
- Estomihi: JLB 5
- Easter: JLB 21 (a.k.a. BWV 15)
- Easter 2: JLB 10
- Easter 3: JLB 11
- Easter I: JLB 6
- Easter II: JLB 12
- Easter III: JLB 8 (+BWV 146?)
- Easter IV: JLB 14
- Ascension: BWV 43
- Trinity I: BWV 39
- St. John's Day: JLB 17
- Visitation: JLB 13
- Trinity V: BWV 88
- Trinity VI: BWV 170 and JLB 7
- Trinity VII: BWV 187
- Trinity VIII: BWV 45
- Trinity X: BWV 102
- Trinity XI: JLB 15
- Trinity XII: BWV 35
- Trinity XIII: JLB 16
- Trinity XIV: BWV 17
- St. Michael's Day: BWV 19
- Trinity XVI: BWV 27
- Trinity XVII: BWV 47
- Trinity XVIII: BWV 169
- Trinity XIX: BWV 56
- Trinity XX: BWV 49
- Trinity XXI: BWV 98
- Trinity XXII: BWV 55
- Trinity XXIII: BWV 52
Church cantatas of 1727 (apart from chorale cantatas):
- New Year I: BWV 58
- Purification: BWV 82
- Septuagesima: BWV 84
- Pentecost: BWV 34
- Pentecost 2: BWV 173
Other:
- Passions performed in this period: St Mark Passion, BC D 5b (1726), St Matthew Passion, BWV 244b (1727?) and St. John Passion, BWV 245 (1728?)
- Chorale cantatas: BWV 137 (Trinity XII), 129 (Trinity) and 117
- Council election: BWV Anh. 4 and possibly BWV 193
- Wedding: BWV 34a and 195
- Funeral: BWV 157 and motet BWV 228
- Motet for New Year BWV 225
Secular cantatas:
- BWV 205
- Anh. 196
- 36a
- 249b
- 207
- 204
- Anh. 9
- 193a
- 198
- 216

==== Picander cycle of 1728–29 ====
There is some circumstantial evidence that a complete fourth cycle of Bach cantatas, in scholarship indicated as the Picander cycle, may have existed.

Extant cantatas of the fourth cycle:

- 1728: 149 * 188 * 197a * 117
- 1729: Gott, wie dein Name, so ist auch dein Ruhm, BWV 171 * O angenehme Melodei, BWV 210a * Klagt, Kinder, klagt es aller Welt, BWV 244a * 156 * 159 * 145 * 174

==== Other cantatas and church music ====
Not belonging to the foregoing:

- 1730: Jauchzet Gott in allen Landen, BWV 51
- 1731: Wir danken dir, Gott, wir danken dir, BWV 29 * Schwingt freudig euch empor, BWV 36
- 1732: Ich ruf zu dir, Herr Jesu Christ, BWV 177 * Was Gott tut, das ist wohlgetan, BWV 100
- 1733: Kyrie–Gloria Mass, BWV 232 I (early version) * Laßt uns sorgen, laßt uns wachen, BWV 213
- 1734: Preise dein Glücke, gesegnetes Sachsen, BWV 215 * Christmas Oratorio
- 1735: Lobet Gott in seinen Reichen, BWV 11 (Ascension Oratorio)
- 1738?: Kyrie–Gloria Masses, BWV 233–236
- 1742: Gott, man lobet dich in der Stille, BWV 120 * Mer hahn en neue Oberkeet, BWV 212
- 1744?: O holder Tag, erwünschte Zeit, BWV 210
- 1745: Gloria in excelsis Deo, BWV 191
- 1748?: Mass in B minor, BWV 232 (largely a compilation of previously composed music)

== Parodies ==
Bach sometimes reused an earlier composition, typically revising and improving it in a process called parody. For example, a movement from a partita for violin, in ceaseless motion, was arranged as an orchestral sinfonia with the organ as solo instrument for the wedding cantata 120a and again in Cantata 29, for which the organ was accompanied by a full orchestra dominated by trumpets. Not only a single movement but a complete cantata was reworked from the Shepherd cantata Entfliehet, verschwindet, entweichet, ihr Sorgen, BWV 249a, to become the Easter Oratorio. Bach used parody to be able to deliver cantatas for Christmas, Easter and Pentecost, which were each celebrated for a period of three days. His Easter cantata Ein Herz, das seinen Jesum lebend weiß, BWV 134, is a parody of six of eight movements of the cantata for New Year's Day, Die Zeit, die Tag und Jahre macht, BWV 134a. Six movements of his congratulatory cantata Durchlauchtster Leopold, BWV 173a, form the cantata for Pentecost Monday of 1724, Erhöhtes Fleisch und Blut, BWV 173, while a seventh movement was made part of the cantata for Pentecost Tuesday of 1725, Er rufet seinen Schafen mit Namen, BWV 175.

Bach's four short masses are parodies of cantata movements; he used several movements of Siehe zu, daß deine Gottesfurcht nicht Heuchelei sei, BWV 179, for two of them. When he compiled his Mass in B minor, he again used many cantata movements, such as a part of Weinen, Klagen, Sorgen, Zagen, BWV 12, for the Crucifixus of the Credo.

== Oratorios ==
Bach's oratorios can be considered as expanded cantatas. They were also meant to be performed during church services. Distinct from the cantatas, a narrator, the Evangelist, tells a story in the exact Bible wording, while soloists and the choir have "roles" such as Mary or "the shepherds", in addition to reflective chorales or arias commenting on the story. The St Matthew Passion and the St John Passion were intended to be performed on Good Friday, before and after the sermon. The six parts of the Christmas Oratorio were intended to be performed on six feast days of the Christmas season, each part composed as a cantata with an opening chorus (except in Part 2) and a closing chorale.

== Performances by Bach ==
Bach composed the cantatas and performed them, conducting from the keyboard. The choir was the Thomanerchor, which also served the other main churches of Leipzig for which Bach was responsible. Cantatas, under his personal direction, were performed in the Nikolaikirche and in the Thomaskirche, alternating on ordinary Sundays. On high feast days, the same cantata was performed in the morning in one of these churches, in a vespers service in the other.

== Later performances and recordings ==
After Bach's death the cantatas fell into obscurity even more than his oratorios. There is some evidence for the chorale cantatas being performed at Leipzig after Bach's death, but the cantatas were little known until a society called the Bach-Gesellschaft began to publish the composer's complete works starting in 1851. Only one of the cantatas, Gott ist mein König, BWV 71, had been published during Bach's lifetime. The cantata Wie schön leuchtet der Morgenstern, BWV1, was selected as the first work to appear in the Bach-Gesellschaft-Ausgabe, the first complete edition.

In 1928, The New York Times reported the presentation in Paris of two secular Bach cantatas by opera soprano Marguerite Bériza and her company in staged productions, The Peasant Cantata and The Coffee Cantata. In 1931 a recording was made of a performance of Christ lag in Todes Banden, in Barcelona.

The number of performances and recordings increased in the decades after the Second World War. In the early 1950s Fritz Lehmann recorded several cantatas with the Berliner Motettenchor and the Berlin Philharmonic. From 1953, Max Thurn conducted for the broadcaster NDR a series of Bach cantatas, with members of the NDR Chor and members of the NDR Sinfonieorchester. Karl Richter called his choir programmatically Münchener Bach-Chor in 1954 and recorded about a third of the cantatas.

Between 1958 and 1987, the London Bach Society, conducted by Paul Steinitz performed all the extant church and secular cantatas, 208 separate works, in various venues, mostly in the Church of St Bartholomew-the-Great, London. Diethard Hellmann called the Kantorei (chorale) of the Christuskirche, Bachchor Mainz, in 1965 and produced more than 100 cantatas on a weekly basis with the Südwestrundfunk. Fritz Werner started recording with the Heinrich-Schütz-Chor Heilbronn and the Pforzheim Chamber Orchestra a series that they called Les Grandes Cantates de J.S. Bach.

The Thomanerchor has sung a weekly cantata during the evening service Motette on Saturday. The cantatas are also regularly performed on Sundays at Holy Trinity Lutheran Church, New York City, under the direction of the Cantor (currently Donald R. Meineke).

=== Complete recordings ===
While individual cantatas were recorded as early as the 1930s, a complete set was not attempted until the 1970s.

- Nikolaus Harnoncourt and Gustav Leonhardt began recording the Teldec set. This 20-year collaboration used historical instruments, with boys' choirs and boy soloists for most soprano and a few alto parts. Harnoncourt conducted the Wiener Sängerknaben or the Tölzer Knabenchor and the Concentus Musicus Wien. Leonhardt conducted the Tölzer Knabenchor, Knabenchor Hannover and the Collegium Vocale Gent, and the ensemble Leonhardt-Consort
- Helmuth Rilling, Gächinger Kantorei, and the Bach-Collegium Stuttgart completed a recording of the sacred cantatas and oratorios on Bach's 300th birthday, 21 March 1985.
- Ton Koopman and the Amsterdam Baroque Orchestra & Choir recorded all vocal works by Bach over ten years starting in 1994, including the cantatas.
- Pieter Jan Leusink recorded the complete cantatas in 15 months in 1999 and 2000 with the Holland Boys Choir and Netherlands Bach Collegium for Brilliant Classics.
- Sir John Eliot Gardiner and his Monteverdi Choir undertook the Bach Cantata Pilgrimage, performing and recording in the year 2000 the sacred cantatas at churches all over Europe and in the United States.
- Masaaki Suzuki commenced in 1995 a project to record the complete sacred cantatas with his Bach Collegium Japan for the Swedish label BIS; he completed the process in 2013.
- Sigiswald Kuijken has recorded Cantatas for the Complete Liturgical Year with La Petite Bande, with the soloists forming the choir.

== The Fifth Gospel ==
In 1929 the Swedish bishop Nathan Söderblom, a recipient of the Nobel Peace Prize, called Bach's cantatas the Fifth Gospel.

== Bach cantatas listed in the first chapter of the Bach-Werke-Verzeichnis (1998) ==
Legend to the table
column		content
1	BWV	Bach-Werke-Verzeichnis (lit. 'Bach-works-catalogue'; BWV) numbers. Anhang (Annex; Anh.) numbers are indicated as follows: preceded by I: in Anh. I (lost works) of BWV^{1} (1950 first edition of the BWV); preceded by II: in Anh. II (doubtful works) of BWV^{1}; preceded by III: in Anh. III (spurious works) of BWV^{1}; preceded by N: new Anh. numbers in BWV^{2} (1990) and/or BWV^{2a} (1998)
2	^{2a}	Section in which the composition appears in BWV^{2a}: Chapters of the main catalogue indicated by Arabic numerals (1-13); Anh. sections indicated by Roman numerals (I–III); Reconstructions published in the NBE indicated by "R"
3	Date	Date associated with the completion of the listed version of the composition. Exact dates (e.g. for most cantatas) usually indicate the assumed date of first (public) performance. When the date is followed by an abbreviation in brackets (e.g. JSB for Johann Sebastian Bach) it indicates the date of that person's involvement with the composition as composer, scribe or publisher.
4	Name	Name of the composition: if the composition is known by a German incipit, that German name is preceded by the composition type (e.g. cantata, chorale prelude, motet, ...)
5	Key	Key of the composition
6	Scoring	See scoring table below for the abbreviations used in this column
7	BG	Bach Gesellschaft-Ausgabe (BG edition; BGA): numbers before the colon indicate the volume in that edition. After the colon an Arabic numeral indicates the page number where the score of the composition begins, while a Roman numeral indicates a description of the composition in the Vorwort (Preface) of the volume.
8	NBE	New Bach Edition (German: Neue Bach-Ausgabe, NBA): Roman numerals for the series, followed by a slash, and the volume number in Arabic numerals. A page number, after a colon, refers to the "Score" part of the volume. Without such page number, the composition is only described in the "Critical Commentary" part of the volume. The volumes group Bach's compositions by genre: 1. Cantatas (Vol. 1–34: church cantatas grouped by occasion; Vol. 35–40: secular cantatas; Vol. 41: Varia); 2. Masses, Passions, Oratorios (12 volumes); 3. Motets, Chorales, Lieder (4 volumes); 4. Organ Works (11 volumes); 5. Keyboard and Lute Works (14 volumes); 6. Chamber Music (5 volumes); 7. Orchestral Works (7 volumes); 8. Canons, Musical Offering, Art of Fugue (3 volumes); 9. Addenda (approximately 7 volumes)
9	Additional info	may include: "after" – indicating a model for the composition; "by" – indicating the composer of the composition (if different from Johann Sebastian Bach); "in" – indicating the oldest known source for the composition; "pasticcio" – indicating a composition with parts of different origin; "see" – composition renumbered in a later edition of the BWV; "text" – by text author, or, in source; Provenance of standard texts and tunes, such as Lutheran hymns and their chorale melodies, Latin liturgical texts (e.g. Magnificat) and common tunes (e.g. Folia), are not usually indicated in this column. For an overview of such resources used by Bach, see individual composition articles, and overviews in, e.g., Chorale cantata (Bach)#Bach's chorale cantatas, List of chorale harmonisations by Johann Sebastian Bach#Chorale harmonisations in various collections and List of organ compositions by Johann Sebastian Bach#Chorale Preludes.
10	BD	Bach Digital Work page

Legend for abbreviations in "Scoring" column
Voices (see also SATB)
a	A	b	B	s	S	t	T	v			V	
alto (solo part)	alto (choir part)	bass (solo part)	bass (choir part)	soprano (solo part)	soprano (choir part)	tenor (solo part)	tenor (choir part)	voice (includes parts for unspecified voices or instruments as in some canons)			vocal music for unspecified voice type	
Winds and battery (bold = soloist)
Bas	Bel	Cnt	Fl	Hn	Ob	Oba	Odc	Tai	Tbn	Tdt	Tmp	Tr
bassoon (can be part of Bc, see below)	bell(s) (musical bells)	cornett, cornettino	flute (traverso, flauto dolce, piccolo, flauto basso)	natural horn, corno da caccia, corno da tirarsi, lituo	oboe	oboe d'amore	oboe da caccia	taille	trombone	tromba da tirarsi	timpani	tromba (natural trumpet, clarino trumpet)
Strings and keyboard (bold = soloist)
Bc		Hc	Kb	Lu	Lw	Org	Str	Va	Vc	Vdg	Vl	Vne
basso continuo: Vdg, Hc, Vc, Bas, Org, Vne and/or Lu		harpsichord	keyboard (Hc, Lw, Org or clavichord)	lute, theorbo	Lautenwerck (lute-harpsichord)	organ (/man. = manualiter, without pedals)	strings: Vl I, Vl II and Va	viola(s), viola d'amore, violetta	violoncello, violoncello piccolo	viola da gamba	violin(s), violino piccolo	violone, violone grosso

Background colours
Colour	Meaning
green	extant or clearly documented partial or complete manuscript (copy) by Bach and/or first edition under Bach's supervision
yellow	extant or clearly documented manuscript (copy) or print edition, in whole or in part, by close relative, i.e. brother (J. Christoph), wife (A. M.), son (W. F. / C. P. E. / J. C. F. / J. Christian) or son-in-law (Altnickol)
orange-brown	extant or clearly documented manuscript (copy) by close friend and/or pupil (Kellner, Krebs, Kirnberger, Walther, ...), or distant family member

Bach cantatas in Chapter 1 of BWV^{2a}
BWV	^{2a}	Date	Name	Key	Scoring	BG	NBE	Additional info	BD
1	1.	1725-03-25	Cantata Wie schön leuchtet der Morgenstern (Annunciation)	F maj.	stbSATB 2Hn 2Odc 2**Vl** Str Bc	1: 1	I/28.2: 3	after Z 8359; text after Nicolai	00001
2	1.	1724-06-18	Cantata Ach Gott, vom Himmel sieh darein (Trinity II)	G min.	atbSATB 4Tbn 2Ob Str Bc	1: 53	I/16: 81	after Z 4431; text after Luther	00002
2/6	1.	1724-06-18	chorale setting "Ach Gott, vom Himmel sieh darein" (s. 6)	G Dor.	SATB	1: 72	III/2.1: 25; III/2.2: 156	after Z 4431; text by Luther	11189
3	1.	1725-01-14	Cantata Ach Gott, wie manches Herzeleid (Epiphany II)	A maj.	satbSATB Hn Tbn 2Oba Str Bc	1: 73	I/5: 189	after Z 533a; text after Moller	00003
3/6	1.	1725-01-14	chorale setting "Ach Gott, wie manches Herzeleid" (s. 18)	A maj.	SATB	1: 94	III/2.1: 26; III/2.2: 90	after Z 533a; text by Moller	11191
4.2	1.	1724-04-09	Cantata Christ lag in Todes Banden (Easter)	E min.	satbSATB Cnt 3Tbn Str Bc	1: 95	I/9: 1	after BWV 4.1; text by Luther	00004
4/8	1.	1724-04-09	chorale setting "Christ lag in Todes Banden" (s. 7)	E min. D min.	SATB	1: 124	III/2.2: 104	after Z 7012a; text by Luther	11295
4.1	1.	1707-04-24	Cantata Christ lag in Todes Banden (Easter; early version, lost)		satbSATB 2Vl 2Va Bc		I/9	after Z 7012a; → BWV 4.2; text by Luther	00005
5	1.	1724-10-15	Cantata Wo soll ich fliehen hin (Trinity XIX)	G min.	satbSATB Tdt 2Ob Str Bc	1: 125	I/24: 133	after Z 2164; text after Heermann	00006
5/7	1.	1724-10-15	chorale setting "Wo soll ich fliehen hin" (s. 11)	G min.	SATB	1: 150	III/2.1: 66; III/2.2: 180	after Z 2164; text by Heermann	11232
5/7	1.	1724-10-15	chorale setting "Auf meinen lieben Gott"	G min.	SATB	1: 150	III/2.1: 66; III/2.2: 180	after Z 2164	11232
6	1.	1725-04-02	Cantata Bleib bei uns, denn es will Abend werden (Easter 2)	C min.	satbSATB 2Ob Odc Str Vc Bc	1: 151	I/10: 43	after Z 439 (/3: → BWV 649), Z 350a (/6); text after Lk 24:29 (/1), by Melanchthon & Selnecker (/3), Luther (/6)	00007
6/6	1.	1725-04-02	chorale setting "Erhalt uns, Herr, bei deinem Wort" (s. 2)	G min.	SATB	1: 176	III/2.2: 40	after Z 350a; text by Luther	11338
7	1.	1724-06-24	Cantata Christ unser Herr zum Jordan kam (24 June: feast of John the Baptist)	E min.	atbSATB 2Oba 2**Vl** Str Bc	1: 177	I/29: 25	after Z 7246; text after Luther	00008
8.1	1.	1724-09-24	Cantata Liebster Gott, wenn werd ich sterben? (Trinity XVI; 1st version)	E maj.	satbSATB Hn Fl 2Oba Str Bc	1: 211	I/23: 105	after Z 6634; by Vetter, D. (/6); text after Neumann; → BWV 8.2	00009
8.2	1.	1747-09-17	Cantata Liebster Gott, wenn werd ich sterben? (Trinity XVI; 2nd version)	D maj.	satbSATB Fl 2Oba Tai 2**Vl** Str Bc		I/23: 163	after BWV 8.1	00010
9	1.	1734-08-01	Cantata Es ist das Heil uns kommen her (Trinity VI)	E maj.	satbSATB Fl Oba Str Bc	1: 243	I/17.2: 83	after Z 4430; text after Speratus	00011
9/7	1.	1734-08-01	chorale setting "Es ist das Heil uns kommen her" (s. 12)	E maj.	SATB	1: 274	III/2.1: 52; III/2.2: 172	after Z 4430; text by Speratus	11213
10	1.	1724-07-02	Cantata Meine Seel erhebt den Herren a.k.a. German Magnificat (Visitation)	G min.	satbSATB Tr 2Ob Str Bc	1: 275	I/28.2: 131	after Magnificat peregrini toni; text after Magnificat; → BWV 648	00012
10/7	1.	1724-07-02	chorale setting "Meine Seel erhebt den Herren" (doxology, ss. 10–11)	G min.	SATB	1: 303	III/2.1: 82; III/2.2: 205	after Magnificat peregrini toni; text: German Magnificat	11248
12	1.	1714-04-22	Cantata Weinen, Klagen, Sorgen, Zagen (Jubilate; two versions)	F Dor.	atbSATB Tr Ob 2Vl 2Va Bas Bc	2: 59	I/11.2: 1	after Z 5629 (/7: → BWV 69.1/6); text by Franck, S.?; text after Acts 14:22 (/3); text by Rodigast (/7); /2 → BWV 232/14	00014
12	1.	1724-04-30	Cantata Weinen, Klagen, Sorgen, Zagen (Jubilate; two versions)	G min.	atbSATB Tr Ob 2Vl 2Va Bas Bc		I/11.2: 1	after Z 5629 (/7: → BWV 69.1/6); text by Franck, S.?; text after Acts 14:22 (/3); text by Rodigast (/7); /2 → BWV 232/14	00014
13	1.	1726-01-20	Cantata Meine Seufzer, meine Tränen (Epiphany II)	D min.	satbSATB 2Fl Odc Str Bc	2: 79	I/5: 229	after Z 6543 (/3), Z 2293b (/6); text by Lehms, Heermann (/3), Fleming (/6)	00015
13/6	1.	1726-01-20	chorale setting "In allen meinen Taten" (s. 9)	B♭ maj.	SATB	2: 98	III/2.2: 58	after Z 2293b; text by Fleming	11347
13/6	1.	1726-01-20	chorale setting "Nun ruhen alle Wälder"	G maj.	SATB		III/2.2: 216	after Z 2293b; text by Fleming	11347
14	1.	1735-01-30	Cantata Wär Gott nicht mit uns diese Zeit (Epiphany IV)	G min.	stbSATB Hn 2Ob Str Bc	2: 99	I/6: 139	after Z 4434; text after Luther	00016
14/5	1.	1735-01-30	chorale setting "Wär Gott nicht mit uns diese Zeit" (s. 3)	G min.	SATB	2: 132	III/2.1: 88; III/2.2: 103	after Z 4434; text by Luther	11250
16	1.	1726-01-01	Cantata Herr Gott, dich loben wir (New Year/Circumcision)	A min.	atbSATB Hn 2Ob Odc Str Bc	2: 173	I/4: 103	after Z 8652 (/1), 5267 (/6; → BWV 419); text by Lehms, Luther (/1), Eber (/6)	00018
16	1.	1731-01-01	Cantata Herr Gott, dich loben wir (New Year/Circumcision)	A min.	atbSATB Hn 2Ob Va Str Bc	2: 173	I/4: 103	after Z 8652 (/1), 5267 (/6; → BWV 419); text by Lehms, Luther (/1), Eber (/6)	00018
16/6	1.	1726-01-01	chorale setting "Helft mir Gotts Güte preisen" (s. 6)	A min.	SATB	2: 198	III/2.2: 56	after Z 5267; text by Eber	11324
17	1.	1726-09-22	Cantata Wer Dank opfert, der preiset mich (Trinity XIV)	A maj.	satbSATB 2Ob Str Bc	2: 199	I/21: 147	after Z 8244 (/7); text: Meiningen, after Ps 50:23 (/1; → BWV 236/6), Lk 17:15–16 (/4), by Gramann (/7)	00019
17/7	1.	1726-09-22	chorale setting "Nun lob, mein Seel, den Herren" (s. 3)	A maj.	SATB	2: 225	III/2.2: 4	after Z 8244; text by Gramann	11330
18.2	1.	1724-02-13	Cantata Gleichwie der Regen und Schnee vom Himmel fällt (Sexagesima)	A min.	stbSATB 2Fl Bas 4Va Vc Bc	2: 227 (in g)	I/7: 107	after BWV 18.1; text by Neumeister, after Is 55:10–11 (/2), Luther (/3), by Spengler (/5)	00020
18/5	1.	1724-02-13	chorale setting "Durch Adams Fall ist ganz verderbt" (s. 8)	A min.	SATB	2: 252 (in g)	III/2.2: 71	after Z 7549; text by Spengler	11301
18/5	1.	1715-02-24	chorale setting "Ich ruf zu dir, Herr Jesu Christ"	G min.	SATB	2: 252 (in g)	III/2.2: 56	after Z 7549; text by Agricola	11301
18.1	1.	1715-02-24	Cantata Gleichwie der Regen und Schnee vom Himmel fällt (Sexagesima)	G min.	stbSATB Bas 4Va Vc Bc		I/7: 81	after Z 7549 (/5); text by Neumeister, after Is 55:10–11 (/2), Luther (/3), by Spengler (/5); → BWV 18.2	00021
19	1.	1726-09-29	Cantata Es erhub sich ein Streit (Michaelmas)	C maj.	stbSATB 3Tr Tmp 2Ob 2Oba Tai Str Bc	2: 253	I/30: 55	after Z 6543 (/7); text after Picander	00022
19/7	1.	1726-09-29	chorale setting "Freu dich sehr, o meine Seele" (s. 9)	C maj.	SATB	2: 288	III/2.1: 62; III/2.2: 177	after Z 6543	11227
19/7	1.	1726-09-29	chorale setting "Weg, mein Herz, mit den Gedanken"	C maj.	SATB	2: 288	III/2.1: 62; III/2.2: 177	after Z 6543; text by Gerhardt	11227
20	1.	1724-06-11	Cantata O Ewigkeit, du Donnerwort (Trinity I)	F maj.	atbSATB Tdt Tmp 3Ob Str Bc	2: 291	I/15: 133	after Z 5820; text after Rist	00023
20/7; 20/11	1.	1724-06-11	chorale setting "O Ewigkeit, du Donnerwort" (ss. 11, 16)	F maj.	SATB	2: 317, 327	III/2.2: 17	after Z 5820; text by Rist	11332
21.1	1.	before Dec. 1713	Cantata Ich hatte viel Bekümmernis (1st version: in ogni tempore; 1714-06-17: Trinity III)	C min.	satbSATB 3Tr Tmp Ob Str Bc		I/16: 109	after Z 2778 (/9); text by Franck, S.?; text after Ps 94:19 (/2), 42:12 (/6), 116:7 (/9), Rv 5:12–13 (/11), by Neumark (/9); → BWV 21.2	00024
21.2	1.	c. autumn 1720	Cantata Ich hatte viel Bekümmernis (2nd version: in ogni tempore)	D min.	satbSATB 3Tr Tmp Ob Str Bas Bc		I/16	after BWV 21.1 (same text); → BWV 21.3	00025
21.3	1.	1723-06-13	Cantata Ich hatte viel Bekümmernis (3rd version: Trinity III)	C min.	satbSATB 3Tr Tmp 4Tne Ob Str Bas Bc	5^{1}: 1	I/16	after BWV 21.2 (same text)	00026
22	1.	1723-02-07	Cantata Jesus nahm zu sich die Zwölfe (Estomihi)		satbSATB Ob Str Bc	5^{1}: 65	I/8: 1	after Z 4297a (/5); text after Luke 18:31, 34 (/1), by Cruciger (/5)	00027
23.1	1.	1723	Cantata Du wahrer Gott und Davids Sohn (1st version, 3 movements: Estomihi)	C min.	satbSATB 2Ob Str Bc	5^{1}: 93	I/8: 33	→ BWV 23.2, .3	00028
23.2	1.	1723-02-07	Cantata Du wahrer Gott und Davids Sohn (2nd version, 4 movements: Estomihi)	B min.	satbSATB Cnt 3Tbn 2Oba Str Bc		I/8: 69	after BWV 23.1, Z 58 (/4); text by Luther after Agnus Dei (/4); → BWV 23.3, 245.2/40	00029
23.3	1.	1728–1731	Cantata Du wahrer Gott und Davids Sohn (3rd version, 4 movements: Estomihi)	C min.	satbSATB 2Ob Str Bc	5^{1}: 93	I/8: 33	after BWV 23.1, .2; text by Luther after Agnus Dei (/4)	00030
24	1.	1723-06-20	Cantata Ein ungefärbt Gemüte (Trinity IV)	F maj.	satbSATB Tr 2Ob 2Oba Str Bc	5^{1}: 125	I/17.1: 47	after Z 5148 (/6); text by Neumeister, Heermann (/6), after Mt 7:12 (/3)	00031
24/6	1.	1723-06-20	chorale setting "O Gott, du frommer Gott" (s. 1)	F maj.	SATB	5^{1}: 150	III/2.2: 195	after Z 5148; text by Heermann	11333
24/6	1.	1723-06-20	chorale setting "Was frag ich nach der Welt"	F maj.	SATB	5^{1}: 150	III/2.2: 195	after Z 5148; text by Kindermann	11333
25	1.	1723-08-29	Cantata Es ist nichts Gesundes an meinem Leibe (Trinity XIV)	E min.	stbSATB Cnt 3Tbn 3Fl 2Ob Str Bc	5^{1}: 153	I/21: 79	after Z 6543 (/6); text after Rambach, Ps 38:4 (/1), by Heermann (/6)	00032
25/6	1.	1723-08-29	chorale setting "Treuer Gott, ich muss dir klagen" (s. 12)	C maj.	SATB	5^{1}: 188	III/2.1: 15; III/2.2: 150	after Z 6543; text by Heermann	11177
25/6	1.	1723-08-29	chorale setting "Weg, mein Herz, mit den Gedenken"	C maj.	SATB	5^{1}: 188	III/2.1: 15; III/2.2: 150	after Z 6543; text by Gerhardt	11177
25/6	1.	1723-08-29	chorale setting "Freu dich sehr, o meine Seele"	C maj.	SATB	5^{1}: 188	III/2.2: 168	after Z 6543	11177
26	1.	1724-11-19	Cantata Ach wie flüchtig, ach wie nichtig (Trinity XXIV)	A min.	satbSATB Hn Fl 3Ob Str Bc	5^{1}: 189	I/27: 29	after Z 1887b; text after Franck, M.	00033
26/6	1.	1724-11-19	chorale setting "Ach wie flüchtig, ach wie nichtig" (s. 8)	A min.	SATB	5^{1}: 216	III/2.2: 28	after Z 1887b; text by Franck, M.	11289
27	1.	1726-10-06	Cantata Wer weiß, wie nahe mir mein Ende? (Trinity XVI)	C min.	satbSSATB Hn 2Ob Odc Str Org Bc	5^{1}: 217	I/23: 221	after Z 2778 (/1); by Rosenmüller (/6 = BWV Anh. 170); text by E. J. of Schwarzburg-Rudolstadt (/1), Albinus (/6), after Neumeister (/3)	00034
28	1.	1725-12-30	Cantata Gottlob! nun geht das Jahr zu Ende (Christmas I)	A min.	satbSATB Cnt 3Tbn 2Ob Tai Str Bc	5^{1}: 245	I/3.2: 75	after Z 8244 (/2), 5267 (/6); text by Neumeister, Gramann (/2), Eber (/6), after Jer 32:41 (/3); → BWV 28/2a, Anh. 160/2	00035
28/6	1.	1725-12-30	chorale setting "Helft mir Gotts Güte preisen" (s. 12)	A min.	SATB	5^{1}: 272	III/2.1: 13; III/2.2: 49	after Z 5267; text by Eber	11175
28/6	1.	1725-12-30	chorale setting "Zeuch ein zu deinen Toren"	A min.	SATB	5^{1}: 272	III/2.2: 15	after Z 5267; text by Gerhardt	11175
28/2a	1.	1725?	Motet Sei Lob und Preis mit Ehren	C maj.	SATB	39: 167	III/3: 15	after BWV 28/2; ↔ Anh. 160/2; was BWV 231	00036
29	1.	1731-08-27	Cantata Wir danken dir, Gott, wir danken dir (council election)	D maj.	satbSATB 3Tr Tmp 2Ob Str Org Bc	5^{1}: 273	I/32.2: 1	after BWV 120.2/4 (/1), Z 8244 (/8); text after Ps 75:2 (/2; → BWV 232/7, /23), by Gramann (/8)	00037
29/8	1.	1731-08-27	chorale setting "Nun lob, mein Seel, den Herren" (s. 5)	D maj.	SATB	5^{1}: 316	III/2.2: 65	after Z 8244; text by Gramann	11331
30.2	1.	1738-06-24	Cantata Freue dich, erlöste Schar (24 June: feast of John the Baptist)	D maj.	satbSATB 2Fl 2Ob Oba **Vl** Str Bc	5^{1}: 321	I/29: 59	after BWV 30.1, Z 6543 (/6); text by Picander?, Olearius, J. (/6)	00038
30.2/6	1.	1738-06-24	chorale setting "Tröstet, tröstet, meine Lieben" (s. 3)	A maj.	SATB	5^{1}: 360	III/2.2: 42	after Z 6543; text by Olearius, J.	11318
30.2/6	1.	1738-06-24	chorale setting "Freu dich sehr, o meine Seele"	G maj.	SATB	5^{1}: 360	III/2.2: 42	after Z 6543	11318
30.1	1.	1737-09-28	Secular cantata Angenehmes Wiederau (for Hennicke at Wiederau manor)	D maj.	satbSATB 3Tr Tmp 2Fl 2Ob Oba Str Bc	5^{1}: 399; 34: 325	I/39: 51	text by Picander; → BWV 30.2, 195.2/6, /8	00039
31.2	1.	1724-04-09	Cantata Der Himmel lacht! Die Erde jubilieret (Leipzig version: Easter)	C maj.	stbSSATB 3Tr Tmp Ob 2Oba Bas 2Vl 2Va Bc	7: 1	I/9: 41	after BWV 31.1 (same text)	00040
31/9	1.	1724-04-09	chorale setting "Wenn mein Stündlein vorhanden ist" (s. 5)	C maj.	SATB	7: 50	III/2.1: 56	after Z 4482a; text by Herman	11221
31.1	1.	1715-04-21	Cantata Der Himmel lacht! Die Erde jubilieret (Weimar version: Easter)	C maj.	stbSSATB 3Tr Tmp 3Ob Tai Bas 2Vl 2Va Bc		I/9 rev 2: 37	after Z 4482a (/9); text by Franck, S, Herman (/9); → BWV 31.2	00041
32	1.	1726-01-13	Cantata Liebster Jesu, mein Verlangen (Epiphany I)	E min.	sbSATB Ob Str Bc	7: 53	I/5: 143	after Z 6543 (/6); text by Lehms, Gerhardt (/6)	00042
32/6	1.	1726-01-13	chorale setting "Weg, mein Herz, mit den Gedenken" (s. 12)	G maj.	SATB	7: 80	III/2.2: 18	after Z 6543; text by Gerhardt	11317
32/6	1.	1726-01-13	chorale setting "Freu dich sehr, o meine Seele"	G maj.	SATB	7: 80	III/2.2: 18	after Z 6543	11317
33	1.	1724-09-03	Cantata Allein zu dir, Herr Jesu Christ (Trinity XIII)	A min.	atbSATB 2Ob Str Bc	7: 81	I/21: 23	after Z 7292b; text after Hubert	00043
33/6	1.	1724-09-03	chorale setting "Allein zu dir, Herr Jesu Christ" (s. 4)	A min.	SATB	7: 114	III/2.1: 58; III/2.2: 10	after Z 7292b; text by Hubert	11223
34.1	1.	1727-06-01	Cantata O ewiges Feuer, o Ursprung der Liebe (Pentecost)	D maj.	atbSATB 3Tr Tmp 2Fl 2Ob Str Bc	7: 115	I/13: 129	text after Ps 128:6 (/5); → BWV 34.2	00044
34.2	1.	after 1727	Cantata O ewiges Feuer, o Ursprung der Liebe (wedding; incomplete)	D maj.	satbSATB Vl Va Bc	41: 117	I/33: 27	after BWV 34.1; text after Ps 128:4–6 (/3–/4), Nm 6:24–26 (/7)	00045
35	1.	1726-09-08	Cantata Geist und Seele wird verwirret (Trinity XII)	D min.	a 2Ob Tai Str Org Bc	7: 171	I/20: 215	text by Lehms; → BWV 1059	00046
36.4	1.	c. 1726–1730	Cantata Schwingt freudig euch empor (Advent I; early version)	D maj.	stbSATB Oba Str Bc	7: 395	I/1: 17	after BWV 36.1, Z 8359 (/5); text by Picander?, by Nicolai (/5); → BWV 36.5	00048
36.4/5	1.	c. 1726–1730	chorale setting "Wie schön leuchtet der Morgenstern" (s. 7)	D maj.	SATB	7: 399	III/2.1: 28	after Z 8359; text by Nicolai	11193
36.5	1.	1731-12-02	Cantata Schwingt freudig euch empor (Advent I)	D maj.	satbSATB 2Oba Str Bc	7: 221	I/1: 41	after BWV 36.4, Z 1174 (/2, /6, /8), Z 8359 (/4); text by Picander?, by Luther (/2, /6, /8), Nicolai (/4)	00047
36.5/4	1.	1731-12-02	chorale setting "Wie schön leuchtet der Morgenstern" (s. 6)	D maj.	SATB	7: 243	III/2.2: 48, 109, 180	after Z 8359; text by Nicolai	11346
36.5/8	1.	1731-12-02	chorale setting "Nun komm, der Heiden Heiland" (s. 8)	B min.	SATB	7: 258	III/2.2: 18	after Z 1174; text by Luther	11329
36.2	1.	1726-11-30 or 1725-11-30	Secular cantata Steigt freudig in die Luft (birthday of Charlotte Friederike Wilhelmine of Anhalt-Köthen; music lost)		stbSATB Oba Va Str Bc (?)		I/35	text by Picander; after BWV 36.1/1, /3, /5, /7, /9	00049
36.3	1.	1735-07-27	Secular cantata Die Freude reget sich (birthday of Rivinius, J. F.?)	D maj.	satSATB Fl Oba Str Bc	34: 39	I/38: 255	after BWV 36.1/1, /3, /5, /7, /8	00050
36.1	1.	April–May 1725	Secular cantata Schwingt freudig euch empor (birthday of Mencke, J. B.?)	D maj.	stbSATB Oba Str Va Bc	34: 39	I/39: 1	→ BWV 36.2–.4	00051
37	1.	1724-05-18	Cantata Wer da gläubet und getauft wird (Ascension)	A maj.	satbSATB 2Oba Str Bc	7: 259	I/12: 79	after Z 8359 (/3), 5354 (/6); text after Mk 16: 16, by Nicolai (/3), Kolross (/6)	00052
37/6	1.	1724-05-18	chorale setting "Ich dank dir, lieber Herre" (s. 4)	A maj.	SATB	7: 282	III/2.2: 197	after Z 5354; text by Kolross	11304
38	1.	1724-10-29	Cantata Aus tiefer Not schrei ich zu dir (Trinity XXI)	E min.	satbSATB 2Ob 4Tbn Str Bc	7: 283	I/25: 217	after Z 4437; text after Luther	00053
38/6	1.	1724-10-29	chorale setting "Aus tiefer Not schrei ich zu dir" (s. 5)	E min.	SATB	7: 300	III/2.1: 67; III/2.2: 8	after Z 4437; text by Luther	11233
39	1.	1726-06-23	Cantata Brich dem Hungrigen dein Brot (Trinity I)	G min.	sabSATB 2Fl 2Ob Str Bc	7: 336	I/15 179	after Z 6543 (/7); text: Meiningen, after Is 58:7–8 (/1), Hb 13:16 (/4), by Denicke (/7)	00054
39/7	1.	1726-06-23	chorale setting "Kommt, lasst euch den Herren lehren" (s. 6)	B♭ maj.	SATB	7: 348	III/2.1: 81; III/2.2: 37	after Z 6543; text by Denicke	11247
39/7	1.	1726-06-23	chorale setting "Freu dich sehr, o meine Seele"	B♭ maj.	SATB	7: 348	III/2.1: 81; III/2.2: 37	after Z 6543	11247
40	1.	1723-12-26	Cantata Darzu ist erschienen der Sohn Gottes (Christmas 2)	F maj.	atbSATB 2Hn 2Ob Str Bc	7: 349	I/3.1: 3	after Z 2072 (/3), 4870 (/6), 7880a (/8); text after 1Jh 3:8 (/1; → BWV 233/6), by Füger (/3), Gerhardt (/6), Keymann (/8)	00055
40/3	1.	1723-12-26	chorale setting "Wir Christenleut" (s. 3)	G min.	SATB	7: 377	III/2.2: 186	after Z 2072; text by Füger	11315
40/6	1.	1723-12-26	chorale setting "Schwing dich auf zu deinem Gott" (s. 2)	D min.	SATB	7: 387	III/2.2: 82	after Z 4870; text by Gerhardt	11343
40/8	1.	1723-12-26	chorale setting "Freuet euch, ihr Christen alle" (s. 4)	F min.	SATB	7: 394	III/2.2: 6	after Z 7880a; text by Keymann	11339
41	1.	1725-01-01	Cantata Jesu, nun sei gepreiset (New Year)	C maj.	satbSATB 3Tr Tmp 3Ob Str Vc Bc	10: 1	I/4: 37	after Z 8477a; text after Hermann; /6 → BWV 171/6	00056
41/6	1.	1725-01-01	chorale setting "Jesu, nun sei gepreiset" (s. 3)	C maj.	SATB	10: 58	III/2.1: 90; III/2.2: 8	after Z 8477a; text by Hermann	11253
42	1.	1725-04-08	Cantata Am Abend aber desselbigen Sabbats (Quasimodogeniti)	D maj.	satbSATB 2Ob Bas Str Bc	10: 63	I/11.1: 61	after Z 1945b (/7); text after Jh 20:19 (/2), by Fabricius (/4), Luther after Da pacem Domine & Walter after 1Tm 2:2 (/7)	00057
42/7	1.	1725-04-08	chorale setting "Verleih uns Frieden gnädiglich" (ss. 1–2)	F♯ min.	SATB	10: 91	III/2.1: 21; III/2.2: 51, 154	after Z 1945b; text by Luther after Da pacem Domine & Walter after 1Tm 2:2	11186
43	1.	1726-05-30	Cantata Gott fähret auf mit Jauchzen (Ascension)	C maj.	satbSATB 3Tr Tmp 2Ob Str Bc	10: 93	I/12: 133	after Z 5741b (/11: by Peter); text: Meiningen, after Ps 47:6–7 (/1), Mk 16:19 (/4), by Rist (/11)	00058
44	1.	1724-05-21	Cantata Sie werden euch in den Bann tun (Exaudi)	G min.	satbSATB 2Ob Str Bc	10: 127	I/12: 165	after Z 533a (/4), 2293b (/7); text after Jh 16:2 (/1–2), by Moller (/4), Fleming (/7)	00059
44/7	1.	1724-05-21	chorale setting "In allen meinen Taten" (s. 7)	B♭ maj.	SATB	10: 150	III/2.1: 75; III/2.2: 203	after Z 2293b; text by Fleming	11242
44/7	1.	1724-05-21	chorale setting "Nun ruhen alle Wälder"	B♭ maj.	SATB	10: 150	III/2.1: 75; III/2.2: 203	after Z 2293b; text by Gerhardt	11242
45	1.	1726-08-11	Cantata Es ist dir gesagt, Mensch, was gut ist (Trinity VIII)	E maj.	atbSATB 2Fl Ob Oba Str Bc	10: 151	I/18: 197	after Z 5206b–c (/7); text: Meiningen, after Mh 6:8 (/1), Mt 7:22–23 (/4), by Heermann (/7)	00060
45/7	1.	1726-08-11	chorale setting "O Gott, du frommer Gott" (s. 7)	E maj.	SATB	10: 186	III/2.2: 47	after Z 5206b–c; text by Heermann	11297
46	1.	1723-08-01	Cantata Schauet doch und sehet, ob irgend ein Schmerz sei (Trinity X)	D min.	atbSATB Tdt Hn 2Fl 2Odc Str Bc	10: 187	I/19: 109	after Z 5105a (/6); text after Lm 1:12 (/1), by Meyfart (/6)	00061
46/6	1.	1723-08-01	chorale setting "O großer Gott von Macht" (s. 9)	G min.	SATB	10: 236	III/2.2: 45	after Z 5105a; text by Meyfart	11341
47	1.	1726-10-13	Cantata Wer sich selbst erhöhet, der soll erniedriget werden (Trinity XVII)	G min.	sbSATB 2Ob Str Org Bc	10: 239	I/23: 319	after Z 1689a (/5); text by Helbig, after Lk 14:11 (/1)	00062
47/5	1.	1726-10-13	chorale setting "Warum betrübst du dich, mein Herz" (s. 11)	G min.	SATB	10: 274	III/2.2: 52	after Z 1689a	11336
48	1.	1723-10-03	Cantata Ich elender Mensch, wer wird mich erlösen (Trinity XIX)	G min.	atSATB Tr 2Ob Str Bc	10: 275	I/24: 105	after Z 2051 (/3), 4486 (/7); text after Rm 7:24, by Rutilius (/3)	00063
48/3	1.	1723-10-03	chorale setting "Ach Gott und Herr" (s. 4)	B♭ maj.	SATB	10: 288	III/2.1: 30; III/2.2: 166	after Z 2051; text by Rutilius	11197
48/7	1.	1723-10-03	chorale setting "Herr Jesu Christ, ich schrei zu dir" (s. 12)	G min.	SATB	10: 298	III/2.1: 33; III/2.2: 158	after Z 4486	11320
48/7	1.	1723-10-03	chorale setting "Herr Jesu Christ, du höchstes Gut"	G min.	SATB	10: 298	III/2.1: 33; III/2.2: 158	after Z 4486; text by Ringwaldt	11320
49	1.	1726-11-03	Cantata Ich geh und suche mit Verlangen (Trinity XX)	G min.	sb Oba Str Vl Org Bc	10: 299	I/25: 107	after Z 8359; text by Birkmann, Nicolai & after Jer 31:3, Rv 3:20 (/6); /1 → BWV 1053/3	00064
50	1.		Cantata Nun ist das Heil und die Kraft (single movement; arrangement or fragment of a cantata for Michaelmas?)	D maj.	2SATB 3Tr Tmp 3Ob Str Bc	10: 341	I/30: 141	text after Rv 12:10; in SBB P 136	00065
51	1.	1730-09-17	Cantata Jauchzet Gott in allen Landen (Trinity XV)	C maj.	s (2)Tr (Tmp) Str Bc	12^{2}: 1	I/22: 77	after Z 8244 (/4); text after Ps 128:2 & 26:2 (/2), by Gramann (/4)	00066
52	1.	1726-11-24	Cantata Falsche Welt, dir trau ich nicht (Trinity XXIII)	F maj.	sSATB 2Hn 3Ob Bas Str Bc	12^{2}: 25	I/26: 131	after BWV 1046a/1 (/1), Z 2461 (/6); text by Birkmann, Reusner (/6)	00067
54	1.	1714–1717?	Cantata Widerstehe doch der Sünde (Oculi)	E♭ maj.	a 2Vl 2Va Bc	12^{2}: 59	I/18: 3	text by Lehms; → BWV 247/53?	00069
55	1.	1726-11-17	Cantata Ich armer Mensch, ich Sündenknecht (Trinity XXII)	G min.	tSATB Fl Oba Str Bc	12^{2}: 73	I/26: 55	after Z 6551 (/5); text by Birkmann, Rist (/5)	00070
55/5	1.	1726-11-17	chorale setting "Werde munter, mein Gemüte" (s. 6)	B♭ maj.	SATB	12^{2}: 86	III/2.2: 53	after Z 6551; text by Rist	11319
56	1.	1726-10-27	Cantata Ich will den Kreuzstab gerne tragen (Trinity XIX)	G min.	bSATB 2Ob Tai Str Vc Bc	12^{2}: 87	I/24: 173	after Z 6773 (/5); text by Birkmann, Franck, J. (/5)	00071
56/5	1.	1726-10-27	chorale setting "Du, o schönes Weltgebäude" (s. 6)	C Dor.	SATB	12^{2}: 104	III/2.2: 48	after Z 6773; text by Franck, J.	11300
57	1.	1725-12-26	Cantata Selig ist der Mann (Christmas 2)	G min.	sbSATB 2Ob Tai Str Bc	12^{2}: 105	I/3.1: 83	after Z 1912a–c (/8); text by Lehms, Fritsch (/8), after Jm 1:12 (/1)	00072
57/8	1.	1725-12-26	chorale setting "Hast du denn, Jesu, dein Angesicht gänzlich verborgen" (s. 6)	B♭ maj.	SATB	12^{2}: 132	III/2.2: 50	after Z 1912a–c; text by Fritsch	11323
58.2	1.	1733-01-04 or 1734-01-03	Cantata Ach Gott, wie manches Herzeleid (New Year I)	C maj.	sb 2Ob Tai Vl Str Bc	12^{2}: 133	I/4: 217	after BWV 58.1; text by Birkmann, Moller (/1), Behm (/5)	00073
58.1	1.	1727-01-05	Cantata Ach Gott, wie manches Herzeleid (New Year I; early version)	C maj.	sb Vl Str Bc		I/4: 241	after Z 533a (/1, /5); text by Birkmann, Moller (/1), Behm (/5); → BWV 58.2	00074
59	1.	1724-05-28	Cantata Wer mich liebet, der wird mein Wort halten (Pentecost)	C maj.	sbSATB 2Tr Tmp Str Bc	12^{2}: 151	I/13: 65	after Z 7445a (/3); text by Neumeister, Luther (/3), after Jh 14:23 (/1); → BWV 74/1–/2, 175/7	00075
60	1.	1723-11-07	Cantata O Ewigkeit, du Donnerwort (Trinity XXIV)	D maj.	atbSATB Hn 2Oba Str Bc	12^{2}: 169	I/27: 1	after Z 5820 (/1), 7173 (/5); text by Rist (/1), Burmeister (/5), after Rv 14:13 (/4)	00076
60/5	1.	1723-11-07	chorale setting "Es ist genug, so nimm" (s. 5)	A maj.	SATB	12^{2}: 190	III/2.1: 37; III/2.2: 127	after Z 7173; text by Burmeister	11203
61	1.	1714-12-02	Cantata Nun komm, der Heiden Heiland (Advent I – first setting)	A min.	stbSATB Fag 2Vl 2Va Bc	16: 1	I/1: 1	after Z 1174 (/1), 8359 (/6); text by Neumeister, Luther (/1), Nicolai (/6), after Rv 3:20 (/4)	00077
62	1.	1724-12-03	Cantata Nun komm, der Heiden Heiland (Advent I – second setting)	B min.	satbSATB Hn 2Ob Str Bc	16: 19	I/1: 75	after Z 1174; text after Luther	00078
62/6	1.	1724-12-03	chorale setting "Nun komm, der Heiden Heiland" (s. 8)	B min.	SATB	16: 50	III/2.1: 68	after Z 1174; text by Luther	11234
62/6	1.	1724-12-03	chorale setting "Nun komm, der Heiden Heiland" (s. 8)	A min.	SATB		III/2.2: 97	after Z 1174; text by Luther	11234
63	1.	1714-12-25; 1723-12-25	Cantata Christen, ätzet diesen Tag (Christmas; two versions)	C maj.	satbSATB 4Tr Tmp 3Ob Bas Str Bc	16: 51	I/2: 1	text by Heineccius?	00079
64	1.	1723-12-27	Cantata Sehet, welch eine Liebe hat uns der Vater erzeiget (Christmas 3)	E min.	sabSATB Cnt 3Tbn Oba Str Bc	16: 111, 371	I/3.1: 113	after Z 1947 (/2), 5206b–c (/4), 8032 (/8); text after Knauer, 1Jh 3:1 (/1), by Luther (/2), Kindermann (/4), Franck, J. (/8)	00080
64/2	1.	1723-12-27	chorale setting "Gelobet seist du, Jesu Christ" (s. 7)	G maj.	SATB	16: 371	III/2.1: 16; III/2.2: 92	after Z 1947; text by Luther	11179
64/4	1.	1723-12-27	chorale setting "Was frag ich nach der Welt" (s. 1)	D maj.	SATB	16: 372	III/2.1: 16; III/2.2: 151	after Z 5206b–c; text by Kindermann	11180
64/8	1.	1723-12-27	chorale setting "Jesu, meine Freude" (s. 5)	E min.	SATB	16: 132	III/2.1: 15; III/2.2: 80	after Z 8032; text by Franck, J.	11178
65	1.	1724-01-06	Cantata Sie werden aus Saba alle kommen (Epiphany)	C maj.	tbSATB 2Hn 2Fl 2Odc Str Bc	16: 133	I/5: 1	after Z 192b (/2), 7568 (/7); text after Is 60:6 (/1), by Spangenberg (/2), Gerhardt (/7)	00081
65/2	1.	1724-01-06	chorale setting "Ein Kind geboren zu Bethlehem" (s. 4)	A min.	SATB	16: 152	III/2.2: 9	after Z 192b; text by Spangenberg	11342
65/2	1.	1724-01-06	chorale setting "Puer natus in Bethlehem"	A min.	SATB	16: 152	III/2.2: 9	after Z 192b	11342
65/7	1.	1724-01-06	chorale setting "Ich hab in Gottes Herz und Sinn" (s. 10)	A min.	SATB	16: 166	III/2.2: 24	after Z 7568; text by Gerhardt	11337
65/7	1.	1724-01-06	chorale setting "Was mein Gott will, das gscheh allzeit"	A min.	SATB	16: 166	III/2.2: 24	after Z 7568; text by Albert of Prussia	11337
66.2	1.	1724-04-10	Cantata Erfreut euch, ihr Herzen (Easter 2)	D maj.	atbSATB Tr 2Ob Str Bc	16: 167	I/10: 1	after BWV 66.1/8, /1–/4, Z 8584/3	00082
66.2/6	1.	1724-04-10	chorale setting "Alleluja", s. 3 from "Christ ist erstanden"	F♯ min.	SATB	16: 214	III/2.1: 57	after Z 8584/3	11222
66.1	1.	1718-12-10	Secular cantata Der Himmel dacht auf Anhalts Ruhm und Glück (birthday of Leopold of Anhalt-Köthen)		atbSATB 2Ob Bas Str Bc (?)		I/35	text by Hunold; → BWV 66.2/1–/5	00083
67	1.	1724-04-16	Cantata Halt im Gedächtnis Jesum Christ (Quasimodogeniti)	A maj.	atbSATB Hn Fl 2Oba Str Bc	16: 215	I/11.1: 1	after Z 1743 (/4), 4373 (/7); text after 2Ti 2:8 (/1), Jh 20:19 (/6; → BWV 234/2), by Herman (/4), Ebert (/7)	00084
67/7	1.	1724-04-16	chorale setting "Du Friedefürst, Herr Jesu Christ" (s. 1)	A maj.	SATB	16: 246	III/2.1: 10; III/2.2: 25	after Z 4373; text by Ebert	11174
68	1.	1725-05-21	Cantata Also hat Gott die Welt geliebt (Pentecost 2)	D min.	sbSATB Hn Cnt 3Tbn 2Ob Tai Str Vc Bc	16: 247	I/14: 31	after Z 5920 (/1), BWV 208/13 (/2) and /7 (/4); text by Ziegler, C. M., Liscow (/1), after Jh 3:18 (/5)	00085
69.2	1.	1748-08-26	Cantata Lobe den Herrn, meine Seele (council election)	D maj.	satbSATB 3Tr Tmp 3Ob Oba Bas Str Bc	16: 281	I/32.2: 111	after BWV 69.1/1, /3, /5, Z 7247 (/6); text after Knauer, Ps 103:2 (/1), by Luther (/6)	00086
69.2/6	1.	1748-08-26	chorale setting "Es woll uns Gott genädig sein" (s. 3)	D maj.	SATB	16: 325	III/2.2: 192	after Z 7247; text by Luther	11303
69.1	1.	1723-08-15	Cantata Lobe den Herrn, meine Seele (Trinity XII)	D maj.	satbSATB 3Tr Tmp Fl 3Ob Oba Odc Bas Str Bc	16: 373	I/20: 117	after BWV 12/7 (/6); text after Knauer, Ps 103:2 (/1), by Rodigast (/6); → BWV 69.2/1, /3, /5	00087
69.1/6	1.	1723-08-15	chorale setting "Was Gott tut, das ist wohlgetan" (s. 6)	G maj.	SATB	16: 379	III/2.1: 55; III/2.2: 174	after BWV 12/7; text by Rodigast	11219
70.2	1.	1723-11-21	Cantata Wachet! Betet! Betet! Wachet! (Trinity XXVI)	C maj.	satbSATB Tr Ob Str Vc Bc	16: 327	I/27: 107	after BWV 70.1, Z 6543 (/7); text by Franck, S, Keymann (/11)	00088
70.2/11	1.	1716-12-06	chorale setting "Meinen Jesum laß ich nicht, weil" (s. 5)	C maj.	SATB	16: 368	III/2.2: 200	= BWV 70.1/6	11308
70.1	1.	1716-12-06	Cantata Wachet! Betet! Betet! Wachet! (Advent II)	C maj.	satbSATB Tr Ob Str Vc Bc	16: 327	I/1	after Z 3449 (/6); text by Franck, S, Keymann (/6); → BWV 70.2/1, /3, /5, /8, /10, /11	00089
71	1.	1708-02-04	Cantata Gott ist mein König (council election)	D maj.	satbSATB 3Tr Tmp 2Fl Vc 2Ob Bas Str Vne Org	18: 1	I/32.1: 3	after Z 5148 (/2); text by Eilmar?, Heermann & after 2Sm 19:35 & 37 (/2), Ps 74:12 (/1), 16–17 (/4), 19 (/6), Dt 33:25 & Gn 21:22b (/3)	00090
72	1.	1726-01-27	Cantata Alles nur nach Gottes Willen (Epiphany III)	A min.	sabSATB 2Ob Str Bc	18: 55	I/6: 59	after Z 7568 (/6); text by Franck, S, Albert of Prussia (/6); /1 → BWV 235/2	00091
73	1.	1724-01-23	Cantata Herr, wie du willt, so schicks mit mir (Epiphany III)	G min.	stbSATB Hn 2Ob Str Bc	18: 85	I/6: 3	after Z 4441a (/1), 5264b (/5); text by Bienemann (/1), Helmbold (/5)	00092
73/5	1.	1724-01-23	chorale setting "Von Gott will ich nicht lassen" (s. 9)	C min. A min.	SATB	18: 104	III/2.2: 107	after Z 5264b; text by Helmbold	11310
74	1.	1725-05-20	Cantata Wer mich liebet, der wird mein Wort halten (Pentecost)	C maj.	satbSATB 3Tr Tmp 2Ob Odc Str Bc	18: 105	I/13: 83	after BWV 59/1 & /4 (/1–/2), Z 2496 (/8); text by Ziegler, C. M., Gerhardt (/8), after Jh 14:23 (/1), 28 (/4), Rm 8:1 (/6)	00093
74/8	1.	1725-05-20	chorale setting "Gott Vater, sende deinen Geist" (s. 2)	A min.	SATB	18: 146	III/2.1: 78; III/2.2: 212	after Z 2496; text by Gerhardt	11245
74/8	1.	1725-05-20	chorale setting "Kommt her zu mir, spricht Gottes Sohn"	A min.	SATB	18: 146	III/2.1: 78; III/2.2: 212	after Z 2496; text by Grünwald	11245
75	1.	1723-05-30	Cantata Die Elenden sollen essen (Trinity I)	E min.	satbSATB Tr 2Ob Oba Bas Str Bc	18: 147	I/15: 85	after Z 5629 (/7=/14: → BWV 100/6); text after Ps 22:27 (/1), by Rodigast (/7, /14)	00094
76	1.	1723-06-06	Cantata Die Himmel erzählen die Ehre Gottes (Trinity II)	C maj.	satbSATB Tr 2Ob Oba Str Vdg Bc	18: 189	I/16: 1	after Z 7247 (/7=/14); text after Ps 12:2 & 4 (/1), by Luther (/7, /14); /8 ↔ BWV 528/1	00095
77	1.	1723-08-22	Cantata Du sollt Gott, deinen Herren, lieben (Trinity XIII)	C maj.	satbSATB Tdt 2Ob Str Bc	18: 233	I/21: 1	after Z 4431 (/6); text after Knauer, Lk 10:27 (/1), by Denicke? (/6)	00096
77/6	1.	1723-08-22	chorale setting "Wenn einer alle Ding verstünd" (s. 8)?	G min.	SATB	18: 254	III/2.1: 14; III/2.2: 150	after Z 4431; text by Denicke	11176
77/6	1.	1723-08-22	chorale setting "Ach Gott, vom Himmel sieh darein"	G min.	SATB	18: 254	III/2.1: 14; III/2.2: 150	after Z 4431; text by Luther	11176
78	1.	1724-09-10	Cantata Jesu, der du meine Seele (Trinity XIV)	G min.	satbSATB Hn Fl 2Ob Str Vne Bc	18: 255	I/21: 115	after Z 6804; text after Rist	00097
78/7	1.	1724-09-10	chorale setting "Jesu, der du meine Seele" (s. 12)	G min.	SATB	18: 286	III/2.1: 60; III/2.2: 150	after Z 6804; text by Rist	11225
79	1.	1725-10-31	Cantata Gott der Herr ist Sonn und Schild (Reformation Day; two versions: Fl associated with 2nd c.1730)	G maj.	sabSATB 2Hn Tmp (2Fl) 2Ob Str Bc	18: 287	I/31: 1	after Z 5142 (/3), 159 (/6); text after Ps 84:12 (/1), by Rinkart (/3), Helmbold (/6); → BWV 236/2, /4, 234/5	00098
80.3	1.	c. 1735?	Cantata Ein feste Burg ist unser Gott (Reformation Day; 2nd Leipzig v.; Tr & Tmp in BGA likely W. F. Bach's addition)	D maj.	satbSATB 3Ob 2Oba Odc Str Bc	18: 317	I/31: 71	after BWV 80.2 (same text)	00099
80.1	1.	1715-03-24	Cantata Alles, was von Gott geboren (Oculi; music lost)		satb(?)SATB Ob Str Bc		I/8.2: V	after Z 7377 (/1, /6)?; text by Franck, S, Luther (/6); → BWV 80.2	00100
80.2	1.	c. 1729–1731	Cantata Ein feste Burg ist unser Gott (Reformation Day; 1st Leipzig version)	D maj.	sbSATB Ob Str Bc	18: 351	I/31: 65	after Z 7377, BWV 80.1 (/2–/4, /6–/7); text by Franck, S, Luther (/1, /2, /5, /8); → BWV 80.3	00101
80/8	1.	c. 1729–1731	chorale setting "Ein feste Burg ist unser Gott" (s. 4)	D maj.	SATB	18: 378	III/2.1: 29; III/2.2: 162	after Z 7377; text by Luther	11195
81	1.	1724-01-30	Cantata Jesus schläft, was soll ich hoffen? (Epiphany IV)	E min.	atbSATB 2Fl 2Oba Str Bc	20^{1}: 1	I/6: 111	after Z 8032 (/7); text after Ps 10:1 (/2), Mt 8:26 (/4), by Franck, J. (/7)	00102
81/7	1.	1724-01-30	chorale setting "Jesu, meine Freude" (s. 2)	E min.	SATB	20^{1}: 24	III/2.2: 188	after Z 8032; text by Franck, J.	11305
82.1	1.	1727-02-02	Cantata Ich habe genug (Purification; 1st version)	C min.	b Ob Str Bc	20^{1}: 25	I/28.1: 77	text by Birkmann; → BWV 82.2–.4	00103
82.2	1.	1731-02-02	Cantata Ich habe genug (Purification; 2nd version)	E min.	s Fl Str Bc		I/28.1: 155	after BWV 82.1 (same text); → 82.3–.4	00104
82.2/2–/3	1.	c.1731 (AMB)	Notebook A. M. Bach (1725) No. 34 Recitative "Ich habe genug"; Aria "Schlummert ein, ihr matten Augen"	E min.	s Bc	43^{2}: 46	V/4:122	after BWV 82.2; text by Birkmann	00104
82.2/3	1.	c.1731 (AMB)	Notebook A. M. Bach (1725) No. 38 Aria "Schlummert ein, ihr matten Augen" (incomplete)	E min.	s Bc	43^{2}: 49	V/4:122	after BWV 82.2; text by Birkmann	00104
82.3	1.	c.1735	Cantata Ich habe genug (Purification; 3rd version)	C min.	b or mezzo Ob Str Bc		I/28.1: 109	after BWV 82.1–.2 (same text); → 82.4	00105
82.4	1.	1746–1748	Cantata Ich habe genug (Purification; 4th version)	C min.	b (or mezzo) Ob Odc Str Bc		I/28.1: 109	after BWV 82.1–.3 (same text)	00106
83	1.	1724-02-02	Cantata Erfreute Zeit im neuen Bunde (Purification)	F maj.	atbSATB 2Hn 2Ob Vl Str Bc	20^{1}: 51	I/28.1: 3	after Z 3986 (/5); text after Lk 2:29–31 (/2), Hb 4:16 (/3), by Luther (/5)	00107
83/5	1.	1724-02-02	chorale setting "Mit Fried und Freud ich fahr dahin" (s. 4)	D min.	SATB	20^{1}: 76	III/2.2: 188	after Z 3986; text by Luther	11309
84	1.	1727-02-09	Cantata Ich bin vergnügt mit meinem Glücke (Septuagesimae)	E min.	sSATB Ob Str Bc	20^{1}: 77	I/7: 21	after Z 2778 (/5); text after Picander, by E. J. of Schwarzburg-Rudolstadt (/5)	00108
84/5	1.	1727-02-09	chorale setting "Wer weiß, wie nahe mir mein Ende" (s. 12)	B min.	SATB	20^{1}: 98	III/2.1: 27; III/2.2: 63	after Z 2778; text by E. J. of Schwarzburg-Rudolstadt	11192
84/5	1.	1727-02-09	chorale setting "Wer nur den lieben Gott lässt walten"	B min.	SATB	20^{1}: 98	III/2.1: 27; III/2.2: 63	after Z 2778; text by Neumark	11192
85	1.	1725-04-15	Cantata Ich bin ein guter Hirt (Misericordias Domini)	C min.	satbSATB 2Ob Str Vc Bc	20^{1}: 99	I/11.1: 157	after Z 4457 (/3), 2542 (/6); text after Jh 10:12 (/1), by Becker (/3), Homburg (/6)	00109
85/6	1.	1725-04-15	chorale setting "Ist Gott mein Schild und Helfersmann" (s. 4)	C min.	SATB	20^{1}: 118	III/2.1: 74; III/2.2: 69	after Z 2542; text by Homburg	11240
86	1.	1724-05-14	Cantata Wahrlich, wahrlich, ich sage euch (Rogate)	E maj.	satbSATB 2Oba Str Bc	20^{1}: 119	I/12: 45	after Z 2496c (/3), 4430 (/6); text after Jh 16:23 (/1), by Grünwald (/3), Speratus (/6)	00110
86/6	1.	1724-05-14	chorale setting "Es ist das Heil uns kommen her" (s. 11)	E maj.	SATB	20^{1}: 134	III/2.2: 3	after Z 4430; text by Speratus	11322
87	1.	1725-05-06	Cantata Bisher habt ihr nichts gebeten in meinem Namen (Rogate)	D min.	atbSATB 2Ob 2Odc Str Bc	20^{1}: 135	I/12: 61	after Z 8032 (/7); text after Ziegler, C. M., Jh 16:24 (/1), by Müller, H. (/7)	00111
87/7	1.	1725-05-06	chorale setting "Selig ist die Seele" (s. 9)	D min.	SATB	20^{1}: 152	III/2.1: 73; III/2.2: 54	after Z 8032; text by Müller, H.	11239
87/7	1.	1725-05-06	chorale setting "Jesu, meine Freude"	D min.	SATB	20^{1}: 152	III/2.1: 73; III/2.2: 54	after Z 8032; text by Franck, J.	11239
88	1.	1726-07-21	Cantata Siehe, ich will viel Fischer aussenden (Trinity V)	D maj.	satbSATB 2Hn 2Oba Tai Str Bc	20^{1}: 153	I/17.2: 33	after Z 2778 (/7); text: Meiningen, after Jer 16:16 (/1), Lk 5:10 (/4), by Neumark (/7)	00112
88/7	1.	1726-07-21	chorale setting "Wer nur den lieben Gott lässt walten" (s. 7)	B min.	SATB	20^{1}: 178	III/2.2: 58	after Z 2778; text by Neumark	11312
89	1.	1723-10-24	Cantata Was soll ich aus dir machen, Ephraim? (Trinity XXII)	C min.	sabSATB Hn 2Ob Str Bc	20^{1}: 179	I/26: 1	after Z 2164 (/6); text after Hs 11:8 (/1), by Heermann (/6)	00113
89/6	1.	1723-10-24	chorale setting "Wo soll ich fliehen hin" (s. 7)	G min.	SATB	20^{1}: 194	III/2.2: 167	after Z 2164; text by Heermann	11292
90	1.	1723-11-14	Cantata Es reißet euch ein schrecklich Ende (Trinity XXV)	D min.	atbSATB (Tr) Str Bc	20^{1}: 195	I/27: 59	after Z 2561 (/5); text by Moller (/5)	00114
90/5	1.	1723-11-14	chorale setting "Nimm von uns, Herr, du treuer Gott" (s. 7)	D min.	SATB	20^{1}: 214	III/2.1: 33; III/2.2: 158	after Z 2561; text by Moller	11199
90/5	1.	1723-11-14	chorale setting "Vater unser im Himmelreich"	D min.	SATB	20^{1}: 214	III/2.1: 33; III/2.2: 158	after Z 2561; text by Luther	11199
91.2	1.	1746–1747	Cantata Gelobet seist du, Jesu Christ (Christmas; later version)	G maj.	satbSATB 2Hn Tmp 3Ob Str Bc	22: 1	I/2: 131	after BWV 91.1 (same text)	00115
91.1	1.	1724-12-25	Cantata Gelobet seist du, Jesu Christ (Christmas; early version)	G maj.	satbSATB 2Hn Tmp 3Ob Str Bc	22: 1, 333	I/2: 164	after Z 1947; text after Luther; → BWV 91.2	00116
91/6	1.	1724-12-25	chorale setting "Gelobet seist du, Jesu Christ" (s. 7)	G maj.	SATB		III/2.1: 89; III/2.2: 30	after Z 1947; text by Luther	11252
92	1.	1725-01-28	Cantata Ich hab in Gottes Herz und Sinn (Septuagesimae)	B min.	satbSATB 2Oba Str Bc	22: 33	I/7: 41	after Z 7568; text after Gerhardt	00117
93	1.	1724-07-09	Cantata Wer nur den lieben Gott läßt walten (Trinity V)	C min.	satbSATB 2Ob Str Bc	22: 69	I/17.2: 3	after Z 2778; text after Neumark; /4 → BWV 647	00118
94	1.	1724-08-06	Cantata Was frag ich nach der Welt (Trinity IX)	D maj.	satbSATB Fl 2Ob 2Oba Str Bc	22: 95	I/19: 43	after Z 5206b–c; text after Kindermann	00119
94/8	1.	1724-08-06	chorale setting "Was frag ich nach der Welt" (s. 8)	D maj.	SATB	22: 127	III/2.1: 53; III/2.2: 173	after Z 5206b–c; text by Kindermann	11215
95	1.	1723-09-12	Cantata Christus, der ist mein Leben (Trinity XVI)	G maj.	stbSATB Hn or Cnt 2Ob 2Oba Str Bc	22: 129	I/23: 65	after Z 132 & 3986 (/1: → BWV 282), 5404a (/3), 4482 (/7); text by Simon Graf & Luther (/1), Herberger (/3), Herman (/7)	00120
95/7	1.	1723-09-12	chorale setting "Wenn mein Stündlein vorhanden ist" (s. 4)	G maj.	SATB	22: 153	III/2.1: 64	after Z 4482; text by Herman	11229
96	1.	1724-10-08	Cantata Herr Christ, der einge Gottessohn (Trinity XVIII)	F maj.	satbSATB Hn or Tbn Fl/Fl or Vl 2Ob Str Bc	22: 155	I/24: 1	after Z 4297a; text after Cruciger	00121
96/6	1.	1724-10-08	chorale setting "Herr Christ, der einge Gottessohn" (s. 5)	F maj.	SATB	22: 184	III/2.1: 66; III/2.2: 179	after Z 4297a; text by Cruciger	11231
97	1.	1734-07-25? after 1735	Cantata In allen meinen Taten (two versions; Trinity V?)	B♭ maj.	satbSATB 2Ob Str Bc	22: 185, 336	I/34: 197	after Z 2293b; text by Fleming; /9 → BWV 392	00122
97/9	1.	1734-07-25? after 1735	chorale setting "In allen meinen Taten" (s. 9)	B♭ maj.	SATB	22: 230	III/2.1: 49	after Z 2293b; text by Fleming; → BWV 392	11210
97/9	1.	1734-07-25? after 1735	chorale setting "Nun ruhen alle Wälder"	B♭ maj.	SATB	22: 230	III/2.1: 49	after Z 2293b; text by Gerhardt; → BWV 392	11210
98	1.	1726-11-10	Cantata Was Gott tut, das ist wohlgetan (Trinity XXI)	B♭ maj.	satbSATB 2Ob Str Bc	22: 231	I/25: 241	after Z 5629 (/1); text by Birkmann, Rodigast (/1)	00123
99	1.	1724-09-17	Cantata Was Gott tut, das ist wohlgetan (Trinity XV)	G maj.	satbSATB Hn Fl Oba Str Bc	22: 251	I/22: 41	after Z 5629; text after Rodigast; /1 → BWV 100/1	00124
100	1.	1734–1735	Cantata Was Gott tut, das ist wohlgetan	G maj.	satbSATB 2Hn Tmp Fl Oba Str Bc	22: 277	I/34: 239	after Z 5629, BWV 99/1 (/1), 75/7 (/6); text by Rodigast	00125
100/6	1.	1734–1735	chorale setting "Was Gott tut, das ist wohlgetan" (s. 6)	G maj.	SATB	22: 323	III/2.1: 72	after 75/7=/14; text by Rodigast	11238
101	1.	1724-08-13	Cantata Nimm von uns, Herr, du treuer Gott (Trinity X)	D min.	satbSATB 2Hn Tmp Fl Oba Str Bc	23: 1	I/19: 173	after Z 2561; text after Moller	00126
101/7	1.	1724-08-13	chorale setting "Nimm von uns, Herr, du treuer Gott" (s. 7)	D min.	SATB	23: 32	III/2.1: 54; III/2.2: 174	after Z 2561; text by Moller	11216
102	1.	1726-08-25	Cantata Herr, deine Augen sehen nach dem Glauben (Trinity X)	G min.	atbSATB Fl Vl 2Ob Str Bc	23: 33	I/19: 229	after Z 2561 (/7); text: Meiningen, after Jer 5:3 (/1: → BWV 235/1), Rm 2:4–5 (/4), by Heermann (/7); /3 & /5 → BWV 233/4 & /5	00127
102/7	1.	1726-08-25	chorale setting "So wahr ich lebe, spricht dein Gott" (ss. 6–7)	C min.	SATB	23: 66	III/2.2: 62	after Z 2561; text by Heermann	11334
102/7	1.	1726-08-25	chorale setting "Vater unser im Himmelreich"	C min.	SATB	23: 66	III/2.2: 62	after Z 2561; text by Luther	11334
103	1.	1725-04-22; 1731-04-15	Cantata Ihr werdet weinen und heulen (Jubilate, 2 versions)	B min.	atSATB Tr Fl Fl (or) Vl 2Oba Str Bc	23: 67	I/11.2: 25	after Z 7568 (/6); text by Ziegler, C. M., Gerhardt (/6)	00128
103/6	1.	1725-04-22; 1731-04-15	chorale setting "Barmherzger Vater, höchster Gott" (s. 9)	B min.	SATB	23: 94	III/2.1: 72; III/2.2: 68	after Z 7568; text by Gerhardt	11237
103/6	1.	1725-04-22; 1731-04-15	chorale setting "Ich hab in Gottes Herz und Sinn"	B min.	SATB	23: 94	III/2.1: 72; III/2.2: 68	after Z 7568; text by Gerhardt	11237
103/6	1.	1725-04-22; 1731-04-15	chorale setting "Was mein Gott will, das gscheh allzeit"	B min.	SATB	23: 94	III/2.1: 72; III/2.2: 68	after Z 7568; text by Albert of Prussia	11237
104	1.	1724-04-23	Cantata Du Hirte Israel, höre (Misericordias)	G maj.	tbSATB 2Ob 2Oba Tai Str Bc	23: 95	I/11.1: 113	after Z 4457 (/6); text after Ps 80:2 (/1), by Becker (/6)	00129
104/6	1.	1724-04-23	chorale setting "Der Herr ist mein getreuer Hirt" (s. 1)	A maj.	SATB	23: 116	III/2.2: 189	after Z 4457; text by Becker	11283
104/6	1.	1724-04-23	chorale setting "Allein Gott in der Höh sei Ehr"	A maj.	SATB	23: 116	III/2.2: 189	after Z 4457; text by Decius	11283
104/6	1.	1724-04-23	chorale setting "Allein Gott in der Höh sei Ehr"	G maj.	SATB		III/2.2: 71	after Z 4457; text by Decius	11290
105	1.	1723-07-25	Cantata Herr, gehe nicht ins Gericht mit deinem Knecht (Trinity IX)	G min.	satbSATB Hn 2Ob Str Bc	23: 117	I/19: 1	after Z 6804 (/6); text after Ps 143:2 (/1), by Rist (/6)	00130
105/6	1.	1723-07-25	chorale setting "Jesu, der du meine Seele" (s. 11)	G min.	SATB	23: 146	III/2.1: 52	after Z 6804; text by Rist	11214
106	1.	1708-09-16?	Cantata Gottes Zeit ist die allerbeste Zeit (funeral; aka Actus tragicus)	E♭ maj.	satbSATB 2Fl 2Vdg Bc	23: 147	I/34: 1	after Z 1680 (/2d), 3986 (/3b), 2461 (/4); text after Olearius, J., Acts 17:28 & Ps 90:12 & Is 38:1 & JS 14:18 & Rv 22:20 (/2), Ps 31:6 & Lk 23:43 & by Luther (/3), Reusner (/4)	00131
107	1.	1724-07-23	Cantata Was willst du dich betrüben (Trinity VII)	B min.	stbSATB Hn 2Fl 2Oba Str Bc	23: 179	I/18: 55	after Z 5264b; text by Heermann	00132
108	1.	1725-04-29	Cantata Es ist euch gut, daß ich hingehe (Cantate)	A maj.	atbSATB 2Oba Str Bc	23: 203	I/12: 17	after Z 2496 (/6); text by Ziegler, C. M., Gerhardt (/6), after Jh 16:7 (/1), 13 (/4)	00133
108/6	1.	1725-04-29	chorale setting "Gott Vater, sende deinen Geist" (s. 10)	B min.	SATB	23: 230	III/2.1: 69; III/2.2: 26	after Z 2496; text by Gerhardt	11235
108/6	1.	1725-04-29	chorale setting "Kommt her zu mir, spricht Gottes Sohn"	B min.	SATB	23: 230	III/2.1: 69; III/2.2: 26	after Z 2496; text by Grünwald	11235
109	1.	1723-10-17	Cantata Ich glaube, lieber Herr, hilf meinem Unglauben (Trinity XXI; 2 versions)	D min.	atSATB (Hn) 2Ob Str Bc	23: 231	I/25: 157	after Z 7549 (/6); text after Mk 9:24 (/1), by Spengler (/6)	00134
110	1.	1725-12-25	Cantata Unser Mund sei voll Lachens (Christmas)	D maj.	satbSATB 3Tr Tmp 2Fl 3Ob Oba Odc Bas Str Bc	23: 263	I/2: 71	after Z 2072 (/7); text by Lehms, Füger (/7), after Ps 126:2–3 (/1), Jer 10:6 (/3), Lk 2:14 (/5)	00135
110/7	1.	1725-12-25	chorale setting "Wir Christenleut" (s. 5)	B min.	SATB	23: 324	III/2.2: 32	after Z 2072; text by Füger	11316
111	1.	1725-01-21	Cantata Was mein Gott will, das g'scheh allzeit (Epiphany III)	A min.	satbSATB 2Ob Str Bc	24: 1	I/6: 27	after Z 7568; text after Albert of Prussia	00136
112	1.	1731-04-08	Cantata Der Herr ist mein getreuer Hirt (Misericordias)	G maj.	satbSATB 2Hn 2Oba Str Bc	24: 29	I/11.1: 179	after Z 4457; text by Meuslin after Ps. 23	00137
112/5	1.	1731-04-08	chorale setting "Der Herr ist mein getreuer Hirt" (s. 5)	G maj.	SATB	24: 48	III/2.1: 71; III/2.2: 183, 202	after Z 4457; text by Meuslin after Ps. 23	11236
112/5	1.	1731-04-08	chorale setting "Allein Gott in der Höh sei Ehr"	G maj.	SATB	24: 48	III/2.1: 71; III/2.2: 183, 202	after Z 4457; text by Decius	11236
113	1.	1724-08-20	Cantata Herr Jesu Christ, du höchstes Gut (Trinity XI)	B min.	satbSATB Fl 2Oba Str Bc	24: 49	I/20: 79	after Z 4486; text after Ringwaldt	00138
113/8	1.	1724-08-20	chorale setting "Herr Jesu Christ, du höchstes Gut" (s. 8)	B min.	SATB	24: 80	III/2.1: 54; III/2.2: 175	after Z 4486; text by Ringwaldt	11217
114	1.	1724-10-01	Cantata Ach, lieben Christen, seid getrost (Trinity XVII)	G min.	satbSATB Hn Fl 2Ob Str Bc	24: 81	I/23: 287	after Z 4441a; text after Gigas	00139
114/7	1.	1724-10-01	chorale setting "Ach, lieben Christen, seid getrost" (s. 6)	G min.	SATB	24: 108	III/2.1: 65; III/2.2: 179	after Z 4441a; text by Gigas	11230
115	1.	1724-11-05	Cantata Mache dich, mein Geist, bereit (Trinity XXII)	G maj.	satbSATB Hn Fl Oba Str Vc Bc	24: 109	I/26: 21	after Z 6274a; text after Freystein	00140
115/6	1.	1724-11-05	chorale setting "Mache dich, mein Geist, bereit" (s. 10)	G maj.	SATB	24: 132	III/2.1: 25; III/2.2: 23	after Z 6274a; text by Freystein	11190
115/6	1.	1724-11-05	chorale setting "Straf mich nicht in deinem Zorn"	G maj.	SATB	24: 132	III/2.1: 25; III/2.2: 23	after Z 6274a; text by Albinus	11190
116	1.	1724-11-26	Cantata Du Friedefürst, Herr Jesu Christ (Trinity XXV)	A maj.	satbSATB Hn 2Oba Str Bc	24: 133	I/27: 79	after Z 4373; text after Ebert	00141
117	1.	1728–1731	Cantata Sei Lob und Ehr dem höchsten Gut	G maj.	atbSATB 2Fl 2Ob 2Oba Str Bc	24: 159	I/34: 151	after Z 4430; text by Schütz, J. J.	00142
117/4; 117/9	1.	1728–1731	chorale setting "Sei Lob und Ehr dem höchsten Gut" (ss. 4, 9)	G maj.	SATB	24: 159	III/2.1: 71; III/2.2: 203	after Z 4430; text by Schütz, J. J.	11172
117/4; 117/9	1.	1728–1731	chorale setting "Sei Lob und Ehr dem höchsten Gut"	G maj.	SATB	24: 159	III/2.1: 9 III/2.2: 147	after Z 4430; text by Schütz, J. J.	11173
119	1.	1723-08-30	Cantata Preise, Jerusalem, den Herrn (council election)	C maj.	satbSATB 4Tr Tmp 2Fl 3Ob 2Odc Str Bc	24: 193	I/32.1: 129	after Z 8652 (/9); text after Ps 147:12–14 (/1), by Luther (/9)	00144
120.1	1.	1729 or earlier	Cantata Gott, man lobet dich in der Stille (council election)	A maj.	satbSATB 3Tr 2Ob 2Oba **Vl** Str Bc	24: 247	I/32.2: 53	after Z 8652 (/6); text after Ps 65:2 (/1), by Luther (/6); ↔ BWV 120.2/6 (/1 → .3/1), /1 (/2 → .3/2), /3 (/4 ↔ 1019a/3 → .3/4)	00145
120.2	1.	1729?	Cantata Herr Gott, Beherrscher aller Dinge (wedding; incomplete)	D maj.	satbSATB 3Tr Tmp 2Ob 2Oba Str Org Bc	41: 149	I/33: 75	after BWV 1006/1 (/4 → 29/1), 137/5 (/8); text after JS 50:24 (/2), by Luther (/5), Neander (/8); ↔ BWV 120.1/2 (/1 → .3/2), /4 (/3 ↔ 1019a/3 → .3/4), /1 (/6 → .3/1)	00146
120.3	1.	1730-06-26	Cantata Gott, man lobet dich in der Stille (200th anniversary of the Augsb. Confess.; music lost, partially reconstructable)		saSATB 3Tr Tmp 2Oba Vl Str Bc ?		I/34; I/32.2	after BWV 120.1/1 (=.2/6), /2 (=.2/1 → 232^{II}/9), /4 (=.2/3 ↔ 1019a/3); text by Picander	00147
121	1.	1724-12-26	Cantata Christum wir sollen loben schon (Christmas 2)	E min.	satbSATB Cnt 3Tbn Oba Str Bc	26: 1	I/3.1: 57	after Z 297c, text after Luther	00148
121/6	1.	1724-12-26	chorale setting "Christum wir sollen loben schon" (s. 8)	E min.	SATB	26: 20	III/2.2: 31	after Z 297c, text by Luther	11284
122	1.	1724-12-31	Cantata Das neugeborne Kindelein (Christmas I)	G min.	satbSATB 3Fl 2Ob Tai Str Bc	26: 21	I/3.2: 53	after Z 491; text after Schneegaß	00149
122/6	1.	1724-12-31	chorale setting "Das neugeborne Kindelein" (s. 5)	G min.	SATB	26: 40	III/2.1: 43; III/2.2: 30, 101	after Z 491; text by Schneegaß	11207
123	1.	1725-01-06	Cantata Liebster Immanuel, Herzog der Frommen (Epiphany)	B min.	atbSATB 2Fl 2Oba Str Bc	26: 41	I/5: 47	after Z 4932c; text after Fritsch	00150
123/6	1.	1725-01-06	chorale setting "Liebster Immanuel, Herzog der Frommen" (s. 6)	B min.	SATB	26: 60	III/2.2: 108	after Z 4932c; text by Fritsch	11340
124	1.	1725-01-07	Cantata Meinen Jesum laß ich nicht (Epiphany I)	E maj.	satbSATB Hn Oba Str Bc	26: 61	I/5: 115	after Z 3449; text after Keymann	00151
125	1.	1725-02-02	Cantata Mit Fried und Freud ich fahr dahin (Purification)	E min.	atbSATB Hn Fl Ob Oba Str Bc	26: 83	I/28.1: 31	after Z 3986; text after Luther	00152
126	1.	1725-02-04	Cantata Erhalt uns, Herr, bei deinem Wort (Sexagesimae)	A min.	atbSATB Tr 2Ob Str Bc	26: 111	I/7: 155	after Z 350a, 1945b (/6); text after Luther, Jonas, Walter	00153
126/6	1.	1725-02-04	chorale setting "Verleih uns Frieden gnädiglich" (ss. 1–2)	A min.	SATB	26: 131	III/2.2: 126 (in g)	after Z 1945b; text by Luther, Walter	11335
127	1.	1725-02-11	Cantata Herr Jesu Christ, wahr' Mensch und Gott (Estomihi)	F maj.	stbSATB Tr 2Fl 2Ob Str Bc	26: 133	I/8: 107	after Z 2570; text after Eber; /1 → BWV 127/1 (variant)	00154
127/5	1.	1725-02-11	chorale setting "Herr Jesu Christ, wahr' Mensch und Gott" (s. 8)	F maj.	SATB	26: 160	III/2.1: 46; III/2.2: 169	after Z 2570; text by Eber	11209
127/1 (var.)	1.	c.1750	Chorus "Herr Jesu Christ, wahr' Mensch und Gott" (Passion oratorio movement)	E♭ maj.	SATB 2Fl 2Ob Str Bc		I/41: 95	after BWV 127/1; → BC D 10	00155
128	1.	1725-05-10	Cantata Auf Christi Himmelfahrt allein (Ascension)	G maj.	atbSATB Tr 2Hn 2Ob 2Oba Odc Str Bc	26: 163	I/12: 101	after Z 4457 (/1), 5206b (/5); text by Ziegler, C. M., Sonnemann (/1), Avenarius (/5)	00156
129	1.	1727-06-08	Cantata Gelobet sei der Herr, mein Gott (Trinity)	D maj.	sabSATB 3Tr Tmp Fl 2Ob Oba Str Bc	26: 185	I/15: 37	after Z 5206b; text by Olearius, J.	00157
129/5	1.	1727-06-08	chorale setting "Gelobet sei der Herr, mein Gott" (s. 5)	D maj.	SATB	26: 224	III/2.1: 80	after Z 5206b; text by Olearius, J.	11246
129/5	1.	1727-06-08	chorale setting "O Gott, du frommer Gott"	D maj.	SATB	26: 224	III/2.1: 80	after Z 5206b; text by Heermann	11246
130.1	1.	1724-09-29	Cantata Herr Gott, dich loben alle wir (Michaelmas; 1st version)	C maj.	satbSATB 3Tr Tmp Fl 3Ob Str Bc	26: 231	I/30: 1	after Z 368; text after Eber; → BWV 130.2	00158
130/6	1.	1724-09-29	chorale setting "Herr Gott, dich loben alle wir" (s. 11)	C maj.	SATB	26: 268	III/2.1: 61; III/2.2: 218	after Z 368; text by Eber	11226
130.2	1.	1732–1735	Cantata Herr Gott, dich loben alle wir (Michaelmas; 2nd version)	C maj.	satbSATB 3Tr Tmp Fl 3Ob Str Bc		I/30: 48	after BWV 130.1 (same text)	00159
131	1.	1707	Cantata Aus der Tiefen rufe ich, Herr, zu dir	G min.	satbSATB Ob Bas Str Bc	28: 1	I/34: 67	after Z 4486 (/2, /4); text after Ps. 130, by Ringwaldt (/2, /4); → BWV 131a	00160
132	1.	1715-12-22	Cantata Bereitet die Wege, bereitet die Bahn (Advent IV)	A maj.	satbSATB Ob Bas Str Vc Bc	28: 33	I/1: 99 rev 2: 97	text by Franck, S., Cruciger (/6)	00162
133	1.	1724-12-27	Cantata Ich freue mich in dir (Christmas 3)	A maj.	satbSATB Cnt 2Oba Str Bc	28: 51	I/3.1: 135	↔ Z 5187; text after Ziegler, C.	00163
133/6	1.	1724-12-27	chorale setting "Ich freue mich in dir" (s. 4)	D maj.	SATB	28: 80	III/2.1: 44; III/2.2: 34	↔ Z 5187; text by Ziegler, C.	11208
134.3	1.	1731-03-27; 1735-04-12	Cantata Ein Herz, das seinen Jesum lebend weiß (Easter 3; later version)	B♭ maj.	atSATB 2Ob Str Bc	28: 81	I/10: 69	after BWV 134.2	00164
134.2	1.	1724-04-11	Cantata Ein Herz, das seinen Jesum lebend weiß (Easter 3; early version)	B♭ maj.	atSATB 2Ob Str Bc	28: 81, 287	I/10: 106	after BWV 134.1; → BWV 134.3	00165
134.1	1.	1719-01-01	Secular cantata Die Zeit, die Tag und Jahre macht (congratulation for New Year)	B♭ maj.	atSATB 2Ob Str Bc	29: 209	I/35: 49	text by Hunold; → BWV 134.2	00166
135	1.	1724-06-25	Cantata Ach Herr, mich armen Sünder (Trinity III)	E min.	atbSATB Cnt Tbn 2Ob Str Bc	28: 119	I/16: 197	after Z 5385a; text after Schneegaß	00167
136	1.	1723-07-18	Cantata Erforsche mich, Gott, und erfahre mein Herz (Trinity VIII)	A min.	atbSATB Hn 2Ob 2Oba Str Bc	28: 137	I/18: 129	after Z 2164 (/6); text after Ps 139:23 (/1: → BWV 234/6), by Heermann (/6)	00168
136/6	1.	1723-07-18	chorale setting "Wo soll ich fliehen hin" (s. 9)	B min.	SATB	28: 164	III/2.2: 191	after Z 2164; text by Heermann	11293
137	1.	1725-08-19	Cantata Lobe den Herren, den mächtigen König der Ehren (Trinity XII)	C maj.	satbSATB 3Tr Tmp 2Ob Str Bc	28: 165	I/20: 171	after Z 1912a–c; text by Neander; /2 → BWV 650; /5 → 120.2/8	00169
137/5	1.	1725-08-19	chorale setting "Lobe den Herren, den mächtigen König der Ehren" (s. 5)	C maj.	SATB	28: 196	III/2.1: 56	after Z 1912a–c; text by Neander; → BWV 120.2/8	11220
137/5	1.	1725-08-19	chorale setting "Hast du denn, Jesu, dein Angesicht gänzlich verborgen"	C maj.	SATB	28: 196	III/2.1: 56	after Z 1912a–c; text by Fritsch	11220
138	1.	1723-09-05	Cantata Warum betrübst du dich, mein Herz (Trinity XV)	B min.	satbSATB 2Oba Str Bc	28: 197	I/22: 19	after Z 1689a; /4 → BWV 236/3	00170
139	1.	1724-11-12	Cantata Wohl dem, der sich auf seinen Gott (Trinity XXIII)	E maj.	satbSATB 2Oba Str Bc	28: 223	I/26: 97	after Z 2383; text after Rube	00171
140	1.	1731-11-25	Cantata Wachet auf, ruft uns die Stimme (Trinity XXVII)	E♭ maj.	stbSATB Hn 2Ob Tai Vl Str Bc	28: 249	I/27: 149	after Z 8405a, text after Nicolai; /4 → BWV 645	00172
140/7	1.	1731-11-25	chorale setting "Wachet auf, ruft uns die Stimme" (s. 3)	E♭ maj.	SATB	28: 284	III/2.1: 19; III/2.2: 101	after Z 8405a, text by Nicolai	11183
143	1.	c. 1709–1711?	Cantata Lobe den Herrn, meine Seele (New Year)	B♭ maj.	stbSATB 3Hn Tmp Bas Str Bc	30: 43	I/4: 165 rev 2: 3	after Z 4373; text after Ps 146, by Ebert (/2, /7)	00175
143	1.	c. 1709–1711?	Cantata Lobe den Herrn, meine Seele (New Year)	C maj.	stbSATB 3Tr Tmp Bas Str Bc		rev 2: 119	after Z 4373; text after Ps 146, by Ebert (/2, /7)	00175
144	1.	1724-02-06	Cantata Nimm, was dein ist, und gehe hin (Septuagesima)	B min.	satSATB 2Ob Oba Str Bc	30: 75	I/7: 1	after Z 5629 (/3), 7568 (/6); text after Mt 20:14 (/1), by Rodigast (/3), Albert of Prussia (/6)	00176
144/3	1.	1724-02-06	chorale setting "Was Gott tut, das ist wohlgetan" (s. 1)	G maj.	SATB	30: 87	III/2.1: 34; III/2.2: 36	after Z 5629; text by Rodigast	11204
144/6	1.	1724-02-06	chorale setting "Was mein Gott will, das g'scheh allzeit" (s. 1)	B min.	SATB	30: 92	III/2.1: 35; III/2.2: 157	after Z 7568; text by Albert of Prussia	11205
145/1–5	1.	1729-04-19	Cantata Ich lebe, mein Herze, zu deinem Ergötzen (Easter 3)	D maj.	stbSATB Tr Fl 2Ob Str Bc	30: 104	I/10: 111	by Bach, C. P. E.?; after Z 1743 (/5); text by Picander, Herman (/5)	00177
145/5	1.	1729-04-19	chorale setting "Erschienen ist der herrlich Tag" (s. 14)	F♯ min.	SATB	30: 122	III/2.2: 214	by Bach, C. P. E.?; after Z 1743; text by Herman	11321
145/5	1.	1729-04-19	chorale setting "Erschienen ist der herrlich Tag"	E min.	SATB		III/2.2: 12	by Bach, C. P. E.?; after Z 1743; text by Herman	11321
145/a	1.		chorale setting "Auf, mein Herz, des Herren Tag" (s. 1)	D maj.	SATB (or) Org	30: 93	III/2.2: 195	by Bach, C. P. E.; after Z 3432b; text by Neumann	10584
145/a	1.		chorale setting "Jesus, meine Zuversicht"	D maj.	SATB (or) Org	30: 93	III/2.2: 195	by Bach, C. P. E.; after Z 3432b; text by L. H. of Brandenb.	09019
146	1.	1726-05-12 or 1727-05-04	Cantata Wir müssen durch viel Trübsal (Jubilate)	D min.	satbSATB Fl 2Ob 2Oba Tai Str **Org** Bc	30: 123	I/11.2: 65	after Z 6551 (/8); text after Acts 14:22 (/2); /1 & /2 ↔ BWV 1052/1 & /2	00179
147.2	1.	1723-07-02	Cantata Herz und Mund und Tat und Leben (Visitation)	D maj.	satbSATB Tr 2Ob Oba 2Odc Str Bc	30: 191	I/28: 63	after BWV 147.1/1–5 (/1, /3, /7, /5, /9), Z 6551 (/6, /10); text by Franck, S. (/1, /3, /7, /5, /9), Janus (/6, /10)	00180
147.1	1.	1716-12-20	Cantata Herz und Mund und Tat und Leben (Advent IV)	D maj.	satbSATB Tr Ob Str Bc		I/1	text by Franck, S., Kolross (/6); /1–/5 → BWV 147.2/1, /3, /7, /5, /9	00181
148	1.	1723-09-19	Cantata Bringet dem Herrn Ehre seines Namens (Trinity XVII)	D maj.	atSATB Tr 2Oba Odc Str Bc	30: 235	I/23: 253	after Z 2164 (/6); text after Picander	00182
148/6	1.	1723-09-19	chorale setting "Wo soll ich fliehen hin"	F♯ min. F min.	SATB	30: 260	III/2.2: 16	after Z 2164; text by Heermann	11291
149	1.	1729-09-29	Cantata Man singet mit Freuden vom Sieg (Michaelmas)	D maj.	satbSATB 3Tr Tmp 3Ob Bas Str Vne Bc	30: 261	I/30: 97	after BWV 208/15 (/1), Z 8326 (/7); text by Picander, Schalling (/7)	00183
149/1a	1.	Fall 1729	Cantata opening: "Concerto" (incomplete; abandoned alternative start of BWV 149?)	D maj.	SATB 3Tr Tmp 2Ob Str Bc		I/40; I/30	in SBB P 175; was BWV Anh. 198	01509
150	1.	1707-07-10	Cantata Nach dir, Herr, verlanget mich (Trinity III)	B min.	satbSATB Bas 2Vl Bc	30: 301	I/41: 3	text after Ps 25 (/2, /4, /6)	00184
151	1.	1725-12-27	Cantata Süßer Trost, mein Jesus kömmt (Christmas 3)	G maj.	satbSATB Fl Vl Oba Str Bc	32: 1	I/3.1: 169	after Z 198 (/5); text by Lehms, Herman (/5)	00185
151/5	1.	1725-12-27	chorale setting "Lobt Gott, ihr Christen allzugleich" (s. 8)	G maj.	SATB	32: 16	III/2.2: 30	after Z 198; text by Herman	11307
152	1.	1714-12-30	Cantata Tritt auf die Glaubensbahn (Christmas I)	E min.	sb Fl Ob Va Vdg Bc	32: 17	I/3.2: 3	text by Franck, S.; /1 ↔ BWV 536/2, → 536a/2	00186
153	1.	1724-01-02	Cantata Schau, lieber Gott, wie meine Feind (Christmas II)	A min.	atbSATB Str Bc	32: 41	I/4: 199	after Z 4431 (/1), 5385a (/5), 533a (/9); text by Denicke (/1), Gerhardt (/5), Moller (/9), after Is 14:10 (/3)	00187
153/1	1.	1724-01-02	chorale setting "Schau, lieber Gott, wie meine Feind" (s. 1)	A min.	SATB	32: 43	III/2.2: 3	after Z 4431; text by Denicke	11288
153/1	1.	1724-01-02	chorale setting "Ach Gott, vom Himmel sieh darein"	A min.	SATB	32: 43	III/2.2: 3	after Z 4431; text by Martin Luther	11288
153/5	1.	1724-01-02	chorale setting "Befiehl du deine Wege" (s. 5)	A min.	SATB	32: 46	III/2.2: 14	after Z 5385a; text by Gerhardt	11326
153/5	1.	1724-01-02	chorale setting "Herzlich tut mich verlangen"	A min.	SATB	32: 46	III/2.2: 14	after Z 5385a; text by Knoll	11326
153/9	1.	1724-01-02	chorale setting "Ach Gott, wie manches Herzeleid" (ss. 16–18)	C maj.	SATB	32: 58	III/2.2: 128	after Z 533a; text by Moller	11282
154	1.	1724-01-09	Cantata Mein liebster Jesus ist verloren (Epiphany I)	B min.	atbSATB 2Oba Str Hc Bc	32: 59	I/5: 89	after Z 6551 (/3), 3449 (/8); text by Janus (/3), Keymann (/8), after Lk 2:49; /3 → BWV 359	00188
154/3	1.	1724-01-09	chorale setting "Jesu, meiner Seelen Wonne" (s. 2)	A maj.	SATB	32: 65	III/2.1: 87; III/2.2: 137	after Z 6551; text by Janus; → BWV 359	11249
154/3	1.	1724-01-09	chorale setting "Werde munter, mein Gemüte"	A maj.	SATB	32: 65	III/2.1: 87; III/2.2: 137	after Z 6551; text by Rist	11249
154/8	1.	1724-01-09	chorale setting "Meinen Jesum lass ich nicht, weil" (s. 6)	D maj.	SATB	32: 82	III/2.1: 88; III/2.2: 88	after Z 3449; text by Keymann	11251
155	1.	1716-01-19; 1724-01-16	Cantata Mein Gott, wie lang, ach lange? (Epiphany II)	D min.	satbSATB Bas Str Bc	32: 83	I/5: 173	after Z 4430 (/5); text by Franck, S., Speratus (/5)	00189
155/5	1.	1716-01-19; 1724-01-16	chorale setting "Es ist das Heil uns kommen her" (s. 12)	F maj.	SATB	32: 96	III/2.2: 194	after Z 4430; text by Speratus	11302
156	1.	1727-01-26 or 1729-01-23	Cantata Ich steh mit einem Fuß im Grabe (Epiphany III)	F maj.	satbSATB Ob Str Bc	32: 97	I/6: 91	after Z 2383 (/2), 4438 (/6); text by Picander, Schein (/2), Bienemann (/6); /1 ↔ BWV 1056/2	00190
156/6	1.	1727-01-26 or 1729-01-23	chorale setting "Herr, wie du willt, so schicks mit mir" (s. 1)	C maj.	SATB	32: 114	III/2.2: 185	after Z 4438; text by Bienemann	11294
157.2	1.	after 1727-02-06	Cantata Ich lasse dich nicht, du segnest mich denn (funeral; later: Purification)	B min.	tbSATB Fl Ob Oba Va 2Vl Bc	32: 115	I/34: 41	after Z 3449 (/5), BWV 157.1 (same text)	00191
157.1	1.	1727-02-06	Cantata Ich lasse dich nicht, du segnest mich denn (funeral)		tbSATB Fl Oba Va Bc		I/34	text by Picander, Keymann (/5), after Gen 32:27 (/1); → BWV 157.2	11366
158	1.	c. 1725–1735	Cantata Der Friede sei mit dir (Purification; later: Easter 3)	D maj.	sbSATB Ob Vl Bc	32: 141	I/10: 129	after Z 6531 (/2), 7012a (/4); text by Albinus (/2), Luther (/4; ↔ BWV 279)	00192
158/4	1.	c. 1725–1735	chorale setting "Christ lag in Todes Banden" (s. 5)	E min.	SATB	32: 154	III/2.1: 24; III/2.2: 155	after Z 7012a; text by Luther; ↔ BWV 279	11187
159	1.	1729-02-27	Cantata Sehet, wir gehn hinauf gen Jerusalem (Estomihi)	C min.	satbSATB Ob Str Bc	32: 155	I/8: 153	after Z 5385a (/2), 6288a–b (/5); text by Picander, Gerhardt (/2), Stockmann (/5), after Lk 18:31 (/1), Jh 19:30 (/4)	00193
159/5	1.	1729-02-27	chorale setting "Jesu Leiden, Pein und Tod" (s. 33)	E♭ maj.	SATB	32: 168	III/2.1: 41; III/2.2: 33	after 6288a–b; text by Stockmann	11206
161	1.	1716-09-27	Cantata Komm, du süße Todesstunde (Trinity XVI; 1st version)	C maj.	atSATB 2Fl Str Org Bc	33: 1	I/23: 1, 33	after Z 5385a; text by Franck, S., Knoll; → BWV 161, v2	00195
161/6	1.	1716-09-27	chorale setting "Herzlich tut mich verlangen" (s. 4)	A min.	SATB	33: 27	III/2.1: 29; III/2.2: 160	after Z 5385a; text by Knoll	11194
161/6	1.	1716-09-27	chorale setting "Befiehl du deine Wege"	A min.	SATB	33: 27	III/2.1: 29; III/2.2: 160	after Z 5385a; text by Gerhardt	11194
161, v2	1.	1723–1750?	Cantata Komm, du süße Todesstunde (Trinity XVI; 2nd version)	C maj.	satSATB 2Fl Str Bc		I/23: 33	after BWV 161; text by Franck, S., Knoll	00196
162.1	1.	1716-10-25	Cantata Ach! ich sehe, itzt, da ich zur Hochzeit gehe (Trinity XX)	A min.	satbSATB Str Bc		I/25: 1	after Z 6783 (/6); text by Franck, S., Rosenmüller (/6); → BWV 162.2	00197
162.2	1.	1723-10-10	Cantata Ach! ich sehe, itzt, da ich zur Hochzeit gehe (Trinity XX)	B min.	satbSATB Hn Str Bc	33: 29 (in a)	I/25: 23	after BWV 162.1 (same text)	11367
163	1.	1715-11-24	Cantata Nur jedem das Seine (Trinity XXIII)	B min.	satbSATB Str 2Vc Bc	33: 47	I/26: 77	after Z 3449 (/5), 2177 (/6); text by Franck, S., Heermann (/6)	00198
164	1.	1725-08-26	Cantata Ihr, die ihr euch von Christo nennet (Trinity XIII)	G min.	satbSATB 2Fl 2Ob Str Bc	33: 65	I/21: 57	after Z 4297a (/6); text by Franck, S., Cruciger (/6)	00199
164/6	1.	1725-08-26	chorale setting "Herr Christ, der einge Gottes Sohn" (s. 5)	B♭ maj.	SATB	33: 88	III/2.1: 59; III/2.2: 57	after Z 4297a; text by Cruciger	11224
165	1.	1715-06-16; 1724-06-04	Cantata O heilges Geist- und Wasserbad (Trinity)	G maj.	satbSATB Fag Str Bc	33: 89	I/15: 1	after Z 159 (/6); text by Franck, S., Helmbold (/6)	00200
166	1.	1724-05-07	Cantata Wo gehest du hin? (Cantate)	B♭ maj.	satbSATB Ob Str Bc	33: 105	I/12: 1	after Z 4486 (/3), 2778 (/6); text by Franck, S., Ringwaldt (/3), E. J. of Schwarzburg-Rudolstadt (/6), after Jh 16:5 (/1); /2 → BWV 584	00201
166/6	1.	1724-05-07	chorale setting "Wer weiß, wie nahe mir mein Ende" (s. 1)	G min.	SATB	33: 122	III/2.2: 116	after 2778; text by E. J. of Schwarzburg-Rudolstadt	11311
167	1.	1723-06-24	Cantata Ihr Menschen, rühmet Gottes Liebe (24 June: feast of John the Baptist)	G maj.	satbSATB Tr Ob Odc Str Bc	33: 123	I/29: 1	after Z 8244 (/5); text by Gramann (/5)	00202
168	1.	1725-07-29	Cantata Tue Rechnung! Donnerwort (Trinity IX)	B min.	satbSATB 2Oba Str Bc	33: 147	I/19: 87	after Z 4486 (/6); text by Franck, S., Ringwaldt (/6)	00203
168/6	1.	1725-07-29	chorale setting "Herr Jesu Christ, du höchstes Gut" (s. 8)	B min.	SATB	33: 166	III/2.2: 52	after Z 4486; text by Ringwaldt	11198
169	1.	1726-10-20	Cantata Gott soll allein mein Herze haben (Trinity XVIII)	D maj.	aSATB 2Oba Tai Str Org Bc	33: 167	I/24: 59	after Z 2029a (/7); text by Birkmann, Luther (/7); /1 & /5 ↔ BWV 1053/1 & /2	00204
169/7	1.	1726-10-20	chorale setting "Nun bitten wir den Heiligen Geist" (s. 3)	A maj.	SATB	33: 192	III/2.1: 30; III/2.2: 54	after Z 2029a; text by Luther	11196
170	1.	1726-07-28	Cantata Vergnügte Ruh, beliebte Seelenlust (Trinity VI)	D maj.	a Oba Fl Str Org Bc	33: 193	I/17.2: 61	text by Lehms	00205
171	1.	1729-01-01	Cantata Gott, wie dein Name, so ist auch dein Ruhm (New Year)	D maj.	satbSATB 3Tr Tmp 2Ob Str Bc	35: 1	I/4: 131	after BWV 205 (/4), 41/6 (/6); text by Picander, Hermann (/6)	00206
171/6	1.	1729-01-01	chorale setting "Jesu, nun sei gepreiset" (s. 2)	D maj.	SATB	35: 32	I/4: 131	after BWV 41/6; text by Hermann	11253
172.1	1.	1714-05-20	Cantata Erschallet, ihr Lieder, erklinget, ihr Saiten! (Pentecost; 1st version = Weimar version; incomplete)	C maj.	(SATB) 3Tr Tmp (Fl? Ob 2)Vl 2Va Vc Bas (Bc)		I/13	after Z 8359 (/6); text by Franck, S.?, Nicolai (/6), after Jh 14:23 (/2); → BWV 172.2	00207
172/6	1.	1714-05-20	chorale setting "Wie schön leuchtet der Morgenstern" (s. 4)	F maj.	SATB	35: 69	III/2.2: 187	after Z 8359; text by Nicolai	11314
172.2	1.	1724-05-28	Cantata Erschallet, ihr Lieder, erklinget, ihr Saiten! (Pentecost; 2nd version = 1st Leipzig version)	D maj.	satbSATB 3Tr Tmp Fl Ob Oba Bas 2Vl 2Va Vc Bc		I/13: 1	after BWV 172.1 (same text); → BWV 172.3	00208
172.3	1.	1731-05-13	Cantata Erschallet, ihr Lieder, erklinget, ihr Saiten! (Pentecost; 3rd version = 2nd Leipzig version)	C maj.	satbSATB 3Tr Tmp Ob Bas 2Vl 2Va Vc Org Bc	35: 35	I/13: 33	after BWV 172.2 (same text)	00209
173.2	1.	1727-06-02; 1731-05-14	Cantata Erhöhtes Fleisch und Blut (Pentecost 2)	D maj.	satbSATB 2Fl Str Bc	35: 71	I/14: 1	after BWV 173.1	00210
173.1	1.	1722-12-10	Secular cantata Durchlauchtster Leopold (birthday of Leopold of Anhalt-Köthen)	D maj.	satbSATB 2Fl Str Bc	34: 1	I/35: 95	→ BWV 173.2 (/1–/5, /8), 175/4 (/7)	00211
174	1.	1729-06-06	Cantata Ich liebe den Höchsten von ganzem Gemüte (Pentecost 2)	G maj.	atbSATB 2Cdc 2Ob Tai 3Vl 3Va 3Vc Str Bc	35: 103	I/14: 63	after BWV 1048/1 (/1), Z 8326 (/5); text by Picander, Schalling (/5)	00212
174/5	1.	1729-06-06	chorale setting "Herzlich lieb hab ich dich, o Herr" (s. 1)	D maj.	SATB	35: 157	III/2.1: 78; III/2.2: 32	after Z 8326; text by Schalling	11244
175	1.	1725-05-22	Cantata Er rufet seinen Schafen mit Namen (Pentecost 3)	G maj.	atbSATB 2Tr 3Fl Str Vc Bc	35: 159	I/14: 147	after BWV 173.1/7 (/4), BWV 59/3 (/7); text by Ziegler, C. M., Rist (/7), after Jh 10:3 & 6 (/1 & /5)	00213
175/7	1.	1725-05-22	chorale setting "O Gottes Geist, mein Trost und Rat" (s. 9)	G maj.	SATB	35: 177	III/2.1: 76	after Z 7445a; text by Rist	11243
175/7	1.	1725-05-22	chorale setting "Komm, Heiliger Geist, Herre Gott"	G maj.	SATB	35: 177	III/2.1: 76	after Z 7445a; text by Luther	11243
176	1.	1725-05-27	Cantata Es ist ein trotzig und verzagt Ding (Trinity)	C min.	sabSATB 2Ob Odc Str Bc	35: 179	I/15: 17	after Z 7246 (/6); text by Ziegler, C. M., Gerhardt (/6), after Jer 17:9 (/1)	00214
176/6	1.	1725-05-27	chorale setting "Was alle Weisheit in der Welt" (s. 8)	C min.	SATB	35: 198	III/2.2: 67	after Z 7246; text by Gerhardt	11296
176/6	1.	1725-05-27	chorale setting "Christ unser Herr zum Jordan kam"	C min.	SATB	35: 198	III/2.2: 67	after Z 7246; text by Luther	11296
177	1.	1732-07-06	Cantata Ich ruf zu dir, Herr Jesu Christ (Trinity IV)	G min.	satSATB 2Ob Odc Bas Vl Str Bc	35: 199	I/17.1: 77	after Z 7400; text by Agricola, J.	00215
177/5	1.	1732-07-06	chorale setting "Ich ruf zu dir, Herr Jesu Christ" (s. 5)	G min. E min	SATB	35: 234	III/2.1: 50; III/2.2: 40	after Z 7400; text by Agricola, J.	11211
178	1.	1724-07-30	Cantata Wo Gott der Herr nicht bei uns hält (Trinity VIII)	A min.	atbSATB Hn 2Ob 2Oba Str Bc	35: 235	I/18: 159	after Z 4441a; text after Jonas	00216
179	1.	1723-08-08	Cantata Siehe zu, daß deine Gottesfurcht nicht Heuchelei sei (Trinity XI)	G min.	stbSATB 2Ob 2Odc Str Bc	35: 273	I/20: 55	after Z 2778 (/6); text after JS 1:34 (/1), by Tietze (/6); /1 & /3 → BWV 236/1 & /5; /5 → 234/4	00217
179/6	1.	1723-08-08	chorale setting "Ich armer Mensch, ich armer Sünder" (s. 1)	A min.	SATB	35: 292	III/2.1: 55; III/2.2: 196	after Z 2778; text by Tietze	11218
179/6	1.	1723-08-08	chorale setting "Wer nur den lieben Gott lässt walten	A min.	SATB	35: 292	III/2.1: 55; III/2.2: 196	after Z 2778; text by Neumark	11218
180	1.	1724-10-22	Cantata Schmücke dich, o liebe Seele (Trinity XX)	F maj.	satbSATB 2Fl Fl Ob Odc Str Vc Bc	35: 293	I/25: 41	after Z 6923; text after Franck, J.	00218
180/7	1.	1724-10-22	chorale setting "Schmücke dich, o liebe Seele" (s. 9)	F maj. E♭ maj.	SATB	35: 322	III/2.1: 24; III/2.2: 15	after Z 6923; text by Franck, J.	11188
181	1.	1724-02-13	Cantata Leichtgesinnte Flattergeister (Sexagesima)	E min.	satbSATB Tr Fl Ob Str Bc	37: 1	I/7: 133		00219
182	1.	1714-03-25	Cantata Himmelskönig, sei willkommen (Palm Sunday)	B♭ maj.	atbSATB Fl (Ob 2)Vl 2Va Bc		I/8.2: 1	after 6288a–b (/7); text by Franck, S.?, Stockmann (/7), after Ps 40:8–9 (/3)	00220
182	1.	1724-03-25; 1728-03-21	Cantata Himmelskönig, sei willkommen (Palm Sunday)	G maj.	atbSATB Fl (Ob 2)Vl 2Va Bc	37: 21	I/8.2: 43	after 6288a–b (/7); text by Franck, S.?, Stockmann (/7), after Ps 40:8–9 (/3)	00220
183	1.	1725-05-13	Cantata Sie werden euch in den Bann tun (Exaudi)	A min.	satbSATB 2Oba 2Odc Str Vc Bc	37: 59	I/12: 187	after Z 5267 (/5); text by Ziegler, C. M., Gerhardt (/5), after Jh 16:2 (/1)	00221
183/5	1.	1725-05-13	chorale setting "Zeuch ein zu deinen Toren" (s. 5)	A min.	SATB	37: 74	III/2.2: 70	after Z 5267; text by Gerhardt	11325
183/5	1.	1725-05-13	chorale setting "Helft mir Gotts Güte preisen"	A min.	SATB	37: 74	III/2.2: 70	after Z 5267; text by Eber	11325
184.2	1.	1724-05-30; 1727-06-03; 1731-05-15	Cantata Erwünschtes Freudenlicht (Pentecost 3)	G maj.	satSATB 2Fl Str Bc	37: 75	I/14: 119	after BWV 184.1/1–/4 & /6, Z 5690 (/5); text by Wildenfels (/5)	00222
184.2/5	1.	1724-05-30; 1727-06-03; 1731-05-15	chorale setting "O Herre Gott, dein göttlich Wort" (s. 8)	D maj. G maj.	SATB	37: 95	III/2.1: 17; III/2.2: 10	after Z 5690; text by Wildenfels	11181
184.1	1.	1721-01-01	Secular cantata (incomplete)	G maj.	sb 2Fl Vl Str Bc (?)		I/35	→ BWV 184.2/1–/4, /6	00223
185.1	1.	1715-07-14	Cantata Barmherziges Herze der ewigen Liebe (Trinity IV)	F♯ min.	satbSATB Ob Str Bc	37: 101	I/17.1: 1	after Z 7400 (/6); text by Franck, S., Agricola, J. (/6); → BWV 185.2	00224
185/6	1.	1715-07-14	chorale setting "Ich ruf zu dir, Herr Jesu Christ" (s. 1)	F♯ min.	SATB	37: 118	III/2.1: 50	after Z 7400; text by Agricola, J.	11212
185.2	1.	1723-06-20	Cantata Barmherziges Herze der ewigen Liebe (Trinity IV)	G min.	satbSATB Tr Ob Str Bc	37: 101	I/17.1: 1	after BWV 185.1 (same text)	11368
186.2	1.	1723-07-11	Cantata Ärgre dich, o Seele, nicht (Trinity VII)	G min.	satbSATB 2Ob Tai Bas Str Bc	37: 119	I/18: 15	after BWV 186.1/1–/5 (/1, /3, /5, /8, /10), Z 4430 (/6, /11); text by Franck, S. (/1, /3, /5, /8, /10), Speratus (/6, /11)	00225
186.1	1.	1716-12-13	Cantata Ärgre dich, o Seele, nicht (Advent III; incomplete)		stbSATB 2Ob Odc Tai Bas Str Bc		I/1	text by Franck, S., Helmbold (/6); → BWV 186.2/1, /3, /5, /8, /10	00226
187	1.	1726-08-04	Cantata Es wartet alles auf dich (Trinity VII)	G min.	sabSATB 2Ob Str Bc	37: 155	I/18: 91	after Z 4816e (/7); text: Meiningen, after Ps 104:27–28 (/1), Mt 6:31–32 (/4), by Vogel (/7); /1, /3, /4, /5 → BWV 235/6, /4, /3, /5	00227
187/7	1.	1726-08-04	chorale setting "Singen wir aus Herzensgrund" (ss. 4, 6)	G min.	SATB	37: 191	III/2.2: 61	after Z 4816e; text by Vogel	11344
188	1.	1728-10-17	Cantata Ich habe meine Zuversicht (Trinity XXI)	D min.	satbSATB 2Ob Tai Str Org Bc	37: 193	I/25: 265	after Z 2164 (/6); text by Picander; /1 ↔ BWV 1052/3	00228
190.1	1.	1724-01-01	Cantata Singet dem Herrn ein neues Lied (New Year; incomplete)	D maj.	atbSATB 3Tr Tmp 3Ob Oba Bas Str Bc	37: 227	I/4: 1	after Z 8652 (/1–/2), 8477a (/7); text by Luther (/1–/2), Hermann (/7); → BWV 190.2/1, /2, /3, /5	00230
190/7	1.	1724-01-01	chorale setting "Jesu, nun sei gepreiset" (s. 2)	D maj.	SATB	37: 257	III/2.2: 189	after 8477a; text by Hermann (/7)	11306
190.2	1.	1730-06-25	Cantata Singet dem Herrn ein neues Lied (200th anniversary of the Augsb. Confess.; incomplete)		atbSATB 3Tr Tmp 3Ob Str Bc (?)		I/34	after BWV 190/1, /2, /3, /5; text by Picander, Luther (/1–/2, /7)	00231
191	1.	1743–1746	Cantata Gloria in excelsis Deo (Christmas)	D maj.	stSSATB 3Tr Tmp 2Fl 2Ob Str Bc	41: 1	I/2: 171	after BWV 232/4, /5, /8, /12; text: Lk 2:14, doxology	00232
192	1.	autumn 1730?	Cantata Nun danket alle Gott (incomplete)	G maj.	sbSATB 2Fl 2Ob Str Bc	41: 65	I/34: 107	after Z 5142; text by Rinkart	00233
193.2	1.	1727-08-25	Cantata Ihr Tore zu Zion (council election; incomplete)	D maj.	saSA(TB) 2Ob Str (Bc)	41: 91	I/32.1: 201	after BWV 193.1/1, /7, /9	00234
193.1	1.	1727-08-03	Secular cantata Ihr Häuser des Himmels, ihr scheinenden Lichter (name day of Friedrich August II; incomplete)		saSA(TB) 2Ob Str (Bc)		I/36	text by Picander; → BWV 193.2/1, /3, /5	00235
194.3	1.	1724-06-04; 1731-05-20	Cantata Höchsterwünschtes Freudenfest (Trinity; 1st Leipzig version)	B♭ maj.	stbSATB 3Ob Bas Str Bc	29: 99	I/31: 145	after BWV 194.2 (same text); → BWV 194.4	00236
194.4	1.	1726-06-16	Cantata Nun lasst uns Gott, dem Herren? (Trinity; 2nd Leipzig version)	B♭ maj.	stbSATB 3Ob Bas Str Bc	29: 99	I/31: 145, 235	after BWV 194.3/12, /2, /3, /4, /5, /7, /10	00237
194.2	1.	1723-11-02	Cantata Höchsterwünschtes Freudenfest (Störmthal version: consecration of church and organ)	B♭ maj.	sabSATB 3Ob Bas Str Bc	29: 99	I/31: 123	after BWV 194.1/1, /3, /5, /7, /9, Z 6543 (/6), 159 (/12); text by Heermann (/6), Gerhardt (/12); → BWV 194.3	00238
194.2/6	1.	1723-11-02	chorale setting "Treuer Gott, ich muß dir klagen" (ss. 6–7)	B♭ maj. G maj.	SATB	29: 124	III/2.1: 20; III/2.2: 35, 152	after Z 6543; text by Heermann	11184
194.2/6	1.	1723-11-02	chorale setting "Jesu, deine tiefen Wunden"	B♭ maj. G maj.	SATB	29: 124	III/2.1: 20; III/2.2: 35, 152	after Z 6543; text by Heermann	11184
194.2/6	1.	1723-11-02	chorale setting "Freu dich sehr, o meine Seele"	B♭ maj. G maj.	SATB	29: 124	III/2.1: 20; III/2.2: 35, 152	after Z 6543	11184
194.2/12	1.	1723-11-02	chorale setting "Wach auf, mein Herz, und singe" (ss. 9–10)	B♭ maj.	SATB	29: 138	III/2.1: 20; III/2.2: 52, 152	after Z 159; text by Gerhardt	11185
194.2/12	1.	1723-11-02	chorale setting "Nun lasst uns Gott dem Herren"	B♭ maj.	SATB	29: 138	III/2.1: 20; III/2.2: 52, 152	after Z 159; text by Helmbold	11185
194.1	1.	1717–1723?	Secular cantata model for church cantata versions of BWV 194 (incomplete)	B♭ maj.	3Ob Str &?		I/35	→ BWV 194.2/1, /3, /5, /8, /10	00239
195.3	1.	c.1748–1749	Cantata Dem Gerechten muß das Licht (wedding; last version)	D maj.	satbSATB 3Tr Tmp 2Hn 2Fl 2Ob 2Oba Str Bc	13^{1}: 1	I/33: 171	after BWV 195.2, Z 198 (/6); text after Ps 97:11–12 (/1), by Gerhardt (/6)	00242
195.1	1.	1727–1731	Cantata Dem Gerechten muß das Licht (wedding; 1st version, lost)		SATB 3Tr Tmp 2Fl 2Ob Str Bc		I/33	→ BWV 195.2	00240
195.2	1.	c. 1742	Cantata Dem Gerechten muß das Licht (wedding; 2nd version, incomplete)		SATB &?		I/33	after BWV 195.1, 30.1/5, /1 (/6, /8); text after Ps 97:11–12 (/1); → BWV 195.3	00241
196	1.	1708-06-05?	Cantata Der Herr denket an uns (wedding)	C maj.	stbSATB Str Bc	13^{1}: 71	I/33: 1	text after Ps. 115: 12–15	00243
197.2	1.	1736–1737	Cantata Gott ist unsre Zuversicht (wedding)	D maj.	sabSATB 3Tr Tmp 2Ob 2Oba Bas Str Bc	13^{1}: 95	I/33: 117	after Z 2029a (/5), 2778 (/10), BWV 197.1/4, /6 (/6, /8); text by Luther (/5)	00244
197.2/5	1.	1736–1737	chorale setting "Nun bitten wir den Heiligen Geist" (s. 3)	A maj.	SATB	13^{1}: 128	III/2.2: 46	after Z 2029a; text by Luther	11328
197.2/10	1.	1736–1737	chorale setting "Wer nur den lieben Gott lässt walten"	B min.	SATB	13^{1}: 144	III/2.2: 37	after Z 2778; text by Neumark	11313
197.1	1.	1728-12-25	Cantata Ehre sei Gott in der Höhe (Christmas; incomplete)	D maj.	abSATB 2Fl Oba Bas Str Vc Bc	41: 109	I/2: 63	after Z 5206b–c (/7); text by Picander, Ziegler, C. (/7; ↔ BWV 398), after Lk 2:14 (/1); /4 & /6 → BWV 197.2/6, /8	00245
197.1/7	1.	1728-12-25	chorale setting "Ich freue mich in dir" (s. 4)	D maj.	SATB	41: 114	III/2.2: 182	after Z 5206b–c; text by Ziegler, C.; ↔ BWV 398	11298
197.1/7	1.	1728-12-25	chorale setting "O Gott, du frommer Gott"	D maj.	SATB	41: 114	III/2.2: 182	after Z 5206b–c; text by Heermann; ↔ BWV 398	11298
198	1.	1727-10-17	Secular cantata Laß, Fürstin, laß noch einen Strahl a.k.a. Trauer-Ode (funeral ceremony for Christiane Eberhardine)	B min.	satbSATB 2Fl 2Ob 2Oba Str 2Vdg 2Lu Bc	13^{3}: 1; 44: 54	I/38: 179	text by Gottsched, J. C.; ↔ BWV 244a, 247	00246
199.2	1.	1720–1721	Cantata Mein Herze schwimmt im Blut (Trinity XI; Köthen version; incomplete)	D min.	s Ob Str Vdg Bc	41: 202	I/20: 48	after BWV 199.1 (same text); → 199.3	00247
199.3	1.	1723-08-08	Cantata Mein Herze schwimmt im Blut (Trinity XI; Leipzig version)	D min.	s Ob Str Vc Bc		I/20: 23	after BWV 199.2 (same text)	00248
199.1	1.	1714-08-12	Cantata Mein Herze schwimmt im Blut (Trinity XI; Weimar version)	C min.	s Ob Str Bc	NBG 13^{2}	I/20: 1	text by Lehms, Heermann (/6); → BWV 199.2	00249
200	1.	1742–1743 (JSB)	Aria Bekennen will ich seinen Namen	E maj.	a (2Vl) Bc		I/28.1: 189	after Stölzel; text after Lk 2:29–32	00250
201	1.	autumn 1729	Secular cantata Geschwinde, ihr wirbelnden Winde a.k.a. Der Streit zwischen Phoebus und Pan (dramma per musica)	D maj.	sattbb 3Tr Tmp 2Fl 2Ob Oba Str Bc	11^{2}: 1; 44: 85	I/40: 117	text by Picander; /7 → BWV 212/20	00251
202	1.	c.1718?	Secular cantata Weichet nur, betrübte Schatten (wedding)	G maj.	s Ob Str Bc	11^{2}: 73	I/40: 1	in D-LEb Peters Ms. R 8	00252
203	1.	c.1720?	Secular cantata Amore traditore	A min.	b Hc	11^{2}: 91	I/41: 31		00253
204	1.	1726–1727	Secular cantata Ich bin in mir vergnügt a.k.a. Von der Vergnügsamkeit	B♭ maj.	s Fl 2Ob Str Bc	11^{2}: 103	I/40: 79	text after Hunold	00254
205.1	1.	1725-08-03	Secular cantata Zerreißet, zersprenget, zertrümmert die Gruft a.k.a. Der zufriedengestellte Aeolus (dramma per musica for August Friedrich Müller)	D maj.	satbSATB 3Tr Tmp 2Hn 2Fl 2Ob Oba Str Va Vdg Bc	11^{2}: 137; 44: 39	I/38: 1	text by Picander; → BWV 205.2/1–/7, /9–/11, /13, /15, 171/4, 216/7	00255
205.2	1.	1734-02-19	Secular cantata Blast Lärmen, ihr Feinde (dramma per musica; music lost but largely reconstructable; coronation of Augustus III)		satbSATB 3Tr Tmp 2Hn 2Fl 2Ob Oba Str Va Vdg Bc		I/37	after BWV 205.1/1–/7, /9–/11, /13, /15; text by Picander?	00256
206.1	1.	1736-10-07 (1734?)	Secular cantata Schleicht, spielende Wellen (dramma per musica; 1st version: birthday of Augustus III)	D maj.	satbSATB 3Tr Tmp 3Fl 2Oba Str Bc	20^{2}: 1	I/36: 157	→ BWV 206.2	00257
206.2	1.	1740-08-03	Secular cantata Schleicht, spielende Wellen (dramma per musica; 2nd version: name day of Augustus III)	D maj.	satbSATB 3Tr Tmp 3Fl 2Ob 2Oba Str Bc		I/36: 157	after BWV 206.1	00258
207.1	1.	1726-12-11	Secular cantata Vereinigte Zwietracht der wechselnden Saiten (dramma per musica; appointment of professor Gottlieb Kortte)	D maj.	satbSATB 3Tr Tmp 2Fl 2Oba Tai Str Bc	20^{2}: 71	I/38: 97	after BWV 1046/3 (/1); → BWV 207.2/1, /3, /5, /7–/9	00259
207.2	1.	1735-08-03	Secular cantata Auf, schmetternde Töne der muntern Trompeten (dramma per musica; name day of Augustus III)	D maj.	satbSATB 3Tr Tmp 2Fl 2Oba Tai Str Bc	20^{2}: 139; 34: 345	I/37: 1	after BWV 207.1/1, /3, /5, /7–/9	00260
208.1	1.	1713-02-23	Secular cantata Was mir behagt, ist nur die muntre Jagd a.k.a. Hunting Cantata (1st version: birthday of Christian of Saxe-Weissenfels)	F maj.	sstb 2Hn 2Fl 2Ob Tai Bas Str Vc Bc (Vne)	29: 1	I/35: 1	text by Franck, S.; → BWV 208.2, 1040, 68/4, /2, 149/1	00261
1040	1.	1713-02-23	Trio (a.k.a. (Canonic) Trio Sonata; postlude to the Hunting Cantata?)	F maj.	Vl Ob Bc	29: 230	I/35: 1	after BWV 208.1/13; =BWV 208.1/13a	01222
208.2	1.	c.1715	Secular cantata Was mir behagt, ist nur die muntre Jagd a.k.a. Hunting Cantata (2nd version: for Ernst August I of Saxe-Weimar)	F maj.	sstb 2Hn 2Fl 2Ob Tai Bas Str Vc Bc (Vne)	29: 1	I/35: 1	after BWV 208.1 (near-identical text); → BWV 208.3	00262
208.3	1.	1742-08-03	Secular cantata Was mir behagt, ist nur die muntre Jagd (3rd version: name day of Augustus III)	F maj.	sstb 2Hn 2Fl 2Ob Tai Bas Str Vc Bc (Vne)?		I/37	after BWV 208.2; text after Franck, S.	00263
209	1.	1747?	Secular cantata Non sa che sia dolore (farewell of Lorenz Albrecht Beck?)	B min.	s Fl Str Bc	29: 43	I/41: 43	text after Metastasio	00264
210.2	1.	1741-09-19	Secular cantata O holder Tag, erwünschte Zeit (wedding)	A maj.	s Fl Oba Str Hc Vne	29: 67	I/40: 35	after BWV 210.1/1–/2, /4, /8, /10	00265
210.1	1.	1729-01-12	Secular cantata O angenehme Melodei (incomplete; homage to Christian of Saxe-Weissenfels)	A maj.	s (Fl Oba Str Bc)?	29: 245	I/39: 141	→ BWV 210.2/1–/2, /4, /8, /10	00266
211	1.	c.1734	Secular cantata Schweigt stille, plaudert nicht a.k.a. Coffee Cantata	G maj.	stb Fl Str Hc Bc	29: 139; 44: 86	I/40: 193	text by Picander	00267
212	1.	1742-08-30	Secular cantata Mer hahn en neue Oberkeet a.k.a. Peasant Cantata (Cantate burlesque; homage to Carl Heinrich von Dieskau)	G maj.	sb Hn Fl Str Bc	29: 173; 44: 132	I/39: 151	after BWV 1157/9 (/14), 201/7 (/20); text by Picander	00268
213	1.	1733-09-05	Secular cantata Laßt uns sorgen, laßt uns wachen a.k.a. Hercules auf dem Scheidewege (dramma per musica; birthday of Frederick Christian of Saxony)	F maj.	satbSATB 2Hn 2Ob Oba 2Vl 2Va Bc	34: 119	I/36: 1	text by Picander; /1, /3, /5, /7, /9, /11 → BWV 248/36, /19, /39, /41, /4, /29	00269
214	1.	1733-12-08	Secular cantata Tönet, ihr Pauken! Erschallet, Trompeten! (birthday of queen Maria Josepha)	D maj.	satbSATB 3Tr Tmp 2Fl 2Ob Oba Str Vne Bc	34: 175	I/36: 89	text by Picander; /1, /5, /7, /9 → BWV 248/1, /15, /8, /24	00270
215	1.	1734-10-05	Secular cantata Preise dein Glücke, gesegnetes Sachsen (anniversary of the election of Augustus III as king of Poland)	D maj.	stb2SATB 3Tr Tmp 2Fl 2Ob Oba Str Va Bc	34: 243	I/37: 85	after BWV 1157/1 (/1)?; text by Clauder; /7 → BWV 248/47	00271
216.1	1.	1728-02-05	Secular cantata Vergnügte Pleißenstadt (wedding; incomplete)	C maj.	sa &?		I/40: 21	after BWV 204/8 (/3), 205.1/13 (/7); text by Picander; → BWV 216.2/1, /3, /5, /7	00272
216.2	1.	1728–1731	Secular cantata Erwählte Pleißenstadt a.k.a. Apollo et Mercurius (incomplete)		at &?		I/39	after BWV 216.1/1, /3, /5, /7; text by Meißner after Picander	00273
