= Franz Conrad Romanus =

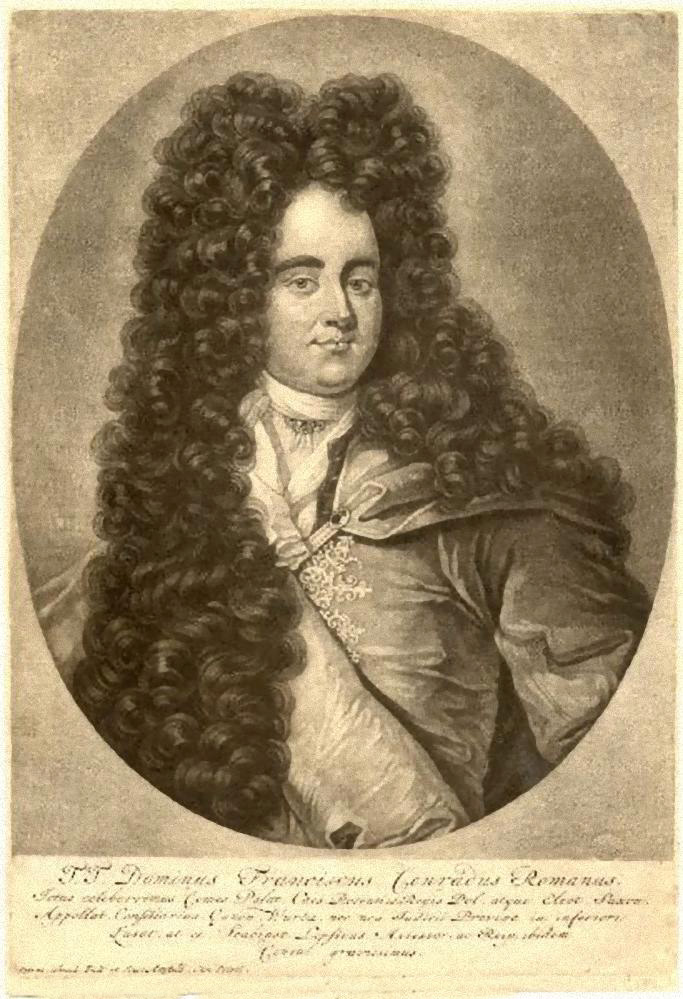
- Franz Conrad Romanus around 1700

Mayor of Leipzig
- In office 1701–1704
- Succeeded by: Johann Alexander Christ

Personal details
- Born: 7 March 1671 Leipzig, Electorate of Saxony
- Died: 14 May 1746 (aged 75) Königstein Fortress, Electorate of Saxony
- Spouse: Christiana Maria Brummer
- Children: 8
- Occupation: lawyer, burgomaister

Franz Conrad Romanus (born 7 March 1671 in Leipzig; † 14 May 1746 at Königstein Fortress) was mayor of Leipzig in 1701/02 and 1703/04, was arrested in 1705 and remained in prison without a verdict until his death.

== Life ==
=== 1671 to 1704 ===
The son of a Leipzig lawyer began studying law in his hometown in 1688. After graduating in 1692, he worked at the Court of Appeal and then practiced the profession of lawyer. Frederick August I, Elector of Saxony became aware of the young, aspiring lawyer and brought him to the court in Dresden.

Romanus was apparently personally very close to the Saxon Elector Frederick August I, and his election as mayor of Leipzig on 22 August 1701 was enforced by the elector over the Leipzig council.

During Romanus' first term of office in 1701/02, a variety of measures were taken to eliminate grievances, including the installation of street lighting, the construction of a sewer system, the paving of main streets and the establishment of a litter carrying service in 1701. As a result, despite his young age, he earned the reputation of a citizen father. But Romanus also always supported the Elector's frequent demands for money from the council. Romanus achieved the acceptance of the high payments to the court by the council members by doubling the annual salary of the councilors to 200 thalers and through other concessions from Frederick August I, such as the renewal of the city's privilege of free council elections, which the elector himself had first undermined.

Romanus recognized the musical genius of Georg Philipp Telemann, who came to Leipzig as a law student in 1701, and supported him in founding the later famous Collegium Musicum.

In Romanus' second term in office in 1703/04, an alms office was founded and a poor order was created, but the salary of the council members was also increased to 500 thalers. In addition to his mayoralty, Romanus was elected head of the St. Nicholas Church in February 1704. In May 1704 he was appointed Privy Councilor by the Elector, worth 700 thalers annually. A little later he handed over the mayor's office to his successor Johann Alexander Christ.

Romanus' downfall was initiated by the construction of his city palace. He enlarged the inherited property on the corner of Katharinenstrasse and Brühl through purchases and invested 150,000 thalers, a sum that far exceeded his financial circumstances, in the building project. This led Romanus to engage in irregularities and financial manipulation.

=== 1705 to 1746 ===
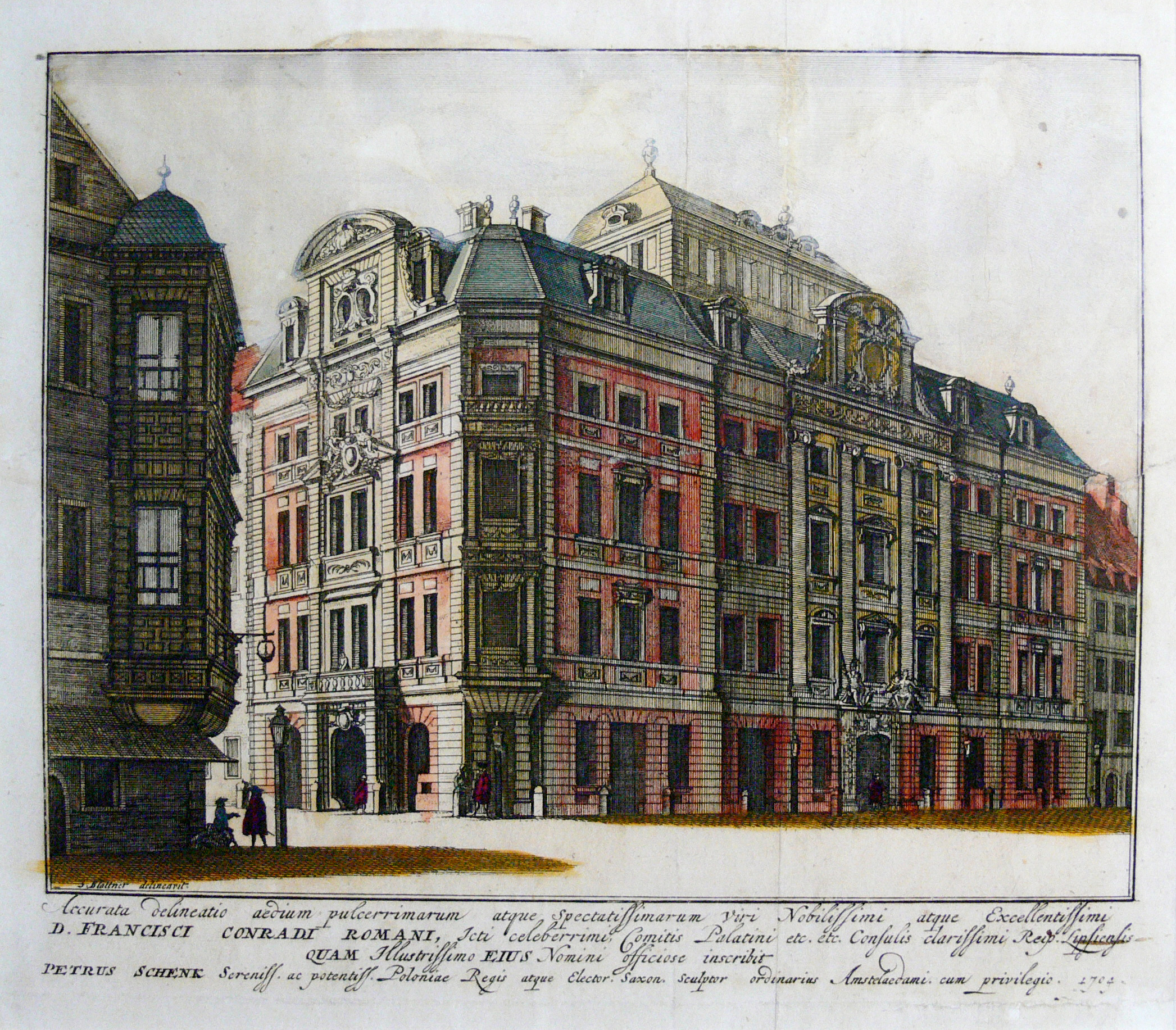
The Romanushaus, Brühl, Leipzig in 1704

In November 1704 and at the New Year's Trade Fair in 1705, Romanus' forged council promissory notes appeared. Romanus initially received support from the Elector, but was arrested in his palace (Romanushaus) on 16 January 1705 and imprisoned in the Pleissenburg. Four days later he was brought to Sonnenstein Castle in Pirna. During a house search, additional counterfeit promissory notes, a duplicate key to the mayor's desk and a wax print of the Grand Council seal were found, as well as amounts of money from the coffers of the council and St. Nicholas Church. At the beginning of September 1706, Romanus was taken to Königstein Fortress. The investigation into the events dragged on until 1710. Romanus made a request for mercy to the elector, which he rejected.

Demands from various creditors on the Romanus family led to bankruptcy proceedings in which Frederick August I intervened several times in favor of the family, as Romanus had acted in the elector's interest in many of his manipulations. In 1727 the bankruptcy proceedings were finally ended and most of Romanus' property became the property of his wife Christiana Maria, who also received the house.

After the death of Frederick August I in 1733, Romanus sent a request for clemency to Count Heinrich von Brühl, which was also rejected. Romanus remained imprisoned at Königstein without a verdict until his death on 14 May 1746.

== Conclusion ==
The reasons for Augustus II the Strong and Brühl's unforgiving behavior towards the former mayor of Leipzig remain mysterious and have not yet been proven.

Perhaps the Saxon Elector's applied harshness can be justified by the collapse of Leipzig's city finances in 1626. Due to a lack of profits from the Mansfeld copper mining, the trade fair city fell into debt and therefore declared itself insolvent. John George I, Elector of Saxony then set up an electoral commission that controlled the financial administration of the city of Leipzig until 1688. Since the representatives of Leipzig had considerable prestige in the assembly of estates, this led to the deterioration of the political position of the cities in Electoral Saxony and to the political strengthening of the nobility.

August II the Strong needed solid economic cities. Even the suspicion of irregularities was punished severely. Furthermore, at the beginning of the 18th century there were considerable difficulties in financing the state budget, building projects and wars. Only John Law and Joseph Süß Oppenheimer should be mentioned here, both of whom failed with their methods of restructuring the state budget. We should also remember Johann Friedrich Böttger, who was supposed to produce gold for the Elector, who was constantly demanding money, at the Albrechtsburg in Meissen.

== Marriage and offspring ==
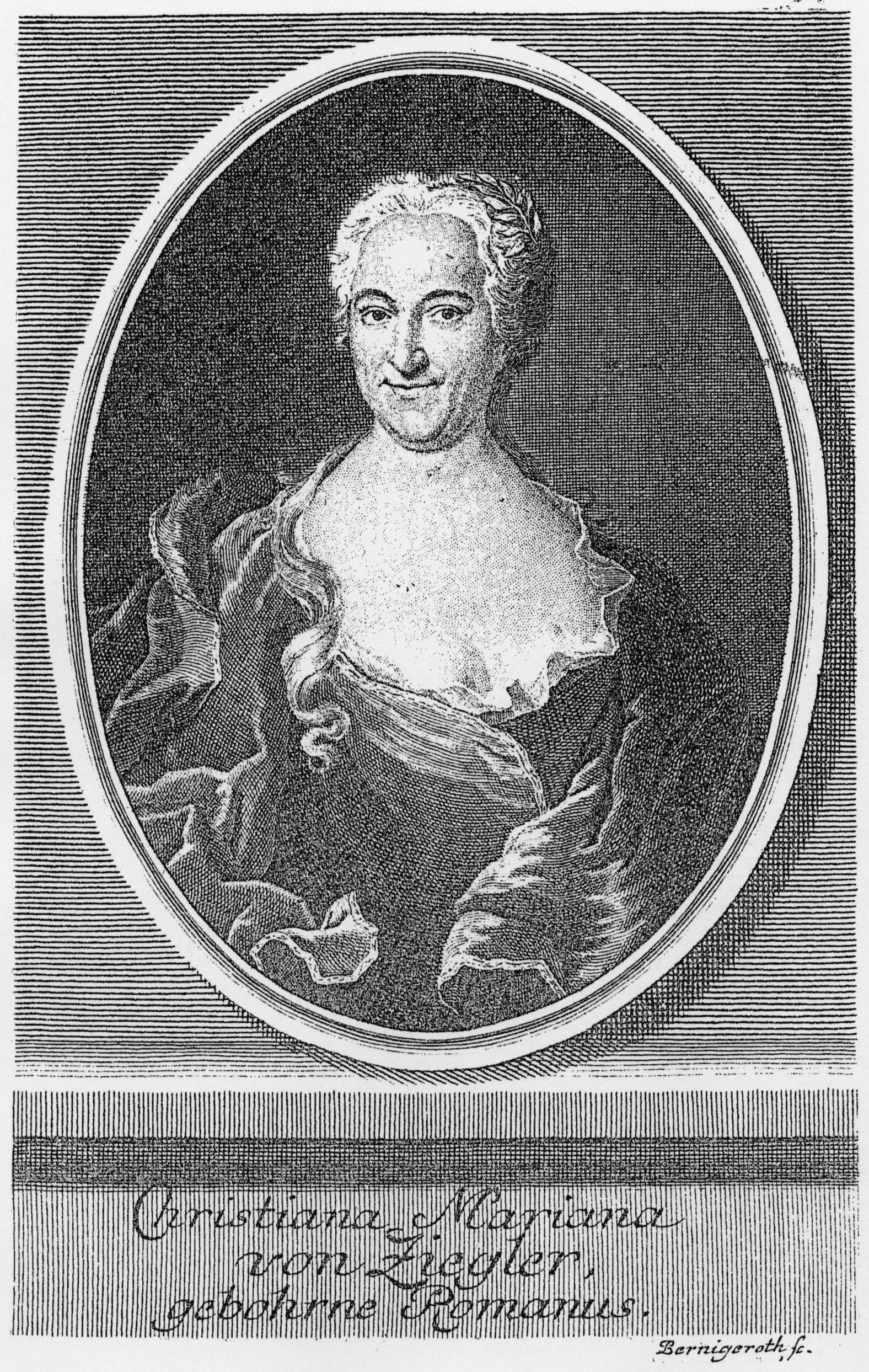
Christiana Mariana von Ziegler

Romanus married Christiana Maria Brummer in August 1694, with whom he had eight children, only two of whom reached adulthood.

Romanus' daughter Christiana Mariana von Ziegler (1695–1760) managed her father's property and organized a poetic-musical salon in the Romanus House. The “Zieglerin” herself played the piano, lute and flute. She wrote cantatas, wrote poetry and became friends with Johann Sebastian Bach and Johann Christoph Gottsched. In 1731 she became the first female member of the "Deutsche Gesellschaft" headed by Gottsched, a society for the research and promotion of German literature and language. The "Deutsche Gesellschaft" honored Christiana Mariana von Ziegler twice with the poetry prize, and the University of Wittenberg awarded her the title of "Imperially Crowned Poet" (Kaiserlich gekrönte Poetin) in 1733.

== Literature ==
- Mundus, Doris (2001). "Dem Kurfürsten zu Gefallen und zum eigenen Nutzen. Der Leipziger Bürgermeister Franz Conrad Romanus". Leipziger Blätter (in German). 38: 64–67.
- Fellmann, Walter (1982). Der Bürgermeister und das Stadtsäckel (in German) (2nd ed.). Berlin: Militärverlag der Deutschen Demokratischen Republik. pp. 28–37.
- Schneider, Susanne (1997-05-16). "Lebensgeschichte und literarisches Werk als Wechselbeziehung. Zur Frage der Geschlechter in den Texten der Dichterin Christiana Mariana von Ziegler (1695-1760)". kobra.uni-kassel.de (in German). Kassel.
- Schneider, Susanne (2000). ""wider Treu und Glauben gar gröblich gehandelt". Der 'Fall' des Leipziger Bürgermeisters Franz Conrad Romanus (1671-1746)" (PDF). kobra.uni-kassel.de (in German).
