= Romanus House =

- Romanushaus
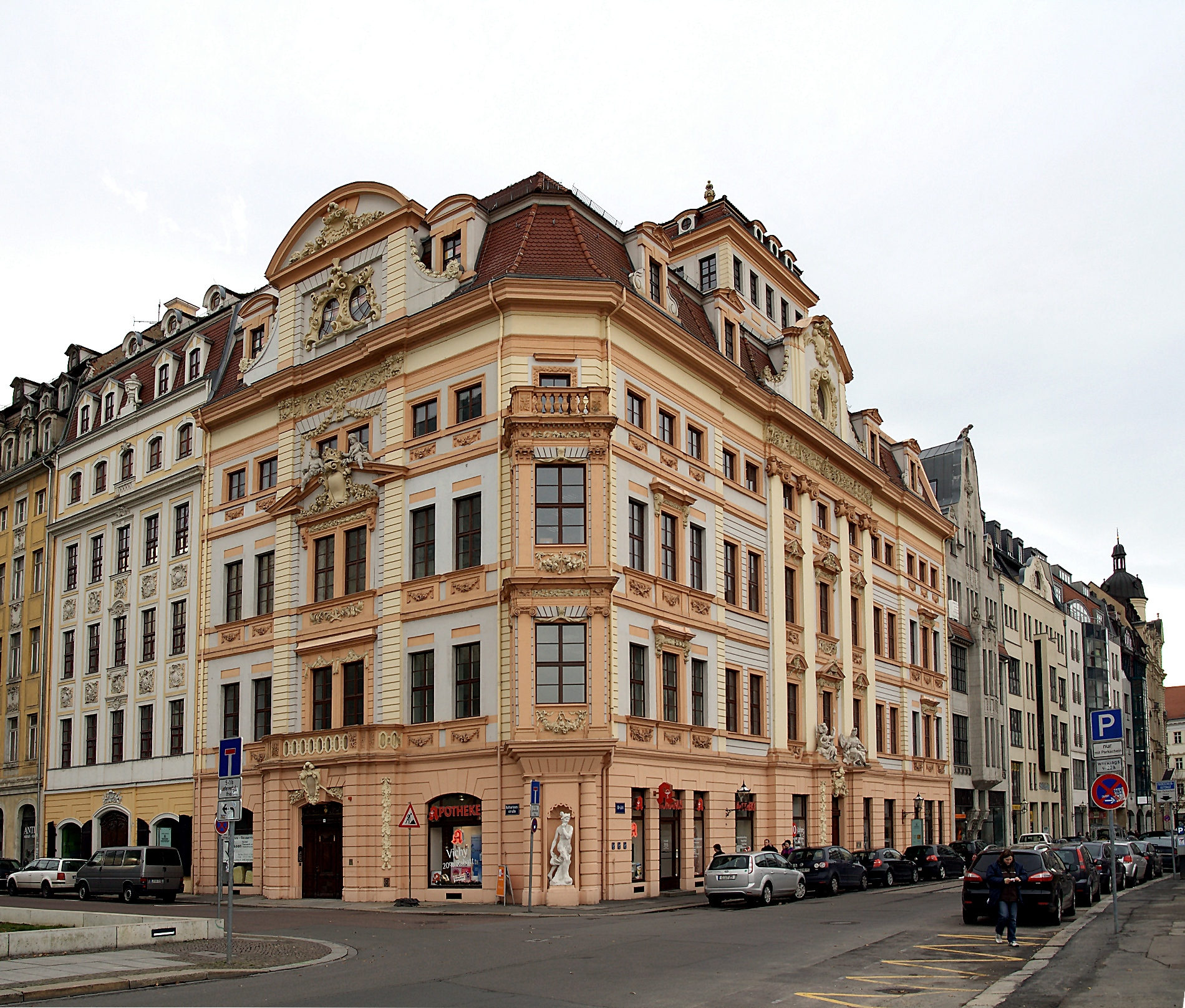
- Romanus House, general view of Brühl
- Interactive map of the Romanus House area

General information
- Type: Palace
- Architectural style: Baroque
- Location: Katharinenstrasse 23, Leipzig, Germany
- Coordinates: 51.342858°N 12.374811°E
- Construction started: 1702
- Completed: 1704
- Cost: 150,000 Thaler
- Client: Franz Conrad Romanus

Design and construction
- Architect: Johann Gregor Fuchs

Website
- https://www.romanushaus.com/

The Romanus House is a historic building in Leipzig, Germany, located in the borough Mitte, on the corner of Brühl and Katharinenstrasse. The city palace, built between 1701 and 1704, is one of the main works of Leipzig Baroque architecture influenced by Dresden. Previously used as a bourgeois residence building, it now serves as a commercial building. It is under heritage protection.

== Architecture ==
The Romanus House, which covers four properties, is designed as a baroque city palace with a plinth-like ground floor, three floors of different heights and a mansard roof. As a corner building, it has a north facade with 13 window axes facing Brühl and an east facade about half as wide with six window axes facing Katharinenstrasse. Both fronts are connected by a two-story bay window on the corner of the house, which is beveled at a 45-degree angle. The facades are vertically structured by risalits: on the north front, the three axes on the left and right edges as well as the three middle axes form a risalit, and on the east side the two middle window axes protrude from the alignment. The central risalit on the north side is closed by a richly decorated one-story tail gable with an oval window, and the risalit on the east facade is closed off by a similar gable with two kidney-shaped windows. In the southwest, the building encloses a small rectangular courtyard.

The roof originally had a one-story belvedere (roof pavilion) that was five windows wide and two windows deep and was placed in the middle above the north facade, which was removed in 1874 but rebuilt in 1996–1998 as part of repair and restoration work. During renovation between 1966 and 1969, all of the stucco ceilings and the two courtyard wings were destroyed. However, the latter were also restored to their old form.

The decorative elements are typically baroque. Most striking are the garlands on most of the window parapets, the entrances and the gables. A statue of Hermes, probably created by Balthasar Permoser (1651-1731), was recently placed in the niche under the corner bay window.

== History ==
The Romanus House owes its name to Franz Conrad Romanus (1671–1746), mayor of Leipzig from 1701, who had the building built between 1701 and 1704 according to plans by the Leipzig council master mason Johann Gregor Fuchs. In 1730, Romanus' daughter, the poet Christiana Mariana von Ziegler, set up a literature and music salon in the Romanus House. At this point in time, the palace no longer belonged to Romanus, who had since been convicted of forging council promissory notes and was imprisoned at Königstein Fortress, but to his wife Christiana Maria Romanus (née Brümmer), who sold it to Hofrat Oertel in 1735. The Oertel family sold it to the wine merchant George Wilhelm Richter in 1770. Two years later he opened the “Richtersche Café” on the second floor, but after he got heavily into debt, the building came into the possession of the merchant Jacob Marcus Dufour-Pallard. It was called “Dufour's House” after him in the 19th century. In 1906, the Steitmann brothers took over the Romanus House and let it completely renovate by the architect Otto Paul Burghardt in 1906/07. During the renovation from 1966 to 1969 according to plans by Rudolf Rohrer (1900–1968), all of the stucco ceilings and the two courtyard wings fell victim. At the beginning of the 1990s, the Romanus House was part of the Leipzig real estate holdings of the building contractor Jürgen Schneider. Opposite the Romanus House, on the other side of Katharinenstrasse, the Leipzig Museum Quarter with the Museum of Fine Arts was built between 1999 and 2017.

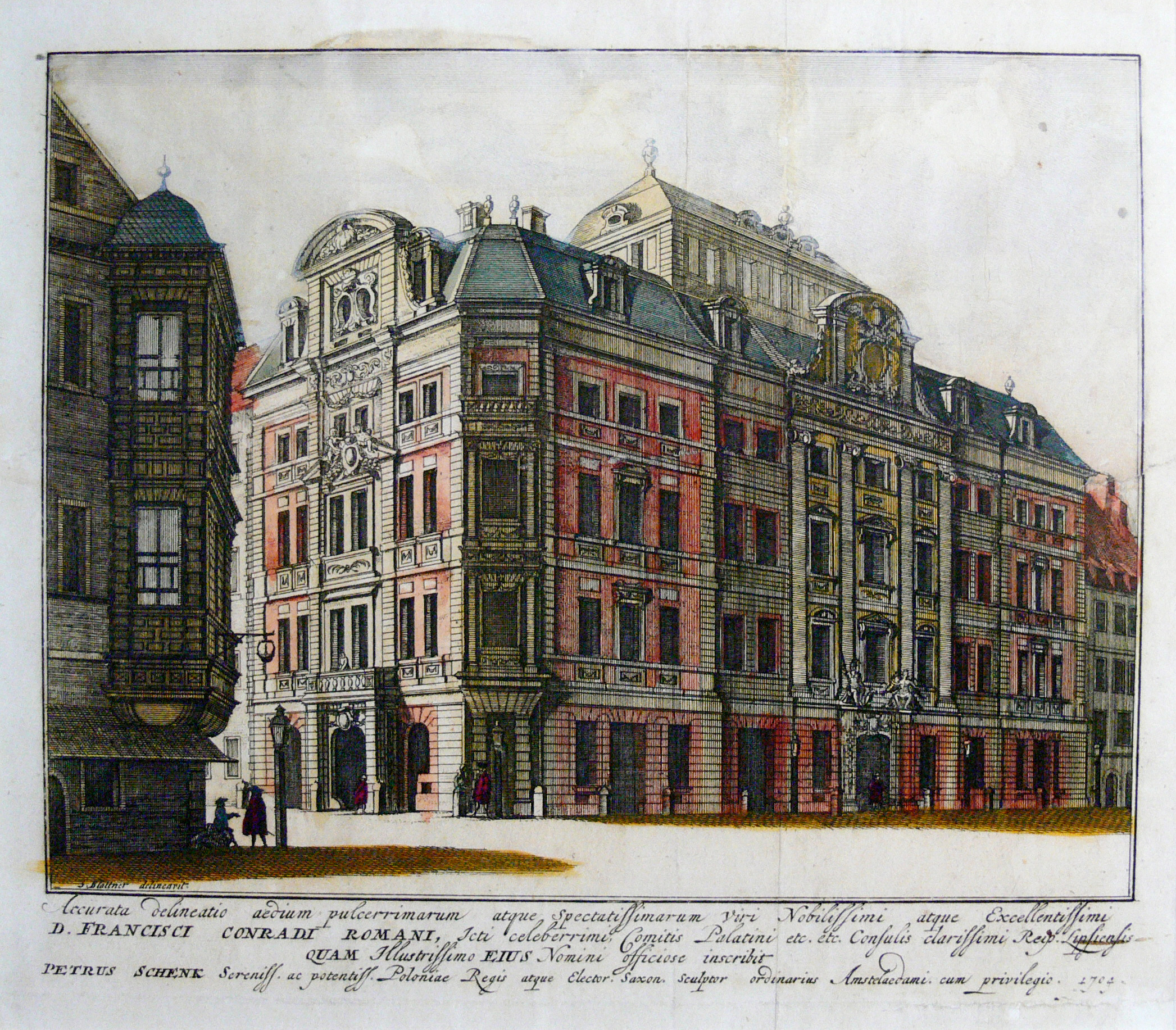
The Romanus House on an engraving from 1704

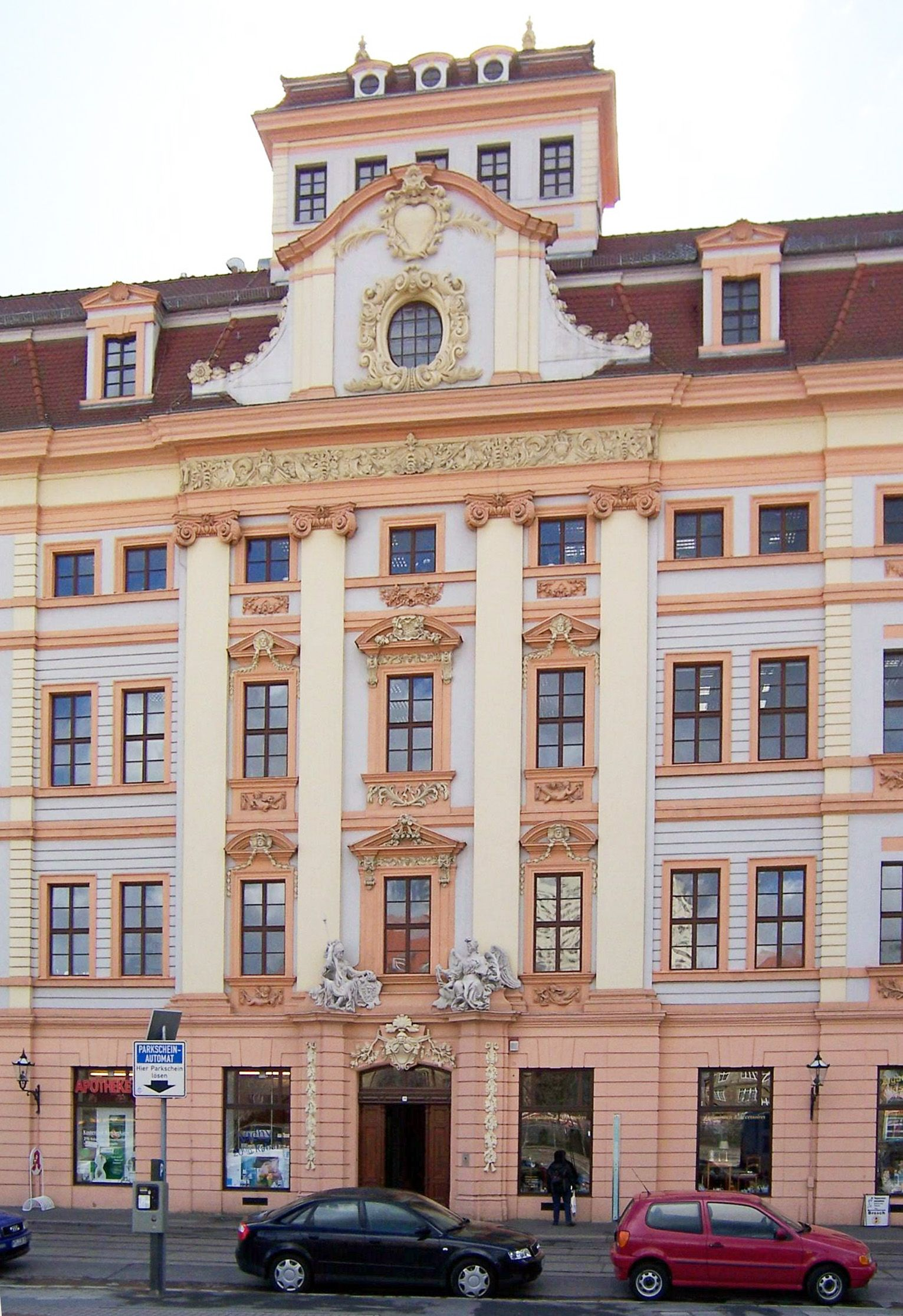
Romanus House: north facade facing Brühl

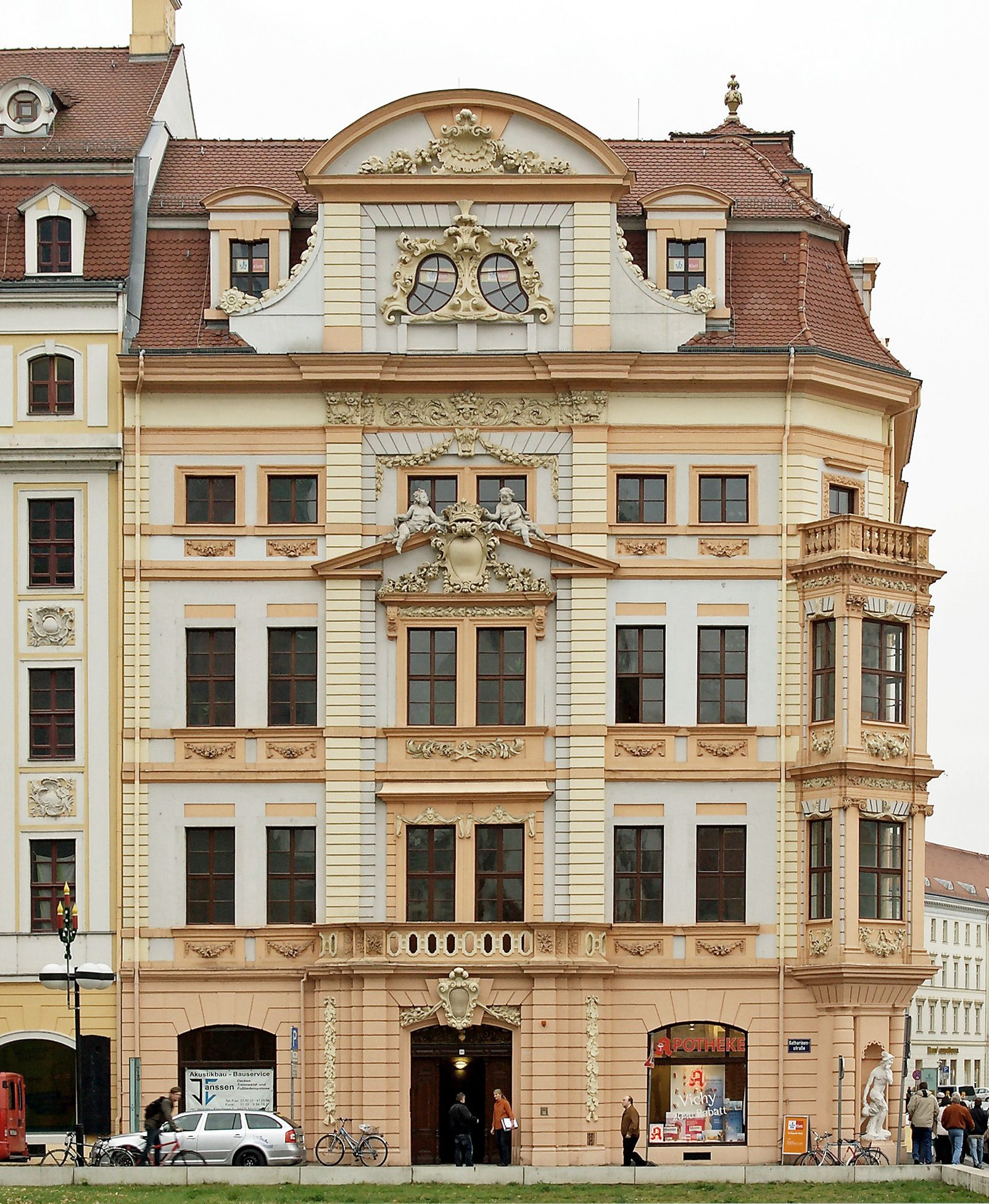
Romanus House: east facade facing Katharinenstrasse

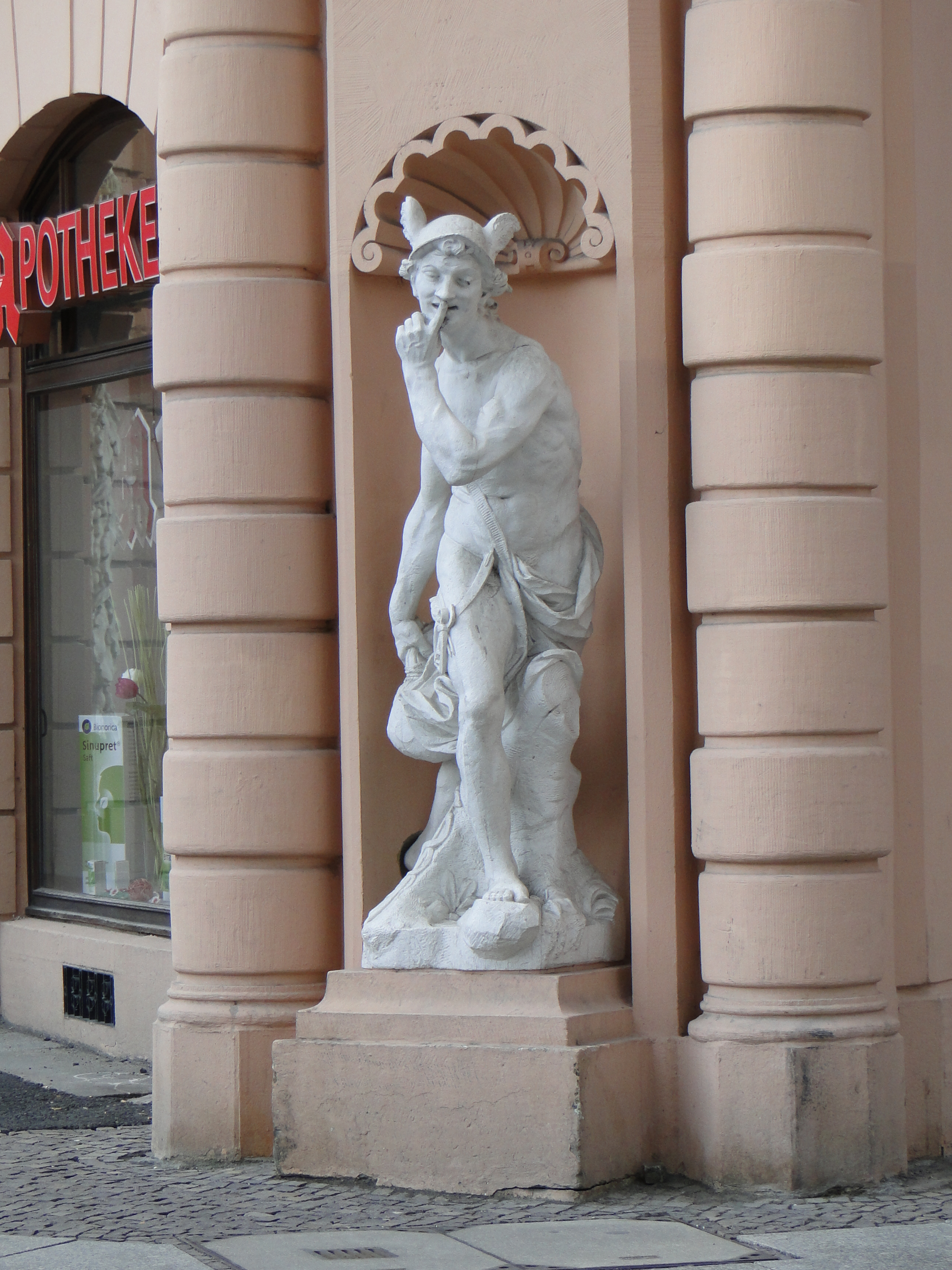
Statue of Hermes

== See also ==
- Architecture of Leipzig - Baroque era

== Literature ==
- Hocquél, Wolfgang (1983). Leipzig (in German). Leipzig: VEB E. A. Seemann Buch- und Kunstverlag. pp. 91f.
- Müller, Michael; Heise, Ulla (1990). Das Romanushaus in Leipzig: Geschichte und Geschichten (in German). Leipzig: Stadtkabinett für Kulturarbeit.
- Riedel, Horst (2005). Stadtlexikon Leipzig von A bis Z (in German). Leipzig: Pro Leipzig. pp. 507f. ISBN 3-936-50803-8.
- Schwarz, Alberto (2018). Das Alte Leipzig - Stadtbild und Architektur (in German). Beucha: Sax Verlag. pp. 97ff. ISBN 978-3-86729-226-9.
