= Es ist ein trotzig und verzagt Ding, BWV 176 =

Church cantata by Johann Sebastian Bach

Es ist ein trotzig und verzagt Ding
- BWV 176
- Church cantata by J. S. Bach
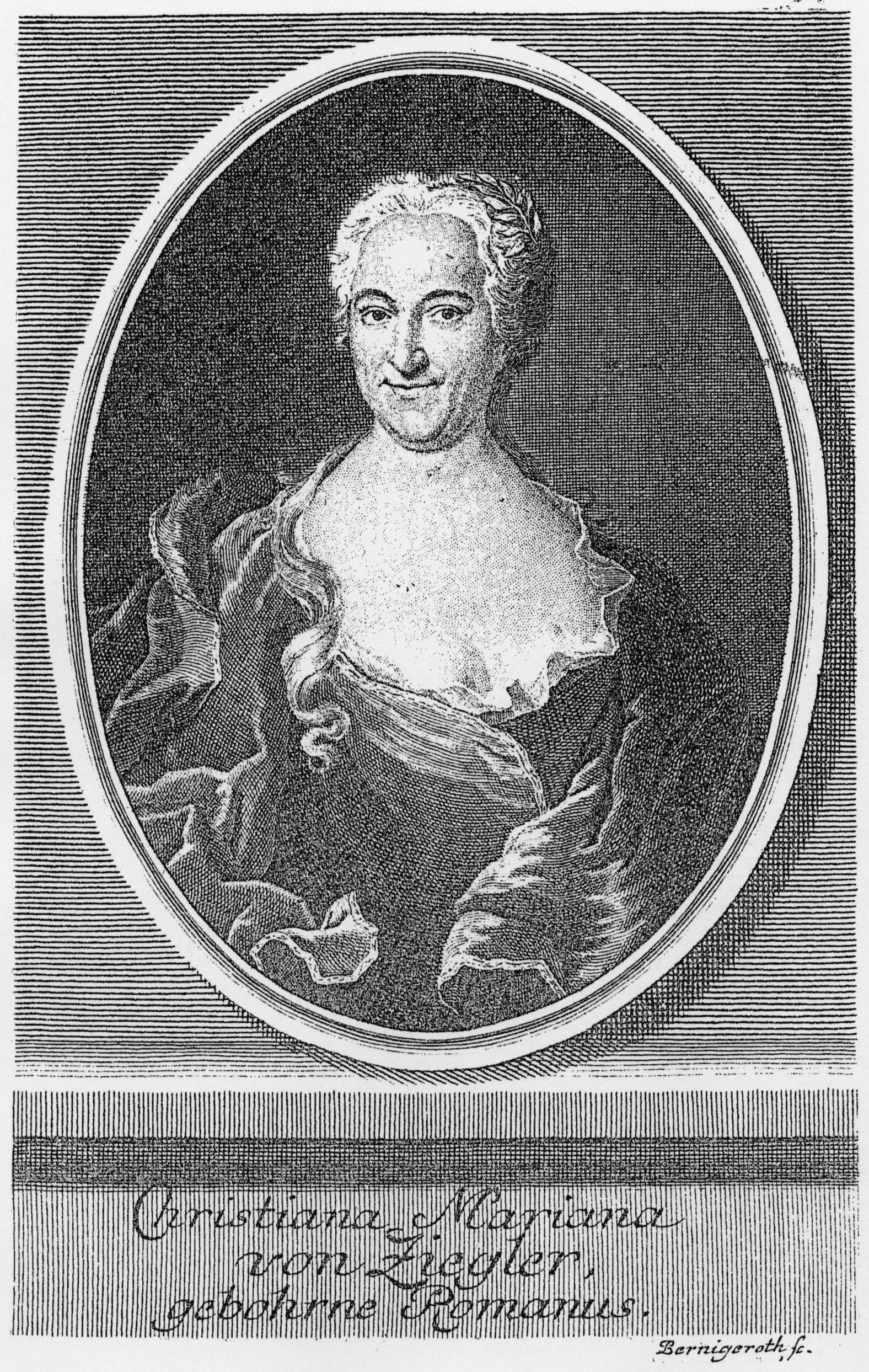
- Christiana Mariana von Ziegler, the author of the cantata text
- Occasion: Trinity Sunday
- Cantata text: Christiana Mariana von Ziegler
- Bible text: Jeremiah 17:9
- Chorale: by Paul Gerhardt
- Performed: 27 May 1725: Leipzig
- Movements: 6
- Vocal: SATB choir; solo: soprano, alto, bass
- Instrumental: 2 oboes; oboe da caccia; 2 violins; viola; continuo

Es ist ein trotzig und verzagt Ding (There is something defiant and despairing), BWV 176, is a church cantata by Johann Sebastian Bach. He composed it in Leipzig for Trinity Sunday on a text by Christiana Mariana von Ziegler and first performed it on 27 May 1725. This cantata concluded his second year of cantata compositions in Leipzig, the last of nine cantatas on texts by Ziegler that Bach set at the end of the second cantata cycle.

The cantata begins with a choral movement, setting a paraphrase from the Book of Jeremiah. The focus of her text is based on the meeting of Jesus and Nicodemus from the Gospel of John, namely that nobody could act as Jesus if God was not with him. For a closing chorale she used the eighth stanza from Paul Gerhardt's hymn "Was alle Weisheit in der Welt" which ends with a confession of the Trinity. Bach scored the cantata for three vocal soloists (soprano, alto and bass), a four-part choir and a Baroque instrumental ensemble of three two oboes, an oboe da caccia, strings and basso continuo. The opening movement is a fugue on a powerful theme, distinctly different from the chorale fantasias that had begun most cantatas of the second cantata cycle.

== History and words ==
Bach composed the cantata during his second year in Leipzig for Trinity. The prescribed readings for the Sunday were from the Epistle to the Romans, reflecting "depth of wisdom" (Romans 11:33–36), and from the Gospel of John, the meeting of Jesus and Nicodemus (John 3:1–15).

In his second year in Leipzig, Bach composed chorale cantatas between the first Sunday after Trinity Sunday and Palm Sunday, but for Easter returned to cantatas on more varied texts, possibly because he lost his librettist. Nine of his cantatas for the period between Easter and Pentecost are based on texts by Christiana Mariana von Ziegler, including this cantata. He later inserted most of them, including this one, into his third annual cantata cycle.

Ziegler took her main idea from the Gospel, that Nicodemus came to speak with Jesus at night, possibly afraid to be seen with him, and deduced from it ideas about the timidity of Christians in general. She opened her text with a paraphrase from the Old Testament, Jeremiah 17:9. In her version the heart of man is described as "trotzig und verzagt", the conflicting attributes rendered for example as "daring and shy" or "contrary and despairing"; "trotzig" literally means "defiant", and "verzagt" means "despondent". The poet continues with a paraphase of Nicodemus's words: that nobody could act as Jesus if God was not with him. She used the eighth stanza of Paul Gerhardt's hymn "Was alle Weisheit in der Welt", published in 1653, as a closing chorale, sung to the same melody as "Christ unser Herr zum Jordan kam".

Bach led the Thomanerchor in the first performance of the cantata on 27 May 1725. It was the conclusion of Bach's second year of cantata compositions in Leipzig.

== Music ==
=== Structure and scoring ===
Bach structured the cantata in six movements, framing solo recitatives and arias with two choral movements, a chorus and a closing chorale. Bach scored the work for three vocal soloists (soprano (S), alto (A) and bass (B)), a four-part choir, and a Baroque instrumental ensemble of two oboes (Ob), oboe da caccia (Oc), two violins (Vl), viola (Va) and basso continuo. The duration of the cantata is given as c. 13 minutes.

In the following table of the movements, the scoring follows the Neue Bach-Ausgabe. The keys and time signatures are taken from Alfred Dürr's standard work Die Kantaten von Johann Sebastian Bach, using the symbol for common time (4/4). The continuo, playing throughout, is not shown.

Movements of Es ist ein trotzig und verzagt Ding
No.	Title	Text	Type	Vocal	Winds	Strings	Key	Time
1	Es ist ein trotzig und verzagt Ding	Ziegler after Jeremiah	Chorus	SATB	2Ob Oc	2Vl Va	C minor	common time
2	Ich meine, recht verzagt	Ziegler	Recitative	A				common time
3	Dein sonst hell beliebter Schein	Ziegler	Aria	S		2Vl Va		common time
4	So wundre dich, o Meister, nicht	Ziegler	Recitative	B				common time
5	Ermuntert euch, furchtsam und schüchterne Sinne	Ziegler	Aria	A	2Ob Oc		E-flat major	3/8
6	Auf daß wir also allzugleich	Gerhardt	Chorale	SATB	2Ob Oc	2Vl Va	F minor C minor	common time

=== Movements ===
==== 1 ====
The opening chorus, "Es ist ein trotzig and verzagt Ding um aller Menschen Herze" (There is a contrary and despairing thing about all people's hearts), is a choral fugue in C minor. It begins without instrumental introduction, with a complex theme that illustrates both contrasting aspects of the human heart. The attribute "trotzig" (defiant) is given in a repeated high note reached by a triad fanfare, followed by an upward run with a surprising modulation, whereas "verzagt" (timid) appears as a sighing motif in chromatism. The strings accompany "trotzig" marked forte and "verzagt" piano, while the oboes double the voices. The Bach scholar Klaus Hofmann notes: "Bach has taken greater pleasure in depicting defiance than in representing timidity (and has thus departed to some extent from his librettist's intention). John Eliot Gardiner, who conducted the Bach Cantata Pilgrimage in 2000, translates the text as "There is something stubborn (or defiant or wilful) and fainthearted (or disheartened or despairing) about the human heart", describes the movement as a "dramatic antithesis between headstrong aggression and lily-livered frailty", and wonders "whether this arresting comment on the human condition reflected Bach's own views". The fugue is markedly different from the chorale fantasias that had opened most of Bach's cantatas of the second cantata cycle.

==== 2 ====
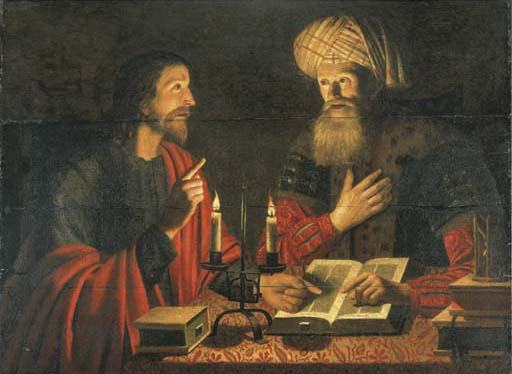
Jesus and Nicodemus, by Crijn Hendricksz, 1616–1645

A first secco recitative, for alto, introduces the fear of Nicodemus: "Ich meine, recht verzagt, daß Nikodemus sich bei Tage nicht, bei Nacht zu Jesu wagt" (I consider, truly downcast, that Nicodemus not by day, but at night dared to go to Jesus).

==== 3 ====
In a soprano aria, "Dein sonst hell beliebter Schein soll vor mich umnebelt sein" (Your otherwise bright and beloved brilliance should be shrouded in clouds for me), the first section is focused on the contrast of day and night, and a middle section explains why Nicodemus wants to speak to Jesus overcoming his fear: "denn sein Allmacht und sein Wesen, scheint, ist göttlich auserlesen" (for his great power and his being appears to be divinely chosen). The music of the aria is, in contrast to the stern opening, a "light-footed" gavotte, sometimes without continuo.

==== 4 ====
In a bass recitative, "So wundre dich, o Meister, nicht, warum ich dich bei Nacht ausfrage" (Then do not marvel, O Master, that I question you at night), Nicodemus speaks for the Christian. Bach added a quotation from the Gospel of John to Ziegler's printed text, from the verse following the prescribed reading immediately: "weil alle, die nur an dich glauben, nicht verloren werden (for whosoever believes in Thee, shall not perish),. He intensified it by setting it as an arioso.

==== 5 ====
An alto aria, "Ermuntert euch, furchtsam und schüchterne Sinne, erholet euch, höret, was Jesus verspricht (Be encouraged, fearful and timid minds, take hold of yourselves, hear what Jesus promises), is of siciliano character. Uwe Wolf described the opening theme as an "encouraging surge" and the music for "furchtsame" (timid)) as chromatically overshadowed. The aria features an unusual obbligato of three oboes in unison, including one low oboe da caccia. This alludes to the Trinity that is celebrated on the feast day and mentioned in the text: "Mit Danken und Loben Vater, Sohn und Heilgen Geist preisen, der dreieinig heißt (with thanks and praise, I shall glorify Father, Son, and Holy Spirit, who are Three in One).

While Bach indicated an oboe da caccia as the low oboe in the opening chorus, the header in the part of the fifth movement says "Taille", meaning a straight form of a tenor oboe. In the score of that movement, Bach simply noted "tutti gli Oboe i. unisuono" (all the oboes one sound). According to this prescription, the entire oboe part was copied into the parts of oboe I, oboe II and the taille. Bach corrected this by brackets for the two high oboes whenever the voice is accompanied, sometimes adding "tacet" (silent), indicating that all three oboes should play the ritornellos and only the low oboe throughout. It is unclear if this correction happened before the first performance or later.

==== 6 ====
The closing chorale, "Auf daß wir also allzugleich zur Himmelspforten dringen (Thus we shall, all together, press forward to the gates of heaven), is a four-part setting of the archaic modal melody of "Christ unser Herr zum Jordan kam".

The setting features many passing notes. At the very end Bach added two measures at a higher pitch on the words "ein Wesen, drei Personen" (one Being, three persons), reflecting the Trinity and a "remoteness of God from his relationship to humankind". Gardiner concludes that Bach "signs off his second Leipzig cycle with this cantata crammed with provocative thoughts and musical exegesis.

== Manuscripts and publication ==
Both the autograph score and the manuscript parts are extant. All sources are partly damaged, but Uwe Wolf, who prepared a critical edition by Carus, notes that almost all the music can be deciphered in at least one of the original sources.

The first critical edition appeared in 1888 as part of the first complete edition of the composer's work, the Bach-Gesellschaft-Ausgabe. The editor of the volume in question was Alfred Dörffel, who based it exclusively on the score. In the Neue Bach-Ausgabe, it appeared in 1967, edited by Norbert Freeman.

== Recordings ==
The selection is taken from the listing on the Bach Cantatas website. Instrumental groups playing period instruments in historically informed performances are marked green.

Recordings of Es ist ein trotzig und verzagt Ding
Title	Conductor / Choir / Orchestra	Soloists	Label	Year	Instr.
The RIAS Bach Cantatas Project (1949–1952)	Karl Ristenpart RIAS-Kammerchor RIAS-Kammerorchester	Gerda Lammers; Lotte Wolf-Matthäus; Gerhard Niese	Audite	1950	
Die Bach Kantate Vol. 39	Helmuth Rilling Gächinger Kantorei Bach-Collegium Stuttgart	Inga Nielsen; Carolyn Watkinson; Walter Heldwein	Hänssler	1980	
J. S. Bach: Das Kantatenwerk • Complete Cantatas • Les Cantates, Folge / Vol. 41	Gustav Leonhardt: Knabenchor Hannover; Collegium Vocale Gent; Leonhardt-Consort	soloist of the Knabenchor Hannover; Paul Esswood; Max van Egmond	Teldec	1988	Period
Bach Edition Vol. 15 – Cantatas Vol. 8	Pieter Jan Leusink Holland Boys Choir Netherlands Bach Collegium	Ruth Holton; Sytse Buwalda; Bas Ramselaar	Brilliant Classics	2000	Period
Bach Cantatas Vol. 27: Blythburgh/Kirkwell / For Whit Tuesday / For Trinity Sunday	John Eliot Gardiner Monteverdi Choir English Baroque Soloists	Ruth Holton; Daniel Taylor; Peter Harvey	Soli Deo Gloria	2000	Period
J. S. Bach: Complete Cantatas Vol. 15	Ton Koopman Amsterdam Baroque Orchestra & Choir	Johannette Zomer; Bogna Bartosz; Klaus Mertens	Antoine Marchand	2001	Period
J. S. Bach: Cantatas Vol. 35 (Cantatas from Leipzig 1725)	Masaaki Suzuki Bach Collegium Japan	Yukari Nonoshita; Robin Blaze; Peter Kooy	BIS	2007	Period
