= Christiana Mariana von Ziegler =

German poet (1695–1760)

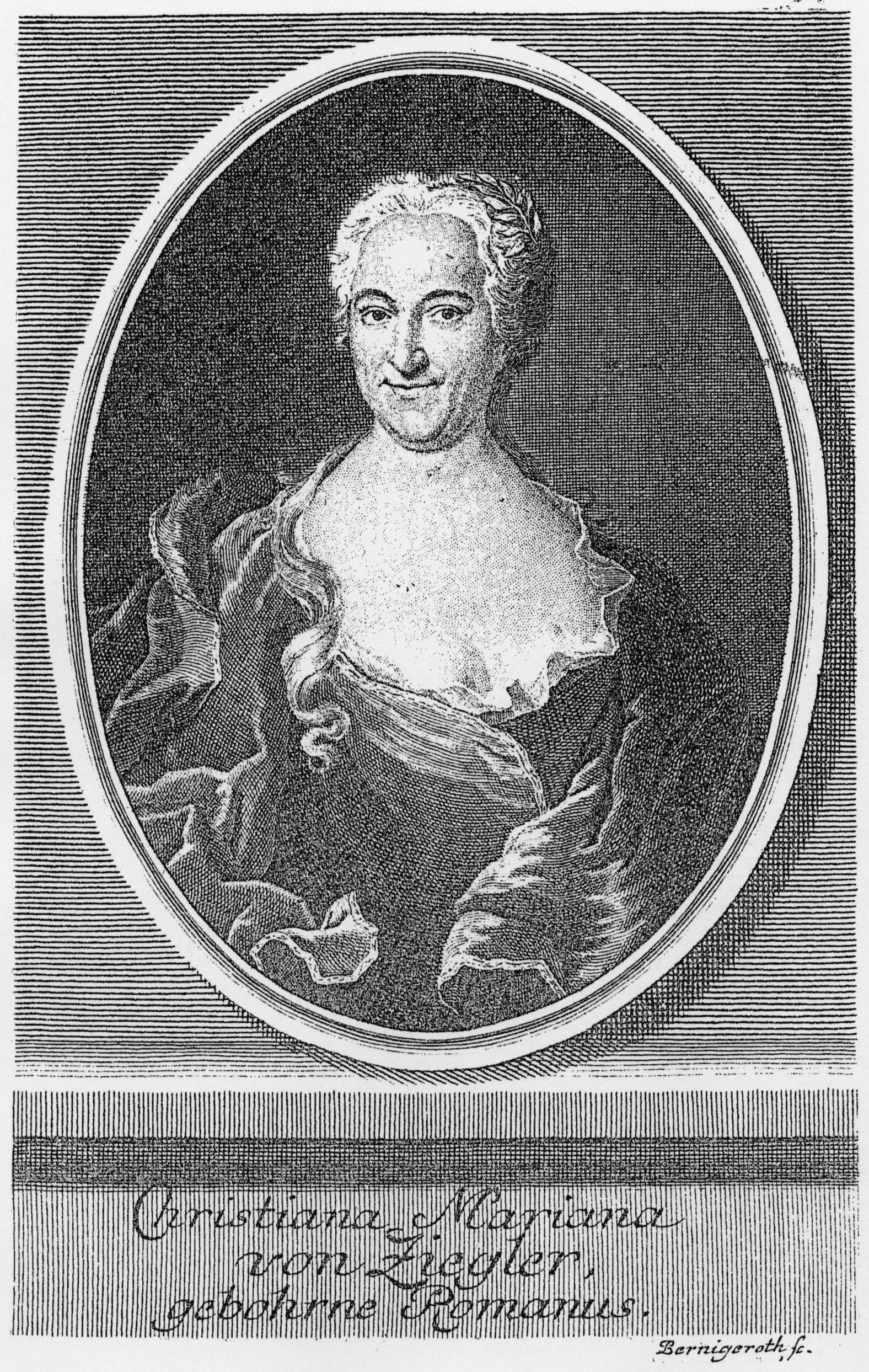
Christiana Mariana von Ziegler

Christiana Mariana von Ziegler (28 June 1695 – 1 May 1760) was a German poet and writer. She is best known for the texts of nine cantatas, which Johann Sebastian Bach composed after Easter in 1725.

== Biography ==
Christiana Mariana Romanus was born in Leipzig, where her father served as mayor in 1701. She began her literary career after the death of her second husband, Captain von Ziegler in 1722. She returned to Leipzig, where she lived in the family home, the Romanushaus, with her mother. Her father Franz Conrad Romanus (1671–1746) had received a long-term prison sentence for financial irregularities. Despite the difficult family circumstances, the house became a literary and musical salon. Johann Christoph Gottsched encouraged her poetic activity. She became the first woman member of Gottsched's literary society, the Deutsche Gesellschaft.

In 1741 she married for the third time and her literary activity ceased. She died on 1 May 1760 in Frankfurt an der Oder, Germany.

== Libretti ==
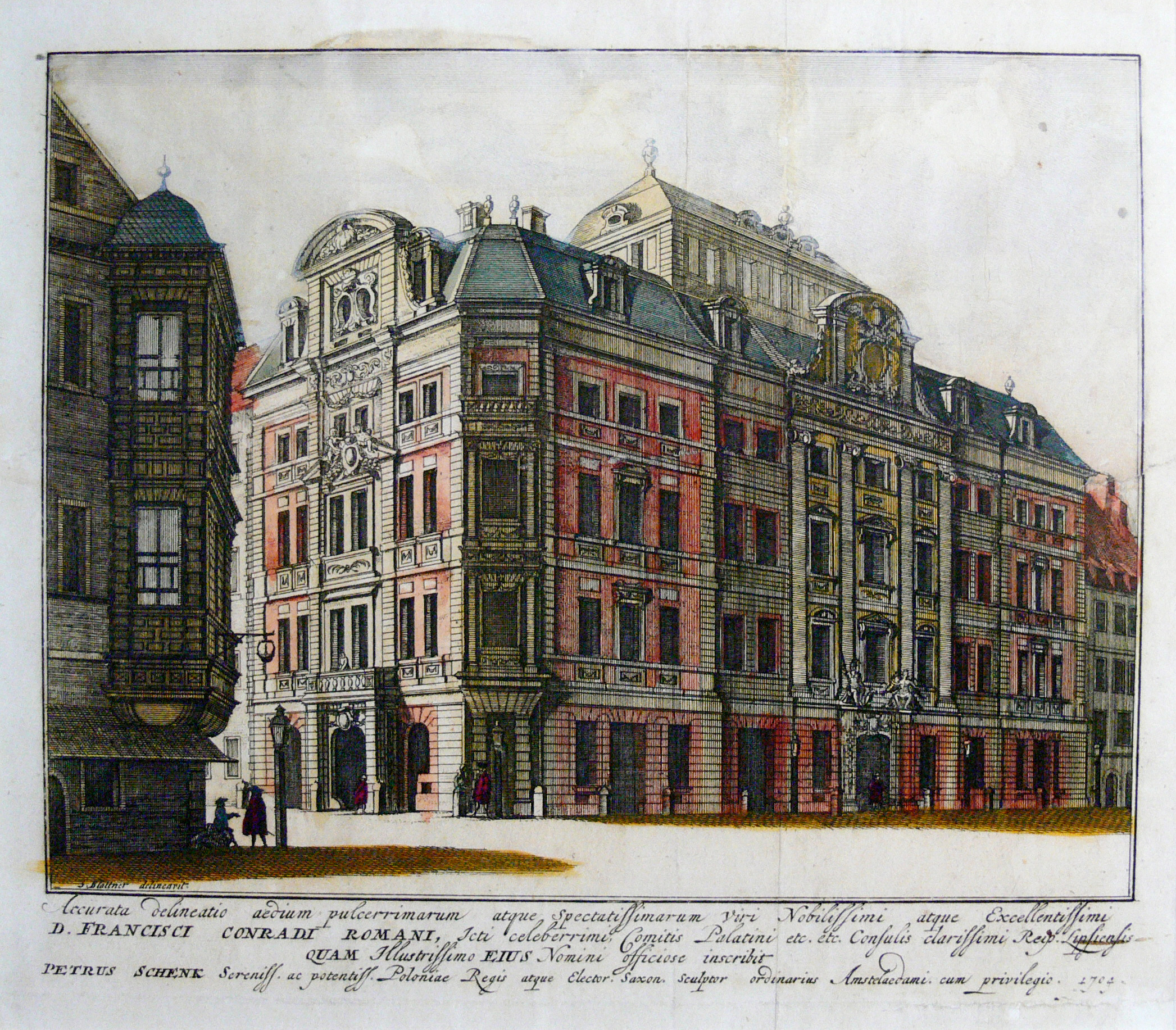
The Romanushaus, Brühl, Leipzig in 1704

Bach moved to Leipzig in 1723 to take up the post of Thomaskantor. In this role he set about composing a large number of cantatas for performance in the city's churches. There is some uncertainty about who was writing Bach's libretti in his first couple of years in Leipzig. Whoever his original librettist was, Bach appears to have been looking for a new librettist in 1724, and this may be when he met Ziegler. The nine cantatas set by Bach to texts by Ziegler are:

- Ihr werdet weinen und heulen, BWV 103, 22 April 1725
- Es ist euch gut, daß ich hingehe, BWV 108, 29 April 1725
- Bisher habt ihr nichts gebeten in meinem Namen, BWV 87, 6 May 1725
- Auf Christi Himmelfahrt allein, BWV 128, 10 May 1725
- Sie werden euch in den Bann tun, BWV 183, 13 May 1725
- Wer mich liebet, der wird mein Wort halten, BWV 74, 20 May 1725
- Also hat Gott die Welt geliebt, BWV 68, 21 May 1725
- Er rufet seinen Schafen mit Namen, BWV 175, 22 May 1725
- Es ist ein trotzig und verzagt Ding, BWV 176, 27 May 1725

The question arises why Bach turned to other librettists. There were still texts by Ziegler unset. She published a cycle of cantata texts in 1728, the texts set by Bach and others not set by him. John Eliot Gardiner suggests that the relationship between the two may have been strained by Bach's habit of amending her texts to suit his purposes. There also seem to be some examples of lack of communication when Bach sets Ziegler's words by adapting music he had composed earlier (as for example in Er rufet seinen Schafen mit Namen, BWV 175).

== Bibliography ==
- Vermischte Schriften in gebundener und ungebunder Rede [Miscellaneous writings in verse and prose] (1739)
