= Peter Hohmann, Edler of Hohenthal =

Peter Hohmann (26 July 1663, in Könnern – 2 January 1732, in Leipzig) was a merchant and town councillor in Leipzig. He was raised to the peerage and became the founder of the noble lineage Edler of Hohenthal.

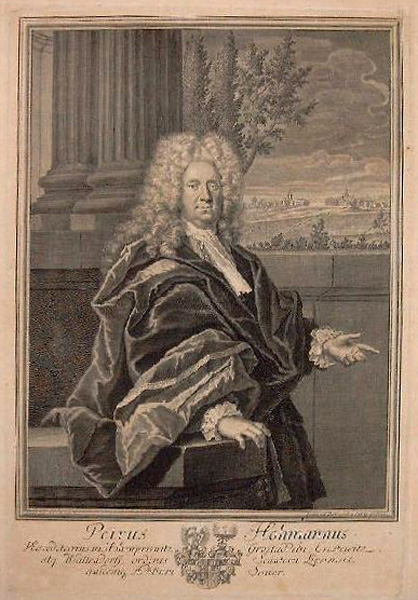
Peter Hohmann

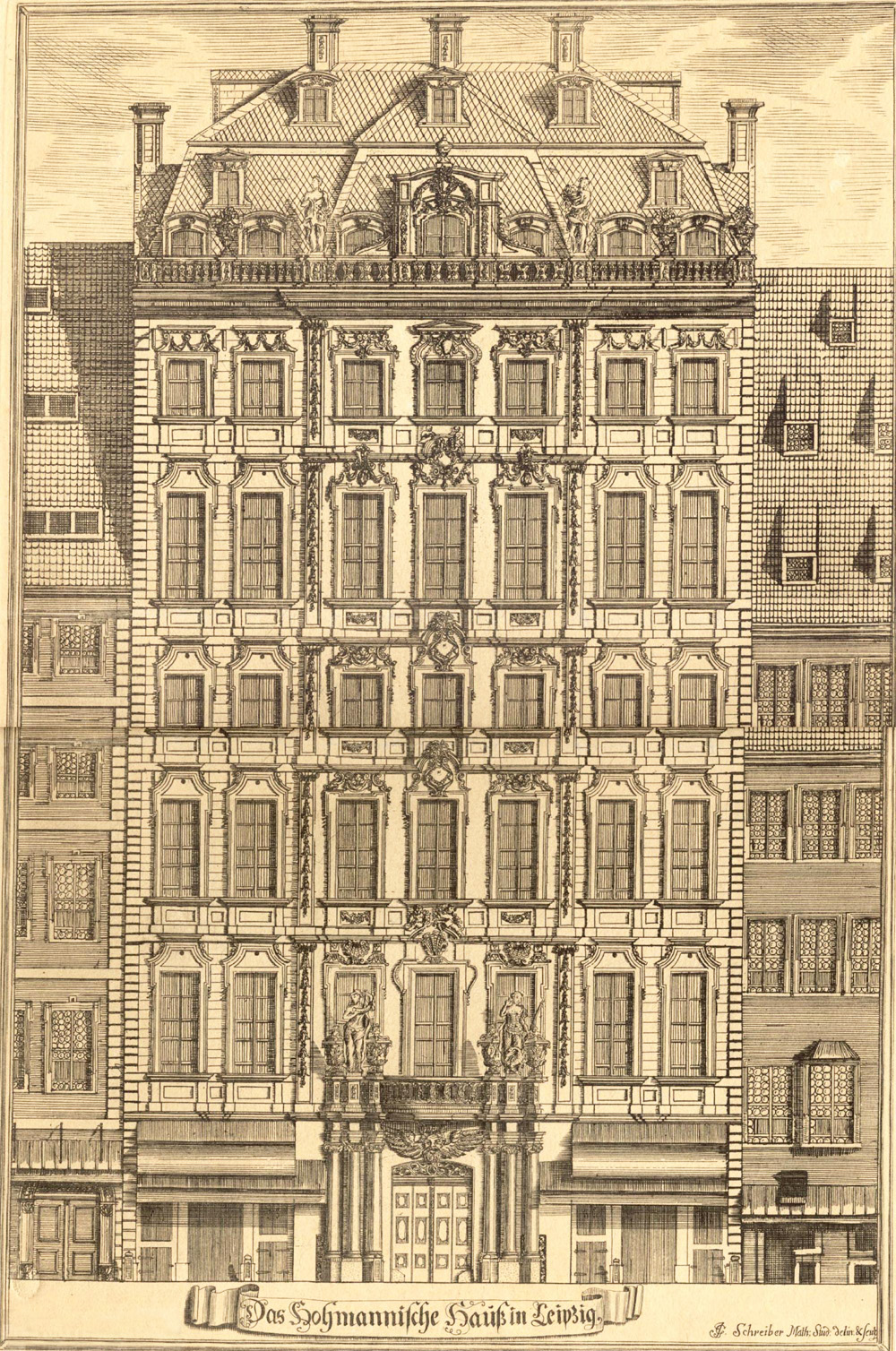
Peter Hohmann's house in the Katharinenstrasse in Leipzig, around 1720

== Life ==
Peter Hohmann was the son of a master craftsman in Könnern. At the age of 17 he went to Leipzig in order to start a merchant apprenticeship. He was servant in a business house which was dealing with banking, movement of goods, and merchandise traffic. Within a few years he became partner and soon after, sole proprietor.

In 1694 he acquired the rights of a burgher of Leipzig. He quickly became wealthy. Among his customers were the Imperial Army of Emperor Charles VI of Germany, which he supplied with equipment and foodstuffs. For his services, in 1717 in Vienna he was raised to the peerage and designated Edler of Hohenthal. He himself he did not make use of this title. However, he became the progenitor of the noble lineage Edler of Hohenthal.

In 1715 he became a town councillor and master builder to the council (German: Ratsbaumeister). Peter Hohmann Edler of Hohenthal was the owner of properties not only in Leipzig. He purchased numerous manor houses, among them those of Crostewitz, south of Leipzig; Großdeuben, now part of Böhlen; Großstädteln; Hohenprießnitz, now part of Zschepplin; Wallendorf on the Luppe; and (in 1709) Lichte (Wallendorf). Peter Hohmann was married to Gertrud Sabina, née Koch. They had six sons.

== Distinction ==
Leipzig honoured its former citizen in 1898 by naming the Hohmannstrasse in the Euteritzsch district after him.

== Sources ==
- Horst Riedel. Stadtlexikon Leipzig von A bis Z. PROLEIPZIG 2005, p. 247 (in German)
- André Loh-Kliesch. Leipzig-Lexikon (in German)
