= Es ist euch gut, daß ich hingehe, BWV 108 =

Church cantata by Johann Sebastian Bach

Es ist euch gut, daß ich hingehe
- BWV 108
- Church cantata by J. S. Bach
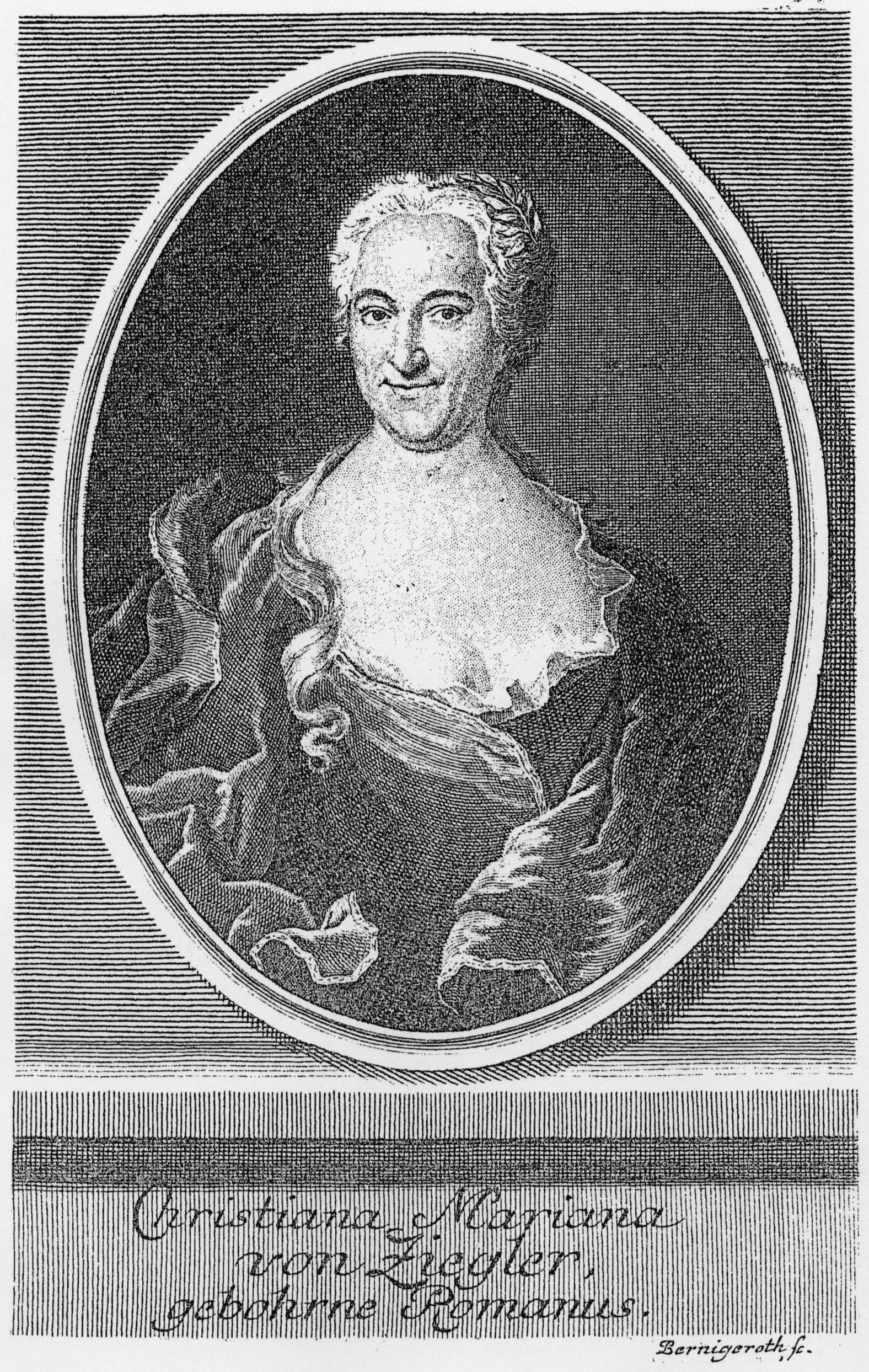
- Christiana Mariana von Ziegler, author of the cantata text
- Occasion: Cantate
- Cantata text: Christiana Mariana von Ziegler
- Bible text: John 16:7,13
- Chorale: by Paul Gerhardt
- Performed: 29 April 1725: Leipzig
- Movements: 6
- Vocal: solo: alto, tenor and bass; SATB choir
- Instrumental: 2 oboes d'amore; 2 violins; viola; bassoon; continuo

Es ist euch gut, daß ich hingehe (It is good for you that I leave), BWV 108, is a church cantata by Johann Sebastian Bach. He composed it in Leipzig for Cantate Sunday, the fourth Sunday after Easter, and first performed it on 29 April 1725.

It is the second of nine cantatas on texts by Christiana Mariana von Ziegler, with whom he collaborated at the end of his second cantata cycle. She used two quotations from the prescribed gospel from the Farewell Discourse and closed the cantata with a stanza from Paul Gerhardt's "Gott Vater, sende deinen Geist". The topic is the prediction of Jesus of his parting and the coming of the Spirit as a comforter. The first announcement is sung by the bass as the vox Christi, the second, in the centre of the work, by the choir in three fugues combined in motet style but unified by similar themes. Bach scored the cantata for three vocal soloists (alto, tenor and bass), a four-part choir, and a Baroque instrumental ensemble of two oboes d'amore, strings and continuo. He used elements of word-painting, such as very long notes to illustrate firm belief, and sigh motifs interrupted by rests to illustrate the desiring heart.

== History and words ==
Bach composed the cantata in his second year as Thomaskantor in Leipzig for the Fourth Sunday after Easter called Cantate. The prescribed readings for the Sunday were from the Epistle of James, "Every good gift comes from the Father of lights" (James 1:17–21), and from the Gospel of John, Jesus announcing the Comforter in his Farewell Discourse (John 16:5–15). In his second year Bach had composed chorale cantatas between the first Sunday after Trinity and Palm Sunday, but for Easter returned to cantatas on more varied texts, possibly because he lost his librettist.

Between Easter and Pentecost Bach's congregation heard a series of nine cantatas with texts by a new librettist, Christiana Mariana von Ziegler. As the average interval between the performances was less than a week (they were not only for Sundays; there were additional ones for Ascension Day and Pentecost), Bach may have been composed at a correspondingly intense rate, although it is not known when he began work on them. The first of the series was Ihr werdet weinen und heulen, BWV 103, followed a week later by Es ist euch gut, daß ich hingehe. It begins with a bass solo as the vox Christi delivering a quotation from the gospel (John 16:7); a second quotation appears in the fourth movement (John 16:13). The second and third movements deal with the hope for salvation; the fifth is a prayer for guidance until death. The poet used as the closing chorale the tenth stanza of Paul Gerhardt's hymn "Gott Vater, sende deinen Geist" (1653), expressing faith in God's guidance.

=== Publication ===
The cantata text was published in 1728 in Ziegler's first collection, Versuch in gebundener Schreibart. The version set by Bach was slightly different, as he shortened the text here as in other cantatas by the same librettist. The music survived in a holograph manuscript, but was not published until 1876 when the cantata appeared in the Bach Gesellschaft´s first complete edition of Bach's work.

== Music ==
=== Structure and scoring ===
Bach structured the cantata in six movements, beginning with a biblical quotation for the vox Christi, Jesus speaking. A set of aria and recitative is followed by a chorus on another biblical quotation from the gospel, while an aria leads to the closing chorale. Bach scored the work for three vocal soloists (alto (A), tenor (T) and bass (B)), a four-part choir, and a Baroque instrumental ensemble of two oboes d'amore (Oa), two violins (Vl), viola (Va) and basso continuo. The duration of the cantata is given as 20 minutes.

In the following table of the movements, the scoring follows the Neue Bach-Ausgabe. The keys and time signatures are taken from Alfred Dürr, using the symbol for common time (4/4). The continuo, playing throughout, is not shown.

Movements of Es ist euch gut, daß ich hingehe
No.	Title	Text	Type	Vocal	Oboe	Strings	Key	Time
1	Es ist euch gut, daß ich hingehe	John 16:7	Aria	B	Oa	2Vl Va	A major	common time
2	Mich kann kein Zweifel stören	anon.	Aria	T		Vl	F-sharp minor	common time
3	Dein Geist wird mich also regieren	anon.	Recitative	T				common time
4	Wenn aber jener, der Geist der Wahrheit kommen wird	John 16:13	Chorus	SATB	2Oa	2Vl Va	D major	common time
5	Was mein Herz von dir begehrt	anon.	Aria	A		2Vl Va	B minor	6/8
6	Dein Geist, den Gott von Himmel gibt	Gerhardt	Chorale	SATB	2Oa	2Vl Va	B minor	common time

=== Movements ===
The cantata presents similarities to the one Bach wrote the previous year for the same occasion, Wo gehest du hin? BWV 166.

==== 1 ====
The similarities begin with the first movement, which like that of the previous year's cantata, is given to the bass as the vox Christi. The movement is the quotation of verse 7 from the gospel, beginning: "Es ist euch gut, daß ich hingehe; denn so ich nicht hingehe, kömmt der Tröster nicht zu euch" (It is good for you that I leave; for if I did not go, the Comforter would not come to you). It is between aria and arioso. An oboe d'amore as the obbligato instrument plays extended melodies. Voice and oboe share the musical material, conveying "the mood of grieving at parting".

==== 2 ====
The following aria, "Mich kann kein Zweifel stören" (No doubt can disturb me), is dominated by a virtuoso solo violin. The words "Ich glaube" (I believe) are illustrated by very long notes in the voice, while an ostinato bass line renders "steadfastness" in a different way. The musicologist Julian Mincham notes that Bach uses the key F-sharp minor selectively, "often for slowish movements of great expressive force", for example for the alto aria Buß und Reu from his St Matthew Passion.

==== 3 ====
A short secco recitative expresses "Dein Geist wird mich also regieren, daß ich auf rechter Bahne geh" (Thus Your Spirit will guide me, so that I walk on the right path).

==== 4 ====
The next biblical quotation, verse 13 of the gospel, "Wenn aber jener, der Geist der Wahrheit, kommen wird, der wird euch in alle Wahrheit leiten" (But when that one, the Spirit of Truth, shall come, He shall lead you into all truth). is rendered by the choir. It is divided in three sections, similar to a da capo form. All three parts are fugues, combined in motet style, the instruments playing mostly colla parte with the voices. The second section begins "Denn er wird nicht von ihm selber reden" (For He will not speak of His own accord); the third section expresses "und was zukünftig ist, wird er verkündigen" (and what is to come, He will foretell), on a fugue subject similar to the first, giving the movement a "feeling of unity".

==== 5 ====
The last aria,"Was mein Herz von dir begehrt" (What my heart desires from You), is accompanied by the strings, dominated by the first violin. The word "Herz" (heart) is rendered in sighing motifs, intensified by following rests.

==== 6 ====
The closing chorale, "Dein Geist, den Gott vom Himmel gibt, der leitet alles, was ihn liebt" (Your Spirit, which God sends from heaven, leads everything that loves Him), is a four-part setting on the melody of "Kommt her zu mir, spricht Gottes Sohn". The bass line is pacing forward constantly.

== Recordings ==
The selection is taken from the listing on the Bach Cantatas website. Vocal ensembles with one voice per part (OVPP) and instrumental groups playing period instruments in historically informed performances are marked green.

Recordings of Es ist euch gut, daß ich hingehe
Title	Conductor / Choir / Orchestra	Soloists	Label	Year	Choir type	Instr.
The RIAS Bach Cantatas Project (1949–1952)	Karl Ristenpart RIAS Kammerchor RIAS Kammerorchester	Ingrid Lorenzen; Helmut Krebs; Dietrich Fischer-Dieskau	Audite	1950		
Bach Cantatas BWV 67, 108 & 127	Karl Richter Münchener Bach-Chor Bayerisches Staatsorchester	Lilian Benningsen; Peter Pears; Kieth Engen	Archiv Produktion	1958		
J. S. Bach: Das Kantatenwerk • Complete Cantatas • Les Cantates, Folge / Vol. 6	Nikolaus Harnoncourt Tölzer Knabenchor Concentus Musicus Wien	Paul Esswood; Kurt Equiluz; Ruud van der Meer	Teldec	1979		Period
Die Bach Kantate Vol. 33	Helmuth Rilling Gächinger Kantorei Bach-Collegium Stuttgart	Carolyn Watkinson; Peter Schreier; Philippe Huttenlocher	Hänssler	1981		
Bach Edition Vol. 15 – Cantatas Vol. 8	Pieter Jan Leusink Holland Boys Choir Netherlands Bach Collegium	Sytse Buwalda; Marcel Beekman; Bas Ramselaar	Brilliant Classics	2000		Period
Bach Cantatas Vol. 24: Altenburg/Warwick / For the 3rd Sunday after Easter (Jubilate) / For the 4th Sunday after Easter (Cantate)	John Eliot Gardiner Monteverdi Choir English Baroque Soloists	Robin Tyson; James Gilchrist; Stephen Varcoe	Soli Deo Gloria	2000		Period
J. S. Bach: Complete Cantatas Vol. 15	Ton Koopman Amsterdam Baroque Orchestra & Choir	Bogna Bartosz; Jörg Dürmüller; Klaus Mertens	Antoine Marchand	2001		Period
J. S. Bach: Cantatas Vol. 36 – (Cantatas from Leipzig 1725) – BWV 6, 42, 103, 108	Masaaki Suzuki Bach Collegium Japan	Robin Blaze; James Gilchrist; Dominik Wörner	BIS	2006		Period
J. S. Bach: Cantatas for the Complete Liturgical Year Vol. 10 – "Himmelfahrts-Oratorium " – Cantatas BWV 108 · 86 · 11 · 44	Sigiswald Kuijken La Petite Bande	Siri Thornhill; Petra Noskaiová; Christoph Genz; Jan van der Crabben	Accent	2008	OVPP	Period
