= Bisher habt ihr nichts gebeten in meinem Namen, BWV 87 =

Church cantata by Johann Sebastian Bach

Bisher habt ihr nichts gebeten in meinem Namen
- BWV 87
- Church cantata by J. S. Bach
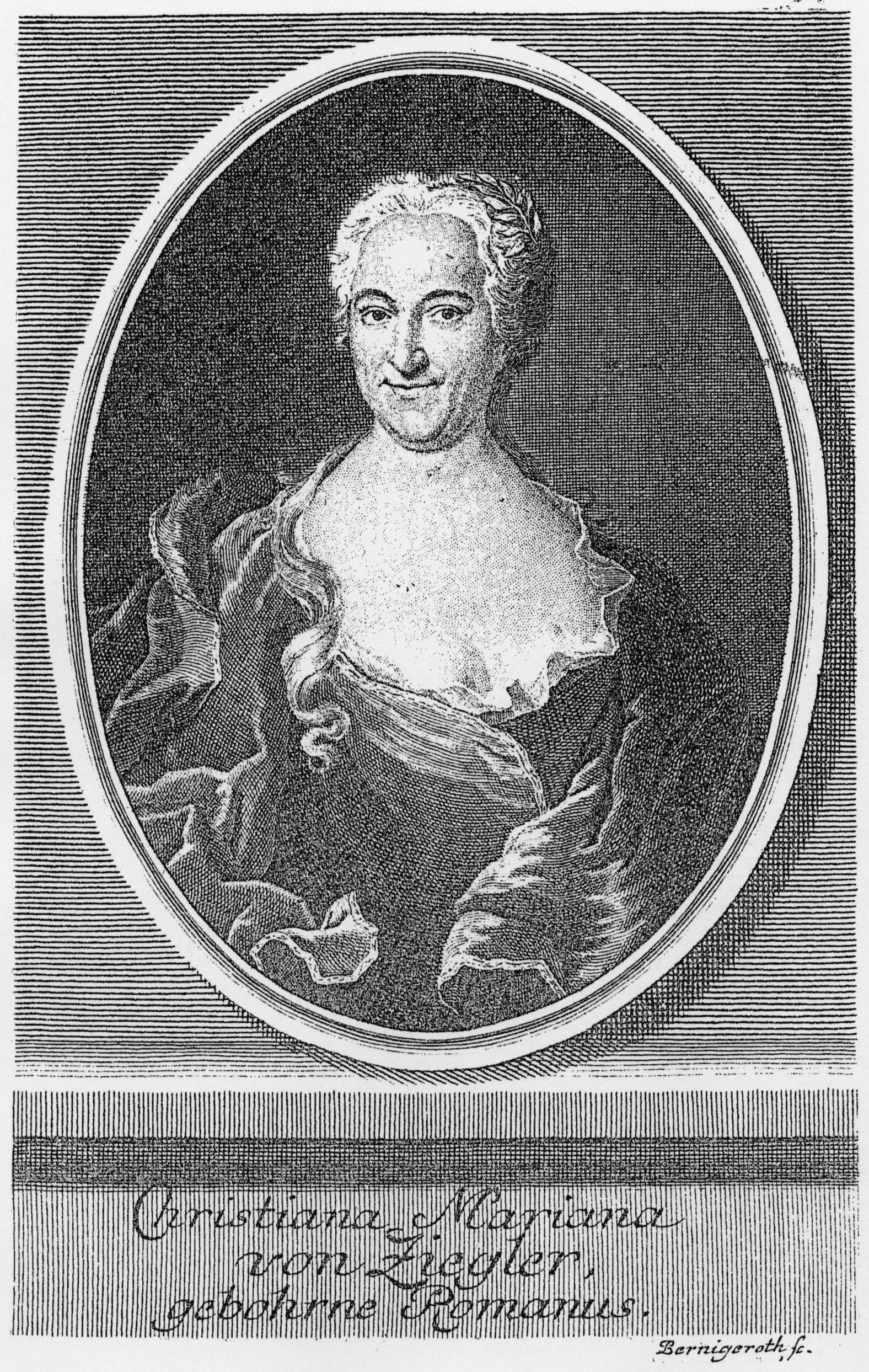
- Christiana Mariana von Ziegler, author of the cantata text
- Occasion: Rogate (fifth Sunday after Easter)
- Cantata text: Christiana Mariana von Ziegler
- Bible text: John 16:24
- Chorale: by Heinrich Müller
- Performed: 6 May 1725: Leipzig
- Movements: 7
- Vocal: solo: alto, tenor and bass; SATB choir
- Instrumental: 2 oboes; 2 oboes da caccia; 2 violins; viola; continuo

Bisher habt ihr nichts gebeten in meinem Namen (Until now you have asked for nothing in My name), BWV 87, (Note: "BWV" is Bach-Werke-Verzeichnis, a thematic catalogue of Bach's works.) is a church cantata by Johann Sebastian Bach. He composed it in Leipzig for Rogate, the fifth Sunday after Easter, and first performed it on 6 May 1725.

It is the third of nine cantatas on texts by Christiana Mariana von Ziegler, with whom Bach collaborated at the end of his second cantata cycle. She used a quotation from the prescribed gospel from the Farewell Discourse and closed the cantata with a stanza the ninth stanza of Heinrich Müller's 1659 hymn "Selig ist die Seele". Its theme is man in the world depicted as a place of tribulation, in need of forgiveness, but with hope to overcome in prayer and love. Bach scored the cantata for three vocal soloists (alto, tenor and bass), a four-part choir only for the closing chorale, and a Baroque instrumental ensemble of two oboes, two oboes da caccia, strings and continuo.

== History and words ==
Bach composed the cantata in Leipzig in his second annual cycle for the Fifth Sunday after Easter, called Rogate. The prescribed readings for the Sunday were from the Epistle of James, "doers of the word, not only listeners" (James 1:22–27) and from the Gospel of John, from the Farewell Discourse of Jesus, "prayers will be fulfilled" (John 16:23–30). In his second year Bach had composed chorale cantatas between the first Sunday after Trinity and Palm Sunday, but for Easter returned to cantatas on more varied texts, possibly because he lost his librettist. The cantata is the third of nine for the period between Easter and Pentecost based on texts of Christiana Mariana von Ziegler. Her cantatas for the period deal with "the understanding of Jesus' suffering within the context of victory and love, increasingly articulating how the tribulation of the world is overcome", according to American musicologist Eric Chafe. Hans-Joachim Schulze describes her poetry as wordy and "rather unskillful". Ziegler published her text in 1728 in the collection Versuch in gebundener Schreib-Art.

The text begins, as do several others of the period, with a bass solo as the vox Christi delivers a quotation from verse 24 of the Gospel, conveying a "reproach to believers", referencing Ziegler's original text, which Schulze notes had received streamlining by Bach. The final lines from the third movement, an aria, paraphrase an additional Gospel verse. One recitative is not part of the printed publication. Alfred Dürr assumes that Bach wrote it himself to improve the connection to the following Gospel quotation in the fifth movement. The ninth stanza of Heinrich Müller's hymn "Selig ist die Seele" (1659) is used as the closing chorale.

Bach led the Thomanerchor in the first performance on 6 May 1725.

== Music ==
=== Structure and scoring ===
Bach structured the cantata in seven movements, beginning with a biblical quotation for the vox Christi, Jesus speaking. A sequence of recitative, aria, recitative is followed by another biblical quotation of a verse spoken by Jesus. It is followed by an aria and the closing chorale. Bach scored the work for three vocal soloists (alto (A), tenor (T) and bass (B)), a four-part choir only for the closing chorale, and a Baroque instrumental ensemble of two oboes (Ob), two oboes da caccia (Oc), two violins (Vl), viola (Va) and basso continuo.

In the following table of the movements, the scoring follows the Neue Bach-Ausgabe. The keys and time signatures are taken from Dürr's standard work Die Kantaten von Johann Sebastian Bach, using the symbol for common time (4/4). The continuo, playing throughout, is not shown.

Movements of Bisher habt ihr nichts gebeten in meinem Namen
| No. | Title | Text | Type | Vocal | Oboe | Strings | Key | Time |
|---|---|---|---|---|---|---|---|---|
| 1 | Bisher habt ihr nichts gebeten in meinem Namen | John 16:24 | (Arioso) | B | 2Ob Oc | 2Vl Va | D minor | common time |
| 2 | O Wort, das Geist und Seel erschreckt | Ziegler | Recitative | A | | | | common time |
| 3 | Dein Geist wird mich also regieren | Ziegler | Aria | A | 2Oc | | G minor | common time |
| 4 | Wenn unsre Schuld bis an den Himmel steigt | Ziegler | Recitative | T | | 2Vl Va | | common time |
| 5 | In der Welt habt ihr Angst | John 16:33 | (Arioso) | B | | | | common time |
| 6 | Ich will leiden, ich will schweigen | Ziegler | Aria | T | | 2Vl Va | B-flat major | 12/8 |
| 7 | Muß ich sein betrübet? | Müller | Chorale | SATB | Ob Oc | 2Vl Va | D minor | common time |

=== Movements ===
==== 1 ====
Similar to the cantata for the same occasion in Bach's first year in Leipzig, Wahrlich, wahrlich, ich sage euch, BWV 86, the text begins with words of Jesus from the gospel, sung by the bass as the vox Christi: "Bisher habt ihr nichts gebeten in meinem Namen" (Until now you have asked for nothing in my name). It is accompanied by the strings, doubled by the oboes. The movement is titled Aria in some of the parts, but is formally free. It resembles a fugue because the instruments enter in imitation, and the voice sings a similar theme. Christoph Wolff notes that the "voice is supported by an elaborate polyphonic orchestral texture". John Eliot Gardiner, who conducted the Bach Cantata Pilgrimage in 2000, notes that the reaction to "man's reprehensible neglect" of Jesus's promise is expressed with "stern, declamatory energy".

==== 2 ====
A recitative for alto, "O Wort, das Geist und Seel erschreckt" (O word that terrifies spirit and soul), expresses the fear caused by failure.

==== 3 ====
An alto aria with two obbligato oboes da caccia is a prayer for forgiveness: "Vergib, o Vater, unsre Schuld" (Forgive, o Father, our guilt). The repentance is illustrated by sighing motifs. Gardiner notes a "mood of sustained reverence and penitence" and sees that in repeated slurred duplets illustrate "vergib", while ascending arpeggios in the continuo sometimes sound at the same time. The urgency of the prayer is intensified in the middle section by a continuo line in seven chromatic steps.

==== 4 ====
The second recitative is for tenor intensified by accompanying strings. It begins "Wenn unsre Schuld bis an den Himmel steigt" (When our guilt climbs up all the way to heaven). and ends in an arioso on the words "Drum suche mich zu trösten" (therefore seek to comfort me). Dürr speculated that this recitative, which is not part of Ziegler's text but inserted by Bach himself, for a less abrupt turn of the mood.

==== 5 ====
In the fifth movement, the bass renders another word of Jesus from the Gospel, "In der Welt habt ihr Angst; aber seid getrost, ich habe die Welt überwunden" (In the world you have fear; however be comforted, I have conquered the world). This music is marked Basso solo in the score, but the melody lines are closer to an aria than in the first movement. The music is serious, with the voice only accompanied by the continuo, referring to the Passion as the price for the "comfort". Wolff notes the "almost hymn-like emphasis through measured, arioso declamation ... In the central fifth movement Bach reduces the accompaniment to the continuo, another means of underscoring the importance of Jesus’ words." Schulze interprets the accompaniment by the continuo alone as "a symbolic expression of the avoidance of everything earthly". The continuo plays motif like an ostinato, repeated at the end in a short da capo.

==== 6 ====
In response, the last aria expresses joy in suffering: "Ich will leiden, ich will schweigen, Jesus wird mir Hilf erzeigen" (I will suffer, I will be silent, Jesus will show me help). Its pastoral mood, created by dotted rhythm in 12/8 time, has been compared to the Sinfonia beginning Part II of Bach's Christmas Oratorio. Gardiner describes the mood as tender and lyrical but "spiced with momentary dissonance" when suffering, pain and despair are expressed.

==== 7 ====
The closing chorale, "Muß ich sein betrübet?" (Must I be troubled?), on the melody of "Jesu, meine Freude" by Johann Crüger is set in four parts. The pietistic text mentions "pain being sweeter than honey", and the music in D minor stands for "the necessary simultaneity in the world of suffering and of the divine love that ultimately overcomes it", according to Chafe. In the end, chromatic passages modulate to D major. The melody is well-known from Bach's motet Jesu, meine Freude with its several chorale settings.

== Manuscripts and publication ==
Both the autograph score and the set of parts that Bach used ared extant. The cantata was first published in 1872 in the first complete edition of Bach's work, the Bach-Gesellschaft Ausgabe. The volume in which the cantata appeared was edited by Wilhelm Rust. In 1960, the cantata was published in the Neue Bach-Ausgabe, the second complete edition of Bach's works, where it was edited by Dürr.

== Recordings ==
The selection is taken from the listing on the Bach Cantatas website. Instrumental groups playing period instruments in historically informed performances are marked green.

Recordings of Bisher habt ihr nichts gebeten in meinem Namen, BWV 87
| Title | Conductor / Choir / Orchestra | Soloists | Label | Year | Instr. |
|---|---|---|---|---|---|
| Les Grandes Cantates de J. S. Bach Vol. 5 | Fritz Werner Heinrich-Schütz-Chor Heilbronn Pforzheim Chamber Orchestra | Hertha Töpper; Helmut Krebs; Franz Kelch | Erato | 1959 | |
| Bach Cantatas Vol. 2 – Easter | Karl Richter Münchener Bach-Chor Münchener Bach-Orchester | Anna Reynolds; Peter Schreier; Dietrich Fischer-Dieskau | Archiv Produktion | 1974 | |
| J. S. Bach: Das Kantatenwerk • Complete Cantatas • Les Cantates, Folge / Vol. 22 | Nikolaus Harnoncourt Tölzer Knabenchor Concentus Musicus Wien | Paul Esswood; Kurt Equiluz; Ruud van der Meer | Teldec | 1977 | Period |
| Die Bach Kantate Vol. 34 | Helmuth Rilling Gächinger Kantorei Bach-Collegium Stuttgart | Julia Hamari; Aldo Baldin; Walter Heldwein | Hänssler | 1981 | |
| Bach Edition Vol. 8 – Cantatas Vol. 3 | Pieter Jan Leusink Holland Boys Choir Netherlands Bach Collegium | Sytse Buwalda; Nico van der Meel; Bas Ramselaar | Brilliant Classics | 1999 | Period |
| Bach Cantatas Vol. 25: Altenburg/Warwick / Dresden/Sherborne / For the 5th Sunday after Easter (Rogate) | John Eliot Gardiner Monteverdi Choir English Baroque Soloists | Robin Tyson; Steve Davisilim; Stephan Loges | Soli Deo Gloria | 2000 | Period |
| J. S. Bach: Complete Cantatas Vol. 15 | Ton Koopman Amsterdam Baroque Orchestra & Choir | Bogna Bartosz; Jörg Dürmüller; Klaus Mertens | Antoine Marchand | 2000 | Period |
| J. S. Bach: Cantatas Vol. 35 | Masaaki Suzuki Bach Collegium Japan | Robin Blaze; Makoto Sakurada; Peter Kooy | BIS | 2006 | Period |
