= Er rufet seinen Schafen mit Namen, BWV 175 =

Church cantata by Johann Sebastian Bach

Er rufet seinen Schafen mit Namen
- BWV 175
- Church cantata by J. S. Bach
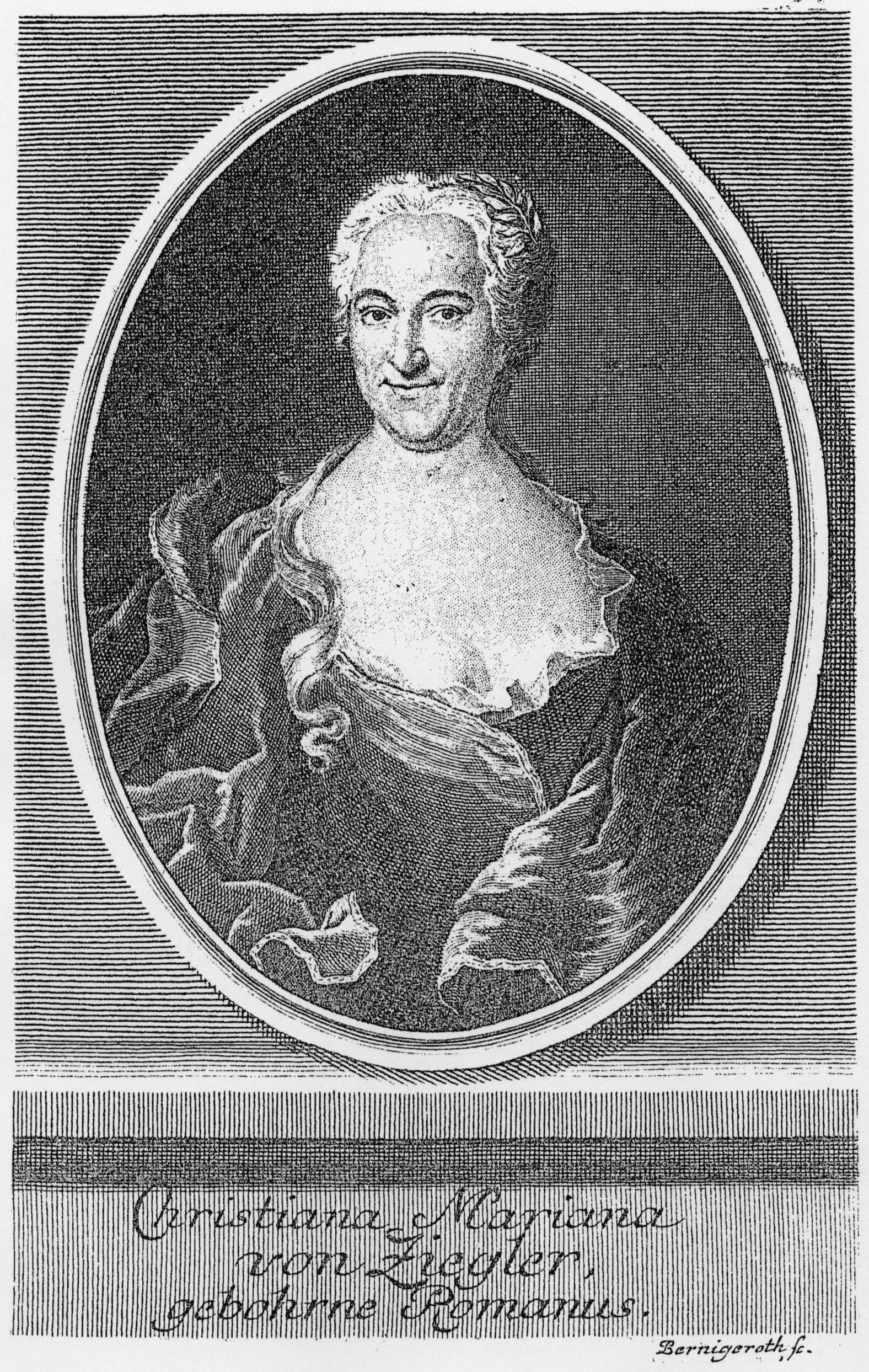
- Christiana Mariana von Ziegler, author of the cantata text
- Occasion: Pentecost Tuesday
- Cantata text: Christiana Mariana von Ziegler
- Bible text: John 10:3,6
- Chorale: by Johann Rist
- Performed: 22 May 1725: Leipzig
- Movements: 7
- Vocal: SATB choir; solo: alto, tenor and bass
- Instrumental: 2 trumpets; 3 recorders; 2 violins; viola; violoncello piccolo; continuo

Er rufet seinen Schafen mit Namen (He calls His sheep by name), BWV 175, is a church cantata by Johann Sebastian Bach. He composed the cantata in Leipzig for the third day of Pentecost and first performed it on 22 May 1725.

== History and words ==
Bach wrote the cantata in his second year in Leipzig for Pentecost Tuesday, the third day of Pentecost. In this second year Bach had composed chorale cantatas between the first Sunday after Trinity and Palm Sunday, but for Easter returned to cantatas on more varied texts, possibly because he lost his librettist. Nine of his cantatas for the period between Easter and Pentecost are based on texts of Christiana Mariana von Ziegler. Bach later assigned most of them, including this cantata, to his third annual cycle.

The prescribed readings for the feast day were from the Acts of the Apostles, the Holy Spirit in Samaria (Acts 8:14–17), and from the Gospel of John, the Good Shepherd (John 10:1–10). The cantata is thematically divided in two parts, movements 1 to 4 and movements 5 to 7, but performed consecutively. Both begin with a quotation from the gospel. The first part deals with Jesus as the Good Shepherd and the sheep who hear his voice. The second part deals with those who don't hear this voice. The poet uses the term "verblendete Vernunft" (deluded reason), possibly addressing the attitude of the intellectual movement "Aufklärung" (Age of Enlightenment). The cantata is closed with the ninth stanza of Johann Rist's hymn "O Gottes Geist, mein Trost und Ruh".

Bach first performed the cantata on 22 May 1725.

== Scoring and structure ==
The cantata in seven movements is distinctively scored for three vocal soloists (alto, tenor and bass), a four-part choir only in the closing chorale, two trumpets, three recorders, two violins, viola, violoncello piccolo and basso continuo. The recorders give a pastorale character to the first part about the Good Shepherd.

1. Recitative (tenor): Er rufet seinen Schafen mit Namen
2. Aria (alto): Komm, leite mich
3. Recitative (tenor): Wo find ich dich?
4. Aria (tenor): Es dünket mich, ich seh dich kommen
5. Recitative (alto, bass): Sie vernahmen aber nicht
6. Aria (bass): Öffnet euch, ihr beiden Ohren
7. Chorale: Nun, werter Geist, ich folg dir

== Music ==
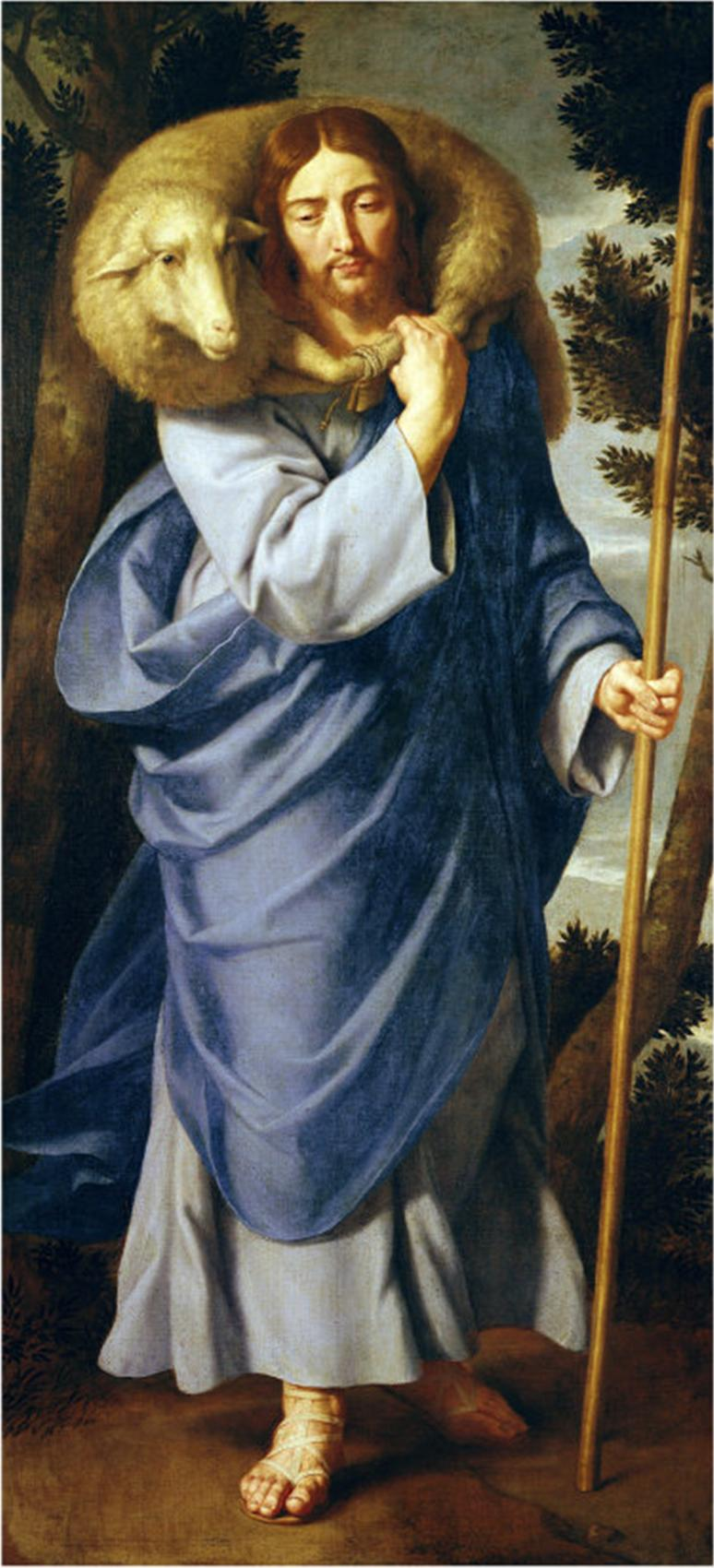
The Good Shepherd, by Jean-Baptiste de Champaigne

The first quotation from the Bible is sung by the tenor, like an Evangelist. This recitative, saying "Er rufet seinen Schafen mit Namen und führet sie hinaus" (He calls His sheep by name and leads them out), is accompanied by three recorders, an instrument with pastoral associations. The recorders also colour the first aria, a movement in 12/8 time with a text which refers to green fields.

The following short recitative asks in a dissonant and dramatic way, like a lost sheep for its shepherd: "Wo find ich dich? Ach, wo bist du verborgen?" (Where can I find you? Ah, where are you hidden?). The second aria is about the shepherd's arrival. Bach took the music from the secular cantata Durchlauchtster Leopold, BWV 173a, although the meter of Ziegler's poetry does not fit, as if Bach had not communicated the idea of the parody with the poet. Bach transposes movement 7 from his congratulatory cantata up a minor third for tenor rather than bass voice and with an obbligato part for violoncello piccolo contrasting with the low range of the instruments he used in the first version. It is in the form of an extended da capo bourrée.

The central recitative, movement 5, is the first movement of the cantata accompanied by the strings. It begins with the quotation from the gospel "Sie vernahmen aber nicht, was es war, das er zu ihnen gesaget hatte" (But they did not grasp what it was, that He had said to them), sung by the alto as the Evangelist, and leads to an arioso on the final warning not to overhear the words of Jesus, which "may be to your well-being" (zu deinem Heil geschicht). This warning is enforced by two trumpets in the bass aria which reminds of the death of Jesus: "Jesus hat euch zugeschworen, daß er Teufel, Tod erlegt" (Jesus has sworn to you that He has laid low devil, death). The trumpets are silent in the middle section, dealing with the gifts of Jesus, "grace, sufficiency, abundant life" (Gnade, Gnüge, volles Leben). The aria may also be a parody, but the model is not known.

The chorale is repeated from the cantata for Pentecost, Wer mich liebet, der wird mein Wort halten, BWV 59. The melody of the hymn for Pentecost "Komm, Heiliger Geist, Herre Gott" is set for four parts and three independent recorder parts, instead of strings in the earlier version, thus returning to the scoring of the beginning of the cantata.

== Recordings ==
- J. S. Bach: Cantatas BWV 100 & BWV 175, Heinz Wunderlich, Kantorei St. Jacobi Hamburg, Hamburger Kammerorchester, Lotte Wolf-Matthäus, Hans-Joachim Rotzsch, Hans-Olaf Hudemann, Cantate 1961
- Bach Cantatas Vol. 3 – Ascension Day, Whitsun, Trinity, Karl Richter, Münchener Bach-Chor, Münchener Bach-Orchester, Anna Reynolds, Peter Schreier, Dietrich Fischer-Dieskau, Cantate 1975
- Die Bach Kantate Vol. 38, Helmuth Rilling, Gächinger Kantorei, Bach-Collegium Stuttgart, Carolyn Watkinson, Peter Schreier, Philippe Huttenlocher, Hänssler 1981
- J. S. Bach: Das Kantatenwerk – Sacred Cantatas (Vol. 9), Gustav Leonhardt, Knabenchor Hannover, Collegium Vocale Gent, Leonhardt-Consort, Paul Esswood, Marius van Altena, Max van Egmond, Teldec 1988
- J. S. Bach: Cantatas with Violoncelle Piccolo (Vol. 2), Christophe Coin, Das Leipziger Concerto Vocale, Ensemble Baroque de Limoges, Barbara Schlick, Andreas Scholl, Christoph Prégardien, Gotthold Schwarz, Auvidis Astrée 1994
- Bach Cantatas Vol. 27: Blythburgh/Kirkwell, John Eliot Gardiner, Monteverdi Choir, English Baroque Soloists, Nathalie Stutzmann, Christoph Genz, Stephan Loges, Soli Deo Gloria 2000
- J. S. Bach: Complete Cantatas Vol. 15, Ton Koopman, Amsterdam Baroque Orchestra & Choir, Bogna Bartosz, Christoph Prégardien, Klaus Mertens, Antoine Marchand 2001
- J. S. Bach: Cantatas Vol. 39 (Cantatas from Leipzig 1725), Masaaki Suzuki, Bach Collegium Japan, Robin Blaze, Gerd Türk, Peter Kooy, BIS 2007

== Sources ==
- Er rufet seinen Schafen mit Namen, BWV 175: Scores at the International Music Score Library Project
- Er rufet seinen Schafen mit Namen BWV 175; BC A 89 / Sacred cantata (3rd Day of Pentecost) Bach Digital
- Cantata BWV 175 Er rufet seinen Schafen mit Namen history, scoring, sources for text and music, translations to various languages, discography, discussion, Bach Cantatas Website
- Er rufet seinen Schafen mit Namen history, scoring, Bach website (in German)
- BWV 175 Er rufet seinen Schafen mit Namen English translation, University of Vermont
- BWV 175 Er rufet seinen Schafen mit Namen text, scoring, University of Alberta
