= Katharinenstrasse =

Street in Leipzig, Germany

Coordinates: 51.34219°N 12.374955°E

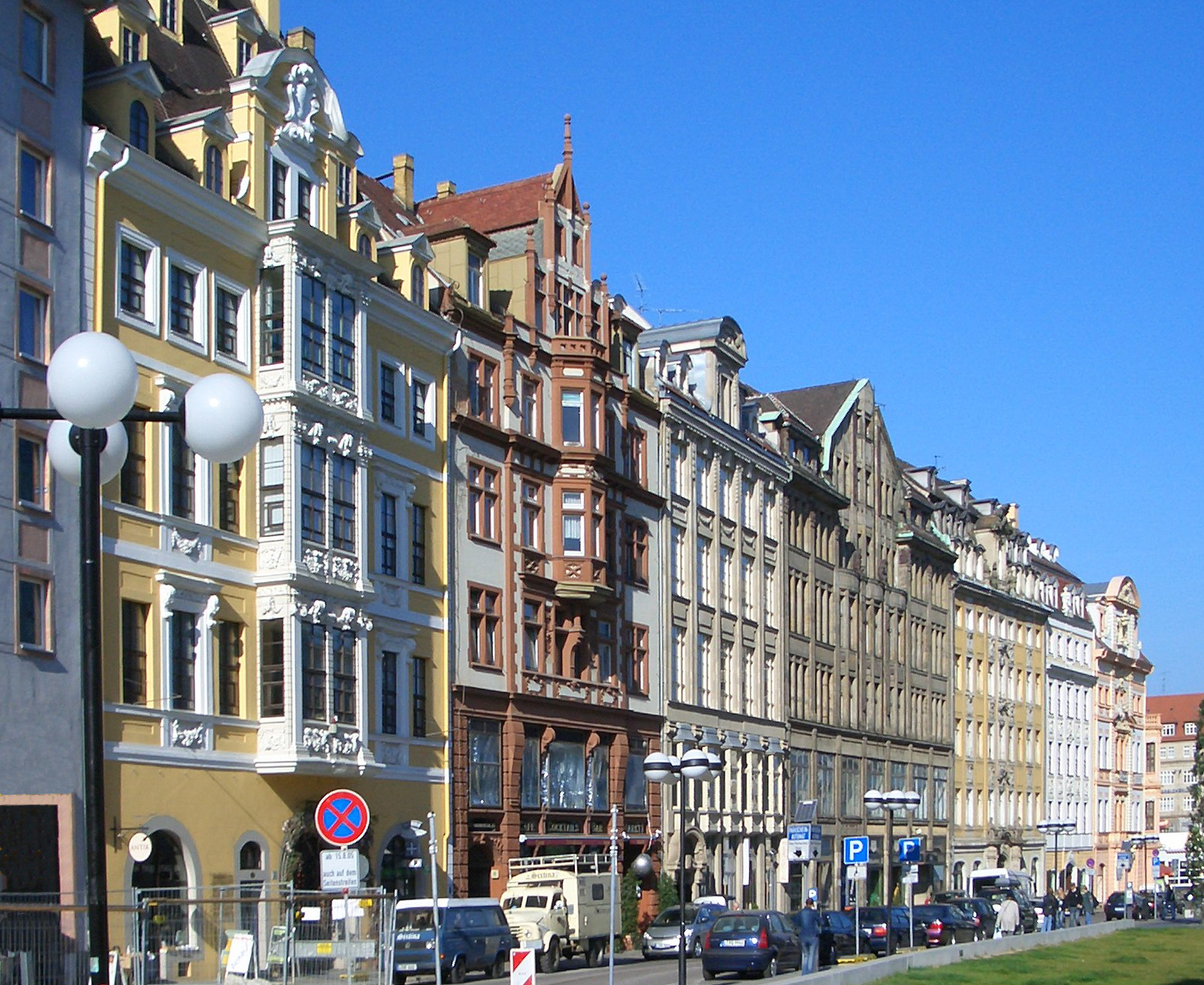
- West side of Katharinenstrasse (2005)
- Interactive map of Katharinenstrasse
- Former name: Catherstraße
- Length: 199 m (653 ft)
- Location: Leipzig-Mitte, Leipzig, Germany
- Postal code: 04109
- Nearest metro station: Leipzig Markt station of S-Bahn Mitteldeutschland in the south and the tram interchange station Goerdelerring in the north
- North end: Brühl
- Major junctions: Böttchergäßchen, Sachsenplatz (1969 to 2002)
- South end: Markt

Katharinenstrasse (in English: Catherine Street) is a street in the north of the central quarter inside the Inner City Ring Road of Leipzig, Germany. It runs slightly curved in a north–south direction between Markt and Brühl. Its length is 199 m (652.9 ft). The name goes back to a former chapel at the northern end of the street, which was mentioned in 1240. The point de vue to the south is the tower of the Old Town Hall.

== History ==
Katharinenstrasse was probably built in the 11th century and served, among other things, to connect the market to the Via regia that ran through the Brühl. On the right side of the confluence with the Brühl, the St. Catherine's Chapel was consecrated in 1233 but was demolished after the Reformation in 1546. Katharinenstrasse kept its name, sometimes changed to Catherstrasse. On the site of the chapel, a magnificent residential and commercial building was built in which the mayor, Hieronymus Lotter (1497–1580) lived.

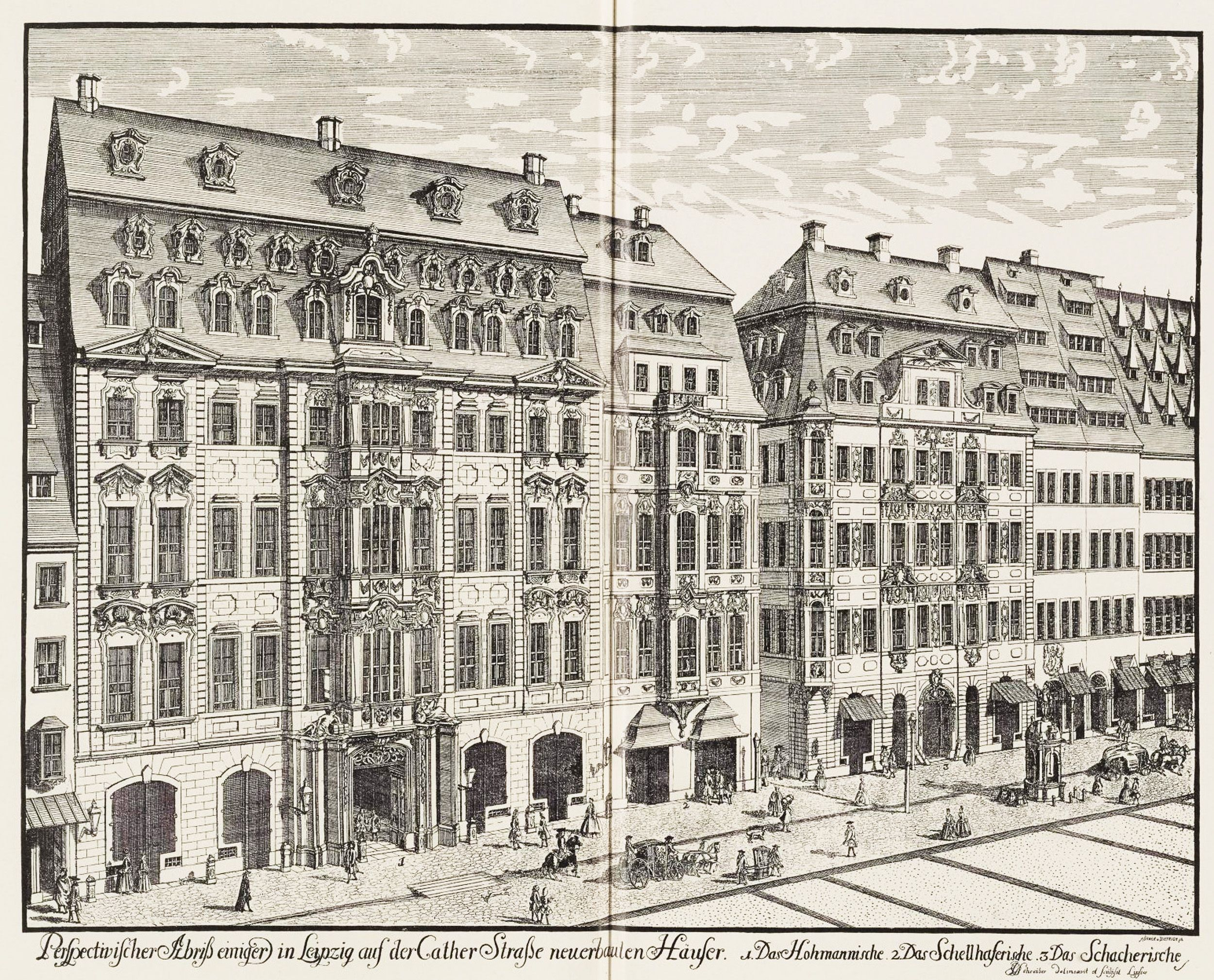
Hohmann, Schellhafer and Schacher's house on the east side of Katharinenstrasse (around 1720)

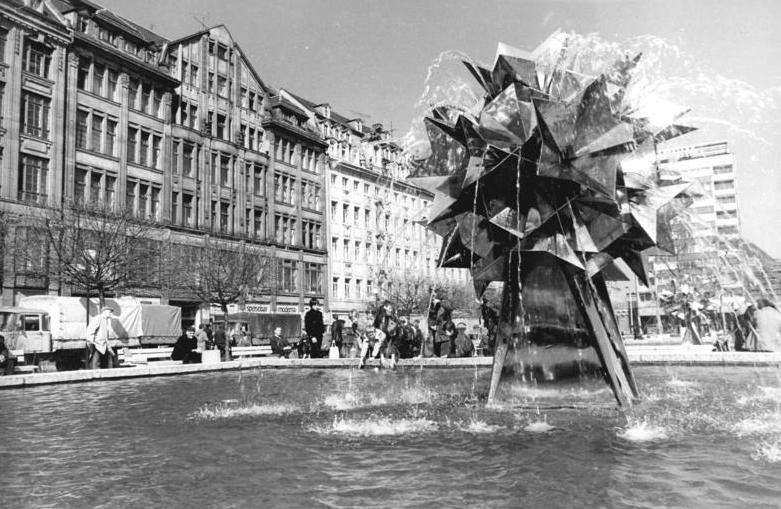
Fountain at Sachsenplatz (1979)

From the beginning of the 18th century, a number of magnificent town houses were built in the Baroque style through new construction or renovation so that Katharinenstrasse was considered the most magnificent street in Leipzig. The Oertels House, the Fregehaus (Frege House), the Romanus House and the Griechenhaus (Greeks House) were built; the houses of Gottlieb Benedict Zemisch (1716–1789), Peter Hohmann (1663–1732), Jobst Heinrich Hansen (1697–1758), and the Schacher and Schellhafer families.

There were several coffee houses on Katharinenstrasse. One of them was the Café Zimmermann in Schellhafer's house. The Leipzig student Collegium Musicum, which Georg Philipp Telemann (1681–1767) had founded as a student in 1702, gave concerts here from 1723 onwards. From 1729 to 1739, Johann Sebastian Bach (1685–1750) directed the Collegium Musicum. The events are considered precursors to the Gewandhaus concerts.

From 1896 to 1936, a single-track tram line ran south through Katharinenstrasse. The remaining tracks were used for diversions or for trade fair traffic until 1951.

By the Bombing of Leipzig in World War II, the east side of Katharinenstrasse was completely destroyed, while the west side was largely preserved. After the rubble was cleared, the east side and other land lay fallow for a long time. In the southern part, a six-story apartment block with a public courtyard was built between 1961 and 1964, the west side of which has the house numbers Katharinenstrasse 2 and 4. The northern part was added to Sachsenplatz, which was built in 1969. This disappeared in 1999 with the construction of the Museum der bildenden Künste.

== Development ==
On the west side of the street, the preserved Baroque buildings (No. 3, 11, 21, 23) as well as Kretschmanns Hof (No. 17) and the Renaissance Revival architecture building from 1896 (No. 13) have been extensively renovated; for the Hansen House (No. 19) the renovation is still pending (as of April 2023). Through Kretschmanns Hof and No. 13, passages lead to Hainstrasse to the houses Blauer und Goldener Stern (Blue and golden star) and Großer Joachimsthal. The Alte Waage (No. 1) and houses Nos. 5–9, which were also destroyed in the war, were replaced by new buildings.

On the east side, after Sachsenplatz was closed, the historic Böttchergäßchen, which ran north of the new building block from 1964 with the Penguin Milk Bar, was restored. The Museum der bildenden Künste, together with four angular new buildings, forms the Museumsquartier Leipzig (fully completed since 2017). Two of the new buildings have their long sides on Katharinenstrasse. Between these is the entrance to the museum, along which stood from 2015 until 2021 the Beethoven statue by Markus Lüpertz (* 1941). The southern of the two new buildings, the Katharinum, completed in 2010, houses, among other things, the tourist information office; the northern one, the Bernstein Carré from 2016/2017, which extends to the Brühl, is also a residential and commercial building. This means that the east side of Katharinenstrasse is once again fully developed.

Buildings on Katharinenstrasse

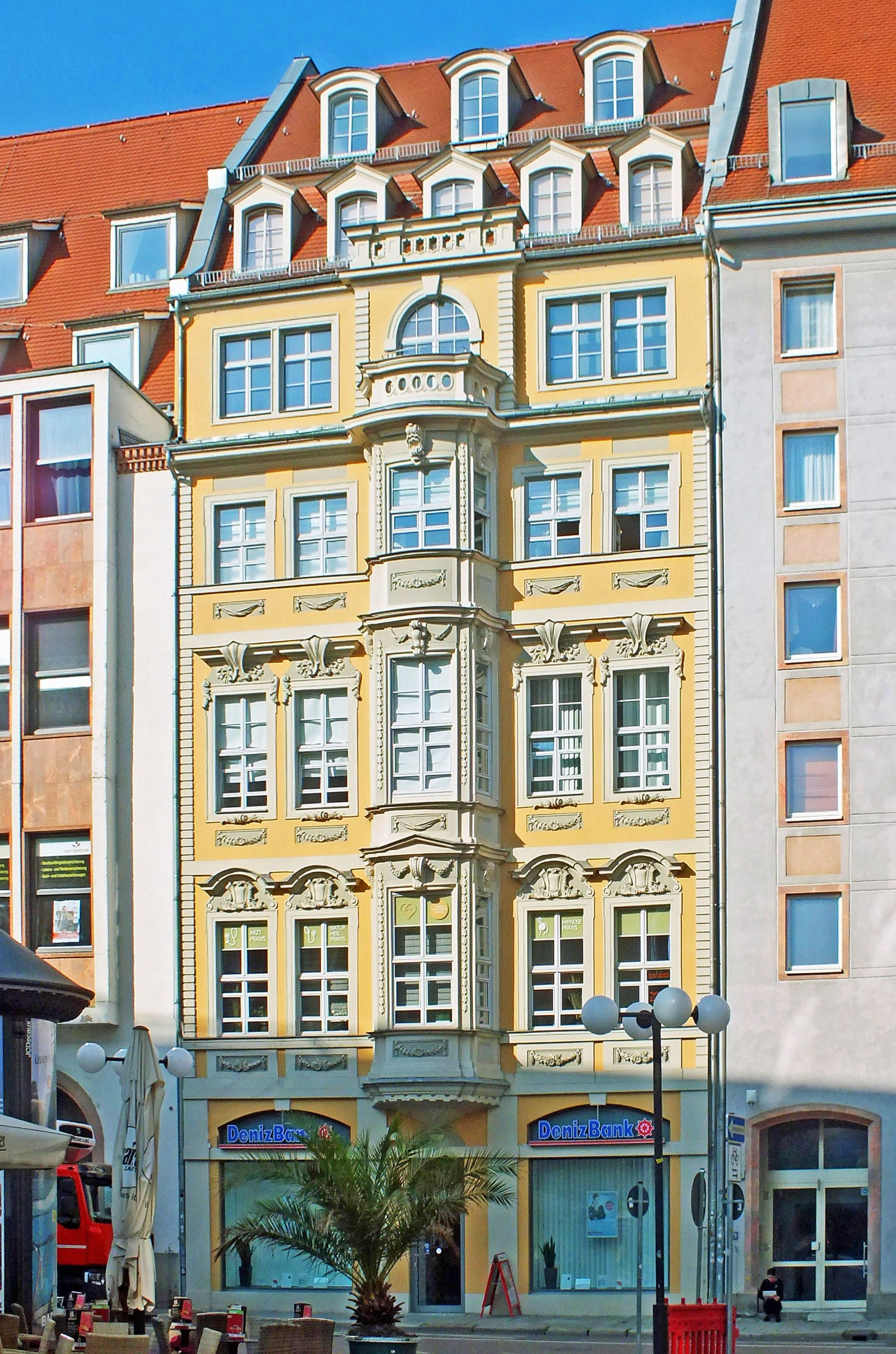
Oertel's House, No. 3 (2017)

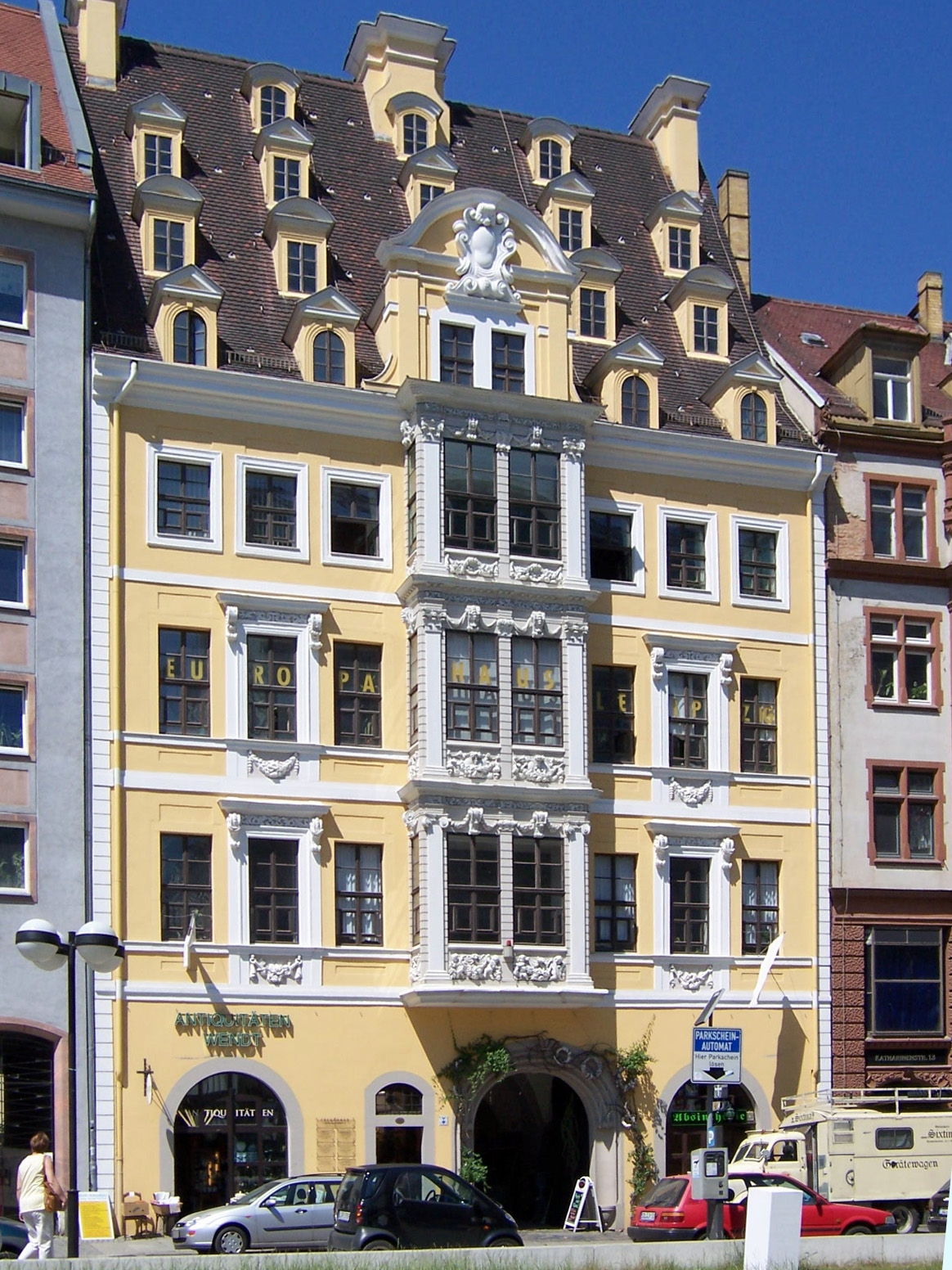
Fregehaus, No. 11 (2006)

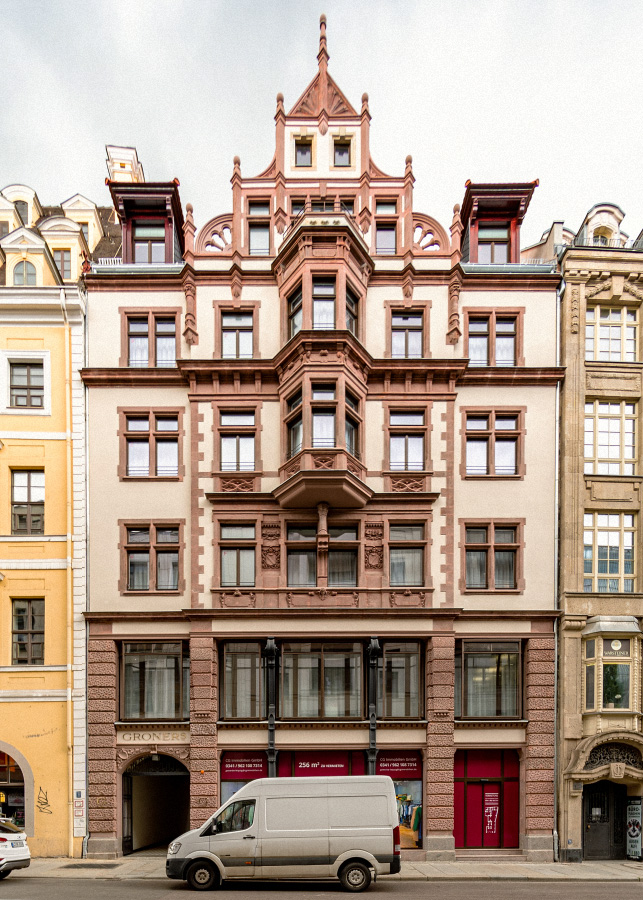
No. 13 (2020)

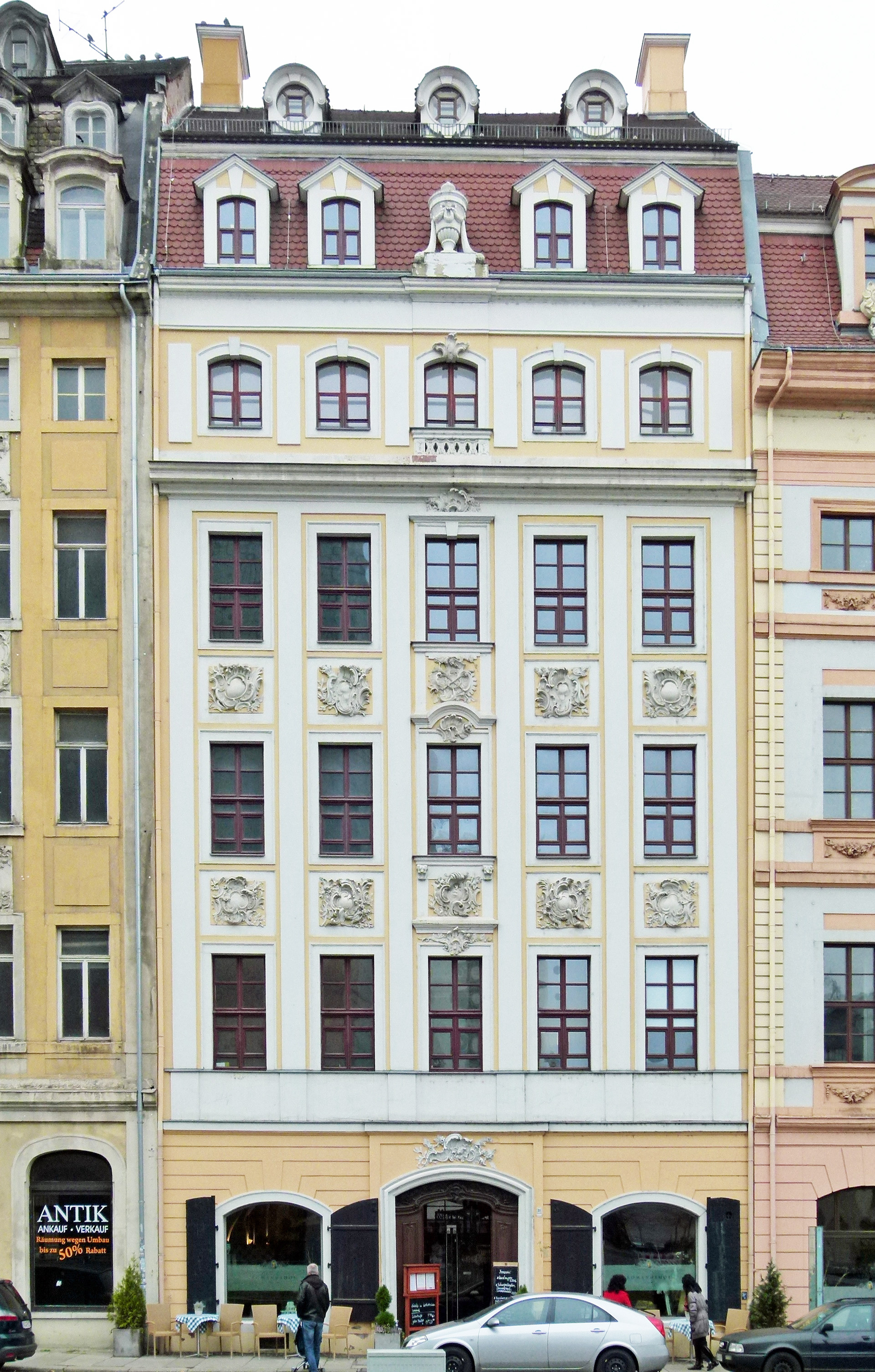
Zemisch's House, No. 21 (2012)

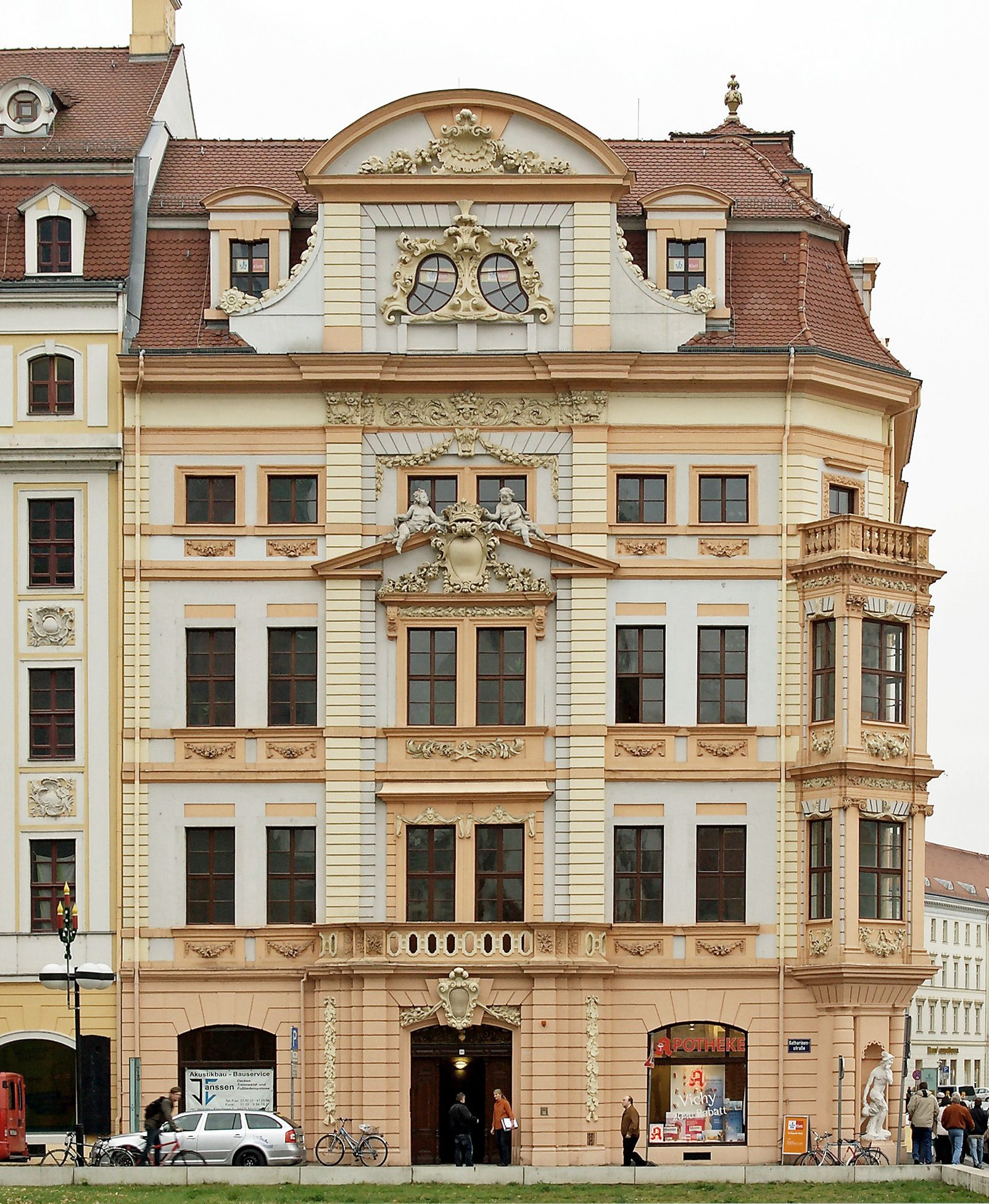
Romanus House, No. 23 (2009)

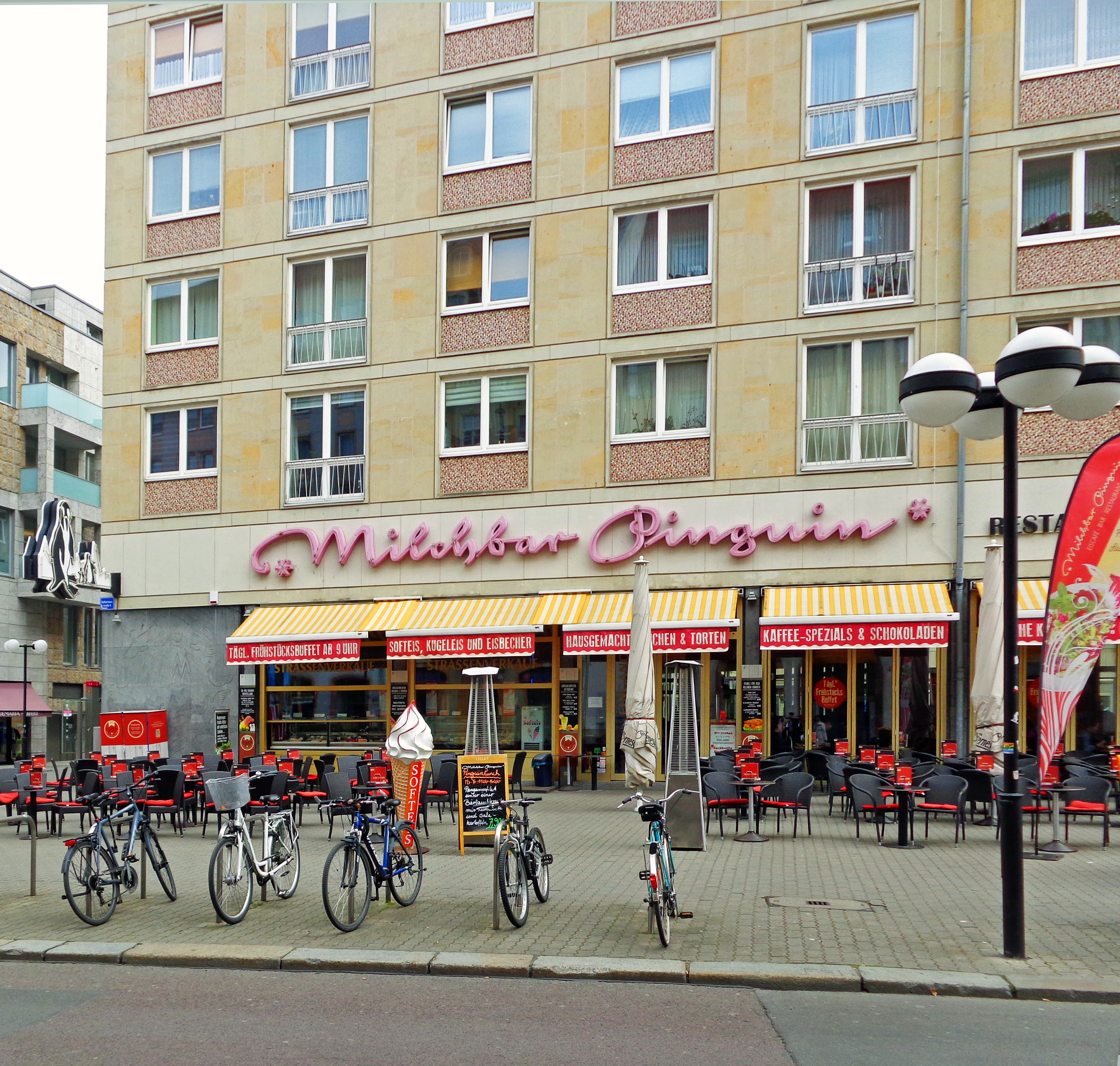
Milchbar Pinguin (Milk Bar Penguin), 2016

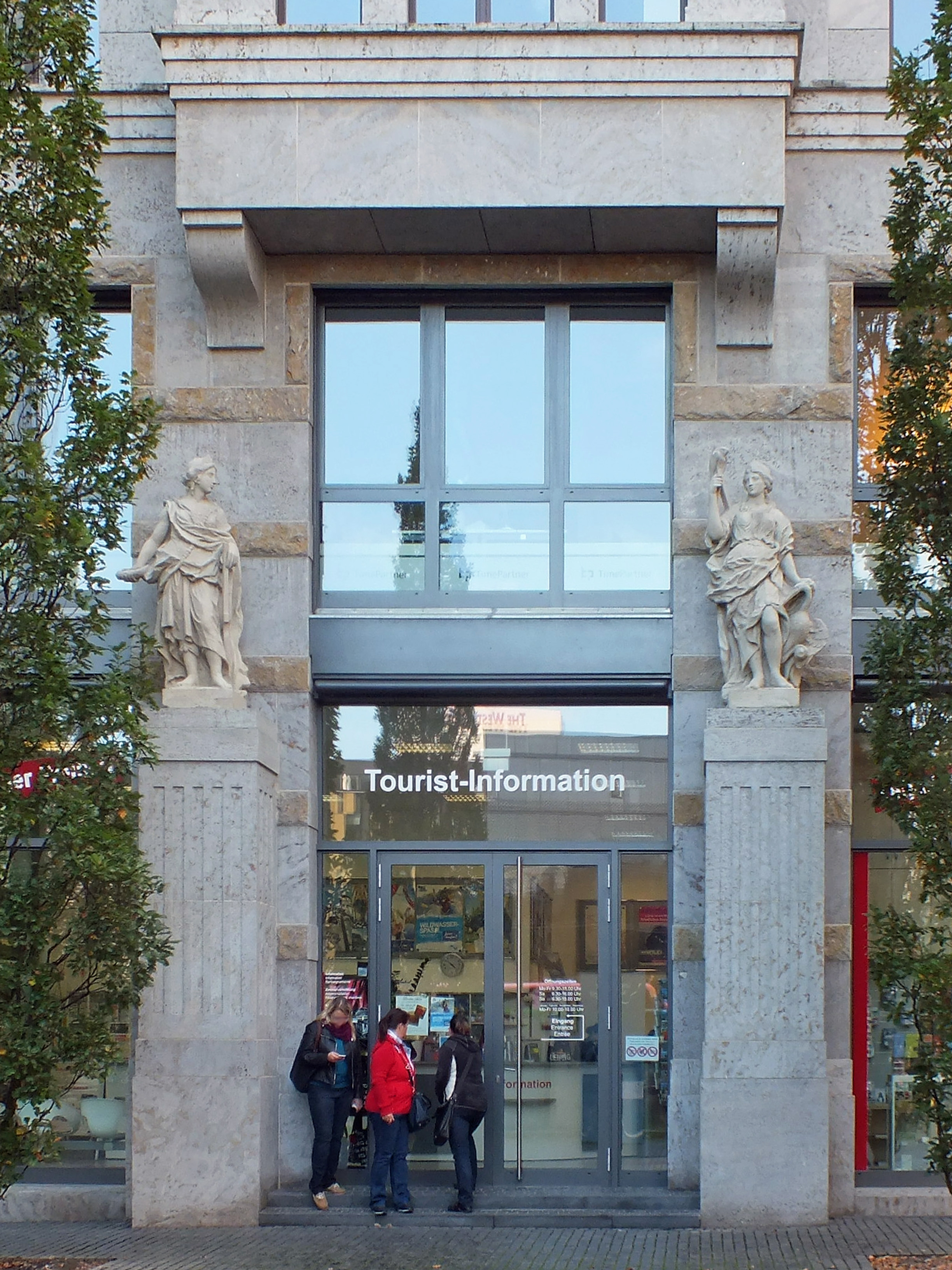
Tourist information in the Katharinum (2014)
