= Ach Gott, wie manches Herzeleid, BWV 58 =

Church cantata by Johann Sebastian Bach

Ach Gott, wie manches Herzeleid
- BWV 58
- Church cantata; Dialogue cantata; by J. S. Bach
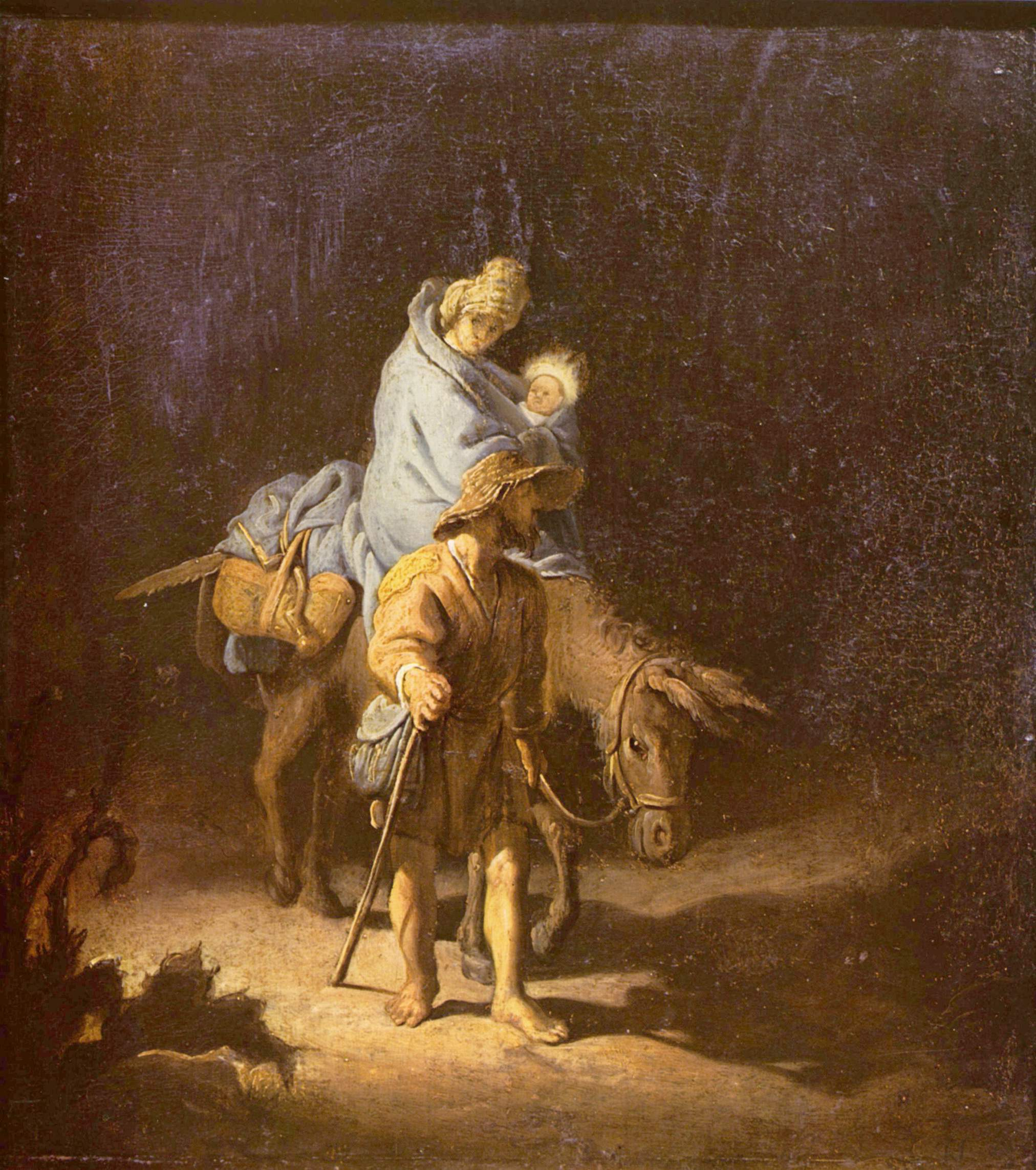
- The Flight into Egypt (Rembrandt, 1627)
- Occasion: Sunday after New Year's Day
- Cantata text: Christoph Birkmann
- Chorale: "Ach Gott, wie manches Herzeleid" (Moller); "Herr Jesu Christ, meins Lebens Licht" (Behm)
- Performed: 5 January 1727: Leipzig
- Movements: 5
- Vocal: soprano; bass
- Instrumental: 2 violins; viola; continuo; (2 oboes); (taille)

Ach Gott, wie manches Herzeleid (Ah God, how much heartbreak), BWV 58, is a church cantata by Johann Sebastian Bach. He composed the dialogue cantata in Leipzig for the Sunday after New Year's Day.

The text has been attributed to Christoph Birkmann by Christine Blanken of the Bach-Archiv Leipzig. He combined the topics of the readings, the gospel of the Flight into Egypt and teaching about the suffering of Christians from the First Epistle of Peter, in a structure of unusual symmetry with a duet as the first and last of the five movements. Both duets are dialogues of the Soul, represented by a soprano, and Jesus, sung by a bass as the vox Christi (voice of Christ). Both duets are set as a chorale fantasia, combining a stanza from a hymn, sung by the soprano as the cantus firmus, with original poetry set in counterpoint. Both stanzas are sung to the same melody, but come from different hymns, Martin Moller's "Ach Gott, wie manches Herzeleid", and Martin Behm's "Herr Jesu Christ, meins Lebens Licht". While the poet wrote the duets to fit the same music, Bach composed them in contrast, even changing the meter of the tune, to fit the different mood: lamenting heartbreak in the beginning, comfort in the end.

Bach scored the work for a small Baroque instrumental ensemble of originally just strings and continuo, probably intended to ease the workload of musicians for the Christmas season. In a later version, he added a trio of oboes to the outer movements. Bach counted the work as part of his cycle of chorale cantatas, which he had begun in 1724. It was presumably first performed on 5 January 1727.

== History and text ==
Bach composed the dialogue cantata the Sunday after New Year's Day, probably of 1727. This occasion happens only in years with a Sunday between New Year's Day and Epiphany on 6 January. The prescribed readings for the day are from the First Epistle of Peter, the suffering of Christians (1 Peter 4:12–19), and from the Gospel of Matthew, the Flight into Egypt (Matthew 2:13–23). In his first year as Thomaskantor (director of church music) in Leipzig, Bach had composed Schau, lieber Gott, wie meine Feind, BWV 153, for this occasion.

The text has been attributed in 2015 to Christoph Birkmann, a theologian and student of Bach, by Christine Blanken of the Bach-Archiv Leipzig. He retells the topic of the gospel in the first recitative, and expands it to the journey, suffering and perils of the contemporary Christian, with a focus on the contrast between suffering on Earth and joy in Heaven. The two outer movements are unusually similar, both duets of the Soul and Jesus, using a hymn stanza and free text. The first movements includes the first stanza of "Ach Gott, wie manches Herzeleid", published by Martin Moller in 1587; the last movement includes the second stanza of Martin Behm's "Herr Jesu Christ, meins Lebens Licht", published in 1610 in the second volume of the collection Centuria precationum rhythmicarum. The melody is the same for both hymns and first appeared in Wolflein Lochamer's Lochamer-Liederbuch (around 1455). The poet's own verse for the two movements is also similar, as if the author expected the composer to repeat the music, but Bach set them differently, even contrasting.

Bach performed the cantata presumably first on 5 January 1727. He performed it again on 4 January 1733 or 3 January 1734. Only this later version survived, for which Bach had added oboes to the orchestra and wrote a new third movement. The surviving continuo part of the original aria suggests a significantly different character. As only the continuo part of the first version of the central aria movement survived, it is unknown if the text was also changed.

Bach counted the work as part of his cycle of chorale cantatas, which he had begun in 1724/25. In that year's Christmas season, the Sunday fell between Christmas and New Year, a different occasion with different prescribed readings. Ach Gott, wie manches Herzeleid is not similar to the early works of that cycle which focus on one Lutheran hymn, such as a cantata on Moller's hymn, Ach Gott, wie manches Herzeleid, BWV 3, composed for the second Sunday after Epiphany of 1725. According to the Bach scholar Alfred Dürr, the cantata is "to be numbered among the successors of the seventeenth-century dialogue compositions as a 'Dialogue of the Faithful Soul with God'".

== Scoring and structure ==
Bach structured the cantata in five movements in a symmetrical arrangement of two framing duets surrounding recitatives and a central aria. Bach scored the work for two vocal soloists (soprano (S) and bass (B)), and a Baroque instrumental ensemble of originally two violins (Vl), viola (Va), and basso continuo. John Eliot Gardiner, who conducted the Bach Cantata Pilgrimage in 2000, notes that the scoring for just two voices and strings was probably intended to ease the workload of musicians who had a busy time during the Christmas season. In the later version, Bach added a trio of two oboes (Ob) and taille (Ot). The duration is given as 17 minutes.

In the following table of the movements, the scoring follows the Neue Bach-Ausgabe of the later version. The keys and time signatures are taken from the book on all cantatas by the Bach scholar Alfred Dürr, using the symbols for common time (4/4). The continuo, playing throughout, is not shown.

Movements of Ach Gott, wie manches Herzeleid
No.	Title	Text	Type	Vocal	Winds	Strings	Key	Time
1	Ach Gott, wie manches Herzeleid	Moller + anon.	Chorale + Aria	S B	2Ob Ot	2Vl Va	C major	3/4
2	Verfolgt dich gleich die arge Welt	anon.	Recitative	B			a minor – F major	common time
3	Ich bin vergnügt in meinem Leiden	anon.	Aria	S		Vl solo	D minor	common time
4	Kann es die Welt nicht lassen	anon.	Recitative	S			F major – A minor	common time
5	Ich hab für mir ein schwere Reis	Behm + anon.	Chorale + Aria	S B	2Ob Ot	2Vl Va	C major	2/4

== Music ==
The structure of the piece is unusually symmetric. It opens and closes with a duet including a chorale text. Harmonically, the piece begins and ends in C major, and the central movement is in D minor. The second movement modulates from A minor to F major, while the fourth movement mirrors this motion.

=== 1 ===
The first movement, "Ach Gott, wie manches Herzeleid" (Ah, God, how much heartache), is a chorale fantasia, with the soprano, representing the Soul, singing the cantus firmus, reinforced by the taille, while the bass as the vox Christi (voice of Christ) delivers original verse in counterpoint to the melody. The melody is tonal but with a "very chromatic subtext". The movement, marked Adagio, begins with a ritornello of strings doubled by oboes. A dotted-rhythm figure, characteristic of a French overture, dominates the music. A figure of lament appears first in the continuo, then also in the upper voices. The ritornello recurs midway through the movement.

=== 2 ===
The secco bass recitative, "Verfolgt dich gleich die arge Welt" (Though the angry world might persecute you), is chromatic and in two sections: the first describes a history of persecution related to the Flight into Egypt with "striding angular phrases", while the second section emphasizes the presence of God using a gentler and smoother melodic line.

=== 3 ===
The third movement, "Ich bin vergnügt in meinem Leiden" (I am cheerful in my sorrow), is a soprano aria with an obbligato solo violin. The da capo movement describes the spirit's confidence in God. The first section includes a "motto theme" transitioning into a "hectic" violin melody. The middle section is characterized by a "muscular" soprano line and "oddly bizarre" solo violin. The first section returns modified and unheralded.

=== 4 ===
The soprano recitative, "Kann es die Welt nicht lassen" (If the world cannot cease), begins by recounting persecution, but quickly becomes an arioso with a walking continuo.

=== 5 ===
The final movement, "Ich hab für mir ein schwere Reis" (I have a difficult journey before me), opens with a triad fanfare, which the bass voice sings on the words "Nur getrost" (Be comforted). It is similar to a motif in Bach's Violin Concerto in E Major, BWV 1042. The soprano reprises the chorale melody in duple rather than the original triple time, with a responding line in the bass voice. After two phrases, the ritornello plays alone for eight measures before both voices re-enter in counterpoint to complete the chorale.

== Recordings ==
- Karl Ristenpart, RIAS Kammerchor, RIAS-Kammerorchester, The RIAS Bach Cantatas Project (1949–1952), Recorded 1952, Published 2012.
- Frank Brieff, Bach Aria Group, Bach Aria Group, Decca, 1960.
- Karl Richter, Münchener Bach-Chor, Münchener Bach-Orchester, Bach Cantatas Vol. 1 – Advent and Christmas. Archiv Produktion, 1970.
- Helmuth Rilling, Gächinger Kantorei, Bach-Collegium Stuttgart, Die Bach Kantate Vol. 20, Hänssler, 1971.
- Nikolaus Harnoncourt, Tölzer Knabenchor, Concentus Musicus Wien, J. S. Bach: Das Kantatenwerk – Sacred Cantatas Vol. 3. Teldec, 1976.
- Michel Corboz, Ensemble vocal de Lausanne, Orchestre de Chambre de Lausanne. Bach Cantatas. Erato, 1976.
- Pieter Jan Leusink, Holland Boys Choir, Netherlands Bach Collegium. Bach Edition Vol. 18 – Cantatas Vol. 9. Brilliant Classics, 2000.
- John Eliot Gardiner, Monteverdi Choir, English Baroque Soloists. Bach Cantatas Vol. 17: Berlin. Soli Deo Gloria, 2000.
- Ton Koopman, Amsterdam Baroque Orchestra & Choir. J. S. Bach: Complete Cantatas Vol. 17. Antoine Marchand, 2003.
- Masaaki Suzuki, Bach Collegium Japan. J. S. Bach: Cantatas Vol. 38 (Solo Cantatas). BIS, 2006.
- Alfredo Bernardini, Kirchheimer BachConsort, Hana Blažíková, Dominik Wörner J. S. Bach Dialogkantaten BWV 32, 57, 58. cpo
