= Sie werden euch in den Bann tun, BWV 44 =

Church cantata composed by Bach

Sie werden euch in den Bann tun
- BWV 44
- Church cantata by J. S. Bach
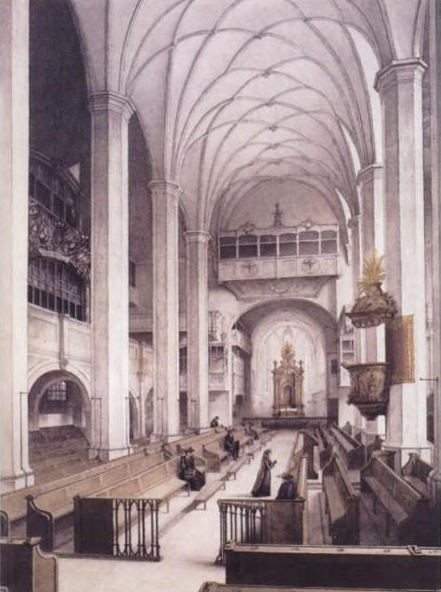
- Thomaskirche, Leipzig
- Occasion: Exaudi, Sunday after Ascension
- Bible text: John 16:2
- Chorale: "Ach Gott, wie manches Herzeleid"; "In allen meinen Taten" by Paul Fleming
- Performed: 21 May 1724: Leipzig
- Movements: 7
- Vocal: SATB soloists and choir
- Instrumental: 2 oboes; 2 violins; viola; continuo

Sie werden euch in den Bann tun (They will put you under banishment), BWV 44, (Note: "BWV" is Bach-Werke-Verzeichnis, a thematic catalogue of Bach's works.) is a church cantata by Johann Sebastian Bach. He composed it in Leipzig for Exaudi, the Sunday after Ascension, and first performed it on 21 May 1724. It is part of his first cantata cycle.

The topic of the cantata, beginning with a quotation from the prescribed reading from the Gospel of John, is the persecution of Christians because of their faith, and the promise of ultimate rescue. The unknown librettist quoted and referred to related Biblical passages. Bach structured the work in seven movements; the first two movements render the quotation from the Gospel as a duet, and an extended chorus. The inner movements are solo works, two pairs of recitatives and aria divided by a solo chorale. The cantata is concluded by a four-part chorale. Bach scored the work for four vocal soloists, a four-part choir and a Baroque instrumental ensemble of oboes, strings and continuo.

== History and words ==
Bach wrote the cantata in his first year in Leipzig for the Sunday Exaudi, the Sunday after Ascension. The prescribed readings for the Sunday were from the First Epistle of Peter, "serve each other" (1 Peter 4:8–11), and from the second Farewell Discourse in the Gospel of John, the promise of the Paraclete, the "Spirit of Truth", and the announcement of persecution (John 15:26–16:4). The unknown poet began with a quotation from the Gospel. One year later, poet Christiana Mariana von Ziegler would begin her cantata text for the same occasion, Sie werden euch in den Bann tun, BWV 183, with the same quotation, but other than that, the two works have little in common.

The poet reflected the persecution of the Christians, confirmed by a chorale as movement 4, the first stanza of Martin Moller's "Ach Gott, wie manches Herzeleid". In movement 5 the poet gave a reason, the Antichrist even thinking to work for God by fighting the Christians and their teaching. In movement 6, the suffering ones are promised God's help. The closing chorale is the final stanza of Paul Fleming's "In allen meinen Taten".

Bach first performed the cantata on 21 May 1724. It is the last original cantata composition of his first annual cycle, followed by reworkings of older music until the beginning of the second annual cycle of chorale cantatas on the first Sunday after Trinity. A performance Wilhelm Friedemann Bach in Halle after 1750 is documented by revisions of the original parts.

== Music ==
=== Structure and scoring ===
Bach structured the cantata in seven movements; as with many works of Georg Philipp Telemann, but rare in Bach's cantatas, the Bible quotation is split in two movements, a duet and a chorus which follows immediately in a different time and faster tempo. He scored the work for soprano (S), alto (A), tenor (T) and bass (B) soloists, a four-part choir SATB, and a Baroque instrumental ensemble of two oboes (Ob), two violins (Vl), viola (Va) and basso continuo.

In the following table of the movements, the scoring follows the Neue Bach-Ausgabe. The keys and time signatures are taken from Alfred Dürrs's standard book The Cantatas of J. S. Bach, using the symbol for common time (4/4). He gave the duration as 22 minutes. The basso continuo, playing throughout, is not shown.

Movements of Sie werden euch in den Bann tun, BWV 44
No.	Title	Type	Vocal	Winds	Strings	Key	Time
1	Sie werden euch in den Bann tun	Duet	Tenor, bass	2Ob		G minor	3/4
2	Es kömmt aber die Zeit	Chorus	SATB	2Ob	2Vl, Va	G minor	common time
3	Christen müssen auf der Erden	Aria	Alto	Ob		C minor	3/4
4	Ach Gott, wie manches Herzeleid	Chorale	Tenor				common time
5	Es sucht der Antichrist	Recitative	Bass				common time
6	Es ist und bleibt der Christen Trost	Aria	Soprano	2Ob	2Vl, Va	B-flat major	common time
7	So sei nun, Seele, deine	Chorale	SATB	Ob (col soprano), Ob (coll'alto)	Vl (col soprano), Vl (coll'slto), Va (col tenore)	B-flat major	common time

=== Music ===
==== 1 and 2 ====
The duet is an expressive lamento, introduced by the two oboes in imitation on themes which the voices pick up. The representation of the voice of Jesus by tenor and bass is reminiscent of Heinrich Schütz, and the way to go instantly from duet to chorus is a feature that Telemann frequently uses. The chorus has been described as "tumultuous and excited" and likened to the rendering of the excited crowd (turba) in Bach's St John Passion and St Matthew Passion. It follows the text in mostly homophonic sections with independent instruments. The beginning, "Es kömmt aber die Zeit" (But the time will come), is rendered in block chords (Akkordblöcke) as "repeated rhetorical calls". In the following "daß, wer euch tötet" (when whoever kills you), the word "töten" is "twice emphasized by a sudden, mysterious piano and wan, chromatically tinged harmonies", according to the Bach scholar Klaus Hofmann, or "menacing chromatic texture of sustained notes underpinned by unexpected harmonies", according to Julian Mincham. Finally "wird meinen, er tue Gott einen Dienst daran" (will think that he does God a service by it) is interpreted by free imitation. After this sequential presentation of the three ideas of the text, they are repeated in variation and combination. Mincham summarised the "uncompromising" tone of the statement "the time will come when your murderer will believe that he has done a service to God".

==== 3 ====
Movement 3 refers to the opening in tranquil 3/4 time with an obbligato oboe. The words "Marter, Bann und schwere Pein" (martyrdom, exile, and bitter pain) are coloured in expressive chromatic, although the text speaks of overcoming them. Hofmann described "sigh-like suspension and emotionally charged harmonic darkening".

==== 4 ====
The commenting chorale, on the almost unadorned melody of "Herr Jesu Christ, meins Lebens Licht", is sung by the tenor on an ostinato in the continuo derived from the first line of the chorale. Hofmann observed in the continuo ostinato that "at the place where the song text has the word "Herzeleid" (heart ache), it is expanded by means of chromatic notes in between – a figurative expression of sorrow, of the lamentation that characterizes the whole movement". Mincham noted that this central chorale "seems almost to pre-empt the atonal harmonies of the twentieth century".

==== 5 and 6 ====
The following short secco recitative marks a turning point, resulting in an aria of consolation in dance-like movement, accompanied by the strings doubled by the oboes. In the middle section, storms and "winds of trouble" give way to "the sun of joy soon smiled" (die Freudensonne bald gelacht), expressed in vivid coloraturas.

==== 7 ====
The cantata closes with a four-part chorale setting on the melody of "O Welt, ich muß dich lassen", which resembles the setting of the same melody in movement 10 of the St Matthew Passion, "Ich bins, ich sollte büßen".

== Recordings ==
- Bach Cantatas Vol. 3 – Ascension Day, Whitsun, Trinity, Karl Richter, Münchener Bach-Chor, Münchener Bach-Orchester, Ernst Haefliger, Edith Mathis, Anna Reynolds, Dietrich Fischer-Dieskau, Archiv Produktion 1975
- J. S. Bach: Das Kantatenwerk – Sacred Cantatas Vol. 3, Nikolaus Harnoncourt, Wiener Sängerknaben, Chorus Viennensis, Concentus Musicus Wien, soloist of the Wiener Sängerknaben, Paul Esswood, Kurt Equiluz, Ruud van der Meer, Teldec 1975
- East German Revolution, Hans-Joachim Rotzsch, Thomanerchor, Gewandhausorchester, Regina Werner, Gerda Schriever, Peter Menzel, Hermann Christian Polster, Pilz mid-1970s?
- Die Bach Kantate Vol. 35, Helmuth Rilling, Gächinger Kantorei, Bach-Collegium Stuttgart, Arleen Augér, Helen Watts, Aldo Baldin, Wolfgang Schöne, Hänssler 1979
- J. S. Bach: Himmelfahrts-Oratorium, Philippe Herreweghe, Collegium Vocale Gent, Barbara Schlick, Catherine Patriasz, Christoph Prégardien, Peter Kooy, Harmonia Mundi France 1993
- J. S. Bach: Complete Cantatas Vol. 10, Ton Koopman, Amsterdam Baroque Orchestra & Choir, Caroline Stam, Michael Chance, Paul Agnew, Klaus Mertens, Antoine Marchand 1998
- Bach Edition Vol. 5 – Cantatas Vol. 2, Pieter Jan Leusink, Holland Boys Choir, Netherlands Bach Collegium, Ruth Holton, Sytse Buwalda, Knut Schoch, Bas Ramselaar, Brilliant Classics 1999
- J. S. Bach: Cantatas Vol. 20 – Cantatas from Leipzig 1724 – BWV 44, 59, 173, 184, Masaaki Suzuki, Bach Collegium Japan, Yukari Nonoshita, Mutsumi Hatano, Gerd Türk, Peter Kooy, BIS 2001
- J. S. Bach: Cantatas for the Complete Liturgical Year Vol. 10: "Himmelfahrts-Oratorium " - Cantatas BWV 108 · 86 · 11 · 44, Sigiswald Kuijken, La Petite Bande, Siri Thornhill, Petra Noskaiová, Christoph Genz, Jan van der Crabben, Accent 2008
