= Schau, lieber Gott, wie meine Feind, BWV 153 =

Church cantata by Johann Sebastian Bach

Schau, lieber Gott, wie meine Feind
- BWV 153
- Church cantata by J. S. Bach
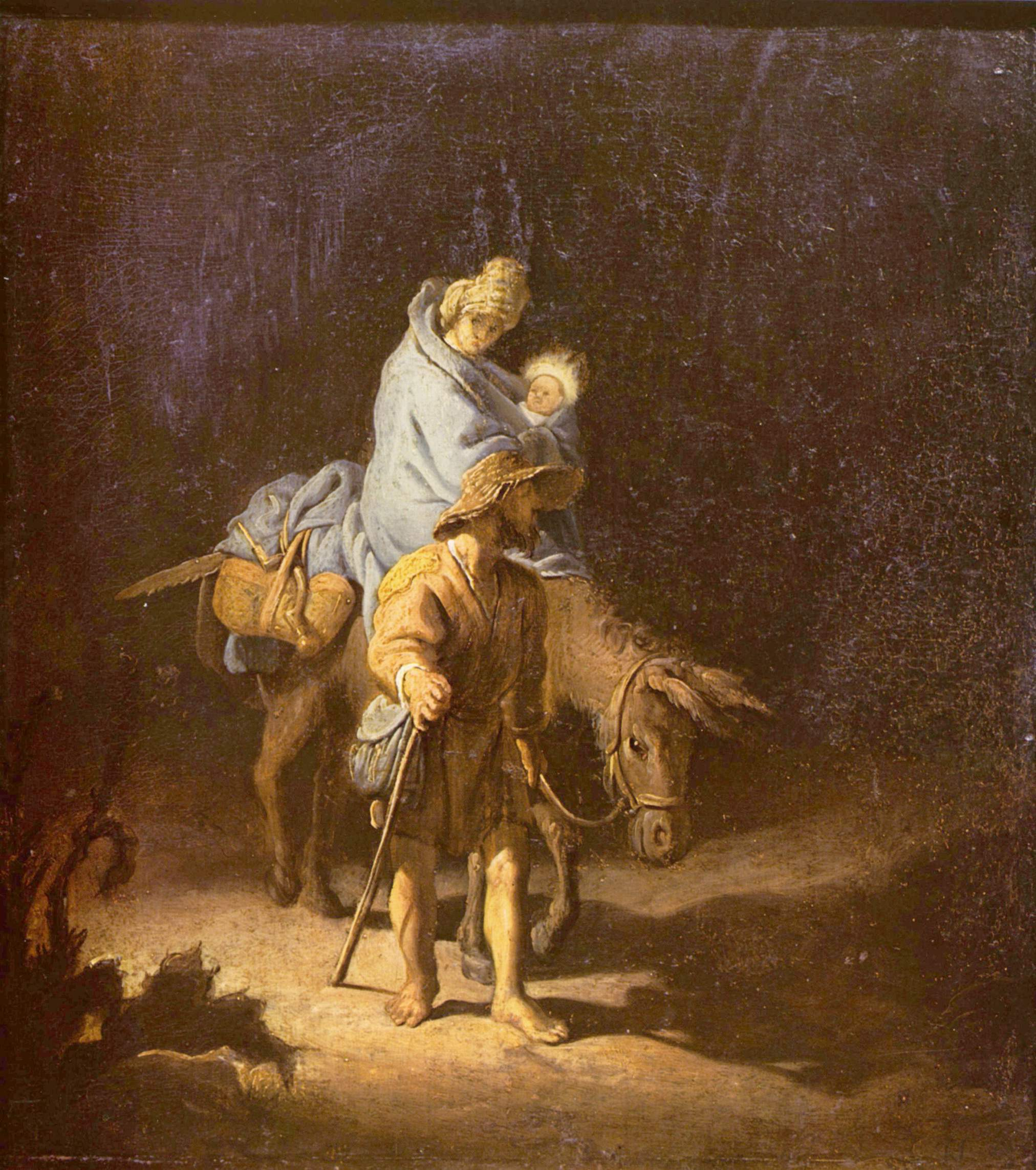
- Rembrandt: Flight into Egypt (1627), topic of the Gospel
- Occasion: Sunday after New Year's Day
- Bible text: Isaiah 41:10
- Chorale: "Schau, lieber Gott, wie meine Feind" by David Denicke; "Befiehl du deine Wege" by Paul Gerhardt; "Ach Gott, wie manches Herzeleid" by Martin Moller
- Performed: 2 January 1724: Leipzig
- Movements: 9
- Vocal: SATB choir; Alto, tenor and bass solo
- Instrumental: 2 violins; viola; continuo

Schau, lieber Gott, wie meine Feind (See, dear God, how my enemies), BWV 153, is a church cantata by Johann Sebastian Bach. He composed it in Leipzig for the Sunday after New Year's Day and first performed it on 2 January 1724.

== History and words ==
Bach wrote the cantata in his first year in Leipzig for the Sunday after New Year's Day and first performed it on 2 January 1724. The prescribed readings for the day are from the First Epistle of Peter, the suffering of Christians (1 Peter 4:12–19), and from the Gospel of Matthew, the Flight into Egypt (Matthew 2:13–23). The unknown poet took Herod's Massacre of the Innocents and the Flight into Egypt as a starting point to reflect in general the situation of the Christians confronted with enemies. The poet is possibly the same person as the author of the two Christmas cantatas Darzu ist erschienen der Sohn Gottes, BWV 40, and Sehet, welch eine Liebe hat uns der Vater erzeiget, BWV 64, performed shortly before, because three hymn stanzas are featured in all three works. The cantata opens with a chorale, the first stanza of David Denicke's "Schau, lieber Gott, wie meine Feind" (1646). Movement 5 is stanza 5 of Paul Gerhardt's "Befiehl du deine Wege" (1656), known as movement 44 of the St Matthew Passion. The words speak of the utmost enemies: "Und ob gleich alle Teufel" (And even if all devils). The cantata ends with stanzas 16 to 18 of the chorale "Ach Gott, wie manches Herzeleid" (1587), attributed to Martin Moller. Bach would later write a chorale cantata Ach Gott, wie manches Herzeleid, BWV 3 on this chorale, and use its first stanza in Ach Gott, wie manches Herzeleid, BWV 58.

== Scoring and structure ==
The cantata in nine movements is scored for a chamber ensemble of alto, tenor and bass soloists, a four-part choir, two violins, viola, and basso continuo.

1. Chorale: Schau, lieber Gott, wie meine Feind
2. Recitative (alto): Mein liebster Gott, ach laß dichs doch erbarmen
3. Arioso (bass): Fürchte dich nicht
4. Recitative (tenor): Du sprichst zwar, lieber Gott
5. Chorale: Und ob gleich alle Teufel
6. Aria (tenor): Stürmt nur, stürmt, ihr Trübsalswetter
7. Recitative (bass): Getrost! Mein Herz
8. Aria (alto): Soll ich meinen Lebenslauf
9. Chorale: Drum will ich, weil ich lebe noch

== Music ==
This cantata opens with a four-part chorale, which is unusual for Bach's cantatas. It was the fifth cantata (and the fourth new one) of the 1723 Christmas season after BWV 63, BWV 40, BWV 64, and BWV 190, while one more for Epiphany, BWV 65, was still to come; Bach may have wanted to ease the workload for the Thomanerchor. All recitatives are secco, accompanied by the continuo, but movements 4 and 7 open with an arioso. Movement 3 is marked Arioso by Bach, but is almost an aria. The Bible word from Isaiah 41:10, "Fürchte dich nicht, ich bin mit dir" ("Fear not, I am with you"), is given to the bass as the vox Christi. The opening ritornello of eight measures is present for most of the movement, transposed to different keys.

Only two of the nine movements are arias. The first aria, movement 6, illustrates the enemies in fast violin passages, sharp dotted rhythms played in unison, and bold harmonic development. Gardiner compares its intensity to Peter’s aria Ach, mein Sinn from the St John Passion (No. 13).

The second aria, movement 8, is a minuet, which Bach probably derived from his secular music, depicting eternal joy. Twice the instruments play a section and then repeat it with the voice woven into it. In the second vocal section, the words "Daselbsten verwechselt mein Jesus das Leiden mit seliger Wonne, mit ewigen Freuden" (and there my Jesus exchanges sorrow for blessed delight, for eternal joy) are presented on a new theme, marked allegro, then the instruments repeat their second section as a postlude.

== Recordings ==
- Die Bach Kantate Vol. 20, Helmuth Rilling, Gächinger Kantorei, Bach-Collegium Stuttgart, Ann Murray, Adalbert Kraus, Walter Heldwein, Hänssler 1978
- J. S. Bach: Das Kantatenwerk – Sacred Cantatas Vol. 8, Nikolaus Harnoncourt, Tölzer Knabenchor, Concentus Musicus Wien, Stefan Rampf (Soloist of the Tölzer Knabenchor), Kurt Equiluz, Thomas Hampson, Teldec 1985
- J. S. Bach: Complete Cantatas Vol. 9, Ton Koopman, Amsterdam Baroque Orchestra & Choir, Bernhard Landauer, Christoph Prégardien, Klaus Mertens, Antoine Marchand 1998
- Bach Cantatas Vol. 17: New York, John Eliot Gardiner, Monteverdi Choir, English Baroque Soloists, Sally Bruce-Payne, James Gilchrist, Peter Harvey, Soli Deo Gloria 2000
- J. S. Bach: Cantatas Vol. 17, Masaaki Suzuki, Bach Collegium Japan, Robin Blaze, Gerd Türk, Peter Kooy, BIS 2001
- J. S. Bach: Cantatas for the Complete Liturgical Year Vol. 4, Sigiswald Kuijken, La Petite Bande, Elisabeth Hermans, Petra Noskaiová, Jan Kobow, Jan van der Crabben, Accent 2006

== Sources ==
- Schau, lieber Gott, wie meine Feind, BWV 153: Scores at the International Music Score Library Project
- Schau, lieber Gott, wie meine Feind BWV 153; BC A 25 / Sacred cantata (2nd Sunday of Christmas) Bach Digital
- Cantata BWV 153 Schau, lieber Gott, wie meine Feind: history, scoring, sources for text and music, translations to various languages, discography, discussion, Bach Cantatas Website
- BWV 153 Schau, lieber Gott, wie meine Feind: English translation, University of Vermont
- BWV 153 Schau, lieber Gott, wie meine Feind: text, scoring, University of Alberta
- Chapter 34 BWV 153 Schau, lieber Gott, wie meine Feind: a listener and student guide by Julian Mincham, 2010
