= Mutsumi =

Mutsumi (むつみ, 六実, 睦, ムツミ, 六ツ美) is a Japanese name. It is both a family name and a given name, most often for females but sometimes also for males.

== Given name ==
- Mutsumi Fujisaki, a.k.a. Miyu Uehara (1987–2011), Japanese model
- Mutsumi Fukuhara, Japanese singer
- Mutsumi Hatano (波多野 睦美), Japanese mezzo-soprano
- Mutsumi Inomata, Japanese animator
- Mutsumi Kanamori, British musician, also known as Mutsumi or MU
- Mutsumi Sasaki, Japanese manga artist
- Mutsumi Takahashi, Canadian-Japanese journalist
- Mutsumi Takayama, Japanese figure skater
- Mutsumi Tamabayashi (玉林 睦実; born 1984), Japanese footballer
- Mutsumi Tamura (born 1987) Japanese voice actress

== Surname ==
- Goro Mutsumi, Japanese actor

== Fictional characters ==
- Mutsumi, from Utawarerumono
- Mutsumi Aasu, from Puni Puni Poemy
- Mutsumi Akiyoshi, from Dear Boys
- Mutsumi Aokaze, from You and Idol Pretty Cure
- Mutsumi Otohime, from Love Hina
- Mutsumi Saburo, from Sgt. Frog
- Mutsumi Wakaba (若葉 睦), a fictional character in the media franchise BanG Dream!

== See also ==
- 7837 Mutsumi, a main-belt asteroid
- Mutsumi Station, a Japanese railway station
- Mutsumi, Yamaguchi, a former village
- Mitsumi
