= Hatano =

Hatano (written: 波多野, 羽多野, 秦野 or 畑野) is a Japanese surname. Notable people with the surname include:

- Akira Hatano (秦野 章, 1911–2002), Japanese politician
- Go Hatano (波多野 豪, born 1998), Japanese footballer
- Hatano Hideharu (波多野 秀治, 1541–1579), Japanese daimyō
- Hiroko Hatano (畑野 ひろ子, born 1975), Japanese model and actress
- Isoko Hatano (波多野 勤子, 1905–1978), Japanese psychologist and writer
- Kazutoshi Hatano (波多野 和俊, born 1979), Japanese voice actor
- Mutsumi Hatano (波多野 睦美), Japanese mezzo-soprano
- Hatano Norinao (波多野 敬直, 1850-1922), Grand Chamberlain of Japan (1912)
- Seiichi Hatano (波多野 精一, 1877–1950), Japanese philosopher
- Wataru Hatano (羽多野 渉, born 1982), Japanese voice actor
- Yusuke Hatano (波多野 裕介, born 1986), Japanese composer and arranger
- Yui Hatano (波多野 結衣, born 1988), Japanese porn actress
