= Ach Gott, wie manches Herzeleid =

- Hymn
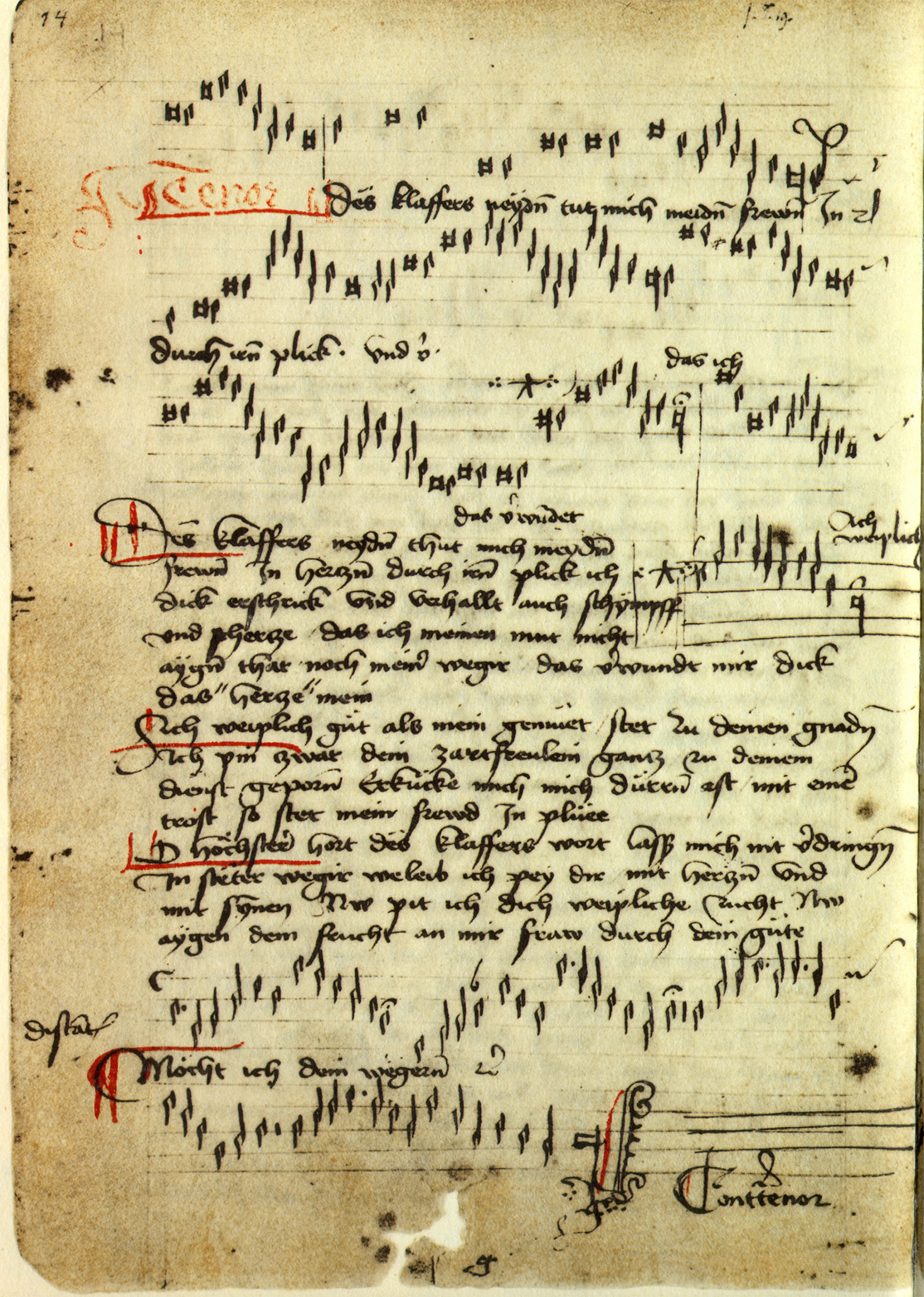
- Anon melody, Lochamer-Liederbuch (c. 1455)
- English: Oh God, how much heartache
- Catalogue: Zahn 533, 547–549
- Text: by Martin Moller
- Language: German
- Published: 1587

"Ach Gott, wie manches Herzeleid" (Oh God, how much heartache) is a hymn in German in 18 stanzas attributed to Martin Moller (1587). It is often catalogued as a paraphrase of the Latin "Jesu dulcis memoria", a medieval hymn attributed to Bernard of Clairvaux, but only a few lines refer directly to this song. Hymn tunes were composed for the hymn (Zahn Nos. 547–549), and it is also often sung to a tune composed for "Herr Jesu Christ, meins Lebens Licht" (Zahn No. 533). The anonymous hymn tune of "Herr Jesu Christ, meins Lebens Licht" first appeared in Wolflein Lochamer's Lochamer-Liederbuch, written in Nürnberg around 1455. In Leipzig in the 1720s, Johann Sebastian Bach composed settings of the hymn based on four of his church cantatas and a sacred motet.

== Musical settings and harmonization ==
Johann Sebastian Bach used the final three stanzas of Ach Gott, wie manches Herzeleid to conclude Schau, lieber Gott, wie meine Feind, BWV 153, a church cantata composed for the Sunday after New Year's Day, 2 January 1724, and the first stanza of the hymn as movement 4 of Sie werden euch in den Bann tun, BWV 44, for Exaudi, the Sunday after Ascension, 21 May 1724.

The entire hymn is also the base for Bach's Ach Gott, wie manches Herzeleid, BWV 3, a chorale cantata composed in Leipzig for the second Sunday after Epiphany, 14 January 1725. Bach also used the melody in two movements of Ach Gott, wie manches Herzeleid, BWV 58, a cantata for the Sunday after New Year's Day, 5 January 1727, and he used the melody with the hymn text "O Jesu Christ, meins Lebens Licht" for the eponymous motet (BWV 118).
