= Vox Christi =

Type of Christian vocal work

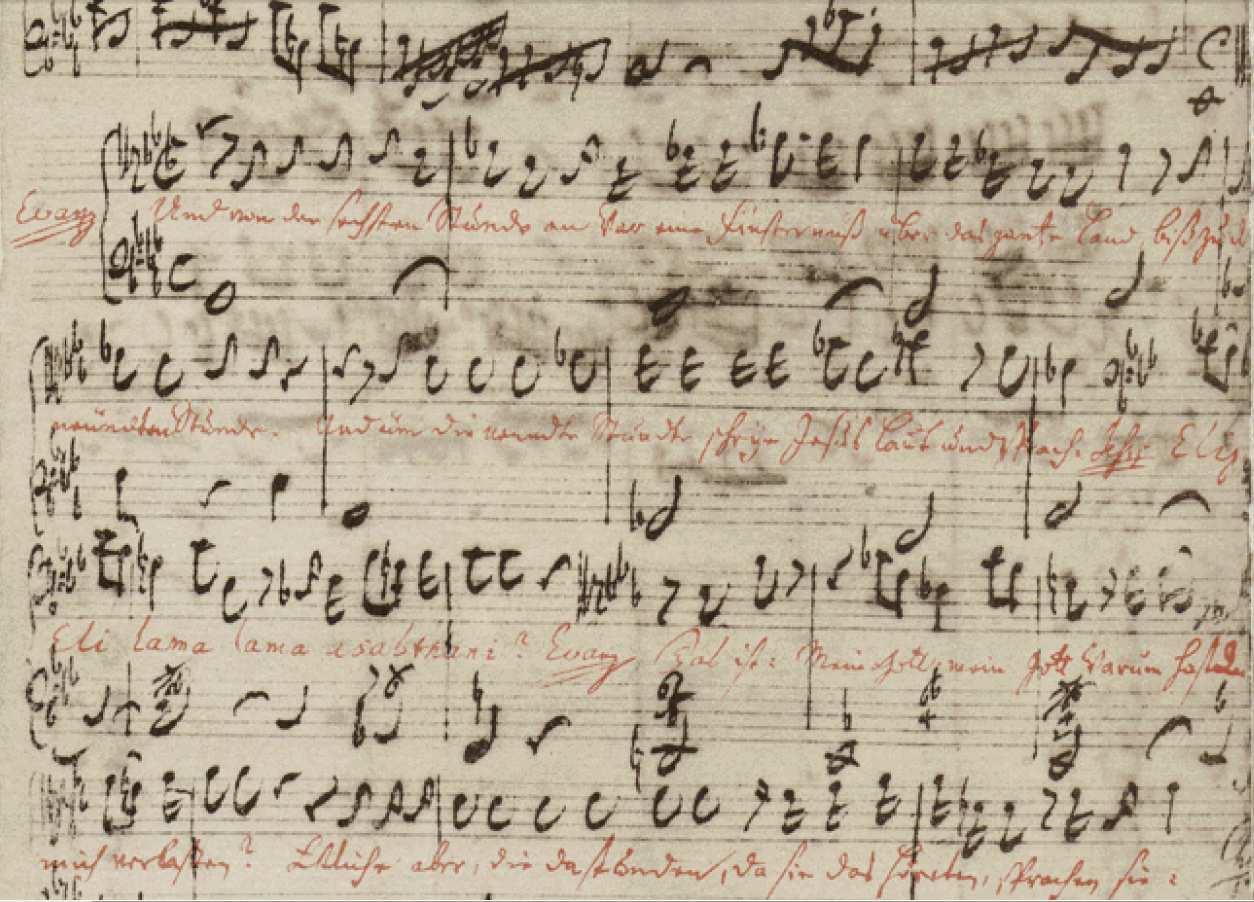
Evangelist and vox Christi combination in Bach's St Matthew Passion

Vox Christi, Latin for Voice of Christ, is a setting of Jesus' words in a vocal work such as a Passion, an Oratorium or a Cantata. Conventionally, for instance in Protestant music of the Baroque era, the vox Christi is set for a bass voice.

In Protestant Germany the words of the vox Christi are in German: when the vocal work contains a sung Gospel reading, such as in Bach's Passions, the words are taken from Luther's Bible translation, but the words may also be free verse, as for instance in the Brockes Passion. In either case the composition may also contain a setting of an Evangelist's words, which are traditionally set for a tenor voice.

Apart from a difference in voice type, settings of Jesus' words in recitatives can be further differentiated from surrounding text settings by, for instance, giving them a more arioso character, or setting them accompagnato (while the Evangelist and other characters sing secco).

== Passions and Oratorios of the first half of the 18th century ==
Jesus Christus ist um unsrer Missetat willen verwundet is a St Mark Passion which originated in Hamburg in the first decade of the 18th century. Johann Sebastian Bach's first staging of this Passion music was in Weimar c.1712. Its vox Christi bass appears in secco and accompagnato recitatives, and in an arioso on the Gospel words "Eli, eli, lama asabthani". In his Brockes Passion George Frideric Handel set Jesus' words for bass in recitatives, ariosos and arias. The Evangelist's recitatives are set for tenor.

In Bach's extant Passion compositions the vox Christi bass combines with an Evangelist's tenor voice. The Evangelist narrates the story in the Gospel's exact words in recitative secco. In the St John Passion the words of Jesus are set as recitatives secco leaning toward arioso. In the St Matthew Passion they are in accompanied recitative, that is they are additionally highlighted by an accompaniment of strings and basso continuo. The Vox Christi also appears in Bach's Christmas Oratorio, and in his Ascension Oratorio.

== Bach's cantatas ==
In Bach's church cantatas the vox Christi may utter either literal words from the Bible which are neither direct quotes of or even attributed to Christ but are presented in the context of the musical work as being made by Christ, or extra-biblical words, for example in a dialogue between the Bridegroom (Christ) and the Bride (the Soul), or in an address to the Bride.

In Bach's Weimar cantatas (1714–1716):

- In Himmelskönig, sei willkommen, BWV 182, (25 March 1714), Bach's first cantata in Weimar, for Palm Sunday coinciding with Annunciation, verses from a Psalm are treated as if Jesus said them, set as the only recitative of the cantata, expanding to an Arioso: "Siehe, ich komme, im Buch ist von mir geschrieben" ("Lo, I come: in the volume of the book [it is] written of me, I delight to do thy will." Psalms 40:7—8.
- In Erschallet, ihr Lieder, erklinget, ihr Saiten! BWV 172 (20 May 1714) for Pentecost the bass sings the words of Christ from the Gospel of John: "Wer mich liebet, der wird mein Wort halten" ("If a man love me, he will keep my words: and my Father will love him, and we will come unto him, and make our abode with him." John 14:23.
- In Nun komm, der Heiden Heiland, BWV 61, (2 December 1714) the bass sings the words of Christ from the Book of Revelation: "Siehe, ich stehe vor der Tür und klopfe an. So jemand meine Stimme hören wird und die Tür auftun, zu dem werde ich eingehen und das Abendmahl mit ihm halten und er mit mir." ("Behold, I stand at the door, and knock: if any man hear my voice, and open the door, I will come in to him, and will sup with him, and he with me. " Revelation 3:20.
- In Barmherziges Herze der ewigen Liebe, BWV 185, (14 July 1715), the bass summarizes admonitions from the Sermon on the Mount, all introduced by the keywords "Das ist der Christen Kunst" (That is the Christian art).
- In Bereitet die Wege, bereitet die Bahn, BWV 132, (22 December 1715) the question Wer bist du? (Who are you), posed to St. John in the Gospel, is given to the bass, as if Jesus asked the listener this question.
- In Mein Gott, wie lang, ach lange? BWV 155, (19 January 1716) serious questions get answered by words of consolation, sung by the bass as the vox Christi, almost as an arioso on the words "Damit sein Gnadenlicht dir desto lieblicher erscheine" (so that the light of His grace might shine on you all the more brightly).

In Bach's first cantata cycle (1723–1724):

- In Jesus nahm zu sich die Zwölfe, BWV 22 (7 February 1723, Oculi Sunday), the cantata starts with a scene from the Gospel, the announcement of suffering in Jerusalem, quoting Luke 18:31,34. The tenor as the Evangelist begins the narration from the verse 31, Jesus nahm zu sich die Zwölfe (Jesus gathered the twelve to Himself). The bass sings the announcement of the suffering, Sehet, wir gehn hinauf gen Jerusalem (Behold, we go up to Jerusalem), A choral fugue illustrates the reaction of the disciples.
- In O Ewigkeit, du Donnerwort, BWV 60, (7 November 1723) the bass as the voice of Christ answers in dialogue a recitative of the tormented Fear three times with Selig sind die Toten.
- In Schau, lieber Gott, wie meine Feind, BWV 153, (2 January 1724) the Bible word from Isaiah 41:10, "Fürchte dich nicht, ich bin mit dir" ("Fear not, I am with you"), is given to the bass as the vox Christi, as if Jesus said it himself.
- In Mein liebster Jesus ist verloren, BWV 154, (9 January 1724) the bass sings in an arioso the answer of Jesus, found in the temple 12 years old, to the questioning of his desperate parents: "Wisset ihr nicht, daß ich sein muß in dem, das meines Vaters ist?" ("Do you not know that I must be in that which is My Father's?", Luke 2:49.
- In Jesus schläft, was soll ich hoffen? BWV 81, (30 January 1724) the bass sings in an arioso, central within the cantata, the question of Jesus: "Ihr Kleingläubigen, warum seid ihr so furchtsam?" (Why are ye fearful, O ye of little faith?), Matthew 8:26.
- The sixth movement of Halt im Gedächtnis Jesum Christ, BWV 67, (16 April 1724) is an "operatic scene", with the bass serenely repeating the words of Jesus from the Gospel, "Peace be with you", four times (three times each), contrasted by agitated choral answers which see Jesus as help in the battle, in strengthening of the weary in spirit and body, and in overcoming death.
- Cantata Wo gehest du hin? BWV 166, (7 May 1724) is opened by the bass singing a quote from the gospel, the third Farewell Discourse, but turned into a general question about the direction of life.
- In the cantata Wahrlich, wahrlich, ich sage euch, BWV 86, (14 May 1724) the bass sings in the opening movement three times the promise from the Farewell Discourse of Jesus: "Verily, verily, I say unto you, whatsoever ye shall ask the Father in my name, he will give you" (John 16:23).

Bach uses the Vox Christi in several cantatas of his second cycle (1724–1725):

- In chorale cantatas composed in his second year in Leipzig:
  - In the cantata Christ unser Herr zum Jordan kam, BWV 7, for St. John's Day (24 John 1724), a recitative referring to the command to baptise is set as an expressive arioso, accompanied by strings, similar to the words of Jesus in Bach's St Matthew Passion.
  - In Jesu, der du meine Seele, BWV 78, (10 September 1724) a bass recitative is accompanied by strings, Die Wunden, Nägel, Kron und Grab ("The wounds, nails, crown and grave"), reminiscent of the vox Christi in Bach's St. Matthew Passion.
- In other cantatas of the second cycle:
  - In the first movement of Ich bin ein guter Hirt, BWV 85, (15 April 1725), the bass sings "I am a good shepherd" from the Gospel.
  - In the unusual first movement of Ihr werdet weinen und heulen, BWV 103, (22 April 1725), Bach inserted an almost operatic recitative of Jesus in the fugal choral singing.
  - In the first movement of Es ist euch gut, daß ich hingehe, BWV 108, (29 April 1725), the bass sings a quote from the Gospel, "It is good for you that I leave".
  - Jesus speaks twice in Bisher habt ihr nichts gebeten in meinem Namen, BWV 87, (6 May 1725), in movement 1 accompanied by strings, doubled by oboes, in movement 5 accompanied by the continuo: "In the world you have fear; however be comforted, I have conquered the world."
  - In the first movement of Sie werden euch in den Bann tun, BWV 183, (13 May 1725), the announcement of Jesus from the second Farewell Discourse is set as a recitative of only five measures, accompanied by long chords of the four oboes, two oboi da caccia and two oboi d'amore on a pedal point of the continuo, creating a "sepulchral" sound.

The last four of these were on a libretto by Christiana Mariana von Ziegler

From Bach's third cantata cycle (1725–1726):

- Selig ist der Mann, BWV 57, (26 December 1725) is a dialogue of the Anima and Jesus.
- The central movement of Brich dem Hungrigen dein Brot, BWV 39, (23 June 1726) is a line from the Epistle to the Hebrews 13:16, Wohlzutun und mitzuteilen vergesset nicht ("To do good and to share, forget no"). Bach treats it, as if Jesus said the words himself, between arioso and aria.
- In Siehe, ich will viel Fischer aussenden, BWV 88 (21 July 1726, 5th Sunday after Trinity), the Evangelist begins part 2 with a recitative on Luke 5:10, "Jesus sprach zu Simon" (Jesus said to Simon), the following direct speech of Jesus, calling Peter as his disciple, is sung by the bass: "Fürchte dich nicht; den von nun an wirst du Menschen fahen" (Fear not, from henceforth thou shalt catch men).
- In the central movement of Es ist dir gesagt, Mensch, was gut ist, BWV 45, (11. August 1726) beginning Part II, the voice of Christ appears in a "highly virtuosic aria, half Vivaldian concerto, half operatic scena", according to John Eliot Gardiner.
- The central movement of Es wartet alles auf dich, BWV 187, (4 August 1726) is Darum sollt ihr nicht sorgen ("Therefore do not be anxious") from the Sermon on the Mount. The words of Jesus are sung by the bass, accompanied by the violins in unison and the continuo, which also takes part in their motifs.
- In Herr, deine Augen sehen nach dem Glauben, BWV 102, (25 August 1726) Bach himself marked movement 4 for bass Arioso on words from the Epistle to the Romans 2:4—5, Verachtest du den Reichtum seiner Gnade ("Do you scorn the riches of His mercy").
- In Ich geh und suche mit Verlangen, BWV 49, (3 November 1726), a cantata for soprano and bass soloists which is termed a Dialogus between the Bride (the Soul) and the Bridegroom (Jesus), the soprano is the Bride and the bass, the vox Christi, is the Bridegroom.

Later additions to the chorale cantata cycle:

- In Wachet auf, ruft uns die Stimme, BWV 140, (25 November 1731) Jesus "appears" with the "Soul" in movement 3, a duet for soprano and bass, Wann kommst du, mein Heil? ("When will you come, my salvation?").
- In Es ist das Heil uns kommen her, BWV 9 (composed between 1732 and 1735), three bass recitatives based on stanzas of the chorale can be considered a sermon on the Lutheran creed, based on the Sermon on the Mount.

In one of the other late church cantatas by Johann Sebastian Bach:

- In Schwingt freudig euch empor, BWV 36, (2 December 1731) in the bass aria beginning part II, "Willkommen, werter Schatz!" (Welcome, worthy treasure!) the bass voice is the vox Christi, addressing the bride.

== Vox Christi performers ==
Some basses and baritones are especially known for singing the words of Jesus in Bach's Passions, including:

- Dietrich Fischer-Dieskau
- Kieth Engen
- Franz Kelch
- Max van Egmond
- Klaus Mertens
- Peter Kooy
- Konrad Jarnot
