= Bach's first cantata cycle =

Cantatas by Johann Sebastian Bach

Bach's first cantata cycle refers to the church cantatas Johann Sebastian Bach composed for the somewhat less than 60 occasions of the liturgical year of his first year as Thomaskantor in Leipzig which required concerted music. That year ran from the first Sunday after Trinity in 1723 to Trinity Sunday of the next year:

== List ==
=== 1723 ===
1. Trinity I, 30 May 1723: Die Elenden sollen essen, BWV 75
2. Trinity II, 6 June 1723: Die Himmel erzählen die Ehre Gottes, BWV 76
3. Trinity III, 13 June 1723: Weimar cantata Ich hatte viel Bekümmernis, BWV 21 restaged (third version in C minor)
4. Trinity IV, 20 June 1723: Ein ungefärbt Gemüte, BWV 24, and Weimar cantata Barmherziges Herze der ewigen Liebe, BWV 185 restaged
5. Nativity of St. John the Baptist, 24 June 1723: Ihr Menschen, rühmet Gottes Liebe, BWV 167
6. Trinity V, 27 June 1723: no extant cantata
7. Visitation, 2 July 1723: Herz und Mund und Tat und Leben, BWV 147 (adaptation of BWV 147a, a Weimar cantata for Advent IV) and possibly Magnificat in E-flat major, BWV 243a (early version without Christmas interpolations)
8. Trinity VI, 4 July 1723: no extant cantata
9. Trinity VII, 11 July 1723: Ärgre dich, o Seele, nicht, BWV 186 (adapted from BWV 186a, a Weimar cantata for Advent III)
10. Trinity VIII, 18 July 1723: Erforsche mich, Gott, und erfahre mein Herz, BWV 136
11. Trinity IX, 25 July 1723: Herr, gehe nicht ins Gericht mit deinem Knecht, BWV 105
12. Trinity X, 1 August 1723: Schauet doch und sehet, ob irgend ein Schmerz sei, BWV 46
13. Trinity XI, 8 August 1723: Siehe zu, daß deine Gottesfurcht nicht Heuchelei sei, BWV 179 and Weimar cantata Mein Herze schwimmt im Blut, BWV 199 restaged (Leipzig version in D minor)
14. Trinity XII, 15 August 1723: Lobe den Herrn, meine Seele, BWV 69a
15. Trinity XIII, 22 August 1723: Du sollt Gott, deinen Herren, lieben, BWV 77
16. Trinity XIV, 29 August 1723: Es ist nichts Gesundes an meinem Leibe, BWV 25
17. (30 August 1723, Ratswechsel: not part of the liturgical year, see below)
18. Trinity XV, 5 September 1723: Warum betrübst du dich, mein Herz, BWV 138
19. Trinity XVI, 12 September 1723: Christus, der ist mein Leben, BWV 95
20. Trinity XVII, 19 September 1723: Bringet dem Herrn Ehre seines Namens, BWV 148
21. Trinity XVIII, 26 September 1723: no extant cantata
22. St. Michael's Day, 29 September 1723: no extant cantata
23. Trinity XIX, 3 October 1723: Ich elender Mensch, wer wird mich erlösen, BWV BWV 48
24. Trinity XX, 10 October 1723: Weimar cantata Ach! ich sehe, itzt, da ich zur Hochzeit gehe, BWV 162 restaged
25. Trinity XXI, 17 October 1723: Ich glaube, lieber Herr, hilf meinem Unglauben, BWV 109
26. Trinity XXII, 24 October 1723: Was soll ich aus dir machen, Ephraim, BWV 89
27. Reformation Day, 31 October 1723 (coinciding with Trinity XXIII): possibly Weimar cantata Nur jedem das Seine, BWV 163 restaged; Alternatively an early version of BWV 80/80b?
28. Trinity XXIV, 7 November 1723: O Ewigkeit, du Donnerwort, BWV 60
29. Trinity XXV, 14 November 1723: Es reißet euch ein schrecklich Ende, BWV 90
30. Trinity XXVI, 21 November 1723: Wachet! betet! betet! wachet! BWV 70 (adapted from a Weimar Advent II cantata)
31. Advent I, 28 November 1723: Weimar cantata Nun komm, der Heiden Heiland, BWV 61 restaged
32. Christmas, 25 December 1723: Weimar cantata Christen, ätzet diesen Tag, BWV 63 restaged; Also Magnificat, BWV 243a (including Christmas interpolations) and Sanctus in D major, BWV 238
33. Second Day of Christmas, 26 December 1723: Darzu ist erschienen der Sohn Gottes, BWV 40
34. Third Day of Christmas, 27 December 1723: Sehet, welch eine Liebe hat uns der Vater erzeiget, BWV 64

=== 1724 ===
35. New Year, 1 January 1724: Singet dem Herrn ein neues Lied, BWV 190 (instrumental parts lost)
36. Sunday after New Year, 2 January 1724: Schau, lieber Gott, wie meine Feind, BWV 153
37. Epiphany, 6 January 1724: Sie werden aus Saba alle kommen, BWV 65
38. Epiphany I, 9 January 1724: Mein liebster Jesus ist verloren, BWV 154
39. Epiphany II, 16 January 1724: Weimar cantata Mein Gott, wie lang, ach lange? BWV 155 restaged
40. Epiphany III, 23 January 1724: Herr, wie du willt, so schicks mit mir, BWV 73
41. Epiphany IV, 30 January 1724: Jesus schläft, was soll ich hoffen? BWV 81
42. Purification, 2 February 1724: Erfreute Zeit im neuen Bunde, BWV 83
43. Septuagesima, 6 February 1724: Nimm, was dein ist, und gehe hin, BWV 144
44. Sexagesima, 13 February 1724: Leichtgesinnte Flattergeister, BWV 181 and Weimar cantata Gleichwie der Regen und Schnee vom Himmel fällt, BWV 18 restaged in its Leipzig version (A minor, Kammerton)
45. Estomihi, 7 February 1723 (Leipzig audition for the post as Thomaskantor) and 20 February 1724 (first cycle): Jesus nahm zu sich die Zwölfe, BWV 22 and Du wahrer Gott und Davids Sohn, BWV 23 restaged in its first Leipzig version (B minor, four movements)
46. Annunciation and Palm Sunday 25 March 1724: Siehe eine Jungfrau ist schwanger, BWV 1135 (previously BWV Anh. 199; music lost) and Weimar cantata Himmelskönig, sei willkommen, BWV 182 restaged.
47. (Good Friday, 7 April 1724: St John Passion, BWV 245, 1st version — Passion, not considered as a cantata part of the cycle)
48. Easter, 9 April 1724: early cantata Christ lag in Todes Banden, BWV 4 restaged (Leipzig version); Weimar cantata Der Himmel lacht! Die Erde jubilieret, BWV 31 restaged (Leipzig version)
49. Easter Monday, 10 April 1724: Erfreut euch, ihr Herzen, BWV 66
50. Easter Tuesday, 11 April 1724: Ein Herz, das seinen Jesum lebend weiß, BWV 134
51. Quasimodogeniti, 16 April 1724: Halt im Gedächtnis Jesum Christ, BWV 67
52. Misericordias Domini, 23 April 1724: Du Hirte Israel, höre, BWV 104
53. Jubilate, 30 April 1724: Weimar cantate Weinen, Klagen, Sorgen, Zagen, BWV 12 restaged in a version with a slightly modified instrumentation
54. Cantate, 7 May 1724: Wo gehest du hin? BWV 166
55. Rogate, 14 May 1724: Wahrlich, wahrlich, ich sage euch, BWV BWV 86
56. Ascension, 18 May 1724: Wer da gläubet und getauft wird, BWV 37
57. Exaudi, 21 May 1724: Sie werden euch in den Bann tun, BWV 44
58. Pentecost, 28 May 1724: Wer mich liebet, der wird mein Wort halten, BWV 59 and Weimar cantata Erschallet, ihr Lieder, erklinget, ihr Saiten! BWV 172 restaged in its first Leipzig version (D major)
59. Pentecost Monday, 29 May 1724: no extant cantata
60. Pentecost Tuesday, 30 May 1724: Erwünschtes Freudenlicht, BWV 184
61. Trinity, 4 June 1724: Höchsterwünschtes Freudenfest, BWV 194, originally a consecration cantata (2 November 1723), restaged in its first Leipzig version

Not a part of the liturgical year:

1. New council (Ratswechsel), 30 August 17: Preise, Jerusalem, den Herrn, BWV 119

Church cantatas by Johann Sebastian Bach by chronology
Preceded by Köthen: Lobet den Herrn, alle seine Heerscharen, BWV Anh. 5	Bach's first cantata cycle 1723–24	Succeeded by Bach's second cantata cycle
