= Sie werden euch in den Bann tun, BWV 183 =

Church cantata by Johann Sebastian Bach

Sie werden euch in den Bann tun
- BWV 183
- Church cantata by J. S. Bach
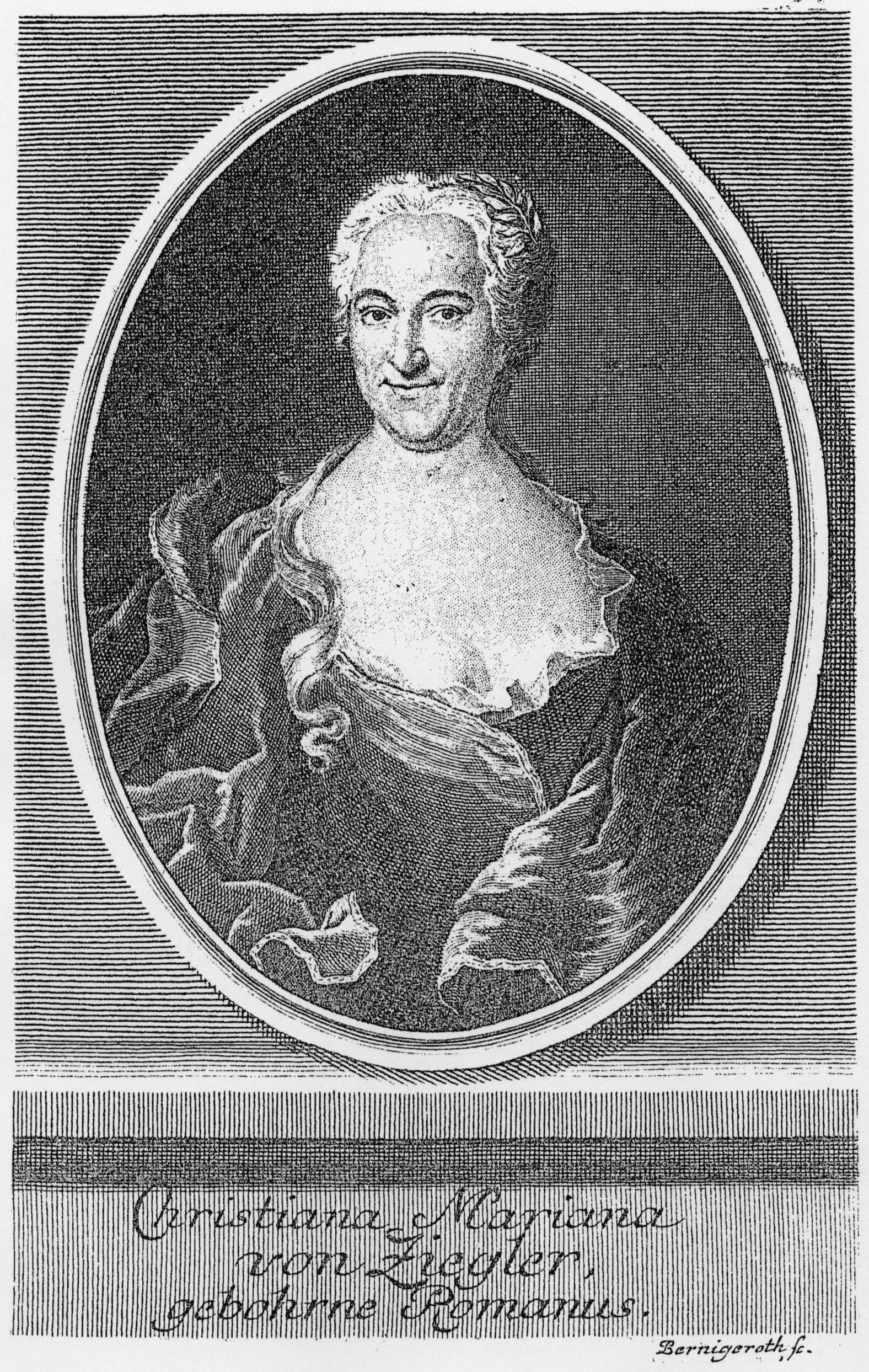
- Christiana Mariana von Ziegler, author of the cantata text
- Occasion: Exaudi
- Cantata text: Christiana Mariana von Ziegler
- Bible text: John 16:2
- Chorale: by Paul Gerhardt
- Performed: 13 May 1725: Leipzig
- Movements: 5
- Vocal: SATB soloists and choir
- Instrumental: 2 oboes d'amore; 2 oboes da caccia; 2 violins; viola; violoncello piccolo; continuo

Sie werden euch in den Bann tun (They will put you under banishment), BWV 183, (Note: "BWV" is Bach-Werke-Verzeichnis, a thematic catalogue of Bach's works.) is a church cantata by Johann Sebastian Bach. He composed it in Leipzig for Exaudi, the Sunday after Ascension, and first performed it on 13 May 1725.

It is the fifth of nine cantatas on texts by Christiana Mariana von Ziegler, with whom Bach collaborated at the end of his second cantata cycle. It begins with quote from the Gospel, set for the bass as the vox Christi. For a closing chorale she used a stanza of Paul Gerhardt's "Zeuch ein zu deinen Toren". The theme of the cantata is the reaction of the believer to the announcement of hardship and the hope for the assistance of the promised Holy Spirit. Bach scored the cantata for four vocal soloists (soprano, alto, tenor and bass), a four-part choir and a Baroque instrumental ensemble of two oboes d'amore, two oboes da caccia, a violoncello piccolo, strings and basso continuo. Unusually, all four oboes play together in two recitatives.

== History and words ==
Bach wrote the cantata in his second year in Leipzig for the Sunday Exaudi, the Sunday after Ascension. The prescribed readings for the feast day were from the First Epistle of Peter, "serve each other" (1 Peter 4:8–11), and from the second Farewell Discourse in the Gospel of John, the promise of the Paraclete, the "Spirit of Truth", and the announcement of prosecution (John 15:26–16:4).

Some of the cantatas composed by Bach in his second year were chorale cantatas, a format he chose for services between the first Sunday after Trinity and Palm Sunday. For Easter he had returned to cantatas on more varied texts. Nine of the cantatas for the period between Easter and Pentecost are based on texts of Christiana Mariana von Ziegler, including this cantata. Bach later assigned it to his third annual cycle.

Ziegler begins the cantata with the same quotation from the Gospel as an unknown poet one year earlier in Sie werden euch in den Bann tun, BWV 44, the prediction of persecution of Christians. "They will put you under banishment, but the time will come, when, whoever kills you will think that he does God a service by it" (John 16:2). She continues stressing the lack of fear possible for a follower who relies on "Jesu Schutzarm" (the protective arm of Jesus). In movements 3 and 4 she refers to the beginning of the Gospel, the spirit who will assist. The closing chorale is the fifth stanza of Paul Gerhardt's "Zeuch ein zu deinen Toren".

Bach first performed the cantata on 13 May 1725.

== Structure and scoring ==
Bach structured the cantata in five movements, beginning with what Gardiner describes as a "curtain raiser", a line from the gospel set as a recitative. This is followed by a sequence aria–recitative–aria, and the cantata is concluded by a four-part chorale. Bach scored the work for four vocal soloists (soprano, alto, tenor and bass), a four-part choir only in the closing chorale, and a Baroque instrumental ensemble in an unusual combination of instruments, two oboes d'amore (Oa), two oboes da caccia (Oc), two violins (Vl), viola (Va), a violoncello piccolo (Vp) and basso continuo.

In the following table of the movements, the scoring follows the Neue Bach-Ausgabe. The continuo, playing throughout, is not shown.

Movements of Sie werden euch in den Bann tun
No.	Title	Text	Type	Vocal	Winds	Strings	Key	Time
1	Sie werden euch in den Bann tun	Ziegler	Recitative	B	2Oa 2Oc			3/4
2	Ich fürchte nicht des Todes Schrecken	Ziegler	Aria	T			E minor	
3	Ich bin bereit, mein Blut und armes Leben	Ziegler	Recitative	A	2Oa 2Oc	2Vl Va		common time
4	Höchster Tröster, heilger Geist	Ziegler	Aria	S	2Oc	2Vl Va	C major	3/8
5	Du bist ein Geist, der lehret	Gerhardt	Chorale	SATB	2Oa 2Oc	2Vl Va		common time

== Music ==
In the first movement the words of Jesus are given to the bass, the voice type which by convention was the vox Christi (voice of Christ). A year earlier (in Sie werden euch in den Bann tun, BWV 44), Bach rendered the announcement of Jesus in a two-part movement, a duet for bass and tenor followed by an agitated chorus. In this cantata, he set it as a recitative of only five measures. The instrumentation is novel, having long chords of the four oboes, two oboes da caccia and two oboes d'amore, accompany the voice above a pedal point held by the continuo which creates a "sepulchral" sound, according to Julian Mincham. The Bach scholar Christoph Wolff notes that this "opulent oboe scoring" with all four oboes playing together is used only in the two recitatives (1 and 3).

The second movement, the first aria, is the longest of the work. It is sung by the tenor with an obbligato part for violoncello piccolo, an instrument with a tenor-bass range. The "dark and shaded" timbre of the movement has been seen as representing the protection provided by Christ. Denying the fear of the threatening death, the violoncello piccolo plays continuous runs.

Movement 3 is again a recitativo accompagnato, even more complex than the first one; the strings play long chords, whereas all the oboes repeat the same four-note motif throughout the movement, sung by the alto on the words "Ich bin bereit" (I am ready).

The second aria is accompanied by the strings and the two oboes da caccia in unison as obbligato instruments, thus both arias are dominated by instruments with a relatively low range (oboes de caccia having a pitch below that of a normal oboe). The opening line appears three times, set similarly but not identically, which can be interpreted as a symbol of the Trinity.

The cantata is closed by a four-part chorale on the tune of "Helft mir Gotts Güte preisen" by Johann Crüger.

== Publication ==
Ziegler published the text in a collection of her work, along with the other ones set by Bach. These printed versions are slightly different from the texts used in the cantatas, and this is believed to be the result of the composer modifying the libretti with which he was presented. (Note: Among the authors who assume that Bach modified the libretti himself are Nele Anders in the introduction (1988) to volume 10 of the Teldec complete set, and John Eliot Gardiner in his 2013 book Bach: Music in the Castle of Heaven. Allen Lane.) In the case of Sie werden euch in den Bann tun the differences between the printed version and that set by Bach are less than in the preceding cantatas such as Auf Christi Himmelfahrt allein, BWV 128.

The autograph score was inherited by C.P.E. Bach. It is extant as well as a set of parts. The music was not published until 1860 when it appeared as part of the first complete edition of the composer's work, the Bach-Gesellschaft-Ausgabe. The editor of the volume in question was Wilhelm Rust. In the Neue Bach-Ausgabe, it appeared in 1960, edited by Dürr.

== Recordings ==
The selection is taken from the listing on the Bach Cantatas Website. Choirs with one voice per part (OVPP) and orchestras playing period instruments in historically informed performances are marked green.

Recordings of Sie werden euch in den Bann tun
Title	Conductor / Choir / Orchestra	Soloists	Label	Year	Orch. type
Die Bach Kantate Vol. 36	Helmuth Rilling Gächinger Kantorei Bach-Collegium Stuttgart	Arleen Augér; Julia Hamari; Peter Schreier; Walter Heldwein	Hänssler	1981	
J. S. Bach: Das Kantatenwerk – Sacred Cantatas Vol. 10	Nikolaus Harnoncourt Tölzer Knabenchor Concentus Musicus Wien	Helmet Wittek (Soloist of the Tölzer Knabenchor); Paul Esswood; Kurt Equiluz; Thomas Hampson	Teldec	1988	Period
J. S. Bach: Cantatas with Violoncelle Piccolo (Vol. 2)	Christophe Coin Das Leipziger Concerto Vocale Ensemble Baroque de Limoges	Soloist of the Knabenchor Hannover; Barbara Schlick; Andreas Scholl; Christoph Prégardien; Gotthold Schwarz	Auvidis Astrée	1994	Period
Bach J. S: Cantatas Vol 25: Dresden/Sherborne	John Eliot Gardiner Monteverdi Choir English Baroque Soloists	Joanne Lunn; Daniel Taylor; Paul Agnew; Panajotis Iconomou	Soli Deo Gloria	2000	Period
J. S. Bach: Complete Cantatas Vol. 15	Ton Koopman Amsterdam Baroque Orchestra & Choir	Deborah York; Bogna Bartosz; Jörg Dürmüller; Klaus Mertens	Antoine Marchand	2001	Period
J. S. Bach: Cantatas Vol. 391	Masaaki Suzuki Bach Collegium Japan	Carolyn Sampson; Robin Blaze; Gerd Türk; Peter Kooy	BIS	2007	Period
