= Chorale cantata cycle =

Set of compositions by J. S. Bach

Johann Sebastian Bach's chorale cantata cycle is the year-cycle of church cantatas he started composing in Leipzig from the first Sunday after Trinity in 1724. It followed the cantata cycle he had composed from his appointment as Thomaskantor after Trinity in 1723.

Bach's second cantata cycle is commonly used as a synonym for his chorale cantata cycle, but strictly speaking both cycles overlap only for 40 cantatas. Two further chorale cantatas may belong to both cycles: the final version of Christ lag in Todes Banden, BWV 4, and the earliest version of Ein feste Burg ist unser Gott, BWV 80; it is, however, uncertain whether these versions were first presented in Bach's second year in Leipzig. Bach composed a further 13 cantatas in his second year at Leipzig, none of them chorale cantatas, although two of them became associated with the chorale cantata cycle. After his second year in Leipzig, he composed at least eight further cantatas for inclusion in his chorale cantata cycle.

Around the start of the Bach Revival in the 19th century, almost no manuscripts of Bach's music remained in St. Thomas in Leipzig, apart from an incomplete chorale cantata cycle. In Leipzig the chorale cantatas were, after the motets, the second most often performed compositions of Bach between the composer's death and the Bach Revival. Philipp Spitta, in his 19th-century biography of the composer, praised the chorale cantatas, but failed to see them as a cycle tied to 1724–25. It took about a century after Spitta before Bach's cantata cycles were analysed in scholarly literature, but then Bach's ambitious project to write a chorale cantata for each occasion of the liturgical year was characterized as "the largest musical project that the composer ever undertook".

== Development of the second cantata cycle and the chorale cantata cycle ==
Possibly the idea for writing a series of chorale cantatas was inspired by the bicentennial anniversary of the first publications of Lutheran hymnals (1524). The first of these early hymnals is the Achtliederbuch, containing eight hymns and five melodies. Four chorale cantatas use text and/or melody of a hymn in that early publication (BWV 2, 9, 38 and 117). Another 1524 hymnal is the Erfurt Enchiridion: BWV 62, 91, 96, 114, 121 and 178 are based on hymns from that publication. BWV 14 and 125 were based on hymns from Eyn geystlich Gesangk Buchleyn, also published in 1524.

Apart from some cantatas composed after Palm Sunday 1725, the chorale cantata cycle and the second cantata cycle overlap, and the two designations are often used interchangeably in scholarly literature. Otherwise the cycle is described as breaking off after Palm Sunday or Easter 1725. There are some cantatas that belong to one of both cycles, but not to the other, for instance the chorale cantata for Trinity 1727 replaces the Trinity cantata of the second cycle composed in 1725. Also, some cantatas traditionally seen as belonging to the chorale cantata cycle are not chorale cantatas in a strict sense, for instance the cantata for the Sunday between New Year and Epiphany added to the chorale cantata cycle in 1727. Neither the second cantata cycle, nor the chorale cantata cycle are complete annual cycles as extant. Even a merging of both cycles into one, with some occasions having two cantatas, which hardly can be seen as an intention of the composer, would still be missing a few cantatas (e.g. for Easter 3 and Trinity XXVI).

=== Chorale cantatas composed as part of the second annual cycle (Trinity I 1724 to Palm Sunday 1725) ===
All extant church cantatas Bach composed for occasions from 11 June 1724 (Trinity I) to 25 March 1725 (Palm Sunday) are chorale cantatas. As such these cantatas have consecutive "K" numbers in the chronological Zwang catalogue for Bach's cantatas published in 1982. In the Zwang catalogue the cantata for Reformation Day Ein feste Burg ist unser Gott, BWV 80, is inserted between the cantatas for Trinity XXI and XII, as a cantata premiered in 1724. More recently, this cantata is, however, no longer considered to have been composed in 1724.

Bach's last newly composed chorale cantata in his second year in Leipzig was Wie schön leuchtet der Morgenstern, BWV 1, for the feast of the Annunciation on 25 March, which fell on Palm Sunday in 1725. Of the chorale cantatas composed up to Palm Sunday 1725 only K 77, 84, 89, 95, 96 and 109 (BWV 135, 113, 130, 80, 115 and 111) were not included in the chorale cantata cycle that was still extant in Leipzig in 1830.

==== Sundays after Trinity ====
In 1724 the period of the Sundays after Trinity included St. John's Day (24 June), Visitation (2 July, that year coinciding with Trinity IV), St. Michael's Day (29 September) and Reformation Day (31 October). That year the last Sunday after Trinity, that is the last Sunday before Advent, was Trinity XXV:

- Trinity I, 11 June 1724: O Ewigkeit, du Donnerwort, BWV 20 (K 74).
- Trinity II, 18 June 1724: Ach Gott, vom Himmel sieh darein, BWV 2 (K 75).
- St. John's Day, 24 June 1724: Christ unser Herr zum Jordan kam, BWV 7 (K 76).
- Trinity III, 25 June 1724: Ach Herr, mich armen Sünder, BWV 135 (K 77).
- Visitation, 2 July 1724 (that year coinciding with Trinity IV): Meine Seel erhebt den Herren, BWV 10 (K 78).
- Trinity V, 9 July 1724: Wer nur den lieben Gott läßt walten, BWV 93 (K 79).
- Trinity VI (no extant Bach cantata for this Sunday in 1724)
- Trinity VII, 23 July 1724: Was willst du dich betrüben, BWV 107 (K 80).
- Trinity VIII, 30 July 1724: Wo Gott der Herr nicht bei uns hält, BWV 178 (K 81).
- Trinity IX, 6 August 1724: Was frag ich nach der Welt, BWV 94 (K 82).
- Trinity X, 13 August 1724: Nimm von uns, Herr, du treuer Gott, BWV 101 (K 83).
- Trinity XI, 20 August 1724: Herr Jesu Christ, du höchstes Gut, BWV 113 (K 84).
- Trinity XII (no extant Bach cantata for this Sunday in 1724)
- Council election (no extant Bach cantata for this Monday in 1724)
- Trinity XIII, 3 September 1724: Allein zu dir, Herr Jesu Christ, BWV 33 (K 85).
- Trinity XIV, 10 September 1724: Jesu, der du meine Seele, BWV 78 (K 86).
- Trinity XV, 17 September 1724: Was Gott tut, das ist wohlgetan, BWV 99 (K 87).
- Trinity XVI, 24 September 1724: Liebster Gott, wenn werd ich sterben? BWV 8 (K 88).
- St. Michael's Day, 29 September 1724: Herr Gott, dich loben alle wir, BWV 130 (K 89).
- Trinity XVII, 1 October 1724: Ach, lieben Christen, seid getrost, BWV 114 (K 90).
- Trinity XVIII, 8 October 1724: Herr Christ, der einge Gottessohn, BWV 96 (K 91).
- Trinity XIX, 15 October 1724: Wo soll ich fliehen hin, BWV 5 (K 92).
- Trinity XX, 22 October 1724: Schmücke dich, o liebe Seele, BWV 180 (K 93).
- Trinity XXI, 29 October 1724: Aus tiefer Not schrei ich zu dir, BWV 38 (K 94).
- Reformation Day: Ein feste Burg ist unser Gott, BWV 80 (K 95) – there is however uncertainty whether an early version of this cantata was composed for, or even performed at, 31 October 1724.
- Trinity XXII, 5 November 1724: Mache dich, mein Geist, bereit, BWV 115 (K 96).
- Trinity XXIII, 12 November 1724: Wohl dem, der sich auf seinen Gott, BWV 139 (K 97).
- Trinity XXIV, 19 November 1724: Ach wie flüchtig, ach wie nichtig, BWV 26 (K 98).
- Trinity XXV, 26 November 1724: Du Friedefürst, Herr Jesu Christ, BWV 116 (K 99).

==== Advent 1724 to Epiphany 1725 ====
	Occasion	Second cantata cycle	Chorale cantata cycle
1	Advent I	BWV 62	
2	Christmas	BWV 91	
3	Christmas 2	BWV 121	
4	Christmas 3	BWV 133	
5	Christmas I	BWV 122	
6	New Year	BWV 41	
7	New Year I	—	(BWV 58)
8	Epiphany	BWV 123	
9	Epiphany I	BWV 124	
10	Epiphany II	BWV 3	
11	Epiphany III	BWV 111	
12	Epiphany IV	—	BWV 14
13	Epiphany V	—	
14	Epiphany VI	—	
15	Septuagesima	BWV 92	
16	Purification	BWV 125	
17	Sexagesima	BWV 126	
18	Estomihi	BWV 127	
19	Annunciation; Palm Sunday	BWV 1	
20	Easter	(BWV 4) (BWV 249)	BWV 4
21	Easter 2	BWV 6	—
22	Easter 3	(BWV 158?)	—
23	Easter I	BWV 42	—
24	Easter II	BWV 85	BWV 112
25	Easter III	BWV 103	—
26	Easter IV	BWV 108	—
27	Easter V	BWV 87	—
28	Ascension	BWV 128	(BWV 128)
29	Ascension I	BWV 183	—
30	Pentecost	BWV 74	—
31	Pentecost 2	BWV 68	(BWV 68)
32	Pentecost 3	BWV 175	—
33	Trinity	BWV 176	BWV 129
34	Trinity I	BWV 20	
35	Trinity II	BWV 2	
36	St. John's D.	BWV 7	
37	Trinity III	BWV 135	
38	Trinity IV	—	BWV 177
39	Visitation	BWV 10	
40	Trinity V	BWV 93	
41	Trinity VI	—	BWV 9
42	Trinity VII	BWV 107	
43	Trinity VIII	BWV 178	
44	Trinity IX	BWV 94	
45	Trinity X	BWV 101	
46	Trinity XI	BWV 113	
47	Trinity XII	—	BWV 137
48	Trinity XIII	BWV 33	
49	Trinity XIV	BWV 78	
50	Trinity XV	BWV 99	
51	Trinity XVI	BWV 8	
52	St. Michael's D.	BWV 130	
53	Trinity XVII	BWV 114	
54	Trinity XVIII	BWV 96	
55	Trinity XIX	BWV 5	
56	Trinity XX	BWV 180	
57	Trinity XXI	BWV 38	
58	Reformation D.	(BWV 80b)	BWV 80
59	Trinity XXII	BWV 115	
60	Trinity XXIII	BWV 139	
61	Trinity XXIV	BWV 26	
62	Trinity XXV	BWV 116	
63	Trinity XXVI	—	
64	Trinity XXVII	—	BWV 140

A new liturgical year starts with the first Sunday of Advent: when a cantata cycle is listed without taking the chronology of composition into account, this is where the list starts. The period from Advent 1724 to Epiphany 1725 included Christmas (25 December), New Year (1 January) and Epiphany (6 January):

- First Sunday of Advent (Advent I), 3 December 1724: Nun komm, der Heiden Heiland, BWV 62 (K 100).

In Leipzig concerted music was not allowed for the second to fourth Sunday of Advent (silent time), so the next cantatas in the cycle are those for Christmas:

- Christmas Day (Feast of the Nativity of Christ), 25 December 1724: Gelobet seist du, Jesu Christ, BWV 91 (K 101).
- Second Day of Christmas (Christmas 2), 26 December 1724: Christum wir sollen loben schon, BWV 121 (K 102).
- Third Day of Christmas (Christmas 3), 27 December 1724: Ich freue mich in dir, BWV 133 (K 103).
- First Sunday after Christmas (Christmas I), 31 December 1724: Das neugeborne Kindelein, BWV 122 (K 104).
- New Year (Feast of the Circumcision of Christ), 1 January 1725: Jesu, nun sei gepreiset, BWV 41 (K 105).

In 1725 the next occasion was Epiphany, while there was no Sunday between New Year and Epiphany:

- Epiphany, 6 January 1725: Liebster Immanuel, Herzog der Frommen, BWV 123 (K 106).

==== Sundays after Epiphany ====
There were six Sundays between Epiphany and Lent in 1725:

- Epiphany I, 7 January 1725: Meinen Jesum laß ich nicht, BWV 124 (K 107).
- Epiphany II, 14 January 1725: Ach Gott, wie manches Herzeleid, BWV 3 (K 108).
- Epiphany III, 21 January 1725: Was mein Gott will, das g'scheh allzeit, BWV 111 (K 109).

The three last Sundays before Ash Wednesday are called Septuagesima, Sexagesima and Estomihi. In 1725 the feast of Purification (2 February) fell between the first and the second of these Sundays:

- Septuagesima, 28 January 1725: Ich hab in Gottes Herz und Sinn, BWV 92 (K 110).
- Purification, 2 February 1725: Mit Fried und Freud ich fahr dahin, BWV 125 (K 111).
- Sexagesima, 4 February 1725: Erhalt uns, Herr, bei deinem Wort, BWV 126 (K 112).
- Estomihi, 11 February 1725: Herr Jesu Christ, wahr' Mensch und Gott, BWV 127 (K 113).

==== Lent up to Palm Sunday ====
In Leipzig there was no music during Lent (starting on Ash Wednesday), except for Annunciation (25 March) and the Passion music on Good Friday. In 1725 Annunciation coincided with Palm Sunday:

- Annunciation — Palm Sunday, 25 March 1725: Wie schön leuchtet der Morgenstern, BWV 1 (K 114).

After this cantata the consecutive set of chorale cantatas breaks off.

=== Continuation of the second annual cycle ===
Newly composed cantatas, to make the year cycle complete up to Trinity Sunday, were no longer in the chorale cantata format, possibly because Bach lost his librettist, likely Andreas Stübel, who died on 31 January 1725.

Only three cantatas staged between Good Friday and Trinity of 1725 became associated with the chorale cantata cycle. Bach's second year cycle of cantatas is complete apart from the cantatas for Christmas II, Epiphany IV–VI, and Trinity IV, VI, XII and XXVI–XXVII. For most of the occasions that lack a cantata in the second cycle there are however extant chorale cantatas.

==== Good Friday and Easter ====
Bach did not present much newly composed music for the Good Friday and Easter services of 1725. The St John Passion, which was a repeat performance of the previous year, now in the St. Thomas church (where Bach had initially attempted to stage its premiere), did, however, contain four new movements (BWV 244/29, 245a, 245b and 245c).

- For Good Friday 30 March 1725 Bach presented the second version of his St John Passion, the only version of that Passion opening with a chorale fantasia (BWV 244/29, based on Sebald Heyden's "O Mensch, bewein dein Sünde groß").

On Easter, 1 April 1725, Bach had two cantatas performed:

- A revised version of the per omnes versus chorale cantata Christ lag in Todes Banden, the first version of which had likely been composed 18 years earlier.
- Kommt, fliehet und eilet, in 1725 indicated as a cantata, is what in later versions would become Bach's Easter Oratorio. It was a parody of a secular cantata he had composed for 23 February 1725: the Shepherd Cantata, possibly his first collaboration with Picander. Probably Picander was also the librettist who provided the parody text for the 1725 Easter cantata.

==== Easter Monday to the second Sunday after Easter ====
There are three extant Bach cantatas premiered in the period from Easter Monday to the second Sunday after Easter 1725. A shared characteristic of these cantatas is their structure: they start with a passage from the bible (vox Christi in the last of these cantatas), followed by an Aria, then a chorale for one or two voices, Recitative, Aria, and a concluding four-part chorale. The librettist of these cantatas is unknown, but is likely the same for all three.

The first Sunday after Easter, Quasimodogeniti, concludes the Octave of Easter, and the next Sunday is called Misericordias Domini:

- Easter Monday (Easter 2), 2 April 1725: Bleib bei uns, denn es will Abend werden, BWV 6. The third movement chorale (soprano soloist) has the first two stanzas of "Ach bleib bei uns, Herr Jesu Christ", by Philipp Melanchthon and Nikolaus Selnecker respectively, as text. The closing chorale is a harmonisation of the second stanza of Luther's "Erhalt uns, Herr, bei deinem Wort".
- Easter Tuesday (Easter 3), 3 April 1725: no extant cantata for this occasion in Bach's second cantata cycle. There's a small chance Der Friede sei mit dir, BWV 158 may have been intended for this occasion in 1725: the time of origin of that possibly incomplete cantata is however very uncertain.
- Quasimodogeniti (Easter I), 8 April 1725: Am Abend aber desselbigen Sabbats, BWV 42. The cantata opens with an instrumental sinfonia. The text of the fourth movement (duet for soprano and tenor) is the first stanza of the chorale "Verzage nicht, o Häuflein klein" (1632) by Jakob Fabricius (theologian) (also attributed to Johann Michael Altenburg). The closing four-part chorale consists of two stanzas added to Martin Luther's "Erhalt uns, Herr, bei deinem Wort": "Verleih uns Frieden gnädiglich", Luther's German version of Da pacem Domine (Give peace, Lord, 1531), and "Gib unsern Fürsten und all'r Obrigkeit" (Give our rulers and all lawgivers), a stanza by Johann Walter paraphrasing 1 Timothy 2:2 (1566), concluded with a final amen.
- Misericordias Domini (Easter II), 15 April 1725: Ich bin ein guter Hirt, BWV 85. The chorale for the third movement (soprano soloist) is the first stanza of Cornelius Becker's hymn "Der Herr ist mein getreuer Hirt" (1598), a paraphrase of Psalm 23. The closing chorale is "Ist Gott mein Schutz und treuer Hirt", the fourth stanza of Ernst Christoph Homberg's hymn "Ist Gott mein Schild und Helfersmann"

None of these cantatas were included in the chorale cantata cycle remaining at St. Thomas in 1830: the Easter II cantata retained in that incomplete cycle was a later composition.

==== Cantatas with a libretto by C. M. von Ziegler: third Sunday after Easter to Trinity 1725 ====
All further second cycle cantatas had Christiana Mariana von Ziegler as librettist. These cantatas are also the only ones for which Bach appears to have collaborated with this librettist. The occasions for which these cantatas were written include Jubilate, Cantate, Rogate, Ascension, Exaudi, Pentecost, and Trinity:

- Jubilate Sunday (Easter III), 22 April 1725: Ihr werdet weinen und heulen, BWV 103
- Cantate Sunday (Easter IV), 29 April 1725: Es ist euch gut, daß ich hingehe, BWV 108
- Rogate Sunday (Easter V), 6 May 1725: Bisher habt ihr nichts gebeten in meinem Namen, BWV 87
- Ascension, 10 May 1725: Auf Christi Himmelfahrt allein, BWV 128
- Exaudi (Ascension I), 13 May 1725: Sie werden euch in den Bann tun, BWV 183
- Pentecost, 20 May 1725: Wer mich liebet, der wird mein Wort halten, BWV 74
- Pentecost Monday (Pentecost 2), 21 May 1725: Also hat Gott die Welt geliebt, BWV 68
- Pentecost Tuesday (Pentecost 3), 22 May 1725: Er rufet seinen Schafen mit Namen, BWV 175
- Trinity, 27 May 1725: Es ist ein trotzig und verzagt Ding, BWV 176

None of the von Ziegler cantatas are chorale cantatas in the strict sense, although the Ascension cantata and the Pentecost Monday cantata open with a chorale fantasia. These two cantatas (BWV 128 and 68) are sometimes associated with the chorale cantata cycle, especially the second one while it was included in the chorale cantata cycle that remained at St. Thomas until the 19th century.

=== Chorale cantatas composed after Trinity 1725 ===
Bach continued to compose chorale cantatas after his second year in Leipzig, at least up to 1735. However, the chorale cantata cycle that survived the 18th century remains an incomplete cycle, primarily missing a few cantatas for the Easter to Trinity period.

==== BWV 80 ====
The chorale cantata for Reformation Day (31 October) Ein feste Burg ist unser Gott, BWV 80, originated in several stages:

- The chorale cantata apparently retained most, if not all, movements of the Alles, was von Gott geboren cantata (BWV 80a), written in Weimar. The libretto of this early version of the BWV 80 cantata survives, but its music is only known from its subsequent versions. BWV 80a is neither a Reformation Day cantata, nor a chorale cantata, but it contains an extract of Luther's "Ein feste Burg ist unser Gott" hymn.
- BWV 80b, a.k.a. the first Leipzig version of the Ein feste Burg ist unser Gott chorale cantata for Reformation Day, is the only version of the cantata of which autograph pages survive: these autograph fragments, which are also the only evidence of this version, ended up in three libraries in two continents, and give a very incomplete picture of the version. Its first performance date is the object of scholarly informed guesses (31 October implied for the below dates):
  - 1723: according to Christoph Wolff (1991). Thus BWV 80 may be the only other chorale cantata, apart from BWV 4, for which an early chorale cantata version preceded Bach's second year in Leipzig. In 1723 Reformation Day coincided with Trinity XXIII: a more conventional view is that in 1723 Bach probably chose for a repeat performance of his 1715 cantata for that occasion (BWV 163).
  - 1724: The 1982 Zwang catalogue places the first performance of BWV 80's early chorale cantata version in 1724. In that case there would be 41 extant chorale cantatas with a first performance in Leipzig between Trinity Sunday 1724 and Easter 1725 (not included). Nonetheless, the chorale cantata qualifier is not entirely correct for the BWV 80 and 80b versions of the cantata, due to the inner movements of these versions largely deriving from a pre-existing libretto elaborating on other topics beside the Lutheran hymn.
  - The third cantata cycle years 1725 (BWV 79), 1726 and 1727 (mourning period without figural music) are usually not seen as possible dates for the first performance of the BWV 80b version.
  - In 1728 Reformation Day again coincided with Trinity XXIII: a Picander libretto for that occasion may have been set by Bach. However, conventional scholarship assigns 1728–1731 as the period during which the BWV 80b version of the cantata was likely performed for the first time.
- Bach's ultimate BWV 80 version originated some time after the 80b version, and was completed before it was copied in the 1740s. As such, this version of the cantata is seen as a later addition to the chorale cantata cycle.
- Two movements of the BWV 80 version known from the BGA edition have an orchestration which the composer's son Wilhelm Friedemann extended with trumpets after his father's death.

==== Occasions without an extant second cycle cantata ====
Bach composed more cantatas for his chorale cantata cycle after Trinity 1725, apparently in an effort to have a complete standard year cycle consisting exclusively of such cantatas:

- Ach Gott, wie manches Herzeleid, BWV 58: cantata for New Year I (= Christmas II). An early version of this cantata, for 5 January 1727, is partially lost. The later extant version, premiered 4 January 1733 or 3 January 1734, was published by the Bach-Gesellschaft in their volume Vol. 12^{2}, p. 133 ff. There had not been a Sunday between New Year and Epiphany in 1725: although the cantata is not completely consistent with the chorale cantata format it was intended as the chorale cantata cycle's New Year I cantata.
- Wär Gott nicht mit uns diese Zeit, BWV 14, composed for Epiphany IV 1735 (there hadn't been an Epiphany IV Sunday in 1725). This is the only chorale cantata of the chorale cantata cycle that was ostensibly composed after 1734, in contrast to Philipp Spitta's assumption in the 19th century that almost all chorale cantatas had been composed after 1734. It is however true that Bach revised some of his chorale cantatas in the last years of his life, and that these are the versions usually published.
- Ich ruf zu dir, Herr Jesu Christ, BWV 177, composed for Trinity IV 1732 (in 1724 Trinity IV had coincided with Visitation)
- Es ist das Heil uns kommen her, BWV 9, an Achtliederbuch chorale cantata, composed for Trinity VI 1732. There is no extant cantata composed for Trinity VI 1724.
- Lobe den Herren, den mächtigen König der Ehren, BWV 137, a per omnes versus chorale cantata, composed for Trinity XII 1725. There is no extant cantata composed for Trinity XII 1724.
- Wachet auf, ruft uns die Stimme, BWV 140, composed for Trinity XXVII 1731: there had not been a Trinity XXVII Sunday in 1724.

All six of these chorale cantatas remained in the chorale cantata cycle kept at St. Thomas.

==== Replacing second cycle cantatas ====
Two chorale cantatas replacing other cantatas composed for occasions between Easter and Trinity 1725 also remained in the St. Thomas collection:

- Der Herr ist mein getreuer Hirt, BWV 112: chorale cantata for Easter II (Misericordias Domini) 1731.
- Gelobet sei der Herr, mein Gott, BWV 129: chorale cantata for Trinity Sunday 1727.

==== Other chorale cantatas ====
There is uncertainty regarding four additional extant chorale cantatas as to time of origin (narrowed down to late 1720s–early 1730s) and occasion, all of them using hymn text without modification, but none of them included in the chorale cantata cycle kept at St. Thomas:

- Sei Lob und Ehr dem höchsten Gut, BWV 117
- Nun danket alle Gott, BWV 192 (incomplete)
- Was Gott tut, das ist wohlgetan, BWV 100
- In allen meinen Taten, BWV 97

Some of these may have been intended for a wedding ceremony and/or as a generic cantata that could be used for any occasion.

== Reception ==
Although we have no account of the reception of Bach's chorale cantatas by the congregation in Leipzig, we know that some of these cantatas were the only works that the city of Leipzig was interested in keeping alive after Bach's death: his successors performed several of them. After Doles, who was Thomaskantor until 1789, the practice of performing Bach cantatas in Leipzig was interrupted until Kantor Müller started to revive some of them from 1803.

Bach's early biographers (his son Carl Philipp Emanuel and Johann Friedrich Agricola in the Nekrolog and Forkel in his 1802 biography) gave little or no attention to individual cantatas, and confined themselves to mentioning that Bach had composed five complete cycles of church cantatas. Scholarship later indicated the chorale cantata cycle as Bach's second cycle of church cantatas. The performance parts of 44 chorale cantatas were about all that was left of Bach's music in the St. Thomas church by 1830. In 1878 Alfred Dörffel described this incomplete cantata cycle in the introduction of the thematic catalogue for the first 120 cantatas published by the Bach Gesellschaft.

Far from seeing a chorale cantata cycle tied to Bach's second year in Leipzig, Philipp Spitta, in the 1880 second volume of his Bach-biography, described the chorale cantata as a genre Bach only converged to in his later years. Like Spitta, Reginald Lane Poole (1882) and Charles Sanford Terry (1920) saw the chorale cantata as a development of the composer's later years, and failed to list more than a handful, let alone a cycle, of such cantatas premiered between Trinity 1724 and Easter 1725 in their chronological lists of Bach's cantatas. Questionable chronologies and minor differences aside, they followed in Spitta's footsteps praising Bach's so-called "later" chorale cantatas as an epitome of the composer's art.

The three editions of the Bach-Werke-Verzeichnis (BWV) that appeared in the second half of the 20th century gave little attention to the cycles of Bach's cantatas: the principles for assigning BWV numbers, as laid down by Wolfgang Schmieder for the catalogue's first edition in 1950, did not result in the chorale cantatas being identifiable as a group or cycle in the catalogue. In the New Bach Edition cantatas were grouped by liturgical function (occasion), so also in that edition the chorale cantatas did not come out as a group or cycle.

In the 21st century Klaus Hofmann has termed the cycle "the largest musical project that the composer ever undertook: the 'chorale cantata year'". The bach-digital.de website, managed by, among others, the Bach Archive, provided the "chorale cantata" qualification for all compositions belonging to this group (all other church cantatas at that website being indicated as sacred cantatas). It is the only cycle of Bach cantatas that is recognisable as a group on that website.

=== 2024/25 ===
The chorale cantatas of Bach's second cycle reach their 300th anniversary in 2024/25. Carus-Verlag published an overview of the occasions, cantatas and their dates in both years, the composition and the year of the anniversary.

Church cantatas by Johann Sebastian Bach by chronology
Preceded by Bach's first cantata cycle	Bach's second cantata cycle 1724–25	Succeeded by Bach's third cantata cycle
