= Nimm von uns, Herr, du treuer Gott, BWV 101 =

Chorale cantata by Johann Sebastian Bach

Nimm von uns, Herr, du treuer Gott
- BWV 101
- Chorale cantata by J. S. Bach
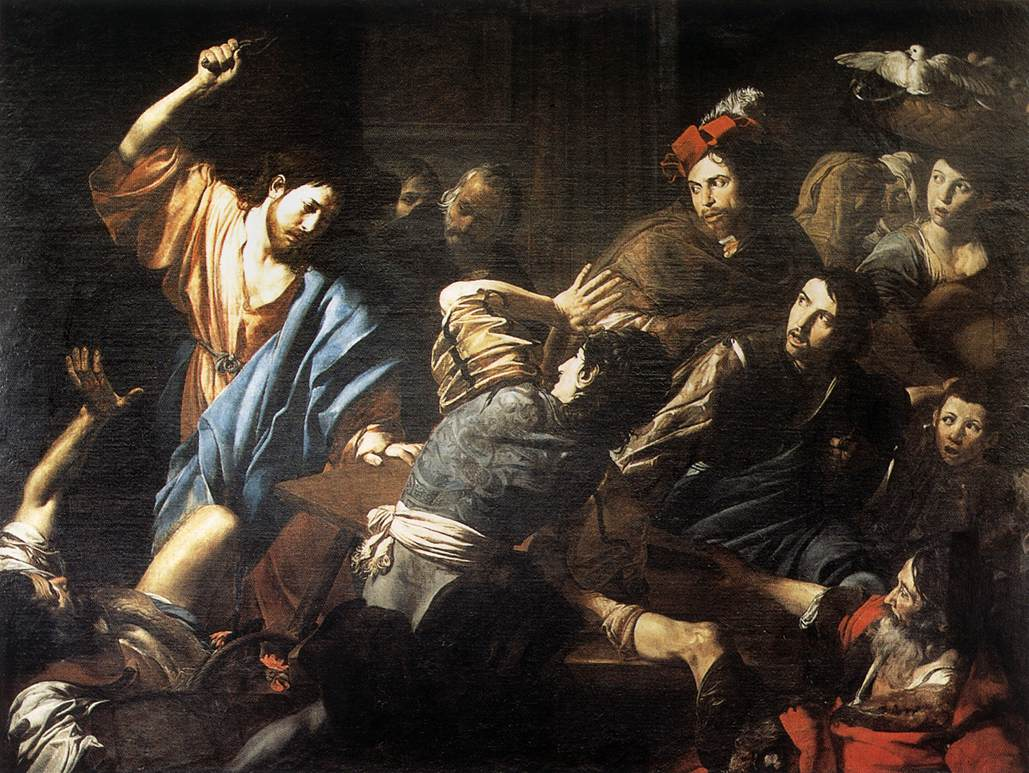
- Christ driving the money changers out of the temple, Valentin de Boulogne, 1618
- Occasion: Tenth Sunday after Trinity
- Chorale: "Nimm von uns, Herr, du treuer Gott" by Martin Moller
- Performed: 13 August 1724: Leipzig
- Duration: 25 minutes
- Movements: 7
- Vocal: SATB choir and solo
- Instrumental: cornett; 3 trombones; 2 oboes; taille; oboe da caccia; flauto traverso; 2 violins; viola; continuo

Johann Sebastian Bach composed the church cantata Nimm von uns, Herr, du treuer Gott (Take away from us, Lord, faithful God), BWV 101, in Leipzig for the tenth Sunday after Trinity and first performed it on 13 August 1724. It is based on the seven stanzas of the hymn of the same name by Martin Moller (1584), which is sung to the tune of "Vater unser im Himmelreich", Luther's metred paraphrase of the Lord's Prayer. The tune is featured prominently in six of the work's seven movements.

Nimm von uns, Herr, du treuer Gott belongs to Bach's chorale cantata cycle, the second cycle during his tenure as Thomaskantor that began in 1723. The text retains the first and last stanza of the chorale unchanged; the text of the third and fifth stanza is retained but interspersed with contemporary lines by an unknown librettist, who also paraphrased stanzas 2, 4 and 6 into aria texts. The first movement is a chorale fantasia, while the middle solo movements alternate arias and recitative. The work is closed by a four-part chorale setting.

The cantata is scored for four vocal soloists, a four-part choir, and a Baroque instrumental ensemble of cornett and trombones to reinforce the voices, oboes, flauto traverso, strings and basso continuo.

== History and words ==
Bach composed the cantata in Leipzig for the Tenth Sunday after Trinity as part of his second cantata cycle. The prescribed readings for the Sunday were from the First Epistle to the Corinthians, different gifts, but one spirit (1 Corinthians 12:1–11), and from the Gospel of Luke, Jesus announcing the destruction of Jerusalem and cleansing of the Temple (Luke 19:41–48).

The cantata is based on the seven stanzas of Martin Moller's chorale (1584), which he had written during a time of plague as a paraphrase of the Latin poem "Aufer immensam" (1541). The chorale is sung on the melody of Luther's "Vater unser im Himmelreich", a paraphrase on the Lord's Prayer. The hymn deals with the "antithesis of God's anger and mercy"; he is asked to lift a sentence as which the plague was seen, as also the destruction of the temple announced in the Gospel.

The chorale text was retained unchanged in the outer movements. An unknown librettist transcribed the ideas of stanzas 2, 4 and 6 to arias. He retained the text of stanzas 3 and 5 but interpolated it by recitative text. The cantata text is only generally related to the readings, unlike Schauet doch und sehet, ob irgend ein Schmerz sei, BWV 46, composed a year earlier and dealing with the lament of Jerusalem in text from Lamentations. The poet hinted at the destruction of Jerusalem by the line "Daß wir nicht durch sündlich Tun wie Jerusalem vergehen!" (so that we might not, through sinful acts, perish like Jerusalem!) in the second movement.

Bach led the Thomanerchor in the cantata's first performance on 13 August 1724. During Bach's tenure as Thomaskantor, it was performed again around 1746, according to changes in the parts. Bach's son, Wilhelm Friedemann Bach, performed it, at least partially, in Halle in the early 1760s.

== Music ==
=== Structure and scoring ===
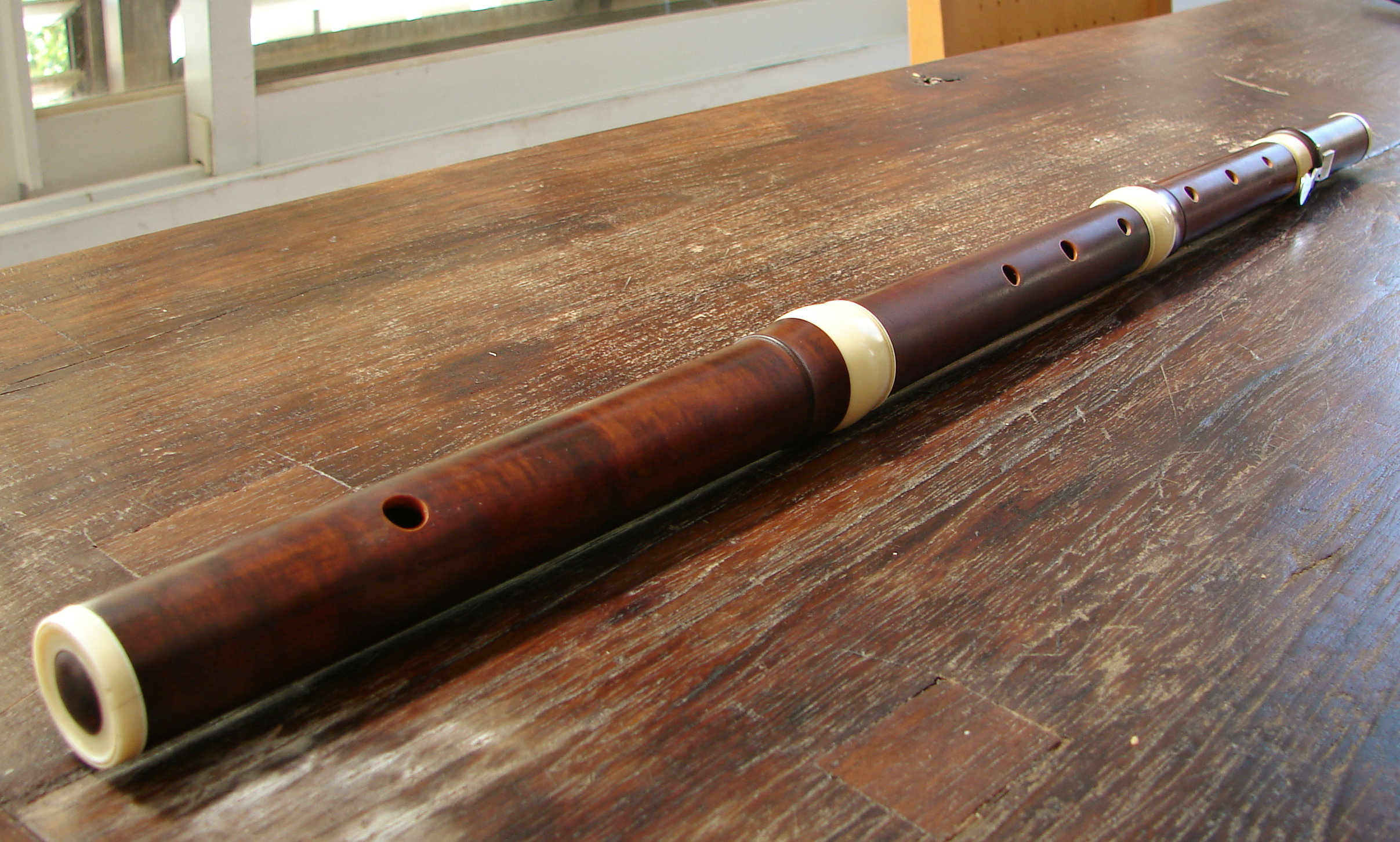
Flauto traverso

Bach structured the cantata in seven movements. Both text and tune of the hymn are retained in the outer movements, a chorale fantasia and a four-part closing chorale. Bach scored the work for four vocal soloists (soprano (S), alto (A), tenor (T) and bass (B)), a four-part choir, and a Baroque instrumental ensemble of cornett (Ct), three trombones (Tb), two oboes (Ob), oboe da caccia (Oc), taille (Ta, a tenor oboe), flauto traverso (Ft, or violin), two violin parts (Vl), one viola part (Va), and basso continuo. The duration of the cantata is given as 25 minutes.

In the following table of the movements, the scoring, keys and time signatures are taken from Alfred Dürr's. The continuo, which plays throughout, is not shown.

Movements of Nimm von uns, Herr, du treuer Gott
No.	Title	Text	Type	Vocal	Winds	Strings	Key	Time
1	Nimm von uns, Herr, du treuer Gott	Moller	Chorale fantasia	SATB	Ct 3Tb 2Ob Ta Ft	2Vl Va	D minor	cut time
2	Handle nicht nach deinen Rechten	anon.	Aria	T	Ft	(or Vl)	G minor	common time
3	Ach! Herr Gott, durch die Treue dein	Moller, anon.	Chorale and recitative	S			G minor	3/4/
4	Warum willst du so zornig sein?	anon.	Aria	B	2Ob Ta		A minor	cut time
5	Die Sünd hat uns verderbet sehr	Moller, anon.	Chorale and recitative	T			D minor	common time
6	Gedenk an Jesu bittern Tod	anon.	Aria	S A	Ft Oc		D minor	12/8
7	Leit uns mit deiner rechten Hand	Moller	Chorale	SATB	Ct 3Tb 2Ob Ta	2Vl Va	D minor	common time

=== Chorale tune ===
The hymn is sung to the tune of "Vater unser im Himmelreich", Luther's metred paraphrase of the Lord's Prayer, which appeared in Valentin Schumann's Gesangbuch of 1539 (Zahn No. 2561).

The melody, in Dorian mode, is a venerated piece of German Protestantism. Perhaps, therefore, Bach used it in different ways in almost all movements.

=== Movements ===
==== 1 ====
The opening chorus, "Nimm von uns, Herr, du treuer Gott, die schwere Straf und große Not," (Take away from us, Lord, faithful God, the heavy punishment and great suffering), is a chorale fantasia with the cantus firmus in the soprano, each line prepared by the lower voices. A choir of trombones plays colla parte with the voices. Oboes and strings play in this movement, different from other more concertante opening movements, motifs that could also be sung, giving prominence to the voices. John Eliot Gardiner, who conducted the Bach Cantata Pilgrimage in 2000, noted that the orchestral motifs were taken from another Luther hymn, "Dies sind die heilgen zehn Gebot" about the Ten Commandments, and described the approach as a "twin-barrelled doctrinal salvo".

For each line of the chorale tune, the lower voices prepared the entrance of the leading soprano by singing this melodic part twice as fast and in imitation; the voices remain in polyphony until the end of the line in the soprano. The voices are reinforced by cornett and trombones, archaic-sounding "as though Bach were intent on reconnecting to Luther's time", as Gardiner observed. Modern aspects, in contrast, are persistent three-note "sighing" motifs in the instruments, and the final "disturbing intensification of harmony and vocal expression for the words 'für Seuchen, Feur und großem Leid' (contagion, fire and grievous pain) at the end of the movement", over a tonic pedal.

==== 2 ====
In the first aria, "Handle nicht nach deinen Rechten mit uns bösen Sündenknechten" (Do not deal with us wicked servants of sin according to your justice), the tenor is accompanied by an obbligato virtuoso flute. The flute writing suggests that Bach had a capable flute player at hand then, as for Was frag ich nach der Welt, BWV 94, performed the previous week. Bach illustrated the text, using for example sigh motifs for "Flehen" (supplication) and a descending line for "vergehen" (perish). Gardiner interpreted the singer as "expressing fear of judgement under the law" while the flute offers "glimmers of hope for grace and pardon". Bach replaced the flute by a violin in a later version.

==== 3 ====
The recitative for the soprano, "Ach! Herr Gott, durch die Treue dein" (Ah! Lord God, through your love), combines the complete third chorale stanza with new text, expanding each single line several by new lines of thoughts, ending with the last chorale line. The chorale lines are sung in an embellished version of the chorale melody, changed to 3/4 time, and accompanied by an ostinato continuo derived from it, while the new text is set as secco recitative.

==== 4 ====
In the central movement is a bass aria in an unusual form. Three oboes and continuo begin with dramatic fury, marked vivace. Then the bass begins unexpectedly, marked andante, with the first line of the chorale stanza on the chorale melody: "Warum willst du so zornig sein?" (Why are you so angry?). On the word "Warum", Bach changes the key abruptly from E minor to C minor in a "calculated spotlit dissonance", according to Gardiner.

The same text is then elaborated in the style of the opening ritornello. In the middle section, again andante, the complete chorale melody is played by the instruments, while the voice sings independently. Shortly before its end, the instruments pick up speed and motifs of the first ritornello and come to a close, without the voice.

==== 5 ====
The second chorale with recitative, for tenor, "Die Sünd hat uns verderbet sehr" (Sin has corrupted us greatly), is similar to the first, but the melody is in common time.

==== 6 ====
The sixth movement, "Gedenk an Jesu bittern Tod" (Think on Jesus' bitter death!) is a duet. The soprano and alto voices are combined with the flute and an oboe da caccia that plays the chorale melody. The music is in siciliano rhythm. The instrumentation is similar to the central movement of Bach's later "Aus Liebe will mein Heiland sterben" from the St Matthew Passion.

==== 7 ====
The final chorale stanza, "Leit uns mit deiner rechten Hand und segne unser Stadt und Land" (Lead us with your right hand and bless our city and land), is set for four parts. The instruments play colla parte with the singers.

== Manuscripts and publication ==
A set of parts for the cantata is preserved, which was partly copied by Bach himself. The cantata was first published in 1876 in the first complete edition of Bach's work, the Bach-Gesellschaft Ausgabe. The volume in question was edited by Wilhelm Rust. In the Neue Bach-Ausgabe it was published in 1985, edited by Robert L. Marshall, with a critical report following in 1989.

== Recordings ==
A list of recordings is provided on the Bach Cantatas Website. Ensembles playing period instruments in historically informed performances are shown with a green background.

Recordings of Nimm von uns, Herr, du treuer Gott
Title	Conductor / Choir / Orchestra	Soloists	Label	Year	Choir type	Orch. type
Die Bach Kantate Vol. 47	Helmuth Rilling Gächinger Kantorei Bach-Collegium Stuttgart	Arleen Augér; Helen Watts; Aldo Baldin; John Bröcheler	Hänssler	1979		
J. S. Bach: Das Kantatenwerk • Complete Cantatas • Les Cantates, Folge / Vol. 6	Nikolaus Harnoncourt Tölzer Knabenchor Concentus Musicus Wien	soloist of the Tölzer Knabenchor; Paul Esswood; Kurt Equiluz; Philippe Huttenlocher	Teldec	1980		Period
J. S. Bach: Complete Cantatas Vol. 10	Ton Koopman Amsterdam Baroque Orchestra & Choir	Caroline Stam; Michael Chance; Paul Agnew; Klaus Mertens	Antoine Marchand	1998		Period
Bach Edition Vol. 20 – Cantatas Vol. 11	Pieter Jan Leusink Holland Boys Choir Netherlands Bach Collegium	Marjon Strijk; Sytse Buwalda; Nico van der Meel; Bas Ramselaar	Brilliant Classics	2000		Period
Bach Cantatas Vol. 5: Rendsburg/Braunschweig	John Eliot Gardiner Monteverdi Choir English Baroque Soloists	Joanne Lunn; Daniel Taylor; Christoph Genz; Gotthold Schwarz	Soli Deo Gloria	2000		Period
J. S. Bach: Cantatas Vol. 31 Cantatas from Leipzig 1724 – BWV 10, 93, 107, 178	Masaaki Suzuki Bach Collegium Japan	Yukari Nonoshita; Robin Blaze; Gerd Türk; Peter Kooy	BIS	2004		Period
