= Ach Gott, wie manches Herzeleid, BWV 3 =

Chorale cantata by Johann Sebastian Bach

Ach Gott, wie manches Herzeleid
- BWV 3
- Chorale cantata by J. S. Bach
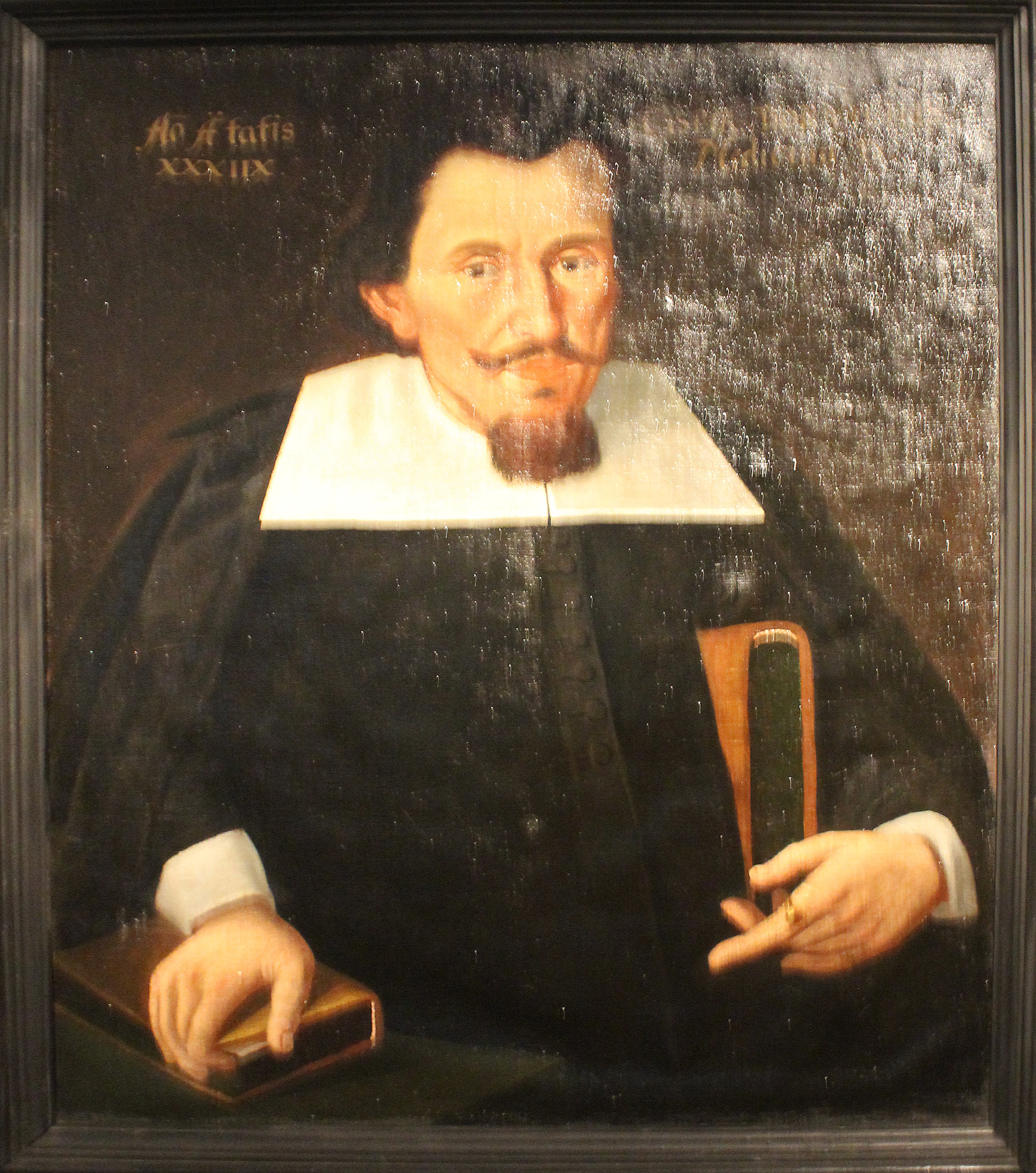
- Portrait of Moller, the hymn writer
- Occasion: Second Sunday after Epiphany
- Chorale: "Ach Gott, wie manches Herzeleid" by Martin Moller
- Performed: 14 January 1725: Leipzig
- Movements: 6
- Vocal: SATB soloists and choir
- Instrumental: horn; trombone; 2 oboes d'amore; 2 violins; viola; continuo

Ach Gott, wie manches Herzeleid (Oh God, how much heartache), BWV 3, is a church cantata by Johann Sebastian Bach. He composed it in Leipzig for the second Sunday after Epiphany and first performed it on 14 January 1725. It is based on the hymn of the same name published by Martin Moller in 1587.

Bach composed the cantata in his second year as Thomaskantor in Leipzig as part of his chorale cantata cycle, for the Second Sunday after Epiphany. The work is based on the hymn "Ach Gott, wie manches Herzeleid" in 18 stanzas, a paraphrase of a medieval model, "Jesu dulcis memoria". This hymn has no evident connection to the prescribed readings but instead a meditation on Jesus as a comforter in distress. In the format of the chorale cantata cycle, an unknown librettist retained only the words of selected stanzas, here the first two and the last for movements 1, 2 and 6, but reworked the ideas of the other stanzas. Similarly, Bach retained the choral melody in three movements, set as a chorale fantasia in the opening chorus with the bass singing the cantus firmus, as a four-part setting with interspersed recitatives in the second movement, and as a four-part setting in the closing chorale. He scored the cantata for four vocal soloists, a four-part choir and a Baroque instrumental ensemble of trombone to reinforce the bass in the opening chorus, horn to support the soprano in the last movement, two oboes d'amore, strings and continuo.

== History, hymn and words ==
Bach composed the cantata in his second year as Thomaskantor in Leipzig as part of his second annual cycle, planned to consist only of chorale cantatas based on Lutheran hymns. He wrote the cantata for the Second Sunday after Epiphany. The prescribed readings for the Sunday were taken from the Epistle to the Romans (we have several gifts – Romans 12:6–16) and from the Wedding at Cana (John 2:1–11).

The cantata is a chorale cantata based on the hymn "Ach Gott, wie manches Herzeleid" in 18 stanzas attributed to Martin Moller (1587). It is a paraphrase of the Latin "Jesu dulcis memoria", a medieval hymn attributed to Bernard of Clairvaux, a meditation on Jesus as a comforter and helper in distress. The unknown librettist retained the words of stanzas 1, 2 and 18 as movements 1, 2 and 6. In movement 2, stanza 2 is expanded by paraphrases of stanzas 3–5, while movement 3 is a paraphrase of stanza 6; movement 4 incorporates ideas from stanzas 7–14, and movement 5 relies on stanzas 15 and 16. In the second movement, the original text is expanded by paraphrases of ideas from stanzas 3 to 5. The third movement is a paraphrase of stanza 6. The fourth movement incorporates ideas from stanzas 7 to 14 while the fifth movement relies on stanzas 15 and 16. The poet did not relate his text to the reading from John 1:2.

Bach led the Thomanerchor in the first performance of the cantata on 14 January 1725.

== Music ==
=== Structure and scoring ===
Bach structured the cantata in six movements. An opening chorus and a closing chorale frame a sequence of alternating recitatives and arias. The first recitative is unusual: the chorus sings one line of the hymn's four lines, continued each time by a soloist in words of the poet. The last aria is a duet. Bach scored the work for four vocal soloists (soprano (S), alto (A), tenor (T), bass (B)), a four-part choir and a Baroque instrumental ensemble of a trombone (Tb) to reinforce the bass in the opening chorus, a horn (Co) to double the cantus firmus in the closing chorale, two oboes d'amore (Oa), two violins (Vl), viola (Va), and basso continuo. The autograph score bears the title: "Dominica 2 post Epiphanias / Ach Gott! Wie manches Hertzeleyd. / à / 4 Voci. / 2 Hautb: d'Amour / 2 Violini / Viola. / e Continuo / di J. S. Bach", which means "Sunday 2 after Epiphany ... for four voices, 2 oboes d'amore, 2 violins, viola and continuo by J. S. Bach".

In the following table of the movements, the scoring and keys follow the Neue Bach-Ausgabe. The keys and time signatures are taken from the book on all cantatas by the Bach scholar Alfred Dürr, using the symbol for common time (4/4). The continuo, played throughout, is not shown.

Movements of Ach Gott, wie manches Herzeleid
No.	Title	Text	Type	Vocal	Winds	Strings	Key	Time
1	Ach Gott, wie manches Herzeleid	Moller	Chorus	SATB	Tb 2Oa	2Vl Va	A major	common time
2	Wie schwerlich läßt sich Fleisch und Blut	Moller; anon.	Recitative and chorale	T S A B			A major	common time
3	Empfind ich Höllenangst und Pein	anon.	Aria	B			F-sharp minor	3/4
4	Es mag mir Leib und Geist verschmachten	anon.	Recitative	T				common time
5	Wenn Sorgen auf mich dringen	anon.	Aria Duetto	S A	2Oa	Vl (unis.)	E major	common time
6	Erhalt mein Herz im Glauben rein	Moller	Chorale	SATB	Co 2Ob	2Vl Va	A major	common time

=== Movements ===
Bach uses a melody of "Herr Jesu Christ, meins Lebens Licht" which appeared first in the Lochamer-Liederbuch. The melody appears in the opening chorus, sung by the bass as a cantus firmus, in the second movement, as a four-part setting with interspersed recitatives, and in the closing chorale.

=== 1 ===
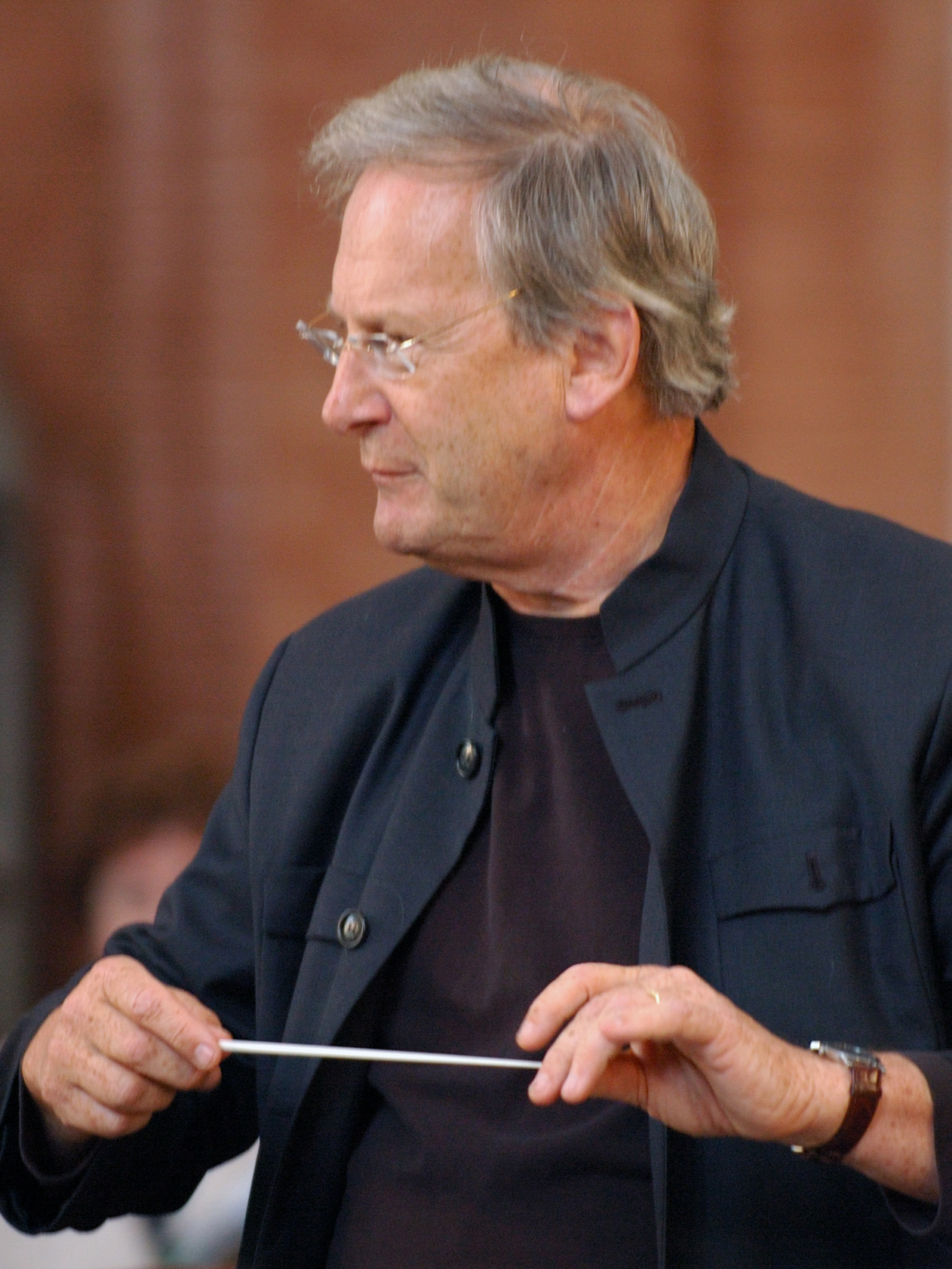
John Eliot Gardiner, who conducted the Bach Cantata Pilgrimage, in 2007

In the opening chorus, "Ach Gott, wie manches Herzeleid" (Ah, God, how much heartache), the cantus firmus is in the bass, which is doubled by the trombone, as in Ach Herr, mich armen Sünder, BWV 135. Its mood of lamentation is supported by "elegiac sounds" of the oboes d'amore, sighing motifs in the strings, and the upper voices reflecting the oboe motifs. John Eliot Gardiner, who conducted the Bach Cantata Pilgrimage in 2000, notes that Bach used a repeated motif of six notes in chromatic descent, which is often used in chaconnes of the Baroque opera to express grief. The motif is used for the instrumental opening, each entry of a voice, interludes and conclusion.

=== 2 ===
The recitative, "Wie schwerlich läßt sich Fleisch und Blut" (How difficult it is for flesh and blood), combines the hymn tune sung by the four-part choir, with interpolated text sung by the soloists in turn. The lines of the hymn are separated by a joyful ostinato motif derived from the chorale tune. The musicologist Julian Mincham writes that the "hybrid recitative provides an excellent example of Bach's experiments of investing long texts with sustained musical interest".

=== 3 ===
The bass aria, "Empfind ich Höllenangst und Pein" (Although I experience the fear and torment of Hell), is accompanied by the continuo. It expresses the contrast of Höllenangst (hell's anguish) and Freudenhimmel (heaven of joy), with inestimable sorrows (unermessnen Schmerzen) disappearing into light mist (leichte Nebel).

=== 4 ===
A tenor recitative, "Es mag mir Leib und Geist verschmachten" (My body and spirit might despair), expresses trust in Jesus to overcome despair.

=== 5 ===
In the duet for soprano and alto, "Wenn Sorgen auf mich dringen" (When cares press upon me), in "bright E major", as the Bach scholar Christoph Wolff writes, the voices are embedded in a "dense quartet texture". He concludes that the movement "banishes human care by means of joyful singing". The Bach scholar Klaus Hofmann notes that the obbligato motif, which is later picked up by the voices, is played by the oboes d'amore and violin in unison, providing "a new and remarkable tone colour". Bach refers to the Cross, as mentioned in the text, by using a cross-motif in the melody and applying double sharp marked by a cross. The voices intensify words such as dringen (press) and singen (sing) by extended coloraturas.

=== 6 ===
The closing chorale, "Erhalt mein Herz im Glauben rein" (If my heart remains pure in faith), is a four-part setting. The choral melody, now in the soprano, is reinforced by a horn.

== Recordings ==
The selection is taken from the listing on the Bach-Cantatas website.

Recordings of Ach Gott, wie manches Herzeleid
Title	Conductor / Choir / Orchestra	Soloists	Label	Year	Instr.
Bach Aria Group – Cantatas, Arias & Choruses	Brian Priestman Bach Aria Group Chorus & Orchestra	Lois Marshall; Maureen Forrester; Richard Lewis; Norman Farrow	Vox	1960s?	
J. S. Bach: Das Kantatenwerk • Complete Cantatas • Les Cantates, Folge / Vol. 1	Nikolaus Harnoncourt: Wiener Sängerknaben; Chorus Viennensis; Concentus Musicus Wien	soloist of the Wiener Sängerknaben; Paul Esswood; Kurt Equiluz; Max van Egmond	Teldec	1970	Period
Die Bach Kantate Vol. 22	Helmuth Rilling Gächinger Kantorei Bach-Collegium Stuttgart	Arleen Augér; Gabriele Schreckenbach; Lutz-Michael Harder; Philippe Huttenlocher	Hänssler	1980	
Bach Edition Vol. 12 – Cantatas Vol. 5	Pieter Jan Leusink Holland Boys Choir Netherlands Bach Collegium	Ruth Holton; Sytse Buwalda; Knut Schoch; Bas Ramselaar	Brilliant Classics	1999	Period
Bach Cantatas Vol. 19: Greenwich/Romsey	John Eliot Gardiner Monteverdi Choir English Baroque Soloists	Joanne Lunn; Richard Wyn Roberts; Julian Podger; Gerald Finley	Soli Deo Gloria	2000	Period
J. S. Bach: Complete Cantatas Vol. 15	Ton Koopman Amsterdam Baroque Orchestra & Choir	Sandrine Piau; Bogna Bartosz; Paul Agnew; Klaus Mertens	Antoine Marchand	2001	Period
J. S. Bach: Cantatas Vol. 29	Masaaki Suzuki Bach Collegium Japan	Dorothee Mields; Pascal Bertin; Gerd Türk; Peter Kooy	BIS	1996	Period
