= Frank Brieff =

American musician and conductor

Frank Brieff (19 April 1912 – 22 November 2005) was an American musician and conductor. He was the conductor of the New Haven Symphony, the Bach Aria Group, and the Waterbury Symphony. He also conducted the Columbia Symphony Orchestra.

He was a violist who played in the NBC Symphony Orchestra under Arturo Toscanini. He also played with saxophonist Charlie Parker in a 1950 jazz recording.

In 1964, from 1969 to 1971, and in 1973, he conducted the Naumburg Orchestral Concerts, in the Naumburg Bandshell, Central Park, in the summer series.
