= Gabriele Schreckenbach =

German opera singer

- Born: Berlin
- Education: Hochschule der Künste Berlin
- Occupations: Classical contralto; Academic voice teacher
- Organization: Hochschule für Künste Bremen

Gabriele Schreckenbach (born in Berlin) is a German contralto singer in opera and concert and an academic voice teacher.

She recorded Bach cantatas with the Gächinger Kantorei and Helmuth Rilling. She recorded choral works of Mozart, his Waisenhausmesse K. 139 and rarely performed pieces, with the RIAS Kammerchor and the Berlin Radio Symphony Orchestra, conducted by Marcus Creed. She recorded the part of Ursula in the opera Feuersnot of Richard Strauss with Erich Leinsdorf and parts in three operas of Paul Hindemith with Gerd Albrecht, who also conducted recordings of Die Gezeichneten of Franz Schreker and Der Corregidor of Hugo Wolf. She recorded the part of Iocaste in Stravinsky's Oedipus rex with Ferdinand Leitner. In 1994 she was appointed professor at the Hochschule für Künste Bremen.
