= The Flight into Egypt (Rembrandt) =

Painting by Rembrandt

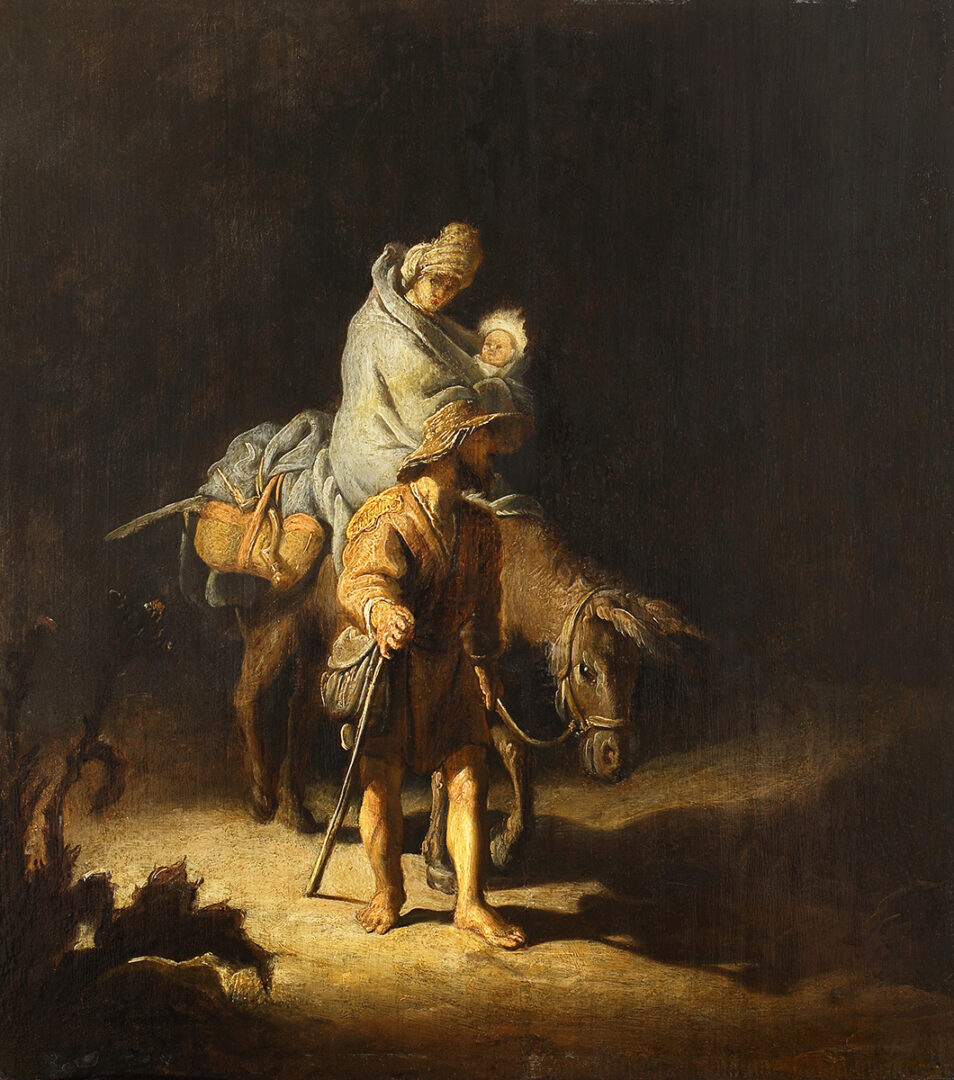
- Artist: Rembrandt van Rijn
- Year: 1627
- Type: Oil on panel
- Dimensions: 26 cm × 24 cm (10 in × 9.4 in)
- Location: Musée des Beaux-Arts de Tours; Tours

The Flight into Egypt is a 1627 oil painting on panel by Rembrandt, now in the Musée des Beaux-Arts de Tours, which depicts the Flight into Egypt by Joseph, Mary, and Jesus.

== See also ==
- List of paintings by Rembrandt
