= Mutsumi Hatano =

Japanese mezzo-soprano

- Born: Japan
- Occupation: Classical mezzo-soprano
- Organizations: Bach Collegium Japan

Mutsumi Hatano (波多野 睦美, Hatano Mutsumi) is a Japanese mezzo-soprano who has appeared mostly in concert. She is a member of the Bach Collegium Japan, and has appeared internationally.

== Career ==
Hatano studied at the Miyazaki University, and further at Trinity College with E. Hawes. From 1998, she has been a member of the Bach Collegium Japan, conducted by Masaaki Suzuki, both as a soloist and a choir member in concerts and recordings, including the recording of all Bach cantatas. She is a soloist in their 2001 recording of Monteverdi's Vespro della Beata Vergine.

She has performed and recorded lute songs with lutenist Takashi Tsunoda. She performed the premiere of Michio Mamiya's Serenade No. 3, Germ, with Yo-Yo Ma in Minnesota in May 2001.
