= Martin Moller =

German poet and mystic

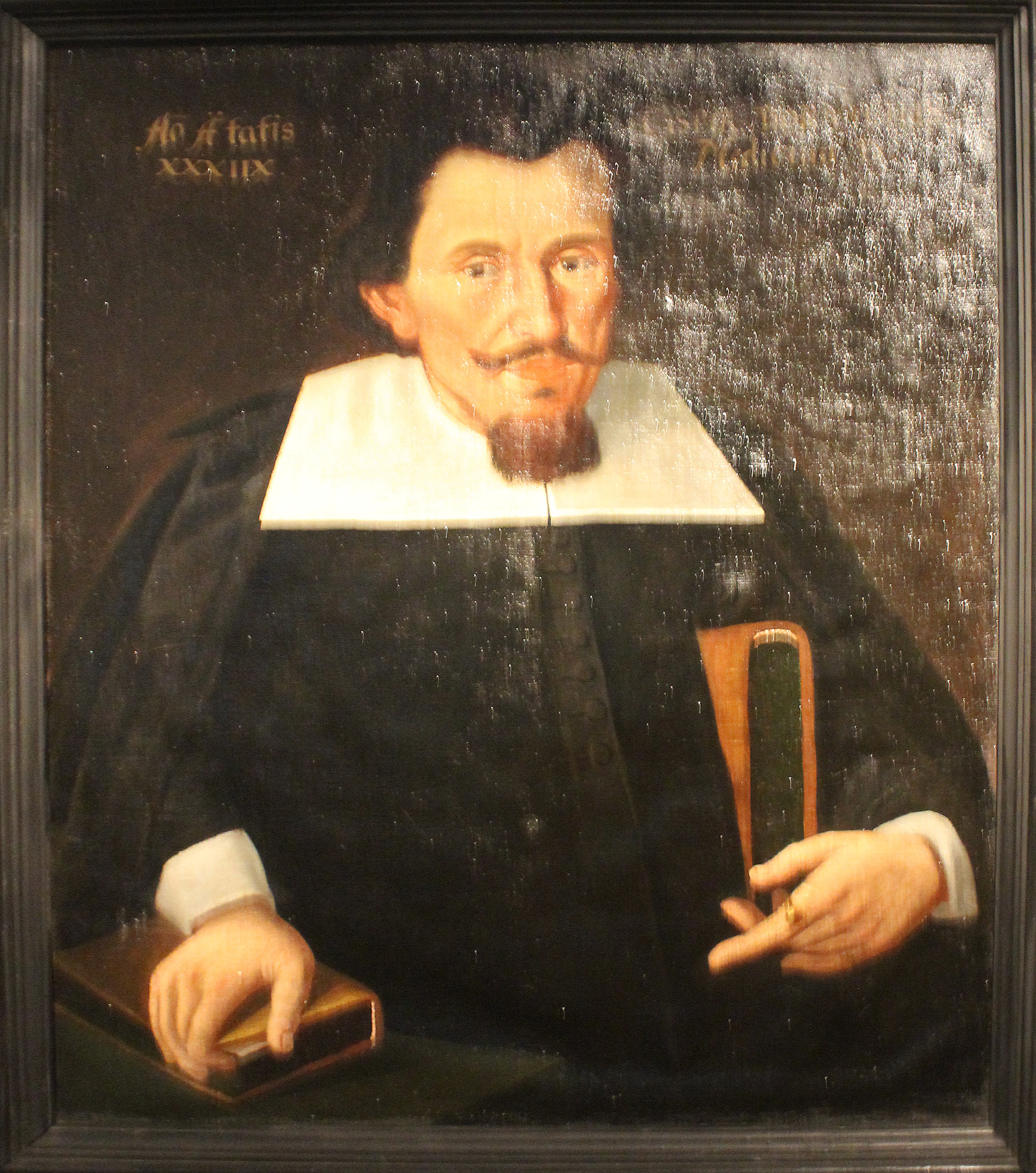
- Portrait of Moller
- Born: 10 November 1547; Ließnitz, Holy Roman Empire
- Died: 2 March 1606 (aged 58); Görlitz, Holy Roman Empire
- Occupations: Luheran pastor; Hymnwriter

Martin Moller (10 November 1547 – 2 March 1606) was a German poet and mystic.

== Life ==
Moller was born in Ließnitz (now Kropstädt near Wittenberg, Saxony-Anhalt) in 1547 and became cantor in Löwenberg in Lower Silesia in 1568. He was ordained in 1572, despite never having been to university, and served as pastor and deacon in Kesseldorf, Löwenberg and Sprottau. He came to Görlitz in 1600, where Jakob Böhme was in his congregation. Böhme was a keen attendant at the devotional meetings Moller held at his house; only after Moller's death at Görlitz in 1606 did Böhme start coming into conflict with the Görlitz clergy.

== Works ==
Moller's works characterise him as a conciliatory theologian rather than one who, like Böhme, looked to provoke conflict. Practical Christianity, not dogma, was important to him. In this regard he can be regarded as a forerunner of Johann Arndt.

He was suspected of Crypto-Calvinist sympathies after publishing his Praxis evangeliorum in 1601 and did little to refute these claims. Other well-known works of devotional literature written by Moller include Meditationes Sanctorum Patrum (1584–1591), Soliloquia de passione Jesu Christi (1587) and Mysterium magnum (1597). All of these works show clearly how Moller was influenced by another German theologian with links to mysticism, Valerius Herberger.

He also wrote several hymns, four of which survive in today's German Protestant hymnals. He is, however, of greater importance as a source for other hymn-writers. His Meditationes Sanctorum Patrum, a bipartite collection of prayers purportedly based on writings of Augustine, Bernard of Clairvaux and Anselm of Canterbury (though actually these texts were probably pseudo-Augustinian and -Bernardian, written much later in the style of the Church Fathers), provided Johann Heermann with a basis for many of the hymns in his Devoti musica cordis.

Johann Sebastian Bach wrote two chorale cantatas on hymns by Moller or attributed to him, Ach Gott, wie manches Herzeleid, BWV 3, and Nimm von uns, Herr, du treuer Gott, BWV 101.
