= Singet dem Herrn ein neues Lied (disambiguation) =

Sing(e)t dem Herr(e)n ein neues Lied is German for "sing unto the Lord a new song". The German expression may refer to:

- Psalm 96, "O sing unto the Lord a new song: sing unto the Lord, all the earth"
- Psalm 98, "O sing unto the Lord a new song; for he hath done marvellous things"
- Psalm 149, "... Sing unto the Lord a new song, and his praise in the congregation of saints"
- Singet dem Herrn ein neues Lied, SWV 35, Heinrich Schütz's setting of Psalm 98 in Psalmen Davids (1619).
- Singet dem Herrn ein neues Lied, SWV 194, Heinrich Schütz's setting of Psalm 96 in the Becker Psalter (1628).
- Singet dem Herrn ein neues Lied, SWV 196, Heinrich Schütz's setting of Psalm 98 in the Becker Psalter (1628).
- "Singet dem Herrn ein neues Lied," a Lutheran hymn by Matthäus Apelles von Löwenstern, based on Psalm 149 and published with the author's setting in 1644.
- Singet dem Herren ein neues Lied, SWV 342, setting in Heinrich Schütz's Symphoniae sacrae II (1647).
- Singet dem Herren ein neues Lied, BuxWV 98, cantata by Dieterich Buxtehude.
- Singet dem Herrn ein neues Lied, motet by Johann Pachelbel
- Singet dem Herrn ein neues Lied (Hoffmann), a 1708 cantata by Melchior Hoffmann, based on Psalm 96.
- Singet dem Herrn ein neues Lied, TWV 1:1342–1345, four cantatas with the same title by Georg Philipp Telemann
- Singet dem Herrn ein neues Lied, TWV 7:30, Telemann's setting of Psalm 96
- Singet dem Herrn ein neues Lied, BWV 190(.1), a 1724 cantata by Johann Sebastian Bach, with the words of the opening chorus based on Psalm 149.
- Singet dem Herrn ein neues Lied, BWV 225 a motet by Johann Sebastian Bach, with opening words based on Psalm 149, likely composed in the late 1720s.
- Singet dem Herrn ein neues Lied, BWV 190a (190.2), Johann Sebastian Bach's 1730 reworking of his 1724 cantata with the same name.
- "Singet dem Herrn ein neues Lied" (BWV 411), Johann Sebastian Bach's chorale harmonisation of Löwenstern's hymn tune, first published in the second half of the 18th century
- Singet dem Herrn ein neues Lied, BR-JCFB F 6, cantata by Johann Christoph Friedrich Bach (1785)
- Singet dem Herrn ein neues Lied (Mendelssohn), Felix Mendelssohn's Op. 91, setting Psalm 98 for eight-part choir and orchestra (1843)
- "Singet dem Herrn ein neues Lied" (Distler), Hugo Distler's Op. 12 Nr. 1
- "Singt dem Herrn ein neues Lied" (Kempf), a 1941 Christian hymn by Georg Alfred Kempf, with opening words reminiscent of Psalm 98.

== See also ==
- "Nun singt ein neues Lied dem Herren"
- "Singet ein neues Lied"
