= Jesu, nun sei gepreiset, BWV 41 =

1725 church cantata by Johann Sebastian Bach

Jesu, nun sei gepreiset
- BWV 41
- Chorale cantata by J. S. Bach
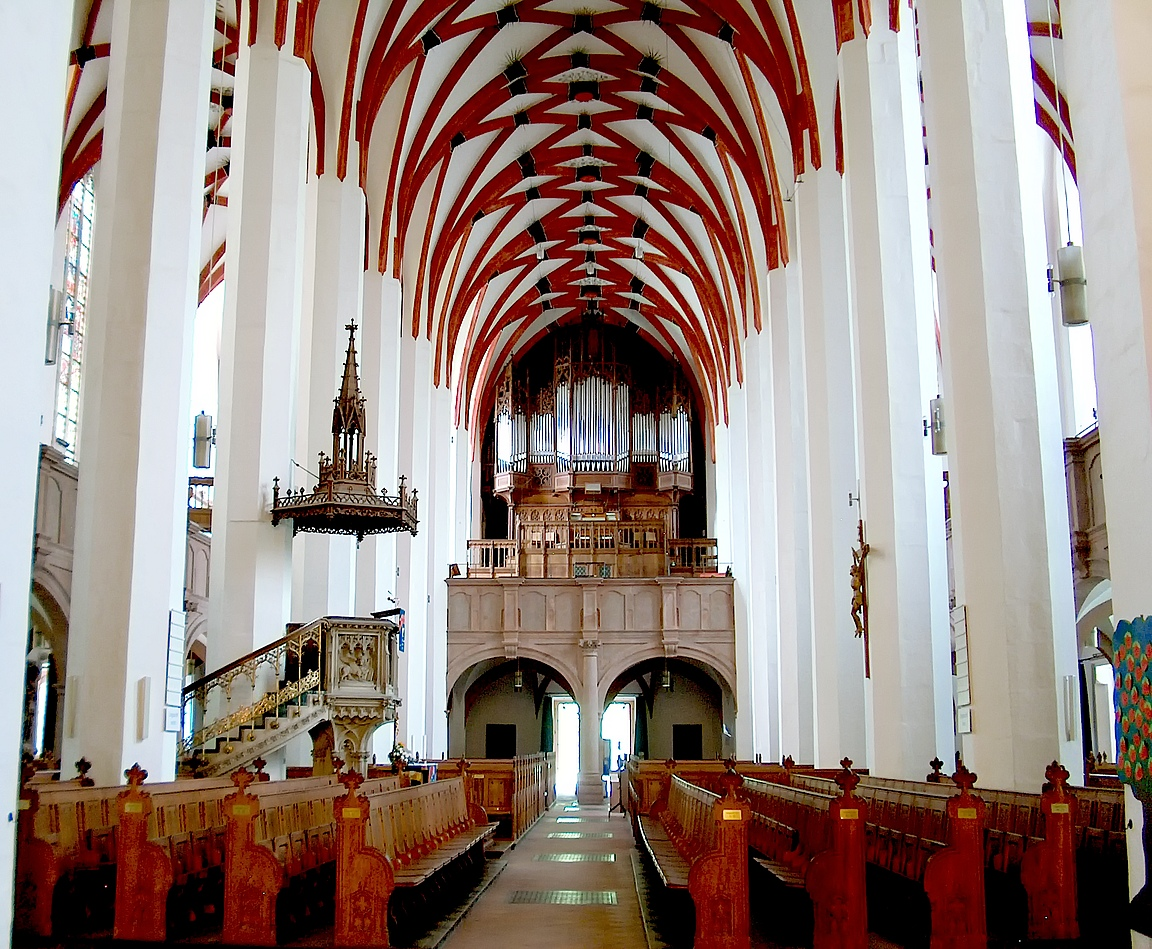
- Thomaskirche, Leipzig
- Occasion: New Year's Day
- Chorale: "Jesu, nun sei gepreiset" by Johannes Hermann
- Performed: 1 January 1725: Leipzig
- Movements: 6
- Vocal: SATB choir and solo
- Instrumental: 3 trumpets; timpani; 3 oboes; 2 violins; viola; violoncello piccolo da spalla; continuo

Jesu, nun sei gepreiset (Jesus, now be praised), BWV 41, (Note: "BWV" is Bach-Werke-Verzeichnis, a thematic catalogue of Bach's works.) is a church cantata by Johann Sebastian Bach. He composed it in Leipzig for New Year's Day and first performed it on 1 January 1725. It is based on the hymn of the same name that Johannes Hermann wrote for the same occasion, published in 1591. The feast celebrated also the naming of Jesus, but hymn and cantata, while addressing Jesus by name immediately, focus on the turn of the year in thanks for received blessings and prayers for continued support.

The cantata is part of Bach's chorale cantata cycle, the second cycle during his tenure as Thomaskantor that began in 1723. In the style of the cycle, an unknown poet retained the outer stanzas for framing choral movements and paraphrased the middle stanza into four movements for soloists, alternating arias and recitatives. Bach scored the work for four soloists, a four-part choir and a festive Baroque instrumental ensemble of three trumpets and timpani, oboes, strings including a violoncello piccolo da spalla, and basso continuo. The chorale movements with the full orchestra contrast with the inner movements that have been described as chamber music. Bach illustrated the cycle of the years by using material from the first movement, trumpet fanfares, also in the last, ending the work similarly to its beginning.

== History, hymn and words ==
Bach wrote Jesu, nun sei gepreiset in 1724, his second year as Thomaskantor in Leipzig, for New Year's Day. The feast also celebrated the naming and circumcision of Jesus. The prescribed readings for the feast day were from the Epistle to the Galatians, by faith we inherit (Galatians 3:23–29), and from the Gospel of Luke, the Circumcision and naming of Jesus (Luke 2:21).

In 1724, Bach composed his chorale cantata cycle; he began on the first Sunday after Trinity to write for each occasion of the liturgical year a cantata that was based on one Lutheran hymn. Thus cantata is based on a 1593 hymn for New Year's Day in three long stanzas of 14 lines each by Johannes Hermann, a theologian born in Silesia who had also been a Thomaskantor. Its melody was composed by Melchior Vulpius, who first published it in his Ein schön geistlich Gesangbuch, printed in Jena in 1609. The hymn calls Jesus by name first, fitting for the celebration of the naming. Otherwise it is more concerned with the beginning of another new year. The hymn was popular in Leipzig and was used in two more of Bach's cantatas for the occasion, Singet dem Herrn ein neues Lied, BWV 190, the previous year and Gott, wie dein Name, so ist auch dein Ruhm, BWV 171, in 1729.

In the style of Bach's chorale cantata cycle, an unknown poet retained the outer stanzas for framing choral movements 1 and 6, and paraphrased the middle stanza into a sequence of alternating arias and recitatives. He expanded the 14 lines by additional ideas but without specific references to the Gospel reading. He used exact quotes from the hymn in all these movements.

Bach led the Thomanerchor in the first performance of the cantata on 1 January 1725, and reprised it at least once, between 1732 and 1735.

== Music ==
=== Structure and scoring ===
Bach structured Jesu, nun sei gepreiset in six movements. Both the text and the tune of the hymn are retained in the outer movements, a chorale fantasia and a four-part closing chorale. Bach scored the work for four vocal soloists (soprano (S), alto (A), tenor (T) and bass (B)), a four-part choir, and a Baroque instrumental ensemble of three trumpets (Tr), timpani (Ti), three oboes (Oa), two violin parts (Vl), one viola part (Va), violoncello piccolo da spalla (Vp) and basso continuo. The duration of the cantata is given as 30 minutes.

In the following table of the movements, the scoring, keys and time signatures are taken from Alfred Dürr's standard work Die Kantaten von Johann Sebastian Bach. The continuo, which plays throughout, is not shown.

Movements of Jesu, nun sei gepreiset
No.	Title	Type	Vocal	Brass	Winds	Strings	Key	Time
1	Jesu, nun sei gepreiset	Chorus	SATB	3Tr, Ti	3Ob	2Vl Va	C major	common time
2	Laß uns, o höchster Gott	Aria	Soprano		3Ob		G major	6/8
3	Ach! deine Hand, dein Segen muss allein	Recitative	Alto					common time
4	Woferne du den edlen Frieden	Aria	Tenor			Vp	A minor	common time
5	Doch weil der Feind bei Tag und Nacht	Recitative	SAT, Bass solo					common time
6	Dein ist allein die Ehre, dein ist allein der Ruhm	Chorale	SATB	3Tr, Ti	3Ob	2Vl Va	C major	common time

=== Movements ===
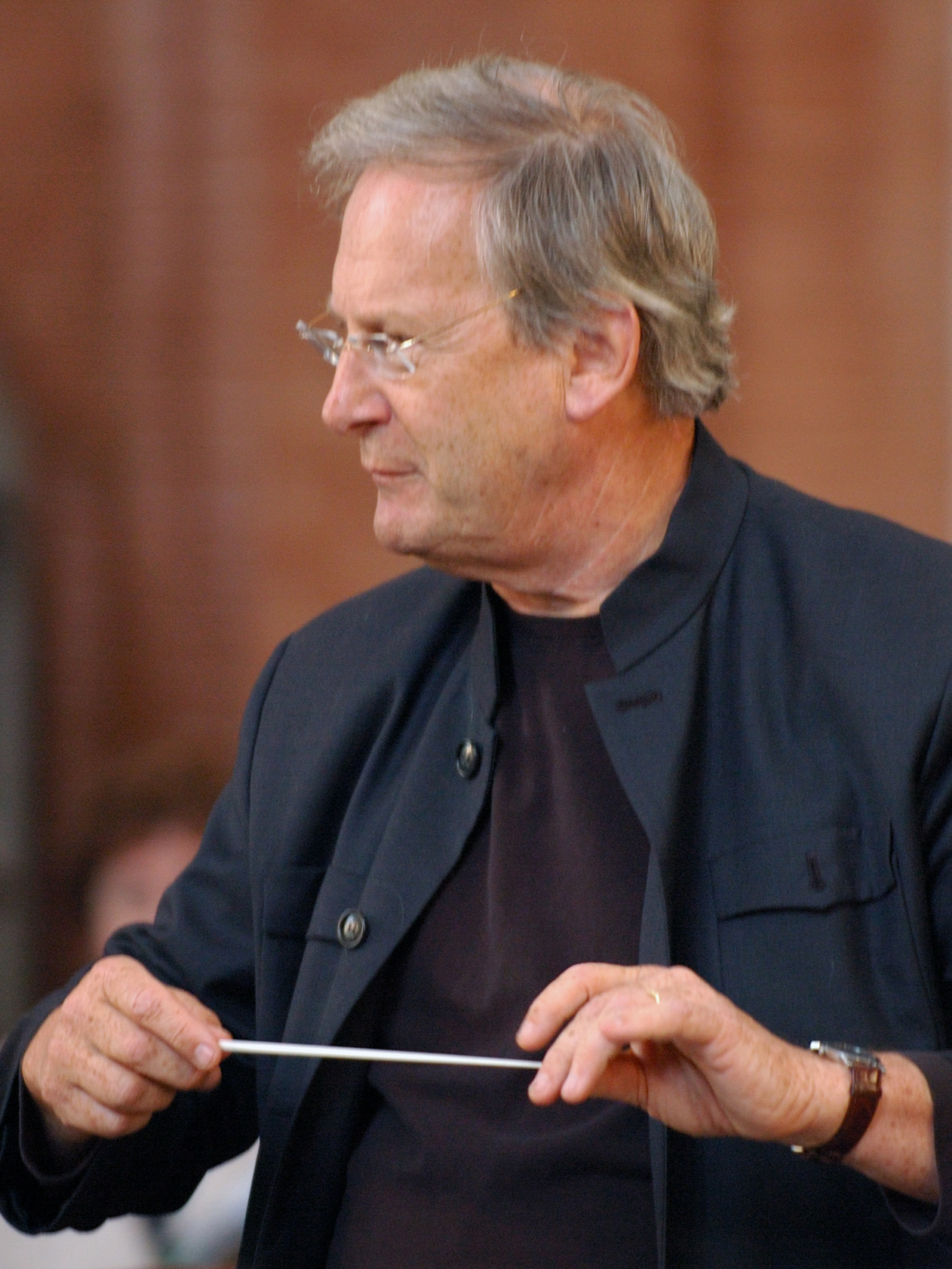
Gardiner in a rehearsal, 2007

John Eliot Gardiner who conducted the Bach Cantata Pilgrimage in 2000 and thus performed the cantata in its first concert, noted that Bach and his time followed the "rhythms and patterns of the liturgical year", "perhaps even with perceptions of the basic cyclic round of life and death". He observed Bach's musical ways to illustrate the "progression from beginning to end to new beginning", including a quote of material from the first movement in the last.

==== 1 ====
In the opening chorale fantasia, "Jesu, nun sei gepreiset zu diesem neuen Jahr" (Jesus, now be praised at this new year), Bach faced the problem of structuring the unusually long stanza of 14 lines and an additional repeat of the last two lines, as seems to have been customary in Leipzig. The concerto of the orchestra is dominated by a syncope fanfare motif from the trumpets. In the first four lines, repeated in the next four and the final two, the soprano sings the cantus firmus, with the lower voices in free polyphony. The melody ends a note higher than it began. Lines 9 and 10, speaking of "daß wir in guter Stille das alt' Jahr hab'n erfüllet" (... in good silence ...) are marked adagio; the choir sings in homophony in triple meter, accompanied by the orchestra without the trumpets, which Gardiner described "a moment of magic when the forward momentum comes to a sudden halt". Lines 11 and 12, repeated in 13 and 14, are a presto fugato, with the instruments playing colla parte; the fugal subject is derived from the first phrase of the chorale melody. The fugato expresses "Wir wollen uns dir ergeben" (We want to devote ourselves to you), an "enthusiastic rededication to spiritual values".

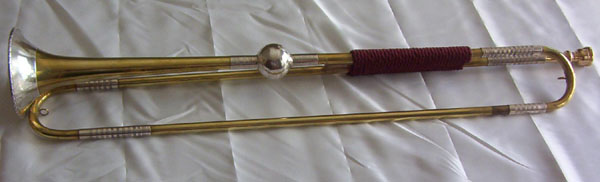
Baroque trumpet

Lines 15 and 16 repeat lines 1 and 2, saying "behüt Leib, Seel und Leben" (Protect our body, soul and life). In this repetition, Bach achieved "a majestic concluding sweep", as Gardiner wrote, with a reprise of the initial fanfare music.

==== 2 ====
In contrast, both arias have been described as chamber music. The first aria, "Laß uns, o höchster Gott, das Jahr vollbringen" (Let us, O highest God, complete the year), is sung by the soprano, accompanied by three oboes in pastoral 6/8 time. A concluding Halleluja is richly ornamented, reminiscent of a medieval jubilus.

==== 3 ====
A short secco recitative follows, "Ach! deine Hand, dein Segen muß allein das A und O, der Anfang und das Ende sein" (Ah! your hand, your blessing must alone be the A and O, the beginning and the end).

==== 4 ====
A tenor aria, "Woferne du den edlen Frieden" (As far as you have ordained noble peace), is dominated by an obbligato violoncello piccolo in expansive movement. It was then a new instrument, offering flexibility and a broad range.

==== 5 ====
A recitative for bass, "Doch weil der Feind bei Tag und Nacht zu unserm Schaden wacht" (Yet since the enemy day and night watches for our harm), contains one line from Martin Luther's Deutsche Litanei (German litany). Bach highlighted this line, "den Satan unter unsre Füße treten" (crush Satan under our feet), setting it for four-part choir marked allegro, as if the congregation joined the prayer of the individual. The soprano sings the melody from Luther's Litanei.

==== 6 ====
The closing chorale, "Dein ist allein die Ehre" (Yours alone is the honor), is a four-part setting with independent instruments; the trumpets repeat the first two bars from the opening ritornello of the first movement a postlude after lines of this final movement. This miniaturised pattern connects the cantata's beginning and end. The trumpets are silent in lines 9 to 14; lines 11 to 14 are in 3/4 time, but then the final fanfare recalls the beginning. Gardiner noted that Bach achieves a suggestion of the year's cycle by ending both the first movement and the end of the cantata as the work began, as a "closing of the circle".

== Manuscripts and publication ==
Bach's autograph score of the cantata is extant, and a set of the parts missing only the original timpani part. Bach's heirs split the orchestral part, with the first copies remaining in Leipzig, while a duplicate set for strings belonged, with the score, first to Bach's son Wilhelm Friedemann Bach, the to Christian Friedrich Penzel in Ölsnitz. In the 18th century, both sets were expanded to complete performance material, indicating that this cantata was appreciated. Two original parts exist for violin I which also contain the part of the violoncello piccolo. The first was for the 1725 performance, copied by Johann Andreas Kuhnau. The second dates to the 1730s, copied by Anna Magdalena Bach for the first movement, by J. S. Bach, beginning with the fourth movement.

The cantata was first published in 1860 in the first complete edition of Bach's work, the Bach-Gesellschaft Ausgabe. The volume in question was edited by Wilhelm Rust. In the Neue Bach-Ausgabe it was published in 1965, edited by Werner Neumann.

== Recordings ==
A list of recordings is provided on the Bach Cantatas Website. Instrumental groups playing period instruments in historically informed performances are marked by green background.

Recordings of Jesu, nun sei gepreiset
Title	Conductor / Choir / Orchestra	Soloists	Label	Year	Instr.
Bach Made in Germany Vol. 1 – Cantatas II	Günther Ramin Thomanerchor Gewandhausorchester	soloists from Thomanerchor; Gert Lutze; Johannes Oettel	Leipzig Classics	1950	
Bach Aria Group – Cantatas & Cantata Movements	Robert Shaw Robert Shaw Chorale & Orchestra	Eileen Farrell; Carol Smith; Jan Peerce; Norman Farrow	RCA	1954	
Die Bach Kantate Vol. 19	Helmuth Rilling Gächinger Kantorei Bach-Collegium Stuttgart	Helen Donath; Marga Höffgen; Adalbert Kraus; Siegmund Nimsgern	Hänssler	1973	
J. S. Bach: Das Kantatenwerk – Sacred Cantatas Vol. 3	Nikolaus Harnoncourt: Wiener Sängerknaben; Chorus Viennensis; Concentus Musicus Wien	soloist from Wiener Sängerknaben; Paul Esswood; Kurt Equiluz; Ruud van der Meer	Teldec	1974	Period
J. S. Bach: Cantatas with Violoncelle Piccolo (Vo. 3)	Christophe Coin Chœur de Chambre Accentus Ensemble Baroque de Limoges	Barbara Schlick; Andreas Scholl; Christoph Prégardien; Gotthold Schwarz	Astrée Auvidis	1995	Period
J. S. Bach: Complete Cantatas Vol. 11	Ton Koopman Amsterdam Baroque Orchestra & Choir	Sibylla Rubens; Annette Markert; Christoph Prégardien; Klaus Mertens	Antoine Marchand	1999	Period
Bach Cantatas Vol. 17: Berlinurg	John Eliot Gardiner Monteverdi Choir English Baroque Soloists	Lucy Ballard; Charles Humphries; James Gilchrist; Peter Harvey	Soli Deo Gloria	2000	Period
Bach Edition Vol. 21 – Cantatas Vol. 12	Pieter Jan Leusink Holland Boys Choir Netherlands Bach Collegium	Ruth Holton; Sytse Buwalda; Knut Schoch; Bas Ramselaar	Brilliant Classics	2000	Period
J. S. Bach: Cantatas Vol. 33	Masaaki Suzuki Bach Collegium Japan	Yukari Nonoshita; Robin Blaze; Jan Kobow; Dominik Wörner	BIS	2005	Period
