= Singet dem Herrn ein neues Lied, BWV 190a =

Church cantata by Johann Sebastian Bach

Singet dem Herrn ein neues Lied
- BWV: 190.2; 190a
- Church cantata by Johann Sebastian Bach
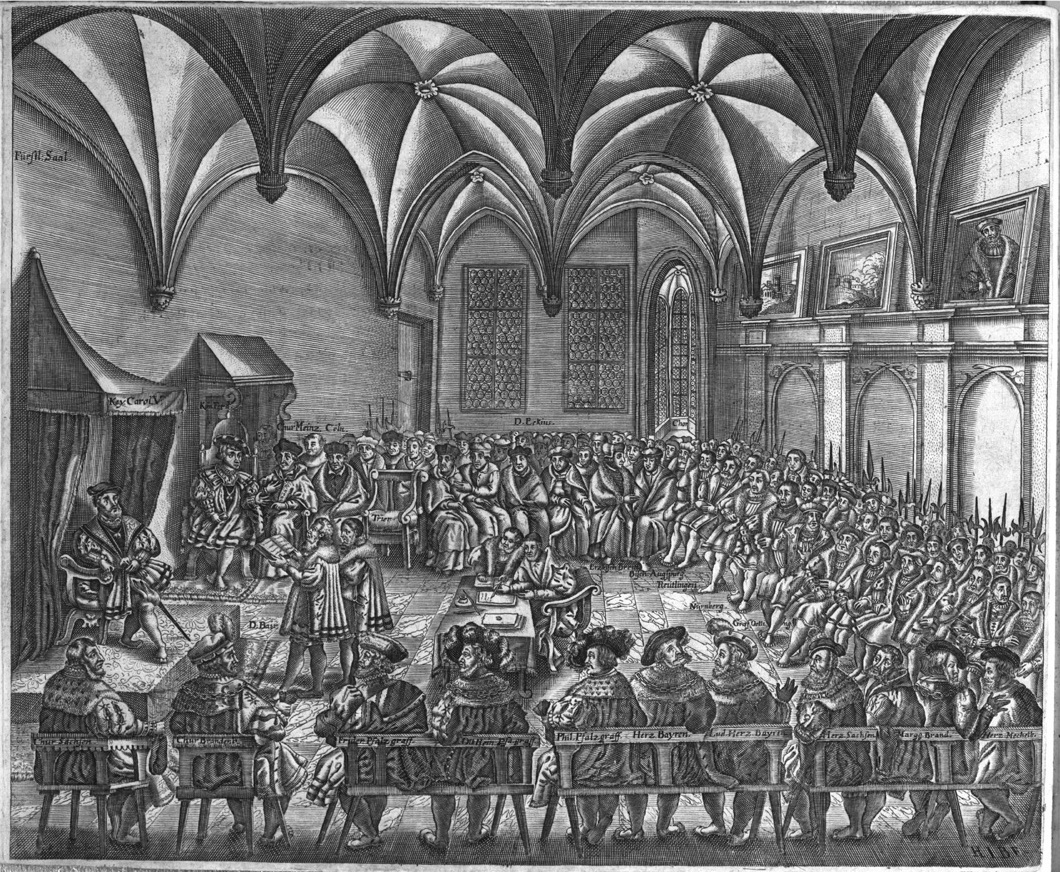
- Diet of Augsburg by Christian Beyer
- Occasion: 200th anniversary of the Augsburg Confession
- Cantata text: Picander
- Chorale: Martin Luther
- Performed: 25 June 1730: St. Nicholas Church, Leipzig
- Movements: 7
- Vocal: SATB choir and ATB solo
- Instrumental: 3 trumpets; timpani; 3 oboes; bassoon; 2 violins; viola; continuo

Singet dem Herrn ein neues Lied (Sing a new song to the Lord), BWV 90.2, BWV 190a, is a cantata by Johann Sebastian Bach. The work was written in 1730 in commemoration of the Augsburg Confession.

== History and text ==
Bach adapted this cantata from Singet dem Herrn ein neues Lied, BWV 190, for the 200th anniversary of the Augsburg Confession. It uses a text by Picander, published in 1732 in Ernst-Schertzhaffte und Satyrische Gedichte part 3, in Leipzig. The first movement adapts words from Psalms 149 and 150. The second movement is based on the beginning of Martin Luther's German Te Deum, "Herr Gott, dich loben wir".

The closing chorale was the third stanza of Luther's "Es woll uns Gott genädig sein" (1523).

The cantata's music is lost. Diethard Hellmann wrote a reconstruction in 1972.

== Structure ==
The work has seven movements:

1. Chorus: Singet dem Herrn ein neues Lied
2. Chorale and recitative (alto, tenor, bass): Herr Gott, dich loben wir
3. Aria (alto): Lobe, Zion, deinen Gott
4. Recitative (bass): Herr, wenn dein Evangelium
5. Aria (tenor, bass): Selig sind wir durch das Wort
6. Recitative (tenor): Nun Gott, wir opfern dir
7. Chorale: Es danke, Gott, und lobe dich

== Recordings ==
- Bachchor und Bachorchester Mainz, Diethard Hellmann. Bach Kantaten, Vol. 1: BWV 190a, BWV 84, BWV 89, BWV 27. DdM-Records Mitterteich, 1998.
