= Benedicite =

Christian song of praise

- Canticle
- Other name: Benedicite, omnia opera Domini; A Song of Creation
- Language: Latin (original), English
- Based on: The Song of the Three Children

The Benedicite (also Benedicite, omnia opera Domini or A Song of Creation) is a canticle that is used in the Catholic Liturgy of the Hours, and is also used in Anglican and Lutheran worship. The text is either verses 35–65 or verses 35–66 of The Song of the Three Children. Newer versions often omit the final verse, and may reduce the number of occurrences of the refrain "sing his praise and exalt him for ever" (or its equivalent).

In Catholic tradition, the canticle can also be sung or recited in its complete form as a thanksgiving after Holy Mass. Bible passages from the Book of Daniel (Dan. 3, 57-88 and 56) and Psalm 148 form the core of this canticle.

== Text ==
=== Latin ===
The text follows the Catholic Office of Lauds at Sundays and Feasts:

BENEDICITE, omnia opera Domini, Domino; laudate et superexaltate eum in saecula.
BENEDICITE, caeli, Domino, benedicite, angeli Domini, Domino.
BENEDICITE, aquae omnes, quae super caelos sunt, Domino, benedicite omnes virtutes Domini, Domino.
BENEDICITE, sol et luna, Domino, benedicite, stellae caeli, Domino.
BENEDICITE, omnis imber et ros, Domino, benedicite, omnes venti, Domino.
BENEDICITE, ignis et aestus, Domino, benedicite, frigus et aestus, Domino.
BENEDICITE, rores et pruina, Domino, benedicite, gelu et frigus, Domino.
BENEDICITE, glacies et nives, Domino, benedicite, noctes et dies, Domino.
BENEDICITE, lux et tenebrae, Domino, benedicite, fulgura et nubes, Domino.
BENEDICAT terra Dominum: laudet et superexaltet eum in saecula.
BENEDICITE, montes et colles, Domino, benedicite, universa germinantia in terra, Domino.
BENEDICITE, maria et flumina, Domino, benedicite, fontes, Domino.
BENEDICITE, cete, et omnia, quae moventur in aquis, Domino, benedicite, omnes volucres caeli, Domino.
BENEDICITE, omnes bestiae et pecora, Domino, benedicite, filii hominum, Domino.
BENEDIC, Israel, Domino, laudate et superexaltate eum in saecula.
BENEDICITE, sacerdotes Domini, Domino, benedicite, servi Domini, Domino.
BENEDICITE, spiritus et animae iustorum, Domino, benedicite, sancti et humiles corde, Domino.
BENEDICITE, Anania, Azaria, Misael, Domino, laudate et superexaltate eum in saecula.
BENEDICAMUS Patrem et Filium cum Sancto Spiritu; laudemus et superexaltemus eum in saecula.
BENEDICTUS es in firmamento caeli et laudabilis et gloriosus in saecula.
Amen.

=== English ===
==== Book of Common Prayer (1662) ====
O all ye Works of the Lord, bless ye the Lord : praise him, and magnify him for ever.
O ye Angels of the Lord, bless ye the Lord : praise him, and magnify him for ever.
O ye Heavens, bless ye the Lord : praise him, and magnify him for ever.
O ye Waters that be above the Firmament, bless ye the Lord : praise him, and magnify him for ever.
O all ye Powers of the Lord, bless ye the Lord : praise him, and magnify him for ever.
O ye Sun and Moon, bless ye the Lord : praise him, and magnify him for ever.
O ye Stars of Heaven, bless ye the Lord : praise him, and magnify him for ever.
O ye Showers and Dew, bless ye the Lord : praise him, and magnify him for ever.
O ye Winds of God, bless ye the Lord : praise him, and magnify him for ever.
O ye Fire and Heat, bless ye the Lord : praise him, and magnify him for ever.
O ye Winter and Summer, bless ye the Lord : praise him, and magnify him for ever.
O ye Dews and Frosts, bless ye the Lord : praise him, and magnify him for ever.
O ye Frost and Cold, bless ye the Lord : praise him, and magnify him for ever.
O ye Ice and Snow, bless ye the Lord : praise him, and magnify him for ever.
O ye Nights and Days, bless ye the Lord : praise him, and magnify him for ever.
O ye Light and Darkness, bless ye the Lord : praise him, and magnify him for ever.
O ye Lightnings and Clouds, bless ye the Lord : praise him, and magnify him for ever.
O let the Earth bless the Lord : yea, let it praise him, and magnify him for ever.
O ye Mountains and Hills, bless ye the Lord : praise him, and magnify him for ever.
O all ye Green Things upon the Earth, bless ye the Lord : praise him, and magnify him for ever.
O ye Wells, bless ye the Lord : praise him, and magnify him for ever.
O ye Seas and Floods, bless ye the Lord : praise him, and magnify him for ever.
O ye Whales, and all that move in the Waters, bless ye the Lord : praise him, and magnify him for ever.
O all ye Fowls of the Air, bless ye the Lord : praise him, and magnify him for ever.
O all ye Beasts and Cattle, bless ye the Lord : praise him, and magnify him for ever.
O ye Children of Men, bless ye the Lord : praise him, and magnify him for ever.
O let Israel bless the Lord : praise him, and magnify him for ever.
O ye Priests of the Lord, bless ye the Lord : praise him, and magnify him for ever.
O ye Servants of the Lord, bless ye the Lord : praise him, and magnify him for ever.
O ye Spirits and Souls of the Righteous, bless ye the Lord : praise him, and magnify him for ever.
O ye holy and humble Men of heart, bless ye the Lord : praise him, and magnify him for ever.
O Ananias, Azarias and Misael, bless ye the Lord : praise him, and magnify him for ever.

==== Book of Common Prayer (1979, Rite II) ====
Glorify the Lord, all you works of the Lord,
praise him and highly exalt him for ever.
In the firmament of his power, glorify the Lord,
praise him and highly exalt him for ever.

Glorify the Lord, you angels and all powers of the Lord,
O heavens and all waters above the heavens,
Sun and moon and stars of the sky, glorify the Lord,
praise him and highly exalt him for ever.

Glorify the Lord, every shower of rain and fall of dew,
all winds and fire and heat.
Winter and summer, glorify the Lord,
praise him and highly exalt him for ever.

Glorify the Lord, O chill and cold,
drops of dew and flakes of snow.
Frost and cold, ice and sleet, glorify the Lord,
praise him and highly exalt him for ever.

Glorify the Lord, O nights and days,
O shining light and enfolding dark.
Storm clouds and thunderbolts, glorify the Lord,
praise him and highly exalt him for ever.

Let the earth glorify the Lord,
praise him and highly exalt him for ever.
Glorify the Lord, O mountains and hills,
and all that grows upon the earth,
praise him and highly exalt him for ever.

Glorify the Lord, O springs of water, seas, and streams,
O whales and all that move in the waters,
All birds of the air, glorify the Lord,
praise him and highly exalt him for ever.

Glorify the Lord, O beasts of the wild,
and all you flocks and herds,
O men and women everywhere, glorify the Lord
praise him and highly exalt him for ever.

Let the people of God glorify the Lord,
praise him and highly exalt him for ever.
Glorify the Lord, O priests and servants of the Lord,
praise him and highly exalt him for ever.

Glorify the Lord, O spirits and souls of the righteous,
praise him and highly exalt him for ever.
You that are holy and humble of heart, glorify the Lord,
praise him and highly exalt him for ever.

==== Common Worship ====
Bless the Lord all you works of the Lord:
sing his praise and exalt him for ever.

Bless the Lord you heavens:
sing his praise and exalt him for ever.

Bless the Lord you angels of the Lord:
bless the Lord all you his hosts;

bless the Lord you waters above the heavens:
sing his praise and exalt him for ever.

Bless the Lord sun and moon:
bless the Lord you stars of heaven;

bless the Lord all rain and dew:
sing his praise and exalt him for ever.

Bless the Lord all winds that blow:
bless the Lord you fire and heat;

bless the Lord scorching wind and bitter cold:
sing his praise and exalt him for ever.

Bless the Lord dews and falling snows:
bless the Lord you nights and days;

bless the Lord light and darkness:
sing his praise and exalt him for ever.

Bless the Lord frost and cold:
bless the Lord you ice and snow;

bless the Lord lightnings and clouds:
sing his praise and exalt him for ever.

O let the earth bless the Lord:
bless the Lord you mountains and hills;

bless the Lord all that grows in the ground:
sing his praise and exalt him for ever.

Bless the Lord you springs:
bless the Lord you seas and rivers;

bless the Lord you whales and all that swim in the waters:
sing his praise and exalt him for ever.

Bless the Lord all birds of the air:
bless the Lord you beasts and cattle;

bless the Lord all people on earth:
sing his praise and exalt him for ever.

O people of God bless the Lord:
bless the Lord you priests of the Lord;

bless the Lord you servants of the Lord:
sing his praise and exalt him for ever.

Bless the Lord all you of upright spirit:
bless the Lord you that are holy and humble in heart.

== Musical settings ==
The Benedicite has often been set to music, including by Ralph Vaughan Williams (1929) and by Andrew Carter in his Benedicite (1991).
