= Andrew Carter (composer) =

English composer (1939–2026)

- Carter c. 1990
- Born: 13 December 1939; Leicester, England
- Died: 5 January 2026 (aged 86)
- Education: University of Leeds
- Occupations: Choral conductor; Composer; Pedagogue
- Organizations: York Minster; Chapter House Choir

Andrew Carter (13 December 1939 – 5 January 2026) was an English composer, pedagogue, conductor and arranger. Carter conducted choral concerts in Europe, Australia and New Zealand. As a singer at York Minster, he founded the Chapter House Choir and conducted them for 17 years. He was known for choral works such as an arrangement of the carol "A maiden most gentle", his Benedicite and a mass for the tercentenary of St Paul's Cathedral in London. His compositions have been described as well-crafted accessible music building on tradition, with strong melodies respecting the texts.

== Life and career ==
Andrew Carter was born in Leicester on 13 December 1939. His mother was an amateur pianist, and several family members were bell-ringers.

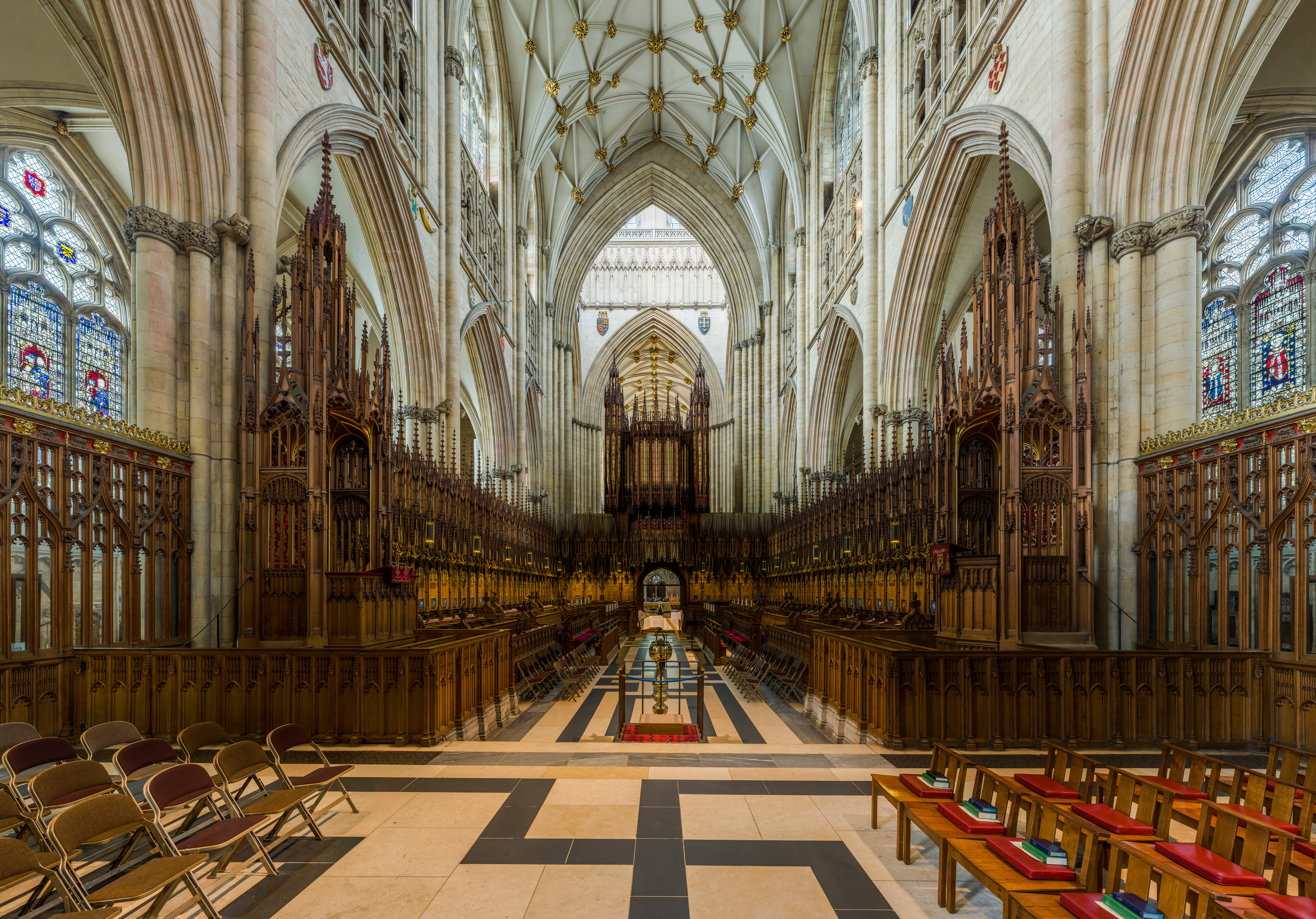
York Minster Choir

He was educated at Kibworth Beauchamp Grammar School and studied piano and organ at the University of Leeds, where he graduated BA in Music in 1961 and gained a Postgraduate Certificate in Education in 1962. At Leeds, he was taught by James Clifford Brown and Philip Wilby. He then moved to York and joined the York Minster choir, at the time conducted by Francis Jackson, as a bass singer in 1962. The position, at the Minster uniquely named "songman", involved singing every day except Wednesday. He also worked there as a music teacher, gaining experience in choral conducting. He founded the Chapter House Choir, a mixed voice ensemble at the Minster, in 1965. They held candle-light concerts at the chapter house after which they were named, including handbells. He directed them for 17 years, achieving national recognition and several prizes in the BBC's Let the Peoples Sing competition. One of the singers in the group was Lynne Dawson.

In 1981, Carter held a Winston Churchill fellowship to study the choral music of Scandinavia and in particular the work of the Swedish conductor and choirmaster Eric Ericson.

In 1984, he spent a year in New Zealand, conducting the Auckland Dorian Choir, and the chamber choir of Auckland University. When he returned to York, he focused on composition. Oxford University Press published more than fifty of his compositions over 25 years. The Nine Lessons and Carols service with the Choir of King's College, Cambridge, broadcast annually by the BBC, has included several of his carols, including his arrangement of "A maiden most gentle" and Mary's Magnificat. A review by John Quinn of the CD Andrew Carter's Christmas Carols states that in composing, Carter shared elements with John Rutter, such as writing well-crafted accessible music building on tradition, pleasing to sing and to listen to, with "a good eye for a text and ... strong melodic gifts".

In 1997, Carter was commissioned to write a mass (Missa Sancti Pauli), set for choir and organ, for the tercentenary of St Paul's Cathedral in London. His Benedicite has been performed internationally. Horizons and Musick's Jubilee were written for British choirs, while he wrote a Te Deum and the Mary's Magnificat for American Lutheran choirs. In 2007, he composed a 22-variation passacaglia and fugue for organ, for the 90th birthday of the former York Minster organist Francis Jackson, which was premiered at the Minster.

He conducted choral concerts in Europe, Australia and New Zealand, and gave workshops at his home and abroad.

Matthew Greenall's article on Carter in Grove Music Online calls his work "characteristically crisp, incisive and energetic". It often uses toccata figuration in the pipe organ parts. Both in Britain and the United States, Carter became one of the most often-performed composers of choral music of his generation.

=== Personal life ===
In 1969, Carter married Sylvia Beard, and they had one son and one daughter, who became a professional mezzo-soprano.

He died on 5 January 2026, at the age of 86.

== Compositions and arrangements ==
=== Choral works ===
==== Major works ====
- Benedicite (1989)
- Laudate Dominum (Psalm 148, 1998)
- Te Deum
- Musick's Jubilee
- Horizons
- Missa Sancti Pauli
- O Mistress Mine (2005)

==== Anthems ====
A book of anthems was published by Oxford University Press, including:

- God be in my head
- The Light of the World
- Go before us, O Lord
- Dear Lord and Father
- The Lord is my shepherd
- Deep Peace
- Mary's Magnificat
- An Affirmation
- May the mystery of God enfold us
- Rejoice in the Lord Alway

==== Christmas carols ====
- "Chanticleer Carol
- "Sweet Was the Song the Virgin Sang"
- "I Come from Highest Heaven"
- "Hodie Christus natus est
- "The Morning Star"
- "There Is No Rose"
- "Make We Merry on This Fest"
- "Song of Stillness"
- "O how joyfully"

==== Arrangements ====
Arrangements, mostly of Christmas carols, include:

- "A Maiden Most Gentle"
- "Hodie Christus natus est"
- "Nightingale Carol"
- "Angelus ad Virginem"
- "I Wonder as I Wander"
- "Tomorrow Shall Be My Dancing Day"
- "Personent hodie"
- "Spanish Lullaby"
- "Down in Yon Forest"
- "O Come, O Come Emmanuel
- "Spanish Carol"
- "Polish Carol"
- "Cétait la veill' de Noé"
- "Austrian Yodel Carol"
- "Stille Nacht"

=== Organ works ===
- Organ Concerto (2008)
- Canon on Forest Green
- Toccata on Veni Emmanuel
- Passacaglia and Fugue (2007)

=== Other works ===
- A Little Suite for Heather for treble recorder and piano
