= Psalm 148 (Bernstein) =

Composition for voice and piano by Leonard Bernstein

- Art song by Leonard Bernstein
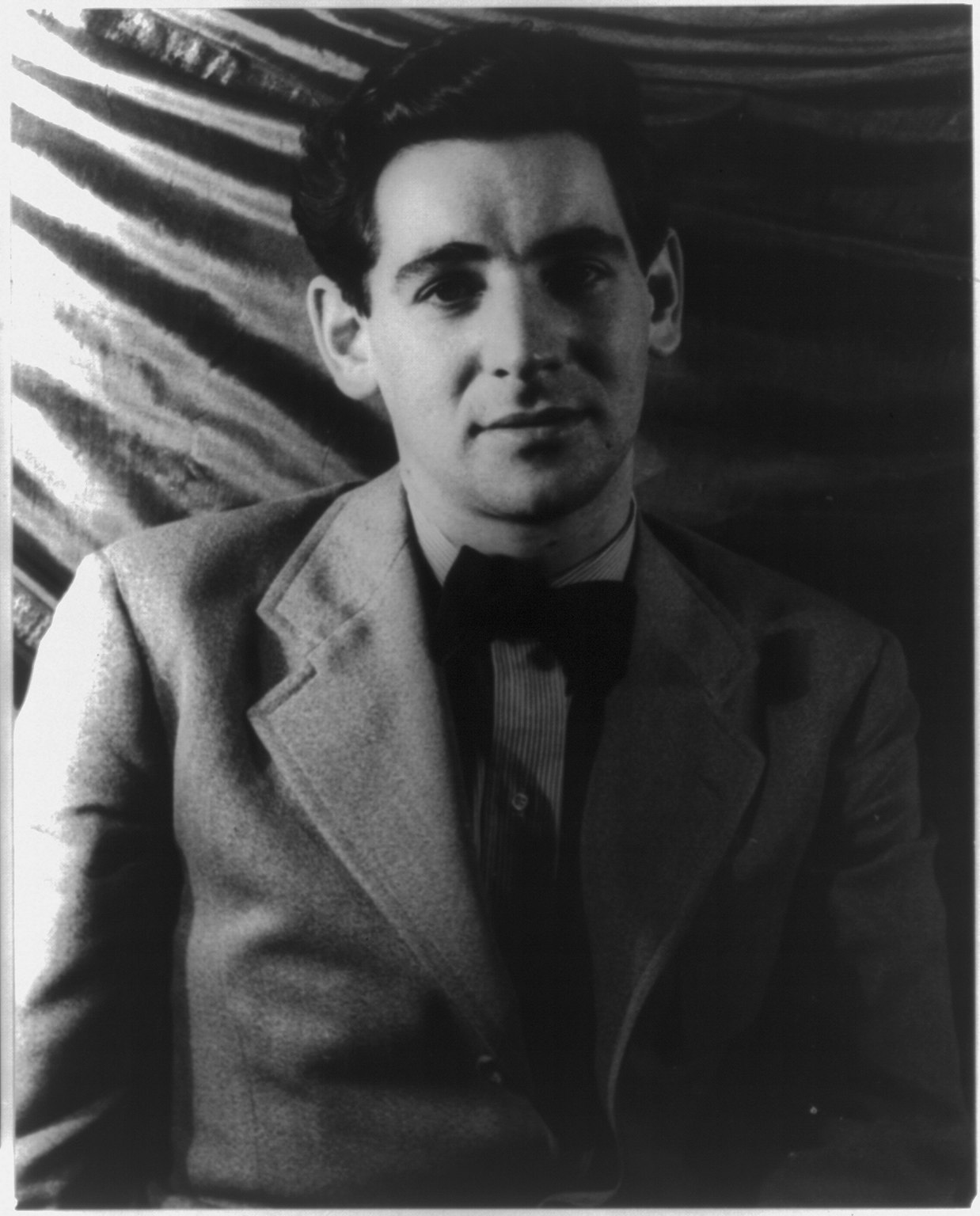
- The composer in 1944
- Text: Psalm 148, adapted by Bernstein
- Language: English
- Composed: 1935
- Performed: 1993
- Published: 2012
- Duration: 4 min.
- Scoring: voice; piano

Psalm 148 is a composition for voice and piano by Leonard Bernstein, a setting of Psalm 148 in English dated 1935. The art song is the composer's earliest surviving work, influenced by the music at the synagogue where he worshiped. He adapted the psalm text to metered poetry, and composed the work in a traditional fashion. He rediscovered the song in the 1980s, and it was first performed and recorded in 1993, and published by Boosey & Hawkes for soprano and piano.

== Background ==
Bernstein knew psalms singing from worshiping regularly at Temple Mishkan Tefila in Roxbury, Boston. The synagogue, with the second largest organ in Boston and with Solomon Braslavsky (1887–1975) as music director, was Bernstein's earliest musical experience. He would recognize Braslavsky as an influential mentor for life.

writing in a 1964 letter to the Cantors Assembly of America:

Before I ever heard a concert, recital, or opera, before I had ever touched a piano, or knew that an organized musical life existed — before all these, I heard the music that Professor Braslavsky caused to be made at Temple Mishkan Tefila. I shall never forget that music, nor cease to be grateful for the power, conviction and atmosphere with which it was conveyed.

Bernstein composed his setting of Psalm 148 in English for voice and piano as a young man, recalling later that it was between 1932 and 1935. He dated it on September 5, 1935, when he was age 17. Choosing English over the original Hebrew may indicate that he thought of a wider audience than the synagogue. It is suitable also for concert and church. Psalm 148 is his earliest surviving work, and became his first composition to later be published. He rediscovered it in the mid-1980s. The song was first performed by mezzo-soprano Angelina Réaux and pianist Barry Snyder at the Eastman School of Music on May 1, 1993. It was published by Boosey & Hawkes in 2012, now for soprano and piano, giving a duration of 4 minutes.

== Structure ==
Bernstein adapted the text from Psalm 148 to meter and rhyme. He structured it in two sections, slow and more moving, each introduced by the piano alone. The composition ends with Hallelujah.

1. Praise ye the Lord, praise Him all the earth
2. Beast of the field

A reviewer noted that the piano introduction was reminiscent of Wagner's Tannhäuser, and that "the song slides easily between Grieg and drawing room Victoriana". Another reviewer noted that Bernstein had a sense of "effective voice-leading", writing "an old-fashioned melody", but knowing how to reach the "right note at its emotional peak".

== Recordings ==
The first performance and recording of Psalm 148 was made by Angelina Réaux and Barry Snyder in 1993. It was included in a 2003 collection, Jewish Legacy, of the composer's works with Jewish background, and in 2006 in the series Milken Archive of American Jewish Music.
