= Gott, wie dein Name, so ist auch dein Ruhm, BWV 171 =

Church cantata by Johann Sebastian Bach

Gott, wie dein Name, so ist auch dein Ruhm
- BWV 171
- Church cantata by J. S. Bach
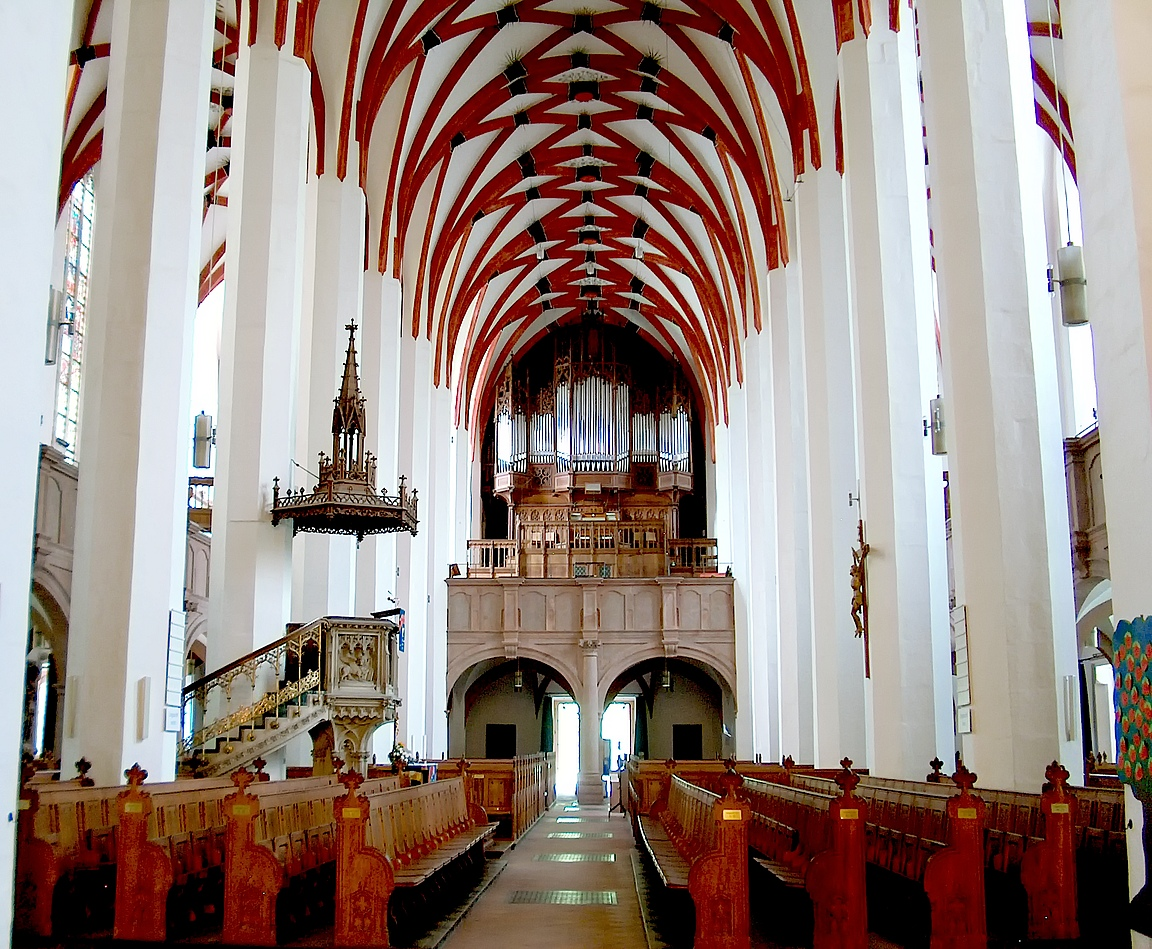
- Thomaskirche, Leipzig
- Related: Patrem omnipotentem of the Mass in B minor
- Occasion: New Year's Day
- Cantata text: Picander
- Bible text: Psalm 48:10
- Chorale: "Jesu, nun sei gepreiset" by Johannes Hermann
- Performed: 1 January 1729?: Leipzig
- Movements: 6
- Vocal: SATB choir and solo
- Instrumental: 3 trumpets; timpani; 2 oboes; 2 violins; viola; continuo

Gott, wie dein Name, so ist auch dein Ruhm (God, as Your name is, so is also Your praise), BWV 171, (Note: "BWV" is Bach-Werke-Verzeichnis, a thematic catalogue of Bach's works.) is a church cantata by Johann Sebastian Bach. He composed it in Leipzig for New Year's Day and probably first performed it on 1 January 1729.

Bach composed the cantata years after the complete cantata cycles from the beginning of his tenure as Thomaskantor in Leipzig in 1723. The text by Picander appeared in a 1728 collection of texts for all occasions of the liturgical year. The feast day also celebrated the circumcision and naming of Jesus. Picander focused on the naming, beginning with a psalm verse mentioning God's name. He used for the conclusion the second stanza from Johannes Hermann's hymn "Jesu, nun sei gepreiset".

Bach structured the cantata in six movements, an opening choral fugue, alternating arias and recitatives and closing chorale. He scored the work for four vocal soloists, a four-part choir and a festive Baroque instrumental ensemble of three trumpets and timpani, two oboes, strings and continuo. The oboes and strings play with the voices in motet style in the choral sections, while the trumpets add the style of a new time. The cantata is part of Bach's Picander cycle.

== Background and words ==
Bach had taken up his tenure as Thomaskantor in Leipzig in 1723. During his first year there he composed a first cantata cycle for almost all occasions of the liturgical year. The second year he composed a cycle of mostly chorale cantatas, based on Lutheran hymns. The third year, Bach began a third cycle but wrote the works more irregularly. Gott, wie dein Name, so ist auch dein Ruhm was from a later incomplete cycle, which the Bach scholar Christoph Wolff calls the Picander cycle, after the librettist Picander with whom Bach had collaborated already for the St Matthew Passion, and worked together for several years. The preface of Picander's 1728 collection of cantata texts written for Bach said that "lack of poetic elegance would be compensated for by the sweetness of the incomparable Kapellmeister Bach".

The cantata was composed for New Year's Day. The prescribed readings for the feast day, which also celebrated the naming of Jesus eight days after his birth, were from the Epistle to the Galatians, "by faith we inherit" (Galatians 3:23–29), and from the Gospel of Luke, the Circumcision and naming of Jesus (Luke 2:21). The text was written by Picander and published in 1728 in a collection of texts for all occasions of the liturgical year. Picander included for the first movement a verse from Psalm 48 (Psalms 48:10 in the King James version, otherwise verse 11). He used as the closing chorale the second stanza from Johannes Hermann's hymn "Jesu, nun sei gepreiset". Picander's poetry is focused on the name of Jesus, similarly to Bach's later cantata for the same occasion, Part IV of his Christmas Oratorio. The biblical quotation from the Old Testament already mentions the name of God. The first recitative adds the thought that the name of Jesus is a gift for the New Year. The second aria contemplates that the name of Jesus, being the first word in the new year, should also be the last in the hour of death. The last recitative refers to John 16:23, of Jesus saying: "Whatsoever ye shall ask the Father in my name, he will give it you." The final movement combines prayers and hopes for the new year.

Bach led the Thomanerchor in the first performance. The earliest possible date is 1 January 1729, but it could have been also around 1736-1737.

== Music ==
=== Structure and scoring ===
Bach structured the cantata in six movements. An opening chorus and a closing chorale frame a sequence of alternating arias and recitatives. Bach scored the work for four vocal soloists (soprano (S), alto (A), tenor (T), bass (B)), a four-part choir and a festive Baroque instrumental ensemble of three trumpets (Tr) and timpani (Ti), two oboes (Ob), two violins (Vl), viola (Va), and basso continuo. The heading of the autograph score reads: "J.J. Festo Circumcisionis Xsi. Concerto . à 4 Voci. 3 Trombe, Tamburi, 2 Hautb. 2 Violini, Viola e Contin: di Bach", which means "Jesus help. Feast of the circumcision of Christ. Concerto for 4 voices, 3 trumpets, timpani, 2 oboes, 2 violins, viola and continuo". A typical duration is about 22 minutes.

In the following table of the movements, the scoring follows the Neue Bach-Ausgabe. The keys and time signatures are taken from the book on all cantatas by the Bach scholar Alfred Dürr, using the symbols for common time (4/4) and alla breve (2/2). The continuo, playing throughout, is not shown.

Movements of Gott, wie dein Name, so ist auch dein Ruhm, BWV 171
No.	Title	Text	Type	Vocal	Winds	Strings	Key	Time
1	Gott, wie dein Name, so ist auch dein Ruhm	Psalm	Chorus	SATB	3Tr Ti 2Ob	2Vl Va	D major	2/4
2	Herr, so weit die Wolken gehn	Picander	Aria	T		2Vl	A major	common time
3	Du süßer Jesus-Name du	Picander	Recitative	A				common time
4	Jesus soll mein erstes Wort	Picander	Aria	S		Vl solo	D major	12/8
5	Und da du, Herr, gesagt	Picander	Recitative	B	2Ob		A major	3/8
6	Laß uns das Jahr vollbringen	Herman	Chorale	SATB	3Tr Ti 2Ob	2Vl Va	B minor	3/4

=== Movements ===
==== 1 ====
The first movement, "Gott, wie dein Name, so ist auch dein Ruhm bis an der Welt Ende." (God, as Your name is, so also Your praise is to the ends of the world.), deals with universal praise of God's name is a choral fugue. While the trumpets are independent, the strings and oboes mostly double the voices in the style of Bach's motets. The first trumpet even plays the fugue theme. The Bach scholar Alfred Dürr argues that the work is probably no new composition but the reworking of an older lost movement, which forms the basis of both this movement and the later second part of the Credo of this music to the Mass in B minor, Patrem omnipotentem, factorem coeli et terrae ([I believe in the] almighty father, maker of Heaven and Earth). The idea of both is the "world-embracing almighty power of God".

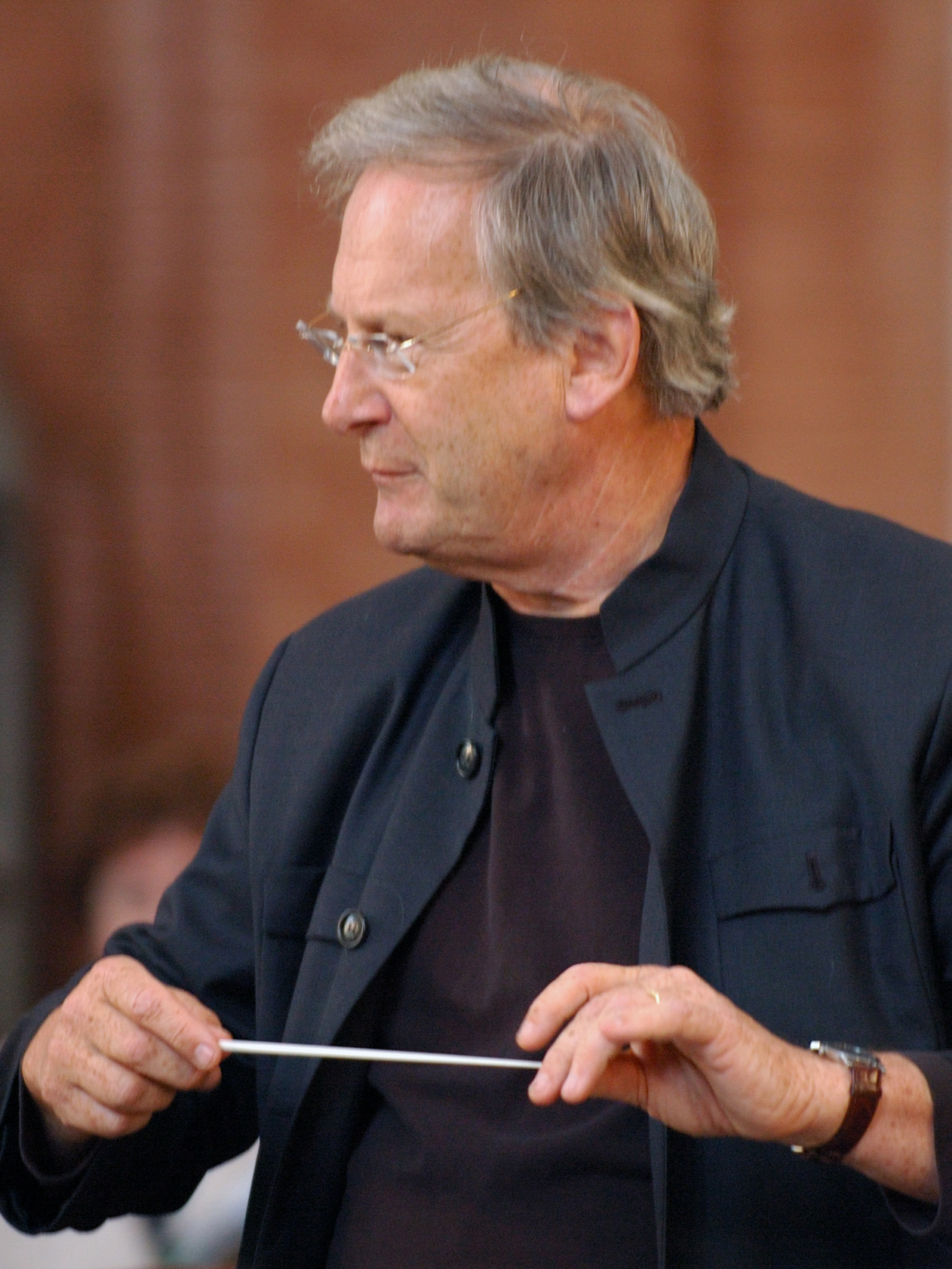
John Eliot Gardiner, who conducted the Bach Cantata Pilgrimage, in 2007

John Eliot Gardiner, who conducted the Bach Cantata Pilgrimage in 2000, summarized:

there is something old-fashioned and motet-like about the way the fugue unfolds with colla parte strings and oboes doubling. But then after twenty-three bars Bach brings in his first trumpet for a glittering restatement of the theme and the music suddenly acquires a new lustre and seems propelled forwards to a different era for this assertion of God's all-encompassing dominion and power.

==== 2 ====
The tenor aria, "Herr, so weit die Wolken gehen" (Lord, as far as the clouds stretch), is accompanied by two instruments not specified in the manuscript score, perhaps violins, according to the range.

==== 3 ====
An alto recitative, "Du süßer Jesus-Name du" (O You sweet name of Jesus), is secco. The musicologist Julian Mincham notes the development from the initial F-sharp minor, illustrating "introverted contemplation", to "confident assertion" in D major.

==== 4 ====
The soprano aria, "Jesus soll mein erstes Wort in dem neuen Jahre heißen" (Jesus shall be my first word uttered in the new year), is a parody of an aria from the secular Zerreißet, zersprenget, zertrümmert die Gruft, BWV 205, in which a virtuoso solo violin represents a gentle wind, while in the church cantata solo it serves the praise of the name Jesus.

==== 5 ====
A tripartite bass recitative, "Und da du, Herr, gesagt" (And as You, Lord, have said), begins as an arioso, only accompanied by the continuo, leading to prayers, accompanied by two oboes, concluding in an arioso with the oboes.

==== 6 ====
The final chorale,"Laß uns das Jahr vollbringen" (Let us complete the year), is taken from Jesu, nun sei gepreiset, BWV 41, written for the same occasion in 1725. While the earlier cantata used the third stanza, this one has a setting of the second and is transposed up a step. It matches the opening chorus with a support of the voices by oboes and strings, while trumpets and timpani play interludes which add weight to the movement.

== Recordings ==
The entries are taken from the listing on the Bach-Cantatas website. Instrumental groups playing period instruments in historically informed performances are marked green under the header Instr..

Recordings of Gott, wie dein Name, so ist auch dein Ruhm
Title	Conductor / Choir / Orchestra	Soloists	Label	Year	Instr.
J. S. Bach: Cantatas BWV 171 & BWV 127	Wolfgang Gönnenwein Süddeutscher Madrigalchor South West German Chamber Orchestra	Herrad Wehrung; Emmy Lisken; Georg Jelden; Jakob Stämpfli	Cantate	1961	
Die Bach Kantate Vol. 20	Helmuth Rilling Gächinger Kantorei Bach-Collegium Stuttgart	Arleen Augér; Julia Hamari; Aldo Baldin; Walter Heldwein	Hänssler	1983	
Bach Cantatas Vol. 1 – Advent and Christmas	Karl Richter Münchener Bach-Chor Münchener Bach-Orchester	Edith Mathis; Hertha Töpper; Peter Schreier; Dietrich Fischer-Dieskau	Archiv Produktion	1971	
J. S. Bach: Das Kantatenwerk • Complete Cantatas • Les Cantates, Folge / Vol. 40 – BWV 170–174	Nikolaus Harnoncourt Tölzer Knabenchor Concentus Musicus Wien	soloist of the Tölzer Knabenchor; Kurt Equiluz; Robert Holl	Teldec	1987	Period
Bach Edition Vol. 12 – Cantatas Vol. 6	Pieter Jan Leusink Holland Boys Choir Netherlands Bach Collegium	Ruth Holton; Sytse Buwalda; Marcel Beekman; Bas Ramselaar	Brilliant Classics	1999	Period
Bach Cantatas Vol. 17: Berlin / For New Year’s Day / For the Sunday after New Year	John Eliot Gardiner Monteverdi Choir English Baroque Soloists	Ruth Holton; Lucy Ballard; James Gilchrist; Peter Harvey	Soli Deo Gloria	2000	Period
J. S. Bach: Complete Cantatas Vol. 19	Ton Koopman Amsterdam Baroque Orchestra & Choir	Sandrine Piau; Bogna Bartosz; Christoph Prégardien; Klaus Mertens	Antoine Marchand	2003	Period
J. S. Bach: Cantatas Vol. 49 – BWV 156, 159, 171, 188	Masaaki Suzuki Bach Collegium Japan	Rachel Nicholls; Robin Blaze; Gerd Türk; Peter Kooy	BIS	2010	Period

== Sources ==
- Gott, wie dein Name, so ist auch dein Ruhm, BWV 171: Scores at the International Music Score Library Project
- Gott, wie dein Name, so ist auch dein Ruhm BWV 171; BC A 24 / Sacred cantata (New Year/Circumcision) Bach Digital
- BWV 171 Gott, wie dein Name, so ist auch dein Ruhm: English translation, University of Vermont
- Luke Dahn: BWV 171.6 bach-chorales.com
