= Dance in mythology and religion =

Dance is present in mythology and religion globally. Dance has certainly been an important part of ceremony, rituals, celebrations and entertainment since before the birth of the earliest human civilizations. Archeology delivers traces of dance from prehistoric times such as the 5,000-year-old Bhimbetka rock shelters paintings in India and Egyptian tomb paintings depicting dancing figures from c. 3300 BC.

One of the earliest structured uses of dances may have been in the performance and in the telling of myths. It was also sometimes used to show feelings for one of the opposite gender. It is also linked to the origin of "love making." Before the production of written languages, dance was one of the methods of passing these stories down from generation to generation.

Another early use of dance may have been as a precursor to ecstatic trance states in healing rituals. Dance is still used for this purpose by many cultures from the Brazilian rainforest to the Kalahari Desert.

An early manuscript describing dance is the Natya Shastra on which is based the modern interpretation of classical Indian dance (e.g. Bharathanatyam).

== Greek mythology ==
In a classical Greek song, Apollo, the god of medicine, music and poetry, one of the twelve greater gods and son of the chief god Zeus, was called The Dancer. In a Greek line Zeus himself is represented as dancing. Terpsichore is one of the nine Muses, representing dancing and dramatic chorus. In Sparta, a province of ancient Greece, the law compelled parents to exercise their children in dancing from the age of five years. They were led by grown men, and sang hymns and songs as they danced. In very early times a Greek chorus, consisting of the whole population of the city, would meet in the market-place to offer up thanksgivings to the god of the country. Their jubilees were always attended with hymn-singing and dancing.

== Dance in scriptures ==
The Torah, the Psalms, and many other scriptures reference dance:

Old Testament

- A Time to Dance:
  - Ecclesiastes 3:4
- Social Dance in celebration of what God has done:
  - Exodus 15:20;
  - Judges 21:21 - 23
- In celebration before the Lord:
  - 2 Samuel 6:14-16;
  - 1 Chronicles 15:29
- Social dancing in celebration of a god:
  - Exodus 32:19;
  - 1 Kings 18:26 (The act of celebrating a false god is condemned here)
- A child's dance:
  - Judges 11:34;
  - Job 21:11
- Celebration of warriors:
  - 1 Samuel 18:6-7;
  - 1 Samuel 21:11;
  - 1 Samuel 29:5;
- As an expression of happiness:
  - Psalm 30:11;
  - Lamentations 5:15;
- In Worship to the Lord:
  - Psalm 149:3;
  - Psalm 150:4
- Social Dance with Friends:
  - Jeremiah 31:4;
  - Jeremiah 31:13
- A Lovers Dance:
  - Song of Solomon 6:13

New Testament

- Social Dance with Friends:
  - Luke 15:25
- Jesus uses dance as a metaphor
  - Matthew 11:17
  - Luke 7:32
- For the king:
  - Matthew 14:6 and Mark 6:22

=== Hindu scriptures ===
From a Hindu point of view, the whole Universe is being brought into existence as the manifestation of the dance of the Supreme Dancer, Nataraja. In the Hindu scriptures, every god has his or her own style (lasya and tandava respectively represent two aspects of dance) we read about 23 celestial beings called Apsarases who dance to please the gods and express the supreme truths in the magic of movement.

The dance in the Hinduism used to be a part of a sacred temple ritual, especially in South and Eastern India, where the female priestesses devadasi's worshiped different aspects of the Divine through the elaborate language of mime and gestures. Natyashastra is the most ancient and the most elaborate scripture describing every element and aspect of this sacred art-worship.

The temple dance gradually evolved into what is known today as the South Indian Classical Dance that still preserves many ritualistic elements of Hinduism. Some of the classical Indian dancers are believed to be incarnations of apsaras.

=== Buddhism ===
See Seungmu

=== Chinese mythology ===
- Lion dance

=== Christianity ===
In the Protoevangelium of James, it is reported that Mary danced before the Ark of the Covenant in the Temple of Jerusalem at the time of her presentation.

Throughout the history of Christianity, several denominations and independent congregations prohibited social dancing for various reasons; however, dance has always been a part of the social life of many Christians. Christian lyrics are found in the sounds of Ballroom, Country, Rock and Roll, Latin, Night Club, and other dance music. Ballet originated in Italy at weddings.

Numerous examples of traditional dance can be found in modern Roman Catholic communities. The Brazilian dance and martial art of capoeira (particularly capoeira angola) is regularly performed—including between capoeiristas of different sexes—to lyrics and ladinhas (litanies) praising God, the saints, and the Virgin. In a similar vein, several genres of dance music in Romani people/Romani culture involve religious themes and lyrics. In the Philippines, the Subli—a devotional dance of the Catholic Tagalogs in Batangas Province—honours the True Cross. Finally, the celebrations of Carnival and Mardi Gras feature dance.

Many Charismatic and Pentecostal Protestant denominations practice dance during worship services. Congregants frequently dance during services as an act of worship. Some Charismatics practice prophetic dance, a religious practice in which practitioners believe they are representing what the Lord is doing through their movements. This is often accompanied with banners, ribbons and, instruments. Bethel Church in Redding, California has a school where people who wished to be trained in prophetic dance can go.

=== Hawaiian mythology ===
- Hula

== See also ==
- History of dance
- Outline of dance
- Ceremonial dance
- Dances of Universal Peace
- Holy roller
