= Herr Gott, dich loben wir, BWV 16 =

Church cantata by Johann Sebastian Bach

Herr Gott, dich loben wir
- BWV 16
- Church cantata by J. S. Bach
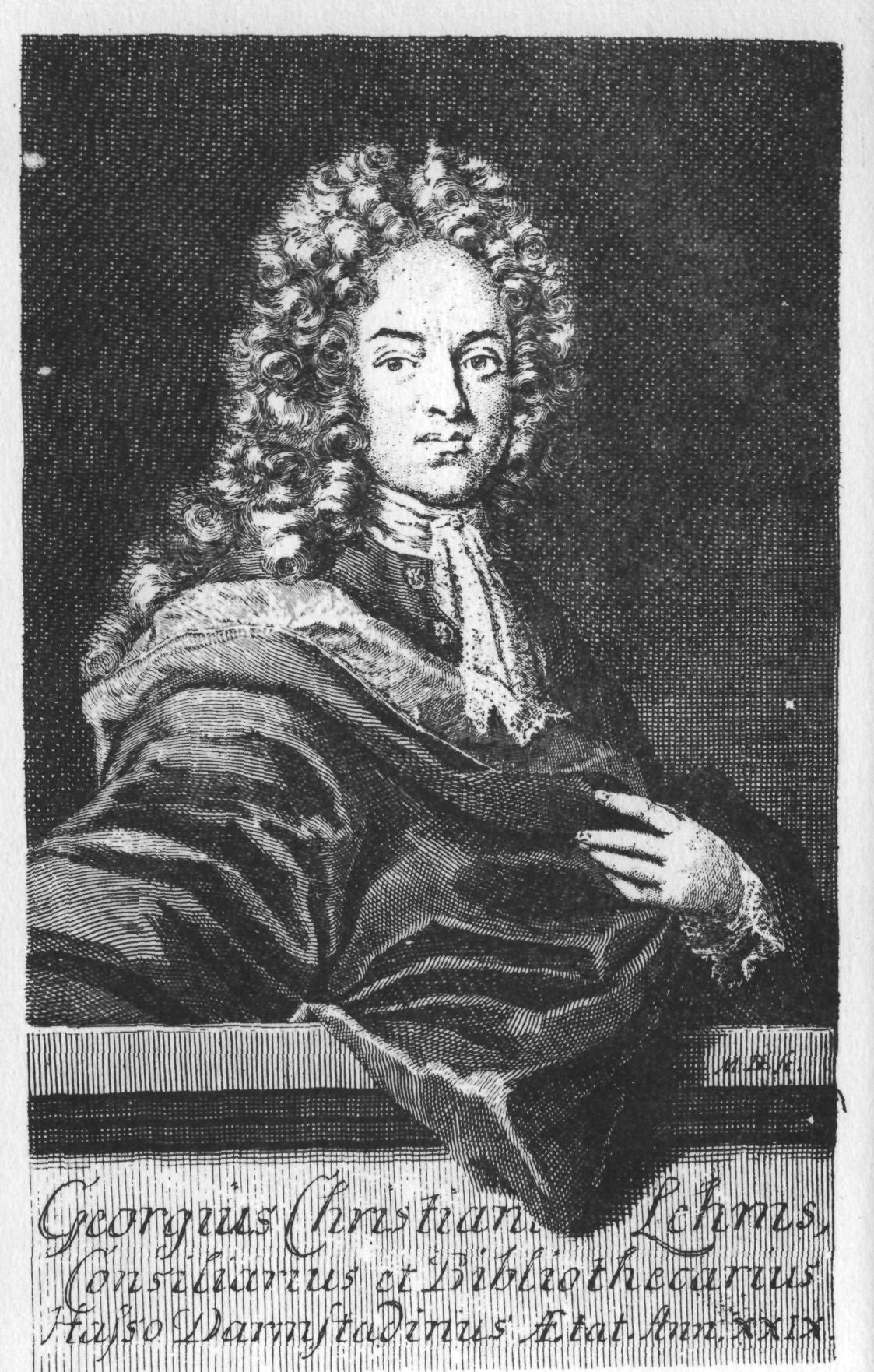
- Lehms, the librettist
- Occasion: New Year's Day
- Cantata text: Georg Christian Lehms
- Chorale: "Herr Gott, dich loben wir" by Paul Eber
- Performed: 1 January 1726: Leipzig
- Movements: 6
- Vocal: SATB choir; alto, tenor and bass solo
- Instrumental: corno da caccia; 2 oboes; oboe da caccia; 2 violins; viola; violetta; continuo

Herr Gott, dich loben wir (Lord God, we praise You), BWV 16, is a church cantata for New Year's Day by Johann Sebastian Bach. It was first performed on 1 January 1726 in Leipzig, as part of the composer's third cantata cycle. Its libretto is by Georg Christian Lehms, as for three other of Bach's cantatas for the Christmas season that started with Unser Mund sei voll Lachens, BWV 110 on Christmas Day. He opened his text with the beginning of "Herr Gott, dich loben wir", Luther's German Te Deum, and continued with expressing thanks for the completed year and prayers for future blessing. The cantata is closed with a stanza from Paul Eber's "Helft mir Gotts Güte preisen" for the closing chorale. Bach structured the work in six movements and scored it for three vocal soloists (alto, tenor, and bass), a four-part choir, corno da caccia, oboes, strings and basso continuo. The work features an unusual aria performed by a soloist with the choir.

== History and words ==
Bach composed the cantata in 1726, his third year as Thomaskantor in Leipzig, for New Year's Day, which is also the feast of the circumcision and naming of Jesus. He had composed few new church cantatas in his third year in office, but began a sequence of five cantatas for the 1725/26 Christmas season with Unser Mund sei voll Lachens, BWV 110. For most of them, he set texts by Georg Christian Lehms that had been published in a collection of Andachten (devotions) for the occasions of the liturgical year in 1711, entitled Gottgefälliges Kirchen-Opffer (Church offering pleasing to God). Lehms had written the texts originally for Christoph Graupner, then music director at the Darmstadt court. Bach, then working in Weimar, had set two of them in 1713 as solo cantatas. It is unclear what motivated him to set more of them in 1725. Four of the five cantatas used texts from this collection.

The prescribed readings for the feast day were taken from the Epistle to the Galatians, "Through faith we are heirs by promise" (Galatians 3:23–29), and from the Gospel of Luke, the Circumcision and naming of Jesus (Luke 2:21). The cantata text by Lehms is focused on praise and thanksgiving without being related to the readings. The poet began with four lines from Martin Luther's German Te Deum, "Herr Gott, dich loben wir" (Lord God, we praise you). The following pair of recitative and aria deal with thanks for past gifts, while a further pair deals with a prayer for further blessings. The poet did not supply a closing chorale, but Bach chose the final stanza of Paul Eber's "Helft mir Gotts Güte preisen" (Help me to praise God's goodness) (c. 1580).

Bach first performed the cantata on 1 January 1726.

== Music ==
=== Structure and scoring ===
Bach structured the cantata in six movements. The outer movements—the opening chorus and the closing chorale—are sung by the choir, and frame a sequence of alternating recitatives and arias. The work is scored for three vocal soloists (alto (A), tenor (T), bass (B)), a four-part choir and a festive Baroque instrumental ensemble of corno da caccia (Co), two oboes (Ob), oboe da caccia (Oc), two violins (Vl), viola (Va), violetta (alternative in a later performance) and basso continuo. Alfred Dürr, in his Die Kantaten von Johann Sebastian Bach, gave the duration as 21 minutes.

In the following table, the scoring follows the Neue Bach-Ausgabe. The keys and time signatures are taken from Dürr, using the symbols for common time (4/4). The continuo, playing throughout, is not shown.

Movements of Herr Gott, dich loben wir
No.	Title	Text	Type	Vocal	Winds	Strings	Key	Time
1	Herr Gott, dich loben wir	Luther	Chorus	SATB	2Ob Co	2Vl Va	A minor	common time
2	So stimmen wir bei dieser frohen Zeit	Lehms	Recitative	B				common time
3	Laßt uns jauchzen, laßt uns freuen	Lehms	Aria	B SATB	2Ob Co	2Vl Va	C major	common time
4	Ach treuer Hort	Lehms	Recitative	A				common time
5	Geliebter Jesu, du allein	Lehms	Aria	T	Oc	Violetta	F major	3/4
6	All solch dein Güt wir preisen	Eber	Chorale	SATB	2Ob Co	2Vl Va	C major	common time

=== Movements ===
==== 1 ====
In the opening chorus, "Herr Gott, dich loben wir" (Lord God, we praise you), the soprano, reinforced by the horn presents the liturgical melody of the Te Deum, whereas the lower voices move in vivid counterpoint, joined by a fourth part of oboe I and violin I. The archaic style of the melody invites a composition in motet style rather than concerto. Bach hints at the traditional antiphonal singing by setting the uneven lines only with continuo, while in the even lines instruments play colla parte with the voices and an independent fifth part is played by oboe and violin.

==== 2 ====
A secco recitative for the bass, "So stimmen wir bei dieser frohen Zeit mit heißer Andacht an" (Thus we resound at this happy time with fervent reverence), ends on the words "O, sollte darum nicht ein neues Lied erklingen und wir in heißer Liebe singen?" (O, should not therefore a new song be heard, and should we not sing in ardent love?).

==== 3 ====
Consequently, the next movement begins attacca (without a break) with the voices' "Laßt uns jauchzen, laßt uns freuen" (Let us celebrate, let us rejoice), to which the bass voice adds: "Gottes Güt und Treu bleibet alle Morgen neu" (God's goodness and faithfulness is renewed every morning). This unusual movement combines elements of chorus and aria in a free da capo form, with the choir repeating its call to rejoice, sometimes in fugal fashion. The first section is dominated by the chorus, the middle section by the bass. The musicologist Julian Mincham points out that it is "an unusual and imaginative combination of aria and chorus" and likens it to the interaction between a pastor and his flock. The Bach scholar Hans-Joachim Schulze notes the "aural splendor" of the "complex, multilevel structure".

==== 4 ====
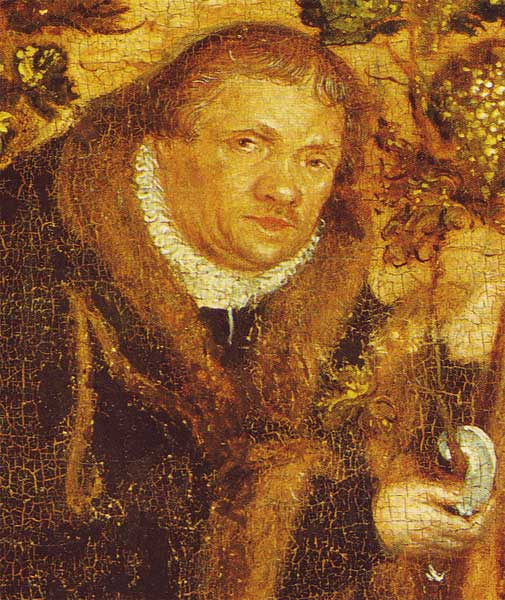
Paul Eber, hymn writer

A secco recitative for the alto turns to prayer for the future: "Ach treuer Hort, beschütz auch fernerhin dein wertes Wort" (O trusted refuge, protect also henceforth your valued word); it is followed by requesting "protection, peace, and growth".

==== 5 ====
A tender tenor aria, "Geliebter Jesu, du allein, sollst meiner Seelen Reichtum sein" (Beloved Jesus, you alone shall be my soul's fortune), was accompanied by an obbligato oboe da caccia in the first 1726 version. In later performances of 1731 and 1740, the obbligato instrument was a "violetta", which can, according to Johann Gottfried Walther, mean a viola or a descant viola da gamba. Schulze notes that the "silver shimmer" of the violetta may hint at the "fortune" and "treasure" of the text, as in other earlier compositions by Bach.

==== 6 ====
The cantata closes with a four-part chorale, "All solch dein Güt wir preisen, Vater ins Himmels Thron" (All such of your goodness we praise, Father on Heaven's throne), described as unpretentious.

== Publication ==
The first critical edition of the cantata, edited by Moritz Hauptmann, was published by the Bach Gesellschaft in 1852 as part of its complete edition of Bach's works. In the Neue Bach-Ausgabe, the second edition of Bach's works, the cantata was published in 1965, edited by Werner Neumann.

Carus published a critical edition in German and English as part of its Stuttgarter Bach-Ausgaben in 2005, edited by Michael Märker.

== Recordings ==
The following table is a selection from Bach Cantatas website, where 14 recordings are listed as of 2025. Instrumental groups playing period instruments in historically informed performances are marked by green background under the header "Instr.".

Recordings of Herr Gott, dich loben wir
Title	Conductor / Choir / Orchestra	Soloists	Label	Year	Instr.
J. S. Bach: Das Kantatenwerk • Complete Cantatas • Les Cantates, Folge / Vol. 1	Gustav Leonhardt: Tölzer Knabenchor; King's College Choir; Leonhardt-Consort	Paul Esswood; Marius van Altena; Max van Egmond	Teldec	1972	Period
Die Bach Kantate Vol. 20	Helmuth Rilling Gächinger Kantorei Bach-Collegium Stuttgart	Gabriele Schreckenbach; Peter Schreier; Philippe Huttenlocher	Hänssler	1981	
Bach Edition Vol. 4 – Cantatas Vol. 1	Pieter Jan Leusink Holland Boys Choir Netherlands Bach Collegium	Sytse Buwalda; Nico van der Meel; Bas Ramselaar	Brilliant Classics	1999	Period
Bach Cantatas Vol. 17: Berlin / For New Year's Day / For the Sunday After New Year	John Eliot Gardiner Monteverdi Choir English Baroque Soloists	Charles Humphries, James Gilchrist; Peter Harvey	Soli Deo Gloria	2000	Period
J. S. Bach: Complete Cantatas Vol. 16	Ton Koopman Amsterdam Baroque Orchestra & Choir	Bogna Bartosz; Paul Agnew; Klaus Mertens	Antoine Marchand	2001	Period
J. S. Bach: Cantatas for the Complete Liturgical Year Vol. 4: "Sie werden aus Saba alle kommen" – Cantatas BWV 16 · 65 · 153 · 154	Sigiswald Kuijken La Petite Bande	Elisabeth Hermans; Petra Noskaiová; Jan Kobow; Jan van der Crabben	Accent	2006	Period
J. S. Bach: Cantatas Vol. 42	Masaaki Suzuki Bach Collegium Japan	Robin Blaze; Gerd Türk; Peter Kooy	BIS	2008	Period
