= Johannes Hermann =

German musician (1515–1593)

Johannes Hermann, also Johann Herrmann, (1515 – 22 April 1593 in Freiberg) was a German church musician, hymn writer and jurist. He held the position of Thomaskantor in Leipzig from 1531 to 1536. He became the first Protestant Kantor of Freiberg, and a jurist in 1540.

== Hymns ==
Johann Sebastian Bach used his hymn "Jesu, nun sei gepreiset", in three stanzas of 14 lines each, for New Year's Day, in three cantatas composed in Leipzig for the occasion, first Singet dem Herrn ein neues Lied, BWV 190 (1724), a year later the chorale cantata Jesu, nun sei gepreiset, BWV 41 (1725), and Gott, wie dein Name, so ist auch dein Ruhm, BWV 171 (1729).
