= Laudate psalms =

The Laudate Psalms are the psalms numbered 148, 149, and 150, traditionally sung all together as one psalm in the canonical hours, most particularly the hour of Lauds, also called "Morning Prayer", which derives its name from these psalms. The psalms themselves are named from the Latin word laudate, or "praise ye", which begins psalms 148 and 150. At Lauds, according to the Roman Rite, they were sung together following the canticle under one antiphon and under one Gloria Patri until the reforms instituted by St. Pius X in 1911.

== See also ==
- Pesukei dezimra, a section of the Jewish morning prayer which contains the same psalms
