= Benedicite (Carter) =

Composition for choir and orchestra

- Choral music by Andrew Carter
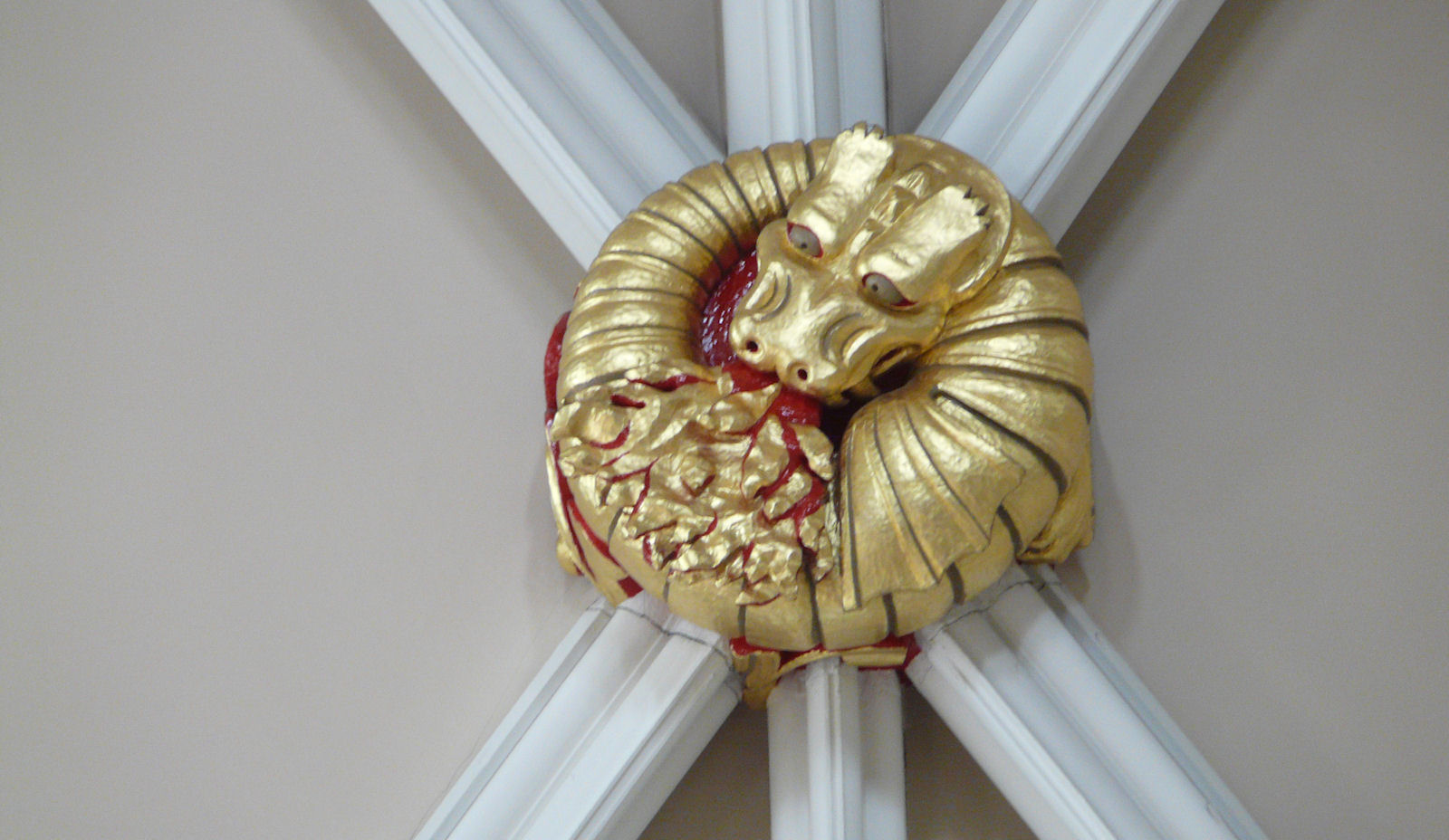
- One of the restored bosses in York Minster which inspired the composition
- Related: Excerpt Bless the Lord
- Language: English
- Based on: Benedicite
- Dedication: Andrew Fairbairns
- Performed: 5 November 1989: Queen's Hall
- Published: 1991: University of Oxford
- Duration: 35:00
- Movements: 9
- Scoring: choir; children's choir; orchestra

Benedicite is a composition for choir, children's choir and orchestra by Andrew Carter. He set the hymn Benedicite from the Book of Common Prayer, and additional free texts based on the model in three movements for unison children's choir. The work was published in 1991 and dedicated to Andrew Fairbairns. A subset of the music for children's choir was published as Bless the Lord.

== History ==
Benedicite was commissioned for the 1989 Singing Day in Edinburgh by the British Federation of Young Choirs. Carter, an English composer and church musician in York, was inspired by the restoration of roof bosses at the southern transept of York Minster, which had been destroyed in a fire in 1984. They depict around 60 images of creatures. The music is written to convey a child-like perspective of the wonders of Creation.

Benedicite was published by Oxford University Press in 1991, dedicated to Andrew Fairbairns. A subset of the music for children's choir was published as Bless the Lord.

== Structure and music ==
Carter set the hymn Benedicite from the Book of Common Prayer in six movements, and interspersed three additional movements, whose texts are free variations on the model, to be sung by a unison children's choir.

The movements are titled:

1. O all ye works of the Lord
2. Green Things
3. Sun and Moon
4. Badgers and Hedgehogs
5. Ice and Snow
6. Whales and Waters
7. Butterflies and Moths
8. Thunder and Lightning
9. Spirits and Souls
10. Grannies and Grandads
11. O let the earth bless the Lord

The duration is given as 35 minutes. The first movement, beginning "O all ye works of the Lord, bless ye the Lord", is marked Molto ritmico (Very rhythmic) and is in 2+2+2+3/8 time.

The three movements based on added text to be sung by a children's choir were also published separately as Bless the Lord, which is concluded with the final movement. The movements are:

- Badgers and Hedgehogs (Benedicite No. 4)
- Butterflies and Moths (Benedicite No. 7)
- Grannies and Grandads (Benedicite No. 10)
- O Let The Earth Bless The Lord

== Performances and recordings ==
The first performance of Benedicite was at the Queen's Hall in Edinburgh on 5 November 1989, conducted by Philip Ledger. The work was recorded, together with Rutter's Requiem, by the Wayne Oratorio Society at Wayne Presbyterian Church on 10 May 2006, conducted by Jeffrey B. Fowler. In 2016, Benedicite was performed, together with Mozart's Great Mass in C minor, at the York Minster by the York Musical Society.
