= Herr Gott, dich loben wir =

1529 Lutheran hymn by Martin Luther

- Hymn by Martin Luther
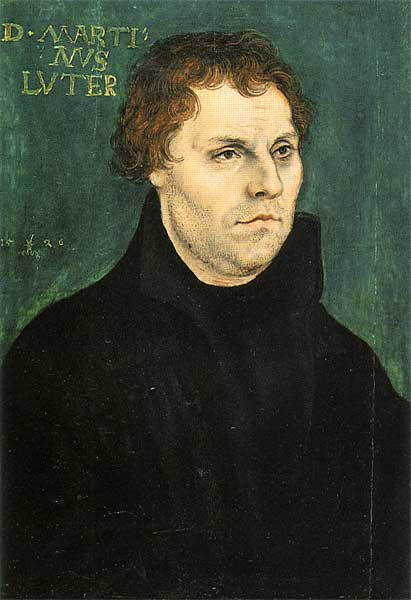
- The author in 1526, wedding picture by Lucas Cranach
- English: Lord God, we praise you
- Catalogue: Zahn 8652
- Text: by Martin Luther
- Language: German
- Based on: Te Deum
- Melody: by Luther, derived from the Te Deum
- Published: 1529

"Herr Gott, dich loben wir" (Lord God, we praise you) is a Lutheran hymn, which Martin Luther wrote in 1529 as a translation and partial paraphrase of the Latin Te Deum. It is sometimes called the German Te Deum. The hymn was first published in 1529. Its hymn tune, Zahn No. 8652, is a simplification of the melody of the traditional Te Deum. It has appeared in 24 hymnals.

== Text and melody ==
Luther translated and slightly expanded the Latin text of the Te Deum, which is also known as the Ambrosian Hymn, but is currently credited to Nicetas of Remesiana, a bishop of the 4th century. Luther wrote 27 verses, intending it for two responsorial groups. The song of praise, thanks and petition is used regularly on festive occasions.

For a melody, Luther used a simplified version of the traditional melody of the early Christian Te Deum. The early tune is based on an evening song of the Greek church, which in turn may go back to early Christian rites or an evening song of the synagogue. Luther's version was first published in Joseph Klug's Geistliche Lieder (Spiritual Songs) in Wittenberg in 1529. No copy of this edition is extant. It has appeared in 24 hymnals.

== Musical settings ==
Johann Hermann Schein composed in 1618 Das Tedeum for four choirs and two instrumental groups ("Capellen"); and in 1627 a setting for four-part choir and continuo.

Johann Sebastian Bach used parts of the text and melody in cantatas for New Year's Day, Singet dem Herrn ein neues Lied, BWV 190, and Herr Gott, dich loben wir, BWV 16.

Felix Mendelssohn composed a setting Herr Gott, dich loben wir (Te Deum) for solo voices, double chorus, four trombones, strings, and organ, first performed at the Berlin Cathedral on 6 August 1843, to mark "the millennium of the founding of the German Reich".

== See also ==
- List of hymns by Martin Luther
