= Singet dem Herrn ein neues Lied =

Lutheran hymn based on Psalm 149

"Sing[e]t dem Herrn ein neues Lied" ("Sing unto the Lord a new song") is a Lutheran hymn in four stanzas by Matthäus Apelles von Löwenstern. The text is based on Psalm 149. The hymn was first published in 1644. Löwenstern is also the composer of its hymn tune, in C major, Zahn No. 6424. Apart from this tune, the 1644 publication also contained a basso continuo accompaniment, to be performed on organ when the hymn was sung. A four-part setting of the hymn by Johann Sebastian Bach, BWV 411, was based on Löwenstern's tune. Bach's setting was first published in 1786.

== Sources ==
- Bach, Carl Philipp Emanuel, ed. (1786). "246. Singet dem Herrn ein neues Lied". Johann Sebastian Bachs vierstimmige Choralgesänge [Johann Sebastian Bach's four-part chorales] (in German). Vol. III. Leipzig: Johann Gottlob Immanuel Breitkopf. p. 143.
- Zahn, Johannes (1891). Die Melodien der deutschen evangelischen Kirchenlieder (in German). Vol. IV. Gütersloh: Bertelsmann. p. 63.
