= Singet dem Herrn ein neues Lied, BWV 190 =

Church cantata by Johann Sebastian Bach

Singet dem Herrn ein neues Lied
- BWV 190
- Church cantata by J. S. Bach
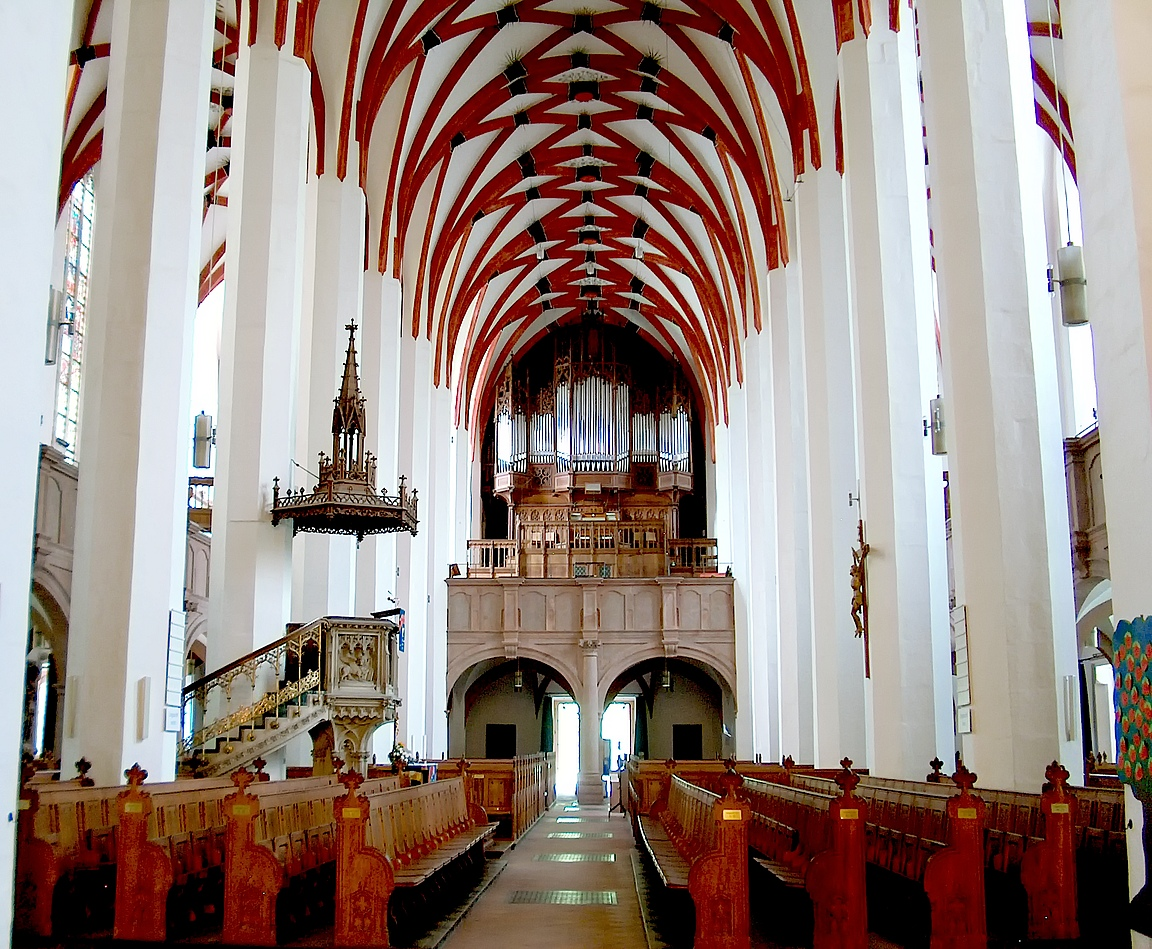
- Thomaskirche, Leipzig
- Related: base for BWV 190a
- Occasion: New Year's Day
- Bible text: Psalms 149:1; Psalms 150:4,6
- Chorale: "Herr Gott, dich loben wir"; by Johannes Hermann
- Performed: 1 January 1724: Leipzig
- Movements: 7
- Vocal: SATB choir; alto, tenor and bass solo
- Instrumental: 3 trumpets; timpani; 3 oboes; oboe d'amore; 2 violins; viola; continuo

Singet dem Herrn ein neues Lied (Sing a new song to the Lord), BWV 190, (Note: "BWV" is Bach-Werke-Verzeichnis, a thematic catalogue of Bach's works.) is a church cantata by Johann Sebastian Bach. He wrote it in Leipzig for the New Year's Day and first performed it on 1 January 1724 as part of his first cantata cycle. He adapted it in 1730 to Singet dem Herrn ein neues Lied, BWV 190a, for the celebration of the bicentennial of the Augsburg Confession.

== History and words ==
Bach wrote the cantata in 1723, his first year as Thomaskantor in Leipzig, for New Year's Day, which is also the Feast of the Circumcision of Christ. The prescribed readings for the feast day were from the Epistle to the Galatians, by faith we inherit (Galatians 3:23–29), and from the Gospel of Luke, the circumcision and naming of Jesus eight days after his birth (Luke 2:21). The unknown poet, possibly Picander, refers only in a general way to the readings: he mentions the naming at the end of movement 4, "Jesu Namen" (name of Jesus), and he starts every line in the following aria with "Jesus". Otherwise the text stresses praise and thanks for the gifts of the past and prayer for further blessings. The poet compiled for the opening chorus a verse from Psalm 149 (Psalms 149:1), three verses from Psalm 150 (Psalms 150:4,6), and in between the first two lines of Martin Luther's "Deutsches Tedeum" (German Te Deum) "Herr Gott, dich loben wir" (Lord God, Thee we praise). The words from the "Te Deum" appear again in the second movement, interspersed by recitative. The closing chorale is the second stanza of Johannes Hermann's "Jesu, nun sei gepreiset" (1591).

Bach first performed the cantata on 1 January 1724. He performed it again in the second half of the 1730s. Probably in Bach's revision process, parts of the original music got lost: for the first two movements only the vocal parts and the violin parts survived. Reconstruction of the missing parts was attempted by Bernhard Todt (1904), Walther Reinhart (1948), Olivier Alain (1971), Diethard Hellmann (1995), Ton Koopman and Levente Gyöngyösi, Masaaki Suzuki and Masato Suzuki.

In his Christmas Oratorio of 1734, Bach dedicated the complete Part IV for New Year's Day to the naming of Jesus, told in the one verse from the Gospel of Luke, first performed on 1 January 1735.

== Scoring and structure ==
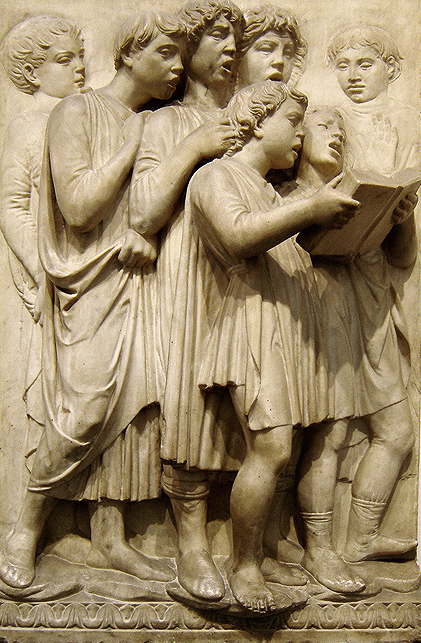
Luca della Robbia: Cantoria, Psalm 150

The cantata in seven movements is festively scored for alto, tenor and bass soloists, a four-part choir, three trumpets, timpani, three oboes, oboe d'amore, two violins, viola, and basso continuo including bassoon. The instrumentation is known from the extant closing chorale, although most parts for the first movements are lost.

1. Chorus: Singet dem Herrn ein neues Lied
2. Chorale and recitative (alto, tenor, bass): Herr Gott, dich loben wir
3. Aria (alto, strings): Lobe, Zion, deinen Gott
4. Recitative (bass): Es wünsche sich die Welt
5. Aria (tenor, bass, oboe d'amore): Jesus soll mein alles sein
6. Recitative (tenor, strings): Nun, Jesus gebe
7. Chorale: Laß uns das Jahr vollbringen

== Music ==
The opening chorus on three psalm verses and two lines from Luther's "Tedeum" is a complex architecture in three sections. A concerto Singet dem Herrn is concluded by the liturgical melody of "Herr Gott, dich loben wir" in unison, a choral fugue "Alles was Odem hat" (Everything that has breath) is concluded by a similar "Herr Gott, wir danken dir", the final section Halleluja is a shortened reprise of the first.

In the second movement, the liturgical melody is set four-part and interrupted by recitatives. The following alto aria is dance-like and simple, the duet is accompanied by an obbligato instrument which may be oboe d'amore or violin. Gardiner tried both, but then chose a viola d'amore instead. Neither movement has a da capo. The strings intensify the prayer of the last recitative. The choir of trumpets marks the ending of every line in the closing chorale.

== Recordings ==
- J. S. Bach: Cantatas BWV 137 & BWV 190, Hans Thamm, Windsbacher Knabenchor, Das Consortium Musicum, Ingeborg Ruß, Peter Schreier, Franz Crass, EMI 1966 (Reinhart reconstruction)
- Die Bach Kantate Vol. 19, Helmuth Rilling, Gächinger Kantorei, Bach-Collegium Stuttgart, Helen Watts, Kurt Equiluz, Niklaus Tüller, Hänssler 1981 (Alain reconstruction)
- J. S. Bach: Complete Cantatas Vol. 6, Ton Koopman, Amsterdam Baroque Orchestra & Choir, Bogna Bartosz, Paul Agnew, Klaus Mertens, Antoine Marchand 1997 (Koopman reconstruction)
- Bach Cantatas Vol. 15: New York, John Eliot Gardiner, Monteverdi Choir, English Baroque Soloists, Daniel Taylor, James Gilchrist, Peter Harvey, Soli Deo Gloria 2000
- J. S. Bach: Cantatas Vol. 21, Masaaki Suzuki, Bach Collegium Japan, Robin Blaze, James Gilchrist, Peter Kooy, BIS 2002

== Sources ==
- Singet dem Herrn ein neues Lied, BWV 190: Scores at the International Music Score Library Project
- Singet dem Herrn ein neues Lied BWV 190; BC A 21 / Sacred cantata (New Year/Circumcision) Bach Digital
- Cantata BWV 190 Singet dem Herrn ein neues Lied!: history, scoring, sources for text and music, translations to various languages, discography, discussion, Bach Cantatas Website
- BWV 190 Singet dem Herrn ein neues Lied: text, scoring, University of Alberta
- Chapter 33 BWV 190 Singet dem Herrn ein neues Lied / Sing with new song to the Lord. Julian Mincham, 2010
- Luke Dahn: BWV 190.7 bach-chorales.com
