= Psalm 148 =

Biblical psalm

- "Praise ye the Lord from the heavens"
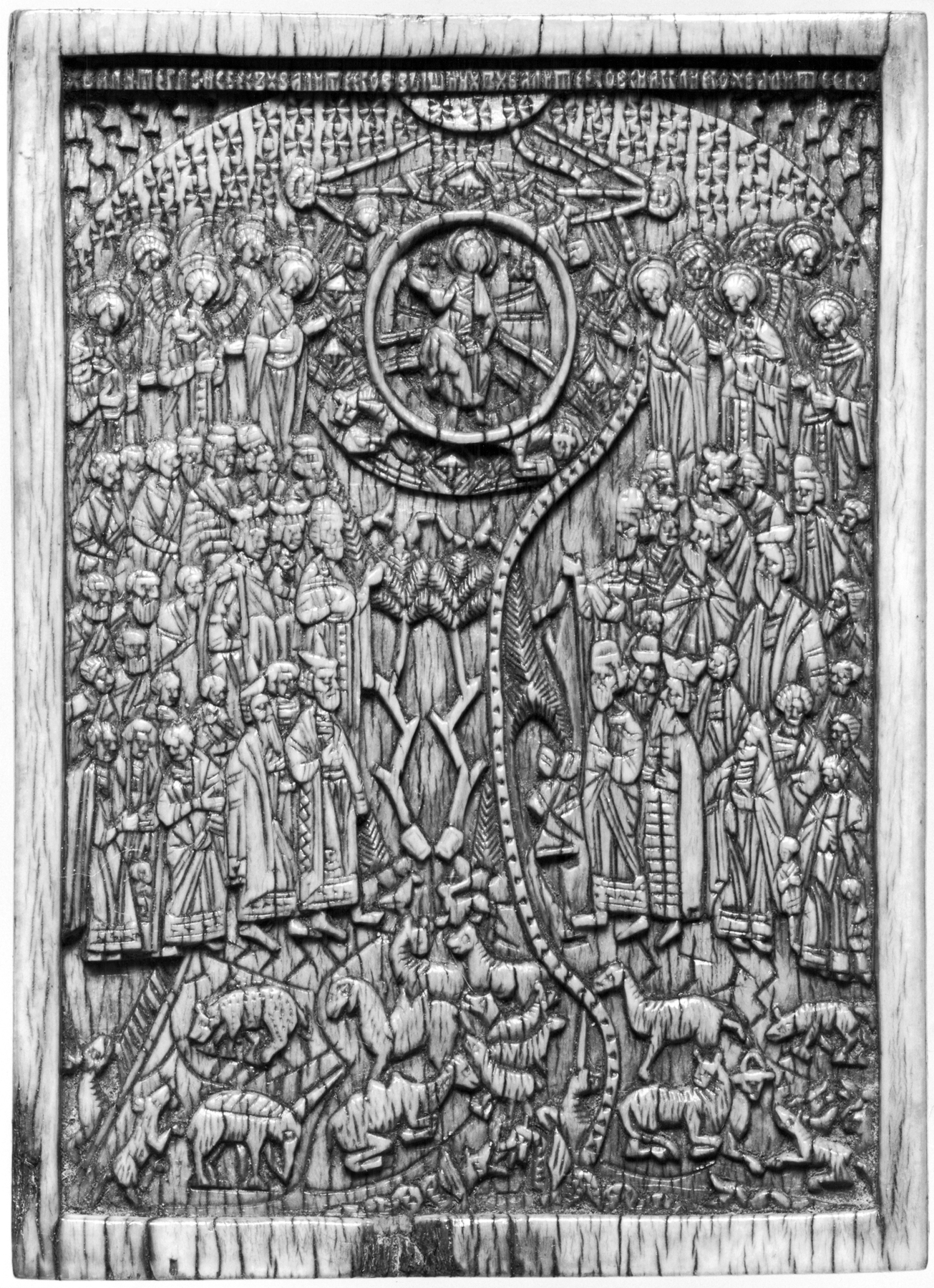
- Praise the Lord from the Heavens, 17th-century Russian ivory carving
- Other name: Psalm 148 (Vulgate); "Laudate Dominum de caelis"
- Language: Hebrew (original)

Psalm 148
- ← Psalm 147 Psalm 149 →
- Book: Book of Psalms
- Hebrew Bible part: Ketuvim
- Order in the Hebrew part: 1
- Category: Sifrei Emet
- Christian Bible part: Old Testament
- Order in the Christian part: 19

Psalm 148 is the 148th psalm of the Book of Psalms, beginning in English in the King James Version: "Praise ye the Lord from the heavens". In Latin, it is known as "Laudate Dominum de caelis". The psalm is one of the Laudate psalms. Old Testament scholars have also classified it as a creation psalm and a wisdom psalm.

The psalm forms a regular part of Jewish, Catholic, Lutheran, Anglican and other Protestant liturgies. It has often been set to music, including a four-part metered setting in German by Heinrich Schütz as part of the Becker Psalter, and Psalm 148, a setting for voice and piano of an English metered adaptation written and composed by Leonard Bernstein in 1935, his earliest surviving work.

== Background and themes ==
In the Septuagint, Psalms 145 to 148 are given the title "of Haggai and Zechariah". This psalm takes in all of God's creations, from the heights of the heavens, including the angels, the stars, and the sun and moon, down to the earth, the birds and insects, and the inhabitants of the ocean depths. Then it ascends again to man, and this all-encompassing view of God's creations gives him much to praise God for. Quoting Edinburgh minister John Pulsford, Charles Spurgeon notes that the last three psalms in the Book of Psalms (Psalms 148, 149, and 150) form "a triad of wondrous praise": "Heaven is full of praise, the earth is full of praise, praises rise from under the earth, 'everything that hath breath' joins in the rapture. God is encompassed by a loving, praising creation".

British evangelist G. Campbell Morgan also notes that this is a psalm of praise, writing: "What a wonderful song this is! Look over it again, and note the fact that there is no reference in it, from first to last, to the mercy, or pity, or compassion of God. But that is because there is no reference to evil in any form".

The Midrash Tehillim identifies the entities to which the opening verses are addressed. "Praise you the Lord from the heavens" (v. 1) is addressing the ministering angels; "praise Him all you hosts" (v. 2) is addressed to those who fulfill God's will. "Praise you Him, sun and moon" (v. 3) refers to the Jewish Patriarchs and Matriarchs who are likened to the sun and moon in Joseph's dream (Genesis 37:9). "Praise Him, all you stars of light" (v. 3) refers to righteous individuals, as Daniel said, "And they that turn the many to righteousness as the stars forever and ever" (Daniel 12:3). The Midrash adds, "From this you learn that every [righteous individual] has his own star in heaven, and that his star shines according to his deeds".

== Uses ==
=== Judaism ===
Alexander Kirkpatrick observes that this psalm was "obviously written for liturgical use". It is recited in its entirety during Pesukei Dezimra, the first section of the daily morning prayer service.

Verses 1–6 are recited at the opening to Kiddush Levanah in the Ashkenazi tradition, and during the same prayer in some Sephardic traditions. Verses 1–6 are also recited during Birkat Hachama, the blessing on the sun.

Verse 7 is the verse said by the sea monsters in the ancient text of Perek Shirah.

The first part of verse 13, beginning with the word "Yehallelu", is said by the Hazzan as he returns the Torah scroll to the ark during morning services; the congregation recites the last part of this verse and continues with the recital of verse 14. In the Italian rite, they begin with verse 12.

It is good to say this Psalm before reciting the Perek Shira

=== Catholic Church ===
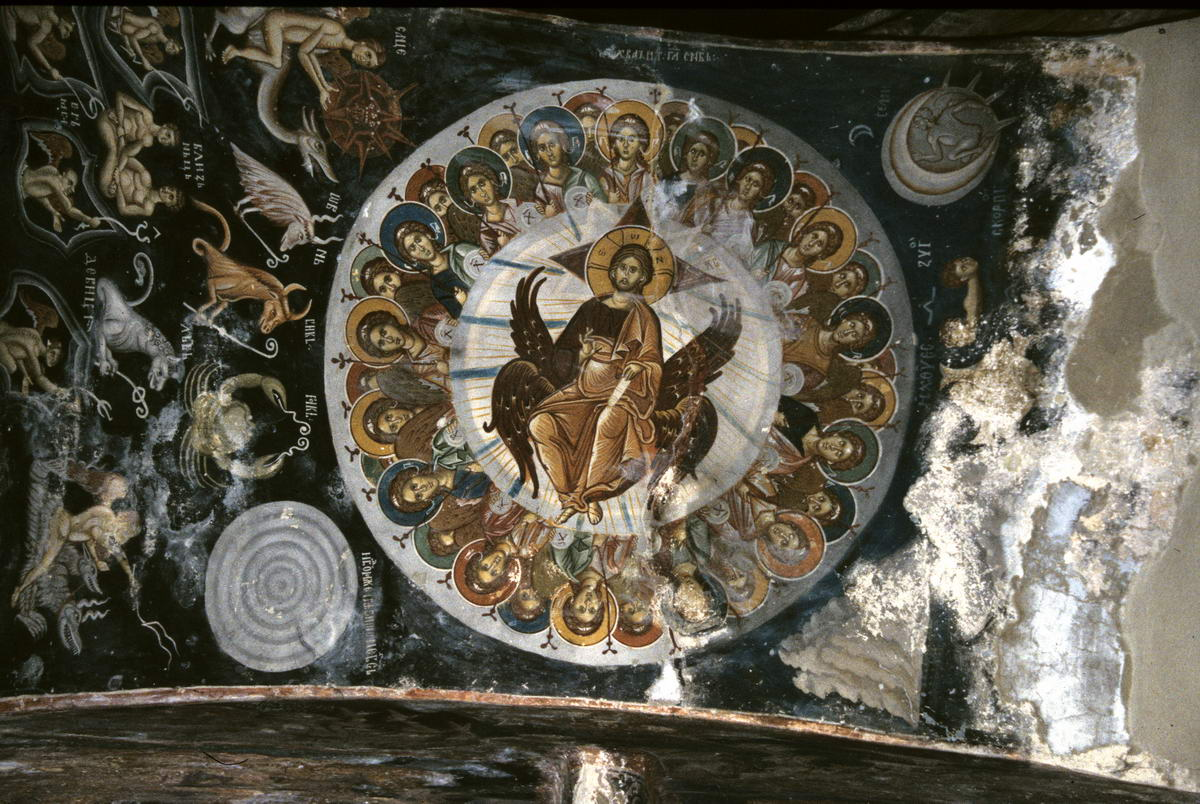
Illustration of Psalm 148 in Lesnovo monastery, 14th century

Psalm 148 is one of the Laudate psalms and was sung as one of a trio of psalms, Psalms 148, 149, and 150, during Lauds in the Roman rite. Around 530 A.D., St. Benedict of Nursia chose these three psalms for the office of morning celebrated daily. In the Liturgy of the Hours, Psalm 148 is recited during Sunday Lauds in the third week.

=== Book of Common Prayer ===
In the Church of England's Book of Common Prayer, this psalm is appointed to be read on the evening of the thirtieth day of the month.

=== Coptic Orthodox Church ===
Psalms 148, 149 and 150 together constitute the fourth Hoos (or fourth Canticle) of the Tasbeha, the Midnight Praise of the Coptic Orthodox Church.

=== Literature ===
John Milton paraphrased some of the praises in this psalm in his epic poem Paradise Lost, Book 5.

=== Architecture ===
Church buildings have been decorated with creatures mentioned in Psalm 148, including the Irish Honan Chapel which refers to it in inscription and mosaics, and St John the Evangelist's Church, Crawshawbooth, Scotland, with carvings. The Riverside Church in Manhattan features elements mentioned in Psalm 148 carved in oak on the ends of the choir stalls.

== Musical settings ==
"Erfreue dich, Himmel, erfreue dich, Erde" is a hymn in German, in which Maria Luise Thurmair paraphrased Psalm 148 in 1969, based on an older Christmas carol.

Heinrich Schütz composed a four-part setting of a metric German version for the Becker Psalter, "Lobet, ihr Himmel, Gott den Herrn (Praise, ye Heavens, God the Lord), SWV 253. Marc-Antoine Charpentier set in 1679-1680 one "Laudate Dominum de coelis", H.177, for three voices, two treble instruments, and continuo.

Darwall's 148th is John Darwell's musical setting for Psalm 148, composed for the inauguration of a new organ in Walsall parish church, then in Staffordshire, England.

The first six verses of Psalm 148 have been set to music as a Hebrew song. American composer Leonard Bernstein adapted the text for his Psalm 148, a setting for voice and piano and dated in 1935, his earliest surviving composition. Alan Hovhaness adapted the text in 1958 for his setting for chorus and organ, split as two separate pieces (opus 160 Praise Ye Him, All His Angels and 160a Let Them Praise the Name of the Lord) when published by C.F. Peters.

== Text ==
The following table shows the Hebrew text of the Psalm with vowels, alongside the Koine Greek text in the Septuagint and the English translation from the King James Version. Note that the meaning can slightly differ between these versions, as the Septuagint and the Masoretic Text come from different textual traditions. (Note: A 1917 translation directly from Hebrew to English by the Jewish Publication Society can be found here or here, and an 1844 translation directly from the Septuagint by L. C. L. Brenton can be found here. Both translations are in the public domain.) In the Septuagint, this psalm is numbered Psalm 147.

#	Hebrew	English	Greek
1	הַ֥לְלוּ־יָ֨הּ ׀ הַֽלְל֣וּ אֶת־יְ֭הֹוָה מִן־הַשָּׁמַ֑יִם הַֽ֝לְל֗וּהוּ בַּמְּרוֹמִֽים׃	Praise ye the LORD. Praise ye the LORD from the heavens: praise him in the heights.	᾿Αλληλούϊα· ᾿Αγγαίου καὶ Ζαχαρίου. – ΑΙΝΕΙΤΕ τὸν Κύριον ἐκ τῶν οὐρανῶν· αἰνεῖτε αὐτὸν ἐν τοῖς ὑψίστοις.
2	הַֽלְל֥וּהוּ כׇל־מַלְאָכָ֑יו הַ֝לְל֗וּהוּ כׇּל־צְבָאָֽו׃	Praise ye him, all his angels: praise ye him, all his hosts.	αἰνεῖτε αὐτόν, πάντες οἱ ἄγγελοι αὐτοῦ· αἰνεῖτε αὐτόν, πᾶσαι αἱ δυνάμεις αὐτοῦ.
3	הַֽ֭לְלוּהוּ שֶׁ֣מֶשׁ וְיָרֵ֑חַ הַֽ֝לְל֗וּהוּ כׇּל־כּ֥וֹכְבֵי אֽוֹר׃	Praise ye him, sun and moon: praise him, all ye stars of light.	αἰνεῖτε αὐτὸν ἥλιος καὶ σελήνη, αἰνεῖτε αὐτὸν πάντα τὰ ἄστρα καὶ τὸ φῶς.
4	הַֽ֭לְלוּהוּ שְׁמֵ֣י הַשָּׁמָ֑יִם וְ֝הַמַּ֗יִם אֲשֶׁ֤ר ׀ מֵעַ֬ל הַשָּׁמָֽיִם׃	Praise him, ye heavens of heavens, and ye waters that be above the heavens.	αἰνεῖτε αὐτὸν οἱ οὐρανοὶ τῶν οὐρανῶν καὶ τὸ ὕδωρ τὸ ὑπεράνω τῶν οὐρανῶν.
5	יְֽ֭הַלְלוּ אֶת־שֵׁ֣ם יְהֹוָ֑ה כִּ֤י ה֖וּא צִוָּ֣ה וְנִבְרָֽאוּ׃	Let them praise the name of the LORD: for he commanded, and they were created.	αἰνεσάτωσαν τὸ ὄνομα Κυρίου, ὅτι αὐτὸς εἶπε, καὶ ἐγενήθησαν, αὐτὸς ἐνετείλατο, καὶ ἐκτίσθησαν.
6	וַיַּעֲמִידֵ֣ם לָעַ֣ד לְעוֹלָ֑ם חׇק־נָ֝תַ֗ן וְלֹ֣א יַעֲבֽוֹר׃	He hath also stablished them for ever and ever: he hath made a decree which shall not pass.	ἔστησεν αὐτὰ εἰς τὸν αἰῶνα καὶ εἰς τὸν αἰῶνα τοῦ αἰῶνος· πρόσταγμα ἔθετο, καὶ οὐ παρελεύσεται.
7	הַֽלְל֣וּ אֶת־יְ֭הֹוָה מִן־הָאָ֑רֶץ תַּ֝נִּינִ֗ים וְכׇל־תְּהֹמֽוֹת׃	Praise the LORD from the earth, ye dragons, and all deeps:	αἰνεῖτε τὸν Κύριον ἐκ τῆς γῆς, δράκοντες καὶ πᾶσαι ἄβυσσοι·
8	אֵ֣שׁ וּ֭בָרָד שֶׁ֣לֶג וְקִיט֑וֹר ר֥וּחַ סְ֝עָרָ֗ה עֹשָׂ֥ה דְבָרֽוֹ׃	Fire, and hail; snow, and vapours; stormy wind fulfilling his word:	πῦρ, χάλαζα, χιών, κρύσταλλος, πνεῦμα καταιγίδος, τὰ ποιοῦντα τὸν λόγον αὐτοῦ·
9	הֶהָרִ֥ים וְכׇל־גְּבָע֑וֹת עֵ֥ץ פְּ֝רִ֗י וְכׇל־אֲרָזִֽים׃	Mountains, and all hills; fruitful trees, and all cedars:	τὰ ὄρη καὶ πάντες οἱ βουνοί, ξύλα καρποφόρα καὶ πᾶσαι κέδροι·
10	הַחַיָּ֥ה וְכׇל־בְּהֵמָ֑ה רֶ֝֗מֶשׂ וְצִפּ֥וֹר כָּנָֽף׃	Beasts, and all cattle; creeping things, and flying fowl:	τὰ θηρία καὶ πάντα τὰ κτήνη, ἑρπετὰ καὶ πετεινὰ πτερωτά·
11	מַלְכֵי־אֶ֭רֶץ וְכׇל־לְאֻמִּ֑ים שָׂ֝רִ֗ים וְכׇל־שֹׁ֥פְטֵי אָֽרֶץ׃	Kings of the earth, and all people; princes, and all judges of the earth:	βασιλεῖς τῆς γῆς καὶ πάντες λαοί, ἄρχοντες καὶ πάντες κριταὶ γῆς·
12	בַּחוּרִ֥ים וְגַם־בְּתוּל֑וֹת זְ֝קֵנִ֗ים עִם־נְעָרִֽים׃	Both young men, and maidens; old men, and children:	νεανίσκοι καὶ παρθένοι, πρεσβύτεροι μετὰ νεωτέρων·
13	יְהַלְל֤וּ ׀ אֶת־שֵׁ֬ם יְהֹוָ֗ה כִּֽי־נִשְׂגָּ֣ב שְׁמ֣וֹ לְבַדּ֑וֹ ה֝וֹד֗וֹ עַל־אֶ֥רֶץ וְשָׁמָֽיִם׃	Let them praise the name of the LORD: for his name alone is excellent; his glory is above the earth and heaven.	αἰνεσάτωσαν τὸ ὄνομα Κυρίου, ὅτι ὑψώθη τὸ ὄνομα αὐτοῦ μόνου· ἡ ἐξομολόγησις αὐτοῦ ἐπὶ γῆς καὶ οὐρανοῦ.
14	וַיָּ֤רֶם קֶ֨רֶן ׀ לְעַמּ֡וֹ תְּהִלָּ֤ה לְֽכׇל־חֲסִידָ֗יו לִבְנֵ֣י יִ֭שְׂרָאֵל עַ֥ם קְרֹב֗וֹ הַֽלְלוּ־יָֽהּ׃	He also exalteth the horn of his people, the praise of all his saints; even of the children of Israel, a people near unto him. Praise ye the LORD.	καὶ ὑψώσει κέρας λαοῦ αὐτοῦ· ὕμνος πᾶσι τοῖς ὁσίοις αὐτοῦ, τοῖς υἱοῖς ᾿Ισραήλ, λαῷ ἐγγίζοντι αὐτῷ.

=== Verse 14 ===
He has exalted the horn of His people,
The praise of all His saints—
Of the children of Israel,
A people near to Him.
Praise the Lord!

Matthew Poole notes that in scripture, the "horn" generally denotes "strength, victory, glory, and felicity".

== Sources ==
- Nulman, Macy (1996). The Encyclopedia of Jewish Prayer: The Ashkenazic and Sephardic Rites. Jason Aronson. ISBN 1-4616-3124-6.
- Scherman, Rabbi Nosson (2003). The Complete Artscroll Siddur (3rd ed.). Mesorah Publications, Ltd. ISBN 978-0-89906-650-9.
