= Psalm 149 =

Psalm

- "Sing a new song unto the Lord"
- Hymn psalm
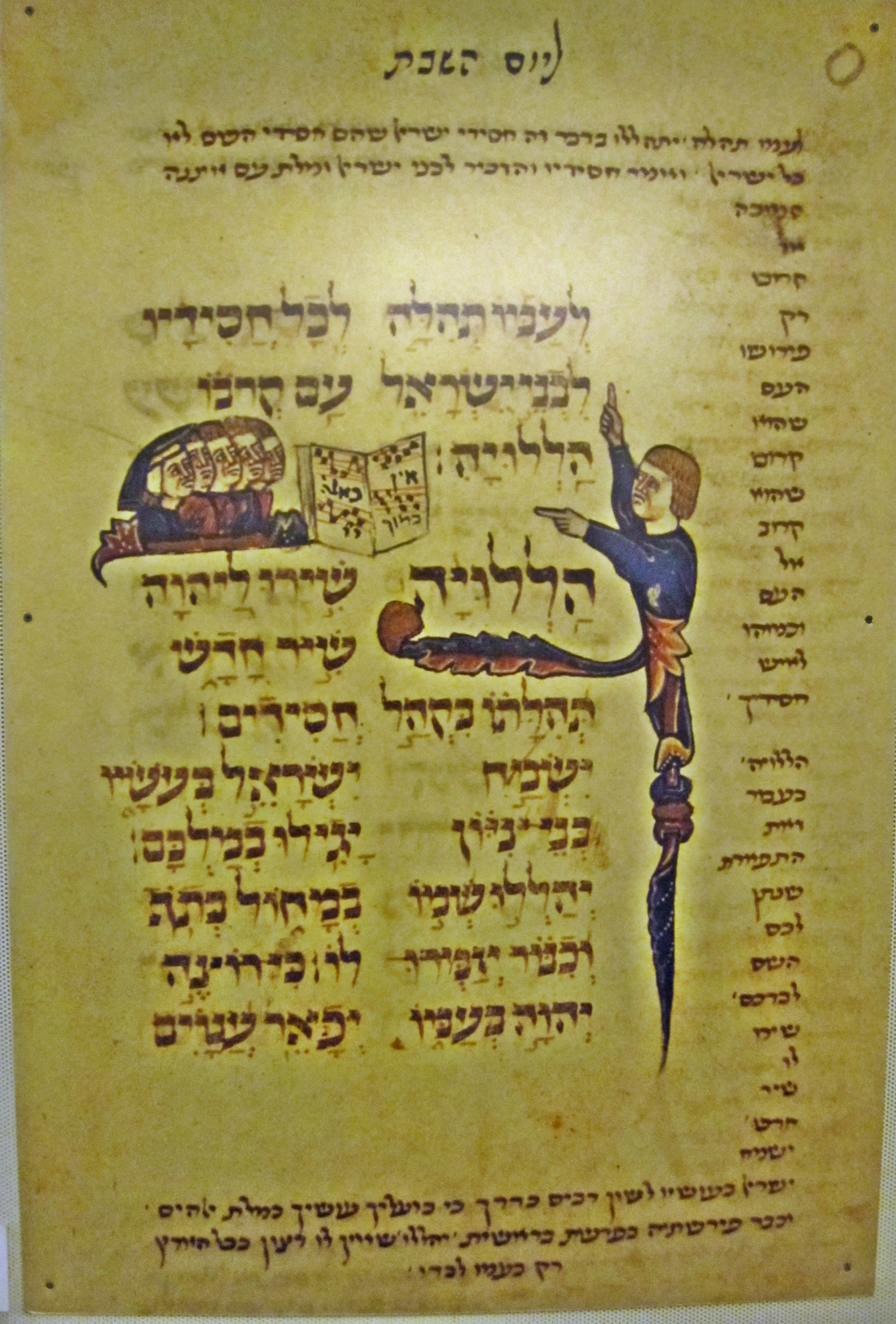
- Psalm 149 in Hebrew on a French parchment from the 13th century
- Other name: "Cantate Domino"
- Related: Psalm 96; Psalm 98
- Language: Hebrew (original)

Psalm 149
- ← Psalm 148 Psalm 150 →
- Book: Book of Psalms
- Hebrew Bible part: Ketuvim
- Order in the Hebrew part: 1
- Category: Sifrei Emet
- Christian Bible part: Old Testament
- Order in the Christian part: 19

Psalm 149 is the 149th psalm of the Book of Psalms, a hymn as the book's penultimate piece. The first verse of the psalm calls to praise in singing, in English in the King James Version: "Sing a new song unto the Lord". Similar to Psalm 96 and Psalm 98 (Cantate Domino), Psalm 149 calls to praise God in music and dance, because he has chosen his people and helped them to victory. Psalm 149 is also marked by its martial tone: it calls on the people to be ready to fight.

The psalm forms a regular part of Jewish, Catholic, Lutheran and Anglican liturgies. It has often been set to music, notably by Antonín Dvořák who set the complete psalm for chorus and orchestra, while Bach chose only the first three verses for his motet Singet dem Herrn ein neues Lied, BWV 225. It was paraphrased in hymns.

== Background and themes ==
Psalm 149 shares its first line with Psalm 98, known as Cantate Domino. Both psalms call for praise of God in music and dance, because God has chosen his people and helped them to victory. Psalm 149 also calls to be ready to fight, with "swords sharpened on both sides in their hands". The end of the psalm has been interpreted differently by commentators. Augustine of Hippo wrote that the phrase of the sword has a "mystical meaning", dividing temporal and eternal things. James L. Mays comments: "There is an eschatological, almost apocalyptic, dimension to the psalm's anticipation of a warfare of the faithful that will settle the conflict of the kingdoms of this world and the kingdom of God".

Citing verses 5 and 6, the Talmud (Berakhot 5) says the praises said by the pious on their beds refer to the recital of the Bedtime Shema. The Shema is like a "double-edged sword" that can destroy both inner and outer demons and evil spirits. This image of a double-edged sword also refers to Israel's power of praises of God, which enable them to avenge themselves against the nations that persecuted them when the nations receive their punishment at the end of days.

C. S. Rodd notes that some writers divide the psalm into two sections, verses 1-4 and 5-9 (such as the layout in the New King James Version), but others create three sections, verses 1-3, 4-6, and 7-9. Support for a three-section structure "is seen primarily in the triad of infinitives in verses 7-9", namely to execute vengeance ..., to bind their kings ..., to execute judgment ... in the King James Version.

== Uses ==
=== Judaism ===
Psalm 149 is recited in its entirety in the Pesukei D'Zimra ("Verses of Praise") section of the daily morning prayer. It is traditionally grouped with Psalms 146, 147, 148, and 150 – the five concluding chapters of the Book of Psalms, which are all recited in their entirety during Pesukei D'Zimra – under the classification of "halleluyah" psalms which express praise of God.

Verse 2 is recited by the creeping creatures in Perek Shira.

Verse 5 is recited after saying Mishnayos for the departed.

=== Catholic Church ===
The psalm is one of the Laudate psalms or hymn psalms. With Psalm 148 and Psalm 150, Psalm 149 was recited or sung daily during the solemn service of matins, according to the Rule of St. Benedict (530AD).

In the Liturgy of the Hours, Psalm 149 is used for Sunday Lauds of the Roman rite in the first week. It is also used on solemn feasts, because they always use the Psalms for the first Sunday. In the Eucharistic liturgy, it is the Saturday after the Epiphany or before January 7 epiphany, and at Easter, the Monday of the sixth week.

=== Book of Common Prayer ===
In the Church of England's Book of Common Prayer, this psalm is appointed to be read on the evening of the thirtieth day of the month.

=== Coptic Orthodox Church ===
Psalms 148, 149 and 150 together constitute the fourth Hoos (or fourth Canticle) of the Tasbeha, the Midnight Praise of the Coptic Orthodox Church.

== Musical settings ==
With an incipit about singing, the psalm and especially its first line has often been set to music in various languages. Heinrich Schütz published a composition of its beginning in Latin, "Cantate Domino canticum novum" in 1625 in his Cantiones sacrae as SWV 81, scored for four voices and basso continuo. He set the psalm in German, titled Die heilige Gemeine (The holy congregation) as part of the Becker Psalter, as SWV 254. Matthäus Apelles von Löwenstern published the hymn "Singt dem Herrn ein neues Lied", a paraphrase of the psalm, in 1644. BWV 411 is Johann Sebastian Bach's four-part setting of Löwenstern's hymn tune. Bach's cantata Singet dem Herrn ein neues Lied, BWV 190, for New Year's Day, and his motet Singet dem Herrn ein neues Lied, BWV 225, composed in the 1720s like the cantata, both open with words taken from the beginning of the psalm. Jean-Joseph de Mondonville set the psalm as a motet, one of his nine grand motets, in 1734.

Antonín Dvořák set the complete psalm for mixed choir and orchestra, as his Op. 79. Bernard Rose set the psalm in English as Praise ye the Lord for unaccompanied double choir in 1949. Philip James set it for choir in 1956. Raymond Wilding-White set the psalm for two sopranos, violin and viola. David Conte set the first two verses in Latin for antiphonal double chorus.

English-language hymns paraphrasing Psalm 149, or taking inspiration from it, include "I sing the mighty power of God", "Let all the world in every corner sing", "Lord of the Dance", "Praise the Lord, sing Hallelujah", "Songs of praise the angels sang", and "We sing the mighty power of God".

== Text ==
The following table shows the Hebrew text of the Psalm with vowels, alongside the Koine Greek text in the Septuagint and the English translation from the King James Version. Note that the meaning can slightly differ between these versions, as the Septuagint and the Masoretic Text come from different textual traditions. (Note: A 1917 translation directly from Hebrew to English by the Jewish Publication Society can be found here or here, and an 1844 translation directly from the Septuagint by L. C. L. Brenton can be found here. Both translations are in the public domain.) In the Septuagint, this psalm is numbered Psalm 148.

#	Hebrew	English	Greek
1	הַ֥לְלוּ־יָ֨הּ ׀ שִׁ֣ירוּ לַֽ֭יהֹוָה שִׁ֣יר חָדָ֑שׁ תְּ֝הִלָּת֗וֹ בִּקְהַ֥ל חֲסִידִֽים׃	Praise ye the LORD. Sing unto the Lord a new song, and his praise in the congregation of saints.	᾿Αλληλούϊα. – ΑΣΑΤΕ τῷ Κυρίῳ ᾆσμα καινόν, ἡ αἴνεσις αὐτοῦ ἐν ἐκκλησίᾳ ὁσίων.
2	יִשְׂמַ֣ח יִשְׂרָאֵ֣ל בְּעֹשָׂ֑יו בְּנֵֽי־צִ֝יּ֗וֹן יָגִ֥ילוּ בְמַלְכָּֽם׃	Let Israel rejoice in him that made him: let the children of Zion be joyful in their King.	εὐφρανθήτω ᾿Ισραὴλ ἐπὶ τῷ ποιήσαντι αὐτόν, καὶ οἱ υἱοὶ Σιὼν ἀγαλλιάσθωσαν ἐπὶ τῷ βασιλεῖ αὐτῶν.
3	יְהַלְל֣וּ שְׁמ֣וֹ בְמָח֑וֹל בְּתֹ֥ף וְ֝כִנּ֗וֹר יְזַמְּרוּ־לֽוֹ׃	Let them praise his name in the dance: let them sing praises unto him with the timbrel and harp.	αἰνεσάτωσαν τὸ ὄνομα αὐτοῦ ἐν χορῷ, ἐν τυμπάνῳ καὶ ψαλτηρίῳ ψαλάτωσαν αὐτῷ,
4	כִּֽי־רוֹצֶ֣ה יְהֹוָ֣ה בְּעַמּ֑וֹ יְפָאֵ֥ר עֲ֝נָוִ֗ים בִּישׁוּעָֽה׃	For the Lord taketh pleasure in his people: he will beautify the meek with salvation.	ὅτι εὐδοκεῖ Κύριος ἐν τῷ λαῷ αὐτοῦ καὶ ὑψώσει πραεῖς ἐν σωτηρίᾳ.
5	יַעְלְז֣וּ חֲסִידִ֣ים בְּכָב֑וֹד יְ֝רַנְּנ֗וּ עַל־מִשְׁכְּבוֹתָֽם׃	Let the saints be joyful in glory: let them sing aloud upon their beds.	καυχήσονται ὅσιοι ἐν δόξῃ καὶ ἀγαλλιάσονται ἐπὶ τῶν κοιτῶν αὐτῶν.
6	רוֹמְמ֣וֹת אֵ֭ל בִּגְרוֹנָ֑ם וְחֶ֖רֶב פִּיפִיּ֣וֹת בְּיָדָֽם׃	Let the high praises of God be in their mouth, and a two-edged sword in their hand;	αἱ ὑψώσεις τοῦ Θεοῦ ἐν τῷ λάρυγγι αὐτῶν, καὶ ῥομφαῖαι δίστομοι ἐν ταῖς χερσὶν αὐτῶν
7	לַעֲשׂ֣וֹת נְ֭קָמָה בַּגּוֹיִ֑ם תּ֝וֹכֵח֗וֹת בַּלְאֻמִּֽים׃	To execute vengeance upon the heathen, and punishments upon the people;	τοῦ ποιῆσαι ἐκδίκησιν ἐν τοῖς ἔθνεσιν, ἐλεγμοὺς ἐν τοῖς λαοῖς,
8	לֶאְסֹ֣ר מַלְכֵיהֶ֣ם בְּזִקִּ֑ים וְ֝נִכְבְּדֵיהֶ֗ם בְּכַבְלֵ֥י בַרְזֶֽל׃	To bind their kings with chains, and their nobles with fetters of iron;	τοῦ δῆσαι τοὺς βασιλεῖς αὐτῶν ἐν πέδαις καὶ τοὺς ἐνδόξους αὐτῶν ἐν χειροπέδαις σιδηραῖς,
9	לַעֲשׂ֤וֹת בָּהֶ֨ם ׀ מִשְׁפָּ֬ט כָּת֗וּב הָדָ֣ר ה֭וּא לְכׇל־חֲסִידָ֗יו הַֽלְלוּ־יָֽהּ׃	To execute upon them the judgment written: this honour have all his saints. Praise ye the Lord.	τοῦ ποιῆσαι ἐν αὐτοῖς κρῖμα ἔγγραπτον· δόξα αὕτη ἔσται πᾶσι τοῖς ὁσίοις αὐτοῦ.
