= St John Passion discography =

Recordings of the St John Passion are shown as a sortable table of selected notable recordings of Johann Sebastian Bach's St John Passion, BWV 245. The selection is taken from the 241 recordings listed on bach-cantatas as of 2015.

== History ==
The work was first recorded by symphonic choirs and orchestras. From the late 1960s, historically informed performances (HIP) tried to adhere more to the sounds of the composer's lifetime, who typically wrote for boys choirs and for comparatively small orchestras of Baroque instruments, often now called "period instruments". Some scholars believe that Bach used only one singer for a vocal part in the choral movements, termed "one voice per part" (OVPP). On some of these recordings, the solo singer is reinforced in choral movements with a larger orchestra by a ripieno singer (OVPP+R).

== Table of selected recordings ==
The sortable listing is taken mostly from the selection provided by Aryeh Oron on the Bach-Cantatas website.

The information lists for one recording typically:

- Conductor / choir / orchestra, sometimes several choirs
- Soloists in the order Evangelist (tenor), Vox Christi (Voice of Jesus, bass), soprano, alto, tenor (if the tenor arias are performed by a different tenor than the evangelist), bass (if the bass parts are performed by a different bass than the voice of Jesus).
- Label
- Year of the recording
- Choir type
  1. Large choirs (red background): Bach (choir dedicated to Bach's music, founded in the mid of the 20th century), Boys (choir of all male voices), Radio (choir of a broadcaster), Symphony (choir related to a symphony orchestra)
  2. Medium-size choirs, such as Chamber choir, Chorale (choir dedicated mostly to church music)
  3. One voice per part (green background): OVPP or OVPP+R (with ripienists reinforcing the soloists in some chorale movements)
- Orch. type (orchestra type)
  1. Large orchestras (red background): Bach (orchestra dedicated to Bach's music, founded in the mid of the 20th century), Radio (symphony orchestra of a broadcaster), Symphony
  2. Chamber orchestra
  3. Orchestra on period instruments (green background)

Recordings of Bach's St John Passion, BWV 245
Conductor / Choir / Orchestra	Soloists	Label	Year	Choir type	Orch. type	
Günther Ramin Thomanerchor Gewandhausorchester	Ernst Haefliger; Franz Kelch; Agnes Giebel; Marga Höffgen; Hans-Olaf Hudemann	Berlin Classics	1954	Boys	Symphony	
Fritz Lehmann Wiener Singakademie Wiener Symphoniker	Julius Patzak; Gérard Souzay; Uta Graf; Marga Höffgen; Walter Berry	M+A	1955	Chamber	Symphony	
Eugen Jochum Bavarian Radio Choir Bavarian Radio Symphony Orchestra	John van Kesteren; Hans Hotter; Elisabeth Grümmer; Marga Höffgen; Peter Pears; Kieth Engen	Golden Melodram	1960	Radio	Radio	
David Willcocks King's College Choir Cambridge Philomusica of London	Peter Pears; David Ward; Elizabeth Harwood; Helen Watts; Alexander Young; Harvey Alan	Decca Records	1960			Sung in English
Fritz Werner Heinrich-Schütz-Chor Heilbronn Pforzheim Chamber Orchestra	Helmut Krebs; Franz Kelch; Friederike Sailer; Marga Höffgen; Hermann Werdermann	Erato	1960		Chamber	
Karl Richter Münchener Bach-Chor Münchener Bach-Orchester	Ernst Haefliger; Hermann Prey; Evelyn Lear; Hertha Töpper; Kieth Engen	Archiv Produktion	1965	Bach	Bach	
Nikolaus Harnoncourt: Wiener Sängerknaben; Chorus Viennensis; Concentus Musicus Wien	Kurt Equiluz; Max van Egmond; boy soprano and alto soloists of the Wiener Sängerknaben; Bert van t'Hoff; Jacques Villisech	Teldec	1965	Boys	Period	
Karl Richter Münchener Bach-Chor Münchener Bach-Orchester	Ernst Haefliger; Peter van der Bilt; Ursula Buckel; Hertha Töpper	Melodiya / Ars Nova	1968	Bach	Bach	
Karl Münchinger Stuttgarter Hymnus-Chorknaben Stuttgarter Kammerorchester	Dieter Ellenbeck; Walter Berry; Elly Ameling; Julia Hamari; Werner Hollweg; Hermann Prey	Decca	1974	Boys	Chamber	
Johan van der Meer Groningse Bachvereniging Barockinstrumentalisten	Marius van Altena; Max van Egmond; Marjanne Kweksilber; Charles Brett; Harry Geraerts; Harry van der Kamp	Groningse Bachvereniging	1979	Bach	Period	
Helmuth Rilling Gächinger Kantorei Bach-Collegium Stuttgart	Peter Schreier; Philippe Huttenlocher; Arleen Augér; Julia Hamari; Dietrich Fischer-Dieskau	Sony Classical	1984	Chorale	Chamber	
Sigiswald Kuijken La Petite Bande	Christoph Prégardien; Harry van der Kamp; Barbara Schlick; René Jacobs; Nico van der Meel; Max van Egmond	Deutsche Harmonia Mundi	1987		Period	
Philippe Herreweghe Collegium Vocale Gent Orchestre de La Chapelle Royale	Howard Crook; Peter Lika; Barbara Schlick; Catherine Patriasz; William Kendall; Peter Kooy	Harmonia Mundi	1987		Period	
Karl-Friedrich Beringer Windsbacher Knabenchor Münchener Kammerorchester	Markus Schäfer; Hans Griepentrog; Christiane Oelze, Monica Groop; Michael Volle	Sony Classical	1984	Boys	Chamber	
John Eliot Gardiner Monteverdi Choir English Baroque Soloists	Anthony Rolfe Johnson; Stephen Varcoe; Nancy Argenta; Ruth Holton; Michael Chance; Rufus Müller; Cornelius Hauptmann	Archiv	1986		Period	
Andrew Parrott Taverner Consort and Players	Tessa Bonner; David Thomas; Rogers Covey-Crump; Christian Fliegner; Simon Grant	EMI	1990	OVPP	Period	
Ton Koopman De Nederlandse Bachvereniging Amsterdam Baroque Orchestra	Guy de Mey; Peter Kooy; Barbara Schlick; Kai Wessel; Gerd Türk; Klaus Mertens	Erato	1993		Period	
Philippe Herreweghe Collegium Vocale Gent Collegium Vocale Gent	Ian Bostridge; Franz-Josef Selig; Sibylla Rubens; Andreas Scholl; Werner Güra; Dietrich Henschel	Harmonia Mundi	1998		Period	
Masaaki Suzuki Bach Collegium Japan Bach Collegium Japan	Gerd Türk; Peter Kooy; Ingrid Schmithüsen, Yoshikazu Mera	BIS	1998		Period	
Joshard Daus Bach Ensemble of EuropaChorAkademie	Lothar Odinius; Peter Lika; Hellen Kwon; Ursula Eittinger; Wolfgang Newerla	Arte Nova	1999			
Simon Rattle RIAS Kammerchor Berlin Philharmonic	Ian Bostridge; Thomas Quasthoff; Juliane Banse; Michael Chance; Rainer Trost	Encore	2002	Chamber	Symphony	
Jos van Veldhoven De Nederlandse Bachvereniging De Nederlandse Bachvereniging	Gerd Türk; Stephan MacLeod; Caroline Stam; Peter de Groot; Charles Daniels; Bas Ramselaar	Channel Classics	2004		Period	
Georg Christoph Biller Thomanerchor Gewandhausorchester	Marcus Ullmann; Gotthold Schwarz; Ruth Holton; Matthias Rexroth; Henryk Böhm	Rondeau Production ROP 4024/25	2007	Boys	Symphony	
Greg Funfgeld The Bach Choir of Bethlehem The Bach Festival Orchestra	Charles Daniels; William Sharp; Julia Doyle; Daniel Taylor; Benjamin Butterfield; Christòpheren Nomura; David Newman	ANALEKTA AN 2 9890-1	2012	SATB	Symphony	
John Butt Dunedin Consort	Nicholas Mulroy; Matthew Brook; Joanne Lunn; Claire Wilkinson	Linn Records	2013	OVPP+R	Period	
Richard Egarr Academy of Ancient Music	James Gilchrist; Matthew Rose; Ashley Riches; Elizabeth Watts; Sarah Connolly; Andrew Kennedy; Christopher Purves	AAM Records	2014	OVPP	Period	
Stephen Cleobury The Choir of King's College, Cambridge Academy of Ancient Music	James Gilchrist; Neal Davies; Sophie Bevan; Iestyn Davies; Ed Lyon; Roderick Williams; Benedict Kearns; Toby Ward	King's College	2017		Period	

== Sources ==
- St. John Passion Commentary, musical examples, list of recordings, and other information on bach-cantatas
