= Ach Herr, mich armen Sünder, BWV 135 =

Chorale cantata by Johann Sebastian Bach

Ach Herr, mich armen Sünder
- BWV 135
- Chorale cantata by J. S. Bach
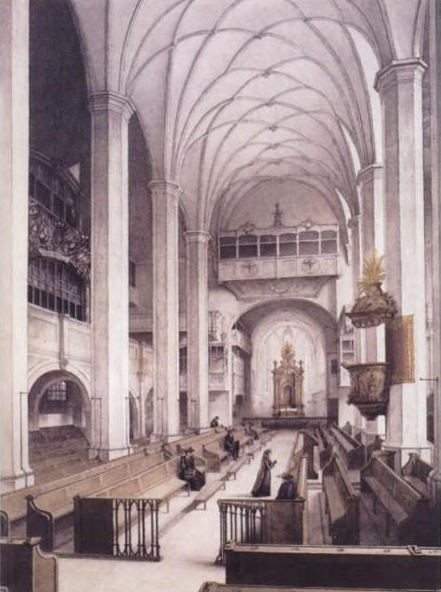
- Thomaskirche, Leipzig
- Occasion: Third Sunday after Trinity
- Chorale: "Ach Herr, mich armen Sünder" by Cyriakus Schneegass
- Performed: 25 June 1724: Leipzig
- Movements: 6
- Vocal: SATB choir; solo: alto, tenor and bass
- Instrumental: cornett; trombone; 2 oboes; 2 violins; viola; continuo

Johann Sebastian Bach composed the church cantata Ach Herr, mich armen Sünder (Ah Lord, poor sinner that I am), BWV 135 in Leipzig for the third Sunday after Trinity and first performed it on 25 June 1724. It is the fourth chorale cantata from his second annual cycle, and is based on the hymn by Cyriakus Schneegass.

In the format of Bach's chorale cantata cycle, the words of the hymn are retained unchanged only in the outer movements, while an unknown contemporary librettist paraphrased the inner stanzas for recitatives and arias. Bach structured the cantata in six movements, setting the chorale tune in a chorale fantasia in the opening movement, and in a four-part setting in the closing movement. The two choral movements frame alternating recitatives and arias of three vocal soloists. Bach also used a four-part choir, and a Baroque instrumental ensemble of cornett, trombone, two oboes, strings and continuo. He set the first movement as a polyphonic chorale fantasia, the bass sings the cantus firmus.

== History and words ==
Bach took office as Thomaskantor, music director in Leipzig, end of May 1723. It was part of his duties to supply music for the Sundays and feast days of the liturgical year at four churches of the town, and he decided to compose new cantatas for these occasions. He began with a cantata for the first Sunday after Trinity in 1723, performed on 30 May, and wrote a series of church cantatas until Trinity of the next year, which became known as his first cantata cycle. The following year, he composed new cantatas for the occasions of the liturgical year, each based on one Lutheran chorale, an effort which became known later as his chorale cantata cycle. He wrote Ach Herr, mich armen Sünder as the fourth cantata of this cycle, which he began two weeks earlier with O Ewigkeit, du Donnerwort, BWV 20.

Bach composed the cantata for the Third Sunday after Trinity as the fourth cantata of his second annual cycle, and first performed it on 25 June 1724, one day after Christ unser Herr zum Jordan kam, BWV 7, on St. John's Day.

The prescribed readings for the Sunday were from the First Epistle of Peter, "Cast thy burden upon the Lord" (1 Peter 5:6–11), and from the Gospel of Luke, the parable of the Lost Sheep and the parable of the Lost Coin (Luke 15:1–10). The cantata is based entirely on the chorale "Ach Herr, mich armen Sünder" (1597) by Cyriakus Schneegass, a paraphrase on Psalm 6 in six stanzas. The connection to the readings is rather marginal: the Lord's comforting (movement 3) and destruction of the enemies (movement 5) refer to the epistle, while the theme of the hymn, the joy about a repenting sinner, connects to the gospel. The unknown librettist retained the first and last stanza unchanged. He paraphrased the other four stanzas to four movements, for alternating recitatives and arias.

== Music ==
=== Structure and scoring ===
Bach structured the cantata in six movements. The first and last are set for choir as a chorale fantasia and a closing chorale. They frame alternating recitatives and arias with the text arranged by the librettist. Bach scored the work for three vocal soloists (alto (A), tenor (T) and bass (B)), a four-part choir, and a Baroque instrumental ensemble: cornett (Ct) to reinforce the soprano chorale tune in the last movement, trombone (Tb) to reinforce the bass chorale tune in the first movement, two oboes (Ob), two violins (Vl), viola (Va), and basso continuo (Bc). The duration of the cantata has been stated as 17 minutes.

In the following table of the movements, the scoring follows the Neue Bach-Ausgabe. The keys and time signatures are taken from the book by Bach scholar Alfred Dürr, using the symbols for common time (4/4) and alla breve (2/2). The instruments are shown separately for winds and strings, while the continuo, playing throughout, is not shown.

Movements of Ach Herr, mich armen Sünder
No.	Title	Text	Type	Vocal	Winds	Strings	Key	Time
1	Ach Herr, mich armen Sünder	Schneegass	Chorale fantasia	SATB	Tb 2Ob	2Vl Va	A minor	3/4
2	Ach heile mich, du Arzt der Seelen	anon.	Recitative	T				common time
3	Tröste mir, Jesu, meine Gemüte	anon.	Aria	T	2Ob		C major	3/4
4	Ich bin von Seufzen müde	anon.	Recitative	A				common time
5	Weicht, all ihr Übeltäter	anon.	Aria	B		2Vl Va	A minor	cut time
6	Ehr sei ins Himmels Throne	Schneegass	Chorale	SATB	Ct 2Ob	2Vl Va	E minor	common time

=== Structure ===
The opening chorus is a chorale fantasia as in the previous chorale cantatas. Bach had started the first one of his second cycle with the cantus firmus of the chorale tune in the soprano, in this fourth work the bass has the honour. According to the Bach scholar Christoph Wolff, the first four cantatas of the cycle form a group, distinctively different in their chorale fantasias. After a French Overture (O Ewigkeit, du Donnerwort, BWV 20), a motet (Ach Gott, vom Himmel sieh darein, BWV 2) and an Italian concerto (Christ unser Herr zum Jordan kam, BWV 7), the movement is an "extraordinary filigree of vocal and instrumental counterpoint" of the chorale melody. All parts, even the instruments, take part in the polyphonic setting of the tune. Bach used the melody, originally a love song, later for the first chorale of his Christmas Oratorio, "Wie soll ich dich empfangen", and several times in his St Matthew Passion, most prominently "O Haupt voll Blut und Wunden". All eight lines of the text are first treated instrumentally, then vocally. The instrumental anticipation is a trio without continuo of oboe I and II against the strings, which play in unison the cantus firmus. In stark contrast to this high texture, the four-part vocal setting is dominated by the cantus firmus in the bass, reinforced by the trombone and the continuo. The strings play colla parte with the other voices. On the words "daß ich mag ewig leben" (that I may live forever) the cantus firmus is broadened to three times as slow.

In the tenor recitative, "rushes of notes" illustrate the images of the repentant sinner's "tears, which, like rapid rivers, roll down my cheeks. My soul is anxious and fearful with terror". It is concluded by an original line from the chorale, "Ah, Lord, why so long?". In the tenor aria, accompanied by the two oboes, the "collapse in death" is pictured by falling sevenths, "silent in death" by long silences. The alto recitative opens with an original line of the chorale, "I am weary of sobbing", expressed in a variation of the first line of the tune. The bass aria is a vigorous call, "Hence, all you evildoers". The strings play a forceful two-bar phrase, repeated twice at lower pitches, at which point it soars upwards and becomes increasingly dispersive in nature. In Bach's Obituary, written by Carl Philipp Emanuel Bach and Agricola and published in 1754 mention is made of his distinctive melodies which are described as "strange" and "like no others". This is a good example; scrupulously shaped and crafted, ranging over nearly three octaves and carried forward through jagged shapes whilst radiating an unprecedented vigour and all the time reflecting the imagery of the text. The cantata closes with a four-part chorale, the soprano reinforced by the cornett.

== Recordings ==
Recordings of Bach's cantatas began in the first half of the 20th century. Series of recordings, often for broadcasting, were made from 1950. Nikolaus Harnoncourt and Gustav Leonhardt were the first to begin recording the complete cantatas in a 20-year collaboration using period instruments, boys' choirs and boy soloists. Helmuth Rilling completed a recording of the sacred cantatas and oratorios on Bach's 300th birthday, 21 March 1985. Other projects to record all sacred cantatas in historically informed performance were completed by Ton Koopman, John Eliot Gardiner, Pieter Jan Leusink and Masaaki Suzuki. Sigiswald Kuijken began to record a cycle of cantatas for the Complete Liturgical Year with an OVPP choir and historic instruments, the ensemble La Petite Bande.

In the following table, green background indicates an ensemble playing period instruments in historically informed performance. The year is of the recording, then of a release if different. The listing is taken from the selection on the Bach-Cantatas website.

Recordings of Ach Herr, mich armen Sünder
Title	Conductor / Choir / Orchestra	Soloists	Label	Year	Orch. type
J. S. Bach: Cantatas BWV 29 & BWV 135	Wolfgang Gönnenwein Süddeutscher Madrigalchor Deutsche Bachsolisten	Emmy Lisken; Petre Munteanu; Johannes Hoefflin; Jakob Stämpfli	Cantate	1963	
Bach Cantatas Vol. 3 – Ascension Day, Whitsun, Trinity	Karl Richter Münchener Bach-Chor Münchener Bach-Orchester	Anna Reynolds; Peter Schreier; Dietrich Fischer-Dieskau	Archiv Produktion	1975	
Die Bach Kantate Vol. 48	Helmuth Rilling Gächinger Kantorei Bach-Collegium Stuttgart	Helen Watts; Adalbert Kraus; Philippe Huttenlocher	Hänssler	1979	
J. S. Bach: Das Kantatenwerk – Sacred Cantatas Vol. 7	Gustav Leonhardt: Knabenchor Hannover; Collegium Vocale Gent; Leonhardt-Consort	René Jacobs; Marius van Altena; Max van Egmond	Teldec	1983	Period
Bach Edition Vol. 2 – Cantatas Vol. 11	Pieter Jan Leusink Holland Boys Choir Netherlands Bach Collegium	Sytse Buwalda; Knut Schoch; Bas Ramselaar	Brilliant Classics	1999	Period
J. S. Bach: Complete Cantatas Vol. 12	Ton Koopman Amsterdam Baroque Orchestra & Choir	Annette Markert; Christoph Prégardien; Klaus Mertens	Antoine Marchand	2000	Period
Bach Cantatas Vol. 2: Paris/Zürich	John Eliot Gardiner Monteverdi Choir English Baroque Soloists	Robin Tyson; Vernon Kirk; Jonathan Brown	Soli Deo Gloria	2000	Period
J.S. Bach: Cantatas Vol. 29 – Cantatas from Leipzig 1724	Masaaki Suzuki Bach Collegium Japan	Pascal Bertin; Gerd Türk; Peter Kooy	BIS	2004	Period
J. S. Bach: Cantatas for the Complete Liturgical Year Vol. 2: "Wer nur den lieben Gott lässt walten" – Cantatas BWV 177 · 93 · 135	Sigiswald Kuijken La Petite Bande	Siri Thornhill; Petra Noskaiová; Christoph Genz; Jan van der Crabben	Accent	2005	Period
