= Marius van Altena =

Dutch tenor (born 1938)

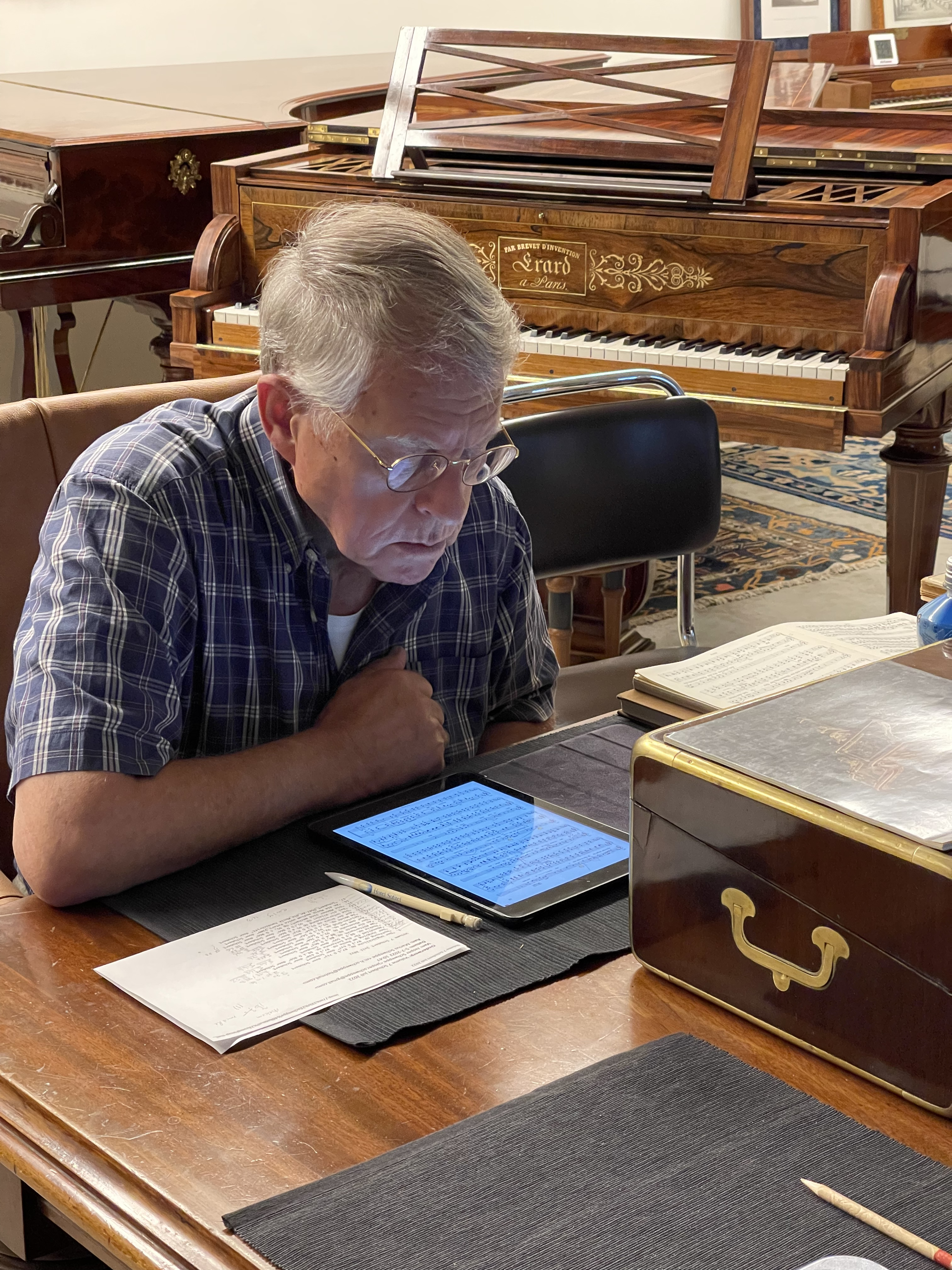
- Marius van Altena in 2022
- Born: Marius Hendrikus Schweppe; 10 October 1938 (age 87); Amsterdam
- Education: Conservatorium van Amsterdam
- Occupations: Classical tenor; Conductor; Academic teacher
- Organizations: Groningse Bachvereniging; Royal Conservatory of The Hague

Marius van Altena, born Marius Hendrikus Schweppe (10 October 1938) is a Dutch tenor. He was one of the pioneers of historically informed performance of Baroque and Renaissance music. He has also sung Baroque opera, worked as conductor and as an academic teacher.

== Career ==
Born in Amsterdam, Marius van Altena graduated from the Conservatorium van Amsterdam. In 1973, he was the Evangelist in the first historically informed performance in the Netherlands of Bach's St Matthew Passion. Johan van der Meer conducted the Groningse Bachvereniging, the Vox Christi was Max van Egmond, the other soloists were three boys of the Tölzer Knabenchor, René Jacobs, Harry Geraerts, Michiel ten Houte de Lange, Frits van Erven Dorens and Harry van der Kamp. Ton Koopman and Bob van Asperen played the organs. The performance was recorded live. With van der Meer he performed and recorded Bach's Mass in B minor in 1975 at the Holland Festival, the orchestra was La Petite Bande with concert master Sigiswald Kuijken). In 1969 van der Meer conducted Bach's St John Passion in Groningen.

Van Altena sang the tenor part in several Bach cantatas in the Das Kantatenwerk series, the project to record all the sacred cantatas for the label Teldec. His contributions included the first volume in 1972 with the Tölzer Knabenchor (Chorus Master: Gerhard Schmidt-Gaden), the King's College Choir (Chorus Master: David Willcocks) and the Leonhardt-Consort conducted by Gustav Leonhardt. He recorded several cantatas for the following volumes, some with the Tölzer Knabenchor, others with the Knabenchor Hannover (Chorus Master: Heinz Hennig).

Van Altena has collaborated with the choir Junge Kantorei, conducted by Joachim Martini, singing in Eberbach Abbey Monteverdi's Marienvesper (1977, 1978, 1984), Bach's Matthäuspassion (1981) and Messe in h-Moll (1982). In 1988, he was a soloist for a recording of sacred music by Orlando di Lasso, "Patrocinium musices", conducted by Erik Van Nevel. In 1992, he was part of a vocal ensemble which performed Renaissance madrigals, conducted by Konrad Junghänel, including works by Andrea Gabrieli, Ippolito Baccusi, Girolamo Conversi, Giovanni Ferretti, Giovanni Giacomo Gastoldi, Giovanni de Macque, Luca Marenzio, Philippe de Monte, Cornelis Verdonck and Hubert Waelrant. In 1995, he recorded six cantatas by Dieterich Buxtehude, conducted by Jos van Immerseel. He has performed as a member of the Huelgas Ensemble, conducted by Paul Van Nevel. In 1995 they recorded "Tears Of Lisbon", a collection of works by Portuguese Renaissance composers such as Joaquim Pimentel, Fontes Rocha, Paulo Valentim, Manuel Mendes, Armando Machado, Francisco Viana and Fernando Tordo.

In the field of Baroque opera, he appeared at the Holland Festival in 1974 in Agostino Agazzari's Eumelio and in Sigmund Theophil Staden's Seelewig. In 1980, he appeared in Gluck’s L'île de Merlin. From 1980 to 1984 he participated in opera performances of the company Spectaculum in Vienna, including works by Johann Joseph Fux, Emperor Leopold I and Francesco Bartolomeo Conti.

He has also been employed as a pedagogue in Hague Conservatory and the Tilburg Conservatory. He has worked as a conductor since 1985. In 1999 and 2005 he was on the jury of the competition for Baroque instruments and singing of the festival Musica Antiqua Bruges.
