= Es ist nichts Gesundes an meinem Leibe, BWV 25 =

Cantata by Johann Sebastian Bach

Es ist nichts Gesundes an meinem Leibe
- BWV 25
- Church cantata by J. S. Bach
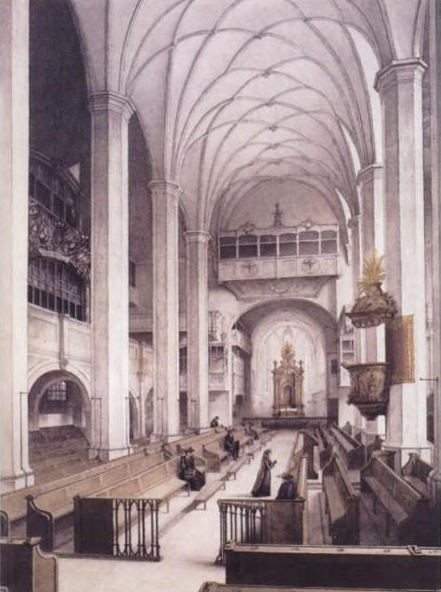
- Thomaskirche, Leipzig
- Occasion: 14th Sunday after Trinity
- Cantata text: Johann Jacob Rambach?
- Chorale: by Johann Heermann
- Performed: 29 August 1723: Leipzig
- Movements: six
- Vocal: SATB choir; solo: soprano, tenor and bass
- Instrumental: cornetto; 3 trombones; 3 recorders; 2 oboes; 2 violins; viola; continuo

Johann Sebastian Bach composed the church cantata Es ist nichts Gesundes an meinem Leibe (There is nothing sound in my body), BWV 25 in Leipzig for the 14th Sunday after Trinity and first performed it on 29 August 1723.

== History and words ==
Bach composed the cantata in 1723 in his first year as Thomaskantor in Leipzig for the 14th Sunday after Trinity. The prescribed readings for the Sunday were from the Epistle to the Galatians, Paul's teaching on "works of the flesh" and "fruit of the Spirit" (Galatians 5:16–24), and from the Gospel of Luke, Cleansing ten lepers (Luke 17:11–19). According to Christoph Wolff, the cantata text was written by Johann Jacob Rambach and published in 1720 in Halle in Geistliche Poesien. The poet relates to the Gospel and compares the situation of man in general to that of the lepers. The sickness is first expressed in words from Psalm 38, Psalms 38:4. As Julian Mincham observes, "sin, decay, God's fury and the rotting of bones permeate much Lutheran theology in general and this opening chorus in particular". At the end of the third movement, Jesus is asked to heal. The last aria expressed the hope to sing thanks for it in the choir of the angels. The cantata is closed by the 12th and final stanza of Johann Heermann's hymn "Treuer Gott, ich muss dir klagen" (1630).

Bach first performed the cantata on 29 August 1723.

== Scoring and structure ==
The cantata in six movements is scored for three vocal soloists (soprano, tenor and bass), a four-part choir, and a colourful Baroque instrumental ensemble of cornetto, three trombones, three recorders, two oboes, two violins, viola, and basso continuo.

Movements of Es ist nichts Gesundes an meinem Leibe
No.	Title	Text	Type	Vocal	Winds	Brass	Strings	Key	Time
1	Es ist nichts Gesundes an meinem Leibe		Chorus	SATB	3 flutes/recorders, 2 oboes	1 cornetto, 3 trombones	2 violins, viola, basso continuo	A minor	4/4
2	Die ganze Welt ist nur ein Hospital		Recitative	Tenor			Basso continuo		4/4
3	Ach, wo hol ich Armer Rat?		Aria	Bass			Basso continuo	D minor	4/4
4	O Jesu, lieber Meister		Recitative	Soprano			Basso continuo		4/4
5	Öffne meinen schlechten Liedern		Aria	Soprano	3 flutes/recorder, 2 oboes		2 violins, viola, basso continuo	C major	3/8
6	Ich will alle meine Tage		Chorale	SATB	3 flutes/recorders (col soprano), oboe (col soprano), oboe (coll'alto)	Cornetto (col soprano), trombone (coll'alto), trombone (col tenore), trombone (col basso)	Violin (col soprano), violin (coll'alto), viola (col tenore), basso continuo	C major	4/4

== Music ==
Similar to Du sollt Gott, deinen Herren, lieben, BWV 77, composed a week before, Bach creates the opening chorus as a chorale fantasia on a complete instrumental quotation of a chorale tune. The melody is known as "Herzlich tut mich verlangen nach meinem selgen End". But probably Bach had in mind the words of "Ach Herr, mich armen Sünder" which he used later in his chorale cantata Ach Herr, mich armen Sünder, BWV 135, a paraphrase of Psalm 6 which begins in stanza 2 "Heil du mich, lieber Herre, denn ich bin krank und schwach" (Heal me, dear Lord, because I am sick and weak). In a complex structure, Bach combines an instrumental introduction with the chorale tune in long notes in the continuo with figuration of strings and oboes, a choral double fugue, and the presentation of the choral by a choir of trombones with the cornetto as the soprano instrument, reinforced by three recorders which play an octave higher. John Eliot Gardiner regards the unusual use of the trombones, playing the chorale tune independent of the voices, as an "anticipation of the finale to Beethoven's Fifth Symphony".

The following three movements are all only accompanied by the continuo. A new perspective is opened in movement 5 in dance music for a concerto of strings and oboes, echoed by the recorders. The music relates to the text "im höhern Chor werde mit den Engeln singen" (in the exalted choir I shall sing with the angels). The closing chorale is set for four parts.

== Recordings ==
- J. S. Bach: Das Kantatenwerk – Sacred Cantatas Vol. 2, Nikolaus Harnoncourt, Wiener Sängerknaben, Chorus Viennensis, Concentus Musicus Wien, soloists of the Wiener Sängerknaben, Kurt Equiluz, Max van Egmond, Teldec 1972
- Die Bach Kantate Vol. 48, Helmuth Rilling, Gächinger Kantorei, Bach-Collegium Stuttgart, Arleen Augér, Adalbert Kraus, Philippe Huttenlocher, Hänssler 1978
- J. S. Bach: Complete Cantatas Vol. 7, Ton Koopman, Amsterdam Baroque Orchestra & Choir, Lisa Larsson, Gerd Türk, Klaus Mertens, Antoine Marchand 1997
- J. S. Bach: Cantatas Vol. 13 – Cantatas from Leipzig 1723, Masaaki Suzuki, Bach Collegium Japan, Yukari Nonoshita, Gerd Türk, Peter Kooy, BIS 1999
- Bach Edition Vol. 19 – Cantatas Vol. 10, Pieter Jan Leusink, Holland Boys Choir, Netherlands Bach Collegium, Marjon Strijk, Knut Schoch, Bas Ramselaar, Brilliant Classics 2000
- Bach Cantatas Vol. 7: Ambronay / Bremen / For the 14th Sunday after Trinity / For the Feast of St Michael and All Angels, John Eliot Gardiner, Monteverdi Choir, English Baroque Soloists, Malin Hartelius, James Gilchrist, Peter Harvey, Soli Deo Gloria 2000
- Ach süßer Trost!, Philippe Herreweghe, Collegium Vocale Gent, 2012
