= Peter Lika =

German operatic bass (born 1947)

Peter Lika (born 1947) is a German bass in opera and concert, focused on both oratorio singing as on historically informed performances.

== Life ==
Lika was born in Augsburg in 1947. He began his singing career as a boy soloist with the Regensburger Domspatzen. He studied voice in Munich, and won prizes at competitions in there, in Geneva and Verviers. He was a member of the Stadttheater Augsburg from 1972 to 1977, and again from 1980 to 1981. He performed with the Bayerische Kammeroper in Veitshöchheim, a chamber opera where Baroque operas were performed in historically informed performance.

He became known for singing and recording the title roles in Mendelsohn's oratorio's Elias and Paulus, in Max Bruch's Moses oratorio, and in Haydn's Die Schöpfung and Die Jahreszeiten. Lika performed with conductors such as Kurt Masur, Peter Schreier, Helmuth Rilling, John Eliot Gardiner, Neville Marriner, Roger Norrington, Sergiu Celibidache and Philippe Herreweghe and orchestras such as the Gewandhaus Orchestra, Bamberger Symphoniker, Chicago Symphony Orchestra, the Israel Philharmonic Orchestra and German radio orchestras. He toured in Europe, Asia and the U.S..

He took part in the Salzburg Festival, in 1986 in a church concert, and in 1989 in a concert performance of Orff's Antigonae (as a messenger). In 1991 he sang the bass solo in Mozart's Requiem in Brussels.

Lika is experienced in historically informed performance. His repertoire also includes Lieder, recording Schubert lieder with Wolfgang Sawallisch.

Lika is married and has six sons, two from his first and four from his second marriage, including Benedikt Lika.

== Recordings ==
- Bach: Matthäus-Passion, Gustav Leonhardt cond., with René Jacobs, David Cordier, Christoph Prégardien, Markus Schäfer, John Elwes, Max van Egmond, Klaus Mertens, Tölzer Knabenchor, La Petite Bande, men's choir of La Petite Bande (1990, Dhm/Sony BMG, 3-CD-box)
- Haydn: Die Jahreszeiten, Sigiswald Kuijken cond., with Krisztina Laki, Helmut Wildhaber, Choir of the Flanders Opera, La Petite Bande (1992, Virgin Cla/EMI, 2-CD-box)
- Mendelssohn: Paulus, Joshard Daus cond., with Hellen Kwon, Elzbieta Ardam, Hans Peter Blochwitz, Bach-Ensemble of the Europa Chor Akademie, SWR Sinfonieorchester Baden-Baden und Freiburg (1998, Arte Nova/Sony BMG, 2-CD-box)
- Mendelssohn: Elias, Jürgen Budday cond., with Heidi Elisabeth Meier, Jolantha Michalska-Taliaferro, Hans Peter Blochwitz, Kantorei Maulbronn, members of the SWR-Sinfonieorchester (live), (2003, Edition Kloster Maulbronn, K&K Verlagsanstalt, 2-CD-box)
- Bruch: Moses, Jürgen Budday cond., with Birgitte Christensen, Stefan Vinke, Kantorei Maulbronn, Russische Kammerphilharmonie St. Petersburg (live), (2005, Edition Kloster Maulbronn, K&K Verlagsanstalt, 2-CD-box)
