= Dorothea Röschmann =

Opera singer

- Born: 17 June 1967 (age 59); Flensburg, Schleswig-Holstein, West Germany
- Education: Hochschule für Musik und Theater Hamburg
- Occupation: Soprano singer
- Years active: 1986–present
- Organisation: Berlin State Opera
- Title: Kammersängerin
- Awards: Grammy Awards

Dorothea Röschmann (born 17 June 1967) is a German soprano. She is known for Lieder and performances in Mozart operas.

== Early life ==
Röschmann was born in Flensburg, and sang with the Flensburg Bach Choir by the age of seven. She studied at the Hochschule für Musik und Theater Hamburg, under Barbara Schlick at the Akademie für Alte Musik in Bremen, and subsequently in Los Angeles, New York, Tel Aviv, and under Vera Rózsa in London.

== Career ==
Röschmann has been working as a Lieder and concert singer, both in Germany and abroad since 1986. From 1994 to 2000, she was a member of the ensemble at the Berlin State Opera, where she had great success in roles such as Susanna in The Marriage of Figaro, Zerlina in Don Giovanni, Ännchen in Der Freischütz (conducted by Zubin Mehta), Nannetta in Falstaff (conducted by Claudio Abbado), Micaëla in Carmen, Pamina in The Magic Flute, Fiordiligi in Così fan tutte. She still returns frequently as a guest singer.

She gained international recognition in 1995 with her Salzburg Festival debut, where she sang Susanna in The Marriage of Figaro staged by Luc Bondy, conducted by Nikolaus Harnoncourt. She became a regular guest soloist in Salzburg, returning to consecutive seasons in The Marriage of Figaro (Susanna), La clemenza di Tito (Servilia), The Magic Flute (Pamina), Idomeneo (Ilia). In 1998, she performed Norina in Don Pasquale with La Monnaie, and was engaged as Ännchen in the premiere of the new Der Freischütz conducted by Mehta at the Bavarian State Opera, where she returned in later seasons in new productions of Beethoven's Fidelio, Stravinsky's The Rake's Progress, and Handel's Rodelinda. In 2000, she debuted at the Paris Opera in The Magic Flute staged at the Palais Garnier.

In 2003, she made her Royal Opera, London debut with Pamina in David McVicar's new Magic Flute production. In summer, she assumed the role of Vitellia in La clemenza di Tito at the Salzburg Festival. Later in the year, she debuted at the Metropolitan Opera in Susanna, and at the Vienna State Opera in the same role.

She sang her first Contessa d'Almaviva in The Marriage of Figaro in 2004 at the Ravinia Festival. In 2006 she appeared as the role at the Royal Opera House (director: David McVicar; conductor: Antonio Pappano) and the Salzburg Festival (again with Harnoncourt conducting, and staged by Claus Guth). She also sang it at La Scala in Milan in March 2012.

As a concert singer she took part in Ton Koopman's Bach cantatas project.

On 10 September 2011, she took part in the performance of Gustav Mahler's Symphony No. 2, in a New York Philharmonic concert at Avery Fisher Hall in Lincoln Center. The free concert, presented to commemorate the tenth anniversary of the 9/11 terrorist attack on New York City, was conducted by Alan Gilbert and telecast on PBS on that anniversary.

In January 2015, she performed in the premiere of Michael Thalheimer's Der Freischütz, in the role of Agathe, at the Berlin State Opera, and returned in November for the premiere of Jürgen Flimm's The Marriage of Figaro. In April 2015, Röschmann embarked a Northern American concert and recitals tour. She was featured in Chicago Symphony Orchestra's Mozart and Schumann programme, where she interpreted Frauen-Liebe und Leben accompanied by Mitsuko Uchida. She then teamed up with Les Violons du Roy in performances involving Purcell's Dido and Aeneas, excerpts of King Arthur and The Fairy-Queen. She further re-joined Uchida in a recital tour.

She debuted the role of Desdemona in Verdi's Otello in March 2016 at the Salzburg Easter Festival under Christian Thielemann.

== Personal life ==
Röschmann is married to Thalia Theater actor Christoph Bantzer. They live together in Hamburg with their daughter Clara, who was born in 2005.

== Discography ==
- Stabat Mater (Pergolesi), Stabat Mater (Vivaldi), In furore giutissimae irae (1994). Les Violons du Roy, Bernard Labadie, Catherine Robbin. Dorian Recordings.
- Messiah (Handel) (1997). Fink, Gritton, Daniels, Davies. Gabrieli Consort & Players, Paul McCreesh. Archiv Produktion.
- J.S. Bach: Christmas Oratorio (1997). Scholl, Güra, Häger. Akademie für Alte Musik Berlin, RIAS Kammerchor, René Jacobs. Harmonia Mundi.
- Haendel Deutsche Arien (2000). Akademie für Alte Musik Berlin. Harmonia Mundi.
- Bach: St Matthew Passion (2001). Arnold Schoenberg Choir, Vienna Boys' Choir, Concentus Musicus Wien, Nikolaus Harnoncourt. Teldec.
- The Creation (Haydn) (2003). Arnold Schoenberg Choir, Concentus Musicus Wien, Nikolaus Harnoncourt. Deutsche Harmonia Mundi, Live recording: 26–30 March 2003, Musikvereinssaal.
- Stabat Mater (Pergolesi) (2006). David Daniels (countertenor). Europa Galante, Fabio Biondi. Virgin Classics.
- Mozart: The Magic Flute (2006). Arnold Schoenberg Choir, Mahler Chamber Orchestra, Claudio Abbado. Deutsche Grammophon.
- A German Requiem (Brahms) (2007). Thomas Quasthoff. Berlin Philharmonic, Berlin Radio Choir, Simon Rattle. EMI Classics, Recorded in concert: 26–29 October 2006, Philharmonie, Berlin.
- Portraits: Songs by Schubert, Schumann, Strauss, Wolf (2014). Malcolm Martineau. Sony Classical Records.
- Schumann: Liederkreis, Frauenliebe und Leben, Seven Early Songs (Berg) (2015). Mitsuko Uchida. Decca Records, Recorded live: 2 & 5 May 2015, Wigmore Hall
- Mozart Arias (2015). Swedish Radio Symphony Orchestra, Daniel Harding. Sony Classical Records.

== Awards and honours ==
- Echo Klassik 2003 with Ian Bostridge for the best Lied recording (The Songs of Robert Schumann, Hyperion Records)
- Grammy Award 2002 for the Best Choral Performance with the Vienna Boys' Choir, the Concentus Musicus Wien and the Arnold Schoenberg Choir (Bach: St Matthew Passion, Teldec)
- Berliner Kammersängerin in 2016
- Grammy Award 2017 for the Best Classical Solo Vocal Album (Schumann & Berg, accompanied by Mitsuko Uchida, Decca)
