= Das neugeborne Kindelein, BWV 122 =

Chorale cantata by Johann Sebastian Bach

Das neugeborne Kindelein
- BWV 122
- Chorale cantata by J. S. Bach
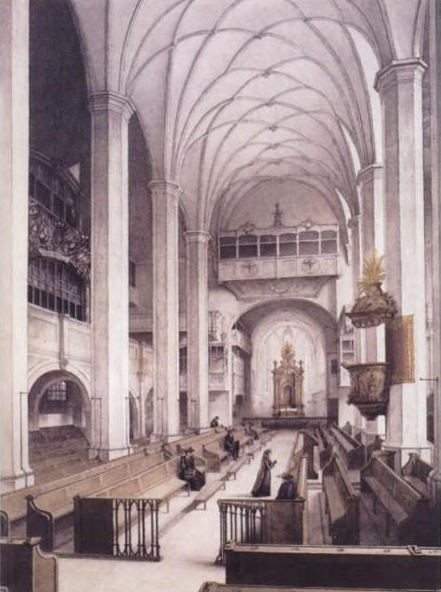
- Thomaskirche, Leipzig
- Occasion: Sunday after Christmas
- Chorale: "Das neugeborne Kindelein" by Cyriakus Schneegaß
- Performed: 31 December 1724: Leipzig

Das neugeborne Kindelein (The newborn little Child), BWV 122, (Note: "BWV" is Bach-Werke-Verzeichnis, a thematic catalogue of Bach's works.) is a church cantata by Johann Sebastian Bach. Bach composed the chorale cantata in six movements in Leipzig for the Sunday after Christmas and first performed it on 31 December 1724. It is based on a 1597 hymn of the same name by Cyriakus Schneegaß. The work is part of Bach's chorale cantata cycle; in the format of this cycle, the text of the first and last stanzas of the hymn is retained unchanged while the text of the inner stanzas was paraphrased by an unknown librettist into a sequence of alternating arias and recitatives. The cantata is opened by a chorale fantasia and closed by a chorale setting. It is scored for four vocal soloists, a four-part choir, and a Baroque instrumental ensemble of recorders, oboes, strings and basso continuo.

== History, hymn and text ==
Bach composed the cantata in his second year as Thomaskantor in Leipzig for the Sunday after Christmas. The prescribed readings for the Sunday were from the Epistle to the Galatians, "through Christ we are free from the law" (Galatians 4:1–7), and from the Gospel of Luke, Simeon and Anna talking to Mary (Luke 2:33–40). The chorale cantata is based on a hymn with the same title by Cyriakus Schneegaß (1597). This hymn is extremely short, with three stanzas of only four lines each, and reflects the turn of the year more prominently than the birth of Jesus mentioned in the first line. This was suitable as the Sunday after Christmas fell on the last day of the calendar year in 1724. The unknown librettist made no effort to connect to the Gospel reading.

Bach first performed the cantata on 31 December 1724.

== Music ==
=== Structure and scoring ===
Bach structured the cantata in six movements, beginning with a chorale fantasia, followed by a series of alternating arias and recitatives, and concluded by a chorale. He scored it for four vocal soloists (soprano (S), alto (A), tenor (T) and bass (B)), and a Baroque instrumental ensemble of three recorders (Rc), two oboes, taille (Ta), two violin parts (Vl), a viola part (Va), and basso continuo (Bc) with organ.

In the following table of the movements, the scoring, keys and time signatures are taken from Alfred Dürr's standard work Die Kantaten von Johann Sebastian Bach, using the symbol for common time (4/4). The continuo, playing throughout, is not shown.

Movements of Das neugeborne Kindelein
No.	Title	Text	Type	Vocal	Winds	Strings	Key	Time
1	Das neugeborne Kindelein	Schneegass	Chorale fantasia	SATB	2Ob Ta	2Vl Va	G minor	3/8
2	O Menschen, die ihr täglich sündigt	anon.	Aria	B			C minor	common time
3	Die Engel, welche sich zuvor	anon.	Recitative	S	3Rc		G minor	common time
4	Ist Gott versöhnt und unser Freund	anon.	Aria and chorale	ST A		2Vl 2Va	D minor	common time
5	Dies ist ein Tag, den selbst der Herr gemacht	anon.	Recitative	B		2Vl Va		common time
6	Es bringt das rechte Jubeljahr	Schneegass	Chorale	B	2Ob Ta	2Vl Va	G minor	3/4

=== Movements ===
The opening chorus is a chorale fantasia with a long opening and closing ritornello framing a chorale theme with four entries and lengthy interspersed episodes. The three lower voices imitate the soprano thrice in the chorale phrases and then move into a fast ascending figure.

The second movement is a long and chromatic bass aria discussing sündigt (sinning). This is the longest movement of the cantata. The continuo accompanying the vocal line was described as "tortuous and chromatically convoluted".

The soprano recitative is accompanied by a simple recorder trio, a combination designed to represent the "aura of the angels". As this is the only movement to include the recorders, the parts were likely performed by the oboe and taille players.

The fourth movement is a trio of the soprano, alto and tenor voices; the alto sings the chorale line with the strings while the soprano and tenor perform a duet aria. The movement is in D minor and 6/8 time.

The bass recitative begins in major before modulating to the G minor of the final movement. It is accompanied by high chordal strings and a continuo line.

The closing chorale is fast and short. It is in block form.

The "rather muted" music of the first chorus and the bass aria (the opening line of which translates as "O mortals, ye who sin daily") have been described by one writer as giving listeners a "moral hangover" after the possible overindulgence of the Christmas holidays.

== Publication ==
The cantata was published in 1878 with other church cantatas as part of the first complete edition of Bach's works (Joh. Seb. Bach's Werke). The editor was Alfred Dörffel.

== Recordings ==
- Wiener Kammerchor / Vienna State Opera Orchestra. J. S. Bach: Cantatas BWV 122 and BWV 133. Vanguard Bach Guild, 1952.

=== Series ===
The cantata is available as part of series:

==== Recordings of the complete Bach cantatas ====
- Frankfurter Kantorei / Bach-Collegium Stuttgart. Die Bach Kantate. Hänssler. 1972 (rereleased as part of a 6-CD set "Advent and Christmas Cantatas" in 2009). Helen Donath, Helen Watts, Adalbert Kraus, Niklaus Tuller.
- the pioneering set using period instruments on Teldec (Vol. 30, Das Kantatenwerk). Nikolaus Harnoncourt. 1981
- the set conducted by Ton Koopman (Vol. 13, Bach cantatas. 2003)
- the projected set on ATMA Classique (Bach: Cantates pour la Nativité / Intégrale des cantates sacrées Vol. 4). Eric J. Milnes, Montréal Baroque, Monika Mauch, Matthew White, Charles Daniels, Harry van der Kamp. 2007

==== Recordings of several cantatas ====
- Christmas contatas (J. S. Bach: Cantates de Nöel). Philippe Herreweghe. Collegium Vocale Gent. Harmonia Mundi, 1995.
