= David Cordier =

English operatic countertenor (1959–2025)

- David Cordier, c. 2000
- Born: 1 May 1959; Rochester, Kent, England
- Died: 19 May 2025 (aged 66)
- Education: University of Cambridge; Royal College of Music
- Occupation: Countertenor
- Organizations: King's College Choir

David Cordier (1 May 1959 – 19 May 2025) was an English countertenor. He made an international career based in Germany, and appeared both in concert and opera. While focused on roles by Handel such as Radamisto, he also performed in contemporary opera, including works by Aribert Reimann and Péter Eötvös.

== Life and career ==
Born in Rochester, Kent, on 1 May 1959, Cordier was initially a boy soprano in the Cathedral Choir of his home town and a member of King's College Choir in Cambridge. After studying mathematics at the University of Cambridge, graduating with a master's degree, he studied voice at the Royal College of Music in London.

He moved to Berlin in the 1980s where he regularly performed with Gustav Leonhardt and Musica Antiqua Köln. He later took residence in Cologne. Cordier's repertoire includes music of the 16th and 17th centuries, and contemporary music. He is known for his interpretations of roles in operas by Georg Friedrich Handel, including the title roles of Giulio Cesare, Ezio, Ottone, Radamisto and Flavio. He appeared as Hamor in a staged version by Dietrich Hilsdorf of Handel's oratorio Jephtha at the Theater Bonn.

Roles in contemporary opera included Edgar in Aribert Reimann's Lear, Oberon in Britten's A Midsummer Night's Dream, Ligeti's Le Grand Macabre and one of the three sisters all scored for countertenor in Tri sestry by Eötvös.

Cordier died after a long illness on 19 May 2025, at the age of 66.

== Recordings ==
Cordier was an alto soloist in the first recording by Gustav Leonhardt of Bach's St Matthew Passion, released in 1989, with the Tölzer Knabenchor and the men's choir and orchestra of La Petite Bande, Christoph Prégardien as the Evangelist and Max van Egmond as the vox Christi. In 1995, he recorded Bach's cantata for Ratswahl (council election), Gott ist mein König, BWV 71, with Wolfgang Unger conducting the Thüringischer Akademischer Singkreis, Pauliner Barockensemble and Leipziger Bläser-Collegium. He performed the role of La Musica in Monteverdi's L'Orfeo at Het Muziektheater in Amsterdam in July 1997 which was recorded on DVD, directed by Pierre Audi and conducted by Stephen Stubbs, with John Mark Ainsley in the title role. A reviewer described his opening as "very arresting". He took part in a live recording of Handel's oratorio Gideon at Eberbach Abbey in 2003, with the Junge Kantorei and the Frankfurter Barockorchester conducted by Joachim Carlos Martini, and Knut Schoch singing the title role.

Entitled My Mind to Me a Kingdom Is, he recorded English songs for countertenor, some of which were accompanied by harpist Andrew Lawrence-King, others by the ensemble Tragicomedia conducted by Stephen Stubbs, some with Stubbs as lutenist, including:

- "My mind to me a kingdom is"
- "Goe from my window" (anonymous)
- "Greensleeves" (traditional)
- "In a merry May morn" (Richard Nicholson)
- "Lachrimae Antiquae" (Dowland)
- "Lullaby my sweet little baby" (William Byrd)
- "Venus' birds" (John Bennet)
