= Harry Geraerts =

Dutch tenor

Harry Geraerts (born 22 August 1945) is a Dutch tenor. His repertoire includes the great oratorios, baroque operas, ensemble music and Lieder, especially in the field of Renaissance and Baroque music.

== Life ==
Born in Utrecht, Geraerts attended school in Utrecht and sang in the boys' choir of St. Martin's Cathedral, Utrecht. In 1972, he became the first private student of Max van Egmond in Amsterdam, as at that time there were no courses of study for early music majoring in singing. In the late 1970s and early 1980s, he was a member of the baroque ensemble "De Egelentier". For about three decades he performed at the major early music festivals. He regularly held master classes at the University of Michigan in the US.

Geraerts has an international reputation and has performed in almost all European countries, as well as in the US and Israel. In the field of early music, he has appeared as a singer in baroque operas, oratorios and in ensemble music. As a lieder singer, he has recorded the Winterreise by Franz Schubert with Ludger Rémy on the fortepiano.

His numerous radio performances and recordings include important works by Johann Sebastian Bach such as some of his cantatas, the St. John Passion and the St. Matthew Passion with Johan van der Meer. His clear voice is appreciated "without vocal equalization and without vibrato, i.e. always razor sharp on the tone", and his lively declamation, which is strongly influenced by the musical rhetoric of the Baroque. Konrad Klek praises Geraerts as the oratorio singer of Bach's great vocal works: "I have never experienced such German linguistic power with any German singer.

As a singer he has worked with well-known European ensembles such as the Groningse Bachvereniging, the Fiori musicali, the Musicalische Compagney, the Ensemble Weser-Renaissance Bremen, Leonhardt-Consort and the Alsfelder Vokalensemble.

In 2003, he moved from his hometown Utrecht to the South of France, where he had the dilapidated St.-Guiraud Castle restored in Castelnau-Barbarens near Auch. In the Auch Cathedral he gave several concerts with the titular organist Anton Stiller on the local baroque organ from 1694 and the vocal ensemble Capella Auscitensis.

== Recordings ==
- Heinrich Schütz: Symphoniae sacrae. Eigenproduktion 6810 167, 1972 (with Groningse Bachvereniging, Berliner Ensemble für Alte Musik, Johan van der Meer).
- Johann Sebastian Bach: Matthäus-Passion (Auszüge). 1973 (with Solisten des Tölzer Knabenchors, René Jacobs, Marius van Altena, Michiel ten Houte de Lange, Max van Egmond, Harry van der Kamp, Frits van Erven Dorens, Groningse Bachvereniging, Leonhardt-Consort, Alarius Ensemble, musica da camera).
- Johann Sebastian Bach: Kreuzstab Cantata, BWV 56 / Ich habe genug, BWV 82. Philips 6575 093 [61], 1977 (with Max van Egmond, Baroque Orchestra, Frans Brüggen).
- Johann Sebastian Bach: Johannes-Passion. 1979 (with Marjanne Kweksilber, Charles Brett, Marius van Altena, Max van Egmond, Harry van der Kamp, Groningse Bachvereniging, Fiori musicali).
- Gilles Binchois: Chansons. Alpha Brussels MBM 40, 1979 (with Ensemble Kaproen).
- Heinrich Schütz: Symphoniæ Sacræ I (Venedig 1629). Arion 38604, 1980 (with Musicalische Compagney).
- Aus den Tagebüchern des Orlando di Lasso. Musique En Wallonie MW 84524, 1982 (with Ensemble Dialogo Musicale, Hans Ludwig Hirsch).
- Henry Desmarest: Deux grands motets lorrains. Erato STU 71511 REC 350, 1983 (with Barbara Schlick, Mieke van der Sluis, Harry van der Kamp, Fiori musicali).
- Heinrich Schütz / Johann Seb. Bach: Musikalische Exequien / Gottes Zeit ist die allerbeste Zeit. Teldec 66.23335-0, 1983 with Staats- Und Domchor Berlin, Christian Grube)
- Heinrich Schütz and Giovanni Gabrieli: Psalmen, Concerti und Motetten. Musikproduktion Ambitus amb 97843, 1985 (with Musicalische Compagney).
- Heinrich Schütz: Weihnachtshistorie. MD+G L 3229, 1986 (with Musicalische Compagney).
- Heinrich Schütz: Liebe und Klage. Hochzeits-Concerti, Dialoge und Hohe-Lied-Kompositionen. MD+G L 3230, 1986 (with Musicalische Compagney).
- Vincent Lübeck: Sämtliche Kantaten. Motette CD 50181, 1986 (with David Cordier, Graham Pushee, Harry van der Kamp, New College Choir Oxford).
- François Couperin: Mis voor orgel, „Messe propre pour les couvents de religieux et de religieuses“. 1990 (with Pierre-Yves Asselin).
- Franz Schubert: Die Winterreise. MD+G L 3391, 1991 (with Ludger Rémy).
- Palestrina/Bach: Missa sine nomine. EMI CDC 7544552, 1991 (with Concerto Palatino).
- Orlando di Lasso: Deutsche Lieder. Ambitius, 1991 (with Musica Canterey Bamberg, Gerhard Weinzierl).
- The Apocryphal Bach Cantatas BWV 217–222. CPO 999 139–2, 1992 (with Alsfelder Vokalensemble, Wolfgang Helbich).
- Nordniederländische Orgelkunst. Coronata, COR 1217, 1992 (with Stef Tuinstra).
- Orlando di Lasso: Musik am Hofe Bamberger Fürst Bischöfe I. Ambitus amb 97895, 1992 (with Musica Canterey Bamberg, Gerhard Weinzierl).
- Johann Sebastian Bach: Kaffeekantate BWV 211 / Bauernkantate BWV 212. Discodom DSD 0094.2, 1993 (with Monika Frimmer, Peter Kooy, De Nederlandse Cantorij).
- Heinrich Scheidemann: Sämtliche Orgelmotetten. Orlando di Lasso, Hans Leo Haßler. Ambitus amb 97946, 1995 (with Musicalische Compagney, Klaus Eichhorn).
- Johann Rosenmüller: Venezianische Vespermusik. Ambitus, Amb 97949, 1995 (with Musicalische Compagney).
- Gabrieli Tedesco. Das Spätwerk Giovanni Gabrieli's aus deutschen Quellen. CPO 99 454–2, 1996 (with Musicalische Compagney).
- Jacob Praetorius: Motets & Organ Works. CPO 999215–2, 1996 (with Weser-Renaissance, Harald Vogel).
- Iacobus Regnart: Stabat Mater. CPO 999 507–2, 1996 (with Weser-Renaissance).
- Friedens-Seufftzer Und Jubel-Geschrey / Music For The Peace Of Westphalia 1648. CPO 999 571–2, 1997 (with Weser-Renaissance).
- Heinrich Schütz: Geistliche Chormusik 1648. Capriccio 10858/59; Bayerischer Rundfunk LC 87484, 1998 (with Musicalische Compagney and Tölzer Knabenchor)
- In Terra Pax. Fest-Concerte zum Westfälischen Frieden. Ambitus, amb 97 920, 1998 (with Musicalische Conmpagney).
- Ludwig Senfl: Deutsche Lieder / Carmina. CPO, 1999 (with Weser-Renaissance).
- Hans Leo Hassler: Motets and Organ Works. CPO 999 723–2, 2000 (with Weser-Renaissance).
- Lieder/lustick zu syngen/zu fleiten und schwegelen. Cornetto, 2000 (with Columna Sonans).
- Festive Hanseatic Music. CPO 999 782–2, 2000 (with Weser-Renaissance).
- Gabrieli Superiore. Motetten und Canzonen von Giovanni Gabrieli. Querstand VKJK 0019, 2001 (with Musicalische Compagney).
- Orlando di Lasso: Bußpsalmen Nr. 1–3. Capriccio 67018, 2003 (with Tölzer Knabenchor).
- Orlando di Lasso. Bußpsalmen Nr. 4–7. Capriccio 67130; Bayerischer Rundfunk, LC 67130, 2004 (with Tölzer Knabenchor).
- Johann Sebastian Bach: Stil'Antico-Motetten à 4. Rondeau-LC 06690, 2008 (with Musicalische Compagney).
