= Jacques Villisech =

French opera singer

- Born: 21 November 1932; Nanterre
- Died: 31 October 2021 (aged 88); La Verrière
- Education: Conservatoire National Supérieur de Musique
- Occupations: Classical bass-baritone; Academic teacher

Jacques Villisech was a French bass-baritone in opera and concert. He was an early specialist singing Baroque music in historically informed performance.

== Career ==
Villisech was an actor and singer in the theatre company of Jean-Louis Barrault. He studied at the Conservatoire National Supérieur de Musique, and continued his studies at the Mozarteum in Salzburg and the Academy Chigiana in Siena. He was a prize-winner at the ARD International Music Competition in Munich.

In opera, he appeared in both serious and comic bass parts, such as the title role in Massenet's Don Quichotte, Don Basile in Rossini's Il barbiere di Siviglia, Geronimo in Cimarosa's Il matrimonio segreto, and Prince Gremin in Tchaikovsky's Eugene Onegin.

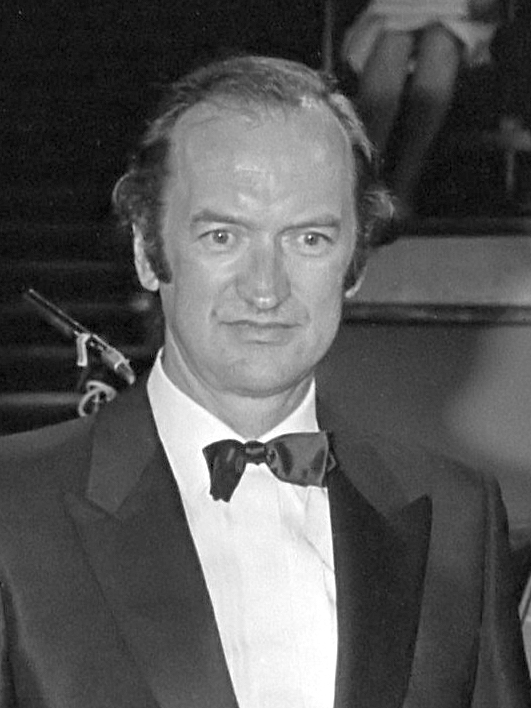
Nikolaus Harnoncourt, who conducted pioneering recordings of Monteverdi's operas and Bach's St John Passion

Villisech performed in 1965 the bass arias in the pioneering recording of Nikolaus Harnoncourt of Bach's St John Passion, with Kurt Equiluz as the Evangelist and Max van Egmond as the vox Christi (voice of Christ). In the Harnoncourt recordings of Monteverdi's operas, he appeared as Plutone in L'Orfeo, alongside Rotraud Hansmann as Euridice and Lajos Kozma as Orfeo.

He recorded several Bach cantatas with the Monteverdi-Chor, conducted by Jürgen Jürgens, including the Actus tragicus and the secular Hunting Cantata. He was the soloist in Bach's secular cantata on an Italian text Amore traditore, conducted by Gustav Leonhardt. He recorded the Requiem by Camille Saint-Saëns with the Ensemble chorale Counterpoint and the Orchestre lyrique de l'ORTF, conducted by Jean-Gabriel Gaussens.

Villisech was a voice teacher at the Conservatoire National de Région de Versailles. He founded a vocal ensemble called Quartet of Versailles.

== Author ==
Villisech was a published author. His book Trop c'est trop ("Enough is enough") was awarded the 1990 Prix de la Fureur de Lire. He wrote a comedy titled Confit de générations and penned a stage adaptation of John Steinbeck's story The Moonless Nights.
