= Bach cantatas (Koopman) =

Recording series

Volume 2 of the original release of the Koopman Bach cantatas on Erato, 1995

The Bach cantatas project of Ton Koopman was the first complete recording of all the cantatas, including the 21 secular cantatas. Koopman conducted the Amsterdam Baroque Orchestra & Choir and guest solo singers. The project began in 1995 and was completed in 2005 on 67 CDs.

It was the second recording of the 193 sacred cantatas after the Harnoncourt-Leonhardt Bach cantatas project to use early instruments. Koopman unlike Nikolaus Harnoncourt and Gustav Leonhardt did not use boy choirs, but female sopranos, although Bach would have mainly used boys' voices to perform the soprano lines of his cantatas.

Koopman's project started on Erato Records, but was nearly derailed when Warner — which had acquired the Harnoncourt-Leonhardt Bach cantata recordings when it acquired Teldec from Telefunken in 1988 — also acquired Erato, thus making Koopman's new project a duplication within Warner's catalogue. Koopman was initially confident, and the project continued under Warner ownership, but Koopman's project was one of the first cutbacks when Warner Classics scaled down new recordings across its classical music subsidiaries and wound up Erato entirely in 2002. Warner cancelled the project and proceeded to dump stocks of volumes 1–12 in the discount bins at retailers like HMV and Tower. However Warner allowed Koopman to buy the tapes to 1–12 so he could continue independently. Koopman then founded his own label "Antoine Marchand" (a pun on his own name in French) distributed by Dutch Jazz and classics distributor Challenge Classics.

Koopman's interpretations — which include favouring a choir with four singers per part — were underpinned by his own musicological researches and those of the Bach scholar Christoph Wolff. Vocal soloists for the project include Lisa Larsson, Sandrine Piau, Sibylla Rubens, Barbara Schlick, Caroline Stam, Cornelia Samuelis, Deborah York and Johannette Zomer (soprano), Bogna Bartosz, Michael Chance, Franziska Gottwald, Bernhard Landauer, Elisabeth von Magnus, Annette Markert and Kai Wessel (alto), Paul Agnew, Jörg Dürmüller, James Gilchrist, Christoph Prégardien and Gerd Türk (tenor) and Klaus Mertens (bass).

Koopman also released a video performance of 6 Bach cantatas with the Amsterdam Baroque Orchestra & Choir in 2007.
