= ZwoZwoEins =

German men's choir

- Choir
- Also known as: 221
- Origin: Bad Tölz
- Founded: 2010
- Genre: men's chorus
- Members: 35 (TTBB)
- Music director: Marco Barbon
- Headquarters: Unterföhring near Munich
- Affiliation: Tölzer Knabenchor

ZwoZwoEins (also styled ZWOZWOEINS or 221) is a German male choir ensemble associated with the Tölzer Knabenchor (Tölz Boys' Choir). Established as the choir's men's ensemble in 2010 and composed largely of former members of the boy's choir, it provides tenor and bass singers with the opportunity to continue performing after their voice change. The ensemble has performed independently and together with the Tölzer Knabenchor in Germany and elsewhere in Europe, with repertoire ranging from Renaissance and Romantic music to contemporary works and sacred and folk repertoire.

== History ==
ZwoZwoEins developed from the male voices of the Tölzer Knabenchor, allowing former members of the boys' choir to remain active within the institution after their voices changed. The group had previously performed on a project basis before becoming an independent men's ensemble in 2010 under the direction of Clemens Haudum. Contemporary accounts from the ensemble's early years document performances under the name Männerchor des Tölzer Knabenchores (men's choir of Tölzer Knabenchor), including concerts in Bavaria. In 2014, the ensemble was described as having grown from a project-based group into a permanent formation, while a 2015 account noted that its repertoire had expanded substantially during its first five years. By 2016, the ensemble was participating in larger collaborative projects, including a performance with the Münchner Jugendorchester and the Bayerische Philharmonie.

From 2017 the men's ensemble performed under the name ZwoZwoEins. The name refers to a passage in a motet by Johann Sebastian Bach: In Singet dem Herrn ein neues Lied (BWV 225) bar 221 marks the final section of the eight-part piece, traditionally sung as the finale at major Tölzer Knabenchor concerts.

== Direction ==
Austrian conductor and vocal coach Clemens Haudum led the ensemble's artistic direction until 2024, alongside further conducting responsibilities within the Tölzer Knabenchor. He also arranged several pieces specifically for the choir that are still sung even after his departure. Since then, the ensemble has been directed by the Italian conductor and répétiteur Marco Barbon, who is also working as a conductor and vocal coach with the Tölzer Knabenchor. The choir has four elected speakers that represent the choristers.

== Repertoire ==
The ensemble performs repertoire written or arranged for men's voices, with programmes covering several periods and styles rather than a single historical or stylistic focus. Its programmes have included Renaissance polyphony, Romantic music, sacred works from later periods, contemporary compositions, folk songs and spirituals.

Examples of works performed by the ensemble include Johannes Brahms's Rinaldo, Luigi Cherubini's Requiem, John Henry Maunder's The Martyrs, Felix Mendelssohn Bartholdy's Vespergesang and Carl Loewe's Die Eherne Schlange as well as Charles Gounod's Messe composée pour trois voix d'hommes. Particular emphasis is laid on works by contemporary composers such as Krzysztof Penderecki, Giovanni Bonato, and Galina Grygorjeva. Programmes have also juxtaposed music from different periods.

== Concert activity ==
ZwoZwoEins performs independently in Germany and elsewhere in Europe and also appears in concerts with the Tölzer Knabenchor. Already during its first years the ensemble was giving independent concerts, including regional performances in Reichling, Bavaria as well as Pfaffenhofen an der Ilm. In 2015, the choir made its international debut in St. Veit im Mühlviertel in the Austrian region of Oberösterreich. In 2020, it was one of the first ensembles to perform under the strict COVID-19 regulations then in place presenting among others the programme Die Geister, die ich rief in Wolfratshausen near Munich. In 2023, ZwoZwoEins performed at the Tiroler Barocktage in Götzens, Austria.

In the 2021/22 season, ZwoZwoEins participated as the chorus in a production of Richard Wagner's Tristan und Isolde at the Festspielhaus Füssen, performing with the Kyiv Symphony Orchestra. The production was part of the Musikfestspiele Königswinkel. During the 2023/24 season local media covered the ensemble's unconventional programme Renaissance meets Gospel, in which Renaissance pieces where sung alongside Gospel and spiritual music. The choir was invited to perform its Soul Strings programme at the international Voci d'Europa festival in Sardinia in September 2025.

The ensemble was also involved in the 2025 and 2026 edition of the Gluck Festspiele with its programme Nachthelle that it performed together with Haute-contre Aco Biscevic. In 2026, the ensemble performed as part of celebrations marking the 70th anniversary of the Tölzer Knabenchor. ZwoZwoEins was also invited to take part in Tolosa's International Choral Contest where it will perform its new programme In Paradisum.

The ensemble places a strong emphasis on faithful interpretations of selected compositions alongside vibrant, youthful concert performances with a modern focus and a commitment to contemporary music. The singers benefit from their sound vocal training as former boy soloists. Additionally, the ensemble regularly performs at concerts with the Tölz Boys' Choir across Germany and other European countries. Various CDs of the ensemble's musical programs have been released.

== Relationship with the Tölzer Knabenchor ==
ZwoZwoEins is closely connected to the Tölzer Knabenchor but functions as a distinct ensemble. The Tölzer Knabenchor's own description emphasizes the continuity between its boys' voices and the adult tenor and bass voices of former choir members.
