= Groningse Bachvereniging =

- Semi-professional mixed choir
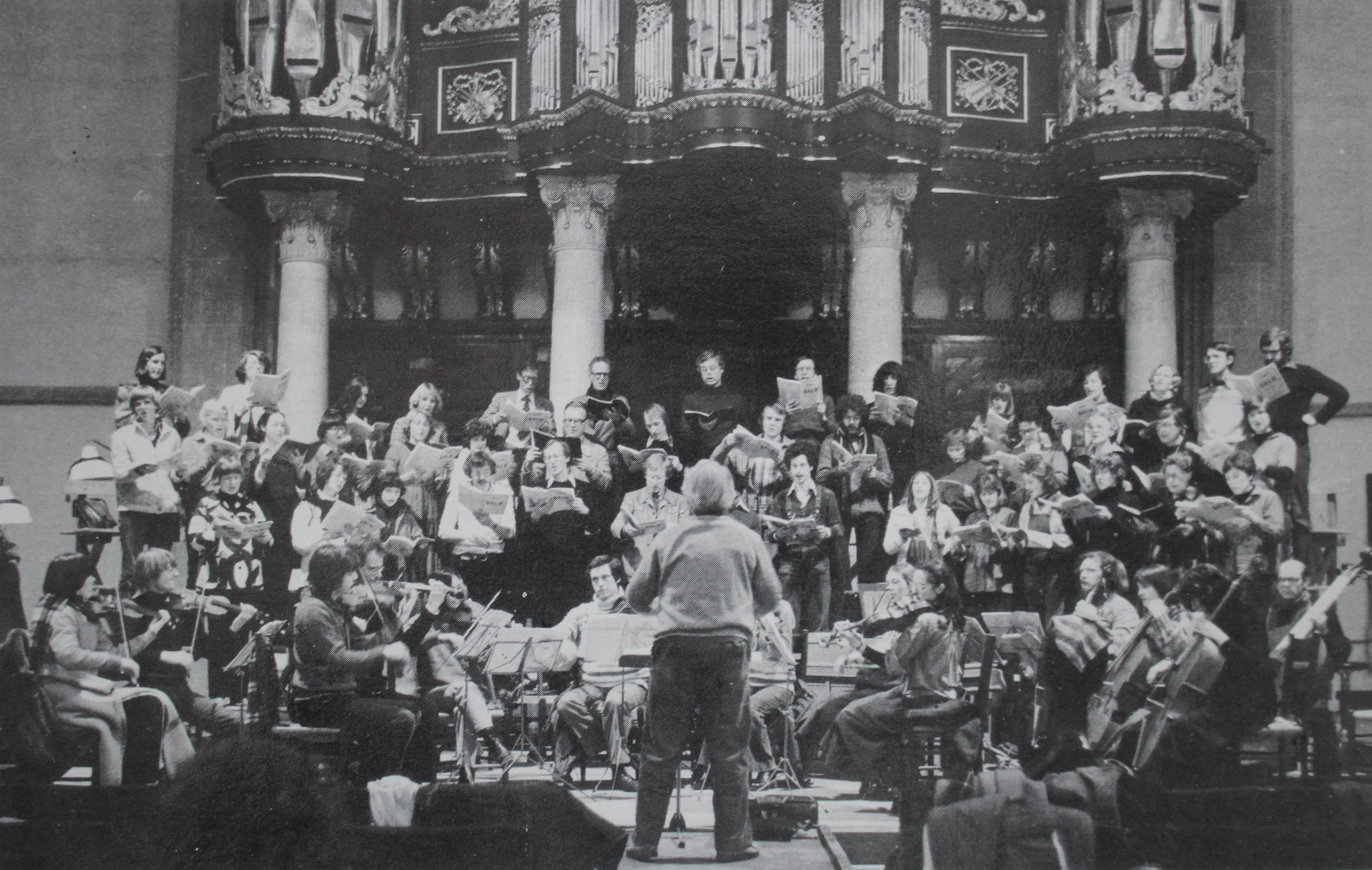
- The choir in 1979
- Origin: Groningen
- Founded: 1945
- Disbanded: 1989
- Genre: historically informed performance
- Chief conductor: Johan van der Meer

The Groningse Bachvereniging was a Dutch semi-professional mixed choir, which existed from 1945 to 1989 and was known for its performances of Baroque music in historically informed performance. It was founded by Johan van der Meer and conducted by him until 1982.

== History ==
Johan van der Meer founded the choir in 1945 on a suggestion by Gerardus van der Leeuw. The choir was formed by amateurs and semi-professional singers. While the great oratorios of Bach were performed by more than 40 singers, only three voices per part sang the six-part St John Passion by Johann Christoph Demantius in 1981.

During the first quarter century, the Groningse Bachvereniging presented music of any style and period from the 15th to the 20th century. However, the works of Bach prevailed. In 1947, Bach's motets were performed not a cappella, but with instrumental accompaniment, in Baroque performance tradition. In 1955, the choir received the culture prize of Groningen province.

The year 1970 was milestone in the choir's history, when van der Meer devoted himself entirely to Baroque music in historical performance. When the regular orchestra Noordelijk Philharmonic Orchestra was not available for a performance of Bach's Magnificat, van der Meer invited Nikolaus Harnoncourt and his Concentus Musicus Wien to the Netherlands for the first time.

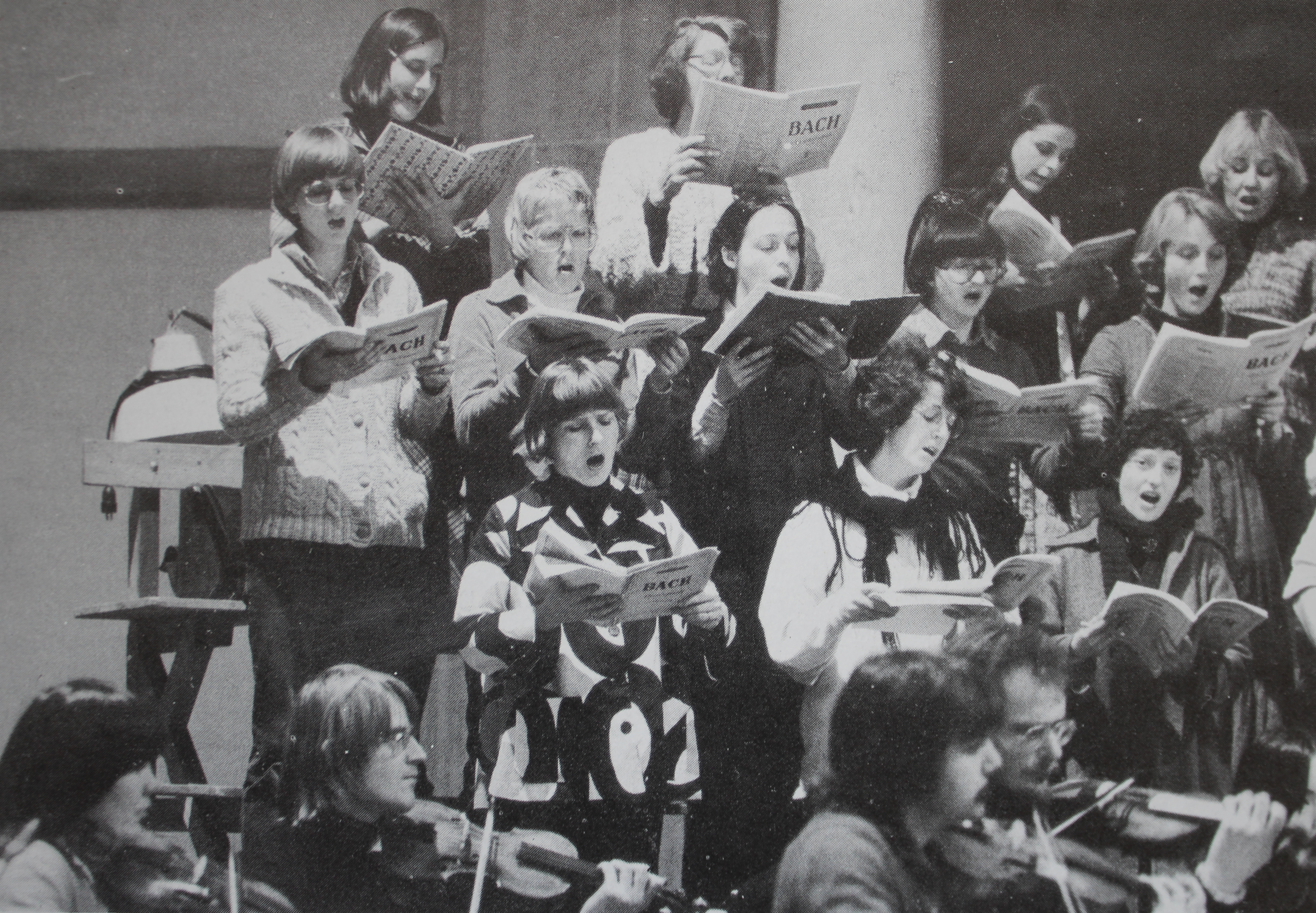
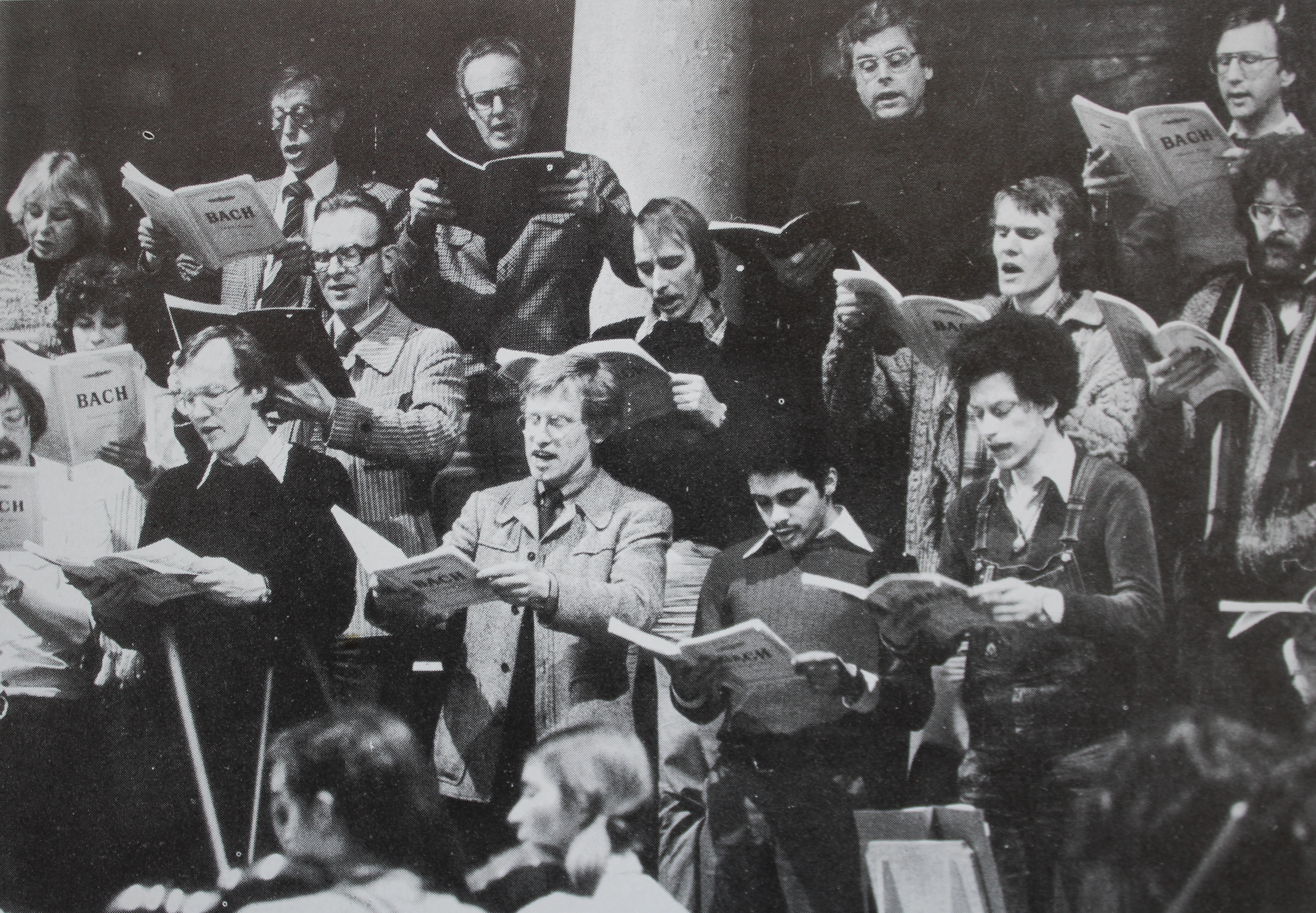
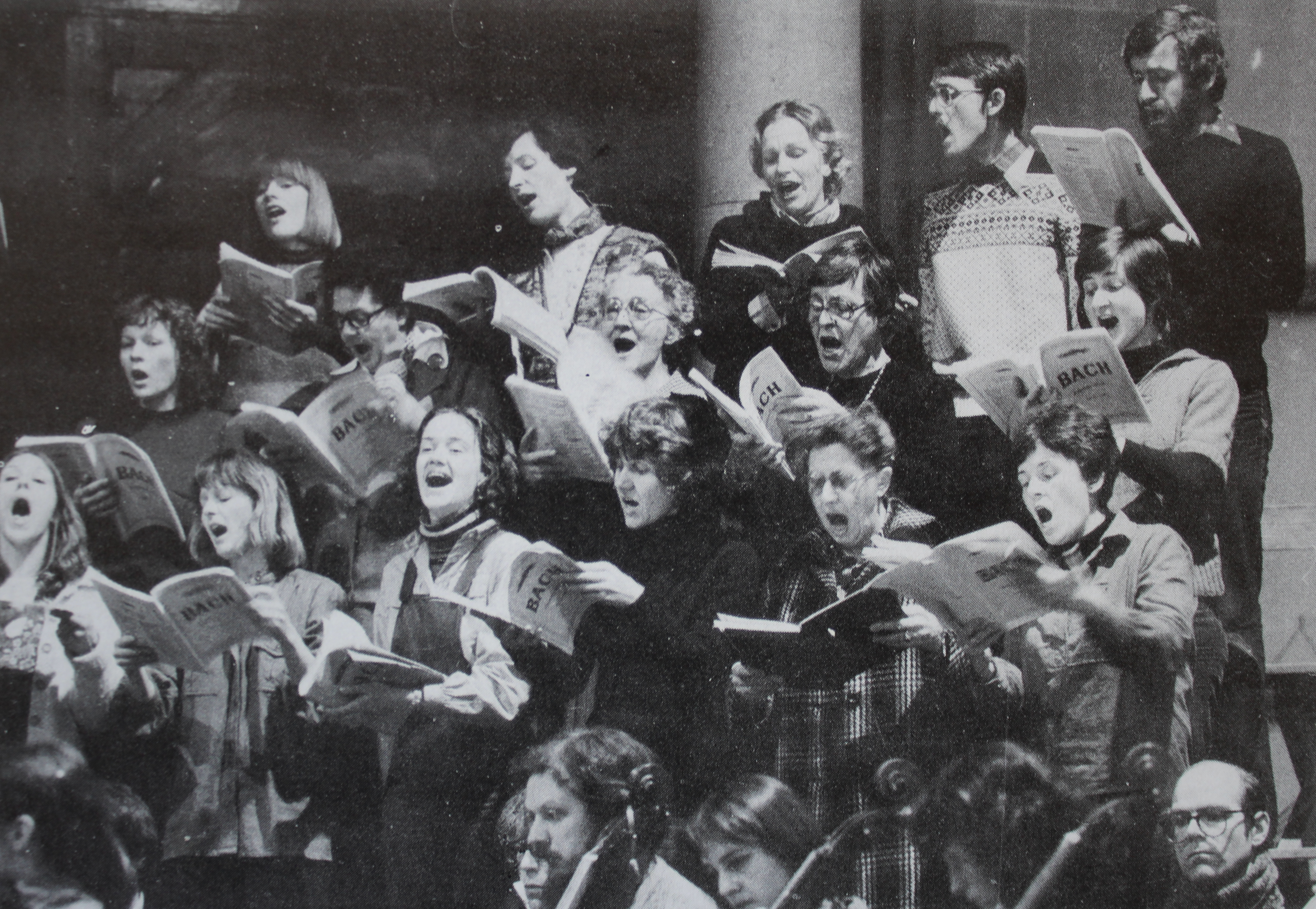
Groningse Bachvereniging in the Martinikerk Groningen, 1979

In 1973, the choir offered the first historically informed performance in the Netherlands of Bach's St Matthew Passion. The Evangelist was Marius van Altena, the vox Christi was Max van Egmond, the other soloists were three boys from the Tölzer Knabenchor, René Jacobs, Harry Geraerts, Michiel ten Houte de Lange, Frits van Erven Dorens and Harry van der Kamp. Ton Koopman and Bob van Asperen played the organs. The performance was recorded live. In 1975, the choir performed and recorded Bach's Mass in B minor at the Holland Festival; the orchestra was La Petite Bande with concert master Sigiswald Kuijken). In 1979, they performed and recorded Bach's St John Passion in Groningen, again with van Altena as the Evangelist and van Egmond as the vox Christi. The choir also performed vocal compositions of Josquin Desprez, Heinrich Schütz, Jan Pieterszoon Sweelinck and George Frideric Handel.

Van der Meer's farewell concert was in 1982, a performance of Handel's Israel in Egypt, with the Fiori Musicali and three trombonists from the Musicalische Compagney. Jos van Veldhoven was appointed as director ad interim. In 1984, Rein de Vries became Van der Meer's successor. In 1989, the Groningse Bachvereniging was dismantled. The choir continued its activities as the Capella Groningen.
