= Johan van der Meer (conductor) =

Dutch choral conductor

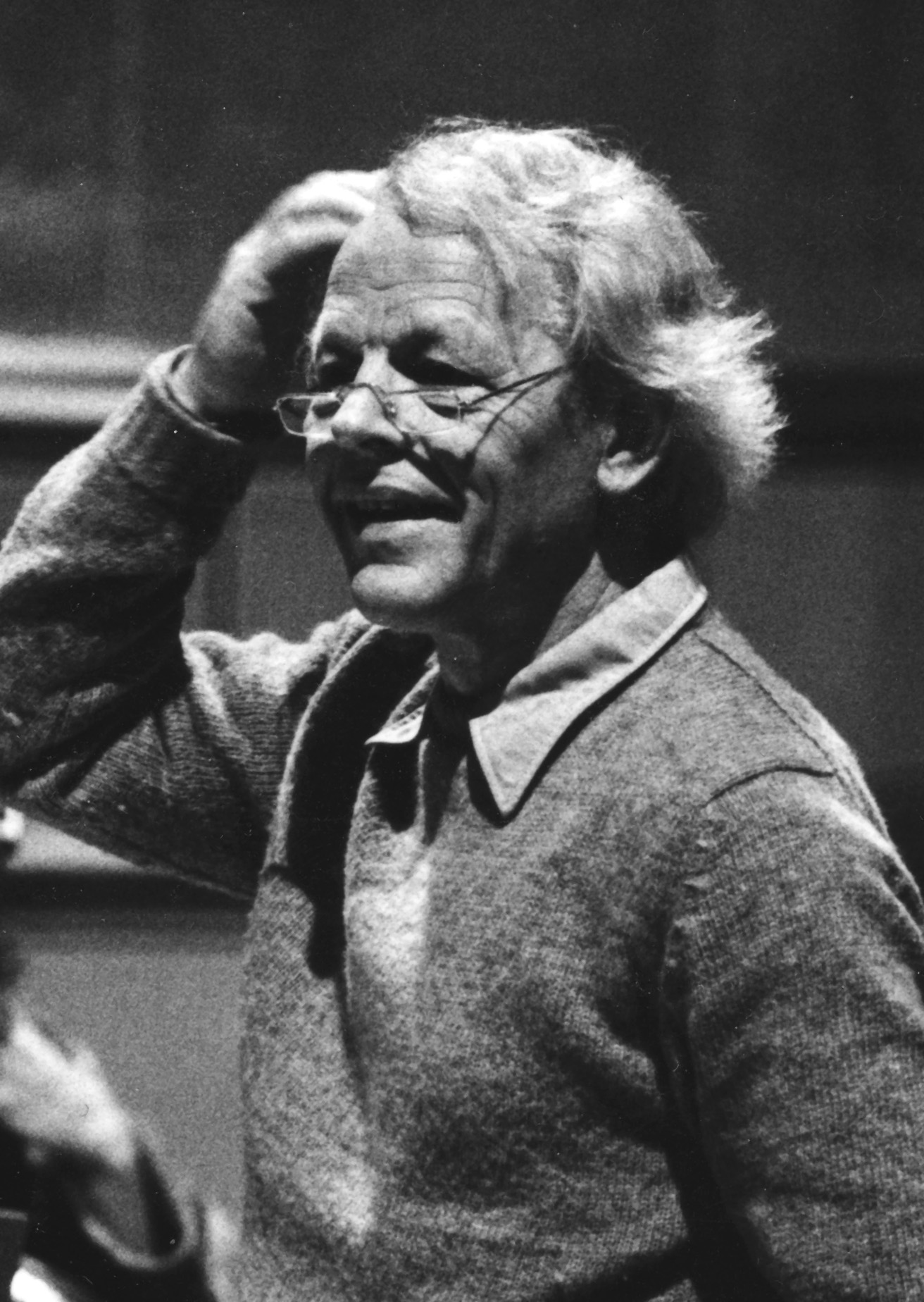
- The conductor in rehearsal, 1980
- Born: 26 November 1913; Noordhorn, Netherlands
- Died: 24 April 2011 (aged 97); Achim, Germany
- Occupation: Choral conductor
- Organization: Groningse Bachvereniging

Johan van der Meer (26 November 1913 – 24 April 2011) was a Dutch choral conductor and pioneer in the field of historically informed performance. He founded the Groningse Bachvereniging.

== Career ==
Van der Meer was born in Noordhorn. In 1945, he founded the semi-professional choir Groningse Bachvereniging and conducted the group until 1984. During the first 25 years they performed music from Renaissance to contemporary, but concentrated on the Baroque era in the early 1970s. Van der Meer introduced Nikolaus Harnoncourt in the Netherlands in 1970. The regular orchestra, the Noordelijk Filharmonisch Orkest, was not available for a performance of Bach's Magnificat, instead van der Meer could work with Harnoncourt's Concentus Musicus Wien.

Van der Meer focused on period instruments, all male voices for the soloists, musical rhetoric and dramatic declamation. In 1973 he conducted the Groningse Bachvereniging in the first historically informed performance in the Netherlands of Bach's St Matthew Passion. The Evangelist was Marius van Altena, the vox Christi was Max van Egmond, the other soloists were three boys of the Tölzer Knabenchor, René Jacobs, Harry Geraerts, Michiel ten Houte de Lange, Frits van Erven Dorens and Harry van der Kamp. Ton Koopman and Bob van Asperen played the organs. The performance was recorded live. The concert was successful and established van der Meer's position in Early Music. In 1974, he conducted Bach's Christmas Oratorio with Musica Antiqua Amsterdam, the first Baroque orchestra of Ton Koopman. In 1975, he conducted and recorded Bach's Mass in B minor at the Holland Festival, the orchestra was La Petite Bande with concert master Sigiswald Kuijken). In 1979 he conducted Bach's St John Passion in Groningen.

He also recorded vocal works by composers such as Heinrich Schütz, Josquin Desprez, Jan Pieterszoon Sweelinck and George Frideric Handel. He died in Achim, Lower Saxony, Germany.

== Literature ==
- Emile Wennekes (2000). "Nachwelt im Nachbarland. Aspekte der Bach-Pflege in den Niederlanden, ca. 1850-2000". Tijdschrift van de Koninklijke Vereniging voor Nederlandse Muziekgeschiedenis (in Dutch). 50 (1/2): 110–130.
