= Bach cantatas (Teldec) =

Album series released by Teldec

The brown cover art used for the first issue on CD

J. S. Bach - Das Kantatenwerk is a classical music recording project initiated by the record label of Telefunken in 1971 (the first recordings had been made in December 1970) to record all 193 sacred Bach cantatas. The project was entrusted to Nikolaus Harnoncourt and Gustav Leonhardt. Each conductor had his own instrumental ensemble, based in Austria and the Netherlands respectively.

The project was the first attempt at a complete recording of the sacred cantatas, but Harnoncourt and Leonhardt were still working on the cantatas when a project which started later, led by Helmuth Rilling, Gächinger Kantorei and Bach-Collegium Stuttgart completed a recording of the sacred cantatas and oratorios on Bach's 300th birthday, 21 March 1985. Since Rilling recorded on modern instruments the Telefunken (then Teldec) project could at least claim, when the project completed in 1990, to be the first recording using historical instruments, with boys' choirs and boy soloists for most soprano and some alto parts. Adult soloists included the tenors Kurt Equiluz and Marius van Altena. An exception to the use of male voices was made for cantatas nos. 51 and 199, which were intended for a female soprano voice.

Harnoncourt conducted his Concentus Musicus Wien with either the Wiener Sängerknaben or the Tölzer Knabenchor. Leonhardt's instrumental ensemble was the Leonhardt-Consort. Leonhardt's usual choirs were the boys of the Tölzer Knabenchor and Knabenchor Hannover (the Netherlands does not have a strong tradition of boy sopranos), and the adult Collegium Vocale Gent, while he featured the choir of King's College, Cambridge in the first volume.

Shortly before the project finished Telefunken sold the Teldec label to Warner in 1988.

== Format ==
The initial releases were LPs. The first CD edition was a direct reissue of the LP edition, where each original 2-LP album was printed on a single or double CD. The collection is available as a boxed set of 60 CDs in the Warner Classics Das Alte Werk series. In 2000 it was included in a complete edition of Bach's works.

== See also ==
- Bach cantatas (Koopman)

Warner was briefly involved with a second cantata set under the direction of the Dutch conductor Ton Koopman. The cycle was started on Warner's subsidiary Erato Records in 1995. Warner withdrew its support from the project, which Koopman continued independently.
