= Friederike Sailer =

German singer (1920–1994)

- Born: Friederike Schneider; 20 February 1920; Regensburg, Germany
- Died: June 1994 (aged 74); Stuttgart, Germany
- Occupation: Operatic soprano
- Organizations: Staatsoper Stuttgart

Friederike Sailer (20 February 1920 – June 1994) was a German soprano in opera and concert. She was a member of the Stuttgart Opera, later a voice teacher at the Musikhochschule Stuttgart. She performed at International festivals and recorded with conductors such as Marcel Couraud.

== Career ==
Born in Regensburg, Sailer initially lived and worked in Ansbach as a kindergarten teacher after her marriage. Her talent at singing was discovered by chance and she began her career singing in operettas in the late 1940s. Her first performances of opera roles were for radio broadcasts by the Nürnberger Studio of the Bayerischer Rundfunk. These performances led to her engagement as a resident artist at the Stuttgart Opera in 1952.

She toured to Paris with the company in 1954 and 1955, performing at the Paris Opera roles such as Marzelline in Beethoven's Fidelio. She took part in the premiere of Werner Egk's Der Revisor in May 1957 at the Schwetzingen Festival, performing the part of Marja. The production, with Fritz Wunderlich in the leading role, was staged by Günther Rennert and conducted by the composer. Sailer performed the part also at the Vienna State Opera, conducted by Michael Gielen. She appeared at the Glyndebourne Festival in 1958 as Gretchen in Albert Lortzing's Der Wildschütz, and at the Salzburg Festival in 1959 as the First Lady in Mozart's Die Zauberflöte. In May 1966 she sang in the premiere of Hermann Reutter's Der Tod des Empedokles, again at the Schwetzingen Festival. She also appeared in several lyric soprano opera roles at the Bavarian State Opera during her career.

Sailer performed regularly in concert, singing Lieder recitals and oratorio, among others. She recorded several Bach cantatas, his Magnificat and Easter Oratorio with Marcel Couraud. She recorded his Mass in B minor with Hans Grischkat, and with Fritz Werner more cantatas and the St John Passion.

Sailer was a voice teacher at the Musikhochschule Stuttgart. She died in Stuttgart.
