= Kurt Equiluz =

Austrian classical tenor (1929–2022)

- Kurt Equiluz, c. 2000
- Born: 13 June 1929; Vienna, Austria
- Died: 20 June 2022 (aged 93)
- Education: Vienna Boys' Choir; Wiener Musikakademie
- Occupation: Classical tenor
- Organizations: Vienna State Opera; Musikhochschule Graz; Wiener Musikakademie
- Title: Kammersänger

Kurt Equiluz (13 June 1929 – 20 June 2022) was an Austrian classical tenor. He was a member of the Vienna State Opera as a tenor buffo from 1957 until 1983, remembered for roles such as Pedrillo in Mozart's Die Entführung aus dem Serail. He appeared regularly at the Salzburg Festival, including world premieres such as Rolf Liebermann's Penelope in 1954. He recorded works by Johann Sebastian Bach with conductors such as Michel Corboz, Helmuth Rilling and Charles de Wolff, and prominently as the Evangelist in the first recording of Bach's St John Passion on period instruments with the Concentus Musicus Wien in 1965, conducted by Nikolaus Harnoncourt.

== Biography ==
Equiluz was born in Vienna on 13 June 1929. He was a member of the Wiener Sängerknaben, performing as an alto soloist. From 1944 to 1950, he studied music theory, harp and singing at the Austrian State Academy for Music and Art in Vienna, singing with Adolf Vogel. He was a member of the Wiener Akademie Kammerchor from 1945.

Equiluz was a member of the chorus of the Wiener Staatsoper from 1950. From 1957, he appeared at the Vienna State Opera as a soloist, with Pedrillo in Mozart's Die Entführung aus dem Serail as his first major role. He remained with the company until 1983, performing 69 different roles of the Spieltenor repertory, such as Jaquino in Beethoven's Fidelio and Scaramuccio in Ariadne auf Naxos by Richard Strauss. He took part in around 2000 performances, also as Monostatos in Mozart's The Magic Flute, Trabuco in Verdi's La forza del destino, Goro in Puccini's Madama Butterfly, Spoletta in Tosca, and Remendado in Bizet's Carmen, working with conductors such as Karl Böhm, Herbert von Karajan and Georg Solti. He regularly appeared at the Salzburg Festival operas and concerts, including the world premieres of Rolf Liebermann's Penelope (1954), Frank Martin's Mystère de la Nativité (1960), and Rudolf Wagner-Régeny's Das Bergwerk zu Falun (1961). He was honoured by the title Kammersänger in 1980.

Equiluz became known for his interpretation of Bach cantatas and oratorios in the historically informed performance recordings of Nikolaus Harnoncourt and Gustav Leonhardt. He sang the Evangelist in both the first recording of Bach's St John Passion on period instruments with the Concentus Musicus Wien in 1965, and Bach's St Matthew Passion in its first recording with period instruments in 1970.

In 1977, he sang the Evangelist in a recording of the St Matthew Passion with the Netherlands Bach Society, conducted by Charles de Wolff, with Max van Egmond as the vox Christi. He recorded the St John Passion, the St Matthew Passion and the Christmas Oratorio also with Michel Corboz He recorded Bach cantatas also with the Gächinger Kantorei and Helmuth Rilling. With Harnoncourt he recorded works by Monteverdi, such as his operas L'Orfeo, Il ritorno d'Ulisse in patria, L'incoronazione di Poppea and the Vespro della Beata Vergine. He recorded sacred music of the classical period with the Wiener Sängerknaben, such as Mozart's Missa solemnis in C minor, K. 139 "Waisenhausmesse", his Coronation Mass, Haydn's Theresienmesse and Schubert's Mass No. 6 in E-flat major, D 950 (1976).

Equiluz started teaching in 1964, was appointed professor of the Musikhochschule of Graz in 1971, and of the Wiener Musikakademie in 1982. He retired in 2000.

Equiluz died on 20 June 2022, aged 93,

== Selected recordings ==
- Bach: Johannes-Passion, BWV 245

Kurt Equiluz (Evangelist), Max van Egmond, treble & alto soloists from the Wiener Sängerknaben, Bert van t'Hoff, Jacques Villisech, Wiener Sängerknaben, Chorus Viennensis, Concentus Musicus Wien, conductor Nikolaus Harnoncourt, Teldec 1965

- Bach: Matthäus-Passion, BWV 244

Kurt Equiluz (Evangelist), Karl Ridderbusch, soprano soloists of the Wiener Sängerknaben, James Bowman, Tom Sutcliffe, Paul Esswood, Nigel Rogers, Michael Schopper, Regensburger Domspatzen, Choir of King's College, Cambridge, Concentus Musicus Wien, Nikolaus Harnoncourt, Teldec 1970 ("Erste Gesamtaufnahme in authentischer Besetzung mit Originalinstrumenten. Aufnahmeort: Wien, Casino Zögernitz, September 1970." – first complete recording in authentic instrumentation with period instruments, Vienna)

- Bach: Weihnachtsoratorium, BWV 248

Kurt Equiluz (Evangelist), Barbara Schlick, Carolyn Watkinson, Michel Brodard, Ensemble Vocal de Lausanne, Orchestre de Chambre de Lausanne, conductor Michel Corboz, Erato 1984

- Monteverdi: Vespro della Beata Vergine

Margaret Marshall, Felicity Palmer, Philip Langridge, Kurt Equiluz, Thomas Hampson, Arthur Korn, Arnold Schoenberg Choir, Tölzer Knabenchor, Wiener Hofburgkapelle, Choralschola, Concentus Musicus Wien, conductor Nikolaus Harnoncourt, Teldec 1986
