= Ach Herr, mich armen Sünder =

Lutheran chorale of 1524, with words by Martin Luther

- Lutheran hymn
- English: Ah Lord, poor sinner that I am
- Text: by Cyriakus Schneegass
- Language: German
- Based on: Psalm 6
- Melody: by Hans Leo Hassler
- Composed: 1601
- Published: 1597

"Ach Herr, mich armen Sünder" ("Ah Lord, poor sinner that I am") is a Lutheran hymn of 1597, with text by Cyriakus Schneegass paraphrasing Psalm 6. It is commonly sung with a 1601 melody by Hans Leo Hassler. Johann Sebastian Bach based a chorale cantata on it.

== History and text ==
Schneegass was pastor of the St. Blasius church at Friedrichroda; he was also a good musician who liked to use music in church services. In 1597 he paraphrased Psalm 6, following the example of Martin Luther to make the psalms accessible to Protestant church services in German.

The hymn is in six stanzas of eight lines each. It became associated with a 1601 melody by Hans Leo Hassler.

Johann Sebastian Bach used the complete hymn as the base for Ach Herr, mich armen Sünder, BWV 135, a chorale cantata composed in 1724.
