= Bert van t'Hoff =

Baroque-Era Dutch Tenor

Bert van t'Hoff is a Dutch tenor who specializes in Baroque music in historically informed performance.

He performed in 1965 the tenor arias in an early recording of Nikolaus Harnoncourt of Bach's St John Passion, with Kurt Equiluz as the Evangelist and Max van Egmond as the vox Christi (voice of Christ).
