= In dir ist Freude =

German hymn

- Christian hymn
- English: "In Thee Is Gladness"
- Text: by Cyriacus Schneegaß
- Language: German
- Melody: by Giovanni Giacomo Gastoldi
- Published: 1594

"In dir ist Freude" (In You Is Joy) is a German hymn with text attributed to Cyriacus Schneegaß, based on a 1591 dance song by Giovanni Giacomo Gastoldi. It was first published in Erfurt in a 1594 collection of Christmas carols. Johann Sebastian Bach composed a chorale prelude BWV 615 on the tune, as part of his Orgelbüchlein. The hymn is included in the widely-used Protestant hymnal Evangelisches Gesangbuch, and in many other hymnals and songbooks, including ecumenical collections. The text was translated by Catherine Winkworth as "In Thee Is Gladness".

== History ==
A lieta vita (MIDI file)

"In dir ist Freude" pairs a sacred, but ebullient, German text with a secular melodyby Giovanni Giacomo Gastoldi first published in 1591 for the Italian dancing song, "A lieta vita amor ci invita" (Amor invites us to a merry life), which may have been intended for performance in costumed entertainments. The resulting hymn, "In dir ist Freude" first appeared in Erfurt in Johann Lindemann's 1594 collection of 20 Christmas carols, re-printed in 1598. While the text was first attributed to Lindemann, it is unclear if he wrote any hymns, and it has since been attributed instead to Cyriacus Schneegaß.

It is contained in the modern Protestant hymnal Evangelisches Gesangbuch as EG 389, and is part of many other hymnals and songbooks, including ecumenical collections.

== Text ==
The text is in two stanzas of 16 short lines. Most lines have five syllables in always the same rhythm. Lines 3, 6, 11 and 16 are longer and rhyme, in an AAB CCB DDEEF GGHHF rhyme scheme. Lines 11 and 16 of each stanza end on "Halleluja".

The text is based on Bible verses including Psalm 30:11–12 and Romans 8:38–39. The singer addresses Jesus as the source of joy in all distress.

The hymn was translated by Catherine Winkworth as "In Thee Is Gladness" for the second edition of her Lyra Germanica (1858). It is part of the Lutheran Service Book, among other modern hymnals.

In dir ist Freude,
in allem Leide,
o du süßer Jesu Christ!
durch dich wir haben
himmlische Gaben,
du der wahre Heiland bist.
Hilfest von Schanden,
rettest von Banden;
wer dir vertrauet,
hat wohl gebauet,
wird ewig bleiben. Halleluja.
Zu deiner Güte
steht unser G'müte.
An dir wir kleben
in Tod und Leben,
nichts kann uns scheiden. Halleluja.

Wenn wir Dich haben,
kann uns nicht schaden
Teufel, Welt, Sünd' oder Tod.
Du hast's in Händen,
kannst alles wenden,
wie nur heißen mag die Noth,
Drum wir Dich ehren,
Dein Lob vermehren
mit hellem Schalle,
freuen uns alle
zu dieser Stunde, Halleluja!
Wir jubiliren
und triumphiren,
rühmen und leben
Dein' Macht dort oben,
mit Herz und Munde, Halleluja!

Translation:

In Thee is gladness
Amid all sadness,
Jesus, sunshine of my heart.
By Thee are given
The gifts of heaven,
Thou the true Redeemer art.
Our souls Thou wakest,
Our bonds Thou breakest;
Who trusts Thee surely
Has built securely;
He stands forever: Alleluia!
Our hearts are pining
To see Thy shining,
Dying or living
To Thee are cleaving;
Naught can us sever: Alleluia!

Since He is ours,
We fear no powers,
Not of earth nor sin nor death.
He sees and blesses
In worst distresses;
He can change them with a breath.
Wherefore the story
Tell of His glory
With hearts and voices;
All heav'n rejoices
In Him forever: Alleluia!
We shout for gladness,
Triumph o'er sadness,
Love Him and praise Him
And still shall raise Him
Glad hymns forever: Alleluia!

== Melody and music ==
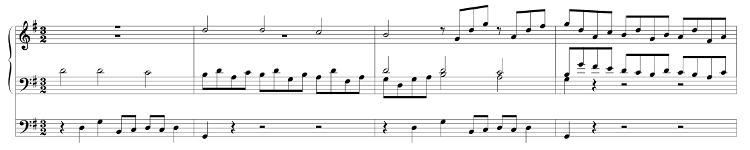
Beginning of Bach's BWV 615

Gastoldi's melody has been described as perfectly matching its expression of joy in the first line with its consolation of trust in Jesus during hard times.

Johann Sebastian Bach composed a festive organ chorale prelude, BWV 615, as part of his Orgelbüchlein dating from his period at Weimar; the complete cantus firmus is gradually heard in canon, over a carillon-like ostinato pedal. The chorale prelude featured in the 2019 CD "Bach to the future" of Olivier Latry, principal organist at Notre-Dame de Paris, recorded shortly before the devastating fire in the cathedral.
