= Max van Egmond =

Dutch bass and baritone singer

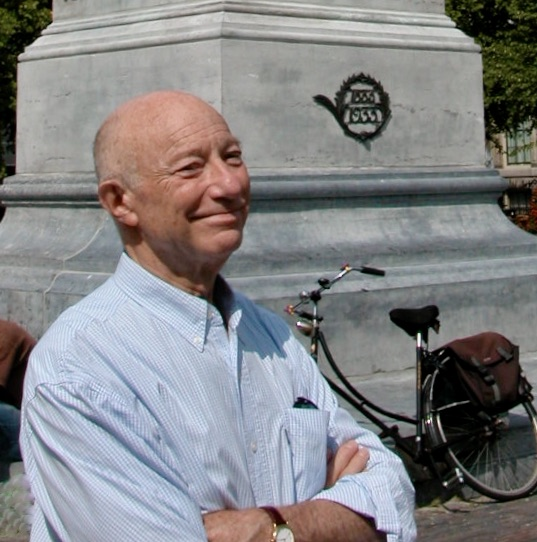
- Max van Egmond in 2006
- Born: 1 February 1936 (age 90); Semarang, Dutch East Indies
- Occupations: Classical bass-baritone singer; Professor
- Organization: Sweelinck Conservatory Amsterdam

Max van Egmond (born 1 February 1936 in Semarang) is a Dutch bass and baritone singer. He has focused on oratorio and Lied and is known for singing works of Johann Sebastian Bach. He was one of the pioneers of historically informed performance of Baroque and Renaissance music.

== Career ==
Max van Egmond studied voice at Hilversum with Tine van Willingen de Lorme. At the age of eighteen he became a member of De Nederlandse Bachvereniging (Netherlands Bach Society).

Starting in 1965, he became involved in the complete Bach recordings of Gustav Leonhardt, Nikolaus Harnoncourt and Frans Brüggen. He recorded the St Matthew Passion under Claudio Abbado in 1969 and Nikolaus Harnoncourt in 1970, singing the bass arias. In 1973, he was the Vox Christi in the first historically informed performance in the Netherlands of Bach's St Matthew Passion. Johan van der Meer conducted the Groningse Bachvereniging, the Evangelist was Marius van Altena, the other soloists were three boys of the Tölzer Knabenchor, René Jacobs, Harry Geraerts, Michiel ten Houte de Lange, Frits van Erven Dorens and Harry van der Kamp. Ton Koopman and Bob van Asperen played the organs. In 1977, he performed the part with Charles de Wolff and De Nederlandse Bachvereniging, in 1989 with Gustav Leonhardt. In the St John Passion he recorded the words of Jesus in 1965 with Harnoncourt and the Concentus Musicus Wien, in 1979 with van der Meer, in 1986 with de Wolff, and in 1987 the arias with Sigiswald Kuijken and La Petite Bande.

He participated in recordings of Monteverdi's operas with Harnoncourt, L'Orfeo in 1968, and the first complete recording of Il ritorno d'Ulisse in patria in 1971. He also performed more recent operas, such as the world premieres at De Nederlandse Opera of Jurriaan Andriessen's Het Zwarte Blondje in 1962 and of Antony Hopkins' Three's Company in 1963.

In 1969 he was the soloist in Reger's Hebbel Requiem in concerts recorded live in the Berliner Philharmonie with Junge Kantorei, Symphonisches Orchester Berlin and conductor Joachim Carlos Martini. In 1976 he performed with the same choir Handel's Messiah in Eberbach Abbey. In 1998 he sang the words of Jesus in Bach's St Matthew Passion in St. Martin, Idstein with Elisabeth Scholl, Andreas Scholl and Max Ciolek as the Evangelist.

Max van Egmond has performed and recorded romantic Lieder of Schubert, Schumann and Fauré, among others, accompanied on period instruments. Songs by Gabriel Fauré were accompanied by Jos van Immerseel on an Erard piano built in 1897. Schubert's Winterreise was accompanied by Penelope Crawford on a fortepiano of Conrad Graf, built in 1835.

He was a teacher at the Sweelinck Conservatory Amsterdam from 1980 until 1995 and conducted master classes, annually in Mateus, Portugal, and at the Baroque Performance Institute at Oberlin, Ohio since 1978. One of his students has been Harry van der Kamp.

== Selected recordings ==
- St Matthew Passion, Peter Schreier, Hermann Prey, Teresa Żylis-Gara, Margarita Lilova, Coro di Voci Bianche dell'Oratorio dell'Immacolata di Bergamo, Orchestra Sinfonica e Coro di Milano della RAI, Claudio Abbado, Dino Classics 1969
- BACH, J.S.: Matthäus-Passion – Kurt Equiluz, Karl Ridderbusch, soprano soloists of the Wiener Sängerknaben, James Bowman, Tom Sutcliff, Paul Esswood, Nigel Rogers, Michael Schopper, Regensburger Domspatzen, Choir of King's College, Cambridge, Concentus Musicus Wien, Nikolaus Harnoncourt, Teldec 1970
- Motetti ed arie a basso solo Monteverdi: Laudate Dominum. Carissimi: O vulnera doloris. Frescobaldi: Maddalena alla croce. Francesca Caccini: O che nuovo stupor. Bassani: Nascere, dive puellule. Cazzati: Factum est praelium magnum. Giovanni Battista Brevi: Catenae terrenae. Maurizio Cazzati: In Calvaria ruppe. Benedetto Marcello: Dal tribunal augusto. Ricercar Consort. Ricercar. 1988.
- Johann Sebastian Bach: cantatas for bass solo Kreuzstab & Ich Habe Genug, Frans Brüggen, Sony 1977 (review by Ehud Shiloni 1998)
- Carl Philipp Emanuel Bach: Die letzten Leiden des Erlösers, Barbara Schlick, Greta De Reyghere, Catherine Patriasz, Christoph Prégardien, La Petite Bande, Collegium Vocale Gent, Sigiswald Kuijken, Sony
- Songs by Gabriel Fauré, Jos van Immerseel, piano, Channel Classics Records 1995
- Franz Schubert: Schwanengesang, Robert Schumann: Dichterliebe, Kenneth Slowik, fortepiano, Musica Omnia 2001
- Schubert: Winterreise, Penelope Crawford, fortepiano, Musica Omnia 2006
- Schubert: Die schöne Müllerin, Penelope Crawford, fortepiano, Musica Omnia 2006
- Bach: Missae breves, Peter Watchorn (organ), Publick Musick, Thomas Folan (conductor), Musica Omnia 2006
