= Leonhardt-Consort =

Leonhardt-Consort, also known as the Leonhardt Baroque Ensemble, was a group of instrumentalists which its director, the keyboard player Gustav Leonhardt founded in 1955 to play baroque music. The Consort was active until around 1990, although some members including Leonhardt himself continued to perform after that date.

The ensemble was based in the Netherlands, although it included people whom Leonhardt knew from Vienna, where he taught at the Academy of Music at the beginning of the 1950s. When it was founded the ensemble consisted of Leonhardt, his wife Marie (a violinist) and other string players. It expanded to include wind players such as Frans Brüggen. From early in the ensemble's history they collaborated with singers such as the counter-tenor Alfred Deller.

The music of Johann Sebastian Bach was central to the work of Leonhardt and his ensemble. In collaboration with the Concentus Musicus Wien, conducted by Nikolaus Harnoncourt, they recorded from 1971 to 1990 a complete set of Bach cantatas in historically informed performances, the Teldec set. The ensemble participated in Bach's St Matthew Passion with the Groningse Bachvereniging, conducted by Johan van der Meer. They recorded all his harpsichord concertos and the Brandenburg Concertos. They also recorded works by William Lawes and Henry Purcell.

== See also ==
- La Petite Bande
