= Cyriakus Schneegass =

German Lutheran pastor, hymn writer, composer and music theorist

Cyriakus Schneegass (German: Schneegaß; Latin: Snegassius, 5 October 1546 – 23 October 1597) was a German Lutheran pastor, hymn writer, composer and music theorist.

== Life ==
Schneegass was born in 1546 in the village of Bufleben, north of Gotha. He came from a peasant family. He attended Handelsschule (trade school) in Gotha and studied at the University of Jena from 1565, mainly with Cyriacus Lindemann.

In 1573 he took his first ministry as the fifth Protestant pastor at St. Blasius Church in Friedrichroda. At the same time he held the post of superintendent of the Weimar adjuncts. He married Dorothea Lindemann, the only daughter of his teacher who had died in 1568. The couple had eight daughters, four of whom are mentioned by name in the preface to his Spiritual songs and hymns, and two sons who died early.

His wife, Dorothea, née Lindemann, was a granddaughter of the Superintendent of Gotha, Friedrich Myconius, and a great niece of Martin Luther.

Schneegass died in Friedrichroda.

== Work ==
A volume in the series of his publications, Briefe hervorragender Männer der Reformationszeit (Schmalkalden 1598) contains correspondence with prominent reformers including Luther and Caspar Cruciger.

In 1595 he published the Weyhenacht- und Neujahrsmotetten von 4 Stimmen (Motets for four parts for Christmas and New Year), published in two volumes in Erfurt, containing his own compositions as well as other composers'.

His most successful release was the release of 73 geistliche Lieder (73 spiritual songs).

Of his hymns, the song "In dir ist Freude in allem Leide" (published in 1598) on a melody by Giovanni Giacomo Gastoldi is in the Protestant hymnal Evangelisches Gesangbuch as EG 398. A familiar Christmas hymn is titled Das neugeborne Kindelein (The newborn little child).

Johann Sebastian Bach wrote in 1724 the fourth chorale cantata of his second annual cycle, Ach Herr, mich armen Sünder, BWV 135, on a hymn by Schneegass. For Christmas of that year, Bach composed a chorale cantata Das neugeborne Kindelein, BWV 122, on a hymn with text and probably also the tune by Schneegass.
