= Moses (Bruch) =

1895 oratorio by Max Bruch

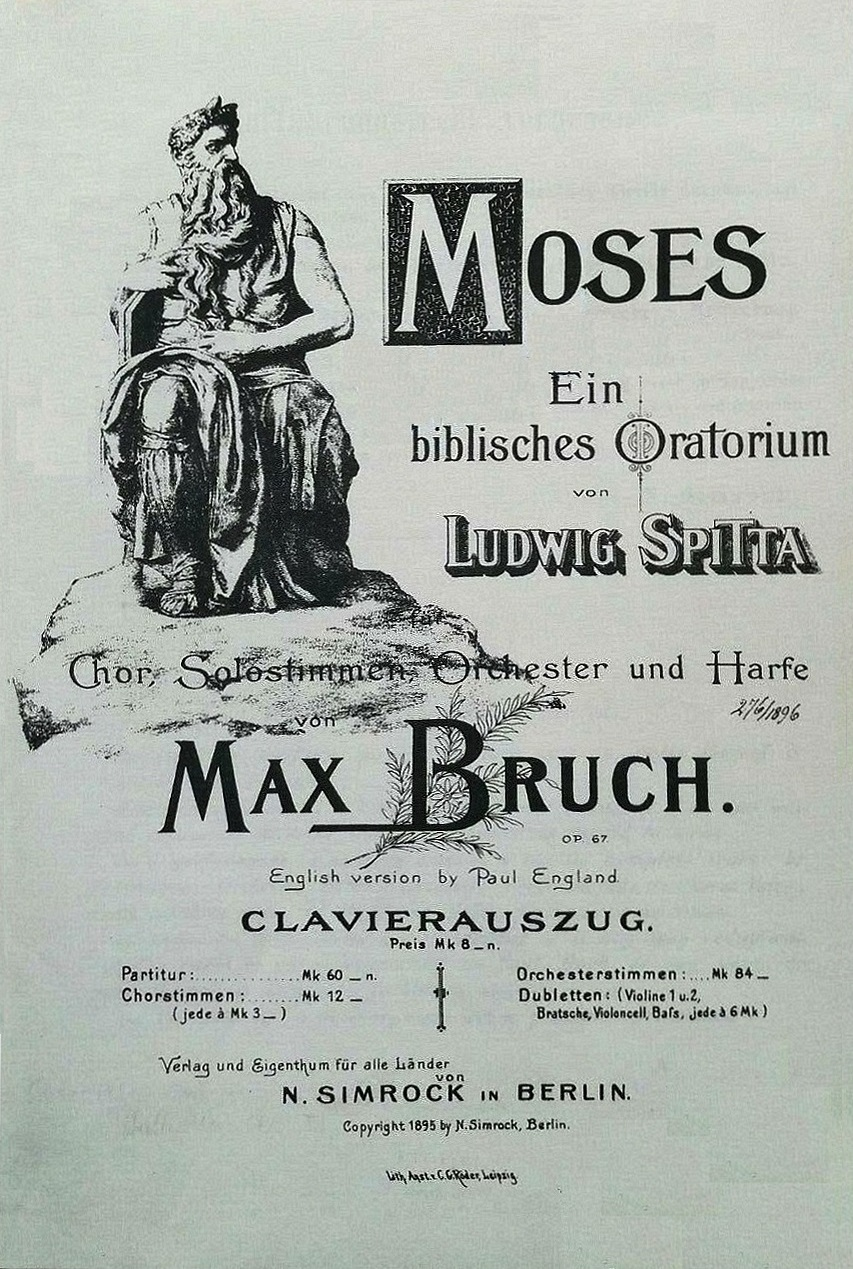
Max Bruch Moses

Moses: ein biblisches Oratorium, Op. 67 is an 1895 oratorio by Max Bruch, on a text by Ludwig Spitta for soprano, tenor, and bass. On 19 January 1895, Moses was premiered in Barmen under Bruch's direction.
