= Cornelia Samuelis =

German classical soprano (born 1972)

Cornelia Samuelis (born 1972) is a German classical soprano who has performed in opera, oratorio, lieder and chamber music both in her native Germany and internationally. Her many recordings as a soprano soloist include Bach's St Matthew Passion conducted by Ton Koopman and the sacred works of Alessandro Melani conducted by Hermann Max.

Samuelis was born in Gernsbach and completed her studies in singing and violin at the Musikhochschule in Detmold in 1996.
