= Boy's voice =

Boy's voice may refer to:

- Boy soprano
- Castrato
- Treble voice

== See also ==
- Boys Voice, a prog rock band featuring Bjørn Ole Rasch
- Boyzvoice, a Norwegian parody pop group
- Voice change, deepening of the voice of people as they reach puberty
