= Kai Wessel (countertenor) =

German opera singer

- Born: 1964 (age 60–61); Hamburg
- Education: Schola Cantorum Basiliensis
- Occupations: Classical countertenor; Academic teacher
- Organization: Hochschule für Musik Köln

Kai Wessel (born 1964 in Hamburg) is a German countertenor and teacher at the Hochschule für Musik Köln.

== Professional career ==
Kai Wessel started singing in school choirs and as a boy soprano at the Christus-Kirche of Hamburg-Wandsbek and received lessons on piano, organ and oboe. He studied to become a composer at the Lübeck Academy of Music but then concentrated on training his countertenor voice with Ute von Garczynski. He studied baroque performance practice at the Schola Cantorum Basiliensis with René Jacobs.

His first concert was in Flensburg in 1984, his first opera appearance 1988 in the theatre of Freiburg im Breisgau. From 1994 to 2004, he was engaged at the theatre of Basel where he sang in productions of Herbert Wernicke in Handel's Theodora, Giulio Cesare and Israel in Egypt, among others. He took part in the project of Ton Koopman to record the complete vocal works of Johann Sebastian Bach with the Amsterdam Baroque Orchestra & Choir. Composers such as Mauricio Kagel, Karola Obermüller, Chaya Czernowin, Heinz Holliger and Klaus Huber wrote works for him. He has been teaching at the Hochschule für Musik und Tanz Köln and Hochschule der Künste Bern.

== Selected recordings ==
- Johann Sebastian Bach: Matthäus-Passion. The Amsterdam Baroque Orchestra/Chorus of De Nederlandse Bachvereniging/ Sacramentskoor Breda, conducted by Ton Koopman. 3 CD, Erato, 1983.
- Marc-Antoine Charpentier: "Motets à double Choeur", H.403, H.404, H.135, H.136, H.137, H.392, H.410, H.167, 1992, Barbara Schlick, Nancy Zijlstra, Klaus Mertens, Dominique Visse, Kai Wessel, Christophe Prégardien, Harry Van Berne, Peter Kooij, The Amsterdam Baroque Orchestra conducted by Ton Koopman. 2 CD Erato 1992
