= Joachim Carlos Martini =

German conductor

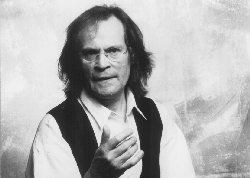
Joachim Carlos Martini

Joachim Carlos Martini (4 May 1931 – 29 November 2015) was a Chilean-born German conductor of music.

He founded the choir Junge Kantorei and the Frankfurt Baroque Orchestra, both of which are known for their performances of Handel's works. Twenty recordings were published under his direction. He also founded an archive dealing with music under Nazism and published a book on the history of Jewish musicians in Frankfurt during the Nazi period.
