= Junge Kantorei =

German choir

Junge Kantorei is a German concert choir established in 1968 by Joachim Carlos Martini. The choir is noted for its performances of George Frideric Handel's works. It is based in Frankfurt and Heidelberg and has released a number of recordings. Among them are the first-time recordings of Handel's pasticci oratorios Gideon, Nabal und Tobit. Since 2014, Jonathan Hofmann is acting as the conductor of the choir.
