= Bob van Asperen =

Dutch harpsichordist, early keyboard instrument performer and conductor

Bob van Asperen (born 8 October 1947, in Amsterdam) is a Dutch harpsichordist, early keyboard instrument performer and conductor. He graduated in 1971 from the Amsterdam Conservatory, where he studied the harpsichord with Gustav Leonhardt and the pipe organ with Albert de Klerk. Since then he has been performing extensively in Europe and the rest of the world as a soloist and accompanist/conductor.

In addition to his live performances, he has recorded repeatedly for several labels, including Sony, EMI, Teldec, Virgin, and Deutsche Harmonia Mundi, specialising in the keyboard repertoire of the 16th - 18th centuries, such as the harpsichord works of Froberger, J. S. Bach, and Handel. One of the most important discography projects he has undertaken is the complete keyboard works of C.P.E. Bach and also the complete sonatas of Catalan composer Antonio Soler (Astrée, 1992). Various other projects are under way, while many of his recordings have been awarded numerous prizes, such as the Preis der Deutschen Schallplattenkritik and the Diapason d'Or.

Bob van Asperen has taught at the Royal Conservatory of The Hague and the Amsterdam Conservatory and for the past thirty years he has given master-classes in Europe, USA and elsewhere. In addition to his teaching activities, he has contributed as a musicologist and editor of several modern editions of works by J. S. Bach and Jan Pieterszoon Sweelinck, as well as other early Dutch composers.
