= Barbara Schlick =

German soprano (born 1943)

Barbara Schlick (born 21 July 1943, Würzburg) is a German soprano who is particularly admired for interpretations of the concert literature of the baroque era.

== Career ==
Schlick studied singing under Henriette Klink-Schneider at the Hochschule für Musik Würzburg and in Essen under Hilde Wesselmann. She later pursued further studies with Rudolf Piernay and Gisela Rohmert. Starting in 1966, Schlick began to appear throughout Europe as a soloist with Adolf Scherbaum's Baroque ensemble. She appeared for the first time in North America in a tour with Paul Kuentz and his chamber orchestra. She has since appeared at major concert halls, performance venues, and music festivals throughout Europe, Israel, Japan, Canada, the United States and Russia, singing under the batons of people like Frans Brüggen, William Christie, Michel Corboz, Reinhard Goebel, Philippe Herreweghe, René Jacobs, Sigiswald Kuijken, and Karl-Friedrich Beringer. She took part in the project of Ton Koopman and the Amsterdam Baroque Orchestra & Choir to record the complete vocal works of Johann Sebastian Bach and also Motets for double chorus by Marc-Antoine Charpentier. Although mostly dedicated to the concert repertoire, she has also performed in baroque operas, notably those of George Frideric Handel, where she has sung Cleopatra in Giulio Cesare as well as the title role of Rodelinda. Schlick has made numerous commercial recordings and appearances on both radio and television.

Schlick taught at the Hochschule für Musik Würzburg for eleven years. She was professor at the Hochschule für Musik Köln since 1997, and worked as guest lecturer at the Maastricht Academy of Music until 2002.

== Sources ==
- Biography at bach-cantatas.com
