= Tölzer Knabenchor =

German boys' choir

- Choir
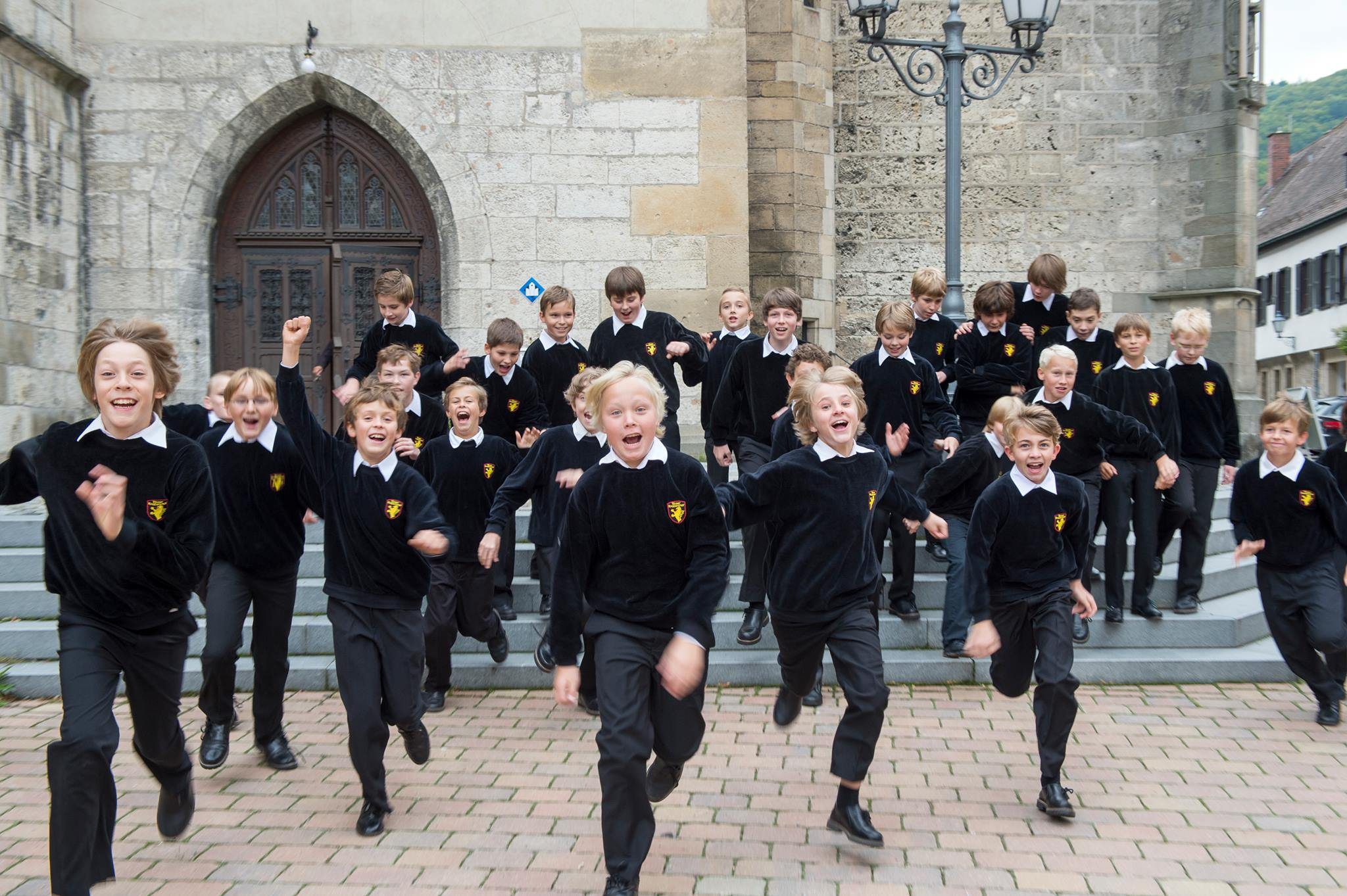
- Origin: Bad Tölz, Bavaria
- Founded: 1956
- Leadership: Christian Fliegner
- Headquarters: Unterföhring near Munich
- Website: www.toelzerknabenchor.de

The Tölzer Knabenchor (Tölz Boys' Choir) is a Boys' choir named after the Upper Bavarian district town of Bad Tölz and based in Unterföhring near Bavaria’s capital Munich. Also associated with the choir is the men's choir ZwoZwoEins, which consists of former members of the choir.

== History ==
In 1956 the then 19-year-old Gerhard Schmidt-Gaden, who was still attending secondary school at the time to complete his A-levels, took over the singing group of a scout group in Bad Tölz. At first, the choir mainly sang folk music. Since a parents' meeting in 1957, it has been called the Tölzer Knabenchor. Schmidt-Gaden, who himself originally aspired to a career as a heldentenor, traced the soloist training of each individual boy back to Johann Sebastian Bach, among other things.

As early as 1956 the choir was invited to give its first radio concerts on Bavarian Radio. The first concert tour to South Tyrol and Trento followed in 1957, followed by a trip to Luxembourg, France, England and Belgium in 1960. From 1963, Carl Orff was a regular guest and conductor. He recorded his school work with the choir.

From the 1960s onwards the choir and its members took part in opera performances. In 1964, for example, soloists from the choir took part in a performance of Mozart's Magic Flute for the first time.

In 1973 Gerhard Schmidt-Gaden and his choir were awarded the German Record Prize for their performance of Johann Sebastian Bach's Christmas Oratorio. Tours to Chicago, China and Japan followed in 1984 and 1986. Since then, the choir has been known worldwide. In Japan, the choirboys are called Angels from Bavaria and are the subject of manga, among other things.

Since then the choir has travelled all over the world, including to Japan, the People's Republic of China, Israel, Poland and the US. It has sung at numerous festivals, including the Bayreuth Festival, Berlin Festival, Bregenz Festival, Handel Festival Halle (Saale), Heinrich Schütz Festival Kassel, Ludwigsburg Palace Festival, Munich Opera Festival, Salzburg Festival, Schleswig-Holstein Music Festival, Schwetzingen Festival and Vienna Festival.

The choir sang at the opening ceremony of the 1972 Summer Olympics in the Olympic Stadium in Munich under the direction of Carl Orff during the traditional greeting of the youth, performed by 3,500 Munich schoolchildren, which made an impression all over the world.

The choir also took part in the official opening ceremony for the 2006 Football World Cup in Germany on 9 June 2006 in the Allianz Arena in Munich under the direction of Christian Stückl. It also sang on the tarmac at Munich Airport to bid farewell to Pope Benedict XVI during his visit to Germany in September 2006, who personally thanked all the boys and the artistic director.

Since 2014 the choir has organised a boys' choir festival in Bad Tölz, at which internationally renowned choirs such as the Vienna Boys' Choir, the Augsburg Cathedral Boys' Choir, the Trinity Boys' Choir, the Zurich Boys' Choir, the Regensburg Cathedral Boys' Choir, the Windsbach Boys' Choir and the Wilten Boys' Choir have performed.

In 2024 the choir, together with the Augsburg Cathedral Boys' Choir, the Regensburg Cathedral Boys' Choir and the Windsbach Boys' Choir, was added to Unesco's Bavarian state list of ‘Intangible Cultural Heritage’. In 2025, the choir distanced itself from American guest conductor Julian Wachner following his arrest for child pornography and cocaine possession. The choir urged parents and choirboys to have no contact with Wachner.

== Repertory ==
The choir or individual singers from the choir take part in almost 150 national and international concerts and opera performances every year, for example at the Salzburg Festival and the Munich Opera Festival.

=== Choir ===
The choir's repertoire includes vocal music from the Middle Ages to modern times, folk songs, madrigals and motets, church music from Baroque to Classical, solo roles and children's choirs for operas.

The choir has sung with numerous renowned orchestras such as the Berlin Philharmonic, Concertgebouw Orchestra Amsterdam, Israel Philharmonic Orchestra, Munich Philharmonic, Orchestra of the Beethovenhalle in Bonn, Sächsische Staatskapelle Dresden and Vienna Philharmonic. His recordings of Bach's cantatas and oratorios with Nikolaus Harnoncourt were a milestone.

The choir has also appeared on numerous television programmes with its popular songs.

=== Soloists ===
The soloists have been engaged on opera stages and concert platforms worldwide for more than four decades. The soloists of the Tölz Boys' Choir are particularly well known for their performances of the ‘Three Boys’ in The Magic Flute in more than 2000 performances since the 1970s.

The soloists are also regular guests at major festivals. Many of the best conductors have worked with the soloists of the Tölz Boys' Choir, including Claudio Abbado, Pierre Boulez, Sergiu Celibidache, Riccardo Chailly, John Eliot Gardiner, Nikolaus Harnoncourt, Bernard Haitink, Lorin Maazel, Seji Ozawa, Christian Thielemann, Daniel Barenboim, Leonard Bernstein, Karl Böhm, Ivor Bolton, Herbert von Karajan, Mariss Jansons, James Levine, Zubin Mehta, Riccardo Muti, Sir Simon Rattle, Wolfgang Sawallisch, Sir Georg Solti and Marcello Viotti.

The opera stage and concert repertoire of the soloists of the Tölz Boys' Choir includes, among others Amore from Claudio Monteverdi's ‘L'Orfeo’, ‘Il ritorno d'Ulisse in patria’ and ‘L'incoronazione di Poppea’, the Three Boys from Wolfgang Amadeus Mozart's ‘The Magic Flute’ as well as Apollo, Hyacinth, Melia and Zephyrus from ‘Apollo and Hyacinth’, Waldvogel from Richard Wagner's ‘Siegfried’ as well as the Shepherd Boy and Four Noble Boys from "Tannhäuser", Yniold from Claude Debussy's ‘Pelléas et Mélisande’, Amore from Christoph Willibald Gluck's ‘Orfeo ed Euridice’, Miles from Benjamin Britten's ‘Turn of the Screw’, 18 boy soloists from Jörg Widmann's ‘Das Gesicht im Spiegel’, Young Joseph from Hans Zender's ‘Chief Joseph’, Leonard Bernstein's ‘Chichester Psalms’, Gabriel Fauré's "Requiem", Gustav Mahler's ‘Das klagendes Lied’ and Felix Mendelssohn Bartholdy's ‘Elijah’.

== Organisation and management ==
Tölzer Knabenchor has been run by Tölzer Knabenchor GmbH since 2009. Previously, the operational tasks were divided between a sponsoring association and a Concert GmbH. The choir's studios have been located in a ZDF building in Unterföhring since 2022. Previously, the Tölzer Knabenchor was based in the youth centre in Bad Tölz from 1956 to 1971 and from 1971 to 2022 successively in premises in the Munich districts of Solln and Obersendling.

=== Artistic direction ===
Christian Fliegner has been the artistic director since 2024. He previously served as artistic director between 2014 and 2021 and as director of vocal training from 2021 to 2024. Ursula Richter heads the soloist department.

Previously, Gerhard Schmidt-Gaden was artistic director from the choir's foundation in 1956 until 2009, after which he worked as an artistic mentor in the choir until 2016. He was succeeded as artistic director from 2009 to 2014 by Ralf Ludewig, who was also managing director. After a dispute and differences of opinion, which were reported in the press, Schmidt-Gaden dismissed his successor Ludewig again. Ludewig subsequently founded the Munich Boys' Choir.

From 2014 to 2021, the vocal pedagogues and long-time employees Christian Fliegner and Clemens Haudum took over the artistic direction as "dual leadership". Haudum stepped down from his position in 2021.[20] In the same year, Michael Hofstetter succeeded him as sole artistic director again. In the summer of 2022, Hofstetter left the choir again with a term of office of less than a year, but remained principal guest conductor and advisory board member of the Friends' Association.

=== Management ===
Since 2016, the choir has been led by managing director Barbara Schmidt-Gaden, who is a singer herself and has previously been the choir's artistic and operational coordinator since 2014. She is the daughter of choir founder Gerhard Schmidt-Gaden. Her mother Helga Schmidt-Gaden was previously responsible for the economic affairs of the choir for many years as managing director and is still an authorised signatory. The head of administration and also an authorised signatory is Marion Vogel. In the choir office, the performances of the choir and soloists are organised by the cultural managers Michael Kocyan and Sara Waegner. In 2016, the media reported on the dismissal of the then choir manager Anselm Sibig, who had built up the male choir of the Tölz Boys' Choir together with Clemens Haudum.

=== Sponsoring association ===
The Tölz Boys' Choir's sponsorship association was founded in 1992. Since 2018, it has been chaired by the former Bavarian Minister of Science Thomas Goppel.

== Talent development and education in the choir ==
The entire choir consists of around 170 boys, who are trained in five individual choirs. A team of eleven choirmasters and singing teachers look after the children. Unlike many other boys' choirs, such as the Thomanerchor or the Vienna Boys' Choir, the children do not live in a boarding school, but with their families.

=== Talent Promotion ===
The educational focus is on musical and vocal training, coupled with the personal development of the boys. The overarching goals are teamwork, self-discipline, self-confidence and independence, as well as arousing enthusiasm and passion for music.

The children receive individual support in choir and solo lessons. Choir rehearsals take place twice a week. Each choir member also receives regular solo lessons. The training principle in the choir ensures that every child is also able to sing as a soloist.

At the beginning of the career in the Tölz Boys' Choir is the admission to Choir 5. For this, the voice coaches look for talented singers in around 80 primary schools in and around Munich at the beginning of the school year. After this, the choir members pass through five choir levels. Progression to the next choir level is linked to the achievement of certain goals and an examination.

=== Training levels ===
Choir 5: The boys acquire basic musical knowledge. Individual voice training and choir work are added in the 2nd semester.

Choir 4: In the second year of primary school, knowledge (including reading music) is deepened.

Choir 3: At the age of around 8, polyphonic music is also learnt and rehearsal weekends are added.

Choir 2: In the so-called repertoire choir, European folk and Christmas songs and classical works by Mendelssohn-Bartholdy, Rossini, Orff and Johann Sebastian Bach are rehearsed. Some boys may start to take part in small concert tours.

Choir 1: The young singers can join the concert choir at around the age of ten.

=== Men's ensemble ZwoZwoEins ===
After the voice change, singers from the choir can remain associated with the choir as tenor and bass voices. In 2010, the male choir of the Tölzer Knabenchor, which performs under the name ZwoZwoEins, emerged from a group of male voices that had previously performed on a project basis. The three numbers are a reminiscence of Bach's eight-part masterpiece "Singet dem Herrn" (BWV 225), the last section of which – beginning at bar 221 – often served as the concert finale.

The repertoire of ZwoZwoEins – Das Männerensemble des Tölzer Knabenchores includes literature for male choir from the Romantic, modern and 21st centuries, such as Johannes Brahms' "Singet dem Herrn", Johannes Brahms' cantata Rinaldo, Luigi Cherubini's Requiem, John Henry Maunder's The Martyrs, Felix Mendelssohn Bartholdy's Vespergesang and Carl Loewe's Eherne Schlange.

From its foundation until summer 2024, the ensemble was directed by Clemens Haudum. Since then, Marco Barbon has been responsible for the musical portfolio of the male ensemble.

== Discography ==
1. Mozart: Requiem in D minor, K. 626 (Chorus) with Bruno Weil (conductor) and Tafelmusik Baroque Orchestra; 2000 (Sony Classical)
