= Ton Koopman =

Dutch conductor and harpsichordist (born 1944)

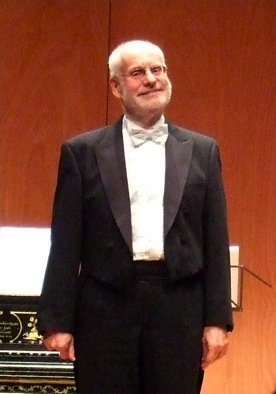
- Ton Koopman
- Born: 2 October 1944 (age 82); Zwolle, Netherlands
- Occupations: Conductor; harpsichordist; musicologist; academic teacher
- Organizations: Amsterdam Baroque Orchestra & Choir

Antonius Gerhardus Michael "Ton" Koopman (Dutch: [tɔŋ ˈkoːpmɑn]; born 2 October 1944) is a Dutch conductor, organist, harpsichordist, and musicologist, primarily known for being the founder and director of the Amsterdam Baroque Orchestra & Choir.

He is a professor in the Royal Conservatory of The Hague and the University of Leiden. In April 2003 he was knighted in the Netherlands and received the Order of the Netherlands Lion.

== Biography ==
Koopman had a "classical education" and then studied the organ (with Simon C. Jansen), harpsichord (with Gustav Leonhardt), and musicology at the Amsterdam conservatory. He specialized in Baroque music and received the Prix d'Excellence for both organ and harpsichord.

He used to play Organ with his toes on the pedalboard. This is an authentic Baroque practice.

Koopman founded the Amsterdam Baroque Orchestra in 1979 and the Amsterdam Baroque Choir in 1992 – now combined as the Amsterdam Baroque Orchestra & Choir – and was Founder Director of the Portland Baroque Orchestra in 1984. Koopman concentrates on Baroque music, especially that of Bach and is a leading figure in the "authentic performance" movement. While a number of early-music conductors have ventured into newer music, Koopman has not. He has said, "I draw the line at Mozart's death" (1791). One exception is his recording of the Concert Champêtre of Francis Poulenc, written in 1928.

=== Bach cantatas project ===
Among Koopman's most ambitious projects was the recording of the complete cycle of all of Bach's cantatas, a project completed in 2005. This project had started while Koopman was an artist of the French Erato Classics label. However, after 12 volumes (36 CDs) the project was stalled when owner Warner Classics wound up its French subsidiary in 2002. Koopman was able to buy back rights for the first 12 volumes and continue the series in 2003 with his own label Antoine Marchand, distributed by Challenge Classics. "Antoine Marchand" is a French translation of his own name.

Soloists for the project were among others Lisa Larsson, Cornelia Samuelis, Sandrine Piau, Sibylla Rubens, Barbara Schlick, Caroline Stam, Deborah York and Johannette Zomer (soprano), Bogna Bartosz, Michael Chance, Franziska Gottwald, Bernhard Landauer, Elisabeth von Magnus, Annette Markert and Kai Wessel (alto), Paul Agnew, Jörg Dürmüller, James Gilchrist, Christoph Prégardien and Gerd Türk (tenor) and Klaus Mertens (bass).

=== Buxtehude project ===
In addition to the works of Bach, Koopman has long been an advocate of the music of Bach's teacher and predecessor, Dieterich Buxtehude. He had previously recorded the keyboard works for Philips Classics and several cantatas for Erato. He was elected president of the "International Dieterich Buxtehude Society" in 2004. Following the completion of the Bach cantatas project Koopman then embarked on a recording of the complete works of Buxtehude. In 2005 he commenced Dieterich Buxtehude – Opera Omnia, a project to record the complete works of Dieterich Buxtehude, which he finished in October 2014.

=== Other projects ===
Besides his work with the Amsterdam Baroque Orchestra & Choir, he is in frequent demand as guest conductor and as harpsichordist and organist. In 2011, Koopman began a three-year stint as artist-in-residence with the Cleveland Orchestra.

His aim is always to achieve authenticity in performance, using historical instruments from the time of the composer, and/or exact copies of them, often using historic musical temperaments, and adopting the performing style of the composers or their contemporaries. The scholar (and fellow keyboardist/conductor) John Butt has criticised Koopman's interpretation of Bach's Goldberg Variations for its overuse of ornamentation, which he attributes to a desire to differentiate his interpretation from those of Gustav Leonhardt.

== Awards and honours ==
In 2003 he was made a Knight in the Order of the Netherlands Lion. In January 2024 he was awarded the medallion of honour from the mayor of the city where he was born, Zwolle.

== Personal life ==
Koopman is married to Tini Mathot, who is also a harpsichordist and fortepianist. Mathot is also his chief recording producer, as well as a teacher at the Royal Conservatory. On 11 October 2012 the documentary Live to be a hundred – a year in the life of Ton Koopman was released in Dutch cinemas.

== Discography ==
Koopman's extensive discography includes the complete Bach cantatas and organ works, St Matthew Passion (twice) and St John Passion, Mass in B minor, Christmas Oratorio, a recording of his own reconstruction of the lost St Mark Passion, concertos and harpsichord works by Bach, Sweelinck's complete keyboard works, the complete works of Buxtehude, Haydn's complete harpsichord concertos, Mozart's Coronation Mass, Vespers and Requiem, a cycle of Mozart and Haydn symphonies, Mozart's early keyboard works K. 1a-5 and Mozart's 3 Harpsichord Concertos after J.C. Bach, K. 107. He conducts 8 soloists, Nancy Zijlstra, Barbara Schlick, soprano, Klaus Mertens, Peter Kooij, bass, Dominique Visse, Kai Wessel, countertenor, Christoph Prégardien, Harry Van Berne, tenor and The Amsterdam Baroque Orchestra for « Les Motets à double Chœur » H.403, H.404, H.135, H.136, H.137, H.392, H.410, H.167 by Marc-Antoine Charpentier, (2 CD Erato 1992), Vivaldi's The Four Seasons, Handel's Messiah and Organ Concertos. Koopman has received many prizes for his recordings.
