= Was Gott tut, das ist wohlgetan, BWV 98 =

Church cantata by Johann Sebastian Bach

Was Gott tut, das ist wohlgetan
- BWV 98
- Church cantata by J. S. Bach
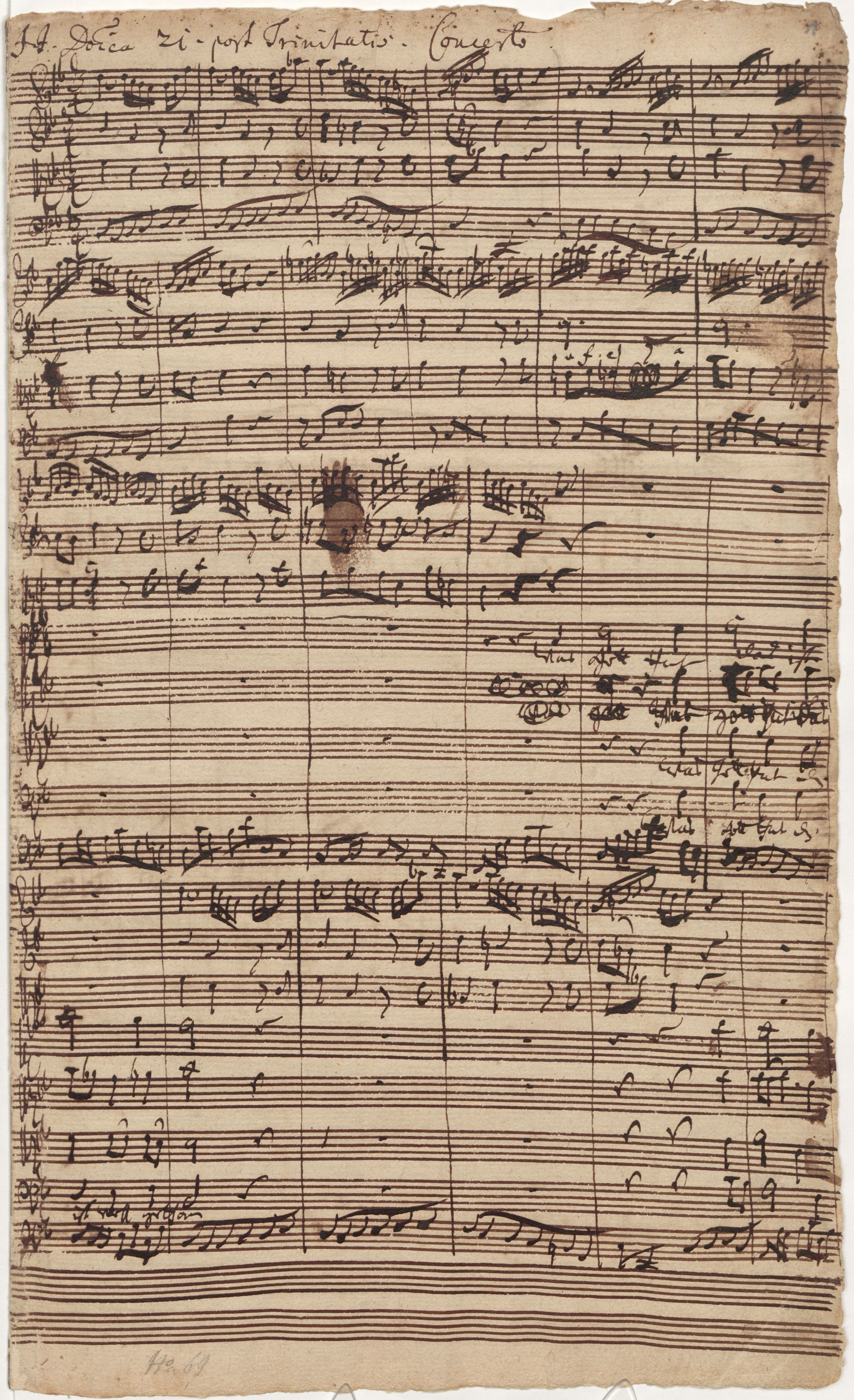
- Autograph manuscript of the first movement of the cantata
- Occasion: 21st Sunday after Trinity
- Cantata text: Christoph Birkmann
- Chorale: "Was Gott tut, das ist wohlgetan"
- Performed: 10 November 1726: Leipzig
- Movements: 5
- Vocal: SATB choir and solo
- Instrumental: 2 oboes; taille; 2 violins; viola; continuo

Johann Sebastian Bach composed the church cantata Was Gott tut, das ist wohlgetan (What God does is well done), BWV 98, in Leipzig for the 21st Sunday after Trinity and first performed it on 10 November 1726.

Bach composed the cantata in his fourth year as Thomaskantor (director of church music) in Leipzig. It is structured in five movements, beginning with a choral movement, unusually followed by two pairs of recitative and aria, without a closing chorale. The cantata is scored for soprano, alto, tenor and bass vocal soloists, a four-part choir, and a small Baroque instrumental ensemble of three oboes, strings and basso continuo. The oboes only reinforce the voices. The opening chorus sets the first stanza of Samuel Rodigast's hymn "Was Gott tut, das ist wohlgetan", published in 1674. The text for the other movements is by Christoph Birkmann, who focused on trust in God, alluding to the Bible in several ways. The final movement begins like the usual chorale, quoting a line from Christian Keymann's "Meinen Jesum laß ich nicht", but it continues in independent poetry and music.

== History and words ==
In his fourth year in Leipzig, Bach wrote the cantata for the 21st Sunday after Trinity. The prescribed readings for the Sunday were from Paul's Epistle to the Ephesians, "take unto you the whole armour of God" (Ephesians 6:10–17), and from the Gospel of John: the healing of the nobleman's son (John 4:46–54). The cantata opens with the first stanza of the chorale "Was Gott tut, das ist wohlgetan" (1674) by Samuel Rodigast, but it is not a chorale cantata in the strict sense of Bach's second cantata cycle, cantatas on the stanzas of one chorale. He had then treated the same chorale completely in Was Gott tut, das ist wohlgetan, BWV 99 (1724), and would do it later once more in Was Gott tut, das ist wohlgetan, BWV 100 (1734).

The text of the chorale concentrates on trust in God, whereas the two cantatas previously composed for the occasion, Ich glaube, lieber Herr, hilf meinem Unglauben, BWV 109, and Aus tiefer Not schrei ich zu dir, BWV 38, both started from doubt and distress. The poet Christoph Birkmann, a student in Leipzig from 1724 to 1727 who collaborated with Bach, referred to general ideas from the gospel. In the fourth movement he stressed that a prayer for salvation will be granted according to Matthew 7:7, "knock, and it shall be opened unto you"; in the fifth movement, he paraphrased Jacob in Genesis 32:26, "I will not let you go, except you bless me". This final movement is not a chorale, although its text begins like one, Christian Keymann's "Meinen Jesum laß ich nicht" (1658). Birkmann's text was published in 1728 in the cantata collection Gottgeheiligtes Sabbaths-Zehnden.

Bach first performed the cantata on 10 November 1726. It is regarded as part of his third cantata cycle.

== Music ==
=== Structure and scoring ===
Bach structured the cantata in five movements, a chorale movement and two pairs of recitative and aria. He scored it intimately for four vocal soloists (soprano (S), alto (A), tenor (T), and bass (B)), a four-part choir, and a Baroque instrumental ensemble of two oboes (Ob), taille (Ta, a tenor oboe), two violins (Vl), viola (Va), and basso continuo.

In the following table, the scoring is based on the Neue Bach-Ausgabe. The keys and time signatures are taken from Dürr, using the symbols for common time (4/4) and alla breve (2/2). The continuo, played throughout, is not listed.

Movements of Was Gott tut, das ist wohlgetan
| No. | Title | Text | Type | Vocal | Winds | Strings | Key | Time |
|---|---|---|---|---|---|---|---|---|
| 1 | Was Gott tut, das ist wohlgetan | Rodigast | Chorus | SATB | 2Ob Ot | 2Vl Va | B-flat major | 3/4 |
| 2 | Ach Gott! wenn wirst du mich einmal | Birkmann | Recitative | T | | | | common time |
| 3 | Hört, ihr Augen, auf zu weinen | Birkmann | Aria | S | Ob | | C minor | 3/8 |
| 4 | Gott hat ein Herz, das des Erbarmens Überfluß | Birkmann | Recitative | A | | | | common time |
| 5 | Meinen Jesum laß ich nicht | Birkmann | Aria | B | | 2Vl Va | B-flat major | cut time |

=== Movements ===
==== 1 ====
The cantata is scored like chamber music, especially compared to the chorale cantatas on the same chorale with a melody by Severus Gastorius. In the opening chorus, the voices are mostly homophonic, with the oboes playing colla parte. The strings play a ritonello as an introduction and between the chorale lines, which is dominated by the first violin, as an obbligato instrument rather than an independent orchestral concerto. The final line is in free polyphony which continues even during the long last note of the tune. All voices have extended melismas on the word "walten" (govern), stressing that God is "ultimately in control". Strings and voices alternate in the bar form's two Stollen, but are united for the Abgesang.

==== 2 ====
In a secco recitative, "Ach Gott! wenn wirst du mich einmal von meiner Leidensqual … befreien?" (O God, when will the time once be, when I from agony … be rescued?) begins in a "tone of reproach", expressed in large intervals and chromatic dissonant sounds, and moves to faith in God.

==== 3 ====
In the first aria, "Hört, ihr Augen, auf zu weinen" (Cease now, eyes, from all your weeping) is accompanied by an obbligato oboe. The first two measures of its theme are derived from the chorale tune. The ritornello is repeated after two different vocal sections; in the first, the weeping is expressed in a minor key, with sigh motifs and chromaticism, while the second section announces "Gott der Vater lebet noch" (God the Father lives today) in a major key. Bach embellished the word "lebet" in a stream of triplets in the voice.

==== 4 ====
The secco recitative for alto, "Gott hat ein Herz, das des Erbarmens Überfluss" (God has a heart that always is compassionate), brings the central point of the cantata, quoting from the Sermon on the Mount.

==== 5 ====
The second aria is the final movement, dominated by the violins in unison in a similar structure as the first, two vocal sections framed by repeats of a ritornello. The subject was compared to a Gavotte and is present throughout the aria, "lending it a joyous, carefree character", as Karin Wollschläger writes in the preface of the Carus critical edition.

Bach hinted at the regular closing chorale by beginning the vocal part with an embellished version of the first line of the hymn "Meinen Jesum laß ich nicht", sung to a melody by Andreas Hammerschmidt. This first line appears in four of five entries of the voice. After the first line, the voice continues independently, in the "optimistic spirit of the opening".

== Manuscripts and publication ==
The manuscripts of both the score and a set of 15 parts are extant.

The first critical edition of the cantata, edited by Wilhelm Rust, was published by the Bach Gesellschaft in 1868 as part of its complete edition of Bach's works. In the Neue Bach-Ausgabe, the second edition of Bach's works, the cantata was published in 1997, edited by Ulrich Bartels.

Carus published a critical edition in German and English as part of its Stuttgarter Bach-Ausgaben in 2017, edited by Wollschläger. In the 21st century, Bach Digital published high-resolution facsimile images of the manuscript parts from the first quarter of the 18th century.

== Recordings ==
The selection is taken from the listing provided by the Bach Cantatas Website. In the following table, ensembles playing on period instruments in historically informed performance are marked by a green background under the header Instr..

Recordings of Was Gott tut, das ist wohlgetan
| Title | Conductor / Choir / Orchestra | Soloists | Label | Year | Instr. |
|---|---|---|---|---|---|
| Les Grandes Cantates de J. S. Bach Vol. 14 | Fritz Werner Heinrich-Schütz-Chor Heilbronn Pforzheim Chamber Orchestra | Agnes Giebel; Claudia Hellmann; Helmut Krebs; Erich Wenk | Erato | 1963 | |
| J. S. Bach: Das Kantatenwerk Vol. 5 | Gustav Leonhardt Knabenchor Hannover Leonhardt-Consort | soloist of the Knabenchor Hannover; Paul Esswood; Kurt Equiluz; Max van Egmond | Teldec | 1979 | Period |
| Die Bach Kantate Vol. 55 | Helmuth Rilling Gächinger Kantorei Bach-Collegium Stuttgart | Arleen Augér; Julia Hamari; Lutz-Michael Harder; Walter Heldwein | Hänssler | 1983 | |
| Bach Edition Vol. 5 – Cantatas Vol. 2 | Pieter Jan Leusink Netherlands Bach Collegium | Ruth Holton; Sytse Buwalda; Knut Schoch; Bas Ramselaar | Brilliant Classics | 1999 | Period |
| Bach Cantatas Vol. 11: Genova/Greenwich | John Eliot Gardiner Monteverdi Choir English Baroque Soloists | Joanne Lunn; William Towers; Paul Agnew; Gotthold Schwarz | Soli Deo Gloria | 2000 | Period |
| J. S. Bach: Complete Cantatas Vol. 18 | Ton Koopman Amsterdam Baroque Orchestra | Johannette Zomer; Bogna Bartosz; Christoph Prégardien; Klaus Mertens | Antoine Marchand | 2003 | Period |
| J. S. Bach: Cantatas for the Complete Liturgical Year Vol. 1: "Ich will den Kreuzstab gerne tragen" - Cantatas BWV 98 · 180 · 56 · 55 | Sigiswald Kuijken La Petite Bande | Sophie Karthäuser; Petra Noskaiová; Christoph Genz; Dominik Wörner | Accent Records | 2004 | Period |
| J. S. Bach: Cantatas Vol. 48 – Cantatas from Leipzig 1723 | Masaaki Suzuki Bach Collegium Japan | Hana Blažíková; Robin Blaze; Satoshi Mizukoshi; Peter Kooy | BIS | 2010 | Period |
