= Weinen, Klagen, Sorgen, Zagen, BWV 12 =

Church cantata by Johann Sebastian Bach

Weinen, Klagen, Sorgen, Zagen
- BWV 12
- Church cantata by J. S. Bach
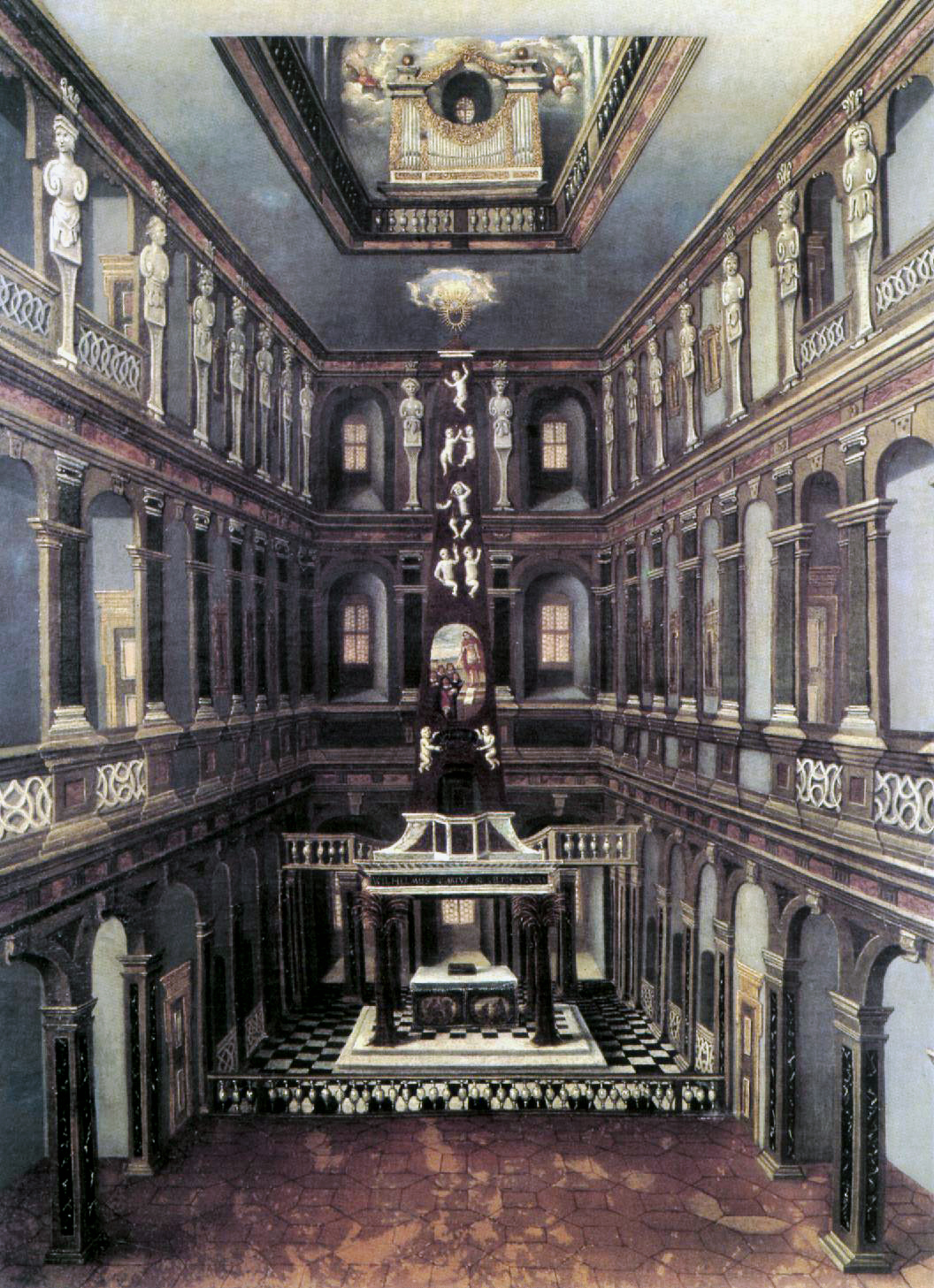
- The Schlosskirche in Weimar
- Related: base for Crucifixus of Mass in B minor
- Occasion: Jubilate
- Cantata text: Salomon Franck
- Chorale: "Was Gott tut, das ist wohlgetan"; "Jesu, meine Freude"
- Performed: 12 April 1714: Weimar
- Movements: 7
- Vocal: SATB choir; solo: alto, tenor and bass
- Instrumental: trumpet; oboe; bassoon; 2 violins; 2 violas; continuo

Weinen, Klagen, Sorgen, Zagen (Weeping, lamenting, worrying, fearing), BWV 12, is a church cantata by Johann Sebastian Bach. He composed it in Weimar for Jubilate, the third Sunday after Easter, and led the first performance on 22 April 1714 in the Schlosskirche, the court chapel of the Schloss in Weimar.

Bach was appointed Konzertmeister in Weimar in the spring of 1714, a position that called for the performance of a church cantata each month. He composed Weinen, Klagen, Sorgen, Zagen as the second cantata in the series, on a text probably written by court poet Salomon Franck. The work is structured in seven movements, an instrumental Sinfonia, a choral passacaglia, a recitative on a Bible quotation, three arias and, as the closing chorale, the last stanza from Samuel Rodigast's hymn "Was Gott tut, das ist wohlgetan" (1674). The cantata is scored for three vocal soloists, a four-part choir, trumpet, oboe, bassoon, two violins, two violas, and basso continuo.

Bach performed the cantata again in his first year as Thomaskantor – director of church music – in Leipzig, on 30 April 1724. He reworked the first section of the first chorus to form the Crucifixus movement of the Credo in his Mass in B minor. Franz Liszt based extended keyboard compositions on the same material.

== History and words ==
On 2 March 1714 Bach was appointed concertmaster of the Weimar court capelle of the co-reigning dukes Wilhelm Ernst and Ernst August of Saxe-Weimar. As concertmaster, he assumed principal responsibility for composing new works, specifically cantatas for the Schlosskirche (palace church), on a monthly schedule. Weinen, Klagen, Sorgen, Zagen is the second cantata in this series, composed for the Third Sunday after Easter, called Jubilate, after Himmelskönig, sei willkommen, BWV 182, for Palm Sunday and Annunciation, and before Erschallet, ihr Lieder, erklinget, ihr Saiten! BWV 172, for Pentecost. The prescribed readings for that Sunday were from the First Epistle of Peter, "Submit yourselves to every ordinance of man" (1 Peter 2:11–20), and from the Gospel of John, Jesus announcing his second coming in the so-called Farewell Discourse, saying "your sorrow shall be turned into joy" (John 16:16–23). The text, depicting the affliction that Christians have to pass, is assumed to have been written by Salomon Franck, the Weimar court poet who wrote most texts for Bach cantatas of the Weimar period. It follows details of the Gospel and the idea from the epistle reading: "For this is thankworthy, if a man for conscience toward God endure grief, suffering wrongfully." (verse 19). The text of the opening chorus corresponds to John 16:20, the text of the first recitative is taken from Acts 14:22, "we must through much tribulation enter into the kingdom of God". Franck contends that this is true not only for the disciples who were addressed directly, but for every Christian. Movement 4 sees the suffering of Jesus as a consolation for the afflicted Christian, movement 5 voices a decision to follow Jesus even in suffering, movement 6 offers the consolation that it will be only a short time until all sadness is overcome, alluding to (as in movement 4) Revelation 2:10. The cantata is closed by the sixth and final stanza of the hymn "Was Gott tut, das ist wohlgetan" (1674) by Samuel Rodigast. The theme of the first part of the text is a situation of God's temporary absence.

Bach first performed the cantata in the Weimar court chapel on 22 April 1714, then performed it in Leipzig in his first year as Thomaskantor on 30 April 1724. In Leipzig, Jubilate was the beginning of the trade fair Ostermesse (Easter fair) which attracted visitors for three weeks. His predecessor, Johan Kuhnau, had already noted that "visitors and distinguished gentlemen certainly want to hear something fine in the principal churches."

Bach reworked the first section of the first chorus to form the Crucifixus movement of the Credo in his Mass in B minor, the central movement of that work, three decades later. Franz Liszt based two keyboard works on the first section of movement 2, Prelude after a 'theme from Weinen, Klagen, Sorgen, Zagen' by J. S. Bach (S. 179, 1854) [for organ or piano] and Variations on a theme from 'Weinen, Klagen, Sorgen, Zagen' by J. S. Bach (S. 180, 1862) [for piano].

== Scoring and structure ==
The cantata in seven movements is scored for three vocal soloists (alto (A), tenor (T) and bass (B)), a four-part choir SATB, trumpet (Tr), oboe (Ob), bassoon (Fg), two violins (Vl), two violas (Va) and basso continuo (Bc). The duration is given as c. 28 minutes.

In the following table of the movements, the scoring follows the Neue Bach-Ausgabe. The keys and time signatures are taken from Alfred Dürr, using the symbol for common time (4/4).

Movements of Weinen, Klagen, Sorgen, Zagen
No.	Title	Text	Type	Vocal	Winds	Strings	Key	Time
1			Sinfonia		Ob	2Vl 2Va	F minor	8/8
2	Weinen, Klagen, Sorgen, Zagen; Die das Zeichen Jesu tragen (2b)	Franck	Chorus	SATB	Ob Fg	2Vl 2Va	F minor	3/2
3	Wir müssen durch viel Trübsal	Bible	Recitative	A	Ob Fg	2Vl 2Va	C minor	common time
4	Kreuz und Kronen sind verbunden	Franck	Aria	A	Ob		C minor	common time
5	Ich folge Christo nach	Franck	Aria	B		2Vl	E♭ major	common time
6	Sei getreu, alle Pein	Franck	Aria	T	Tr		G minor	3/4
7	Was Gott tut, das ist wohlgetan	Rodigast	Chorale	SATB		2Vl 2Va	B♭ major	common time

== Music ==
The autograph score is titled "Concerto a 1 Oboe, 2 Violini, 2 Viole, Fagotto è 4 Voci coll' Organo". John Eliot Gardiner notes that the keys of the arias and the closing chorale move upwards like a ladder, ascending by thirds.

=== 1 ===
The cantata is opened by a Sinfonia, marked adagio assai, which resembles the slow movement of an oboe concerto, with an expressive and plaintive solo.

=== 2 ===
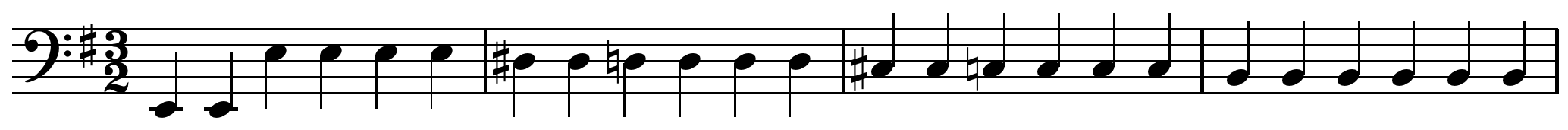
Passus duriusculus, ground bass of the derived movement Crucifixus of the Mass in B minor

The first choral movement, "Weinen, Klagen, Sorgen, Zagen" (Weeping, lamentation, worry, despair), is in da capo form. The first section is built on a basso ostinato as an old-style passacaglia in 3/2 time. The lamento, a chromatic fourth ostinato, is repeated twelve times. Musicologist Julian Mincham notes that Henry Purcell arrived at a similar motif in Dido's Lament in the opera Dido and Aeneas, which Bach probably did not know. The first four words are each sung by a different vocal part, each overlapping the next. Beginning with the highest voice, each part sings an extended sigh. The setting is intensified, until in the seventh repeat all voices continue the text simultaneously: "Angst und Not" ("dread and need" or "anguish and trouble"). The ninth repeat is similar to the first, but in more extreme harmonies. The twelfth repeat is instrumental. The middle section of the line about the Christians "die das Zeichen Jesu tragen" (that bear the marks of Jesus), first marked "un poco allegro", is in a contrasting mood. Its last section is marked andante, the voices enter one after the other, beginning with the lowest and rising. Throughout the middle section, the instruments play colla parte with the voices. John Eliot Gardiner describes the first section as a "tombeau, one of the most impressive and deeply affecting cantata movements Bach can have composed to that point".

=== 3 ===
The only recitative, "Wir müssen durch viel Trübsal in das Reich Gottes eingehen" (We must enter the Kingdom of God through much sorrow), is accompanied by the strings in a recitativo accompagnato.

In German, sorrow is mentioned first, then the final Kingdom of God. Bach repeats the beginning text four times, while the singular destination appears only once. The key word "Trübsal" is illustrated each time by a downward line, each time with more intensity. In the end, an ascending scale in the first violin illustrates the idea of entering the kingdom of God. The scale is in C major, while the movement is in C minor, a symbol of the Kingdom of God which is a seen but not yet present. The scale is related to the beginning of the tune of the closing chorale.

=== 4 ===
The first of three arias, "Kreuz und Krone sind verbunden" (Cross and crown are bound together), reflects the conflicting motifs of "Kreuz und Krone" (cross and crown) and "Kampf und Kleinod" (conflict and jewel). The aria for alto voice and an oboe which is almost always present, is in da capo form, ABA. A ritornello frames part A, but also accompanies the vocal entry. It is thus heard six times in different context, related to the repetitions of the passacaglia of movement 2. The music illustrates the union of the four contrasting elements (all beginning with K): Kampf is sung as a melisma with a trill in measure 15, the preciousness of the jewel appears as a trill in the voice or the accompaniment. The text is also repeated in the middle section, as Bach was still experimenting with the da capo form.

=== 5 ===
In the second aria, "Ich folge Christo nach" (I follow after Christ), the decision to follow Jesus is made. "Walking steps" in imitation symbolize the following. The first motif is an upward scale, illustrating the direction of Heaven, played by the first violin, imitated in fast succession by the second violin and then the continuo. The voice enters with the same motif. Towards the end, the steps are expanded to more than an octave, reaching Heaven. The bass singer and the continuo are in unison, interpreted as a mystical union of man and God.

=== 6 ===
During the last aria, "Sei getreu, alle Pein" (Be faithful, all pain), the trumpet plays the chorale tune "Jesu, meine Freude" as a cantus firmus; Bach may have thought of the stanza "Weicht, ihr Trauergeister" (Go away, mournful spirits). The form of the aria follows the bar form of the chorale instead of the usual da capo form.

=== 7 ===
The closing chorale, "Was Gott tut, das ist wohlgetan" (What God does, is well done), is set for four parts, illuminated by an instrumental obbligato part. Masaaki Suzuki and Gardiner use the trumpet that played the cantus firmus in the preceding aria.

== Recordings ==
The table entries are excerpted from the list of recordings from the selection on the Bach Cantatas Website. Orchestras playing period instruments in historically informed performance, and vocal ensembles with one voice per part are marked by green background.

Recordings of Weinen, Klagen, Sorgen, Zagen
Title	Conductor / Choir / Orchestra	Soloists	Label	Year	Choir type	Orch. type
J. S. Bach: Das Kantatenwerk – Sacred Cantatas Vol. 1	Gustav Leonhardt: Tölzer Knabenchor; Choir of King's College; Leonhardt-Consort	Soloist of the Tölzer Knabenchor; Paul Esswood; Kurt Equiluz; Max van Egmond	Teldec	1971		Period
Die Bach Kantate Vol. 32	Helmuth Rilling Gächinger Kantorei Bach-Collegium Stuttgart	Helen Watts; Adalbert Kraus; Wolfgang Schöne	Hänssler	1972		
Bach Cantatas Vol. 2 – Easter	Karl Richter Münchener Bach-Chor Münchener Bach-Orchester	Anna Reynolds; Peter Schreier; Theo Adam	Archiv Produktion	1974		
J. S. Bach: Complete Cantatas Vol. 2	Ton Koopman Amsterdam Baroque Orchestra & Choir	Kai Wessel; Christoph Prégardien; Klaus Mertens	Antoine Marchand	1995		Period
J.S. Bach: Cantatas Vol. 8 – Leipzig Cantatas	Masaaki Suzuki Bach Collegium Japan	Yoshikazu Mera; Gerd Türk; Peter Kooy	BIS	1996		Period
J.S. Bach: Actus Tragicus – Cantatas BWV 4, 12, 106 & 196	Konrad Junghänel Cantus Cölln	Elisabeth Popien; Gerd Türk; Wilfried Jochens; Stephan Schreckenberger	Harmonia Mundi France	1999	OVPP	Period
Bach Cantatas Vol. 24: Altenburg/Warwick	John Eliot Gardiner: Monteverdi Choir; Choir of Clare; Choir of Trinity College; English Baroque Soloists	William Towers; Mark Padmore; Julian Clarkson	Soli Deo Gloria	2000		Period
Bach Edition Vol. 20 – Cantatas Vol. 11	Pieter Jan Leusink Holland Boys Choir Netherlands Bach Collegium	Sytse Buwalda; Knut Schoch; Bas Ramselaar	Brilliant Classics	2000		Period
J. S. Bach: Weinen, Klagen ...	Philippe Herreweghe Collegium Vocale Gent	Daniel Taylor; Mark Padmore; Peter Kooy	Harmonia Mundi France	2003		Period
J. S. Bach: Cantatas for the Complete Liturgical Year Vol. 11	Sigiswald Kuijken La Petite Bande	Gerlinde Sämann; Petra Noskaiová; Christoph Genz; Jan van der Crabben	Accent	2008	OVPP	Period

== Sources ==
- Weinen, Klagen, Sorgen, Zagen, BWV 12: performance by the Netherlands Bach Society (video and background information)
- Weinen, Klagen, Sorgen, Zagen, BWV 12: Scores at the International Music Score Library Project
- Weinen, Klagen, Sorgen, Zagen BWV 12; BC A 68 / Sacred cantata (4th Sunday of Easter) Bach Digital
- BWV 12 Weinen, Klagen, Sorgen, Zagen: English translation, University of Vermont
- Text-, Liedvorlagen, Bibelkonkordanzen und Besetzungsangaben / zu den geistlichen Kantaten Johann Sebastian Bachs / BWV 12 s-line.de (in German)
- Cantata BWV 12 jsbchorales.net
- Günther Zedler: Die erhaltenen Kirchenkantaten Johann Sebastian Bachs (in German)
- Christian Wolff: Kantate "Weinen, Klagen, Sorgen, Zagen" BWV 12 Thomaskirche 2013 (in German)
- Luke Dahn: BWV 12.7 bach-chorales.com
