= Nimm, was dein ist, und gehe hin, BWV 144 =

Church cantata by Johann Sebastian Bach

Nimm, was dein ist, und gehe hin
- BWV 144
- Church cantata by J. S. Bach
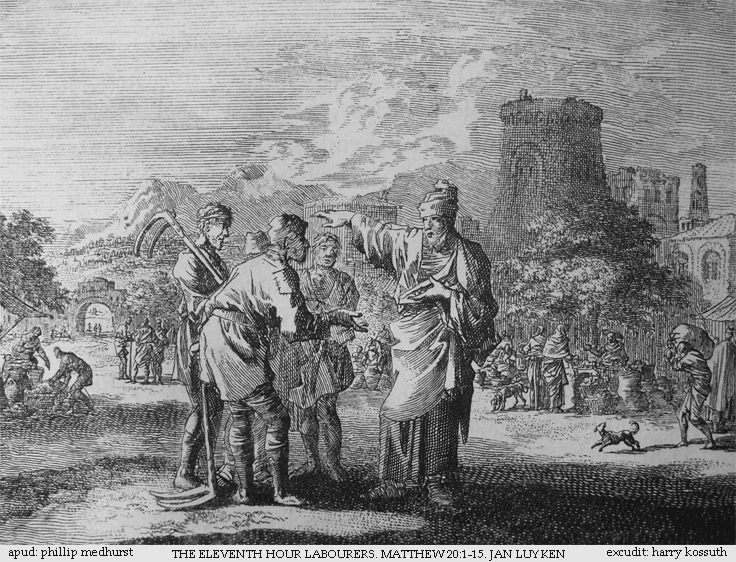
- The eleventh hour labourers etching by Jan Luyken
- Occasion: Septuagesimae
- Bible text: Matthew 20:14
- Chorale: "Was mein Gott will, das g'scheh allzeit"
- Performed: 6 February 1724: Leipzig
- Movements: 6
- Vocal: SATB choir; solo: soprano, alto and tenor
- Instrumental: 2 oboes d'amore; 2 oboes; 2 violins; viola; continuo

Nimm, was dein ist, und gehe hin (Take what is yours and go away), BWV 144, is a church cantata by Johann Sebastian Bach. He composed it in Leipzig for the Sunday Septuagesimae, the third Sunday before Lent, and first performed it on 6 February 1724.

== History and words ==
Bach wrote the cantata in his first year in Leipzig for Septuagesima, the third Sunday before Lent. The prescribed readings for the Sunday were taken from the First Epistle to the Corinthians, "race for victory" (1 Corinthians 9:24–10:5), and from the Gospel of Matthew, the parable of the Workers in the Vineyard (Matthew 20:1–16). The unknown poet derives from the gospel only the thought to be content with one's lot and submit to God's will, "Genügsamkeit" (contentedness) being a key word. The opening chorus is based on verse 14 of the gospel. The third movement 3 is the first stanza of Samuel Rodigast's hymn "Was Gott tut, das ist wohlgetan". The closing chorale is the first stanza of Albert, Duke of Prussia's "Was mein Gott will, das g'scheh allzeit" (1547).

Bach first performed the cantata on 6 February 1724.

== Scoring and structure ==
The cantata in six movements is scored for soprano, alto and tenor soloists, a four-part choir (SATB), two oboes, oboe d'amore, two violins, viola, and basso continuo.

1. Chorus: Nimm, was dein ist, und gehe hin
2. Aria (alto): Murre nicht, lieber Christ
3. Chorale: Was Gott tut, das ist wohlgetan
4. Recitative (tenor): Wo die Genügsamkeit regiert
5. Aria (soprano): Genügsamkeit ist ein Schatz in diesem Leben
6. Chorale: Was mein Gott will, das g'scheh allzeit

== Music ==
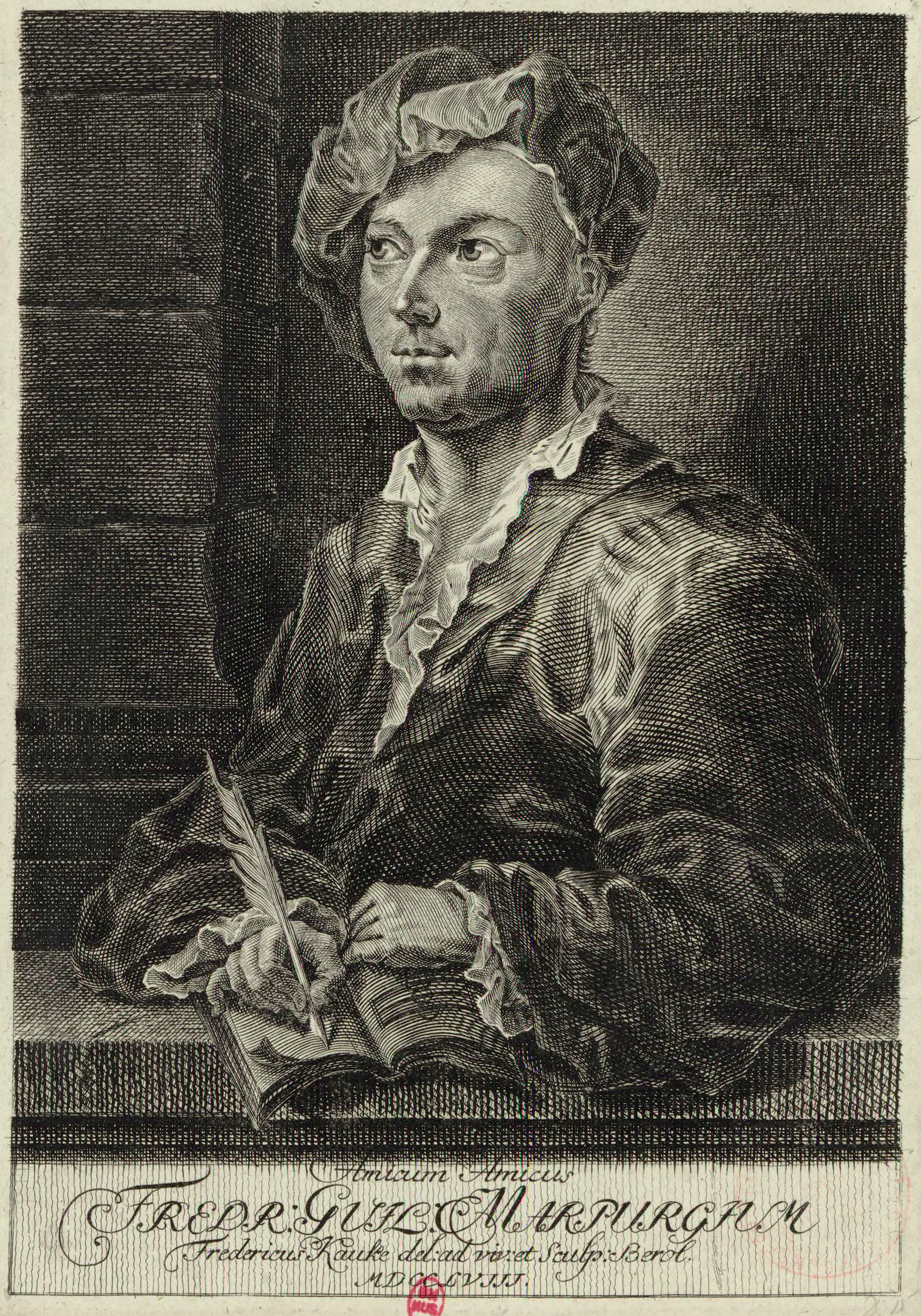
Friedrich Wilhelm Marpurg, after a drawing by Friedrich Kauke (1758)

Bach composed the extremely short biblical quote of the opening chorus as a motet fugue with the instruments playing colla parte, thus intensifying the attention for the words. The phrase "Gehe hin" (go away) is first presented in the slow motion of the theme, but then as a countersubject repeated twice, four times as fast as before. As John Eliot Gardiner notes: "In 1760 the Berlin music theoretician Friedrich Wilhelm Marpurg singled out the opening of this cantata, admiring the "splendid declamation which the composer has applied to the main section and to a special little play on the words, "gehe hin!"". (Original German: "die vortreffliche Deklamation", die "der Componist im Hauptsatze und in einem kleinen besonderen Spiele mit dem gehe hin angebracht hatte".) Bach repeated the "gehe hin"-figure sixty times in sixty-eight bars. The first aria has a menuet character. In "Murre nicht, lieber Christ" (Do not grumble, dear Christian), the grumbling is illustrated by repeated eighth notes in the accompaniment. Movement 3 is the first stanza of the chorale "Was Gott tut, das ist wohlgetan" which Bach used later that year completely for his chorale cantata BWV 99, and again in the 1730s for BWV 100. The words "Was Gott tut, das ist wohlgetan" are repeated as a free arioso concluding the following recitative. The soprano aria is accompanied by an oboe d'amore obbligato. Instead of a da capo, the complete text is repeated in a musical variation. The closing chorale is set for four parts.

== Recordings ==
- Bach Made in Germany Vol. 1 – Cantatas III, Günther Ramin, Thomanerchor, Gewandhausorchester Leipzig, Elisabeth Meinel-Asbahr, Lotte Wolf-Matthäus, Gert Lutze, Eterna 1952
- Die Bach Kantate Vol. 25, Helmuth Rilling, Gächinger Kantorei, Bach-Collegium Stuttgart, Arleen Augér, Helen Watts, Adalbert Kraus, Hänssler 1978
- J. S. Bach: Das Kantatenwerk – Sacred Cantatas Vol. 8, Gustav Leonhardt, Knabenchor Hannover, Collegium Vocale Gent, Leonhardt Consort, soloist of the Knabenchor Hannover, Paul Esswood, Kurt Equiluz, Teldec 1984
- J. S. Bach: Complete Cantatas Vol. 7, Ton Koopman, Amsterdam Baroque Orchestra & Choir, Lisa Larsson, Bogna Bartosz, Gerd Türk, Antoine Marchand 1997
- J. S. Bach: Complete Cantatas Vol. 9, Pieter Jan Leusink, Holland Boys Choir, Netherlands Bach Collegium, Ruth Holton, Sytse Buwalda, Knut Schoch, Brilliant Classics 1999
- Bach Cantatas Vol. 20: Naarden / Southwell, John Eliot Gardiner, Monteverdi Choir, English Baroque Soloists, Miah Persson, Wilke te Brummelstroete, James Oxley, Soli Deo Gloria 2000
- J. S. Bach: Cantatas Vol. 17 – Cantatas from Leipzig 1724, Masaaki Suzuki, Bach Collegium Japan, Yukari Nonoshita, Robin Blaze, Gerd Türk, BIS 2001

== Sources ==
- Nimm, was dein ist, und gehe hin, BWV 144: Scores at the International Music Score Library Project
- Nimm, was dein ist, und gehe hin BWV 144; BC A 41 / Sacred cantata (Septuagesima) Bach Digital
- Cantata BWV 144 Nimm, was dein ist, und gehe hin: history, scoring, sources for text and music, translations to various languages, discography, discussion, Bach Cantatas Website
- BWV 144 Nimm, was dein ist, und gehe hin: English translation, University of Vermont
- BWV 144 Nimm, was dein ist, und gehe hin: text, scoring, University of Alberta
- Chapter 41 BWV 144 Nimm, was dein ist, und gehe hin: a listener and student guide by Julian Mincham 2010
- Luke Dahn: BWV 144.3, BWV 144.6 bach-chorales.com
