= La Petite Bande =

Belgium-based music ensemble

La Petite Bande is a Belgium-based ensemble specialising in music of the Baroque and Classical eras played on period instruments. They are particularly known for their recordings of works by Corelli, Rameau, Handel, Bach, Haydn, and Mozart.

== History ==
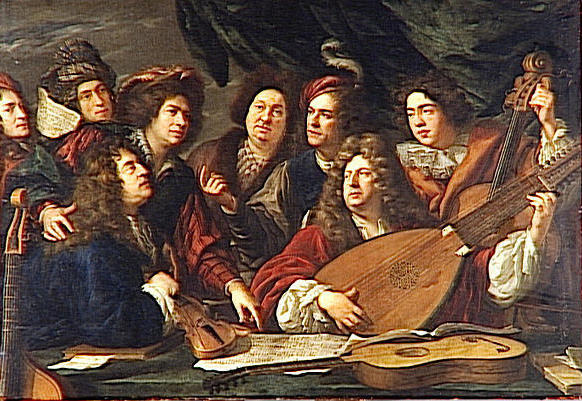
Jean-Baptiste Lully (holding the violin) surrounded by musicians at the court of Louis XIV. La Petite Bande takes its name from Lully's orchestra, La Petite Bande des Violons du Roi. (Painting by François Puget, 1688.)

The ensemble was brought together in 1972 by Sigiswald Kuijken, originally for the one-off purpose of recording Jean-Baptiste Lully's comédie-ballet, Le Bourgeois gentilhomme, conducted by Gustav Leonhardt for the Deutsche Harmonia Mundi label. The ensemble was given its name from Lully's Petite Bande des Violons du Roi, an orchestra of 21 string players at the court of Louis XIV. The nucleus of the original group was the Leonhardt Consort along with Sigiswald Kuijken and his brothers Wieland and Barthold. Following the recording, the group continued to give concerts throughout Europe and became a permanent ensemble based in Leuven with Kuijken as director. Their initial repertoire concentrated on French Baroque music, but soon branched out into Italian and German composers, including Corelli, Handel and Bach. They also branched out from the Baroque to the Classical period with performances and recordings of works by Haydn and Mozart. The ensemble's 1982 recording of Haydn's The Creation was the first time the work had been recorded using period instruments. Their UK debut was at the 1982 BBC Proms, with a concert of pieces by Bach, Handel, and Rameau. The critic Barry Millington described the performance in The Musical Times:

The group has an endearing attitude of indifference to concert platform ritual: each player is dressed for a different occasion. But there is nothing casual about their playing: this is some of the best-disciplined Baroque playing to be heard today.

La Petite Bande's recordings of operatic rarities during their first ten years include Rameau's Zoroastre, Zaïs, and Pigmalion as well as Campra's L'Europe galante and Grétry's Le jugement de Midas. From 2006 to 2012, the ensemble has largely concentrated on Bach, especially his cantatas with the goal of recording a complete liturgical year, but also his St John Passion, St Matthew Passion and Mass in B minor. Singers in these projects, each part sung by one singer, have included sopranos Gerlinde Sämann, Barbara Schlick, Elisabeth Scholl and Siri Thornhill, altos René Jacobs and Petra Noskaiová, tenors Christoph Genz, Christoph Prégardien and Marcus Ullmann, and basses Jan van der Crabben, Max van Egmond and Harry van der Kamp.

On 2 February 2009, Sigiswald Kuijken was awarded the Prize for Cultural Merit by the Belgian government. The following day, the advisory committee of the Ministry of Culture recommended that La Petite Bande's 600,000 euro annual subsidy be removed. Kuijken's students started an internet petition to save the subsidy which received 21,000 signatures. The Minister of Culture at the time, Bert Anciaux, ignored the advice of the committee and restored the subsidy until 2012 (reduced to 590,000 euro). The ensemble has since started a charitable foundation, Support La Petite Bande, to make up the shortfall. Some funding was subsequently granted for 2013 to 2016.

In 2011, Kuijken decided to leave the future direction of the ensemble to younger musicians and chose the organist Benjamin Alard to direct a new Handel project which began in April 2013.

== Discography ==
- 1973 – J. Lully – Le Bourgeois Gentilhomme – DHM
- 1974 – A. Campra – L'Europe Galante (extracts) – DHM
- 1975 – G. Muffat – Suites en Concerti Grossi – DHM
- 1977 – A. Corelli – Concerti Grossi Op. 6, nrs. 1–4 – DHM
- 1978 – A. Corelli – Concerti Grossi Op. 6, nrs. 6–12 – DHM
- 1978 – J.-P. Rameau – Zaïs – WDR/Stil
- 1979 – J.-P. Rameau – Suite from Hippolyte et Aricie – DHM
- 1980 – A. Vivaldi – Quattro Stagioni – RCA/Seon
- 1980 – G. F. Handel – Partenope – WDR/DHM
- 1981 – A. E. M. Grétry – Le Jugement de Midas (extracts) – WDR/Ricercar
- 1981 – J.-P. Rameau – Pygmalion – WDR/DHM
- 1982 – J. S. Bach – Orchestral Suites (Overtures) BWV 1066–1069 – WDR/DHM
- 1982 – J. S. Bach – Violinkonzerte BWV 1041–1043 – WDR/DHM
- 1982 – C.W. Gluck – Orfeo ed Euridice
- 1983 – J. Haydn – Die Schöpfung
- 1984 – J.-P. Rameau – Zoroastre – WDR/DHM
- 1985 – G. F. Handel – Alessandro – WDR/DHM
- 1986 – J. S. Bach – Mass in B minor – WDR/DHM
- 1986 – W. A. Mozart – Davide penitente K. 469 / Ave Verum Corpus K. 618 – WDR/DHM
- 1987 – C. P. E. Bach – Die Letzten Leiden des Erlösers – WDR/DHM
- 1987 – W. A. Mozart – Requiem (Live recording)
- 1987 – W. A. Mozart – Flute Concertos – WDR/DHM
- 1988 – J. Haydn – L'Infedelta Delusa – WDR/DHM
- 1988 – J. S. Bach – St John Passion BWV 245 – WDR/DHM
- 1988 – W. A. Mozart – Concert arias – Virgin Classics
- 1989 – J. Haydn – Symphonies 25, 52, 53 – Virgin Classics
- 1989 – J. Haydn – Symphonies 90, 91 – Virgin Classics
- 1989 – J. S. Bach – Magnificat – Virgin Classics
- 1990 – J. Haydn – Die Jahreszeiten – Virgin Classics
- 1990 – J. S. Bach – St Matthew Passion – BMG/DHM
- 1992 – J. Haydn – Symphonies 88, 89, 92 – Virgin Classics
- 1993 – J. Haydn – Symphonies 93, 94, 95 – BMG/DHM
- 1993 – J. S. Bach – Brandenburg Concertos I–VI – BMG/DHM
- 1993 – J. S. Bach – Motetten BWV 225–230
- 1993 – W. A. Mozart – Così fan tutte (live recording)
- 1994 – J. Haydn – Symphonies 96, 97, 98 – BMG/DHM
- 1994 – J. S. Bach – Kantaten 49, 58, 82
- 1995 – J. Haydn – Harmoniemesse/Te Deum – BMG/DHM
- 1995 – J. Haydn – Symphonies 99, 100, 101 – BMG/DHM
- 1996 – J. Haydn – Symphonies 102, 103, 104 – DHM
- 1996 – W. A. Mozart – Don Giovanni (Live recording)
- 1996 – W. A. Mozart – Sinfonia Concertante K. 364, Violin Concerto K. 216 – Denon
- 1997 – G. B. Pergolesi – La Serva Padrona/Livieta e Tracollo
- 1997 – J. Lully – Concert de Danse – Charpentier, Rebel
- 1997 – W. A. Mozart – Violin Concerts K. 218–219 – Denon
- 1998 – W. A. Mozart – Violin Concerts K. 207–211 Concertone K. 190 – Denon
- 1999 – J. Haydn – Cello Concertos D major and C major – DHM
- 1999 – W. A. Mozart – Le nozze di Figaro
- 2000 – H. Schütz – Weihnachtshistorie – DHM
- 2001 – J. S. Bach – Mass in B minor BWV 232 – Urtext
- 2002 – J. S. Bach – Cantatas BWV 9, 94, 187 – Deutsche Harmonia Mundi (DHM)
- 2002 – W. A. Mozart – Arias & Duets – DHM
- 2003 – C. P. E. Bach – Die Auferstehung und Himmelfahrt Jesu – Hyperion
- 2004 – J. G. Graun – Der Tod Jesu
- 2004 – J. S. Bach – Motets BWV 225–229
- 2005 – J. S. Bach – Cantatas Vol.1 BWV 98, 180, 56, 55
- 2005 – W. A. Mozart – Die Zauberflöte
- 2006 – J. S. Bach – Cantatas Vol. 2 BWV 177, 93, 135
- 2006 – J. S. Bach – Cantatas Vol. 3 BWV 82, 178, 102
- 2007 – W.A. Mozart – Cassations K. 63 – K. 99 and Divertimento K. 205
- 2007 – J. S. Bach – Cantatas Vol. 4 BWV 16, 153, 65, 154
- 2007 – J. S. Bach – Cantatas Vol. 5 BWV 179, 35, 164, 17
- 2008 – C. Monteverdi – Vespro della Beata Vergine SV 206
- 2008 – J. S. Bach – Cantatas Vol. 7 BWV 20, 2, 10
- 2009 – J. S. Bach – Mass in B minor BWV 232
- 2009 – J. S. Bach – Cantatas Vol. 8 BWV 13, 73, 81, 144
- 2009 – J. S. Bach – Cantatas Vol. 9 BWV 61, 36, 62, 132
- 2009 – J. S. Bach – Cantatas Vol. 10 BWV 108, 86, 11, 4
- 2010 – J. S. Bach – Brandenburg Concertos BWV 1047–1051
- 2010 – J. S. Bach – St Matthew Passion BWV 243
- 2010 – J. S. Bach – Cantatas Vol. 11 BWV 67, 9, 12
- 2010 – J. S. Bach – Cantatas Vol. 12 BWV 138, 27, 47, 99
- 2011 – Vivaldi – Flute concertos
- 2011 – J. S. Bach – Cantatas Vol. 13 BWV 249, 6
- 2011 – J. S. Bach – Cantatas Vol. 14 BWV 91, 57, 151, 122
- 2012 – D. Buxtehude – Membra Jesu Nostri BuxWV75
- 2012 – J. S. Bach – St John Passion
- 2012 – J. S. Bach – Cantatas Vol. 15 BWV 52, 60, 116, 140
- 2012 – J. Haydn – Die Tageszeiten: Symphonies Nos. 6, 7, 8 (Diapason d'or)

== Sources ==
- Anon. (1983). "Joseph Haydn: Die Schöpfung (The Creation)". Continuo. 6–7.
- Anon. (2009). "La Petite Bande zoekt 600.000 euro per jaar" [La Petite Bande Seeking 600,000 Per Year]. Het Nieuwsblad (Thursday, 3 December) (in Dutch). Archived from the original on 11 June 2011.
- Chapin, Anna Alice (2008) [1904]. Makers of Song. Read Books. ISBN 978-1-4086-7129-0.
- Clements, Dominy (2007). "Johann Sebastian Bach (1685–1750): Cantatas for the complete liturgical year, Vol.V". Musicweb-international.
- Fiske, Roger (January 1984). "Haydn: Die Schöpfung". Gramophone: 55.
- Kemp, Lindsay (November 1997). "Happy 25th birthday". Gramophone: 21–22.
- Kenyon, Nicholas (1988). Authenticity and Early Music. Oxford University Press. ISBN 978-0-19-816153-0.
- "Sigiswald Kuijken bereidt opvolging voor". Knack (in Dutch). 13 September 2011. Archived from the original on 31 May 2012.
- Littler, William (1990). "Virgin Classics' Early Music Series Includes Superb Byrd Third Mass". Toronto Star (23 March). p. D18.
- Millington, Barry (1982). "Music in London: Proms". The Musical Times. 123 (1676, October): 706–708. doi:10.2307/962160. JSTOR 962160.
- Van der Speeten, Geert (2009). "Een prijs, maar ook een slecht rapport" [A Prize, but Also a Bad Report]. De Standaard (4 February) (in Dutch).
- Watchorn, Peter (2007). Isolde Ahlgrimm, Vienna and the Early Music Revival. Ashgate Publishing. ISBN 978-0-7546-5787-3.
