= Die Elenden sollen essen, BWV 75 =

Church cantata by Johann Sebastian Bach

Die Elenden sollen essen
- BWV 75
- Church cantata by J. S. Bach
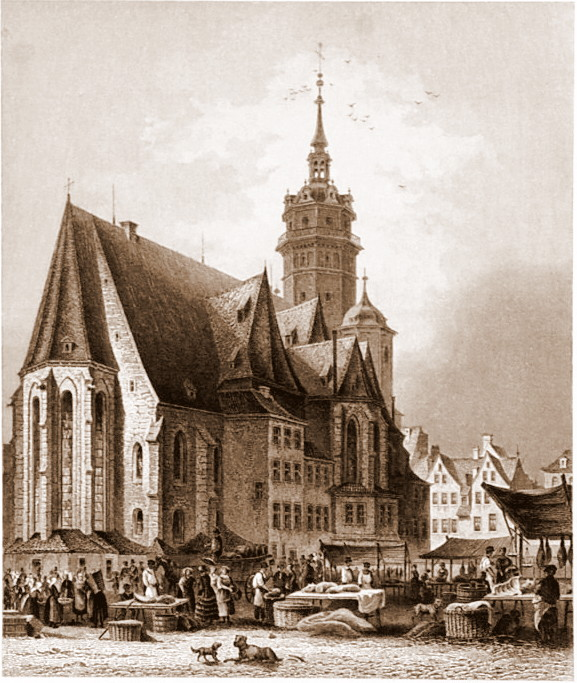
- Nikolaikirche, c. 1850
- Occasion: First Sunday after Trinity
- Bible text: Psalms 22:26
- Chorale: "Was Gott tut, das ist wohlgetan"
- Composed: 1723: Köthen
- Performed: 30 May 1723: Leipzig
- Movements: 14 in two parts (7, 7)
- Vocal: SATB choir and solo
- Instrumental: trumpet; 2 oboes; oboe d'amore; 2 violins; viola; continuo

Johann Sebastian Bach composed the church cantata Die Elenden sollen essen (The miserable shall eat), BWV 75, for the first Sunday after Trinity. He led its first performance in Leipzig on 30 May 1723, his first Sunday in the position of Thomaskantor. The complex work is in two parts, each consisting of seven movements, and marks the beginning of his first annual cycle of cantatas.

Bach composed the cantata at a decisive turning point in his career. After various positions in churches and courts, he assumed the post of Thomaskantor in Leipzig on the first Sunday after Trinity, performing this cantata. In taking this job he in fact became responsible for the church music in four churches of Leipzig, and he began the ambitious project of composing a new cantata for every occasion of the liturgical year.

The work's structure is unusual in that it is in two symmetrical parts; seven of the fourteen movements are intended to be performed before the sermon, the other seven after it. The first part's text begins with a quotation from Psalm 22 and contrasts wealth and poverty. The text in the second part is focused on being poor or rich in spirit. Each part is concluded by a stanza of Samuel Rodigast's hymn "Was Gott tut, das ist wohlgetan". Bach scored the cantata for four vocal soloists and a four-part choir (SATB), and a Baroque instrumental ensemble of trumpet, two oboes, oboe d'amore, two violins, viola, and basso continuo including bassoon. Parts I and II are each arranged in the same sequence: an opening movement (which is a chorus in Part I, a sinfonia in Part II), followed by alternating recitatives and arias, and a concluding chorale. The performance was acknowledged in the press, noting that Bach "produced his first music here with great success."

== Background ==
Johann Sebastian Bach had served in several churches as Kantor and organist, and at the courts of Weimar and Köthen, when he applied for the post of Thomaskantor in Leipzig. He was 38 years old and had a reputation as an organist and organ expert. He had composed church cantatas, notably the funeral cantata Actus tragicus in Mühlhausen around 1708. In Weimar, he had begun a project to cover all occasions of the liturgical year by providing one cantata a month for four years, including works such as Weinen, Klagen, Sorgen, Zagen, BWV 12, and Erschallet, ihr Lieder, BWV 172.

== History and words ==
Bach composed the cantata for the First Sunday after Trinity and first performed it in the service in the Nikolaikirche on 30 May 1723, to take up his position as Thomaskantor. From then on, he was responsible for the education of the Thomanerchor, performances in the regular services in the Thomaskirche, the Nikolaikirche, Neue Kirche and Petrikirche. He started a project of composing one cantata for each Sunday and holiday of the liturgical year, termed by Christoph Wolff "an artistic undertaking on the largest scale".

The prescribed readings for the Sunday were from the First Epistle of John, "God is Love" (1 John 4:16–21), and from the Gospel of Luke, the parable of the Rich man and Lazarus (Luke 16:19–31). An unknown poet begins the cantata with a verse from a psalm, Psalms 22:26 (verse 27 in the Luther Bible), "The meek shall eat and be satisfied: they shall praise the Lord that seek him: your heart shall live for ever", connecting the gospel to the Old Testament as a starting point. The later cantata for the same occasion, Brich dem Hungrigen dein Brot, BWV 39 (Break your bread for the hungry), begins similarly with a quotation from the Old Testament. The poet expanded on the contrast of "Reichtum und Armut" (wealth and poverty, rich and poor) in fourteen elaborate movements, arranged in two parts to be performed before and after the sermon. The poet focused on the contrast of "Reichtum und Armut" (wealth and poverty, rich and poor) Both parts are concluded by a stanza of Samuel Rodigast's hymn "Was Gott tut, das ist wohlgetan", stanza 2 in movement 7, and stanza 6 in movement 14.

The autograph score is written neatly on non-Leipzig paper, probably while Bach still lived in Köthen.

== Reception ==
A Leipzig chronicle, "Acta Lipsiensium academica", reported the social event: "... führte ... Hr. Joh. Sebastian Bach ... mit gutem applauso seine erste Music auf" (... performed ... with good applause his first music). "Good applause" means "great approval" rather than clapping of hands. A different translation renders the note as "... the new Cantor and Director of the Collegium Musicum, Herr Johann Sebastian Bach, who has come hither from the Prince's court of Cöthen, produced his first music here with great success."

== Music ==
=== Structure and scoring ===
The cantata is structured in two parts of seven movements each, to be performed before and after the sermon. It is scored for four vocal soloists (soprano (S), alto (A), tenor (T) and bass (B)), a four-part choir SATB, trumpet (Tr), two oboes (Ob), oboe d'amore (Oa), two violins (Vl), viola (Va), and basso continuo (Bc) including bassoon. The two parts of seven movements each are composed as the same arrangement of alternating recitatives and arias with a concluding chorale, only Part II is opened by a sinfonia instead of a chorus. The duration is given as 40 minutes.

In the following table of the movements, the scoring follows the Neue Bach-Ausgabe. The keys and time signatures are taken from Alfred Dürr, using for common time rather than the numeric 4/4. The instruments are shown separately for winds and strings, while the continuo, playing throughout, is not shown.

Movements of Die Elenden sollen essen, Part I
No.	Title	Text	Type	Vocal	Winds	Strings	Key	Time
1	Die Elenden sollen essen	Psalm 22:26	Chorus	SATB	2Ob Fg	2Vl Va	E minor	3/4
2	Was hilft des Purpurs Majestät	anon.	Recitative	B		2Vl Va		common time
3	Mein Jesus soll mein alles sein	anon.	Aria	T	Ob	2Vl Va	G major	common time
4	Gott stürzet und erhöhet	anon.	Recitative	T				common time
5	Ich nehme mein Leiden mit Freuden auf mich	anon.	Aria	S	Oa		A minor	3/8
6	Indes schenkt Gott ein gut Gewissen	anon.	Recitative	S				common time
7	Was Gott tut, das ist wohlgetan	Rodigast	Chorale	SATB	2Ob	2Vl Va	G major	common time

Movements of Die Elenden sollen essen, Part II
No.	Title	Text	Type	Vocal	Winds	Strings	Key	Time
8			Sinfonia		Tr	2Vl Va	G major	cut time
9	Nur eines kränkt	anon.	Recitative	A		2Vl Va		common time
10	Jesus macht mich geistlich reich	anon.	Aria	A		2Vl unis.	E minor	3/8
11	Wer nur in Jesu bleibt	anon.	Recitative	B				common time
12	Mein Herze glaubt und liebt	anon.	Aria	B	Tr	Vl Va	C major	common time
13	O Armut, der kein Reichtum gleicht	anon.	Recitative	T				common time
14	Was Gott tut, das ist wohlgetan	Rodigast	Chorale	SATB	2Ob	2Vl Va	G major	common time

=== Movements ===
Bach marked the occasion, creating the opening chorus reminiscent of a French overture, with a slow first section in dotted rhythm and a fast fugue. He chose the same form one year later to begin his second annual cycle of chorale cantatas with O Ewigkeit, du Donnerwort, BWV 20. The composition can also be seen as a prelude and fugue on a large scale. The prelude is again in two sections separated by a short interlude, in the way of a motet according to the different ideas of the text. In the fugue on the words "Euer Herz soll ewiglich leben" (your heart shall live for ever), the subject is developed three times, again separated by interludes.

Four of the recitatives are "secco", accompanied only by the continuo, but the first one of each part is "accompagnato", brightened by the strings. In the arias, the voice and the instruments mostly share the themes. The arias can be considered as a suite of French dance movements, the tenor a Polonaise, the soprano aria a Minuet, the alto aria a Passepied and the bass aria a Gigue. In the last aria, the trumpet opens the setting and then accompanies the bass in virtuoso figuration, adding splendour to the words "Mein Herze glaubt und liebt" (My heart believes and loves).

The music of the two stanzas of the chorale is identical. The tune is not a simple four-part setting as in most of Bach's later cantatas, but the voices are embedded in a concerto of the orchestra, led by violin I and oboe I. The instrumental theme is derived from the first line of the chorale tune.

The sinfonia beginning Part II, rare in Bach's cantatas, is especially remarkable because it is a chorale fantasia on the same chorale melody. The trumpet (which was silent throughout Part I) plays the tune as cantus firmus against a polyphonic string setting, emphasizing once more "Was Gott tut, das ist wohlgetan" (What God does is well done).

== Recordings ==
The entries of the following table are taken from the list of recordings as provided by Bach Cantatas Website. Ensembles playing on period instruments in historically informed performances are marked by green background.

Recordings of Die Elenden sollen essen, BWV 75
Title	Conductor / Choir / Orchestra	Soloists	Label	Year	Orch. type
Die Bach Kantate Vol. 38	Helmuth Rilling Frankfurter Kantorei Bach-Collegium Stuttgart	Ingeborg Reichelt; Verena Gohl (alto, 1); Julia Hamari (alto, 9,10); Adalbert Kraus; Hanns-Friedrich Kunz	Hänssler	1970	Chamber
J. S. Bach: Das Kantatenwerk • Complete Cantatas • Les Cantates, Folge / Vol. 19	Gustav Leonhardt: Knabenchor Hannover; Collegium Vocale Gent; Leonhardt-Consort	Marcus Klein (soloist of the Knabenchor Hannover); Paul Esswood; Adalbert Kraus; Max van Egmond	Teldec	1977	Period
J. S. Bach: Complete Cantatas Vol. 6	Ton Koopman Amsterdam Baroque Orchestra & Choir	Ruth Ziesak; Elisabeth von Magnus; Paul Agnew; Klaus Mertens	Antoine Marchand	1998	Period
J. S. Bach: Cantatas Vol. 8 – Leipzig Cantatas	Masaaki Suzuki Bach Collegium Japan	Midori Suzuki; Yoshikazu Mera; Gerd Türk; Peter Kooy	BIS	1998	Period
Bach Edition Vol. 19 – Cantatas Vol. 10	Pieter Jan Leusink Holland Boys Choir Netherlands Bach Collegium	Ruth Holton; Sytse Buwalda; Knut Schoch; Bas Ramselaar	Brilliant Classics	2000	Period
Bach Cantatas Vol. 1: City of London / For the 1st Sunday after Trinity	John Eliot Gardiner Monteverdi Choir English Baroque Soloists	Gillian Keith; Wilke te Brummelstroete; Paul Agnew; Dietrich Henschel	Soli Deo Gloria	2000	Period
J. S. Bach: Weinen, Klagen	Philippe Herreweghe Collegium Vocale Gent	Carolyn Sampson; Daniel Taylor; Mark Padmore; Peter Kooy	Harmonia Mundi France	2003	Period
