= Les Vingt-quatre Violons du Roi =

Five–part string ensemble at the French royal court

Les Vingt-quatre Violons du Roi (in original orthography Les Vingt-quatre Violons du Roy and in English The King's Twenty-Four Violins - meaning 24 violin-family instruments) was a five–part string ensemble at the French royal court, existing from 1626 to 1761. The five parts, or parties, were premier, haut-contre, taille, quinte, and basse, equivalent to violin, alto viola, tenor viola, low-tenor viola, and cello.

== History ==
Les Vingt-quatre Violons du Roi were founded in 1626 under Louis XIII. As part of the Musique de la Chambre they played in the musical accompaniment to festivities and official events at the Versailles court.

Within five years, by 1631, the British royal court of Charles I had copied the structure (“treble violins,” “contratenor violins,” “tenor violins,” “low-tenor violins” and “bass violins,” to use the terms applied in London at the time), but with a total of fourteen instruments (3, 2, 3, 2, and 4). In the 1670s, Charles II, who lived at Versailles during the British Interregnum, exactly matched the forces of Les Vingt-quatre Violons du Roi, as he had experienced them as Louis XIV’s guest, showing the influence by place and time of the French formation.

Meanwhile at Versailles, the Vingt-quatre Violons were combined when needed with the wind instruments of the Grande Écurie, the royal stables, which were used for hunting, war, and celebratory open-air occasions. This combination became in fact the world’s first true orchestra, as that term is understood in Western art music. It would be used later in the pit of the Opéra Royal at Versailles under Lully’s direction.

Each member of the Vingt-quatre Violons had to have an impeccable reputation and had to be Roman Catholic. Their privileges included tax exemption and the right to carry a rapier. Among the members were Lully, Jean-Féry Rebel, his son François Rebel, and Jacques Aubert. In 1656, under Louis XIV, the membership was augmented by a group of 16, later 21, string players called La Petite Bande. The Vingt-quatre Violons were then dubbed La Grande Bande.

In 1761 the Vingt-quatre Violons was disbanded for financial reasons and merged with the Chapelle Royale, then responsible for religious festivities.

== Instrumentation ==
The five-part instrumentation of the Vingt-quatre Violons consisted of the following string instruments:

- 6 premiers violons (first violins, tuning: g – d^{1} – a^{1} – e^{2})
- 4 hautes-contre (tuning: c – g – d^{1} – a^{1})
- 4 tailles (tuning: c – g – d^{1} – a^{1})
- 4 quintes (tuning: c – g – d^{1} – a^{1})
- 6 basses de violon (tuning: ‚B flat – F – c – g)

The three middle parts were played by violas of identical tuning, but different sizes (body lengths 37.5 cm, 45 cm and 52.5 cm), resulting in different timbres and volumes. The basses de violon, (English: bass violins), were tuned a whole step lower than today's cello and were slightly larger.

The group could be augmented by the violones doubling the basses de violon. Sometimes a bass viol could be substituted for a basse de violon. The Petite Bande also included several viol players. The instrumentation of the Vingt-quatre Violons drove the five-part string writing that prevailed in 17th- and 18th-century France, especially the early-18th-century orchestral symphonies of Jean-Féry Rebel.

== Literature ==
- Stefan Drees (ed.): Lexikon der Violine, Laaber-Verlag, 2004. ISBN 3-89007-544-4
