= Was Gott tut, das ist wohlgetan, BWV 99 =

1724 cantata by Johann Sebastian Bach

Was Gott tut, das ist wohlgetan
- BWV 99
- Chorale cantata by J. S. Bach
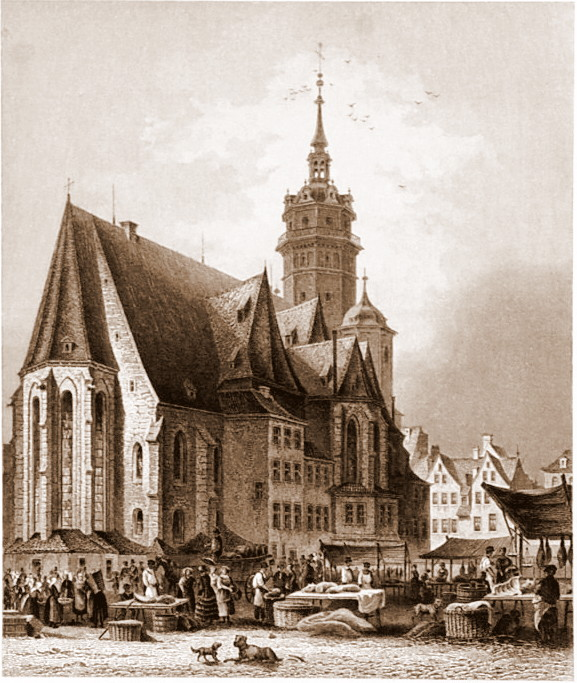
- Nikolaikirche, c. 1850
- Occasion: 15th Sunday after Trinity
- Chorale: "Was Gott tut, das ist wohlgetan" by Samuel Rodigast
- Performed: 17 September 1724: Leipzig
- Movements: six
- Scoring: flauto traverso; oboe d'amore; 2 violins; viola; SATB; solo continuo

Johann Sebastian Bach composed the church cantata Was Gott tut, das ist wohlgetan (What God does is well done), BWV 99, in Leipzig for the 15th Sunday after Trinity and first performed it on 17 September 1724. The chorale cantata is based on the hymn "Was Gott tut, das ist wohlgetan" by Samuel Rodigast (1674).

Was Gott tut, das ist wohlgetan belongs to Bach's chorale cantata cycle, the second cycle during his tenure as Thomaskantor that began in 1723. The text retains the first and last stanza of the hymn unchanged, while the text of the inner stanzas was paraphrased by an unknown librettist into a sequence of four movements of alternating recitatives and arias, retaining some lines from the original chorale. The first movement is a chorale fantasia, and the work is closed by a four-part chorale setting.

The cantata is scored for four vocal soloists, a four-part choir, and a Baroque instrumental ensemble of flauto traverso, oboe d'amore, strings and basso continuo, with a horn doubling the soprano in the outer movements.

== History and words ==
Bach composed the cantata in his second year in Leipzig as part of his second annual cycle of chorale cantatas. for the 15th Sunday after Trinity. The prescribed readings for the Sunday were from the Epistle to the Galatians, Paul's admonition to "walk in the Spirit" (Galatians 5:25–6:10), and from the Gospel of Matthew, from the Sermon on the Mount, the demand not to worry about material needs, but to seek God's kingdom first (Matthew 6:23–34). The cantata text is based on the chorale "Was Gott tut, das ist wohlgetan" by Samuel Rodigast, which is generally related to the Gospel. The hymn was published in 1674, and was thus 50 years old when the chorale cantata was derived from it. Bach used the chorale in several other cantatas, especially later in another chorale cantata, "Was Gott tut, das ist wohlgetan, BWV 100". All six stanzas begin with the same line. An unknown author retained the text of the first and last stanza, but paraphrased the inner four stanzas to as many movements, even retaining some of the rhymes in the second movement. In the fourth movement, he referred to the Gospel, paraphrasing the last verse to "Even if every day has its particular trouble". He introduced references to the cross twice in the fifth movement, stressing the suffering of Jesus and his followers. The librettist did not use the element of beginning each stanza with the same line.

Bach led the Thomanerchor in the first performance on 17 September 1724. Parts indicate a subsequent performance but it could not be dated.

== Music ==
=== Structure and scoring ===
Bach structured the cantata in six movements and scored it for four vocal soloists (soprano (S), alto (A), tenor (T) and bass (B)), a four-part choir, and a Baroque instrumental ensemble of a horn (Co) to reinforce the chorale tune in the outer movements, flauto traverso (Ft), oboe d'amore (Oa), two violins (Vl), viola (Va), violone (Vo) and basso continuo.

In the following table of the movements, the scoring, keys and time signatures are taken from Alfred Dürr's Die Kantaten von J. S. Bach, using the symbol for common time (4/4). The instruments are shown separately for winds and strings, while the continuo, playing throughout, is not shown.

Movements of Was Gott tut, das ist wohlgetan
No.	Title	Text	Type	Vocal	Winds	Strings	Key	Time
1	Was Gott tut, das ist wohlgetan	Rodigast	Chorale fantasia	SATB	Co Ft Oa	2Vl Va	G major	common time
2	Sein Wort der Wahrheit stehet fest	anon.	Recitative	B				common time
3	Erschüttre dich nur nicht, verzagte Seele	anon.	Aria	T	Ft		B minor	3/8
4	Nun, der von Ewigkeit geschloß'ne Bund	anon.	Recitative	A				common time
5	Wenn des Kreuzes Bitterkeiten	anon.	Aria	S A	Ft Oa		B minor	
6	Was Gott tut, das ist wohlgetan	Rodigast	Chorale	SATB	Co Ft Oa	2Vl Va	G major	common time

=== Movements ===
==== 1 ====
The opening chorus, "Was Gott tut, das ist wohlgetan, es bleibt gerecht sein Wille" (What God does is well done, his will remains righteous), is a distinct concerto movement. The strings open with a theme derived from the chorale melody. After 16 measures, a concertino of flute, oboe d'amore and violin begins, with the oboe playing the theme introduced by the strings and the flute playing a virtuoso counterpoint.Three measures later, the voices enter, with the cantus firmus in the soprano, doubled by the horn.

In the interlude following the bar form's stollen, all of the instruments participate in the concerto. This complete sequence is repeated for the second stollen. For the abgesang, the strings and woods play together, and the flute appears as a solo, alternating with the oboe. The postlude is not a repeat of the introduction, but a more complex combination. According to Julian Mincham, "this movement would still work perfectly well if the vocal parts were entirely removed."

==== 2 ====
The first secco recitative is sung by the bass, "Sein Wort der Wahrheit stehet fest und wird mich nicht betrügen" (His word of truth stands fast and will not betray me). It ends on a long coloratura on the last word "wenden", or "turn", as in "can turn aside my misfortune".

==== 3 ====
The first aria, for tenor, "Erschüttre dich nur nicht, verzagte Seele, wenn dir der Kreuzeskelch so bitter schmeckt" (Do not shudder, despairing soul, when the cup of suffering tastes so bitter), is accompanied by the flute. It is another piece from the period written for a capable flute player, following Was frag ich nach der Welt, BWV 94 and Nimm von uns, Herr, du treuer Gott, BWV 101, composed only a few weeks earlier. The text mentions "erschüttern" (shudder); shaking and torment of the soul are pictured in virtuoso figuration, although in the text, the soul is asked not to shudder.

==== 4 ====
The second recitative, for alto, "Nun, der von Ewigkeit geschloß'ne Bund bleibt meines Glaubens Grund" (Now, the covenant sealed from eternity shall remain the foundation of my faith), is similar to the first, ending on the last word "erscheinet", or "appeareth", as in "when God's true loyal will appeareth".

==== 5 ====
The last aria is a duet for soprano and alto, "Wenn des Kreuzes Bitterkeiten mit des Fleisches Schwachheit streiten" (When the bitterness of the cross struggles with the weakness of the flesh). The strings are still silent, while the flute and oboe accompany the voices. The instruments begin with a ritornello, a trio with the continuo. After a first vocal section, a second section presents new material, but refers to the first section by a repeat of instrumental motifs and a complete repeat of the ritornello as a conclusion.

==== 6 ====
The closing chorale, "Was Gott tut, das ist wohlgetan, dabei will ich verbleiben" (What God does, is well done, I will cling to this), is set for four parts.

== Manuscripts and publication ==
The cantata's autograph score is partly extant. The first set of parts was inherited by Anna Magdalena Bach and belonged to the Thomasschule in 1750. It is held by the Bach Archive.

The cantata was first published in 1875, in the first complete edition of Bach's work, the Bach-Gesellschaft Ausgabe. The volume in question was edited by Thomaskantor, Wilhelm Rust. In the Neue Bach-Ausgabe it was published in 1987/88, and edited by Matthias Wendt.

== Recordings ==
A list of recordings is provided on the Bach Cantatas Website. Choirs singing with one voice per part (OVPP) and ensembles playing period instruments in historically informed performances are shown with a green background.

Recordings of Was Gott tut, das ist wohlgetan
Title	Conductor / Choir / Orchestra	Soloists	Label	Year	Orch. type
Die Bach Kantate Vol. 52	Helmuth Rilling Gächinger Kantorei Bach-Collegium Stuttgart	Arleen Augér; Helen Watts; Lutz-Michael Harder; John Bröcheler	Hänssler	1979	
J. S. Bach: Das Kantatenwerk • Complete Cantatas • Les Cantates, Folge / Vol. 5	Nikolaus Harnoncourt Tölzer Knabenchor Concentus Musicus Wien	soloist of the Tölzer Knabenchor; Paul Esswood; Kurt Equiluz; Philippe Huttenlocher	Teldec	1979	Period
Bach Edition Vol. 8 – Cantatas Vol. 3	Pieter Jan Leusink Holland Boys Choir Netherlands Bach Collegium	Ruth Holton; Sytse Buwalda; Knut Schoch; Bas Ramselaar	Brilliant Classics	1999	Period
J. S. Bach: Complete Cantatas Vol. 12	Ton Koopman Amsterdam Baroque Orchestra & Choir	Lisa Larsson; Annette Markert; Christoph Prégardien; Klaus Mertens	Antoine Marchand	2000	Period
Bach Cantatas Vol. 8: Ambronay / Santiago	John Eliot Gardiner Monteverdi Choir English Baroque Soloists	Malin Hartelius; William Towers; James Gilchrist; Peter Harvey	Soli Deo Gloria	2000	Period
J. S. Bach: Cantatas Vol. 25 – Cantatas from Leipzig 1724 (BWV 78, 99, 114)	Masaaki Suzuki Bach Collegium Japan	Yukari Nonoshita; Daniel Taylor; Makoto Sakurada; Peter Kooy	BIS	2003	Period
