= Samuel Rodigast =

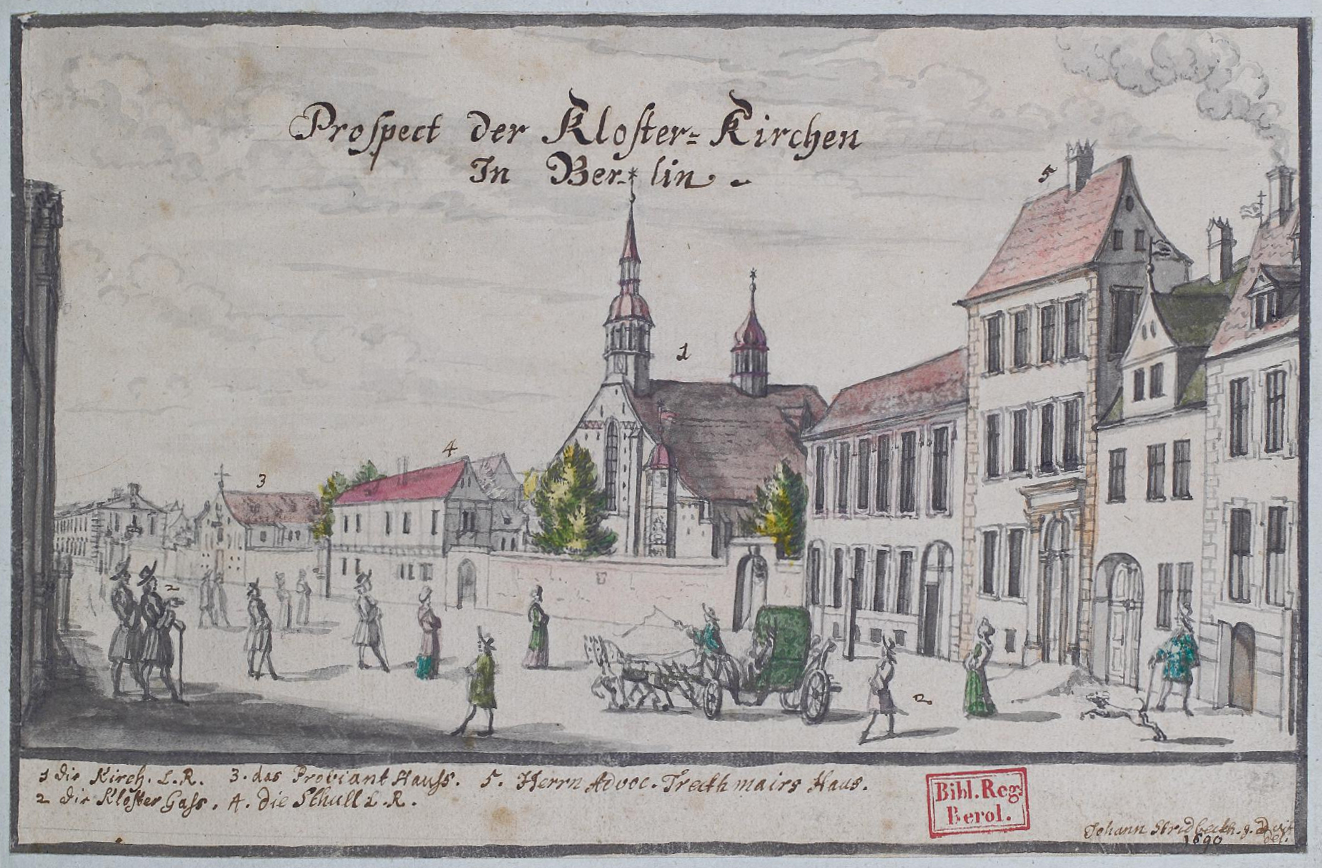
- Watercolour of the thirteenth century Franziskaner-Klosterkirche in Berlin in 1690 with the red-roofed Gymnasium zum Grauen Kloster, where Rodigast taught, to the left
- Born: 10 October 1649; Gröben
- Died: 19 March 1708 (aged 58); Berlin
- Education: University of Jena
- Occupations: Theologian; Hymn writer
- Organizations: Berlinisches Gymnasium zum Grauen Kloster
- Known for: "Was Gott tut, das ist wohlgetan"
- Movement: Pietism

Samuel Rodigast (19 October 1649 – 19 March 1708) was a German teacher and hymnwriter. He is remembered as the author of the hymn "Was Gott tut, das ist wohlgetan".

== Life ==
Rodigast was born in Gröben near Jena. After attending the Gymnasium in Weimar, he studied at the University of Jena, where was appointed to an adjunct position in the philosophy faculty in 1676. In 1680 he became vice-rector of the Berlinisches Gymnasium zum Grauen Kloster in Berlin, serving as rector from 1698 until his death. Before becoming rector, he had been offered a professorship in metaphysics and logic in Jena. He is buried in the Franziskaner-Klosterkirche.

== Hymn ==
Rodigast is remembered for the hymn "Was Gott tut, das ist wohlgetan" (What God does, that is done well). He may have written it to console his sick friend, the cantor Severus Gastorius, who may have wished a song for his funeral. Gastorius is supposed to have composed the melody. Scholars disagree on the circumstances surrounding the creation of the song.

It was the favourite hymn of King Frederick William III of Prussia and was sung at his funeral. In Germany, it is number 294 in the Catholic hymnal, and number 372 in the Protestant hymnal. The text is based thematically on Deuteronomy 32:4.

Johann Sebastian Bach used the song in several different cantatas. Three of his cantatas begin with the hymn. His 1724 chorale cantata Was Gott tut, das ist wohlgetan, BWV 99, is based on the complete hymn, with paraphrases of the inner stanzas. In 1726, he composed the cantata Was Gott tut, das ist wohlgetan, BWV 98, beginning with the first stanza. Between 1732 and 1735 he wrote the cantata Was Gott tut, das ist wohlgetan, BWV 100, using all six stanzas unchanged. Bach used single stanzas of the hymn additionally in cantatas BWV 12, BWV 69a, BWV 75 and BWV 144,

In Theodor Fontane's novel Frau Jenny Treibel, Rodigast is mentioned as a devout poet and teacher.

== Sources ==
- Fritz Jonas (1889). "Rodigast, Samuel". Allgemeine Deutsche Biographie (in German). Vol. 29. Leipzig: Duncker & Humblot. p. 25.
- Eduard Emil Koch: Geschichte des Kirchenliedes und Kirchengesanges. 3rd edition., 8 volumes, 1866/76, III, 420 f.
- Handbuch z. EKG II/1, 1957, 209; III/2, 1990, 299 ff.; Sonderband, 1958, 467 ff.
- Reinhold Jauernig, Severus Gastorius, in: Jahrbuch für Liturgik und Hymnologie 8, 1963, 163 ff.
- Siegfried Fornaçon, Werke von Severus Gastorius, in: Jahrbuch für Liturgik und Hymnologie 8, 1963, 165-170
