= Jan van der Crabben =

Belgian singer

Jan van der Crabben (born 1964) is a Belgian baritone singer.

Born in 1964 in Genk, Belgium, van der Crabben studied music at the Etterbeek Academy under the direction of Aquiles Delle Vigne and subsequently at the Royal Conservatory of Brussels. He has performed in Belgium and internationally and has worked such as Pierre Bartholomée, Shalev Ad-El, Andrew Lawrence-King, and Alexander Rahbari. He has recorded multiple CDs of the baroque and classical music of Johann Sebastian Bach, Willem de Fesch, George Frideric Händel, Wolfgang Amadeus Mozart, Franz Schubert, and others.

He has regularly collaborated in the field of historically informed performance with Sigiswald Kuijken's La Petite Bande. In 2005 he appeared with them in a concert of Bach cantatas at the Rheingau Musik Festival in the Eibingen Abbey, together with Siri Thornhill, Petra Noskaiová and Christoph Genz. He recorded in 2000 Bach's four short Missae with Patrick Peire and the Capella Brugensis.

He was awarded prizes for best "Interpretation of a French Song" and best "Contemporary Music" at the 1990 Concours International d'Oratorio et de Lied in Clermont-Ferrand and was a semi-finalist at the 1996 Queen Elisabeth Music Competition in Brussels.
