= Wilke te Brummelstroete =

Dutch mezzo-soprano (born 1968)

Wilke te Brummelstroete (born 1968) is a Dutch mezzo-soprano. She has recorded Bach cantatas with John Eliot Gardiner and appeared as the valkyrie Siegrune in Wagner's Die Walküre at the Bayreuth Festival.

== Career ==
Te Brummelstroete was born in Doetinchem. She studied at the Royal Conservatory of The Hague and made her debut on the opera stage as Dido in Purcell's Dido and Aeneas in 1991. Her roles in Monteverdi operas have included Proserpina in L'Orfeo, Melanto, Minerva and Penelope in Il ritorno d'Ulisse in patria, and Ottavia in L'incoronazione di Poppea. Her parts in Handel operas were Ruggiero in Alcina, Storgè in Jephtha, Tirinto in Imeneo, and both Juno and Ino in Semele, among others. She performed Tamerlano in Vivaldi’s Bajazet and Costanza in Haydn's L'isola disabitata. In romantic music, she has sung in Schumann's Das Paradies und die Peri and appeared as Bizet's Carmen, sang in Verdi's Requiem, and in the oratorios The Kingdom by Elgar, Berlioz’s Les nuits d'été by Berlioz, and Il tramonto by Ottorino Respighi.

She performed at the Netherlands Opera in 1997 in Francis Poulenc's Dialogues des Carmélites. She sang in 1997 the leading part of Turno in the Dutch premiere of Giovanni Bononcini's Il Trionfo di Carnilla as part of the Utrecht Early Music Festival. She appeared as The Neighbour in Stravinsky's Mavra at the Holland Festival in 1997. She was Teseo in Handel's Arianna in Creta at the Göttingen Handel Festival of 1999, conducted by Nicholas McGegan, and Andronico in his Tamerlano. She performed Mother Goose in Stravinsky's The Rake's Progress. Te Brummelstroete has collaborated with Frans Brüggen and the Orchestra of the Eighteenth Century on international tours, performing for example Mozart's Requiem and Beethoven's Ninth Symphony. She performed at the Royal Albert Hall at the BBC Proms of 2005, and has sung at festivals such as the Beijing Festival, the Massachusetts International Festival, and the Sydney Festival, among others. From 2006 to 2010 she appeared at Bayreuth Festival as the valkyrie Siegrune in Wagner's Die Walküre, staged by Tankred Dorst and conducted by Christian Thielemann, alongside Linda Watson as Brünnhilde.

== Recording ==
Te Brummelstroete recorded alto parts in Bach cantatas with John Eliot Gardiner as part of the Bach Cantata Pilgrimage of the Monteverdi Choir. Its Volume I received in 2005 the Gramophone Award Record of the Year (Baroque Vocal). It contains six cantatas in which she sang the alto part, three for the First Sunday after Trinity Sunday, Die Elenden sollen essen, BWV 75, O Ewigkeit, du Donnerwort, BWV 20, and Brich dem Hungrigen dein Brot, BWV 39, and three for the Feast of St. John the Baptist Ihr Menschen, rühmet Gottes Liebe, BWV 167 and Christ unser Herr zum Jordan kam, BWV 7, and Freue dich, erlöste Schar, BWV 30. She recorded Bach's St Matthew Passion with Frans Brüggen, and Peter Dijkstra, the Regensburger Domspatzen and the Bavarian Radio chorus and orchestra. She also recorded Mozart's Requiem, Maurice Duruflé's Requiem, and Dutch songs.
