= Was Gott tut, das ist wohlgetan, BWV 100 =

Chorale cantata by Johann Sebastian Bach

Was Gott tut, das ist wohlgetan
- BWV 100
- Chorale cantata by J. S. Bach
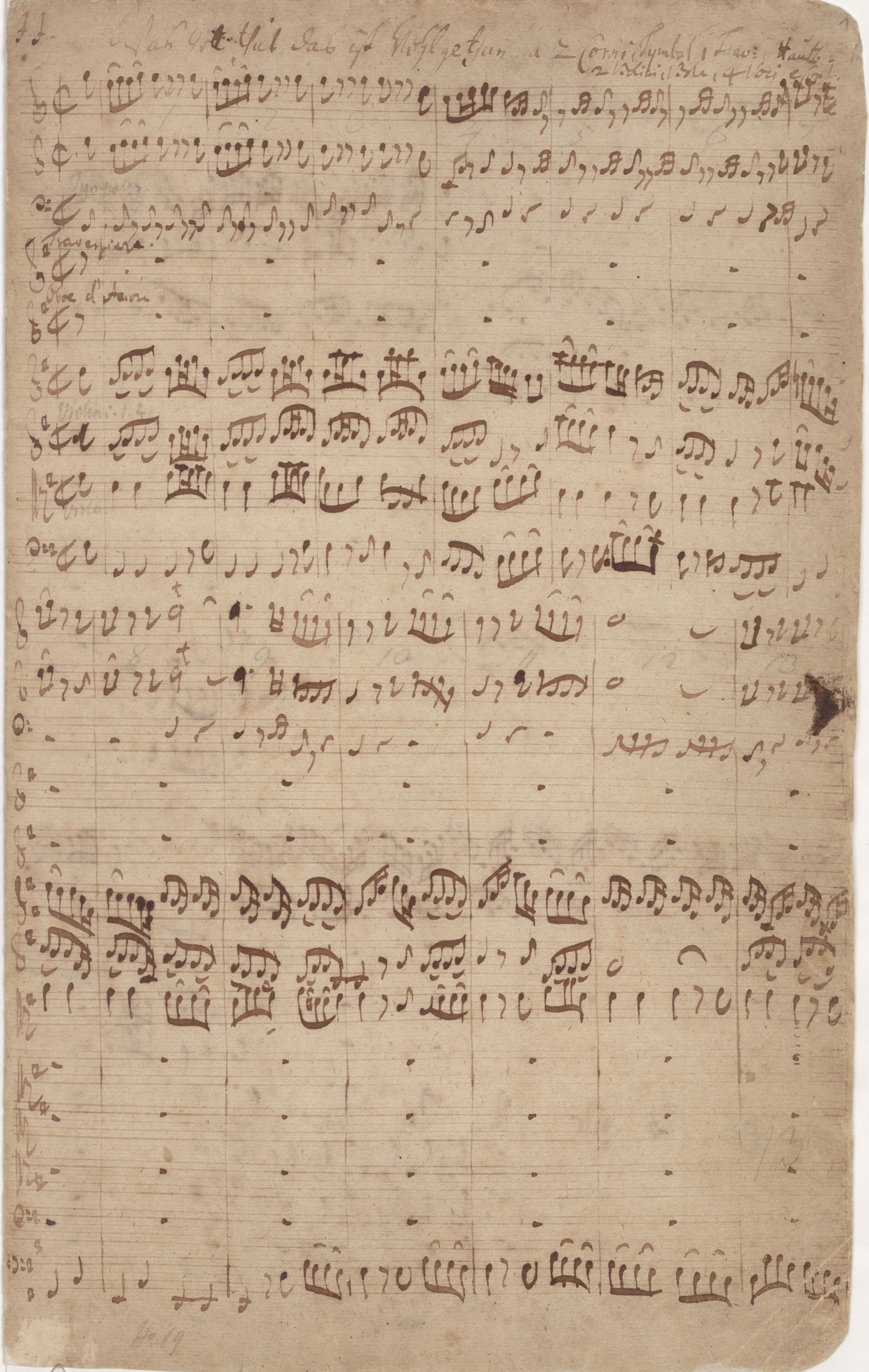
- Autograph manuscript of the first movement of the cantata
- Chorale: "Was Gott tut, das ist wohlgetan" by Samuel Rodigast
- Performed: c. 1734 in Leipzig
- Movements: six
- Vocal: SATB choir and solo
- Instrumental: horn; timpani; flauto traverso; oboe d'amore; 2 violins; viola; continuo

Was Gott tut, das ist wohlgetan (What God does is well done), BWV 100, (Note: "BWV" is Bach-Werke-Verzeichnis, a thematic catalogue of Bach's works.) is a church cantata by Johann Sebastian Bach. He composed it in Leipzig between 1732 and 1735. The chorale cantata is based on the hymn "Was Gott tut, das ist wohlgetan" Samuel Rodigast (1674).

Bach had composed a chorale cantata on the same hymn before as part of his chorale cantata cycle, but in this late work he set the complete hymn text unchanged. He followed the format of the chorale cantatas, framing solo movements with an opening chorale fantasia and a closing chorale. The inner movements are four new arias, the first a duet. For both chorale movements, he reused earlier compositions, expanding their instrumentation for a festive occasion which may have been a wedding.

== History and text ==
This work is a late chorale cantata for an unspecified occasion. Bach likely composed and first performed it in Leipzig around 1734. This is considered one of Bach's latest extant church cantatas.

The cantata is based on the hymn "Was Gott tut, das ist wohlgetan" (1674) by Samuel Rodigast. This chorale was traditionally used in Leipzig as a song for weddings. Bach used the text unchanged, while in most of his earlier chorale cantatas the inner stanzas were paraphrased by a contemporary librettist. Bach followed the format of that cycle by composing the outer movements as a chorale fantasia and a four-part chorale setting, but the inner movements as solo works independent of the chorale tune, here a succession of four arias. For the outer movements, he reused earlier compositions from two different cantatas, adding to their orchestration for a festive occasion.

Bach performed the cantata again in 1737 and 1742.

== Scoring and structure ==
Bach structured the cantata in six movements. The first and last are set for choir as a chorale fantasia and a closing chorale. They frame four arias, the first one being a duet. Bach scored the work for four vocal soloists (soprano (S), alto (A), tenor (T) and bass (B)), a four-part choir, and a Baroque instrumental ensemble: two horns (Co), timpani (Ti), flauto traverso (Ft), oboe d'amore (Oa), two violins (Vl), viola (Va), cello (Vc), violone (Vo) and basso continuo (Bc). The duration of the cantata is given as around 25 minutes.

In the following table of the movements, the scoring follows the Neue Bach-Ausgabe. The keys and time signatures are taken from the book by Bach scholar Alfred Dürr, using the symbols for common time (4/4) and alla breve (2/2). The instruments are shown separately for winds and strings, while the continuo, playing throughout, is not shown. As all stanzas begin with "Was Gott tut, das ist wohlgetan", the second lines of the movements are shown.

Movements of Was Gott tut, das ist wohlgetan, BWV 100
| No. | Second line | Text source | Type | Vocal | Winds | Strings | Key | Time |
|---|---|---|---|---|---|---|---|---|
| 1 | Es bleibt gerecht sein Wille | Rodigast | Chorale fantasia | SATB | 2Co Ti Ft Oa | 2Vl Va | G major | cut time |
| 2 | Er wird mich nicht betrügen | Rodigast | Aria (Duetto) | A T | | | D major | common time |
| 3 | Er wird mich wohl bedenken | Rodigast | Aria | S | Ft | | B minor | 6/8 |
| 4 | Er ist mein Licht, mein Leben | Rodigast | Aria | B | | 2Vl Va | G major | common time |
| 5 | Muß ich den Kelch gleich schmecken | Rodigast | Aria | A | Oa | Vc Vo | E minor | 12/8 |
| 6 | Dabei will ich verbleiben | Rodigast | Chorale | SATB | 2Co Ti Ft Ob | 2Vl Va | G major | common time |

== Music ==
Only the first and last movements use the chorale melody, while the inner movements adopt "carefully graduated sound colors". The rising fourth of the chorale melody, however, recurs throughout the cantata.

The first movement draws on Bach's earlier chorale cantata on the same hymn, Was Gott tut, das ist wohlgetan, BWV 99, with added horn and timpani parts. The change in instrumentation makes the mood "celebratory and jovial", in contrast to the intimate atmosphere of the original. The movement opens with a presentation of two instrumental themes, which repeat when the soprano enters with the chorale melody. The instrumental lines are complex compared to the vocal part.

The alto and tenor duet, according to Ludwig Finscher, reflects the "Italian chamber duet (Steffani, Handel) on account of the motet-style arrangement of the text and the imitatory interweaving of the vocal parts". The melody enters in imitative layers based on the ascending-fourth interval. The continuo line is a four-bar mostly scalar motif that repeats in several related keys.

The soprano aria is accompanied by what John Eliot Gardiner terms "the most technically challenging of all Bach's flute obbligati, with its roulades of twenty-four successive demisemiquavers per bar".

The "jaunty" bass aria is accompanied by "lilting" syncopated strings. The "splendid spacious" melody is remarkable for its concluding descending motif. As in the galant style, the accompanying violins play parallel thirds and sixths. The formal structure of the movement is unusual: rather than the conventional final reprise of the A section expected in da capo form, the B section is followed immediately by the closing ritornello.

The alto aria is in 12/8 time and the minor mode, and is accompanied by oboe d'amore and continuo. It focuses on imagery of bitterness. The aria is introduced by a flowing oboe d'amore solo melody.

The closing chorale is similar to the version that appeared twice in Die Elenden sollen essen, BWV 75, the first cantata that Bach performed in his position as Thomaskantor. Compared to the previous work, in this one Bach added horns and timpani for more festivity and for symmetry with the opening movement, and expanded the imitative instrumental entries.

== Recordings ==
- Kantorei St. Jacobi Hamburg / Hamburger Kammerorchester, Heinz Wunderlich. J. S. Bach: Cantatas BWV 100 & BWV 175. Soli Deo Gloria, 1961.
- Münchener Bach-Chor / Münchener Bach-Orchester, Karl Richter. Bach Cantatas Vol. 4 – Sundays after Trinity I. Archiv Produktion, 1977.
- Holland Boys Choir / Netherlands Bach Collegium, Pieter Jan Leusink. Bach Edition Vol. 15 – Cantatas Vol. 8. Brilliant Classics, 2000.
- Monteverdi Choir / English Baroque Soloists, John Eliot Gardiner. Bach Cantatas Vol. 8. Soli Deo Gloria, 2000.
- Amsterdam Baroque Orchestra & Choir, Ton Koopman. J. S. Bach: Complete Cantatas Vol. 21. Antoine Marchand, 2003.
- Bach Collegium Japan / Masaaki Suzuki. J. S. Bach - Cantatas, Vol.54 (BWV 100, 14, 197, 197a). BIS, 2013.
