= Severus Gastorius =

Cantor in Jena, Thuringia

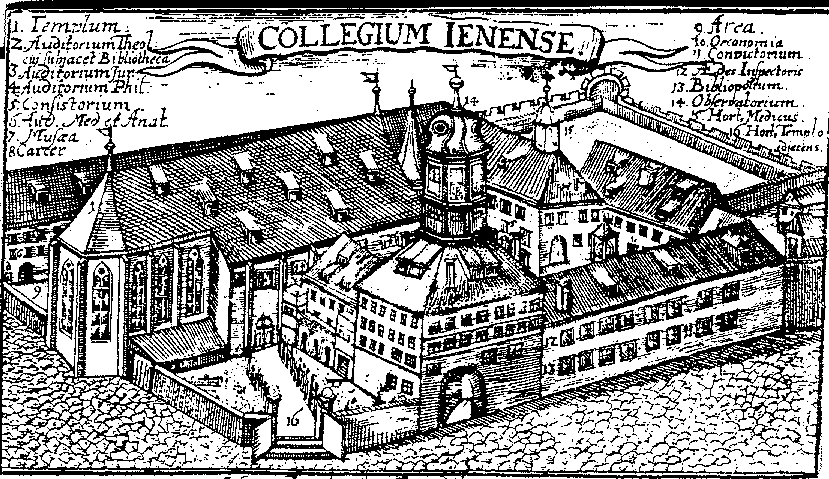
- University of Jena, where Gastorius studied
- Born: 1646; Oettern
- Died: 1682; Jena
- Education: University of Jena
- Occupations: Cantor; Composer
- Known for: "Was Gott tut, das ist wohlgetan"

Severus Gastorius (1646-1682) was a cantor in Jena, Thuringia.

The son of a Weimar school teacher, Severus was born with the family name Bauchspiess (later Latinised to Gastorius) in Oettern, near Weimar. In 1667, he started studying at the University of Jena. From 1670, he deputized for cantor Andreas Zöll in Jena and married his daughter the following year. Gastorius assumed Zöll's position after his death in 1677. One of his friends, Samuel Rodigast, wrote the hymn "Was Gott tut, das ist wohlgetan" for Gastorius when he was sick (to cheer him up as Rodigast writes in his dedication). Even before he recovered, Gastorius set it to music based on a melody by Werner Fabricius. The cantor's students sang it every week at Gastorius' door, on his request, as well as when they returned home. The hymn became widely known in Germany.

Gastorius was buried on 8 May 1682 in Jena's Johanniskirche cemetery. Gastorius had requested that the hymn "Was Gott tut, das ist wohlgetan" be sung at his funeral.

Gastorius is also credited with composing music for the funeral motet Du aber gehe hin bis das Ende komme. It was sung at the funeral of the Jena professor of medicine Johann Arnold Friderici on 2 June 1672.

== Bibliography ==
- Reinhold Jauernig, Severus Gastorius, in: Jahrbuch für Liturgik und Hymnologie 8, 1963, p. 163 et seq. (in German)
- Siegfried Fornaçon, Werke von Severus Gastorius, in: Jahrbuch für Liturgik und Hymnologie 8, 1963, p. 165-171. (in German)
