= Gerlinde Sämann =

German soprano (born 1969)

- Born: 1969 (age 55–56); Nuremberg
- Education: Richard Strauss Conservatory
- Occupation: Classical soprano

Gerlinde Sämann (born 1969) is a German soprano known for her performances in concerts and operas. She is particularly associated with the works of Johann Sebastian Bach. Her concert repertoire also includes lieder, oratorio, early music, and contemporary music.

== Career ==
Born in Nuremberg, Gerlinde Sämann studied the piano and singing at the Richard Strauss Conservatory in Munich with Karl-Heinz Jarius, Henriette Meyer-Ravenstein and Selma Aykan. She also completed a course as a Respiratory therapist according to the method of Ilse Middendorf. In 2000 she received a scholarship from the city of Munich.

In 1999 she performed Poulenc's opera La voix humaine, at the Opernfestspiele Schloß Rheinsberg and in 2000 at the Stadttheater Aachen. She has collaborated with Dresdner Kreuzchor. In the 2002–2003 season Sämann appeared in Pergolesi's Stabat mater at the Theater Neumarkt, Zürich, and also performed in St. Petersburg and Moscow. In 2004 she appeared as Euridice in Gluck's Orfeo ed Euridice at the Rostock opera.

She recorded Bach's St Matthew Passion in 1997 with Horst Meinardus conducting the Philharmonischer Chor Köln, Jörg Dürmüller as the Evangelist and Klaus Mertens as the vox Christi (voice of Jesus).

In the field of historically informed performance, she has worked with the choir Junge Kantorei in Eberbach Abbey in works of Handel, Hercules in 2006, Alexander's Feast and Ode for St. Cecilia's Day in 2008, and Messiah in 2009. She has collaborated regularly with Sigiswald Kuijken and La Petite Bande in concerts and recordings of works of Bach, the soloists also singing the choral parts. She performed the soprano part in Bach's St Matthew Passion and in several of his cantatas, including Wer Dank opfert, der preiset mich, BWV 17, written for the 14th Sunday after Trinity. She recorded Bach's Mass in B minor both with La Petite Bande and with the SebastianChor Munich, conducted by Michaela Prentl. With Prentl, she recorded Bach's St John Passion in 2006, with Hubert Nettinger as the Evangelist, Christa Bonhoff, Thomas Hamberger and Tim Hennis. In 2009 she recorded in Trogen a DVD of Bach's cantata Gloria in excelsis Deo, BWV 191 with Rudolf Lutz conducting the Vokalensemble der Schola Seconda Pratica and tenor Johannes Kaleschke.

In 2010 she performed with the RIAS Kammerchor Monteverdi's Vespro della Beata Vergine at the Rheingau Musik Festival in Eberbach Abbey, with María Cristina Kiehr, James Elliott, Andreas Karasiak, Harry van der Kamp, and the Akademie für Alte Musik Berlin, conducted by Hans-Christoph Rademann.

Since 2010 she has also performed with the early music group VocaMe, focused on works by the 9th century Byzantine composer Kassia.

Gerlinde Sämann is blind.
