= William Towers (countertenor) =

English countertenor

William Towers is an English countertenor. Towers was a choral scholar at Cambridge University, where he read English. He subsequently studied at the Royal Academy of Music.

In 2000 he was a soloist in the Monteverdi Choir's Bach Cantata Pilgrimage, performances which have been released on CD (some on Archiv and others on SDG). He has since appeared in concerts and in operatic productions. His repertoire in opera includes Baroque works and more modern operas such as those of Britten.
