= Knut Schoch =

German opera singer

Knut Schoch is a German tenor in opera and concert as a specialist in the field of historically informed performance, and an academic voice teacher.

== Career ==
Knut Schoch studied voice in Hamburg with Wilfried Jochens and Alan Speer. In 1999, he was awarded at the Concours Musica Antiqua Bruges. In the field of historically informed performance he has collaborated with Thomas Hengelbrock, Ton Koopman, Sigiswald Kuijken and Ludger Remy. He has performed oratorios by George Frideric Handel and the part of the Evangelist in Bach's Passions.

Schoch appeared in Baroque and classical opera, including the title role in Monteverdi's L'Orfeo, Campra's L'Europe galante, Handel's Almira and Alcina, and Mozart's operas Zaide, Die Entführung aus dem Serail and Die Zauberflöte.

Interested in the interplay of music and poetry, he is a performer of Lieder. He has performed with pianists Johannes Debus and Henning Lucius, singing not only songs of the romantic era but also works of Krieger, Beethoven and Britten. He performed Schubert's song cycle Die schöne Müllerin with guitarist Carsten Linck, other songs by Schubert with Eckart Begemann and Ludger Rémy accompanying on the period's Hammerflügel. With pianist Norman Shetler, he sang music by Schubert, Spohr and Schumann.

Schoch appeared at international Festivals such as the Handel festivals in Göttingen and Halle, Bachwoche Ansbach, Rheingau Musik Festival, Schleswig-Holstein Musik Festival and Festival of Flanders.

Schoch has been a teacher for voice, since 1993 at the Hamburg Conservatory, from 1999 to 2002 at the Musikhochschule Hamburg, since 2008 at the Musikhochschule Bremen, at the Akademie für Alte Musik Bremen, and international master classes, for example in Tokyo, Osaka (University of Arts) and the Australian National University.

== Recordings ==
Schoch appears as a frequent soloist in Pieter Jan Leusink's recording of all Bach cantatas with the Holland Boys Choir, including the chorale cantatas Wie schön leuchtet der Morgenstern, BWV 1, Ach Gott, vom Himmel sieh darein, BWV 2, Ach Gott, wie manches Herzeleid, BWV 3, and the funeral cantata Laß, Fürstin, laß noch einen Strahl, BWV 198. He sang on live recordings of the choir Junge Kantorei in Eberbach Abbey, including Bach's Mass in B minor in 2011, to celebrate the 80th birthday of conductor Joachim Carlos Martini, with Miriam Feuersinger, Franz Vitzthum, Klaus Mertens and the Barockorchester Frankfurt. In 2010 they performed Handel's Theodora, in 2009 Handel's Messiah, with Gerlinde Sämann and Peter Kooy, in 2007 Handel's Semele, soloists including Elisabeth Scholl, Annette Markert and Ralf Popken, in 2005 Monteverdi's Marienvesper, with Dorothee Mields, in 2004 Handel's Solomon. A review of Solomon notes: "The tenor Knut Schoch as Zadok is greatly impressive. He has all the technical skill to negotiate his complicated coloratura and sings with great beauty of tone."
