= Paul Esswood =

English countertenor and conductor

- Born: 6 June 1942 (age 84); West Bridgford, UK
- Education: Royal College of Music
- Occupations: Countertenor; Conductor
- Website: www.esswood.co.uk

Paul Lawrence Vincent Esswood (born 6 June 1942) is an English countertenor and conductor. He is best known for his performance of Bach cantatas and the operas of Handel and Monteverdi. Along with his countrymen Alfred Deller and James Bowman, he led the revival of countertenor singing in modern times.

== Life and career ==
Esswood was born in West Bridgford, England. He studied at the Royal College of Music in London from 1961 to 1964 after which he sang in the choir of Westminster Abbey. His professional debut was in a performance of Handel's Messiah for Angel Records, conducted by Charles Mackerras (1967).

Esswood has participated in over 150 recordings, including the alto parts of many Bach cantatas in the complete Teldec series by conductors Nikolaus Harnoncourt and Gustav Leonhardt. He has recorded Messiah four times, as well as extended works by Henry Purcell, Claudio Monteverdi, Francesco Cavalli, Marc-Antoine Charpentier and others. Among the roles in contemporary works written for Esswood are the title role in Akhnaten by Philip Glass and Death in Penderecki's Paradise Lost. He also sang in the premiere of Schnittke's Second Symphony.

Paul Esswood is a co-founder of Pro Cantione Antiqua, an all-male a cappella group specializing in early music. He has also established a reputation as a conductor of Baroque opera. In particular, Esswood has worked extensively in Poland as both a conductor and teacher. In Krakow he has conducted Capella Cracoviensis in works such as Purcell's The Fairy Queen and Vivaldi's Gloria, while in Bydgoszcz he has conducted the Capella Bydgostiensis in works including Handel's Messiah. Other positions Esswood has held in the country include Visiting Professor of Baroque Vocal Music at the Academy of Music in Gdańsk and Chief Conductor of the Polish Orchestra of the XVIII Century.

In 2020 he conducted Lully's Armide for the Warsaw Chamber Opera. In 2023 he helped to inaugurate the Poznań Grand Theatre's artistic season by conducting Handel's Jephtha.

== Recordings ==
- J. S. Bach: St Matthew Passion, with Kurt Equiluz, Karl Ridderbusch, Tom Sutcliffe, James Bowman, Nigel Rogers, Max van Egmond, Michael Schopper, Concentus Musicus Wien, Regensburger Domspatzen, Choir of King's College, Cambridge, conducted by Nikolaus Harnoncourt - 3 CD Teldec (1970).
- Handel: Serse, with Carolyn Watkinson, Barbara Hendricks, Ortrun Wenkel, Anne-Marie Rodde, Ulrik Cold, Ulrich Studer, La Grande Écurie et la Chambre du Roy, conducted by Jean-Claude Malgoire - 3 CD Sony Music (1979).
- Charpentier: David et Jonathas H.490, with Esswood (David), Colette Alliot-Lugaz (Jonathas), Philippe Huttenlocher (Saül), Roger Soyer (Achis), Antoine David (Joabel), René Jacobs (La Pythonisse), Pari Marinov ( L'Ombre de Samuel), choir of the Opéra National de Lyon, Enfants de la Cigale de Lyon et du lycée musical, English Bach Festival Baroque Orchestra, conducted by Michel Corboz - 2 CD Erato (1981).
- Handel: Duets and Cantatas with Maria Zadori sop - Hungaroton 2 LP and CD (1984).
- Philip Glass: Akhenaten featuring Paul Esswood as Akhenaten with The Stuttgart State Opera Orchestra and Chorus world premiere conducted by Dennis Russell Davies - 2 CD CBS/Sony (1987).
