= Sie werden aus Saba alle kommen, BWV 65 =

Church cantata by Johann Sebastian Bach

Sie werden aus Saba alle kommen
- BWV 65
- Church cantata by J. S. Bach
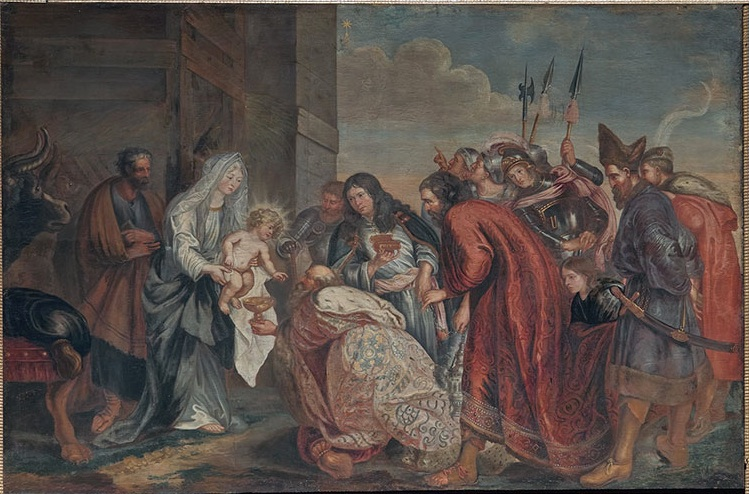
- Michael Angelo Immenraet: Adoration of the Magi at Unionskirche, Idstein, from the 1670s
- Occasion: Epiphany
- Bible text: 1 John 3:8
- Chorale: "Ein Kind geborn zu Bethlehem"; "Ich hab in Gottes Herz und Sinn" by Paul Gerhardt
- Performed: 6 January 1724: Leipzig
- Movements: 7
- Vocal: SATB choir; tenor and bass solo
- Instrumental: 2 horns; 2 recorders; 2 oboes da caccia; 2 violins; viola; continuo

Sie werden aus Saba alle kommen (They will all come forth out of Sheba), BWV 65, is a church cantata by Johann Sebastian Bach. He composed it in 1724 in Leipzig for Epiphany and first performed it on 6 January 1724 as part of his first cantata cycle.

Bach wrote the cantata to conclude his first Christmas season as Thomaskantor in Leipzig which had been celebrated with five cantatas, four of them new compositions, the Magnificat and a new Sanctus. The text by an anonymous author, who possibly supplied texts of two of the Christmas cantatas as well, combines the prescribed readings for the feast day, the prophecy from the Book of Isaiah and the Gospel of Matthew about the Wise Men from the East. The librettist begins with a quotation from the prophecy, comments it by a stanza of the early anonymous Christmas carol "Ein Kind geborn zu Bethlehem", says in a sequence of recitatives and arias that the prophecy was fulfilled in Bethlehem, concluding that the Christian should bring his heart as a gift. The cantata ends with a chorale, stanza 10 of Paul Gerhardt's hymn "Ich hab in Gottes Herz und Sinn".

Bach festively scored the seven-movement cantata, for two vocal soloists (tenor and bass), a four-part choir and a Baroque instrumental ensemble of two horns, two recorders, two oboes da caccia, strings and basso continuo. All recitatives are secco, but the full orchestra plays for the opening chorus, the last aria and the closing chorale.

== History and words ==
Bach wrote the cantata in 1724, in his first year as Thomaskantor (director of church music) in Leipzig, to conclude his first Christmas season on the Feast of Epiphany. For the celebrations on three days of Christmas, New Year's Day and the following Sunday, he had performed five cantatas, four of them new compositions, the Magnificat and a new Sanctus in D major:

- Christen, ätzet diesen Tag, BWV 63

Sanctus in D major, BWV 238
Magnificat in E-flat major, BWV 243a

- Darzu ist erschienen der Sohn Gottes, BWV 40
- Sehet, welch eine Liebe hat uns der Vater erzeiget, BWV 64
- Singet dem Herrn ein neues Lied, BWV 190
- Mein liebster Jesus ist verloren, BWV 154.

The prescribed readings for the feast day were taken from the Book of Isaiah, the heathen will convert (Isaiah 60:1–6), and from the Gospel of Matthew, the Wise Men from the East bringing gifts of gold, myrrh and frankincense to the newborn Jesus (Matthew 2:1–12). The unknown poet of the cantata text may be the same as for BWV 40 and BWV 64 for the Second and Third Day of Christmas, a person "theologically competent and poetically skilfull (sic)", as the Bach scholar Klaus Hofmann writes. The librettist begins with the final verse of the epistle reading, Isaiah's prophecy "all they from Sheba shall come: they shall bring gold and incense". The poet juxtaposes the prediction by a chorale, stanza 4 of the old anonymous Christmas carol "Ein Kind geborn zu Bethlehem" ("Puer natus in Bethlehem", "A babe is born in Bethlehem", 1543), which describes the arrival of the "Kön'ge aus Saba" (Kings from Sheba), related to the epistle. The first recitative proclaims that the gospel is the fulfillment of the prophecy and concludes that it is the Christian's duty to bring his heart as a gift to Jesus. This idea is the theme of the following aria. The second recitative equates the gifts of the contemporary Christian to those of the kings: Faith to the gold, Prayer to the incense, and Patience to the myrrh. The last aria expresses that the devoted Christian offers his heart as a present. The cantata ends with a chorale. The text is not extant, but it is assumed to be stanza 10 of Paul Gerhardt's hymn "Ich hab in Gottes Herz und Sinn".

Bach first performed the cantata for Epiphany on 6 January 1724. In his Christmas Oratorio of 1734, Bach dedicated Part VI, Herr, wenn die stolzen Feinde schnauben, to the topic and the occasion and first performed it on 6 January 1735.

== Music ==
=== Structure and scoring ===
Bach structured the cantata in seven movements. The opening chorus is followed by a chorale, then the two soloists sing a sequence of recitative and aria each, and work closes with a chorale. Bach scored the cantata for two vocal soloists (tenor (T) and bass (B)), a four-part choir and a festive Baroque instrumental ensemble of two horns (Co), two recorders (Fl), two oboes da caccia (Oc), two violins (Vl), viola (Va), and basso continuo. Bach employed a pair of horns before in his Christmas cantata Darzu ist erschienen der Sohn Gottes, BWV 40, and later in his cantata for Christmas 1724, Gelobet seist du, Jesu Christ, BWV 91, and later in Part IV of his Christmas Oratorio. He wrote the title as "J. J. Festo Epiphan: Concerto. à 2 Core du Chasse. 2 Hautb: da Caccia. / due Fiauti 2 Violini è Viola con 4 Voci", which means: "Jesus help (Jesu Juva – a pre-fixed prayer to most of Bach's compositions). Feast of the Epiphany: concerto for 2 hunting horns. 2 oboes da caccia / two recorders 2 violins and viola with 4 voices."

The following table of movements gives the scoring according to the Neue Bach-Ausgabe. The keys and time signatures are taken from the book on all the Bach cantatas by the Bach scholar Alfred Dürr, using the symbol for common time (4/4). The continuo, playing throughout, is not shown.

Movements of Sie werden aus Saba alle kommen, BWV 65
No.	Title	Text	Type	Vocal	Winds	Strings	Key	Time
1	Sie werden aus Saba alle kommen	Isaiah	Chorus	SATB	2Co 2Fl 2Oc	2Vl Va	C major	12/8
2	Die Kön'ge aus Saba kamen dar	anon.	Chorale	SATB	2Fl 2Oc		A minor	3/4
3	Was dort Jesaias vorhergesehn	anon.	Recitative	B				common time
4	Gold aus Ophir ist zu schlecht	anon.	Aria	B	2Oc		E minor	common time
5	Verschmähe nicht, du, meiner Seele Licht	anon.	Recitative	T				common time
6	Nimm mich dir zu eigen hin	anon.	Aria	T	2Co 2Fl 2Oc	2Vl Va	C major	3/8
7	Ei nun, mein Gott, so fall ich dir	Gerhardt	Chorale	SATB	2Co 2Fl 2Oc	2Vl Va	A minor	common time

=== Movements ===
Bach uses scoring and especially instrumentation to illustrate the contrast between poverty and abundance. While all recitatives are secco, and the strings are silent for the first aria which is supported only by the oboes da caccia in low register, a festive orchestra with three kinds of wind instruments and strings accompanies not only, as usual, the opening chorus and the closing chorale, but also the penultimate movement, a tenor aria expressing how the believer gives his heart as a present. Hofmann notes that Bach "combines high art with the folk style".

==== 1 ====
The opening chorus, "Sie werden aus Saba alle kommen" (They will all come forth out of Sheba), depicts, that "alle" (all), not just the wise men, gather and move to adore. Horn signals call first and prevail throughout the movement. Canonical and imitative developments depict the growing of a crowd. The central section is an extended choral fugue, framed by two sections with the voices embedded in a repeat of the instrumental introduction. John Eliot Gardiner remarked in connection with his Bach Cantata Pilgrimage that the instrumentation resembles Near Eastern music, the recorders representing "the high pitches often associated with oriental music and the oboes da caccia (in tenor register) to evoke the shawm-like double-reed instruments (salamiya and zurna) of the Near East".

==== 2 ====
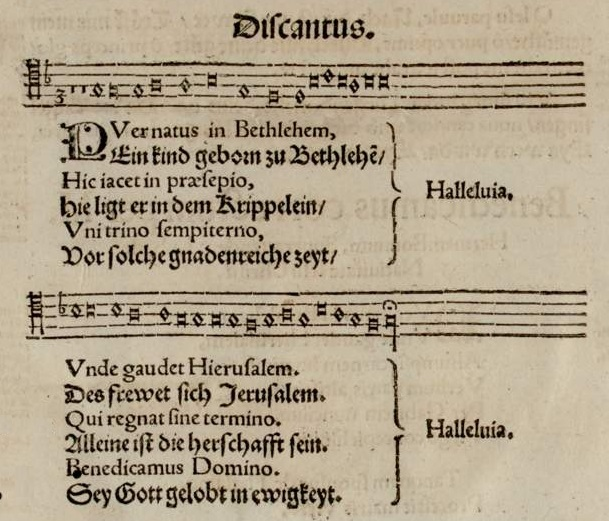
First print of "Puer natus in Bethlehem – Ein Kind geborn zu Bethlehem", published by Lucas Lossius in Nürnberg in 1553

The same idea is rendered in a stanza from the Christmas carol, "Die Kön'ge aus Saba kamen dar" (The kings came out of Sheba), telling of the (unknown number of) Kings from Sheba as mentioned by Isaiah. Its melody, in triple time, is set for four parts.

==== 3 ====
The first recitative, "Was dort Jesaias vorhergesehn, das ist zu Bethlehem geschehn." (What Isaiah prophesied there has happened in Bethlehem.), applies the situation to the individual Christian, who has nothing to offer as a gift but his heart, explained in an arioso ending. The musicologist Julian Mincham notes unexpected harmonies when the stable of Bethlehem is mentioned, as if to illustrate the "lowliness of that birthplace".

==== 4 ====
The first aria, "Gold aus Ophir ist zu schlecht" (Gold from Ophir is too meager), is accompanied by the oboes da caccia, whose low register together with the bass voice conveys the humility expressed in the words. The instruments keep repeating the first motif, recalling the initial idea that gold is not good enough.

==== 5 ====
The tenor recitative, "Verschmähe nicht, du, meiner Seele Licht, mein Herz" (Do not scorn, o You the light of my soul, my heart), begins with a plea, expressed in a line descending through a ninth. It ends on the notion "des größten Reichtums Überfluß mir dermaleinst im Himmel werden" (the abundance of the greatest wealth must some day be mine in Heaven).

==== 6 ====
To show the abundance, the dance-like aria, "Nimm mich dir zu eigen hin" (Take me to Yourself as Your own), is accompanied by all the wind instruments, playing concertante and together. Instead of a conventional da capo aria, Bach creates a bar form by repeating the text of the second idea on new musical material. A long ritornello of 32 measures "contains an almost unprecedented variety of instrumental colouring", as Mincham writes.

==== 7 ====
The closing chorale, "Ei nun, mein Gott, so fall ich dir getrost in deine Hände." (Ah! now, then, my God, I fall confidently into Your hands.), is sung on the melody of "Was mein Gott will, das g'scheh allzeit", which Bach used frequently later, as the base for his chorale cantata BWV 111 and movement 25 of his St Matthew Passion.

== Recordings ==
The entries are taken from the selection on the Bach Cantatas Website. Choirs with one voice per part (OVPP) and instrumental groups playing period instruments in historically informed performances are highlighted green.

Recordings of Sie werden aus Saba alle kommen
Title	Conductor / Choir / Orchestra	Soloists	Label	Year	Choir type	Instr.
Bach Made in Germany Vol. 1 – Cantatas I	Günther Ramin Thomanerchor Gewandhausorchester	Gert Lutze; Johannes Oettel	Fidelio	1952		
Les Grandes Cantates de J. S. Bach Vol. 5	Fritz Werner Heinrich-Schütz-Chor Heilbronn Pforzheim Chamber Orchestra	Helmut Krebs; Franz Kelch	Erato	1952		
J. S. Bach: Cantata BWV 65	Marcel Couraud Stuttgarter Bach-Chor Badische Staatskapelle	Theo Altmeyer; Franz Crass	Philips	1950s?		
J. S. Bach: Cantatas BWV 46 & BWV 65	Helmut Kahlhöfer Kantorei Barmen-Gemarke Barmen Chamber Orchestra	Georg Jelden; Jakob Stämpfli	Cantate	1960		
Bach Cantatas Vol. 1 – Advent and Christmas	Karl Richter Münchener Bach-Chor Münchener Bach-Orchester	Ernst Haefliger; Theo Adam	Archiv Produktion	1967		
J. S. Bach: Das Kantatenwerk • Complete Cantatas • Les Cantates, Folge / Vol. 4	Nikolaus Harnoncourt Tölzer Knabenchor Concentus Musicus Wien	Kurt Equiluz; Ruud van der Meer	Teldec	1977		Period
Die Bach Kantate Vol. 21	Helmuth Rilling Gächinger Kantorei Bach-Collegium Stuttgart	Adalbert Kraus; Wolfgang Schöne	Hänssler	1979		
J. S. Bach: Complete Cantatas Vol. 8	Ton Koopman Amsterdam Baroque Orchestra & Choir	Jörg Dürmüller; Klaus Mertens	Antoine Marchand	1998		Period
Bach – Epiphany Mass	Paul McCreesh Gabrieli Consort & Players	Charles Daniels; Peter Harvey	Archiv Produktion	1998		Period
Bach Cantatas Vol. 18: Weimar/Leipzig/Hamburg / For Christmas Day & for Epiphany / For the 1st Sunday after Epiphany	John Eliot Gardiner Monteverdi Choir English Baroque Soloists	James Gilchrist; Peter Harvey	Soli Deo Gloria	2000		Period
Bach Edition Vol. 19 – Cantatas Vol. 10	Pieter Jan Leusink Holland Boys Choir Netherlands Bach Collegium	Nico van der Meel; Bas Ramselaar	Brilliant Classics	2000		Period
J. S. Bach: Cantatas Vol. 21 – Cantatas from Leipzig 1724 – BWV 65, 81, 83, 190	Masaaki Suzuki Bach Collegium Japan	James Gilchrist; Peter Kooy	BIS	2002		Period
J. S. Bach: Cantatas for the Complete Liturgical Year Vol. 4	Sigiswald Kuijken La Petite Bande	Elisabeth Hermans; Petra Noskaiová; Jan Kobow; Jan van der Crabben	Accent	2006	OVPP	Period

== Sources ==
- Sie werden aus Saba alle kommen, BWV 65: Scores at the International Music Score Library Project
- Sie werden aus Saba alle kommen BWV 65; BC A 27 / Sacred cantata (The Epiphany) Bach Digital
- BWV 65 Sie werden aus Saba alle kommen: English translation, University of Vermont
- BWV 65 Sie werden aus Saba alle kommen: text, scoring, University of Alberta
- Luke Dahn: BWV 65.2, BWV 65.7 bach-chorales.com
