= Ich hab in Gottes Herz und Sinn, BWV 92 =

1725 church cantata by Johann Sebastian Bach

Ich hab in Gottes Herz und Sinn
- BWV 92
- Chorale cantata by J. S. Bach
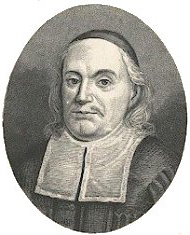
- Paul Gerhardt, author of the chorale text
- Occasion: Septuagesimae
- Chorale: "Ich hab in Gottes Herz und Sinn" by Paul Gerhardt
- Performed: 28 January 1725: Leipzig
- Movements: 9
- Vocal: SATB choir and solo
- Instrumental: 2 oboes d'amore; 2 violins; viola; continuo

Ich hab in Gottes Herz und Sinn (I have given over to God's heart and mind), BWV 92, is a church cantata by Johann Sebastian Bach for use in the Lutheran service. He composed the chorale cantata in Leipzig for Septuagesimae and first performed it on 28 January 1725. It is based on the 1647 hymn "Ich hab in Gottes Herz und Sinn" by Paul Gerhardt, and is the only chorale cantata Bach based on a hymn by Gerhardt. The chorale revolves around faith in God and submission to his will. In nine movements, it is one of Bach's longer cantatas in terms of structure, text and music.

Ich hab in Gottes Herz und Sinn belongs to Bach's chorale cantata cycle, the second cycle during his tenure as Thomaskantor that had begun in 1723. An unknown librettist retained, unusually for the format in this cycle, five stanzas of the chorale with unchanged text and using the hymn tune, in five different settings. Other stanzas were paraphrased into texts for alternating recitatives and arias, and two of the retained stanzas were expanded by explaining text. The cantata is scored for four vocal soloists, a four-part choir, and a Baroque instrumental ensemble of oboes d'amore, strings and basso continuo.

== History, hymn and words ==
When Bach composed the cantata, he was in his second year as Thomaskantor (director of church music) in Leipzig. During his first year—beginning with the first Sunday after Trinity 1723—he had written a cycle of cantatas for the occasions of the liturgical year. In his second year he composed a second annual cycle of cantatas, which consisted exclusively of chorale cantatas, each based on one Lutheran hymn. It included Ich hab in Gottes Herz und Sinn.

Bach composed the cantata for Septuagesima the third Sunday before Lent. The prescribed readings for the Sunday were taken from the 'race for victory' in the First Epistle to the Corinthians (1 Corinthians 9:24–10:5), and the Parable of the Workers in the Vineyard (Matthew 20:1–16). Bach had begun a chorale cantata cycle on the first Sunday after Trinity of 1724. The cantata is based on "Ich hab in Gottes Herz und Sinn", a hymn in twelve stanzas by Paul Gerhardt published in 1647; Gerhardt is regarded as one of the most important Protestant hymnwriters. The chorale is sung to the melody of "Was mein Gott will, das g'scheh allzeit". The hymn is about submitting to God's will and maintaining faith in him.

An unknown poet retained five stanzas unchanged, in contrast to the usual format of the cycle to retain only the two outer stanzas. They are the first stanza for the first movement, the second for the second movement, the fifth stanza for the fourth movement, the tenth stanza for the seventh movement, and the twelfth stanza for the ninth and final movement. The librettist paraphrased ideas from the fourth stanza in the third movement, an aria, used phrases from stanzas 6 and 8 in the fifth movement, a recitative, ideas from the ninth stanza in the sixth movement, and elements from the eleventh stanza in the eighth movement. Additional interpolated recitative text was added to the chorale in the second and seventh movements, but without establishing a reference to the gospel. The additional text for the second movement contains many biblical references, such as to Jonah and the Whale and to Peter the Apostle.

Bach led the Thomanerchor in the first performance of the cantata on 28 January 1725. Bach's manuscript of the score and the parts of that performance are extant.

== Music ==
=== Structure and scoring ===
Bach structured Ich hab in Gottes Herz und Sinn in nine movements. Both the text and melody are retained in five movements, a chorale fantasia, two recitatives, a one-part chorale, and the four-part closing chorale. Bach scored the work for four vocal soloists (soprano (S), alto (A), tenor (T) and bass (B)), a four-part choir, and a Baroque instrumental ensemble of two oboes d'amore (Oa), two violin parts (Vl), one viola part (Va), and basso continuo. The duration of the cantata is given as 33 minutes.

In the following table of the movements, the scoring, keys and time signatures are taken from Alfred Dürr's standard work Die Kantaten von Johann Sebastian Bach. The continuo, which plays throughout, is not shown.

Movements of Ich hab in Gottes Herz und Sinn
No.	Title	Type	Vocal	Winds	Strings	Key	Time
1	Ich habe in Gottes Herz und Sinn	Chorale fantasia	SATB	3Ob	2Vl Va	B minor	common time
2	Es kann mir fehlen nimmermehr!	Chorale and recitative	B			C minor	common time
3	Seht, seht! wie reißt, wie bricht, wie fällt	Aria	T		2Vl Va	B minor	common time
4	Zudem ist Weisheit und Verstand	Chorale	A	2Oa		F-sharp minor	common time
5	Wir wollen uns nicht länger zagen	Recitative	T				common time
6	Das Brausen von den rauhen Winden	Aria	B			D major	3/4
7	Ei nun, mein Gott, so fall ich dir	Chorale and recitative	SATB S A T B				common time
8	Meinem Hirten bleib ich treu	Aria	S	Oa	2Vl Va	D major	3/8
9	Soll ich denn auch des Todes Weg	Chorale	SATB	2Oa	2Vl Va	B minor	common time

=== Movements ===
Klaus Hofmann noted that the choice of chorale is surprising because it has the same tune as the base for the cantata of the previous week in 1725, Was mein Gott will, das g'scheh allzeit, BWV 111. Bach shaped all five movements which cite the chorale in words and music differently. The melody appears in an interesting combination of phrases of different length, two measures alternating with three measures.

==== 1 ====
In the opening chorus, "Ich hab in Gottes Herz und Sinn mein Herz und Sinn ergeben" (I have given over to God's heart and mind my own heart and mind), the soprano sings the melody of the chorale as a cantus firmus in long notes. The vocal parts are embedded in an independent orchestral concerto, in which the oboes d'amore alternate with the strings. The motifs of the lower voices are not taken from the hymn tune, but from the orchestra. The musicologist Julian Mincham noted the movement's "shimmering, translucent beauty, apparent from the very beginning". Sven Hiemke, who published a critical edition for Carus-Verlag, noted that the movement is formally similar to the one on the same tune composed a week earlier, but has different character by a dance-like motif in both instruments and lower voices.

==== 2 ====
In the bass recitative, "Es kann mir fehlen nimmermehr!" (It will never fail me!), the singer switches between rendering the chorale tune and free recitative with elements of dramatic tone painting. John Eliot Gardiner, who conducted the Bach Cantata Pilgrimage in 2000, described the form, of the singer interrupting himself to add thoughts, as an "audacious experiment". The movement begins with a ritornelloderived from the hymn tune, which is used as accompaniment for the chorale phrases. The continuo for the free recitative is often lively, illustrating the text. "mit grausem Knallen die Berge und die Hügel fallen" (with cracking and terrible crashing, the mountains and the hills must fall) is depicted with "very fast downward sequences into the depths – very similar to the depiction of the veil of the temple being torn asunder when Jesus dies" in the St John Passion and the St Matthew Passion.

==== 3 ====
The tenor aria illustrates a dramatic text, "Seht, seht, wie reißt, wie bricht, wie fällt" (See, see, how [it] is torn, how it breaks and falls). The collapse of the "futile world" is illustrated by fast runs in the violins. Hofmann described it as a "truly bizarre contour of the vocal line" and "rhythmically disjointed orchestral writing". Hiemke described the continuo as "for the most part restricted to sixteenth-note arpeggios torn apart by rests".

==== 4 ====
The next chorale stanza, "Zudem ist Weisheit und Verstand bei ihm ohn alle Maßen" (Furthermore, wisdom and understanding is his beyond measure), is sung by the alto to an independent trio of the oboes and the continuo, with only the word "traurig" (sad) rendered by chromatic lines in the oboes. The topic is God's wisdom, "Zeit, Ort und Stund ist ihm bekannt, zu tun und auch zu lassen" (He knows the time, the place, the hour in which to act or not to act).

==== 5 ====
A tenor secco recitative interprets the text "Wir wollen uns nicht länger zagen" (We will no longer despair), in which only the end, "Patience, patience!" is set as an arioso.

==== 6 ====
The bass aria, "Das Brausen von den rauhen Winden macht, daß wir volle Ähren finden" (The roaring of the rough winds helps us find full ears of corn), describes the "howling and raging of the rough winds", an image of the rough situation of a Christian, by "incessant movement" of both the voice and the continuo.

==== 7 ====
In the seventh movement, "Ei nun, mein Gott, so fall ich dir getrost in deine Hände" (Well now, my God, so I settle comforted into your hands), as in the second, the text alternates between the chorale text and free poetry. This time Bach alternates also the voices, the chorale being sung by the choir, to an "animated" continuo, and the recitative by the four soloists in the sequence bass, tenor, alto and soprano. The last line, "und ich kann bei gedämpften Saiten dem Friedensfürst ein neues Lied bereiten" (And, with muted strings, I can prepare a new song for the Prince of Peace), leads to the following aria.

==== 8 ====
The soprano aria expresses: "Meinem Hirten bleib ich treu. Will er mir den Kreuzkelch füllen, ruh ich ganz in seinem Willen" ( remain faithful to my Shepherd. If he fills the cup of suffering for me, I rest completely in his will). is graced with pizzicato strings and no organ chords, to which oboe d'amore and soprano perform a "graceful, dance-like melody and poignant ascending sixths and sevenths". Hiemle pointed at the pastoral music of the oboe, related to the text mentioning "shepherd". John Eliot Gardiner noted that in the "enchanting conclusion" on the words "Amen: Vater, nimm mich an!" (Amen: Father take me up!), "innocence, trust and fragility are all rolled into one".

==== 9 ====
The cantata is closed by a four-part setting of the chorale, "Soll ich den auch des Todes Weg und finstre Straße reisen" (Even if I should journey upon the path of death and on dark highways).

== Manuscripts and publication ==
The cantata's autograph score and the parts have survived. The cantata was first published in 1875 in the first complete edition of Bach's work, the Bach-Gesellschaft Ausgabe. The volume in which the cantata appeared was edited by Wilhelm Rust. In 1956, the cantata was published in the Neue Bach-Ausgabe, the second complete edition of Bach's works, where it was edited by Werner Neumann, with a critical report following in 1995.

== Recordings ==
The selection is taken from the listing on the Bach Cantatas Website. Ensembles playing period instruments in historically informed performances are shown with a green background.

Recordings of Ich hab in Gottes Herz und Sinn
Title	Conductor / Choir / Orchestra	Soloists	Label	Year	Orch. type
Bach Made in Germany Vol. 1 – Cantatas III	Günther Ramin Thomanerchor Gewandhausorchester	Erika Burkhardt; Gerda Schriever; Gert Lutze; Hans Hauptmann	Eterna	1954	
Les Grandes Cantates de J. S. Bach Vol. 17	Fritz Werner Heinrich-Schütz-Chor Heilbronn Württembergisches Kammerorchester Heilbronn	Emiko Iiyama; Barbara Scherler; Theo Altmeyer; Bruce Abel	Erato	1972	
Bach Cantatas Vol. 2 – Easter	Karl Richter Münchener Bach-Chor Münchener Bach-Orchester	Edith Mathis; Trudeliese Schmidt; Peter Schreier; Dietrich Fischer-Dieskau	Archiv Produktion	1974	
J. S. Bach: Das Kantatenwerk • Complete Cantatas • Les Cantates, Folge / Vol. 23	Gustav Leonhardt Knabenchor Hannover Leonhardt-Consort	soloist of the Knabenchor Hannover; Paul Esswood; Kurt Equiluz; Max van Egmond	Teldec	1978	Period
Die Bach Kantate Vol. 26	Helmuth Rilling Gächinger Kantorei Bach-Collegium Stuttgart	Arleen Augér; Gabriele Schreckenbach; Aldo Baldin; Philippe Huttenlocher	Hänssler	1980	
Bach Edition Vol. 5 – Cantatas Vol. 2	Pieter Jan Leusink Holland Boys Choir Netherlands Bach Collegium	Ruth Holton; Sytse Buwalda; Knut Schoch; Bas Ramselaar	Brilliant Classics	1999	Period
Bach Cantatas Vol. 20: Naarden / Southwell / For Septuagesima	John Eliot Gardiner Monteverdi Choir English Baroque Soloists	Miah Persson; Wilke te Brummelstroete; James Oxley; Jonathan Brown	Soli Deo Gloria	2000	Period
J. S. Bach: Complete Cantatas Vol. 13	Ton Koopman Amsterdam Baroque Orchestra & Choir	Deborah York; Franziska Gottwald; Paul Agnew; Klaus Mertens	Antoine Marchand	2000	Period
J. S. Bach: Cantatas Vol. 33 – BWV 41, 92, 130	Masaaki Suzuki Bach Collegium Japan	Yukari Nonoshita; Robin Blaze; Jan Kobow; Dominik Wörner	BIS	2005	Period
J. S. Bach: Kantate BWV 92 Ich hab in Gottes Herz und Sinn	Rudolf Lutz Vocal ensemble of Schola Seconda Pratica Schola Seconda Pratica	Sibylla Rubens; Alexandra Rawohl; Julius Pfeifer; Peter Harvey	Gallus Media	2016	Period
