= Jonas Paulius Lenktaitis =

Lithuanian businessman (1913–2003)

- Born: 17 November [O.S. 4 November] 1913; Juškakaimiai, Russian Empire
- Died: 4 February 2003 (aged 89); Vilnius, Lithuania
- Resting place: Slavikai
- Education: University of Lithuania, University of Tübingen
- Occupations: Businessman, jurist
- Known for: Director of the Lithuanian National Philharmonic Society
- Spouse(s): Stefa Lenktaitienė-Gačionytė, Rita Lenktaitienė-Vileišytė

Jonas Paulius Lenktaitis (17 November [O.S. 4 November] 1913 – 4 February 2003) was a Lithuanian jurist, businessman, and director of the Lithuanian National Philharmonic Society. Lenktaitis's publishing house Patria published multiple authors such as Adolfas Šapoka, Antanas Škėma, Alfonsas Nyka-Niliūnas, Kazys Bradūnas, Vaclovas Biržiška, Jonas Mekas, and others.

== Biography ==
=== Early life and career ===
Jonas Paulius Lenktaitis was born on 17 November [O.S. 4 November] 1913 in the village of Juškakaimiai, then part of the Russian Empire. Lenktaitis's first writings for the press were written in 1928. Lenktaitis studied economy and law at the University of Lithuania, taking a keen interest in international customs. As a student, Lenktaitis actively participated in the activities of the Neo-Lithuania student corporation. In 1934, along with conductor Antanas Makačinas, Lenktaitis established the Vincas Kudirka Symphony Orchestra. In 1935 or 1936, he became a member of the Lithuanian Union of Journalists and wrote actively for the press. From 1939 to 1940 Lenktaitis published Kultuvas (a weekly satire newspaper) and Muzikos barai (a magazine) in Vilnius. In 1939 Lenktaitis, together with architect Vytautas Landsbergis-Žemkalnis and conductor Balys Dvarionas, established the Vilnius City Symphony Orchestra. That same year he established the Patria publishing house.

=== World War II ===
In 1940, after the Soviet occupation of Lithuania, the Council of Peoples' Commissars of the Lithuanian SSR made Lenktaitis responsible for creating the administration of the Vilnius State Philharmony. Lenktaitis's official job was administrating concerts. After the June Uprising in 1941, Juozas Ambrazevičius, the Minister of Education of the provisional Lithuanian government, ordered Lenktaitis to save the Philharmony from possible closure. In 1942, with the help of Pranas Germantas and the mayor of Vilnius colonel Karolis Dabulevičius, the Vilnius State Philharmonic Opera was established. Lenktaitis and his wife, a chorister of the Philharmony, would invite and treat German officers to remain in favor. However, for refusing to recruit young Lithuanians to join the German army, Lenktaitis was arrested by the Gestapo on 15 March 1943 and sent to Stutthof concentration camp.

Patria was nationalized by the Soviet government in 1940, and its fate during the Second World War is not clear. Lenktaitis may have gained access to the Patria in 1943, but could not publish books. Alternatively, it may have illegally published books from 1942 to 1944.

=== Emigration ===
Lenktaitis was released from the concentration camp after forty days, possibly due to his business connections. Lenktaitis then moved to West Germany, where he re-established the Patria publishing house. It was the most productive Lithuanian émigré publisher of the time. In 1946, along with poet Bernardas Brazdžionis, Lenktaitis also re-established the Society of Lithuanian Writers in Exile. Lenktaitis continued studying law at the University of Tübingen.

In 1951 Lenktaitis immigrated to the United States. After contacting a radio station belonging to The New York Times, Lenktaitis and Robert Sherman prepared shows about Lithuania, its history, and often broadcast the works of Mikalojus Konstantinas Čiurlionis, Juozas Gruodis, among others. The shows were prepared from 1972 until 1993. In 1956 Lenktaitis graduated from the New York School of Radio Engineering. He also studied Anglo-Saxon law in Chicago, graduating in 1972 with a PhD. As Lithuanian émigré, Lenktaitis was a creator and active member of a literary club named after Juozas Tumas-Vaižgantas. Additionally, Lenktaitis headed two film distribution companies he established — Intercontinental Pictures, Ltd and Amropa Pictures, Ltd. Moreover, Lenktaitis managed a printing technology corporation, and briefly acted in a movie entitled Home of the Braves.

=== Later years ===
In 2002, President Valdas Adamkus awarded Lenktaitis the Order of the Lithuanian Grand Duke Gediminas, Officer's Cross. Lenktaitis could speak German, English, Polish, Russian, and Czech. Lenktaitis died on 4 February 2003 in Vilnius. He was buried in Slavikai.
