= Hanns-Martin Schneidt =

German conductor, organist and university professor

- Born: 6 December 1930; Kitzingen, Germany
- Died: 28 May 2018 (aged 87) near Munich, Germany
- Education: Thomanerchor; Musikhochschule München
- Occupations: Orchestral and choral conductor; Organist and harpsichordist; Academic
- Organizations: Kirchenmusikschule in Berlin; Sinfonieorchester Wuppertal; Musikhochschule Hamburg; Münchener Bach-Chor; Musikhochschule München; Kanagawa Philharmonic Orchestra

Hanns-Martin Schneidt (6 December 1930 – 28 May 2018) was a German conductor, harpsichordist, organist and academic. He held teaching positions in Berlin, Hamburg, Munich and Tokyo, was Generalmusikdirektor in Wuppertal, artistic director of the Münchener Bach-Chor and the Kanagawa Philharmonic Orchestra, and founded Bach ensembles in Berlin and Tokyo.

== Career ==
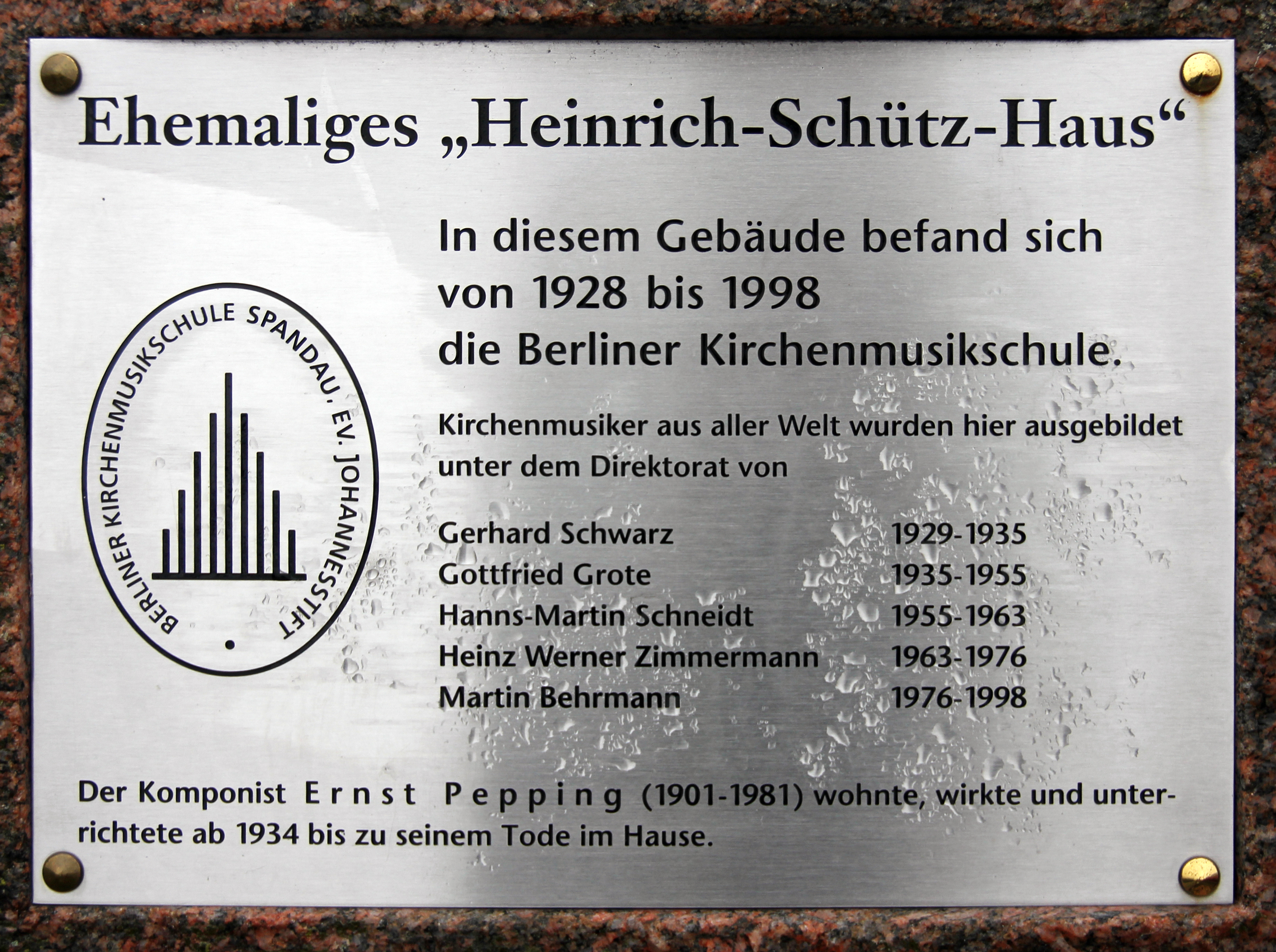
Plaque at the Janusz-Korczak-Haus in Berlin

Born in Kitzingen, Schneidt grew up in Leipzig in the family of a pastor. He became a member of the Thomanerchor in 1940 under Thomaskantor Günther Ramin at age 10. He studied at the Musikhochschule München from 1949 to 1952. While he studied, he began to work as the church musician at the Erlöserkirche in Munich. In 1954, he received the Richard-Strauss-Preis of Munich.

In 1955, he was appointed director of the Kirchenmusikschule in Berlin, at age 25. He founded in 1961 the Bach-Chor and Bach-Collegium at the Kaiser-Wilhelm-Gedächtniskirche for regular performances of Bach cantatas, and conducted the groups to 1963. He was professor at the Musikhochschule Hamburg from 1971 to 1978. He was also, from 1963 to 1985 Generalmusikdirektor of the Sinfonieorchester Wuppertal, including the opera. In 1984, he became the successor of Karl Richter as artistic director of the Münchener Bach-Chor. In 1985 he was appointed professor of orchestral conducting and church music at the Musikhochschule München. He left the Münchener Bach-Chor in 2001 at age 70, but kept conducting Bach groups that he had founded in Tokyo. From 2001, he was professor at the Tokyo National University of Fine Arts and Music, and artistic director of the Kanagawa Philharmonic Orchestra, based in Yokohama, from 2007 to 2009.

Schneidt worked with several German symphony orchestras, such as the Berliner Philharmoniker, the Münchner Philharmoniker and the Rundfunk-Sinfonieorchester Berlin (RSB), and with Chor und Orchester des Bayerischen Rundfunks.

He died near Munich on 28 May 2018.

== Selected recordings ==
- Camille Sain-Saëns, Piano concerto n°5, Mūza Rubackyté piano, the Lithuanian National Philharmonic Orchestra, conducted by Hanns-Martin Schneidt (and Piano concerto n°2 conducted by Alain Pâris). Live record. CD Doron music 2014

== Awards ==
Schneidt was awarded the Eduard von der Heydt Prize of Wuppertal, in recognition of his shaping of the town's musical life over many years, without routine but transparency for the musical work of art at hand, in a broad repertory. He received the Bavarian Order of Merit in 2001.
