= Lithuanian National Philharmonic Society =

Lithuanian orchestra

- Orchestra
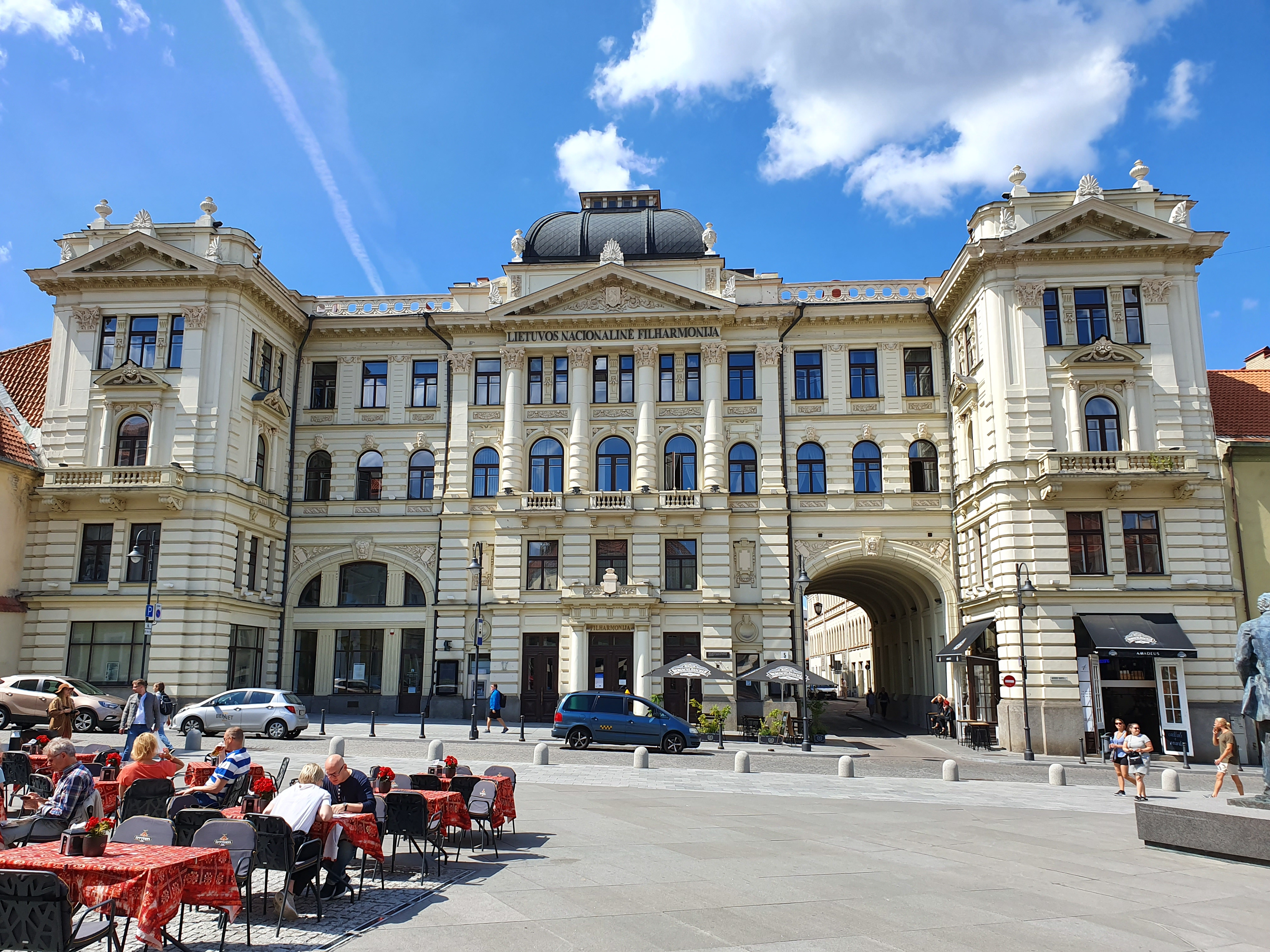
- Headquarters of the Lithuanian National Philharmonic Society
- Founded: 1940; 85 years ago
- Location: Vilnius, Lithuania
- Concert hall: Lithuanian National Philharmonic
- Principal conductor: Rūta Prusevičienė
- Website: www.filharmonija.lt

Lithuanian National Philharmonic Society (Lithuanian: Lietuvos nacionalinė filharmonija) also known by its abbreviation LNPS, is a national cultural institution and the largest and oldest state-owned concert organisation in Lithuania headquartered in the nations capital of Vilnius. The philharmonic specialises in a diverse range of music types including jazz, contemporary and classical, organising regular tours throughout Lithuania and Europe.

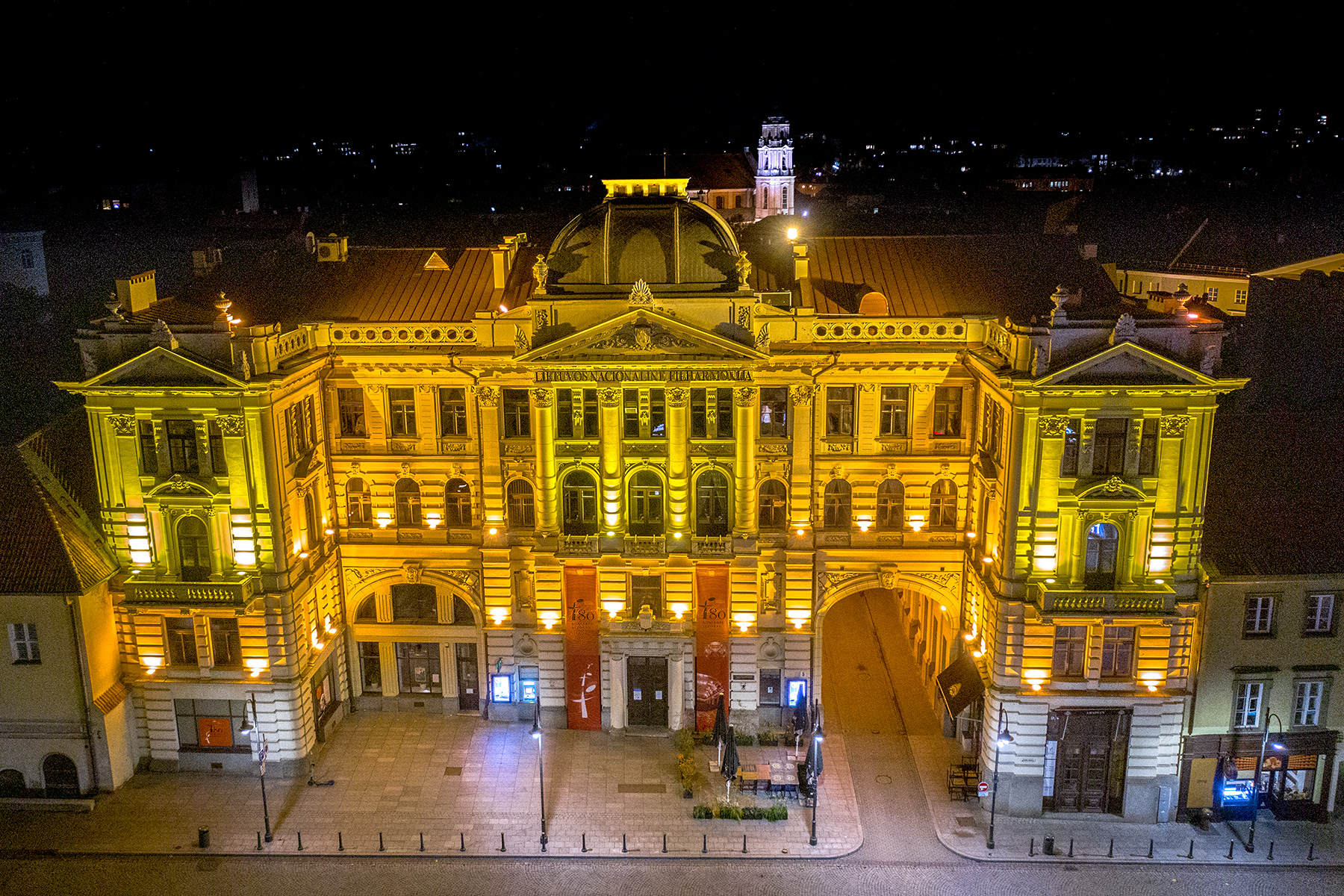
Aerial view (2020)

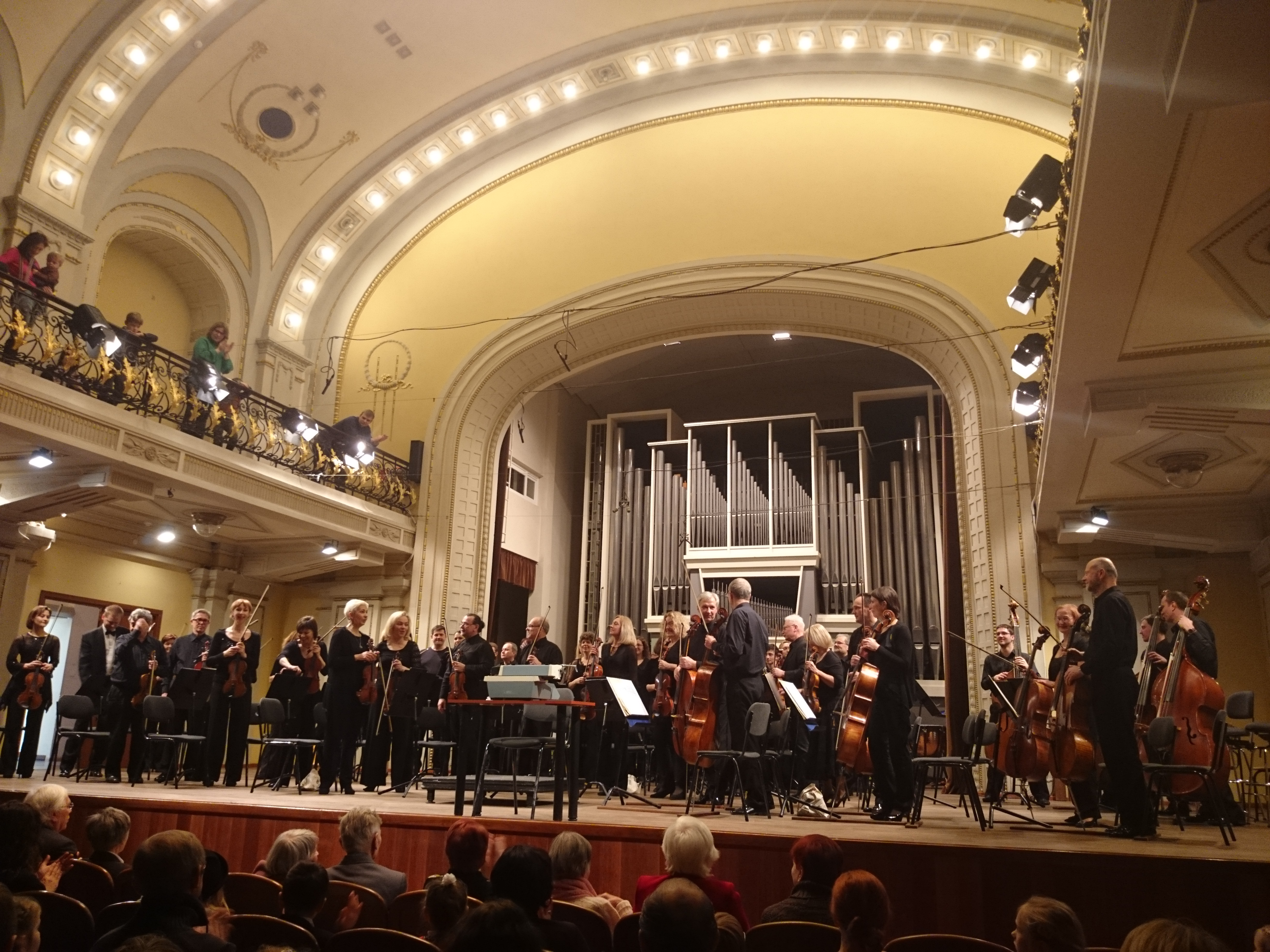
Interior during performance

== History ==
The current building of the Philharmonic Society was built in 1899–1902 and it was intended to be a theater. In 1940, a State Philharmonic was established and it has operated continuously since then with the exception of 1943. The society was designated a national cultural institution in July 1998.

== Activities ==
Currently, the society organizes festivals in Lithuania, including the Vilnius Festival, Nakties Serenados (Night Serenades) in Palanga, and the Kuršių Nerija in Neringa, along with concert series in Nida, Juodkrantė, and Palanga. Among the musical agencies it works with are the Lithuanian National Symphony Orchestra, the M.K. Čiurlionis String Quartet, the Vilnius String Quartet, and chamber music. Its international activities include the sponsorship of concerts abroad and those of visiting musicians and orchestras, music exchange programs, and membership in EFA (European Festivals Association), ISPA (International Society of Performing Arts), Nordic-Baltic Association of State Concert Institutions, and PEARLE (European League of the Performing Arts Employers' Association).

The Society's headquarters are a historic building in Vilnius Old Town, which previously was used to hold the Great Seimas of Vilnius in 1905. Performances are held in its Concert Hall and Chamber Hall.

== Selected recordings ==
- Camille Sain-Saëns, Piano concerto n°5, Mūza Rubackyté piano, the Lithuanian National Philharmonic Orchestra, conducted by Hanns Martin Schneidt and Piano concerto n°2 (conducted by Alain Pâris). Live record. CD Doron music 2014
