= Puer natus in Bethlehem =

Christmas hymn

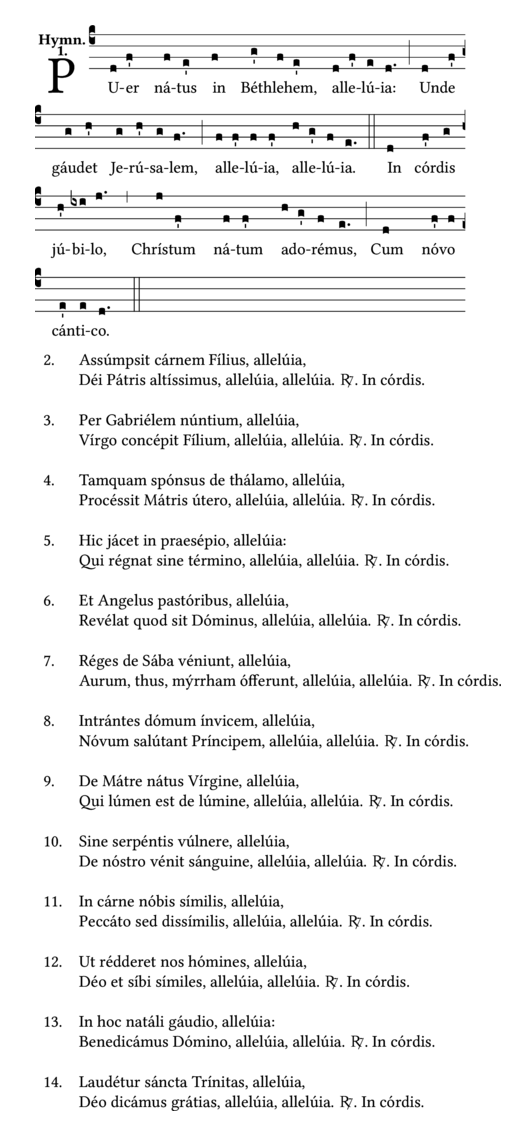
Notes of "Puer natus in Bethlehem"

"Puer natus in Bethlehem" (A child is born in Bethlehem) is a medieval Latin Christmas hymn. The thirteenth-century text is traditionally associated with a fourteenth-century tune of the same name.

== Lyrics ==
Lyric translation by Hamilton Montgomerie MacGill, 1876

Puer natus in Bethlehem, Alleluia.
Unde gaudet Jerusalem. Alleluia.

Hic jacet in præsepio, Alleluia.
Qui regnat sine termino. Alleluia.

Cognovit bos et asinus, Alleluia.
Quod puer erat Dominus. Alleluia.

Reges de Sabâ veniunt, Alleluia.
Aurum, thus, myrrham offerunt. Alleluia.

Intrantes domum invicem, Alleluia.
Novum salutant principem. Alleluia.

De matre natus virgine, Alleluia.
Sine virili semine; Alleluia.

Sine serpentis vulnere, Alleluia.
De nostro venit sanguine; Alleluia.

In carne nobis similis, Alleluia.
Peccato sed dissimilis; Alleluia.

Ut redderet nos homines, Alleluia.
Deo et sibi similes. Alleluia.

In hoc natali gaudio, Alleluia.
Benedicamus Domino: Alleluia.

Laudetur sancta Trinitas, Alleluia.
Deo dicamus gratias. Alleluia.

A Child is born in Bethlehem;
Exult for joy, Jerusalem!

There, in a manger lowly, lies.
He who reigns above the skies.

The ox and ass in neighbouring stall.
See in that Child the Lord of all.

And kingly pilgrims, long foretold.
From East bring incense, myrrh, and gold,

And enter with their offerings.
To hail the new-born King of Kings.

He comes, a maiden mother's Son.
Yet earthly father hath He none;

And, from the serpent's poison free.
He owned our blood and pedigree.

Our feeble flesh and His the same.
Our sinless kinsman He became,

That we, from deadly thrall set free.
Like Him, and so like God, should be.

Come then, and on this natal day.
Rejoice before the Lord and pray.

And to the Holy One in Three.
Give praise and thanks eternally.

== Ein Kind geborn zu Bethlehem ==
Ein Kind geborn zu Bethlehem

"Ein Kind geborn zu Bethlehem" is Cyriakus Spangenberg's 1545 translation of "Puer natus in Bethlehem". The tune associated with his German translation, Zahn No. 192b, was published by Lucas Lossius in 1553 and is also known as "Puer natus in Bethlehem". The text and tune of this Lutheran hymn were included by Johann Sebastian Bach in the second movement of his church cantata Sie werden aus Saba alle kommen, BWV 65. In addition, Bach's chorale prelude (for organ) "Puer natus in Bethlehem", BWV 603, included in the Orgelbüchlein, is based on the same hymn tune.

An older form of the hymn tune, Zahn 192a, was not only used for the Latin and German versions of the hymn, but also, for instance, for Luther's "Vom Himmel kam der Engel Schar" hymn text. Bach's chorale prelude based on that tune, BWV 607, is also included in the Orgelbüchlein.
