= Marylène Dosse =

American classical pianist

Marylène Dosse is a French-born American classical pianist.

== Biography ==
Marylene Dosse was born in Domfront in Normandy, France - the only place in which her mother could find a hospital which had not been taken over by the invading German armed forces.

She entered the Paris Conservatoire where she studied initially under Jean Batalla and took supplementary lessons in piano and chamber music with Jacques Février. Later she studied with Jeanne-Marie Darré, who took over Batalla's advanced piano class. In 1960 she won first prize at the Conservatoire. After winning prizes in competitions in Salzburg and Naples, she began on an extensive concert career. She also participated in master classes given by Alfred Brendel, Jörg Demus and Paul Badura-Skoda. When Badura-Skoda was offered a position as artist-in-residence at the University of Wisconsin, he invited her to come as his assistant. She subsequently became artist-in-residence for a group of seven campuses of the University of Wisconsin, and married William R Peters, one of the deans of the university. She became a US citizen.

== Repertoire and recordings ==
She was approached by George de Mendelssohn, the president of Vox Records, and began an extensive series of recordings of French and Spanish piano works, including the complete solo piano works of Granados, which was Critics' Choice of the month in High Fidelity magazine, and Saint-Saëns as well as numerous neglected works for piano and orchestra.

She is the pianist of the Castalia Trio, together with violinist James Lyon and cellist Kim Cook. She also appears in violin and piano duo recitals with the violinist Marianne Behrendt.

Reviewing a 1979 recital, Nancy Malitz, the music critic of the Cincinnati Enquirer described Dosse as "an outstanding musician with a structural and rhythmic grasp of music that one finds in the finest conductors. Dosse is also a superb pianist with technical and tonal resources to spare."

== Academic career ==
Dosse has been a guest faculty member of Indiana University-Bloomington and artist-in-residence at the University of Wisconsin. In 1986 she was appointed a distinguished Professor at the Pennsylvania State University. In 1992 she was the only woman elected to the Institute of the Arts and Humanistic Studies, and in 1999 the university awarded her the Faculty Medal for Outstanding achievement in the Arts and Humanities. She is now a professor emerita residing in Albuquerque, New Mexico. /

== Recordings ==
- Claude Debussy: Fantaisie for piano and orchestra (with the Orchestra of Radio Luxembourg Louis de Froment, conductor) Candide CE31069
- Charles Gounod: Fantasy on the Russian Anthem (with the Westphalian Symphony Orchestra, Siegfried Landau, conductor) Candide QCE 31088
- Enrique Granados: Complete Piano Works, Vox Productions (6LP; 4CD)
- Édouard Lalo: Piano concerto (with the Stuttgart Philharmonic Matthias Kuntzsch, conductor) Candice QCE 31102
- Jules Massenet: Piano concerto (with the Westphalian Symphony Orchestra; Siegfried Landau, conductor) Candide QCE 31088
- Felix Mendelssohn: Concerto for violin and piano (with Susanne Lautenbacher, violin, and the Württemberg Chamber Orchestra, Jörg Faerber, conductor) Turnabout QTV-S 34662
- Franz Xaver Mozart: Piano concerto op. 14 (with the Lübeck Orchestra ProMusica; Matthias Kuntzsch, conductor) Turnabout QTV 34686
- Gabriel Pierné: Piano concerto (with the Stuttgart Philharmonic Matthias Kuntzsch, conductor) Candice QCE 31102
- Camille Saint-Saëns: Complete Solo Piano Works. 5 CD Vox 2003
- Camille Saint-Saëns: "Africa" for piano and orchestra (with the Orchestra of Radio Luxembourg Louis de Froment, conductor) Candide QCE 31088

Piano duo recordings

- Emmanuel Chabrier: Three romantic Waltzes for two pianos (with Annie Petit). Turnabout TV-S 34586
- Norman Dello Joio: Complete music for piano duo (with Debra Tork). Albany Records. Troy 468
- Camille Saint-Saëns: The Carnival of the Animals (with Annie Petit). Turnabout TV-S 34586
- Déodat de Séverac: "The Tin Soldier" for four hands (with Annie Petit). Turnabout TV-S 34586
- French music for piano duo. Works by Bizet, Chabrier, Fauré, Lalo, d'Indy, Massenet, Caplet, Ravel, Debussy, Satie, Schmitt, Séverac and Poulenc (with Annie Petit) 2 volumes: Vol 1 Pantheon D10699, Vol 2 Pantheon D23677.

Chamber music

- Johannes Brahms: Piano trio in B major (with the Castalia Trio). SKVRNA SA0046 2131
- Louise Farrenc: Sonata, Op. 39
- Maurice Ravel Piano trio (with the Castalia Trio). SKVRNA SA0046 2131
- Pauline Viardot: Six Pieces, Sonatine in A minor

== Sources ==
- Timbrell, Charles. French Pianism: A Historical Perspective. Amadeus Press; 2 edition (March 1, 2003). ISBN 1-57467-045-X; ISBN 978-1-57467-045-5
