= Alain Pâris =

French conductor and musicologist

Alain Pâris (born 22 November 1947) is a French conductor and musicologist.

== Biography ==
Born in Paris, Alain Pâris was trained as a pianist and has a law degree. He studied conducting with Pierre Dervaux, Paul Paray and Georg Solti and won the First prize at the International Besançon Competition for Young Conductors in 1968. For thirty-seven years, he was the youngest winner before Lionel Bringuier took his place.

An assistant to Michel Plasson at the Capitole de Toulouse, he was principal conductor at the Opéra du Rhin (1983–1987) and professor of conducting at the conservatoire de Strasbourg (1986–89). He conducts most of the major French orchestras (Orchestre de Paris, Radio France orchestras, Lyon, Strasbourg, Lille...) and develops an international career, notably as a regular guest of the St. Petersburg Capella(1993–1999), the Bilkent Symphony Orchestra in Ankara (1998–2000), the George Enescu Philharmonic Orchestra (1999–2011), the Athens State Orchestra (2002–2004), the Lebanese National Symphony Orchestra (since 2002).

He has been invited to perform in Germany (Dresden and Karlsruhe), Switzerland (bands from French-speaking Switzerland and Italian-speaking Switzerland), Italy, Spain, Portugal, Finland, Russia, Poland, Hungary, Lithuania, Slovenia, Slovakia, Greece, Turkey, Turkey, Lebanon, Egypt, Turkey, Mexico, Argentina (Buenos Aires Teatro Colón), South Africa, China, Hong Kong, Macao, Singapore... a total of 90 orchestras in more than 50 countries.

Sought after for his knowledge of the French repertoire, he also gives masterclasses in all these countries and sits on juries for international competitions. He created or directed the first audition of works by Philippe Chamouard, Hugues Dufourt, Mikołaj Górecki, Iyad Kanaan, Bechara El-Khoury, Bruce Mather, Piotr Moss, Tristan Murail, Jacques Offenbach, Luis de Pablo, Yoshihisa Taïra, Tōru Takemitsu. In addition to his career as a conductor, he was also a producer of musical programs on France Musique and France Culture from 1971 to 2010. Musical director of the Pro Musicis musical season and president of the Pro Musicis competition between 2013 and 2016, he is involved in sharing music with underprivileged audiences. Since 2016, he has been artistic director of the ESA Music Festival in Beirut.

== Discography ==
- Piano Concerto by Jules Massenet, Variations symphoniques and Les Djinns by César Franck, with İdil Biret, piano. Bilkent Symphony Orchestra in Ankara (Alpha)
- Symphony n° 4 by Pierre Wissmer, Hungarian National Philharmonic in Budapest (Intégral then Naxos)
- Concerto for two pianos, K 365 by Mozart, with Roxana and Valentin Gheorghiu, Orchestre National de la Radio Roumaine (Casa Radio)
- Symphony n°7 by Philippe Chamouard, Hungarian National Philharmonic, Budapest, (Éditions Hortus)
- Piano Concerto the "Égyptien" by Camille Saint-Saëns with Muza Rubackyté, Lithuanian National Philharmonic, Vilnius (Doron)
- Concerto valcrosiano and Concerto pour piano n° 2 by Pierre Wissmer with Georges Pludermacher, Hungarian Symphony Orchestra, Budapest (Naxos)
- Symphony n° 6 "La Montagne de l'âme" and Les Rêves de l'ombre by Philippe Chamouard, Transylvania State Philharmonic Orchestra (Triton)
- Symphonie n° 5 "Le Manuscrit des étoiles" and Le Portail céleste by Philippe Chamouard, Orchestre philharmonique de Transylvanie "Mihail Jora" by Bacau (Indésens)

== Publications ==
- Dictionnaire des interprètes et de l'interprétation musicale au XXe (in French). Paris: Éditions Robert Laffont. 2004. p. 1278. ISBN 978-2-2210-8064-1. OCLC 34515574.
- Livrets d'opéra, Robert Laffont, series "Bouquins", Paris, 1991; reissue 2013
- Le Nouveau Dictionnaire des interprètes, Paris, Robert Laffont, series "Bouquins", 2015

=== Adaptations in French ===
- Dictionnaire encyclopédique de la musique established under the direction of Denis Arnold, Robert Laffont, series "Bouquins", Paris, 1988
- Dictionnaire biographique des musiciens by Theodore Baker and Nicolas Slonimsky, Robert Laffont, series "Bouquins", Paris, 1995
- Dictionnaire encyclopédique de la musique de chambre by Walter Willson Cobbett, Robert Laffont, series "Bouquins", Paris, 1999
