= Piano Concerto (Massenet) =

1902 composition by Jules Massenet

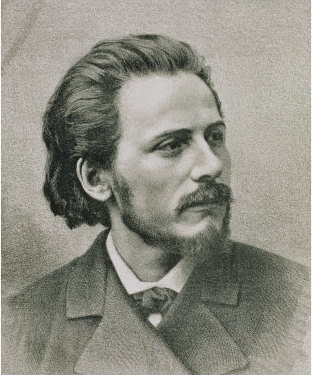
Jules Massenet

Jules Massenet's Piano Concerto is a 1902 work for piano solo and orchestra. It is scored for a typical-sized ensemble of the time.

The world premiere occurred on 1 February 1903 at the Paris Conservatoire. The sixty-year-old Louis Diémer, to whom the work was dedicated, was the soloist for the premiere. After the premiere, it quickly fell into obscurity and is seldom heard today.

A typical performance of the work lasts around 30 minutes.

== Composition ==
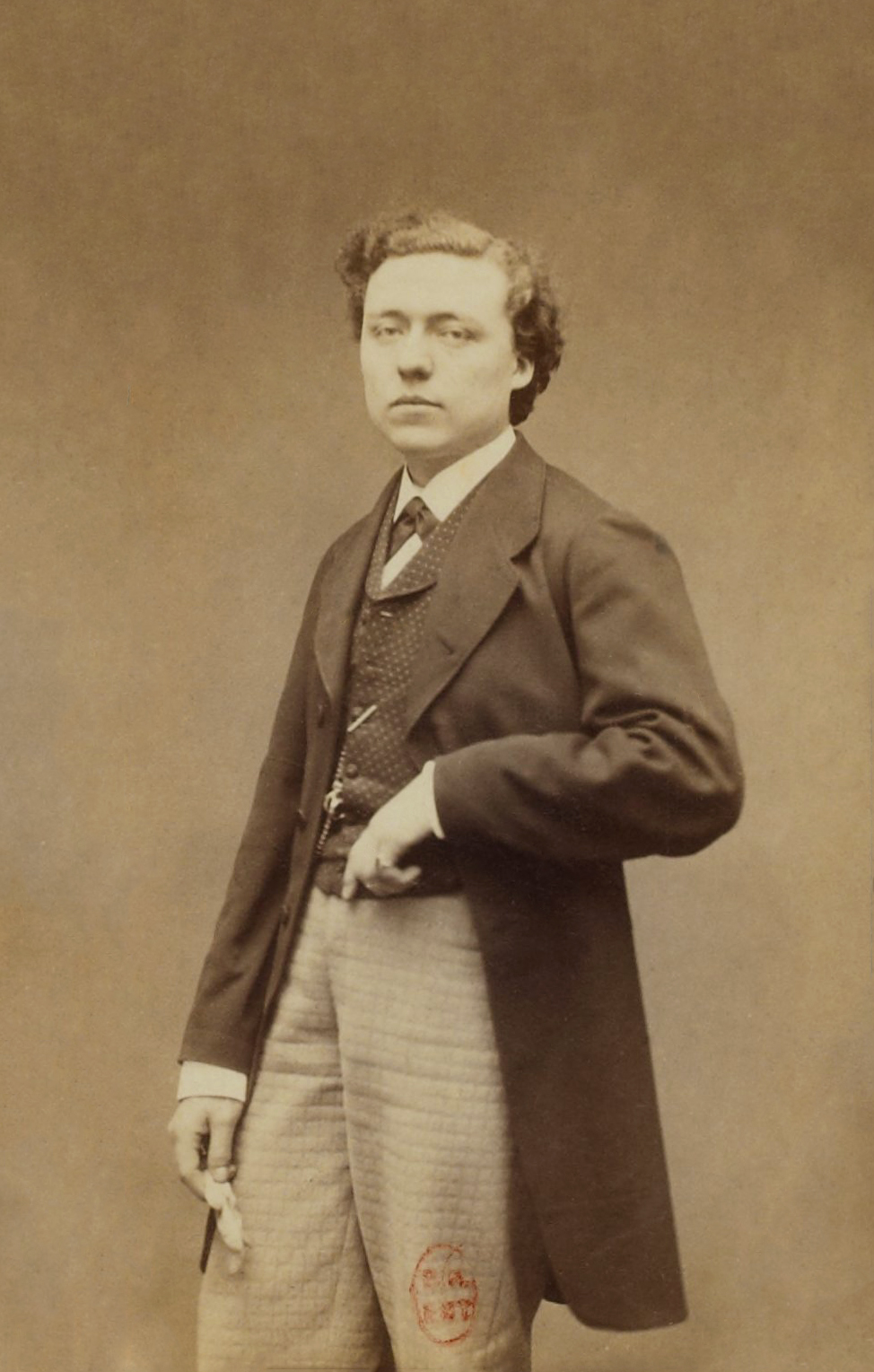
Louis-Joseph Diémer, the dedicatee of this work

In 1863, Massenet won the Prix de Rome as a composer, and moved to Rome. He remarked to his sister, "I am working more at the piano. I’m studying Chopin's Études, but especially Beethoven and Bach as the true musician-pianist". That year, he began sketches for his Piano Concerto.

The work was not completed until 1902, when Massenet was nearing the age of sixty. In a period of three months, Massenet completed the piano concerto.

== Structure ==
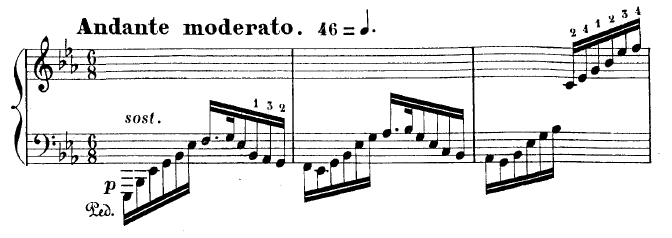
Opening bars of the solo part of the first movement, played over sustained chords in the strings

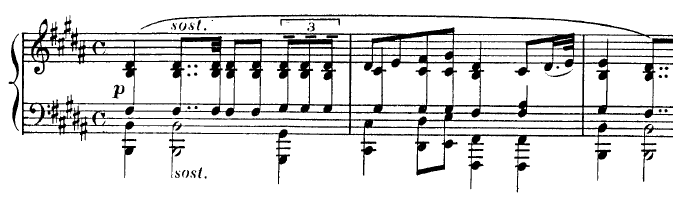
Opening bars of the second movement, played by the soloist alone

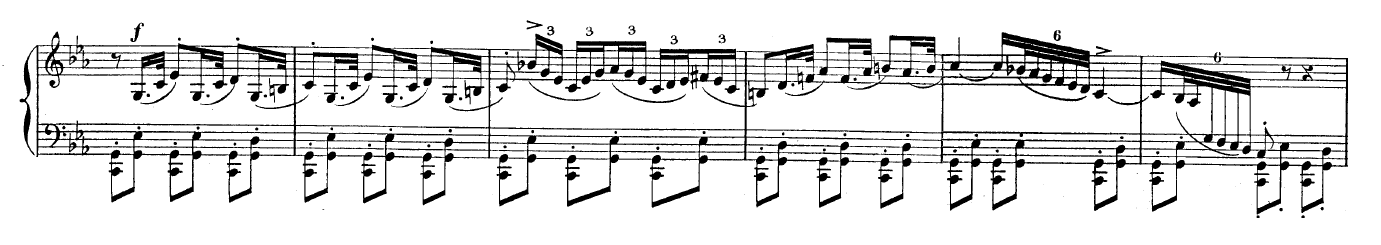
The primary "Airs Slovaques" theme, which provides the rhythmic and melodic impetus for the entire third movement

The concerto is scored for piano solo accompanied by an orchestra of typical size: piccolo, 2 flutes, 2 oboes, 2 clarinets, 2 bassoons, 4 horns, 2 trumpets, 3 trombones, timpani, percussion (in the 3rd movement, including triangle, glockenspiel or celesta, bass drum, and strings.

The work is in the typical three-movement structure.

1. Andante moderato (46 = .) – Allegro non troppo (. = 84). 3/4 time. (14 minutes)
2. Largo. Massenet provides additional remarks here: "Pour le début, = 44 et les passages semblables y compris la fin; puis, dans le courant de ce morceau, varier entre = 60 et = 66 selon le sentiment." (For the beginning, and similar passages till the end, 44 to a quarter note; then, in the rest of this piece, vary the tempo between 60 and 66 to a quarter, according to the feeling). 4/4 time. (9 minutes)
3. "Airs slovaques" Allegro. ( = 116). 3/4 time. (7 minutes)

The first movement begins and ends in E♭ major. It showcases Massenet's operatic side (Massenet was one of the best opera composers in his day). In some ways, it resembles closely Beethoven's Piano Concerto No. 5, especially since both concertos are in the same key, and both have an opening flourish in the piano.

The second movement, in B major, is a slow, deliberate promenade featuring the piano prominently throughout. There are sweeping orchestral flourishes in the middle of this movement. Eventually the music comes to a restful reprise of the theme, and the movement ends quietly in a fading murmur.

The third movement, in C minor, is subtitled "Airs Slovaques", alluding to the ersatz Slovak-like dance tune Massenet uses throughout. The brief 2/4 section towards the end evokes the virtuosic passages of Liszt's Hungarian Rhapsodies, before returning to the main theme, perpetually accelerating into tumbling passages in the piano and flamboyant outbursts in the orchestra. Massenet adds triangle and glockenspiel in this movement to augment the exotic flavor of this movement.

Massenet's piano concerto is one of a handful of works that begins in a major key (E♭ major) and ends in minor (C minor).

== Reception ==
The premiere drew very tepid reviews of both the music and Diémer's execution. The pianist Mark Hambourg remarked on Diémer's playing: "a dry-as-dust player with a hard rattling tone". Thus, there is some speculation that Diémer's playing was to blame for the unpopularity of the concerto.

Furthermore, the concerto was seen as outdated, as Parisian society's tastes had moved away from this salon-style concerto of Massenet.

== Discography ==
A handful of recordings have been made of this concerto.

Soloist	Orchestra	Conductor	Date
Sondra Bianca	Hamburger Kammerorchester	Hans-Jürgen Walther	1955
Adolf Drescher	Hamburger Symphoniker	Walther Richter	1960's
Marylène Dosse	Westphalian Symphony Orchestra	Siegfried Landau	1974
Stephen Coombs	BBC Scottish Symphony Orchestra	Jean-Yves Ossonce	1997
Aldo Ciccolini	Orchestre Philarmonique de Monte Carlo	Sylvain Cambreling	1979
İdil Biret	Bilkent Symphony Orchestra	Alain Pâris	2007

The recording with Stephen Coombs and the BBC Orchestra was released on Volume 15 of "The Romantic Piano Concerto", on the Hyperion label.

The recording with Adolf Drescher and the Hamburger Symphoniker was released on the Summit label in 1978 but recorded at an unknown date prior to the pianists death in 1967.

The recording with Marylène Dosse and the Westphalian Symphony was released in a 2-CD set entitled "French Piano Concertos", featuring this concerto as well as concertos of Lalo, Roussel and other French composers.
