= Kanagawa Philharmonic Orchestra =

The Kanagawa Philharmonic Orchestra (神奈川フィルハーモニー管弦楽団, Kanagawa Firuhāmonī Kangen Gakudan) is a symphony orchestra based in Yokohama, Kanagawa Prefecture, Japan. Founded in 1970.

== Music directors ==
- Hanns-Martin Schneidt (2007–2009)
- Yuzo Toyama (1992–1996)
- Kazuo Yamada (1991)
- Kentaro Kawase (2014–present)
