= Was mein Gott will, das g'scheh allzeit, BWV 111 =

1725 cantata by Johann Sebastian Bach

Was mein Gott will, das g'scheh allzeit
- BWV 111
- Chorale cantata by J. S. Bach
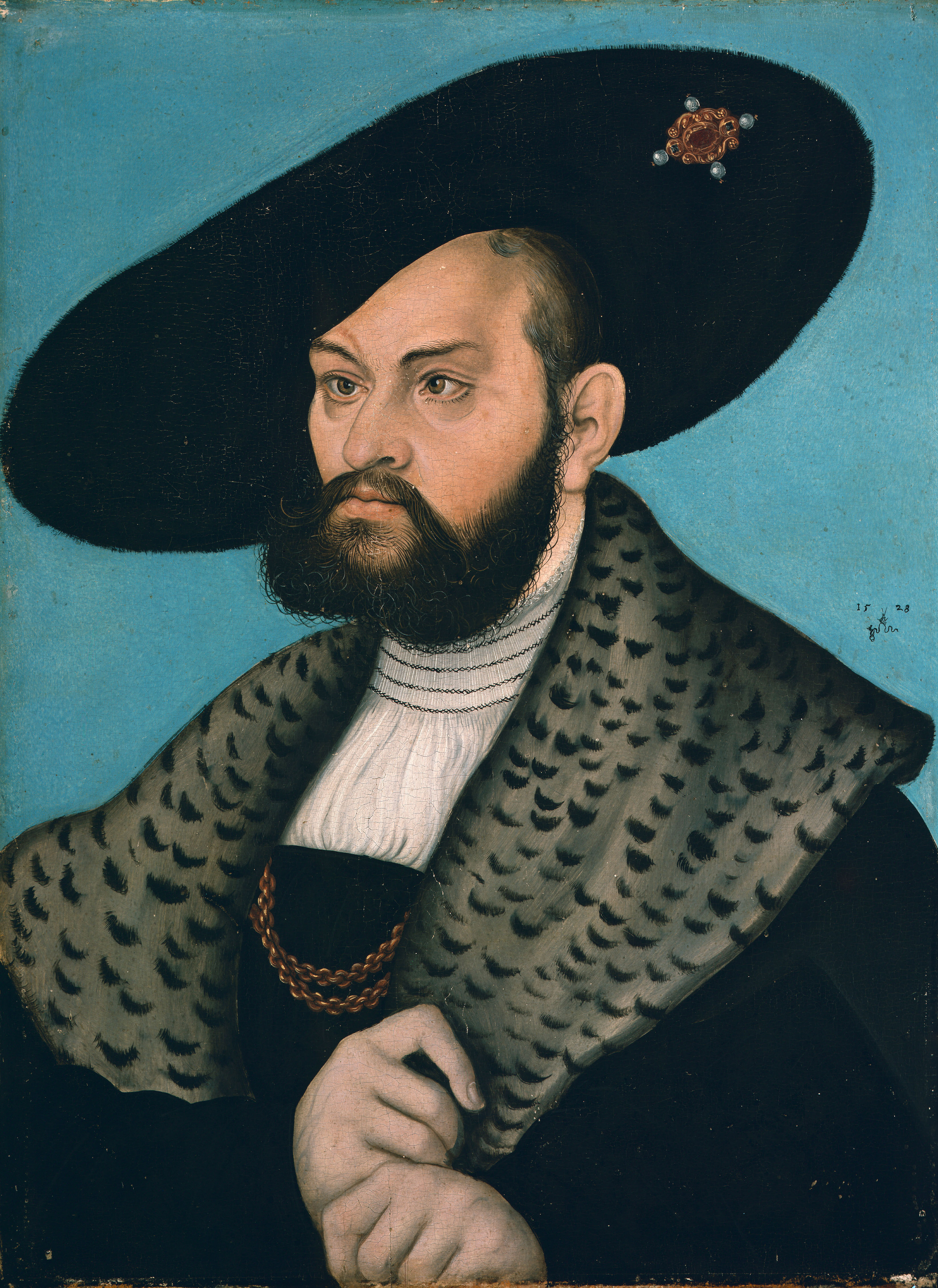
- Albert, Duke of Prussia, author of the hymn
- Occasion: Third Sunday after Epiphany
- Chorale: "Was mein Gott will, das g'scheh allzeit" by Albert, Duke of Prussia
- Performed: 21 January 1725: Leipzig
- Movements: 6
- Vocal: SATB choir and solo
- Instrumental: 2 oboes; 2 violins; viola; continuo

Was mein Gott will, das g'scheh allzeit (What my God wants, may it always happen), BWV 111, is a cantata by Johann Sebastian Bach for use in a Lutheran service. He composed the chorale cantata in Leipzig in 1725 for the third Sunday after Epiphany and first performed it on 21 January 1725, as part of his chorale cantata cycle. It is based on the hymn of the same name by Albert, Duke of Prussia, published in 1554, on the topic of the Christian's acceptance of God's will.

The cantata is part of Bach's chorale cantata cycle, the second cycle during his tenure as Thomaskantor that began in 1723. In the style of the cycle, an unknown poet retained the outer stanzas for framing choral movements and paraphrased the inner stanzas into four movements for soloists, alternating arias and recitatives. Bach scored the work for four vocal soloists, a four-part choir and a Baroque instrumental ensemble of two oboes, strings and basso continuo.

== History, hymn and words ==
When Bach composed Was mein Gott will, das g'scheh allzeit, he was in his second year as Thomaskantor (director of church music) in Leipzig. During his first year, beginning with the first Sunday after Trinity 1723, he had written a cycle of cantatas for the occasions of the liturgical year. In his second year he composed a second annual cycle of cantatas, which was planned to consist exclusively of chorale cantatas, each based on one Lutheran hymn. It included Was mein Gott will, das g'scheh allzeit.

Bach wrote the cantata for the Third Sunday after Epiphany. The prescribed readings for the Sunday were taken from the Epistle to the Romans, rules for life (Romans 12:17–21), and from the Gospel of Matthew, the healing of a leper (Matthew 8:1–13).

The cantata text is based on "Was mein Gott will, das g'scheh allzeit", a hymn in four stanzas, three of which were written by Albert, Duke of Prussia, who introduced the Reformation into Prussia, while an anonymous hymnwriter added the final stanza already in the first publication in 1554. In the typical format of Bach's chorale cantatas, the first and last stanza are retained unchanged, while an unknown librettist paraphrased the inner stanzas to texts for recitatives and arias. In this case, he transcribed rather freely each stanza of the hymn to a sequence of aria and recitative. Similar to Bach's cantata for the same occasion in the first cycle, Herr, wie du willt, so schicks mit mir, BWV 73, the text deals with the Christian's acceptance of God's will.

Bach conducted the Thomanerchor in the first performance on 21 January 1725.

== Music ==
=== Structure and scoring ===
Bach structured Was mein Gott will, das g'scheh allzeit in six movements. Both the text and the tune of the hymn are retained in the outer movements, a chorale fantasia and a four-part closing chorale. Bach scored the work for four vocal soloists (soprano S, alto (A), tenor (T) and bass (B)), a four-part choir, and a Baroque instrumental ensemble of two oboes (Ob), two violin parts (Vl), a viola part, and basso continuo. The duration is given as 22 minutes.

In the following table of the movements, the scoring, keys and time signatures are taken from Alfred Dürr's standard work Die Kantaten von Johann Sebastian Bach. The continuo, which plays throughout, is not shown.

Movements of Was mein Gott will, das g'scheh allzeit
No.	Title	Type	Vocal	Winds	Strings	Key	Time
1	Was mein Gott will, das g'scheh allzeit	Chorale fantasia	SATB	2Ob	2Vl Va	A minor	cut time
2	Entsetze dich, mein Herze, nicht	Aria	B			A minor	common time
3	O Törichter! der sich von Gott entzieht	Recitative	A			B minor	common time
4	So geh ich mit beherzten Schritten	Aria	A T		2Vl Va	G major	3/4
5	Drum wenn der Tod zuletzt den Geist	Recitative	S	2Ob			common time
6	Noch eins, Herr, will ich bitten dich	Chorale	SATB	2Ob	2Vl Va	A minor	3/2

=== Movements ===
==== 1 ====
In the opening chorus, "Was mein Gott will, das g'scheh allzeit" (Whatever my God wills, may that happen always), the soprano sings the melody of the chorale as a cantus firmus in long notes. The melody appears in a combination of phrases of different lengths, two measures alternating with three measures. Bach used a simpler version of the melody, with all phrases of measures, when he used the first stanza as movement 25 in his St Matthew Passion. In the cantata, the lower voices prepare each entrance by imitation, sometimes repeating the line to the soprano's long final note. The vocal parts are embedded in an independent orchestral concerto of the oboes, the strings and at times even the continuo.

==== 2 ====
The second movement is a bass aria accompanied only by the continuo, "Entzetze dich, mein Herze, nicht," (Do not recoil, my heart). The librettist retained the second line from the hymn unchanged, "Gott ist dein Trost und Zuversicht" (God is your comfort and confidence), which Bach treated by using the chorale tune for both the quotation and the free continuation "und deiner Seelen Leben" (and the life of your soul).

==== 3 ====
The third movement is an alto secco recitative, "O Törichter! der sich von Gott entzieht" (O fool! that pulls away from God).

==== 4 ====
The fourth movement is a duet of alto and tenor, "So geh ich mit geherzten Schritten, auch wenn mich Gott zum Grabe führt" (Thus I walk with encouraged steps, even when God leads me to my grave), accompanied by the strings. The steps are taken together in 3/4 time, as Julian Mincham described it: "in a minuet of a strongly assertive and confident character. But this should not surprise us; we have seen how Bach often takes suite rhythms, particularly minuet and gavotte, to represent the civilized movements of souls progressing towards heaven".

==== 5 ====
The fifth movement is a soprano recitative, accompanied by the two oboes, "Drum wenn der Tod zuletzt den Geist noch mit Gewalt aus seinem Körper reißt" (Therefore, when death in the end powerfully wrenches the spirit out of its body). It stresses the final words "O seliges, gewünschtes Ende!" (O blessed, desired end!) in an arioso.

==== 6 ====
The closing chorale, "Noch eins, Herr, will ich bitten ich" (One more thing, Lord, would I beg of you), is a "simple but powerful four-part setting" of the last stanza, according to Bach scholar Klaus Hofmann. Possibly Bach drew the setting from one of his collections, instead of writing a new composition.

== Manuscripts and publication ==
Bach's son Wilhelm Friedemann Bach inherited the autograph score which he passed in the 1750s to Johann Georg Nacke, a kantor who performed the work in Oelsnitz. The score reached the Königliche Bibliothek zu Berlin in 1904. Due to moves during World War II, it is now held by the Jagiellonian Library in Kraków. Although Bach's widow passed the parts that she inherited to the city of Leipzig in 1750, they have been lost.

The cantata was first published in 1876 in the first complete edition of Bach's work, the Bach-Gesellschaft Ausgabe. The volume in question was edited by Alfred Dörffel. In the Neue Bach-Ausgabe it was published in 1996, edited by Ulrich Leisinger.

== Recordings ==
The recordings are taken from the listing on the Bach Cantatas Website. Ensembles playing period instruments in historically informed performances are shown with a green background.

Recordings of Was mein Gott will, das g'scheh allzeit
Title	Conductor / Choir / Orchestra	Soloists	Label	Year	Instr.
Bach Made in Germany Vol. 1 – Cantatas II	Günther Ramin Thomanerchor Gewandhausorchester	Agnes Giebel; Annegret Häussler; Gert Lutze; Johannes Oettel	Eterna	1953	
Bach Made in Germany Vol. 2 – Cantatas IV	Kurt Thomas Thomanerchor Gewandhausorchester	Elisabeth Grümmer; Marga Höffgen; Hans-Joachim Rotzsch; Theo Adam	Eterna	1960	
Bach Cantatas Vol. 1 – Advent and Christmas	Karl Richter Münchener Bach-Chor Münchener Bach-Orchester	Edith Mathis: Anna Reynolds; Peter Schreier; Theo Adam	Archiv Produktion	1972	
Die Bach Kantate Vol. 23	Helmuth Rilling Gächinger Kantorei Bach-Collegium Stuttgart	Arleen Augér; Helen Watts; Lutz-Michael Harder; Philippe Huttenlocher	Hänssler	1980	
J. S. Bach: Das Kantatenwerk • Complete Cantatas • Les Cantates, Folge / Vol. 6	Nikolaus Harnoncourt Tölzer Knabenchor Concentus Musicus Wien	soloist of the Tölzer Knabenchor; Paul Esswood; Kurt Equiluz; Ruud van der Meer	Teldec	1981	Period
Bach Edition Vol. 5 – Cantatas Vol. 2	Pieter Jan Leusink Holland Boys Choir Netherlands Bach Collegium	Ruth Holton; Sytse Buwalda; Nico van der Meel; Bas Ramselaar	Brilliant Classics	1999	Period
J. S. Bach: Cantatas for the 3rd Sunday of Epiphany	John Eliot Gardiner Monteverdi Choir English Baroque Soloists	Joanne Lunn; Sara Mingardo; Julian Podger; Stephen Varcoe	Archiv Produktion	2000	Period
J. S. Bach: Complete Cantatas Vol. 12	Ton Koopman Amsterdam Baroque Orchestra & Choir	Lisa Larsson; Annette Markert; Christoph Prégardien; Klaus Mertens	Antoine Marchand	2000	Period
J. S. Bach: Cantatas Vol. 32 – BWV 111, 123, 124, 125	Masaaki Suzuki Bach Collegium Japan	Yukari Nonoshita; Robin Blaze; Andreas Weller; Peter Kooy	BIS	2005	Period
