= Mūza Rubackytė =

Lithuanian pianist (born 1959)

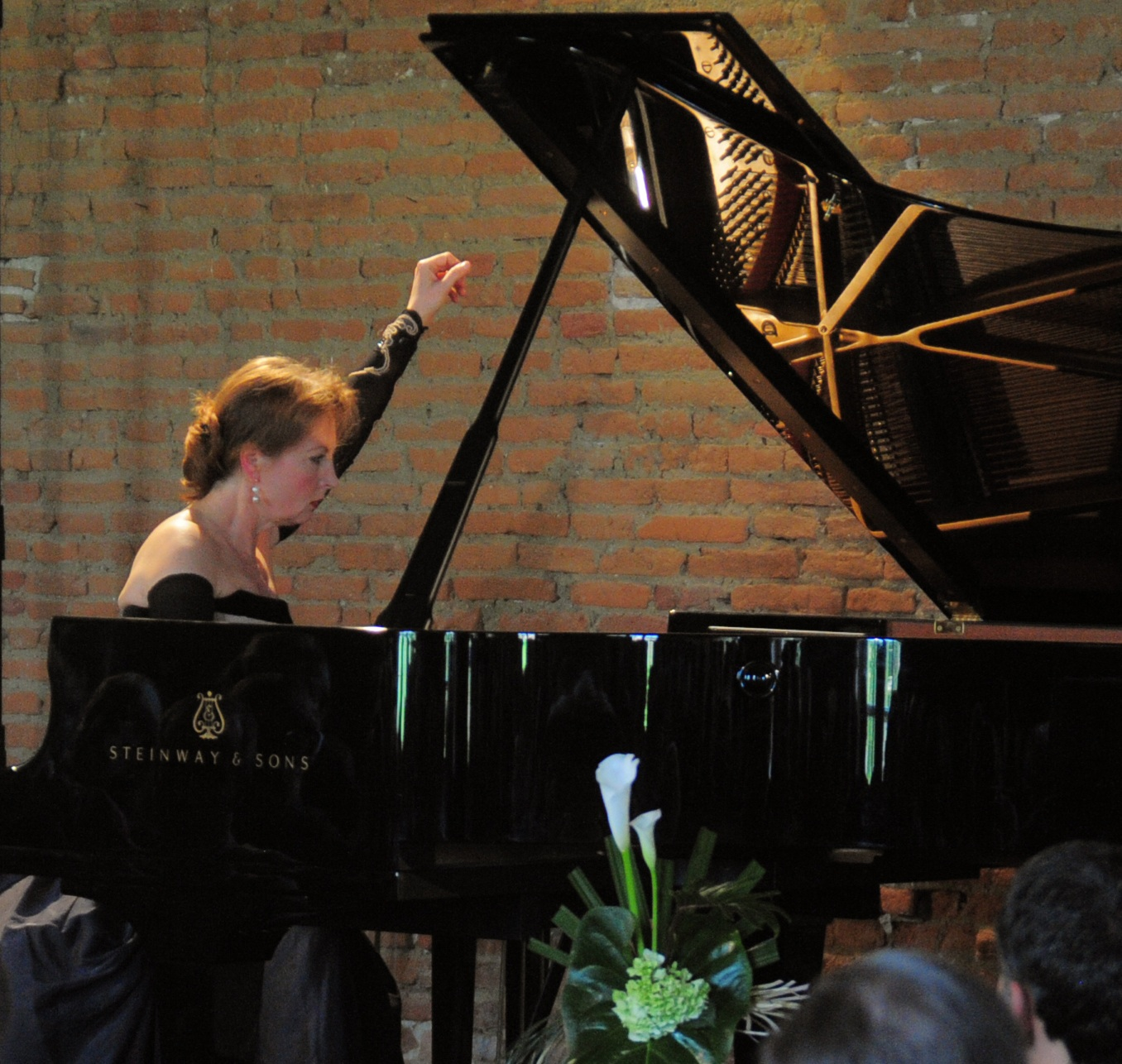

Mūza Rubackytė (born May 19, 1959) is a Lithuanian pianist, currently residing in Vilnius, Paris and Geneva. Rubackytė has been awarded the Order of the Lithuanian Grand Duke Gediminas, Lithuanian Muzes, and has been named as the National Artist of Lithuania.

After diplomas at the Tchaikovsky Conservatory of Moscow, she was a prize-winner at the All Union Competition in St. Petersburg. In 1981 she won the Grand Prix at the Liszt-Bartok International Piano Competition in Budapest. A member of the Lithuanian resistance, she was only able to leave the USSR in 1989. In Paris she won First Prize at the Concours international Les Grands Maîtres Français, of the Triptyque Association, created by Ravel, Dukas, and Roussel. In France, Rubackytė has been invited to many prestigious festivals and concert venues: Fêtes Romantiques-Nohant, Radio France-Montpellier, Musique en Côte Basque, Festival Chopin-Paris, Bagatelle, Lisztomanias, Tons voisins, Gaveau, Champs Elysées, Unesco, Opéra Bastille, and Capitole-Toulouse. She was one of the first pianists to perform the entire Liszt’s Years of Pilgrimage in three concerts on the same day, alone or in the company of renowned actors.

She has also performed on many more venues and countries around the world: London Wigmore Hall, Opéra de Santiago, Grand Rex, Opéra et Teatro Colón (Buenos Aires), Montevideo Sodre, Geneva Victoria Hall, Amsterdam Concertgebouw, Cairo and Alexandria Opéra, Bonn Beethoven Haus, St. Petersburg Philharmonic, Moscow Tchaikovsky Hall, Peking, and Shanghai. As well as New Zealand, Bermuda, Japan, Africa, and South America.

Rubackytė has performed together with many renowned conductors such as Gergiev, Kogan, Kachidze, Jordania, Lano, Bay, Schermerhorn, Zimmermann, Segal, Slatkin, Nelson, Davis, Haendel, and Fedoseyev. She has also been accompanied by Lausanne, Teatro Colon, Santiago Opera, Auckland National, Russian State, Capitole, Garde Républicaine, Ensemble Orchestral de Paris, Bretagne, Auvergne, Douai, and Lorraine orchestras. She has also performed with the following orchestras from the USA: Newport, Portland, Houston, Nashville, North Carolina, Canton, Austin, Virginia, Detroit, San Juan, and Washington.

In 2012, she performed Resurrection—K. Penderecki’s Concerto for Piano and Orchestra (homage to victims of 11 September 2001) in Puerto Rico, and again in 2013 at the opening of the 3rd Vilnius Piano Festival and in Warsaw for the master’s 80th anniversary. In 2016, at Bogota Teatro Mayor, she performed the Concerto directed by Maestro K. Penderecki himself.

Rubackytė is regularly invited to be a member of the international competitions’ jury: Liszt Competition in Utrecht and Weimar, Venice Piano Competition, Unisa in Pretoria, competitions in Minsk, and Vilnius.

Professor of the Lithuanian Academy of Music and Theater, teaching takes a large place in her field of all activities. She also gives numerous masterclasses around the world, particularly at the Liszt Academies in Budapest and Weimar.

In Lithuania, the President of the Republic awarded her with the Legion of Honor for her actions for independence and several decorations for her commitment as a cultural ambassador. In 2018, Rubackytė received the Commander’s Grand Cross of Order of Vytautas the Great. She is a founder and artistic director of the Vilnius Piano Festival (founded for Vilnius—European Capital of Culture in 2009), whose 6th edition was in November 2019. She is also hiding the St. Christopher’s award of Vilnius city.

Rubackytė played complete Years of Pilgrimage at the Bayreuth Festival and Liszt Festival in Raiding. Complete 24 Preludes and Fugues by Shostakovich at the Festival Radio-France-Montpellier, and F. Liszt’s 12 Transcendental Etudes at the Radio France Montpellier Festival.

Her discography of more than 30 titles includes complete Years of Pilgrimage by Liszt (Lyrinx), 24 Preludes and Fugues by Shostakovich (Brilliant Classics), concertos for piano and orchestra by Beethoven, Liszt, Shostakovich, Prokofiev, Schnittke, and Saint-Sans for the Great Lithuanian live recordings series (2015, Doron). Works for piano solo by Louis Vierne (2015), as well as with string quartet and voice (2016, Brilliant Classics). In 2017, she released sonatas by Julius Reubke for piano and organ with Olivier Vernet (Ligia) and the album De la Valse à l’Abîme by Schubert, Schubert/Liszt with Lyrinx. In 2019, two new CDs came to light: 6th Great Lithuanian live recordings with works for piano and orchestra by Bartok, Liszt, and Schubert/Liszt (Doron) and an album together with string quartet Mettis—Dramatic Russian Legacy—homage to Shostakovich and Weinberg (Ligia).

She holds various teaching positions at several educational institutions, including the Lithuanian Academy of Music and Theatre in Vilnius, Conservatoire Rachmaninoff in Paris, Tchaikovsky Conservatory in Moscow, Messiaen Academy of Music in the Netherlands. She has also been a judge at the Lithuanian International Piano Competition and International F. Liszt Piano Competition (Utrecht).

A native of Lithuania, Rubackytė was born into a family of musicians. At the age of 7, she made her professional debut in the capital city of Vilnius, performing Haydn's D Major Piano Concerto with the Lithuanian National Chamber Orchestra. Six years later, she won the first prize in the National Young Artists Competition. The victory opened the doors to the Moscow Tchaikovsky Conservatory, where she studied under Yakov Flier, Mikhail Voskressensky, and Bela Davidovitch. During her conservatoire period, she won the first prize in the Tallinn (Estonia) Piano Competition and shortly thereafter was awarded the Conservatory's first prize in solo piano, chamber music, and accompaniment.

During the Soviet period, Rubackytė was not allowed to travel outside the Communist Bloc but performed with orchestras of the Baltic states, Ukraine, Armenia, Uzbekistan, Kazakhstan, and Belarus. He also performed with the great ensembles of Moscow, Vilnius, and St. Petersburg. She has lived in Paris since 1991.

== Selected recordings ==
- Camille Saint-Saëns, Piano concerto n°5, Mūza Rubackyté piano, the Lithuanian National Philharmonic Orchestra, conducted by Hanns-Martin Schneidt and Piano concerto n°2 (conducted by Alain Pâris). Live record. CD Doron music 2014
