= Philippe Chamouard =

French composer

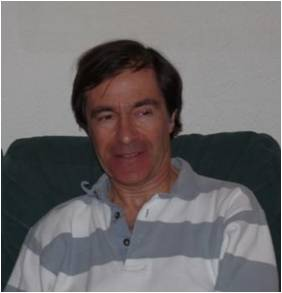
- Philippe Chamouard in 2012

Background information
- Born: 24 February 1952 (age 74); Paris, France
- Genre: Contemporary classical music
- Occupation: Composer
- Years active: 1980s–present

Philippe Chamouard (born 24 February 1952 in Paris) is a French composer of contemporary classical music. His catalogue includes orchestral, concertante, chamber, vocal and choral works, with particular emphasis on symphonic writing.

== Biography ==
Chamouard was born in Paris in 1952. He studied piano with Guy Lasson and harmony, counterpoint and composition with Roger Boutry. He later studied musicology at the University of Paris-Sorbonne, where he obtained a doctorate for work on the orchestration of Gustav Mahler's symphonies.

His interest in Mahler led to the publication of the book Mahler tel qu'en lui-même in 1989. He has been described by his publisher as an honorary member of the International Gustav Mahler Gesellschaft in Vienna, and he worked as an editor for Deutsche Grammophon before teaching musical writing at the University of Paris IV until 2004.

Chamouard later rejected a number of his earlier scores. In an interview with Crescendo Magazine, he stated that in 1987 he destroyed earlier works that he considered too academic, and that he regarded Sphène for orchestra, composed in 1988, as a new beginning in his catalogue. Since the early 1990s, his orchestral works have been performed in France and abroad, including by the Orchestre Colonne and at festivals and concert series in several European and non-European countries.

His music is frequently associated with traditional large-scale forms, including the symphony and the concerto. By 2024, recordings of his music included the Fourth, Sixth, Seventh, Eighth and Ninth symphonies, concertos for violin, bassoon and trumpet, and chamber and instrumental works.

== Music ==
Chamouard's music has been described as continuing to use established musical forms, including the symphony and concerto, within a contemporary tonal or neo-tonal idiom. His work includes symphonies, concertos, chamber music, choral works and pieces for solo instruments.

The symphonic catalogue includes Le Vagabond des nuages, recorded by the Plovdiv Philharmonic Orchestra under Nayden Todorov, La Montagne de l'âme, recorded by the Transylvania Symphony Orchestra under Alain Pâris, and later symphonic works recorded for labels including Hortus and Indésens.

== Publication ==
- Mahler tel qu'en lui-même, Éditions Méridiens Klincksieck, 1989; reprint Éditions Connaissances et savoirs, 2006, ISBN 2-7539-0075-2.

== Recordings ==
The following selected recordings include albums devoted wholly or substantially to Chamouard's music:

| Year | Recording | Performers | Label / catalogue | Notes |
|---|---|---|---|---|
| 2013 | Philippe Chamouard: Symphonie No. 8 & Poème du Vent | Orchestre Symphonique du Conservatoire de Rouen; Claude Brendel, conductor | Éditions Hortus, HOR548 | Includes Symphonie No. 8 and Poème du Vent. |
| 2013 | Symphonie No. 7 & Les Rêves de l'ombre | Hungarian Symphony Orchestra; Alain Pâris, conductor; Orchestre Symphonique de Rouen; Claude Brendel, conductor | Orphée / Hortus | Reviewed by ResMusica in 2014. |
| 2015 | P. Chamouard: Deux œuvres symphoniques | Orchestre Symphonique de Transylvanie; Alain Pâris, conductor | Disques Triton, TRI331197 | Includes Symphonie No. 6 "La Montagne de l'âme" and Les Rêves de l'ombre. |
| 2018 | Chamouard: Symphonie Le vagabond des nuages | Plovdiv Philharmonic Orchestra; Nayden Todorov, conductor; Madrigal de Paris; Pierre Calmelet, conductor | Indésens, INDE112 | Includes Symphonie No. 4 "Le Vagabond des nuages", Madrigal d'été pour violoncelle et orchestre and Salve Regina. |
| 2021 | Philippe Chamouard: Les Oiseaux de Solitude | Vincent Lucas, Laurent Wagschal, Marie Pierre Langlamet, Martin Löhr, Jean-François Durez, Nicolas Prost, Aurélien Ouvrard and Quatuor Joachim | Indésens, INDE133 | Includes Polymnia, Madrigal d'été, Crystal, Nocturnal and Les Oiseaux de solitude. |
| 2023 | Philippe Chamouard: Les Concertos | Svetlin Roussev, violin; Giorgio Mandolesi, bassoon; Éric Aubier, trumpet; Orchestre Symphonique de Douai; Jean-Jacques Kantorow, conductor | Indésens / Calliope Records, IC013 | Includes the Concertino pour violon et orchestre, Concerto pour basson et orchestre and Concerto nocturne pour trompette et orchestre. |
| 2024 | Escales | Orchestre Philharmonique de Brașov; Cristian Oroșanu, conductor | Indésens, IC021 | Includes Symphonie No. 9, Valse Toscane and Canadian March. |
