= Erlöserkirche, Munich =

Oldest Lutheran church in Schwabing

Coordinates: 48°09′53″N 11°35′16″E

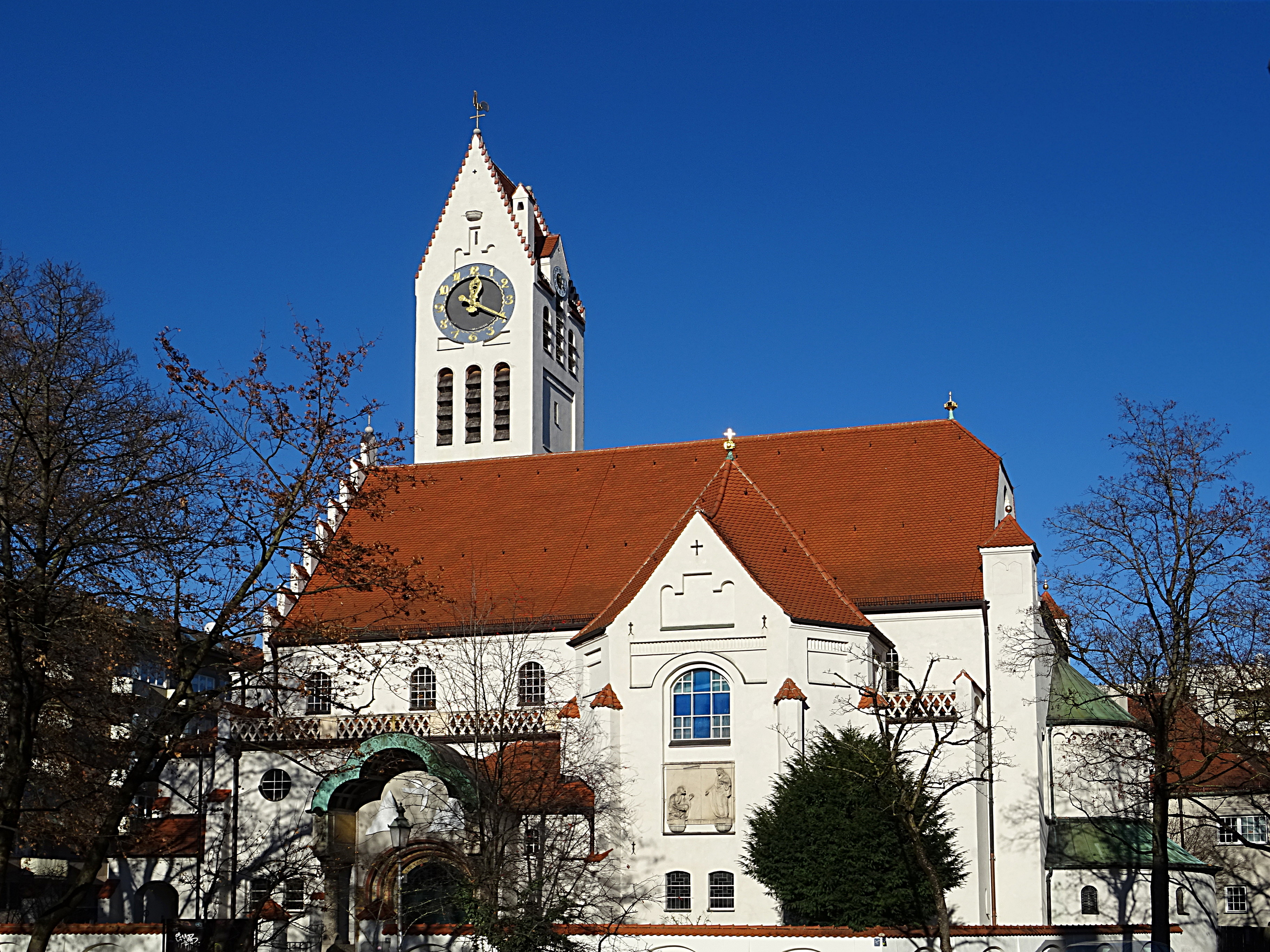
Erlöserkirche from the south

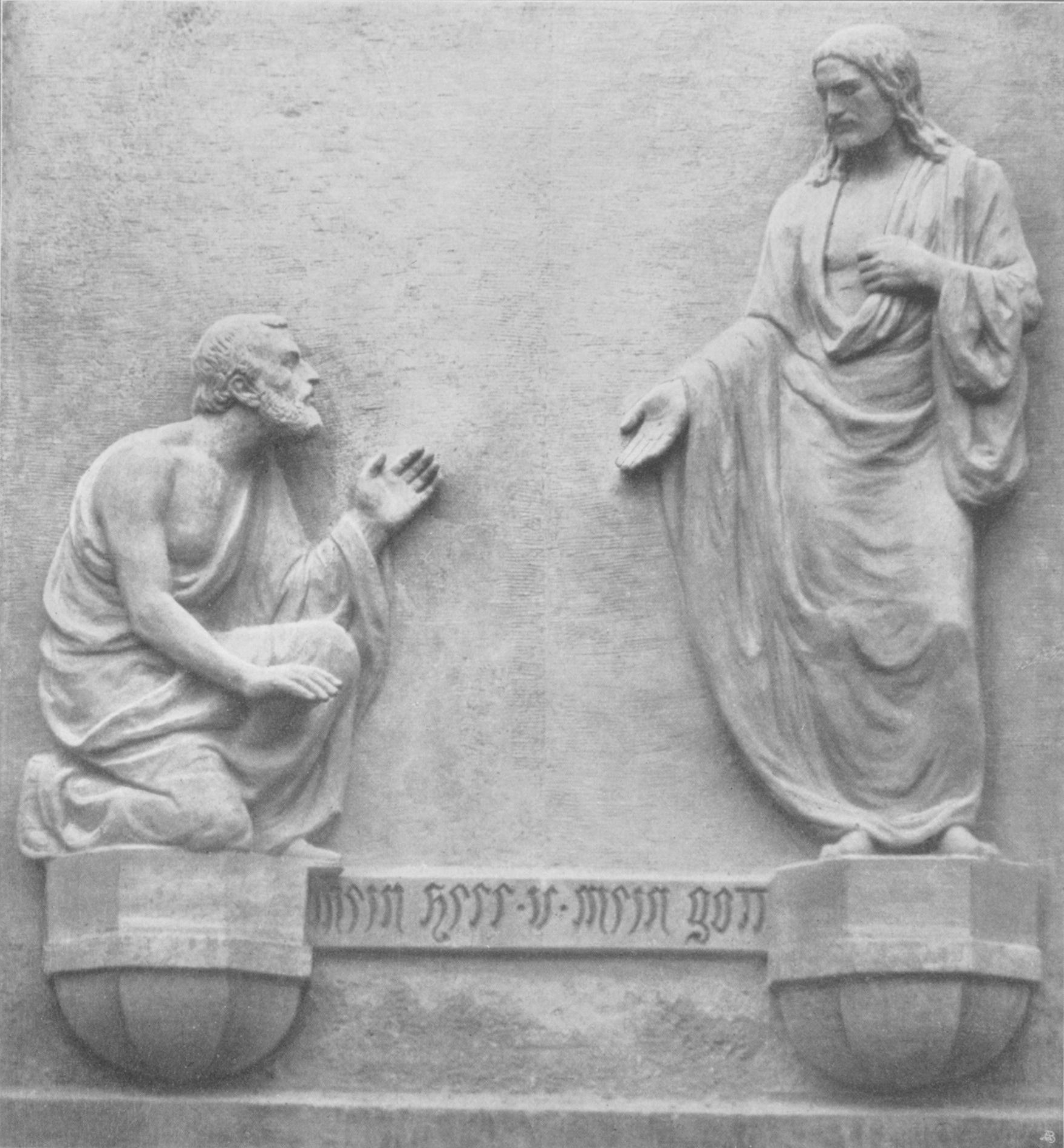
Relief by Hermann Lang

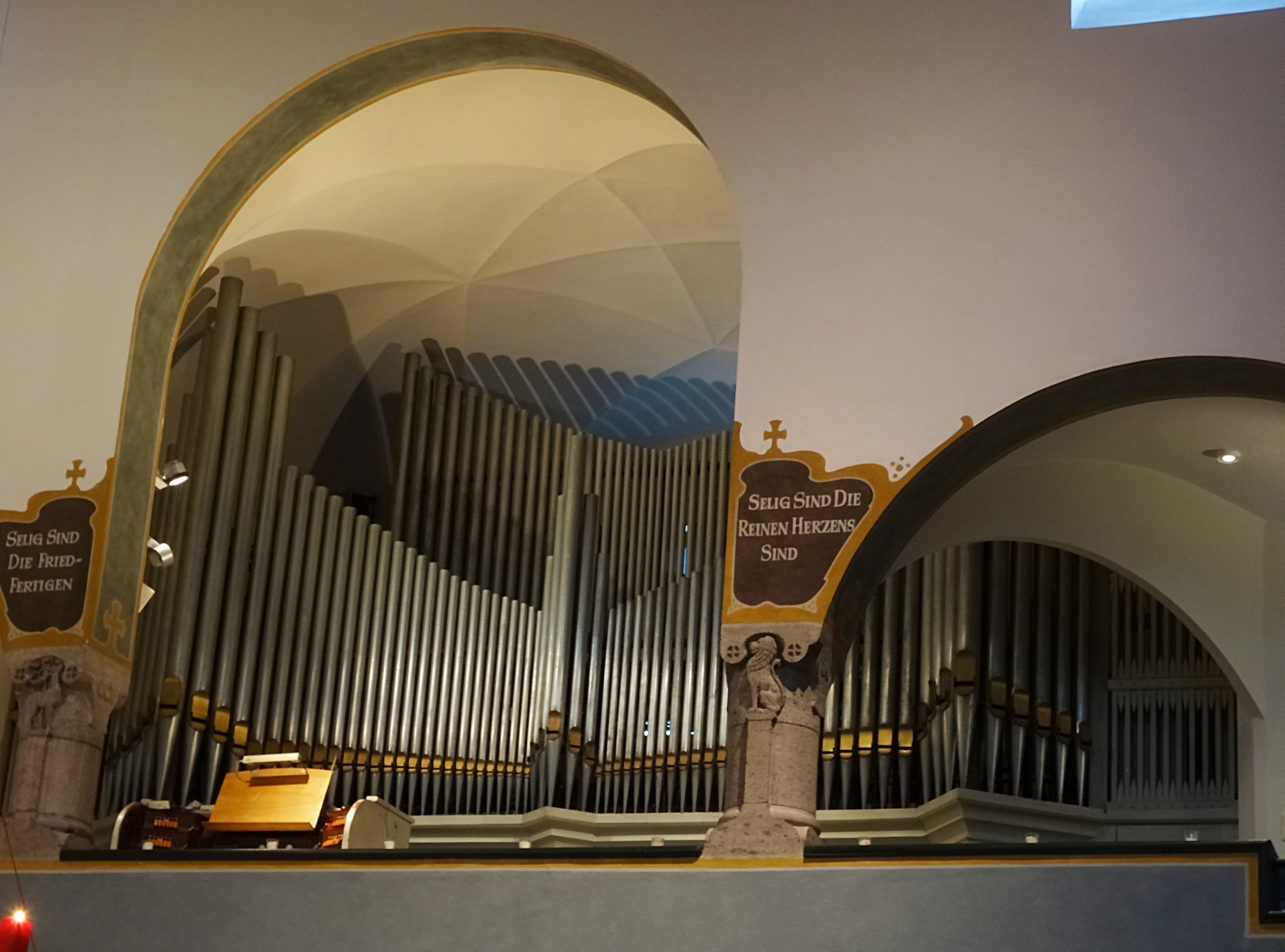
Steinmeyer-Moser organ

The Erlöserkirche (Church of the Redeemer) is the oldest Lutheran church in Schwabing, part of Munich, Bavaria, Germany. The full name is Evangelisch-Lutherische Erlöserkirche. It was built from 1899 to 1901 on a design by Theodor Fischer, in a style combining historicism and Jugendstil.

== History ==
The Lutheran congregation in predominantly Catholic Schwabing had only a small Bethaus (prayer house). A church was planned to accommodate a growing population in the still rural suburb, where Wassily Kandinsky, Paul Klee and Thomas Mann lived. It was designed by Theodor Fischer who followed the model of a classical basilica such as St. Anna im Lehel. The style recalls historicism, but includes Jugendstil decoration and shows a tendency to clearer modern structure. The architect, who designed the first church in his career, planned "eine echt protestantische Kirche, [...] in erster Linie ein[en] Predigtsaal, in dem das Wort lebendig werde" ("a true Protestant church, first of all a hall for the sermon, to make the word come alive").

The pulpit is a central element of the interior. The altar is in focus in a richly decorated apse. The church was consecrated on 6 October 1901. In 1976, the altar was moved forward, closer to the congregation. Today the church is located at the Münchner Freiheit, a prominent location in the cityscape.

== Features ==
The church has an exterior relief by Hermann Lang, showing Thomas and Jesus, with Thomas acknowledging Jesus as the redeemer, and two reliefs by Ernst Neumeister after Fischer's designs. The altar and the pulpit are made from yellowish marble from Verona. The large painting in the apsis was created by Linda Kögel. Jesus on a throne, surrounded by angels, sits above scenes from parish life such as baptism, wedding and funeral, with portraits of parish members at the time.

When the church was built, an organ was built on the southern gallery by G. F. Steinmeyer & Co. (Oettingen), with two manuals and 21 stops. It was expanded in 1938 by Albert Moser to 49 stops and electric traction, and an overhaul followed in 1962 by the Kaufbeuren company Orgelbau Schmid. A second organ was built by Rieger Orgelbau on the west gallery in 1990. It has three manuals and pedals with 43 stops.

== Literature ==
- Gallas, Klaus [in German] (1979). München : von der welfischen Gründung Heinrichs des Löwen bis zur Gegenwart; Kunst, Kultur, Geschichte (in German). Köln: DuMont. ISBN 3-7701-1094-3. OCLC 263645671.
- Kitzmann, Armin (1990). Das offene Tor : aus der Geschichte der Protestanten in München (in German). München: Claudius Verlag. ISBN 3-532-62094-4. OCLC 22474958.
- Koch, Klaus (1976). Erlöserkirche München-Schwabing 1901–1976. Ein Stück Münchener Freiheit. Eine Dokumentation (in German). München: Selbstverlag der Evang.-Luth. Kirchengemeinde Erlöserkirche.
- Langenberger, S. (1907). "Die Erlöserkirche in München". Süddeutsche Bauhütte: Illustr. Zeitschrift für Hoch- u. Tiefbau u. das gesamte Baugewerbe. Bayerisches Submissionsblatt. Vol. 18. Carl Haushalter. (später): Georg D.W. Callwey.
