= Ich hab in Gottes Herz und Sinn =

Christian hymn written in 1647

- Christian hymn by Paul Gerhardt
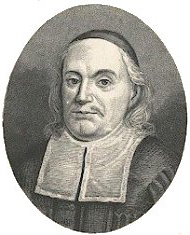
- Paul Gerhardt, who wrote the lyrics
- English: I have surrendered to God's heart and mind
- Language: German
- Meter: 8.7.8.7.4.4.7.4.4.7.
- Published: 1647

"Ich hab in Gottes Herz und Sinn" (I have surrendered to God's heart and mind) is a Christian hymn with a text by Paul Gerhardt in twelve stanzas is sung to the melody of "Was mein Gott will, das g'scheh allzeit". The theme of the hymn is faith in God and the submission to his will.

The hymn was written in 1647 and published that same year in Johann Crüger's hymnal Praxis Pietatis Melica. Translated into English it has appeared in ten English hymnals.

== Text ==
Gerhardt wrote his poem in twelve stanzas in 1647 during the Thirty Years' War. The theme of the hymn is faith in God and the submission to his will. The first lines, "Ich hab in Gottes Herz und Sinn mein Herz und Sinn ergeben", translate to "I have surrendered to God's heart and mind my heart and mind." Every stanza has 10 lines, following the meter 8.7.8.7.4.4.7.4.4.7.

The song was first published in 1647 in Johann Crüger's hymnal Praxis Pietatis Melica. in the 1656 edition of the hymnal, it was No. 328 in the chapter "Vom Christlichen Leben und Wandel" (Of Christian life and action), in the 1666 edition it came with the header "Christliche Ergebung in Gottes Willen" (Christian submission to God's will).

== Melody and musical settings ==
The hymn is sung to the melody of "Was mein Gott will, das g'scheh allzeit". Johann Sebastian Bach composed a chorale cantata on the hymn, Ich hab in Gottes Herz und Sinn, BWV 92, in 1725 as part of his chorale cantata cycle. While Bach frequently used single stanzas from Gerhardt's hymns for his cantatas and Passions, this hymn is the only one on which he based a chorale cantata. Different from the format for these cantatas to retain only the text of the outer stanzas, Bach set the text of five of the twelve stanzas unchanged.

== Translation ==
"Ich hab in Gottes Herz und Sinn" was translated to several English-language versions and appeared in ten hymnals. J. Kelly translated the hymn in 1867, titled "Christian Devotion to God's Will", with the incipit "I into God's own heart and mind".
