= Was mein Gott will, das g'scheh allzeit =

16th-century German Lutheran hymn

- Lutheran hymn
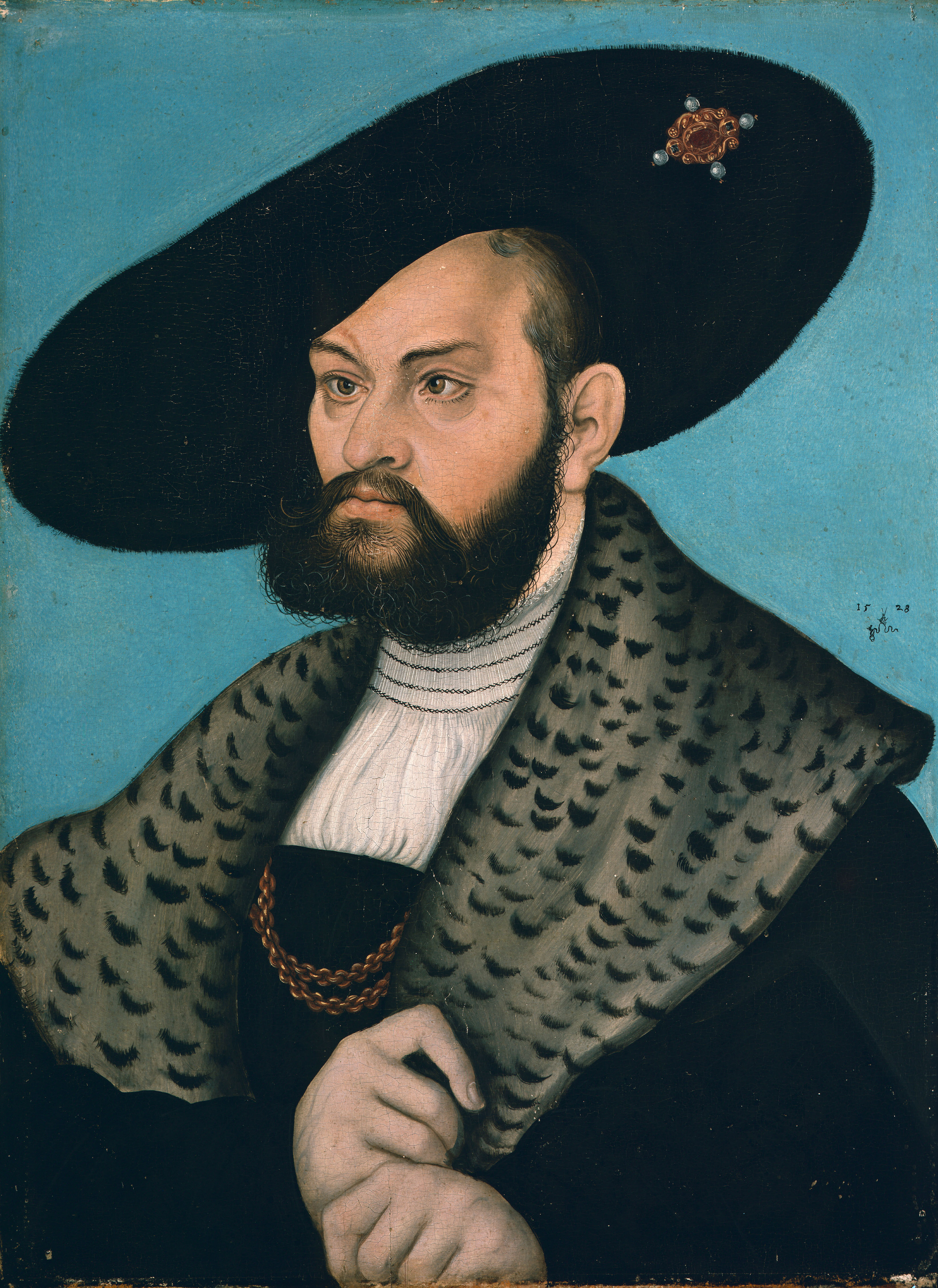
- Portrait of the author by Lucas Cranach
- Catalogue: Zahn 7568
- Written: 1547
- Text: attr. to Albert, Duke of Prussia
- Language: German
- Melody: by Claudin de Sermisy
- Composed: 1529
- Published: 1547

"Was mein Gott will, das g'scheh allzeit" (What my God wants should always happen) is a Lutheran hymn in German. The text from c. 1550 is attributed to Albert, Duke of Prussia. The melody, Zahn No. 7568, goes back to a tune by Claudin de Sermisy, written in 1529 for a secular French song. The hymn has belonged to core Lutheran hymnody without interruption and is part of the Protestant hymnal Evangelisches Gesangbuch as EG 364.

It has been set to music throughout centuries, including by Johann Sebastian Bach, who based a chorale cantata on it, Was mein Gott will, das g'scheh allzeit, BWV 111, and used the first stanza as a chorale in the St Matthew Passion and several cantatas.

== History ==
The text is attributed to Albert, Duke of Prussia, (Note: This is the same person as Albrecht, Duke of Prussia, and Albrecht of Brandenburg-Ansbach, while other sources mention instead Albert, Margrave of Brandenburg-Kulmbach.) and is said to have been written in 1547 in three stanzas, with an additional stanza added in a broadsheet publication in Nürnberg c. 1554, and in Fünff Schöne Geistliche Lieder in Dresden in 1556. The melody was composed by Claudin de Sermisy, published in 1529 for a secular French song.

The hymn has belonged to core Lutheran hymnody without interruption, appearing in several hymnals. It is part of the German-language Protestant hymnal Evangelisches Gesangbuch as EG 364.

== Content and text ==
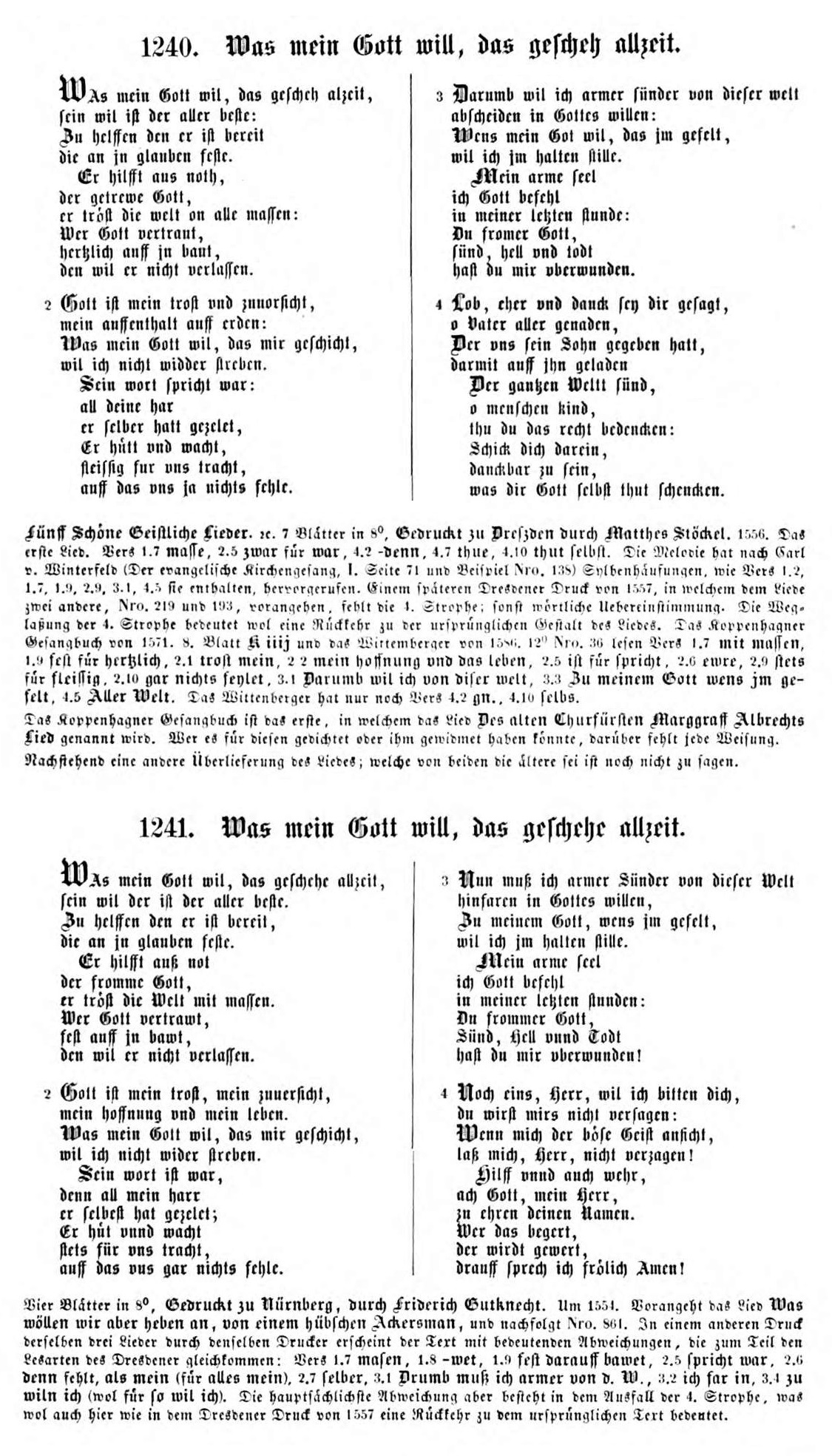
Publication of two early versions with commentary, Philipp Wackernagel, 1870

"Was mein Gott will, das g'scheh allzeit" is an expression of unlimited trust in God, even when facing death. It is in four stanzas of 10 lines each. In bar form, the stollen has two lines, and six often short lines form the abgesang, rhyming ABAB DDEFFE. The text as used in modern hymnals is:

1. Was mein Gott will, gescheh allzeit,
sein Will, der ist der beste.
Zu helfen dem er ist bereit,
der an ihn glaubet feste.
Er hilft aus Not,
der treue Gott,
er tröst' die Welt ohn Maßen.
Wer Gott vertraut,
fest auf ihn baut,
den will er nicht verlassen.

2. Gott ist mein Trost, mein Zuversicht,
mein Hoffnung und mein Leben;
was mein Gott will, das mir geschieht,
will ich nicht widerstreben.
Sein Wort ist wahr,
denn all mein Haar
er selber hat gezählet.
Er hüt' und wacht,
stets für uns tracht'
auf dass uns gar nichts fehlet.

3. Drum, muss ich Sünder von der Welt
hinfahrn nach Gottes Willen
zu meinem Gott, wenn's ihm gefällt,
will ich ihm halten stille.
Mein arme Seel
ich Gott befehl
in meiner letzten Stunden:
du treuer Gott,
Sünd, Höll und Tod
hast du mir überwunden.

4. Noch eins, Herr, will ich bitten dich,
du wirst mir's nicht versagen:
Wenn mich der böse Geist anficht,
lass mich, Herr, nicht verzagen.
Hilf, steu'r und wehr,
ach Gott, mein Herr,
zu Ehren deinem Namen.
Wer das begehrt,
dem wird's gewährt.
Drauf sprech ich fröhlich: Amen.

While hymnals such as the 1854 Kernlieder have "und tröstt die Welt mit Maßen" in the first stanza, about consolation of the world, other hymnals have "und züchtiget mit Maßen" (chastises in moderation), including Praxis pietatis melica in 1653, the Deutsches Evangelisches Gesangbuch of 1914 and Otto Riethmüller's Ein neues Lied of 1932.

== Melody and musical settings ==
The hymn has always been sung to a tune that originated with Claudin de Sermisy, which was published in 1529 to a secular text, "Il me suffit de tous mes maulx". It appeared with a paraphrase of Psalm 129 in 1540 in the Antwerp Souterliedekens (Psalm songs). The melody appeared with "Was mein Gott will" in Joachim Magdeburg's hymnal Christliche und tröstliche Tischgesenge, mit Vier Stimmen (Christian and consoling table songs, for four voices) in Erfurt in 1571.

The artful original melody, with many syncopes and irregular metre, was simplified early to notes of even length. The tune is also used for Paul Gerhardt's "Ich hab in Gottes Herz und Sinn". Johann Sebastian Bach used this version in his chorale cantata Was mein Gott will, das g'scheh allzeit, BWV 111. He also used individual stanzas in other cantatas, and the first stanza in his St Matthew Passion as movement 25, as the reply of Jesus after his prayer in Gethsemane. In translations of the scene, it was rendered as "O Father, let Thy will be done". A singable translation in the 2004 edition by Carus-Verlag has "God's will is best, it shall be done".

Composers wrote settings with different scoring, for example Heinrich Schütz in Geistliche Chormusik (No. 24), Georg Philipp Telemann in cantata TWV 1:1529, Max Reger in Op. 135a No. 27, Hermann Bendix, Günter Raphael and Erwin Amend.

The following example is from Bach's St Matthew Passion:

== Literature ==
- Philipp Wackernagel: 1240. Was mein Gott will, das gescheh allzeit und 1241. Was mein Gott will, das geschehe allzeit. In: Das deutsche Kirchenlied von der ältesten Zeit bis zu Anfang des XVII. Jahrhunderts, 3. Band, Leipzig 1870, pp. 1070–1071
