= Münchener Bach-Chor =

Mixed choir for concert and oratorio in Munich

- Choir
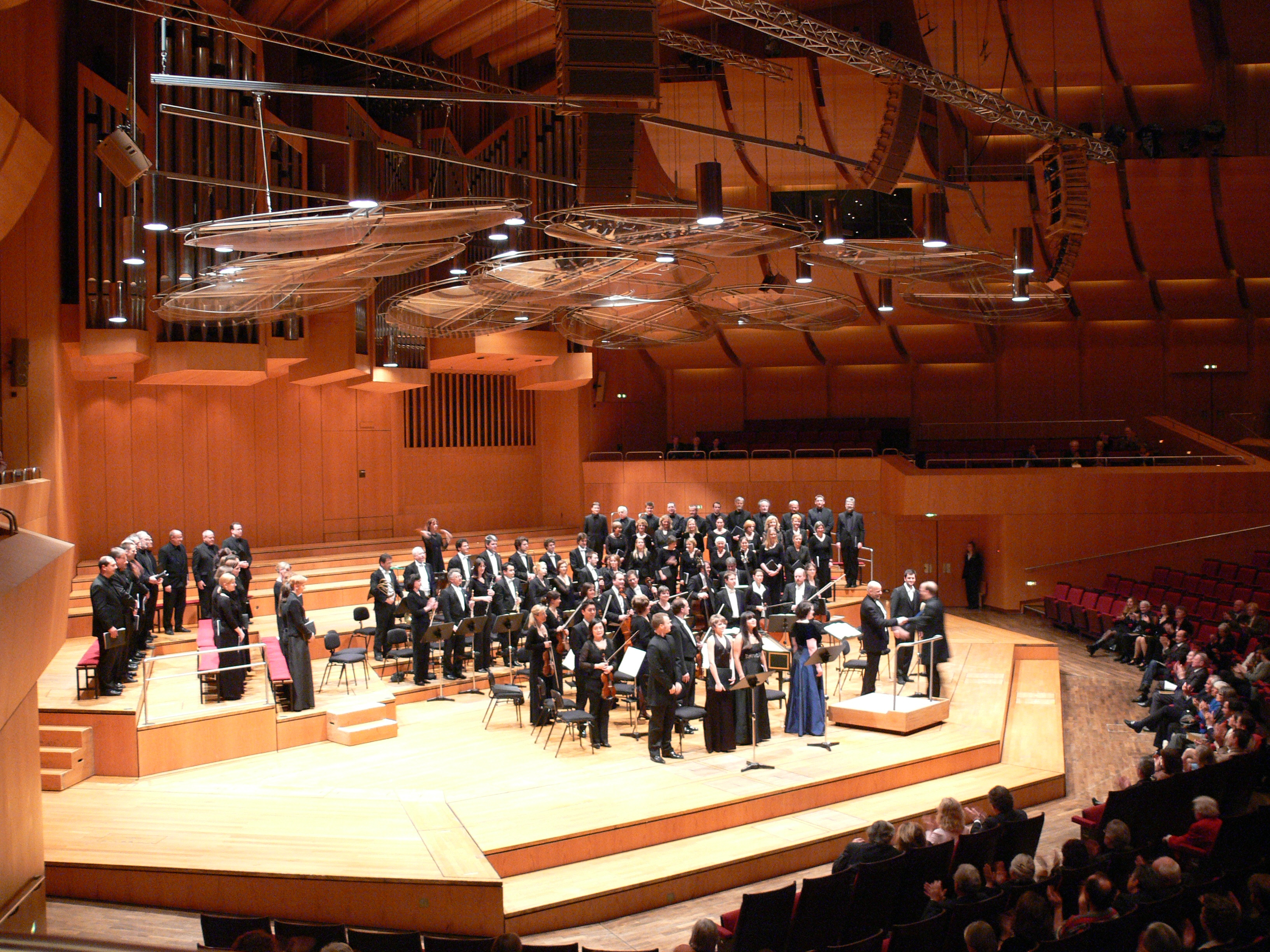
- Soloists, Münchener Bach-Chor and Bachkollegium München after a concert at the Gasteig in 2008
- Origin: Munich
- Founded: 1945
- Genre: Mixed concert choir
- Chief conductor: Wilhelm Kamlah; Michael Schneider; Karl Richter; Hanns-Martin Schneidt; Hansjörg Albrecht
- Headquarters: Munich
- Website: www.muenchener-bachchor.de/english/c_chor.htm

Münchener Bach-Chor is a mixed choir for concert and oratorio in Munich. Performances, international tours and recordings with Karl Richter and the Münchener Bach-Orchester made the choir internationally known.

== History ==
=== Heinrich-Schütz-Kreis ===
The choir was founded after World War II by Wilhelm Kamlah as Heinrich-Schütz-Kreis at the Protestant church St. Markus in Munich. The group introduced the music of the Protestant Heinrich Schütz to the predominantly Catholic Munich. The choir was later directed by Michael Schneider. In 1951 Karl Richter took over.

=== Münchener Bach-Chor ===
In 1954 the choir was named Münchener Bach-Chor, and the focus shifted to the regular performance of Johann Sebastian Bach's works. Richter conducted several broadcasts, television productions and recordings, frequently with the Münchener Bach-Orchester that he had founded in 1953 of members of Munich orchestras and teachers of the Hochschule für Musik.

Hanns-Martin Schneidt was the choir's Artistic Director from 1984 to 2001. In 2005 conductor and organist Hansjörg Albrecht was chosen as his successor.

== Repertoire ==
The choir of about 80 voices performs cantatas, oratorios, Passions and a cappella music. Works of Johann Sebastian Bach dominate the repertoire, such as recordings of 75 Bach cantatas, They recorded Bach's Mass in B minor also with Hans-Martin Schneidt and his Christmas Oratorio in 2005 with Peter Schreier as both conductor and the Evangelist.

Works of other composers from Baroque to contemporary are performed as well. The choir has collaborated with conductors such as Bruno Weil, Leonard Bernstein and Oleg Caetani, with the Ballet of John Neumeier and with the Bayerisches Staatsorchester. In a concert for Bach's 260th anniversary of death, the choir performed Bernstein's Chichester Psalms and Louis Vierne's Messe solennelle for choir and two organs, op. 16, and Charles-Marie Widor's Mass for two choirs, two organs and brass, op. 36.
