= Erforsche mich, Gott, und erfahre mein Herz, BWV 136 =

1723 church cantata by Johann Sebastian Bach

Erforsche mich, Gott, und erfahre mein Herz
- BWV 136
- Church cantata by Johann Sebastian Bach
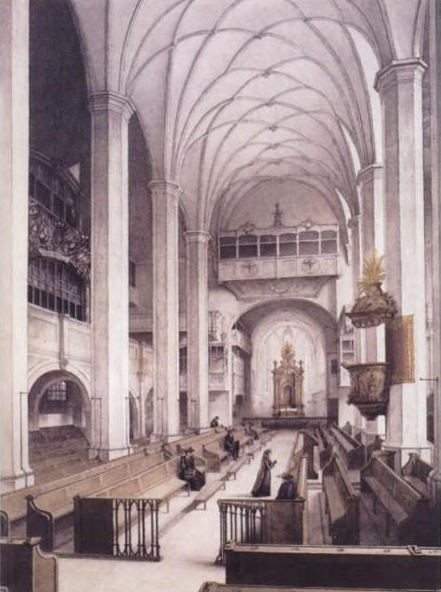
- Thomaskirche, Leipzig
- Related: Missa in A major
- Occasion: Eighth Sunday after Trinity
- Bible text: Psalm 139:23
- Chorale: Johann Heermann's "Wo soll ich fliehen hin"
- Performed: 18 July 1723: Leipzig
- Movements: 6
- Vocal: SATB choir; Solo: alto, tenor and bass
- Instrumental: corno; 2 oboes; oboe d'amore; 2 violins; viola; continuo

Erforsche mich, Gott, und erfahre mein Herz (Search me, God, and know my heart), BWV 136 is a church cantata by Johann Sebastian Bach. Bach composed the cantata in 1723 in Leipzig to be used for the eighth Sunday after Trinity. He led the first performance on 18 July 1723.

The work is part of Bach's first annual cycle of church cantatas; he began to compose cantatas for all occasions of the liturgical year when he took up office as Thomaskantor in May 1723. The cantata is structured in six movements: two choral movements at the beginning and end frame a sequence of alternating recitatives and arias. The opening movement is based on a verse from Psalm 139; the closing chorale on a stanza from Johann Heermann's hymn "Wo soll ich fliehen hin". The cantata is scored for three vocal soloists (alto, tenor and bass), a four-part choir, corno, two oboes, strings and basso continuo.

== History and words ==
When Bach took up office as Thomaskantor (director of church music) in Leipzig in May 1723 on the first Sunday after Trinity, he began to compose cantatas for all occasions of the liturgical year. He wrote Erforsche mich, Gott, und erfahre mein Herz for the Eighth Sunday after Trinity. The prescribed readings for the Sunday are from the Epistle to the Romans, "For as many as are led by the Spirit of God, they are the sons of God" (Romans 8:12–17), and from the Gospel of Matthew, the warning of false prophets from the Sermon on the Mount (Matthew 7:15–23). An unknown librettist wrote the text, closely related to the prescribed gospel. His text is the first in a group of ten cantatas following the same structure of biblical text – recitative – aria – recitative – aria – chorale. The ten cantatas were dedicated to the 8th to 14th and 21st to 22nd Sunday after Trinity and the second Sunday after Easter.

The opening chorus is based on Psalms 139:23, focused on the examination of the believer's heart by God. The closing chorale is the ninth stanza of Johann Heermann's hymn "Wo soll ich fliehen hin" (1630) on the melody of "Auf meinen lieben Gott", which Bach used again in 1724 as the base for his chorale cantata Wo soll ich fliehen hin, BWV 5.

The Bach scholar Alfred Dürr concludes from the autograph that only the middle section of the third movements and the chorale were composed in 1723 with certainty. The other parts may rely on a former unknown secular or church cantata, according to the conductor John Eliot Gardiner.

== Music ==
=== Structure and scoring ===
The cantata in six movements is scored for three vocal soloists (alto (A), tenor (T) and bass (B)), a four-part choir (SATB), corno (horn, Co), two oboes (Ob), two violins (Vl), viola (Va) and basso continuo (Bc). One oboe is marked "d'amore" (Oa) in the autograph kept by the Staatsbibliothek zu Berlin. The duration is given as 21 minutes. Some scholars, including Dürr and Gardiner, believe that the second oboe part in the choral movements 1 and 6 should also be played by oboe d'amore. The title on the original parts reads: "Domin: 8 post Trinit: / Erforsche mich Gott, und erfahre mein ect. / â / 4 Voci / Corno / 2 Hautbois / 2 Violini / Viola / e / Continuo / di Sign: / J.S.Bach".

In the following table of the movements, the scoring and keys and time signatures are taken from Alfred Dürr, using the symbol for common time (4/4). The instruments are shown separately for winds and strings, while the continuo, playing throughout, is not shown.

Movements of Erforsche mich, Gott, und erfahre mein Herz
No.	Title	Text	Type	Vocal	Winds	Strings	Key	Time
1	Erforsche mich, Gott, und erfahre mein Herz	Psalms 139:23	Chorus	SATB	Co 2Ob	2Vl Va	A major	12/8
2	Ach, daß der Fluch, so dort die Erde schlägt	anon.	Recitative	T				common time
3	Es kömmt ein Tag (Adagio); Denn seines Eifers Grimm vernichtet (Presto)	anon.	Aria	A	Oa		F-sharp minor	12/8
4	Die Himmel selber sind nicht rein	anon.	Recitative	B				common time
5	Uns treffen zwar der Sünden Flecken	anon.	Aria	T B		2Vl (unis.)	B minor	12/8
6	Dein Blut, der edle Saft	Heermann	Chorale	SATB	Co 2Ob	2Vl Va	B minor	common time

== Music ==
=== 1 ===
The opening chorus expands on a psalm verse, "Erforsche mich, Gott, und erfahre mein Herz" (Examine me, God, and discover my heart). The music in the style of a gigue expresses confidence facing the examination. In 1739 it was characterized by Johann Mattheson as "somewhat like the rapid arrow of a stream" ("etwa wie der glattfortschiessende Strom-Pfeil eines Bachs"). The movement is structured in two parts (A and A′), with choral fugues on the same themes, both presenting the complete text. An extended instrumental ritornello, dominated by the horn, is heard before, between and after the choral sections. The first fugue is preceded by a choral Devise (statement). Throughout the movement the two oboes never play independently but double the violins in the ritornelli and the soprano in the vocal sections. The virtuoso horn parts may have been intended for the exceptional Gottfried Reiche.

Bach reused the same material later in the "Cum Sancto Spiritu" of his Missa in A major.

=== 2 ===
A secco recitative, "Ach, daß der Fluch, so dort die Erde schlägt" (Alas, that the curse, which strikes the earth there), renders a contrasting change of mood. Bach interprets the curse of sin, and the hopeless situation of the humans and the threat of the Last Judgment in music full of dissonances.

=== 3 ===
The alto aria, "Es kömmt ein Tag" (A day will come), is accompanied by an oboe, an oboe d'amore according to Dürr and Gardiner. The middle section, "Denn seines Eifers Grimm vernichtet" (For the wrath of His vengeance will annihilate), was certainly composed in 1723. The first section is marked Adagio and in common time, contrasting to the middle section, marked with Presto and with a 12/8 time signature.

=== 4 ===
A secco recitative, "Die Himmel selber sind nicht rein" (The heavens themselves are not pure), tends to an arioso in the last measures.

=== 5 ===
The violins in unison accompany the duet of tenor and bass, "Uns treffen zwar der Sünden Flecken" (Indeed, the stains of sin cling to us). The voices sing sometimes in imitation, sometimes in homophony, in the style of duets Bach wrote at Köthen earlier in his career.

=== 6 ===
The chorale, "Dein Blut, der edle Saft" (Your blood, the noble juice), is expanded to five parts with a combination of the four-part chorus and an accompanying violin part, similar to the chorale of Erschallet, ihr Lieder, erklinget, ihr Saiten! BWV 172, written earlier by Bach for Pentecost 1714 in Weimar.

== Recordings ==
The entries to the following listing are taken from the selection on the Bach Cantatas Website. Instrumental groups playing period instruments in historically informed performances are marked green.

Recordings of Erforsche mich, Gott, und erfahre mein Herz
Title	Conductor / Choir / Orchestra	Soloists	Label	Year	Instr.
J. S. Bach: Cantatas BWV 136 & BWV 138	Diethard Hellmann Choir of Christuskirche, Mainz Bach-Orchester Mainz	Ortrun Wenkel; Theo Altmeyer; Gerhard Faulstich	Cantate	1960	
Die Bach Kantate Vol. 44	Helmuth Rilling Gächinger Kantorei Bach-Collegium Stuttgart	Helen Watts; Kurt Equiluz; Niklaus Tüller	Hänssler	1978	
J. S. Bach: Das Kantatenwerk · Complete Cantatas · Les Cantates, Folge / Vol. 34 – BWV 136–139	Nikolaus Harnoncourt Tölzer Knabenchor Concentus Musicus Wien	Paul Esswood; Kurt Equiluz; Walter Heldwein	Teldec	1983	Period
J. S. Bach: Complete Cantatas Vol. 7	Ton Koopman Amsterdam Baroque Choir Amsterdam Baroque Orchestra	Bogna Bartosz; Gerd Türk; Klaus Mertens	Antoine Marchand	1997	Period
J. S. Bach: Cantatas Vol. 11 – Cantatas from Leipzig 1723 IV	Masaaki Suzuki Bach Collegium Japan	Kai Wessel; Makoto Sakurada; Peter Kooy	BIS	1998	Period
Bach Edition Vol. 12 – Cantatas Vol. 15	Pieter Jan Leusink Holland Boys Choir Netherlands Bach Collegium	Sytse Buwalda; Nico van der Meel; Bas Ramselaar	Brilliant Classics	2000	Period
Bach Cantatas Vol. 5: Rendsburg/Braunschweig / For the 8th Sunday after Trinity / For the 10th Sunday after Trinity	John Eliot Gardiner Monteverdi Choir English Baroque Soloists	Robin Tyson; Christoph Genz; Brindley Sherratt	Soli Deo Gloria	2000	Period
J. S. Bach: Kantate BWV 136 Erforsche mich, Gott, und erfahre mein Herz	Rudolf Lutz Vocal ensemble of Schola Seconda Pratica Schola Seconda Pratica	Markus Forster; Johannes Kaleschke; Ekkehard Abele	Gallus Media	2011	Period
