= Was soll ich aus dir machen, Ephraim, BWV 89 =

Church cantata by Johann Sebastian Bach

Was soll ich aus dir machen, Ephraim
- BWV 89
- Church cantata by Johann Sebastian Bach
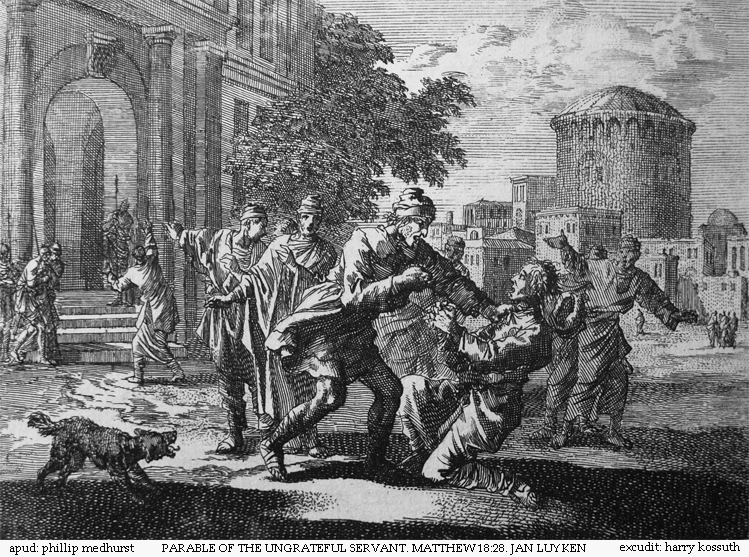
- The ungrateful servant, Jan Luyken etching in the Bowyer Bible
- Occasion: 22nd Sunday after Trinity
- Bible text: Hosea 11:8
- Chorale: "Wo soll ich fliehen hin" by Johann Heermann
- Performed: 24 October 1723: Leipzig
- Movements: 6
- Vocal: soprano, alto and bass soloists; SATB choir
- Instrumental: horn; 2 oboes; 2 violins; viola; continuo

Johann Sebastian Bach composed the church cantata Was soll ich aus dir machen, Ephraim (What shall I make of you, Ephraim), BWV 89, in Leipzig for the 22nd Sunday after Trinity and first performed it on 24 October 1723.

== History and words ==
Bach wrote the cantata in his first year in Leipzig for the 22nd Sunday after Trinity. The prescribed readings for the Sunday were from the Epistle to the Philippians, thanks and prayer for the congregation in Philippi (Philippians 1:3–11), and from the Gospel of Matthew, the parable of the unforgiving servant (Matthew 18:23–35).

The unknown poet of the cantata text stressed the opposites of the gospel, God's justice versus unjust men. The text begins with a related quotation from the prophet Hosea, Hosea 11:8. The next two movements, recitative and aria, reflect the sinful condition of man, another set of recitative and aria deals with God's mercy. The closing chorale is stanza 7 of "Wo soll ich fliehen hin" by Johann Heermann (1630), to the melody of "Auf meinen lieben Gott", which Bach would treat completely one year later in his chorale cantata Wo soll ich fliehen hin, BWV 5.

Bach first performed the cantata on 24 October 1723.

== Scoring and structure ==
The cantata in six movements is scored for three vocal soloists (soprano, alto and bass), a four-part choir only in the chorale, horn, two oboes, two violins, viola, and basso continuo.

1. Aria (bass): Was soll ich aus dir machen, Ephraim
2. Recitative (alto): Ja, freilich sollte Gott
3. Aria (alto): Ein unbarmherziges Gerichte
4. Recitative (soprano): Wohlan! mein Herze legt
5. Aria (soprano): Gerechter Gott, ach, rechnest du
6. Chorale: Mir mangelt zwar sehr viel

== Music ==
The cantata is scored like chamber music. Only the chorale is set for four parts; the alto voice sings of man's sin, the soprano of God's grace, and the bass is God's voice in the opening movement. On some copies of the parts, the movement is marked aria, although it is unknown if that marking was authorized by Bach. Formally it has some characteristics of an aria, such as a ritornello to open the movement and frame the text sections, and some aspects of an arioso, for example the free setting of the sections. The last section, which speaks of God's "meine Barmherzigkeit ist zu brünstig" (too fervent mercy) is embedded in the ritornello, then the ritornello is repeated once more. One motif in the ritornello is similar to one in the chorus "Lasset uns den nicht zerteilen" from Bach's St John Passion and may illustrate undecidedness in both cases. The following three movements, two recitatives and an expressive aria, are only accompanied by the continuo, the last aria also by an obbligato oboe. The closing chorale is set for four parts; the melody in the soprano is doubled by the horn, the oboes, and violin I.

== Recordings ==
- J. S. Bach: Kantaten · Cantatas Nr. 89, Nr. 90, Nr. 161, Jaap Schröder, Junge Kantorei, Concerto Amsterdam, Sheila Armstrong, Helen Watts, Max van Egmond, Telefunken 1969
- Die Bach Kantate Vol. 56, Helmuth Rilling, Gächinger Kantorei, Bach-Collegium Stuttgart, Arleen Augér, Helen Watts, Philippe Huttenlocher, Hänssler 1977
- J. S. Bach: Das Kantatenwerk – Sacred Cantatas Vol. 5, Gustav Leonhardt, Knabenchor Hannover, Leonhardt-Consort, soloist of the Knabenchor Hannover, Paul Esswood, Max van Egmond, Telefunken 1979
- J. S. Bach: Complete Cantatas Vol. 8, Ton Koopman, Amsterdam Baroque Orchestra & Choir, Dorothea Röschmann, Bogna Bartosz, Klaus Mertens, Antoine Marchand 1998
- Bach Edition Vol. 15 – Cantatas Vol. 8, Pieter Jan Leusink, Holland Boys Choir, Netherlands Bach Collegium, Ruth Holton, Sytse Buwalda, Bas Ramselaar, Brilliant Classics 2000
- Bach Cantatas Vol. 12: Bach Cantatas Vol. 12: Tooting/Winchester / For the 22nd Sunday after Trinity, John Eliot Gardiner, Monteverdi Choir, English Baroque Soloists, Joanne Lunn, Robin Tyson, Peter Harvey, Soli Deo Gloria 2000
- J. S. Bach: Cantatas Vol. 14 – Cantatas from Leipzig 1723, Masaaki Suzuki, Bach Collegium Japan, Midori Suzuki, Robin Blaze, Chiyuki Urano, BIS 2000

== Sources ==
- Was soll ich aus dir machen, Ephraim, BWV 89: performance by the Netherlands Bach Society (video and background information)
- Was soll ich aus dir machen, Ephraim, BWV 89: Scores at the International Music Score Library Project
- Was soll ich aus dir machen, Ephraim? BWV 89; BC A 155 / Sacred cantata (22nd Sunday after Trinity) Bach Digital
- Cantata BWV 89 Was soll ich aus dir machen, Ephraim? history, scoring, sources for text and music, translations to various languages, discography, discussion, Bach Cantatas Website
- BWV 89 Was soll ich aus dir machen, Ephraim? English translation, University of Vermont
- Chapter 24 BWV 89 Was soll ich aus dir machen, Ephraim? / What shall I do about you, Ephraim? Julian Mincham, 2010
