= Was willst du dich betrüben =

- Hymn
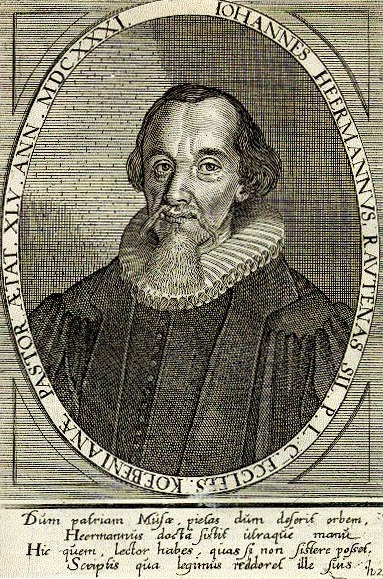
- The poet of the lyrics
- English: Why do you want to distress yourself
- Text: by Johann Heermann
- Language: German
- Published: 1630

"Was willst du dich betrüben" (Why do you want to distress yourself) is a hymn in seven stanzas by the German Baroque poet, Lutheran minister and hymn-writer Johann Heermann. The chorale was first published in 1630 during the Thirty Years' War. It is focused on trust in God, even when facing adversaries.

== History ==
Heermann, the hymn's poet, was influenced by the tract Buch von der deutschen Poeterey (Book of the German poetry) by Martin Opitz's, published in 1624, which defended German poetry and set guidelines on how German poetry should be composed.

Heermann lived in Köben, Silesia, when he wrote the hymn, an area which suffered under the war. The town was plundered four times. Several times, he lost his possessions and had to flee for his life. Nonetheless, in 1630 in Breslau (now Wrocław, Poland), Silesia, he published a volume of hymns, Devoti musica cordis, Hauss-und Herz-Musica (Latin, German: "music for a devout heart, house and heart music"), including Was willst du dich betrüben. The volume also contained "O Jesu Christe, wahres Licht! (O Christ, our true and only light), among "Songs of Tears" in a section "In the Time of the Persecution and Distress of Pious Christians", and "Herzliebster Jesu, was hast du verbrochen", "The Cause of the Bitter Sufferings of Jesus Christ, and the Comfort of His Love and Grace", which Johann Sebastian Bach chose as the first chorale in his St Matthew Passion. The volume contained in a section "A Few Prayers and Meditations" the hymn "O Gott, du frommer Gott" (O God, Thou faithful God), and "Herr, unser Gott, lass nicht zuschanden werden" (O Lord, our Father, shall we be confounded). A fourth edition of the volume in 1644 contained "Jesu, deine tiefen Wunde" (O what precious balm and healing), "Consolation from the wounds of Jesus in all manner of temptation. From the Manual of St. Augustine". These hymns have been described as "the first in which the correct and elegant versification of Opitz was applied to religious subjects, ... distinguished by great depth and tenderness of feeling, by an intense love of the Saviour, and earnest but not self-conscious humility".

== Structure and words ==
"Was willst du dich betrüben" is focused on trust in God, even when facing adversaries, including Satan.

The seven stanzas have eight lines each, in bar form (Stollen–Stollen–Abgesang). Each Stollen has two lines, the Abgesang has four, with a rhyme of the outer two lines (5 and 8), and the inner two (6 and 7).

1. Was willst du dich betrüben
2. Denn Gott verlässet keinen
3. Auf ihn magst du es wagen
4. Wenn auch gleich aus der Höllen
5. Er richts zu seinen Ehren
6. Drum ich mich ihm ergebe
7. Herr, gib, daß ich dein Ehre

The hymn opens, addressing the "liebe Seele" (beloved soul) of the speaker, such as some psalms do, for example Psalm 103, Psalms 103:1. This look at the individual differs from Martin Luther's approach in his hymn "Ein feste Burg ist unser Gott" ("A Mighty Fortress Is Our God"), written a century earlier, which covers a similar topic: trust in God against adversaries including Satan, called Teufel (devil) by Luther. The beginning is a paraphrase from Psalm 42, Psalms 42:5, in Luther's translation: "Was betrübst du dich, meine Seele, und bist so unruhig in mir? Harre auf Gott" (Why art thou cast down, O my soul? and why art thou disquieted in me? hope thou in God).

The central fourth stanza begins with strong words on Satan as an enemy: "Wenn auch gleich aus der Höllen / der Satan wollte sich / dir selbst entgegenstellen / und toben wider dich" (Even if, out of hell, Satan wishes to set himself against you, and vent his rage on you).

The final stanza includes as the fifth line "O Vater, Sohn und Geist" (Oh Father, Son and Spirit) as a miniature doxology.

== Tune ==
The text was sung on the melody of "Von Gott will ich nicht lassen". This tune is derived from a secular song, and is similar to the tune Monica, which was popular throughout Europe from the 16th century. The fifth line, the beginning line of the Abgesang, is highlighted, beginning an octave higher than the last note of the Stollen and leading to a rest, after which the other three lines are sung consecutively. Heermann seems to have written the text for that tune, because the climax of the words coincides with the climax of the melody in line 5 in most stanzas.

== Musical settings ==
Johann Sebastian composed the chorale cantata Was willst du dich betrüben, BWV 107, on the chorale's exact words in 1724, using the tune in common time in movement 1 and in 12/8 time in the final movement 7, both times with the vocal parts embedded in an instrumental concerto.
