= Was willst du dich betrüben, BWV 107 =

Chorale cantate by Johann Sebastian Bach

Was willst du dich betrüben
- BWV 107
- Chorale cantata by J. S. Bach
- Soprano part for the cantata
- Occasion: Seventh Sunday after Trinity
- Chorale: "Was willst du dich betrüben" by Johann Heermann
- Performed: 23 July 1724: Leipzig
- Movements: 7
- Vocal: SATB choir; solo: soprano, tenor and bass
- Instrumental: corno da caccia; 2 flauti traversi; 2 oboes d'amore; 2 violins; viola; continuo

Johann Sebastian Bach composed the church cantata Was willst du dich betrüben (Why would you grieve), BWV 107 in Leipzig for the seventh Sunday after Trinity and first performed on 23 July 1724. The chorale cantata is based on Johann Heermann's hymn in seven stanzas "Was willst du dich betrüben" (1630).

Bach structured the cantata, the seventh work in his chorale cantata cycle, in seven movements: two framing choral movements, a recitative and an unusual sequence of four bipartite arias. He scored the work for three vocal soloists, a four-part choir, and a Baroque chamber ensemble of a horn to reinforce the hymn tune in the outer movements, two transverse flutes, two oboes d'amore, strings and continuo. It is the only known work from his chorale cantata cycle that kept the original words unchanged.

== History and words ==
Bach composed the chorale cantata in Leipzig for the Seventh Sunday after Trinity. The prescribed readings for the Sunday are from the Epistle to the Romans, "I speak in human terms because of your human limitations ... the wages of sin is death; but the gift of God is eternal life" (Romans 6:19–23), and from the Gospel of Mark, the feeding of the 4000 (Mark 8:1–9).

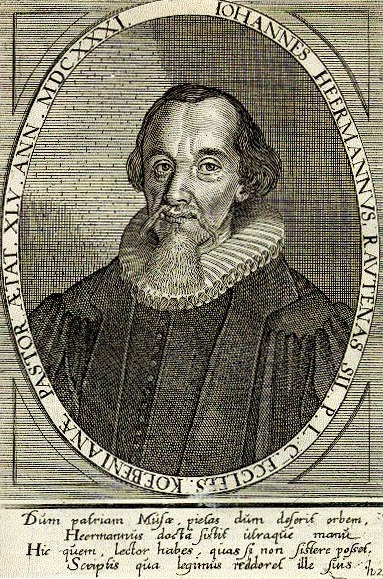
Johann Heermann, author of the chorale

The cantata is based on Johann Heermann's hymn in seven stanzas, "Was willst du dich betrüben" (1630), which is focused on trust in God, even when facing adversaries including the devil. Trust in God is also a theme of the Gospel. Unusually for a chorale cantata of the second cycle, the text is not changed in the middle movements, but kept per omnes versus (for all stanzas). The middle movements are, however, composed as a recitative and four arias. The treatment was decidedly old-fashioned in Bach's time. He had used it once much earlier in Christ lag in Todes Banden, BWV 4 (1707), and then again later, as in Gelobet sei der Herr, mein Gott, BWV 129 (1726), though it was not repeated during the second cycle. John Eliot Gardiner assumes that Bach imposed this restriction on himself, as he had done with the restriction to place the cantus firmus in soprano, alto, tenor and bass in the first four cantatas of the cycle. Gardiner comments on the "seventeenth-century design" of composing the unchanged chorale text, compared to settings of Stölzel, Telemann and Graupner:

But only Bach is prepared to make life consistently difficult for himself, as here, for example, by choosing to incorporate verbatim all seven stanzas of a rather obscure chorale by Johann Heermann from 1630. … Bach rises to the challenge: to overcome the limitations of being confined to a rigidly structured hymn without monotony or repetitiveness.

The chorales in Heermann's 1630 publication Devoti musica cordis (Music of a devoted heart), which also included "Herzliebster Jesu, was hast du verbrochen", the first chorale in Bach's St Matthew Passion, have been described as "the first in which the correct and elegant versification of Opitz was applied to religious subjects, … distinguished by great depth and tenderness of feeling, by an intense love of the Saviour, and earnest but not self-conscious humility".

Bach first performed the cantata, the seventh extant cantata of his second annual cycle, on 23 July 1724.

== Music ==
=== Scoring and structure ===
Bach structured the cantata in seven movements, beginning with a chorale fantasia and ending in a closing chorale, as usual in his chorale cantatas, but with an unusual sequence of only one recitative and four arias, setting the poetic hymn stanzas. He scored it for three vocal soloists (soprano (S), tenor (T) and bass) (B), a four-part choir, and a Baroque chamber ensemble of corno da caccia (Co) to support the chorale tune in the outer movements, two flauti traversi (Ft), two oboes d'amore (Oa), two violins (Vl), two violas (Va) and basso continuo (Bc).

In the following table of the movements, the scoring follows the Neue Bach-Ausgabe, the keys are given for the Weimar version. The time signature is provided using the symbol for common time (4/4).

Movements of Was willst du dich betrüben
No.	Title	Text	Type	Vocal	Winds	Strings	Key	Time
1	Was willst du dich betrüben	Heermann	Chorale fantasia	SATB	Co 2Ft 2Oa	2Vl 2Va	B minor	common time
2	Denn Gott verlässet keinen	Heermann	Recitative	B	2Oa		F-sharp minor	common time
3	Auf ihn magst du es wagen	Heermann	Aria	B		2Vl 2Va	A major	common time
4	Wenn auch gleich aus der Höllen	Heermann	Aria	T			E minor	3/4
5	Er richts zu seinen Ehren	Heermann	Aria	S	2Oa		B minor	12/8
6	Drum ich mich ihm ergebe	Heermann	Aria	T	2Ft		D major	common time
7	Herr, gib, daß ich dein Ehre	Heermann	Chorale	SATB	Co 2Ft 2Oa	2Vl 2Va	B minor	6/8

=== Movements ===
==== 1 ====
The opening chorus, "Was willst du dich betrüben" (Why do you wish to trouble yourself), is a chorale fantasia, with the vocal part embedded in an independent concerto of the instruments. The cantus firmus on the melody of "Von Gott will ich nicht lassen" is in long notes, partly embellished, in the soprano and horn; the lower voices are mostly set in homophony. The lines of the chorale are not rendered separately, but accenting the bar form (Stollen–Stollen–Abgesang) of the text, 1 and 2 are combined, 3 and 4 are combined, 5 is single and 6 to 8 are combined. The scoring is relatively rich in woodwinds.

==== 2 ====
The only recitative, "Denn Gott verlässet keinen, der sich auf ihn verläßt" (For God abandons none who entrust themselves to Him), is accompanied by the oboes d'amore, shows an extended melisma on the word "Freuden" (joy) and culminates in an arioso in the final line, with a melisma on retten (rescue). The following four stanzas are composed as arias, not as the typical da capo arias, but mostly in two parts. Bach achieves variation by changing voice type, key and time signature. He also varies the mode, alternating major and minor keys, expresses different affekts, and he successfully "blurs" the bar form of the stanzas.

==== 3 ====
The first aria, "Auf ihn magst du es wagen" (In Him you can dare all), depicts a "hunting scene" for bass and strings. Bach plays on the double meaning of the German word "erjagen", which in the text has the sense "achieve by great exertion", but he expresses the word's literal meaning ("to hunt") by an "outrageous hunting call trill" of the bass. This aria and those following are not da capo arias, but follow the bar form of the poem as bipartite structures.

==== 4 ====
The second aria, "Wenn auch gleich aus der Höllen" (Even if, out of hell), for tenor and continuo begins with strong words on Satan as an enemy: "Wenn auch gleich aus der Höllen / der Satan wollte sich / dir selbst entgegenstellen / und toben wider dich" ("Even if, out of hell, Satan wishes to set himself against you, and vent his rage on you"). Gardiner calls the music "a vivid pen-portrait of Satan and his wiles, delivered with typically Lutheran relish". The rhythm alternates between 6/8 and 3/4 one measure to the next, but the change is irregular and unpredictable. The bass line (marked organo e continuo) is "extravagantly animated and angular. Albert Schweitzer likens it to the contortions of a huge dragon".

==== 5 ====
The third aria, "Er richt's zu seinen Ehren" (He arranges for your honor), for soprano and the two oboes d'amore begins with an embellished version of the chorale tune, and the last line quotes the tune exactly on the words "was Gott will, das geschicht" ("What God wants, that happens").

==== 6 ====
The fourth aria, "Drum ich mich ihm ergebe" (Therefore, I devote myself to Him), is scored for tenor, the flutes in unison and muted violin. The melodic style is significantly different from the chorale melody, being song-like.

==== 7 ====
The closing chorale, "Herr, gib, daß ich dein Ehre" (Lord, grant that Your honor), is set in four parts for the voices, but embedded in a rich orchestral siciliano concerto. The lines of the chorale are grouped as in the first stanza, again highlighting line 5, "O Vater, Sohn und Geist" ("Oh Father, Son and Spirit") as a miniature doxology.

== Recordings ==
The table entries are excerpted from the list of recordings from the selection on the Bach Cantatas Website. Ensemble playing period instruments in historically informed performances are marked by green background.

Recordings of Was willst du dich betrüben
Title	Conductor / Choir / Orchestra	Soloists	Label	Year	Orch. type
Die Bach Kantate Vol. 43	Helmuth Rilling Gächinger Kantorei Bach-Collegium Stuttgart	Arleen Augér; Aldo Baldin; John Bröcheler	Hänssler	1979	
J. S. Bach: Das Kantatenwerk – Sacred Cantatas Vol. 6	Gustav Leonhardt: Knabenchor Hannover; Collegium Vocale Gent; Leonhardt-Consort	Soloist of the Knabenchor Hannover; Kurt Equiluz; Max van Egmond	Teldec	1980	Period
J.S. Bach: Cantatas	Philippe Herreweghe Collegium Vocale Gent	Agnès Mellon; Howard Crook; Peter Kooy	Virgin Classics	1991	Period
Bach Edition Vol. 11 – Cantatas Vol. 5	Pieter Jan Leusink Holland Boys Choir Netherlands Bach Collegium	Ruth Holton; Nico van der Meel; Bas Ramselaar	Brilliant Classics	1999	Period
J. S. Bach: Complete Cantatas Vol. 12	Ton Koopman Amsterdam Baroque Orchestra & Choir	Lisa Larsson; Christoph Prégardien; Klaus Mertens	Antoine Marchand	2000	Period
Bach Cantatas Vol. 4: Ansbach/Haddinton / For the 6th Sunday after Trinity / For the 7th Sunday after Trinity	John Eliot Gardiner Monteverdi Choir English Baroque Soloists	Katharine Fuge; Kobie van Rensburg; Stephan Loges	Soli	2000	Period
J.S. Bach: Cantatas Vol. 23 – Cantatas from Leipzig 1724	Masaaki Suzuki Bach Collegium Japan	Yukari Nonoshita; Makoto Sakurada; Peter Kooy	BIS	2002	Period
