= O Jesu Christe, wahres Licht =

Lutheran hymn

- Lutheran hymn
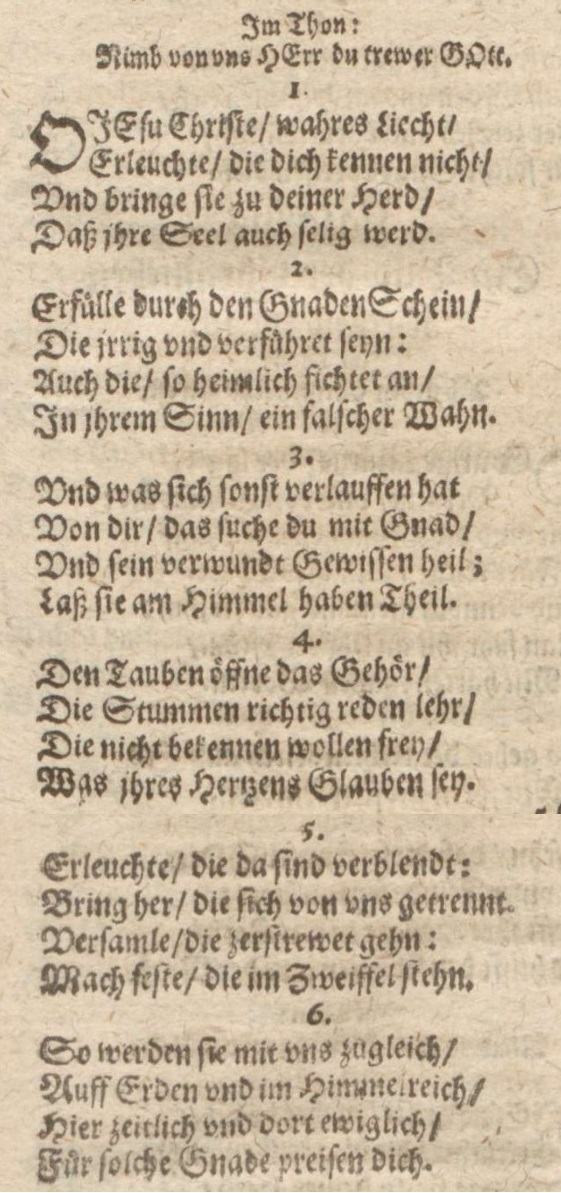
- The hymn in a 1636 print
- English: "O Christ, our true and only light"
- Written: 1630
- Text: by Johann Heermann
- Language: German

"O Jesu Christe, wahres Licht" (literally: O Jesus Christ, true light) is a Lutheran hymn by the German Baroque poet, Lutheran minister and hymn-writer Johann Heermann. The text was first published in 1630 during the Thirty Years' War. It is a prayer for enlightenment of those who are ignorant, and of those who turned away. It was associated with a melody from Nürnberg, dating to 1676. The hymn is part of modern German hymnals, both Protestant and Catholic. It was translated to English as "O Christ, our true and only light".

== History ==
The Lutheran theologian and pastor Johann Heermann, the hymn's poet, was influenced by the tract Buch von der deutschen Poeterey (Book of the German poetry) by Martin Opitz's, published in 1624, which defended German poetry and set guidelines on how German poetry should be composed.

Heermann lived in Köben, Silesia, when he wrote the hymn, an area which suffered under the war. The town was plundered four times. Several times, he lost his possessions and had to flee for his life. He and his congregation also suffered under the Counter-Reformation. Nonetheless, in 1630 in Breslau (now Wrocław, Poland), Silesia, he published a volume of hymns, Devoti musica cordis, Hauss-und Herz-Musica (Latin, German: "music for a devout heart, house and heart music"), including Was willst du dich betrüben. "O Jesu Christe, wahres Licht" appears among "Songs of Tears" in a section "In the Time of the Persecution and Distress of Pious Christians". The collection also contained "Herzliebster Jesu, was hast du verbrochen", which Johann Sebastian Bach chose as the first chorale in his St Matthew Passion. Heermann's hymns have been described as "the first in which the correct and elegant versification of Opitz was applied to religious subjects, ... distinguished by great depth and tenderness of feeling, by an intense love of the Saviour, and earnest but not self-conscious humility".

Although "O Jesu Christe, wahres Licht" was written as a "song of tears" for difficult times, it can be understood as a song for Epiphany. In Heermann's time, a sermon for Epiphany would recall the narration of the Three Kings but also call for the enlightenment of the heathen, the hymn's topic.

The first of several translations to English was made of the first two stanzas, "O Thou, the true and only Light", by W. Ball in 1836, which entered the Robinson's Church Psalter & Hymn Book in 1860, and other hymnals. Catherine Winkworth translated the hymn to "O Christ, our true and only Light", published in her Lyra Germanica in 1858. Other hymns sung to the same tune include "Jesus, thy blood and righteousness" and "Jesus, thy church with longing eyes", and "Volk Gottes, zünde Lichter an" (GL 374) by Peter Gerloff, a song for Purification (Darstellung des Herrn).

The hymn is part of the German Protestant hymnal Evangelisches Gesangbuch as EG 72. It is part of the German Catholic hymnal Gotteslob of 2013, as GL 485 in the section Ökumene (Ecumenism), omitting the second stanza. It is also part of other hymnals and songbooks.

== Text ==
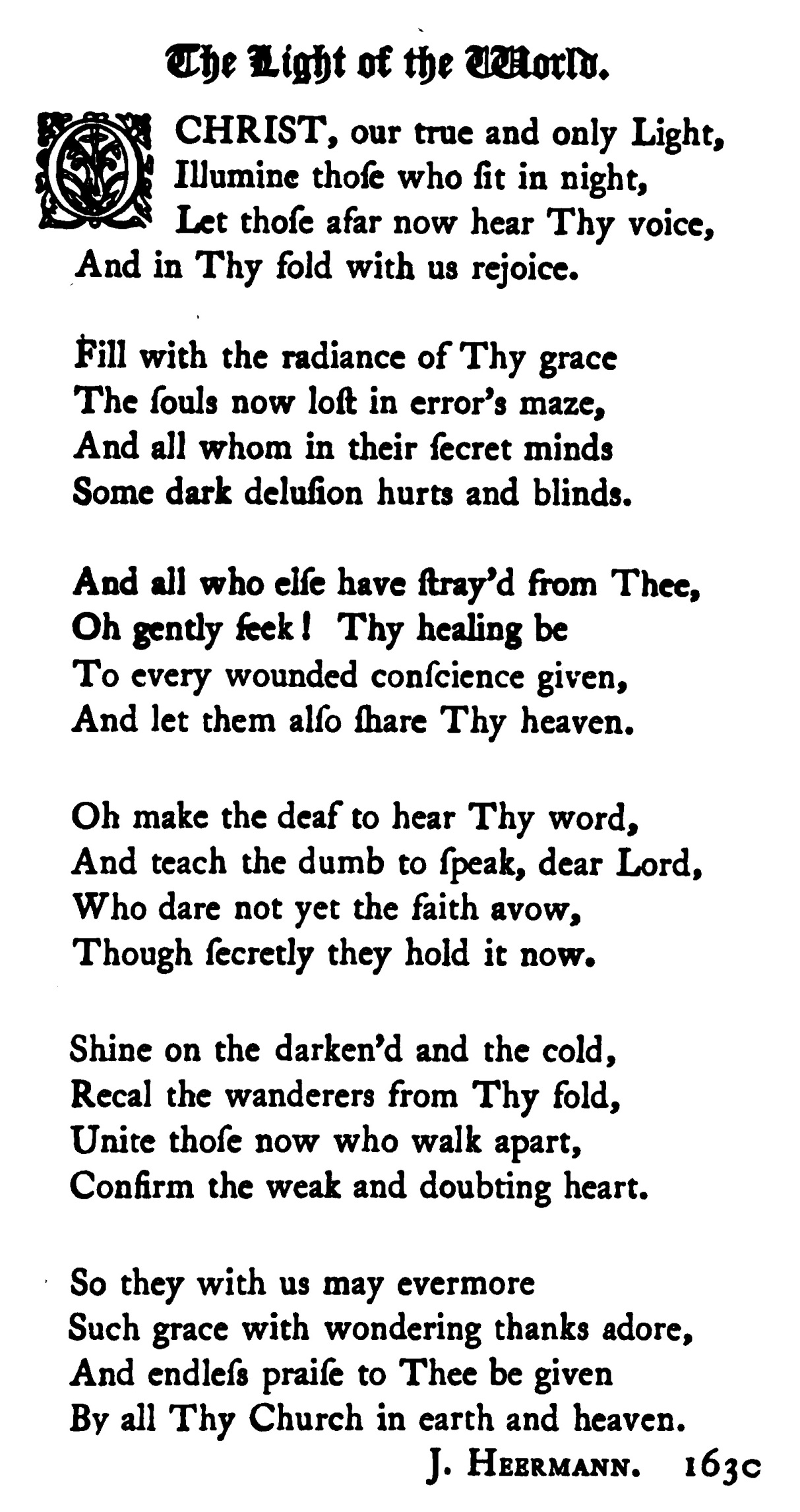
The translation by Winkworth, printed in 1879

"O Jesu Christe, wahres Licht" is in six stanzas of four lines each. Written in the first person plural, it addresses Jesus as the true light and prays for enlightenment and rescue for those outside of the community. The text is given as in modern hymnals, and in Winkworth's translation, which omitted the fourth stanza:

1) O Jesu Christe, wahres Licht,
erleuchte, die dich kennen nicht,
und bringe sie zu deiner Herd,
dass ihre Seel auch selig werd.

2) Erfülle mit dem Gnadenschein,
die in Irrtum verführet sein,
auch die, so heimlich ficht noch an
in ihrem Sinn ein falscher Wahn;

3) und was sich sonst verlaufen hat
von dir, das suche du mit Gnad
und ihr verwund’t Gewissen heil,
lass sie am Himmel haben teil.

4) Den Tauben öffne das Gehör,
die Stummen richtig reden lehr,
die nicht bekennen wollen frei,
was ihres Herzens Glaube sei.

5) Erleuchte, die da sind verblend’t,
bring her, die sich von uns getrennt,
versammle, die zerstreuet gehn,
mach feste, die im Zweifel stehn.

6) So werden sie mit uns zugleich
auf Erden und im Himmelreich
hier zeitlich und dort ewiglich
für solche Gnade preisen dich.

Translation:

O Christ, our true and only light,
Enlighten those who sit in night;
Let those afar now hear Your voice
And in Your fold with us rejoice.

Fill with the radiance of Your grace
The souls now lost in error's maze;
Enlighten those whose inmost minds
Some dark delusion haunts and blinds.

O gently call those gone astray
That they may find the saving way!
Let ev'ry conscience sore oppressed
In you find peace and heav'nly rest.

Oh make the deaf to hear Thy word,
and teach the dumb to speak, dear Lord,
Who dare not yet the faith avow,
Though secretly they hold it now.

Shine on the darkened and the cold;
Recall the wand'rers to Your fold.
Unite all those who walk apart;
Confirm the weak and doubting heart,

That they with us may evermore
Such grace with wond'ring thanks adore
And endless praise to You be giv'n
By all Your Church in earth and heav'n.

"O Jesu Christe, wahres Licht" addresses Jesus as the true light, and prays to enlighten the heathens, or the gentiles. The readings for the feast of the Epiphany are from the Book of Isaiah, "Arise, shine; for thy light is come, ... And the Gentiles shall come to thy light" (Isaiah 60:1–3) and the narration of the Three Kings (Matthew 2:1–12). Heermann interprets the heathen in the traditional way as those who do not know Jesus ("die dich kennen nicht") in the first stanza, but also, in the following four stanzas, as those who live in error ("Irrtum"), have gone astray ("verlaufen"), are delusioned ("verblendt"), separated ("getrennt"), dispersed ("zerstreuet") and in doubt ("im Zweifel"). His focus is on the latter group, meaning especially those who do not follow the teachings of the Reformation. The poet calls to pray for them, not to fight them. The final stanza is a short doxology, with the vision that all together may praise Jesus on Earth and in Heaven for his grace.

== Tune and musical settings ==
In early prints, the hymn was indicated to be sung to the melody of "Nimm von uns Herr, du treuer Gott". The text was combined from 1854 with a 1676 anonymous lively melody in triple metre from Nürnberg, which was first used for "Herr Jesu Christ, meins Lebens Licht". It became the tune for other hymns.

Felix Mendelssohn used two stanzas in his Paulus oratorio, which were translated by W. Ball for the English libretto in 1836. Max Beckschäfer composed a three-part vocal setting (SSA) with optional organ in 2012, with the melody in the middle voice.
