= Bringet dem Herrn Ehre seines Namens, BWV 148 =

Church cantata by Johann Sebastian Bach

Bringet dem Herrn Ehre seines Namens
- BWV 148
- Church cantata by J. S. Bach
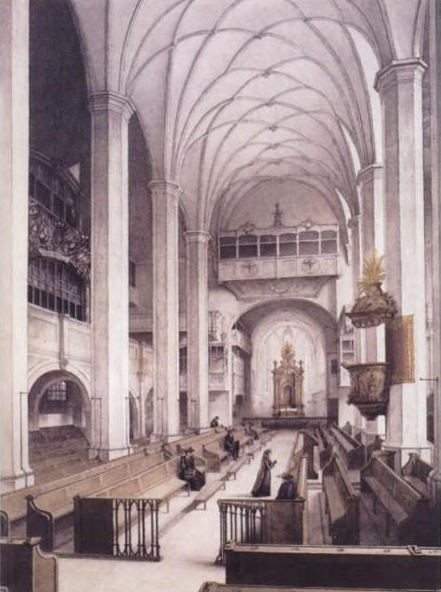
- Thomaskirche, Leipzig
- Occasion: 17th Sunday after Trinity
- Cantata text: Picander?
- Bible text: Psalms 29:2
- Composed: 1723 or 1725
- Movements: six
- Vocal: SATB choir; alto and tenor soloists
- Instrumental: 3 oboes; 2 violins; viola; continuo

Bringet dem Herrn Ehre seines Namens (Bring to the Lord the honor due His name), BWV 148, is a cantata by Johann Sebastian Bach, a church cantata for the 17th Sunday after Trinity. Bach composed it in Leipzig in 1723 or 1725.

== History and words ==
Bach wrote the cantata for the 17th Sunday after Trinity. The prescribed readings for the Sunday were from the Epistle to the Ephesians, the admonition to keep the unity of the Spirit (Ephesians 4:1–6), and from the Gospel of Luke, healing a man with dropsy on the Sabbath (Luke 14:1–11). The cantata text refers not to the healing, but to the honour due to God on the Sabbath. The words for the opening chorus are from Psalm 29 (Psalms 29:2). The lyrics of the cantata are based on a poem in six verses of Picander, "Weg, ihr irdischen Geschäfte", published in 1725 in his first spiritual book Erbauliche Gedanken. The Bach scholar Alfred Dürr nevertheless sees reason to date the cantata in 1723 already, suggesting that the cantata text may have preceded the poem.

The first recitative describes the desire for God as expressed in Psalm 42 (Psalms 42:1), "As the hart panteth after the water brooks, so panteth my soul after thee, O God." Only the melody of the source chorale "Auf meinen lieben Gott" (Lübeck, 1603) (used as the basis for the closing movement) is known. Some musicologists including Werner Neumann suggested the words of the fifth verse of that chorale, others such as Philipp Spitta and the edition of the Bach Gesellschaft preferred the final verse of Johann Heermann's hymn "Wo soll ich fliehen hin" (1630) which was sung to the same melody in Leipzig.

Bach first performed the cantata on 19 September 1723 or 23 September 1725.

== Scoring and structure ==
In accord with the festive theme, the cantata is scored for alto and tenor soloists, a four-part choir, and a Baroque instrumental ensemble of trumpet, three oboes, two violins, viola, and basso continuo. It is structured in six movements.

1. Chorus: Bringet dem Herrn Ehre seines Namen
2. Aria (tenor, violin): Ich eile, die Lehren des Lebens zu hören
3. Recitative (alto, strings): So wie der Hirsch nach frischem Wasser schreit
4. Aria (alto, oboes): Mund und Herze steht dir offen
5. Recitative (tenor): Bleib auch, mein Gott, in mir
6. Choral: Amen zu aller Stund

== Music ==
The opening chorus begins with as instrumental sinfonia, presenting the themes. The choir sings two fugues on different themes, but both derived from the beginning of the sinfonia. The trumpet plays a fifth part in the fugues. The movement concludes with the voices embedded in the sinfonia.

The solo violin in the first aria illustrates both the joy in God and the Eilen (running) mentioned in the words. The alto recitative is accompanied by the strings. In the following aria the mystical unity of the soul with God is expressed in the unusual scoring for two oboe d'amore and oboe da caccia. The closing chorale is set for four parts.

== Recordings ==
- J. S. Bach: Cantatas BWV 140 & BWV 148, Wolfgang Gönnenwein, Süddeutscher Madrigalchor, Consortium Musicum, Janet Baker, Theo Altmeyer, EMI 1967
- Bach Cantatas Vol. 4 – Sundays after Trinity I, Karl Richter, Münchener Bach-Chor, Münchener Bach-Orchester, Julia Hamari, Peter Schreier, Archiv Produktion 1977
- Die Bach Kantate Vol. 52, Helmuth Rilling, Gächinger Kantorei, Bach-Collegium Stuttgart, Helen Watts, Kurt Equiluz, Hänssler 1977
- J. S. Bach: Das Kantatenwerk – Sacred Cantatas Vol. 8, Nikolaus Harnoncourt, Tölzer Knabenchor, Concentus Musicus Wien, Leonhardt-Consort, Paul Esswood, Kurt Equiluz, Teldec 1985
- J. S. Bach: Complete Cantatas Vol. 7, Ton Koopman, Amsterdam Baroque Orchestra & Choir, Bogna Bartosz, Gerd Türk, Antoine Marchand 1997
- J. S. Bach: Cantatas Vol. 14 – Cantatas from Leipzig 1723, Masaaki Suzuki, Bach Collegium Japan, Robin Blaze, Gerd Türk, BIS 2000
- Bach Cantatas Vol. 4, John Eliot Gardiner, Monteverdi Choir, English Baroque Soloists, Frances Bourne, Mark Padmore, Soli Deo Gloria 2000

== Sources ==
- Bringet dem Herrn Ehre seines Namens, BWV 148: Scores at the International Music Score Library Project
- Bringet dem Herrn Ehre seines Namens BWV 148; BC A 140 / Sacred cantata (17th Sunday after Trinity ) Bach Digital
- Cantata BWV 148 Bringet dem Herrn Ehre seines Namens history, scoring, sources for text and music, translations to various languages, discography, discussion, Bach Cantatas Website
- BWV 148 Bringet dem Herrn Ehre seines Namens English translation, University of Vermont
- BWV 148 Bringet dem Herrn Ehre seines Namens text, scoring, University of Alberta
- Chapter 20 BWV 102 BWV 148 Bringet dem Herrn Ehre seines Namens / Give the Lord the glory of His name. Julian Mincham, 2010
- Gardiner, John Eliot (2009). Johann Sebastian Bach (1685-1750) / Cantatas Nos 47, 96, 114, 116, 148 & 169 (Media notes). Soli Deo Gloria (at Hyperion Records website).
- Luke Dahn: BWV 148.6 bach-chorales.com
