= Eleven Chorale Preludes =

Compositions for organ by Johannes Brahms

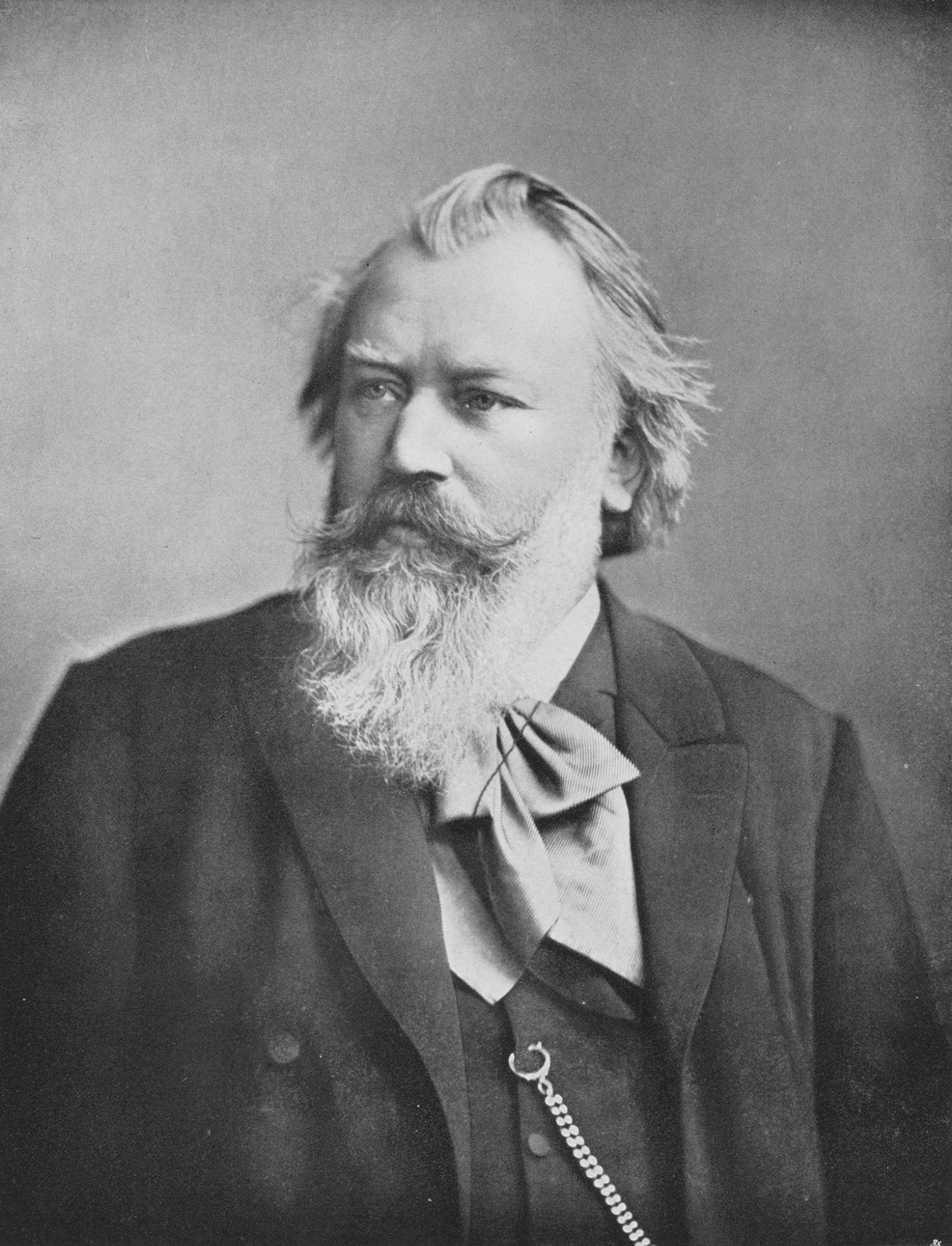
Portrait of Johannes Brahms, 1889

Eleven Chorale Preludes, Op. 122, is a collection of works for organ by Johannes Brahms, written in 1896, at the end of the composer's life, immediately after the death of his beloved friend, Clara Schumann, published posthumously in 1902. They are based on verses of nine Lutheran chorales, two of them set twice, and are relatively short, compact miniatures. They were the last compositions Brahms ever wrote, composed around the time that he became aware of the cancer that would ultimately prove fatal; thus the final piece is a second setting of "O Welt, ich muß dich lassen."

7. "O Gott, du frommer Gott"
Performed by Matthias Flierl

1. Mein Jesu, der du mich (My Jesus. who [chose] me) in E minor
2. Herzliebster Jesu, was hast du verbrochen (O dearest Jesu) in G minor
3. O Welt, ich muß dich lassen (O world, I must leave you) in F major
4. Herzlich tut mich erfreuen (My heart is filled) in D major
5. Schmücke dich, o liebe Seele (Deck yourself, O dear soul) in E major
6. O wie selig seid ihr doch, ihr Frommen (O how blessed are you pious ones) in D minor
7. O Gott, du frommer Gott (O God, you faithful God) in A minor
8. Es ist ein Ros’ entsprungen (It is an upspringing rose) in F major
9. Herzlich tut mich verlangen (I am heartily longing) in A minor
10. Herzlich tut mich verlangen (second setting) in A minor
11. O Welt, ich muß dich lassen (second setting) in F major

== Transcriptions ==
Preludes 4, 5, and 8–11 were transcribed for solo piano by Ferruccio Busoni in 1902 as BV B 50. These transcriptions have been recorded by Paul Jacobs, Wolf Harden, Lydia Artymiw, Igor Levit, and Samson Tsoy.
