= Chiyuki Urano =

Japanese classical baritone and bass singer

- Born: Japan
- Occupation(s): Classical baritone and bass
- Organizations: Bach Collegium Japan

Chiyuki Urano (浦野 智行) is a Japanese classical baritone and bass who has appeared in concert and recital.

Urano studied at the Tokyo National University of Fine Arts and Music and was awarded prizes at several competitions. He has recorded cantatas and other compositions by Johann Sebastian Bach with the Bach Collegium Japan conducted by Masaaki Suzuki, both as a soloist and a member of the ensemble. With the ensemble, he recorded in 1998 the vox Christi (voice of Christ) in Bach's St John Passion, with Gerd Türk as the Evangelist and Peter Kooy singing the bass roles and arias, in a recording praised by one critic as "the essential version of this work", and by another as "the best I've ever encountered". A year later, he recorded the bass roles and arias in Bach's St Matthew Passion, while Kooy was the vox Christi, and Türk again the Evangelist. He recorded in 2000 with them the bass solos in volume 14 of the complete Bach cantata cycle, in Was soll ich aus dir machen, Ephraim, BWV 89, alongside Midori Suzuki and Robin Blaze. He recorded in 2004 two oratorios by Bach, the Easter Oratorio (Kommt, eilet und laufet), BWV 249, and the Ascension Oratorio (Lobet Gott in seinen Reichen), BWV 11, alongside Yukari Noonoshita, Patrick Van Goethem and Jan Kobow.

Urano recorded with composer and pianist Lera Auerbach a collection of Russian art songs called Tolstoy's Waltz, of works by Russians who are known in different fields than music. Leo Tolstoy composed a waltz in his 20s, while other featured works were composed by the writer Boris Pasternak, the ballet directors Sergei Diaghilev and George Balanchine, the artists Vasily Polenov and Pavel Fedotov, and the diplomat Aleksandr Griboyedov. Urano sings five songs, two by Polenow, two by Fedotov and one by Diaghilev. A review notes that he "has a warm, effortless voice and good Russian pronunciation".
