= Wo soll ich fliehen hin =

- German Lutheran hymn
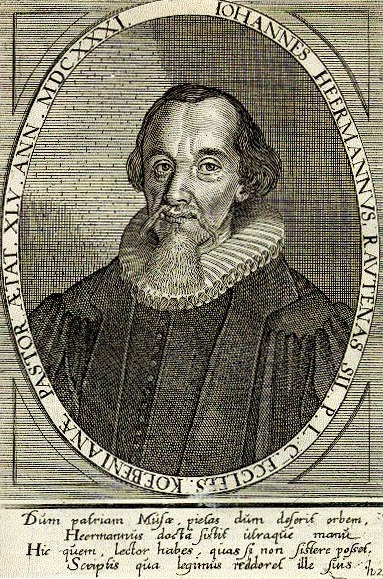
- The hymn-writer
- Catalogue: Zahn 2164
- Text: by Johann Heermann
- Language: German
- Published: 1630

"Wo soll ich fliehen hin" (Where should I flee) is a hymn in seven stanzas by the German Baroque poet, Lutheran minister and hymn-writer Johann Heermann. It was first published in 1630 during the Thirty Years' War. It is a penitential hymn for Lent.

== History ==
Heermann, the hymn's poet, was influenced by the tract Buch von der deutschen Poeterey (Book of the German poetry) by Martin Opitz's, published in 1624, which defended German poetry and set guidelines on how German poetry should be composed.

Heermann lived in Köben, Silesia, when he wrote the hymn, an area which suffered under the war. The town was plundered four times. Several times, he lost his possessions and had to flee for his life. Nonetheless, in 1630 in Breslau (now Wrocław, Poland), Silesia, he published a volume of hymns, Devoti musica cordis, Hauss-und Herz-Musica (Latin, German: "music for a devout heart, house and heart music"), including "Wo soll ich fliehen hin". The volume also contained the Passion hymn "Herzliebster Jesu, was hast du verbrochen". These hymns have been described as "the first in which the correct and elegant versification of Opitz was applied to religious subjects, ... distinguished by great depth and tenderness of feeling, by an intense love of the Saviour, and earnest but not self-conscious humility".

Wo soll ich fliehen hin is in twelve stanzas of 6 lines each.

== Melody and settings ==
"Wo soll ich fliehen hin" is sung to the hymn tune of "Auf meinen lieben Gott", Zahn No. 2164.

Johann Sebastian composed the chorale cantata Wo soll ich fliehen hin, BWV 5, based on the hymn. He used the tune in a chorale fantasia in the opening movement, as an oboe line in an alto recitative, and in a four-part setting as the closing chorale.
