= Stefan Zweig Collection =

British Library collection based on items possessed by the author

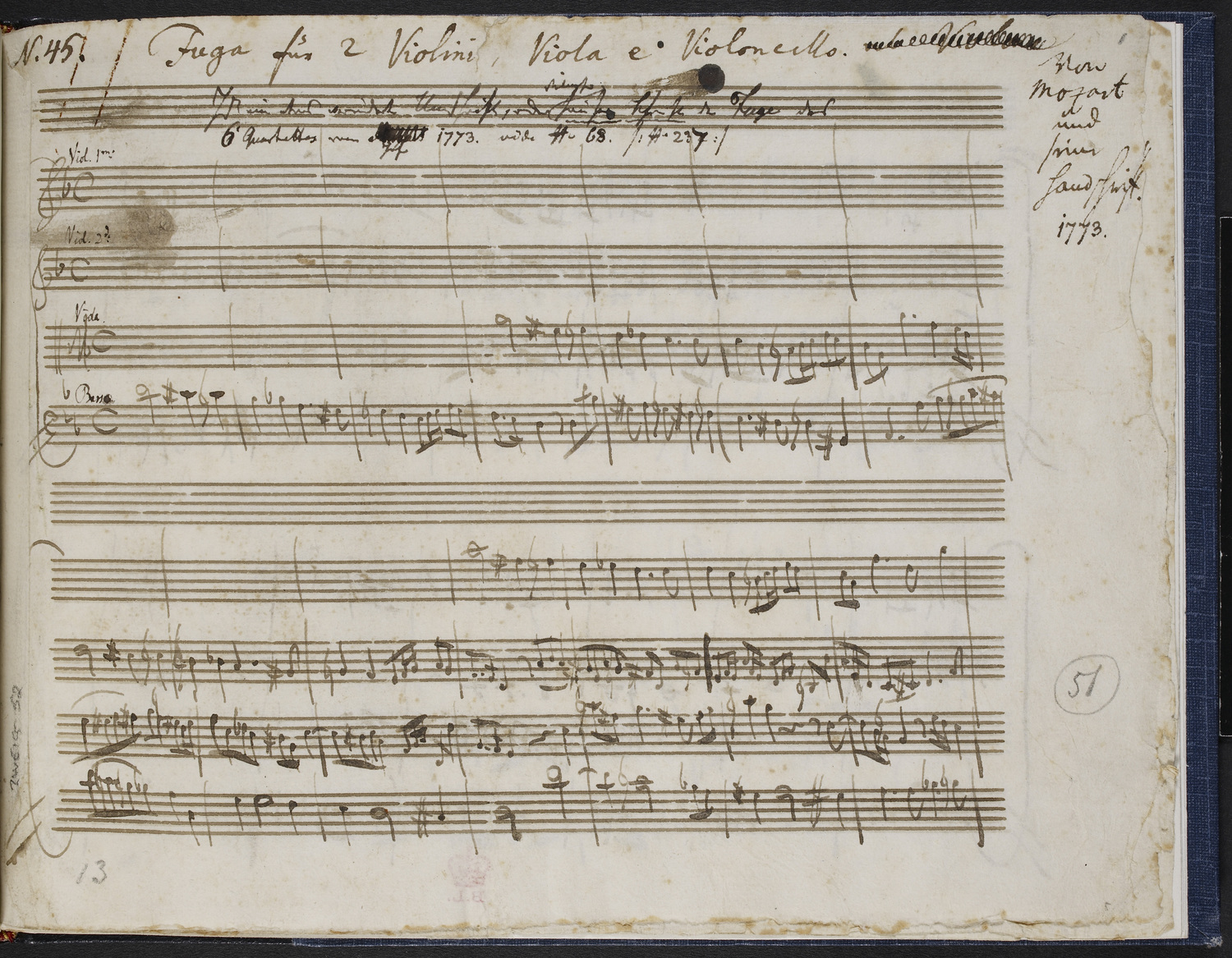
Zweig MS 52, f. 1r; Mozart's Fuga from Quartet in D minor (K 173)

The Stefan Zweig Collection is an important collection of autograph manuscripts formed by the Austrian writer Stefan Zweig. After his death in 1942 his heirs continued to develop the collection, and donated it to the British Library in 1986. The collection includes many literary and music manuscripts, mainly in the composers' own hands.

The collection contains 206 numbered items: MS 1-131 are musical manuscripts, MS 132-200 and MS 206 are literary or historical manuscripts, and MS 201-205 are printed books and music. Most of the musical manuscripts have been digitised.

== Musical manuscripts ==
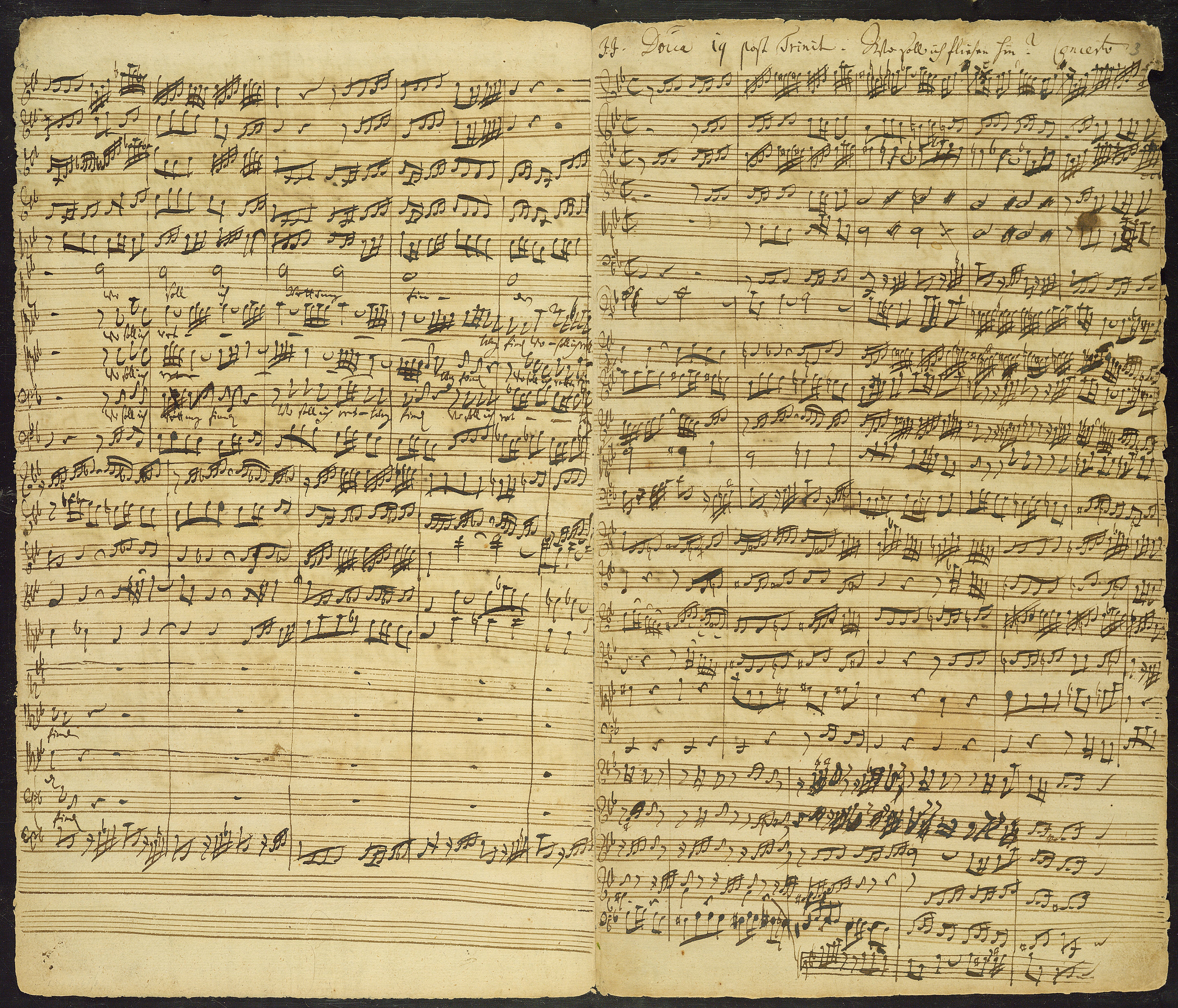
Opening of the first movement of Bach's autograph manuscript for his cantata Wo soll ich fliehen hin (BWV 5 (Note: "BWV" is Bach-Werke-Verzeichnis, a thematic catalogue of Bach's works.))

The bulk of the collection consists of 131 autograph manuscripts by notable composers; most, but not all, are musical scores.

One particularly prominent item is Mozart's "Verzeichnüß aller meiner Werke" (MS 63), his own handwritten thematic catalogue of his works from 1784 to 1791. As well as many Mozart manuscripts, a range of prominent composers is represented, including Johann Sebastian Bach, Joseph Haydn, George Frideric Handel, and Johannes Brahms. Unusual pieces include a piano duet by Friedrich Nietzsche (MS 71).

== Other autographs ==
The 69 historic or literary manuscripts in the collection date from 1542 to 1940, and include material from individuals as diverse as Martin Luther (MS 200), Jules Verne (MS 197), John Locke (MS 168), Johann Wolfgang Goethe (MS 152–155), Adolf Hitler (MS 158), Sigmund Freud (MS150) and Henrik Ibsen (MS 162).

Zweig MS 206 was given separately from the main collection, in 1989, and is a manuscript of a biography of Luca Signorelli by Giorgio Vasari, copied from Lives of the Most Excellent Painters, Sculptors, and Architects.

== Other material ==
The remaining five items in the collection include editions of Rimbaud, Cervantes, and a two-volume printed edition of Schubert's vocal music.

== Other collections related to Stefan Zweig ==
Reed Library at the State University of New York at Fredonia has a large collection of Zweig's letters in their own Stefan Zweig Collection.
