= St. Paul (oratorio) =

Oratorio by Mendelssohn

- Oratorio by Felix Mendelssohn
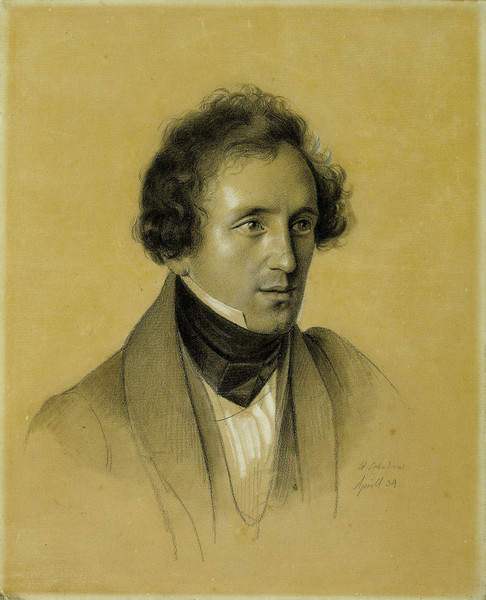
- The composer by Friedrich Wilhelm Schadow, 1834
- English: St. Paul
- Native name: Paulus
- Opus: 36
- Text: Julius Schubring
- Language: German
- Based on: Life of St. Paul in biblical narration
- Performed: 22 May 1836: Düsseldorf
- Movements: 45
- Scoring: Soprano, alto, tenor and 2 bass soloists; SATB choir; orchestra

St. Paul (in German Paulus), Op. 36, is an oratorio by Felix Mendelssohn. The composer oversaw versions and performances in both German and English within months of completing the music in early 1836.

== Background ==
The libretto "after words of holy scripture" was begun in 1832. The composer with pastor Julius Schubring, a childhood friend, compiled passages from the New Testament, chiefly the Acts of the Apostles, and the Old, as well as the texts of chorales and hymns, in a polyglot manner after Bach's model. Composition of the music started in 1834 and was complete in early 1836.

== Performances ==
The work was premiered on 22 May 1836 (having been completed in April of that year) at the Lower Rhenish Music Festival in Düsseldorf. The English premiere was in Liverpool on 3 October 1836 in a translation by Mendelssohn's friend, Karl Klingermann. Contralto Mary Shaw was one of the soloists at the English premiere. The first performance in the United States was in Boston on March 14, 1837. Mendelssohn himself conducted the first performance in Leipzig in the Paulinerkirche on 16 March 1837. Numerous performances followed in Europe and in the United States. It was performed for inauguration of the Academy of Music (then known as Music Hall) in Milwaukee, Wisconsin on January 31, 1865.

During Mendelssohn's lifetime, St. Paul was a popular and frequently performed work. Today it is regularly performed in Germany and well disseminated in both of its original languages through an array of complete recordings.

== Instrumentation ==
- solo voice: soprano, alto, tenor, 2 basses (SATBB)
- mixed (SATB) and either children's or women's choruses
- 2 flutes, 2 oboes, 2 clarinets, 2 bassoons, contrabassoon and serpent (predecessor of the ophicleide now replaced by a tuba), 4 horns, 2 trumpets, 3 trombones (alto, tenor and bass), timpani, strings and organ

== Structure ==
=== Part One ===
APPEAL AND DOXOLOGY

1. Overture
2. Chorus — Herr! Der du bist Gott (Lord, thou alone art God)
3. Chorale — Allein Gott in der Höh' sei Ehr' (To God on high be thanks and praise)

SCENE ONE — STONING OF STEPHEN

4. Recitative & Duet — Die Menge der Gläubigen (And the many that believed were of one heart)
5. Chorus — Dieser Mensch hört nicht auf (Now this man ceaseth not)
6. Recitative & Chorus — Und sie sahen auf ihn (And all that sat in the council)
7. Aria (S) — Jerusalem! Die du tötest die Propheten (Jerusalem! thou that killed the Prophets)
8. Recitative & Chorus — Sie aber stürmten auf ihn ein; Steiniget ihn! (Then they ran upon him; Stone him!)
9. Recitative & Chorale — Und sie steinigten ihn; Dir, Herr, dir (And they stoned him; To thee, O Lord)
10. Recitative — Und die Zeugen legten ab ihre Kleider (And the witnesses)
11. Chorus — Siehe! wir preisen selig (Happy and blest are they)

SCENE TWO — CONVERSION AND BAPTISM OF SAUL (PAUL)

12. Recitative (T) & Aria (B) — Saulus aber zerstörte die Gemeinde (And Saul made havock of the Church)
13. Recitative & Arioso (S) — Und zog mit einer Schar (But the Lord is mindful of his own)
14. Recitative & Chorus — Und als er auf dem Weg war; Saul! was verfolgst du mich? (And as he was on the way; Saul, why do you persecute me?)
15. Chorus — Mache dich auf! Werde Licht! (Arise! Let there be light!)
16. Chorale — Wachet auf! ruft uns die Stimme (Awake, calls the voice to us)
17. Recitative — Die Männer aber, die seine Gefährten waren (And his companions)
18. Aria (B) — Gott, sei mir gnädig (O God, have Mercy)
19. Recitative — Es war aber ein Jünger (And there was a Disciple)
20. Aria (B) & Chorus — Ich danke dir, Herr, mein Gott (I praise thee, O Lord)
21. Recitative — Und Ananias ging hin (And Ananias went his way)
22. Chorus — O welch eine Tiefe des Reichtums (O great is the depth)

=== Part Two ===
SCENE THREE — MISSION OF PAUL AND BARNABAS

23. Chorus — Der Erdkreis ist nun des Herrn (The nations are now the Lord's)
24. Recitative (S) — Und Paulus kam (And Paul came to the congregation)
25. Duettino (TB) — So sind wir nun Botschafter (Now we are ambassadors)
26. Chorus — Wie lieblich sind die Boten (How lovely are the messengers)
27. Recitative & Arioso (S) — Und wie sie ausgesandt von dem heiligen Geist (I will sing of thy great mercies)

SCENE FOUR — PERSECUTION OF PAUL BY HIS FORMER FELLOW BELIEVERS

28. Recitative (T) & Chorus — Da aber die Juden das Volk sahen (But when the Jews; Thus saith the Lord)
29. Chorus & Chorale — Ist das nicht; O Jesu Christe, wahres Licht (Is this he?; O Thou, the true and only light)
30. Recitative (TB) — Paulus aber und Barnabas sprachen (But Paul and Barnabas spoke freely)
31. Duet (TB) — Denn also hat uns der Herr geboten (For so hath the Lord)
32. Recitative (S) — Und es war ein Mann zu Lystra (And there was a man at Lystra)
33. Chorus — Die Götter sind den Menschen gleich geworden (The gods themselves)
34. Recitative (A) — Und nannten Barnabas Jupiter (And they called Barnabas Jupiter)
35. Chorus — Seid uns gnädig (O be gracious, ye immortals)
36. Recitative (TB), Aria (B) & Chorus — Da das die Apostel hörten (Now when the Apostles; For know ye not?)
37. Recitative (S) — Da ward das Volk erreget (Then the multitude)
38. Chorus — Hier ist des Herren Tempel (This is the Lord's temple)
39. Recitative (S) — Und sie alle verfolgten Paulus (And they all persecuted Paul)
40. Cavatina (T) — Sei getreu bis in den Tod (Be though faithful unto death)

SCENE FIVE — FAREWELL OF PAUL FROM EPHESUS

41. Recitative (SB) — Paulus sandte hin (And Paul sent and called the elders)
42. Chorus & Recitative (SATB) — Schone doch deiner selbst (Far be it from thy path)
43. Chorus — Sehet, welch eine Liebe (See what love)

SCENE SIX — MARTYRDOM OF PAUL

44. Recitative (S) — Und wenn er gleich geopfert wird (And though he be offered)
45. Chorus — Nicht aber ihm allein (Not only unto him)

== Recordings ==
- Helen Donath, Hanna Schwarz, Werner Hollweg, Dietrich Fischer-Dieskau, Düsseldorf Musikverein Choir and the Düsseldorfer Symphoniker conducted by Rafael Frühbeck de Burgos — October 1976 — EMI Electrola
- Paulus — Rachel Yakar, Brigitte Balleys, Markus Schäfer, Thomas Hampson, Choeur Symphonique et Orchestre de la Fondation Gulbenkian conducted by Michel Corboz — July 1986 — Erato ECD 75350
- Gundula Janowitz, Rosemarie Lang, Hans Peter Blochwitz, Theo Adam, Gewandhaus Children's Choir, Leipzig Radio Chorus and the Gewandhaus Orchestra conducted by Kurt Masur — December 1986 — Philips
- Agnes Giebel, Mariko Sasaki, Shogo Miyahara, Heinrich-Schütz-Chor Tokyo, Ensemble Claudio and the Symphonia Musica Poetica conducted by Yumiko Tanno — live in Tokyo in 1993 — ALM Records ALCD 1098-99
- Juliane Banse, Ingeborg Danz, Michael Schade, Andreas Schmidt, Gächinger Kantorei, Prague Chamber Choir and the Czech Philharmonic conducted by Helmuth Rilling — November 17–19, 1994 — Hänssler Classic
- Soile Isokoski, Mechthild Bach, Rainer Trost, Peter Lika, Das Neue Orchester, Chorus Musicus Köln, conducted by Christoph Spering - 1995 - Opus 111
- Melanie Diener, Annette Markert, James Taylor, Matthias Goerne, Chorus of La Chapelle Royale, Chorus of the Collegium Vocale and the Orchestre des Champs-Élysées conducted by Philippe Herreweghe — live in Montreux on October 30 and November 1, 1995 — Harmonia Mundi
- Susan Roberts, Ruby Philogene, Glenn Siebert, Mark Beesley, the Royal Scottish National Chorus and the Royal Scottish National Orchestra conducted by Leon Botstein — 1997 — Arabesque Z-6705
- Susan Gritton, Jean Rigby, Barry Banks, Peter Coleman-Wright, BBC National Chorus of Wales and the BBC National Orchestra of Wales conducted by Richard Hickox — live in Cardiff on May 5, 2000 — Chandos
- Saint Paul] (in English) — Natalie Griffin Mitchell, Susan Fleming, Scot Cameron, David Robinson, Briarwood Chancel Choir and the Alabama Philharmonic conducted by Clay Campbell — May 16–18, 2005 — Resmiranda
- María Cristina Kiehr (soprano and alto solos), Werner Güra, Michael Volle, Kammerchor Stuttgart and the Deutsche Kammerphilharmonie Bremen conducted by Frieder Bernius — September 16–19, 2005 — Carus-Verlag
- Sabine Goetz, Dorothée Zimmermann, Markus Brutscher, Klaus Mertens, Kantorei der Schlosskirche Weilburg and the Capella Weilburgensis conducted by Doris Hagel — September 18–22, 2008 — Hänssler Classic
- Alexandra Coku, Kelley O'Connor, Scott Williamson, Paul Gay, Bard Festival Chorale and the American Symphony Orchestra conducted by Leon Botstein — August 9, 2009 — ASO 227
- Heejoo Kwon, Jina Oh, Ferdinand Keller, Mathias Hagenah, Samuel Kirsch, Simon Amend, UniChor Mainz and the UniOrchester Mainz conducted by Felix Koch — February 3, 2018 — Collegium Musicum
- Julia Kleiter, Wiebke Lehmkuhl, Werner Güra, Georg Zeppenfeld, MDR Rundfunkchor and the Gewandhausorchester, conducted by Andris Nelsons — February 2023 — Deutsche Grammophon 486 8178
