= Johannes Kaleschke =

German opera singer

Johannes Kaleschke (born 1977) is a German classical tenor in opera and in concert.

Kaleschke was born in Speyer. He first studied German history and art history, then voice at the Musikhochschule Stuttgart with Bernhard Jaeger-Böhm, completing in 2002. He took master classes with Francisco Araiza.

Kaleschke recorded Bach cantatas with Rudolf Lutz. He appeared as the Evangelist in Mauricio Kagel's Sankt-Bach-Passion. He appeared on stage in Carl Orff's Der Mond at the Ludwigsburg Festival, and at the Kammertheater der Staatsoper Stuttgart, where he appeared in Bernhard Koenig's Expedition zur Erde. He performed in an award-winning recording of Jan Dismas Zelenka's Missa votiva with the Stuttgarter Kammerchor, conducted by Frieder Bernius, for the Carus-Verlag.

He has been a permanent member of SWR Vokalensemble Stuttgart since 2009.
