= Sankt-Bach-Passion =

- Oratorio by Mauricio Kagel
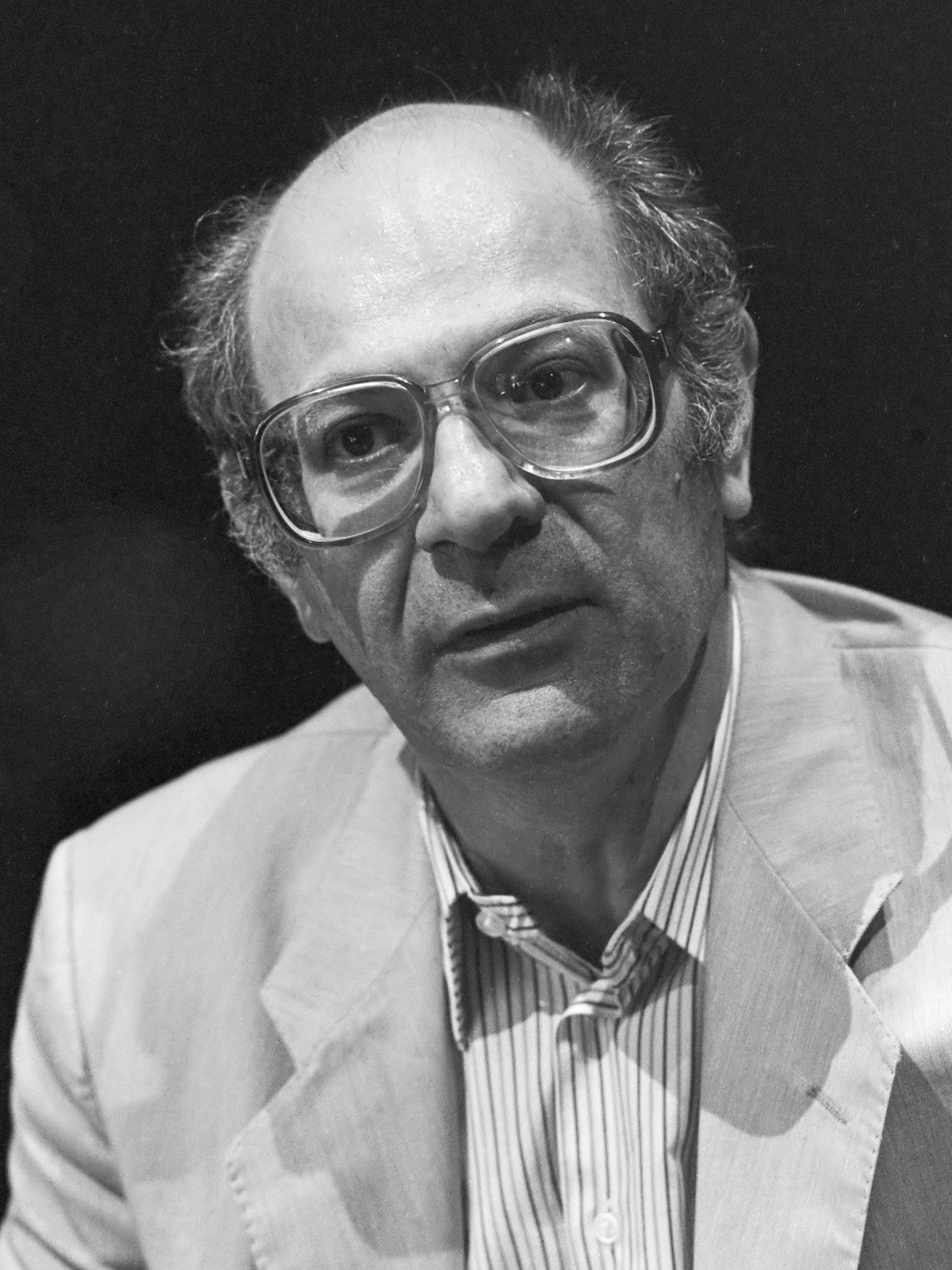
- The composer in the year of the premiere
- Occasion: tercentary of Bach's birth
- Language: German
- Based on: Bach's life in texts from his time
- Performed: November 1985: Berlin
- Scoring: mezzo-soprano, tenor and baritone soloists; narrator; children's choir; SATB choir; organ; orchestra

Sankt-Bach-Passion (Saint Bach Passion) is an oratorio composed by Mauricio Kagel in 1985 for the tricentenary of the birth of Johann Sebastian Bach. It follows the model of Bach's Passions, but the topic is not biblical, rather refers to Bach's biography. The text includes documents such as Bach's letters to patrons, and excerpts from contemporary biographies. The work is an extended oratorio for soloists, choir, and orchestra. It was premiered in Berlin in 1985, conducted by the composer, and recorded shortly afterwards by the same performers.

== History ==
Mauricio Kagel received the commission for Sankt-Bach-Passion in 1981. He conceived a work which follows the model of Bach's Passions, but referring to Bach's biography, which is told in contemporary texts, such as his letters to patrons, and excerpts from biographies. Kagel set the text as an oratorio for soloists (mezzosoprano, tenor, and baritone), a narrator, children's choir and choir, organ and orchestra, taking aspects of structure and scoring from Bach's St John Passion. Kagel commented: "No one believes in God any more, but everyone believes in Bach". The music contains no quotations or parodies of Bach's music. Compared to Bach's Passion, reflection in arias and chorales is less extended. A reviewer compared the work's seriousness to late works by Hanns Eisler and to Hindemith's Mathis der Maler, and summarized "This is a respectful, even reverent, tribute from one composer to a great predecessor".

The work was premiered, conducted by the composer, as part of the Berliner Festwochen at the Berlin Philharmonie in November 1985, by soloists Anne Sofie von Otter, Hans Peter Blochwitz, Roland Hermann, narrator Peter Roggisch, organist Gerd Zacher, the Limburger Domsingknaben, the NDR Chor and Südfunk-Chor Stuttgart, and the Radio Symphony Orchestra Stuttgart. It was recorded shortly afterwards with the same performers.

== Structure ==
The text combines contemporary texts, including chorales, which are sometimes slightly changed, to mean Bach instead of Jesus:

1. Vivace – O a (Chorus, Baritone)
2. Chorale: Für deinen Thron tret' ich hiemit (Chorus, Mezzo-soprano, Baritone)
3. Moderato ma rubato, accompagnando – Johann Sebastian Bach, gehöret zu einem (Tenor)
4. Chorale: Ach wie flüchtig, ach wie nichtig! (Chorus) – Kehren wir zur unserm Johann Sebastian zurück (Tenor)
5. Chorale: Das neugeborne Kindelein (Chorus, Mezzo-soprano)
6. Andantino – Zwingt die Saiten in Cythara (Mezzo-soprano, Children's Chorus, Baritone)
7. Chorale: Er lasse uns sein Antlitz leuchten (Chorus, Children's Chorus)
8. Andante – Johann Sebastian Bach war noch nicht zehen (Tenor, Children's Chorus)
9. Chorale: Bach, der uns selig macht (Chorus, Baritone)
10. Andantino – Nachdem sein Bruder gestorben war (Tenor, Children's Chorus)
11. Chorale: Den Vater dort oben (Chorus)
12. Larghetto, ma poco rubato – Johann, rucke deine Kahle (Mezzo-soprano, Baritone)
13. Andantino – Von Lüneburg aus reisete er zuweilen (Tenor)
14. Andantino, un poco rubato – Im Jare 1703 kam er nach Weymar, und wurde daselbst Hofmusikus (Tenor)
15. Chorale: In allen meinem Taten (Speaker, Chorus)
16. Moderato – Urlaubsüberschreitung bei der Reise nach Lübeck (Tenor, Speaker, Baritone, Chorus)
17. Andantino – Den 17. Oktober 1707, ist der Ehrenwerte Herr Johann Sebastian Bach (Mezzo-soprano, Chorus)
18. Andantino, un poco rubato – Mühlhausen konnte das Vergnügen nicht haben (Tenor)
19. Chorale: Herzliebster Johann, was hast du verbrochen (Chorus, Mezzo-soprano, Tenor, Baritone, Children's Chorus)
20. Andantino: Magnifice, Hoch und Wohledle (Speaker, Chorus)
21. Chorale: Ein feste Burg ist unser Bach (Chorus) – Das 1717. Jahr grab dem bereits beruhmten Bach eien neue Gelegenheit (Tenor)
22. Chorale: Der du bist drei in Einigkeit (Chorus, Tenor, Speaker)
23. Chorale: O Mensch, bewein dein Sünde groß (Chorus, Mezzo-soprano, Baritone)
24. Colla parte: Andante – Staatsarchiv Weimar, Dokument 8995, folio 78 verso (Tenor, Baritone)
25. Chorale: O Traurigkeit, o Herzeleid (Chorus, Mezzo-soprano)
26. Allegretto – Siebzehnhundertacht, Wilhelm Friedermann (Mezzo-soprano, Speaker)
27. Chorale: Das walt' unser Vater Bach (Chorus, Children's Chorus)
28. Vivace – Die Stadt Leipzig erwählte Bach im Jahre 1723 (Tenor, Speaker, Chorus, Baritone)
29. Chorale: Erhalt uns, Herr, bei deinem Wort (Chorus, Mezzo-soprano, Tenor, Baritone)
30. Allegretto – Der Dienst in Leipzig ist bey weitem (Speaker) – Chorale: Du, o schönes Weltgebäude (Chorus, Children's Chorus, Speaker)
31. Andantino – Um Jahre 1747 that er eine Reise nach Berlin (Tenor)
32. Chorale: Die Nacht ist kommen (Chorus, Tenor, Mezzo-soprano, Baritone, Speaker)
33. Chorale: O Haupt voll Blut und Wunden (Chorus, Mezzo-soprano, Baritone)

== Evaluation ==
In 2002, Paul Griffiths compared recordings of four Passions modeled after Bach's works, commissioned for another Bach-Year in 2000 by the Internationale Bachakademie Stuttgart: Osvaldo Golijov's Pasión Según San Marcos, Sofia Gubaidulina's St. John Passion, Wolfgang Rihm's Deus Passus, and Tan Dun's Water Passion After St. Matthew. He called Kagel's work "the most intelligent attempt hitherto at a new Passion – and, indeed, the most moving", because Kagel "changed the game by making Bach himself the suffering protagonist."
