= Midori Suzuki (soprano) =

Japanese singer

- 鈴木 美登里
- Born: Kobe, Japan
- Occupation: Classical soprano
- Organizations: La Fonteverde
- Website: https://www.lafonteverde.com/

Midori Suzuki (Japanese: 鈴木 美登里, Hepburn: Suzuki Midori) is a Japanese classical soprano, specializing in Baroque music. She has recorded many cantatas by Johann Sebastian Bach with the Bach Collegium Japan, both as a soloist and as a member of the ensemble.

== Career ==
Born in Kobe, Suzuki studied at the Kyoto City University of Arts. After her graduation, she studied Baroque singing from 1991 at the Academy for Early Music in Amsterdam with Max van Egmond.

Suzuki has performed as a member of the Bach Collegium Japan. She appeared as a soloist in several volumes of the recording of all cantatas by Johann Sebastian Bach, conducted by her brother-in-law Masaaki Suzuki. A review of volume 5 said about the final duet of Tritt auf die Glaubensbahn, BWV 152, in which she sang the part of the Soul alongside Peter Kooy as Jesus: "both singers rise to the occasion, delivering characterization that couldn’t be rendered with more humility". A review of her recording of Was soll ich aus dir machen, Ephraim, BWV 89, notes: "She sings with great clarity. Her brief aria contains one of Bach’s typical, irresistible oboe obbligati. Suzuki matches the oboist’s delicacy and gives a lovely, poised account of the aria".

Suzuki was in 1996 the soprano soloist in Handel's Messiah with the Bach Collegium Japan, performing alongside Yoshikazu Mera, John Elwes and David Thomas. She also recorded Bach's St John Passion with the Bach Collegium Japan. In 2000 she was one of the singers who also formed the choir (OVPP, one voice per part) in a recording of Bach's Mass in B minor with the ensemble La Petite Bande, conducted by Sigiswald Kuijken. In 2015 she was the vocalist in a recording La Ciaccona, a collection of early ciacconas from Spain and Italy by composers including Andrea Falconieri, Girolamo Frescobaldi and Salomone Rossi, played by the Japanese Ensemble Anthonello.
