= Wo soll ich fliehen hin, BWV 5 =

Chorale cantata by Johann Sebastian Bach

Wo soll ich fliehen hin
- BWV 5
- Chorale cantata by J. S. Bach
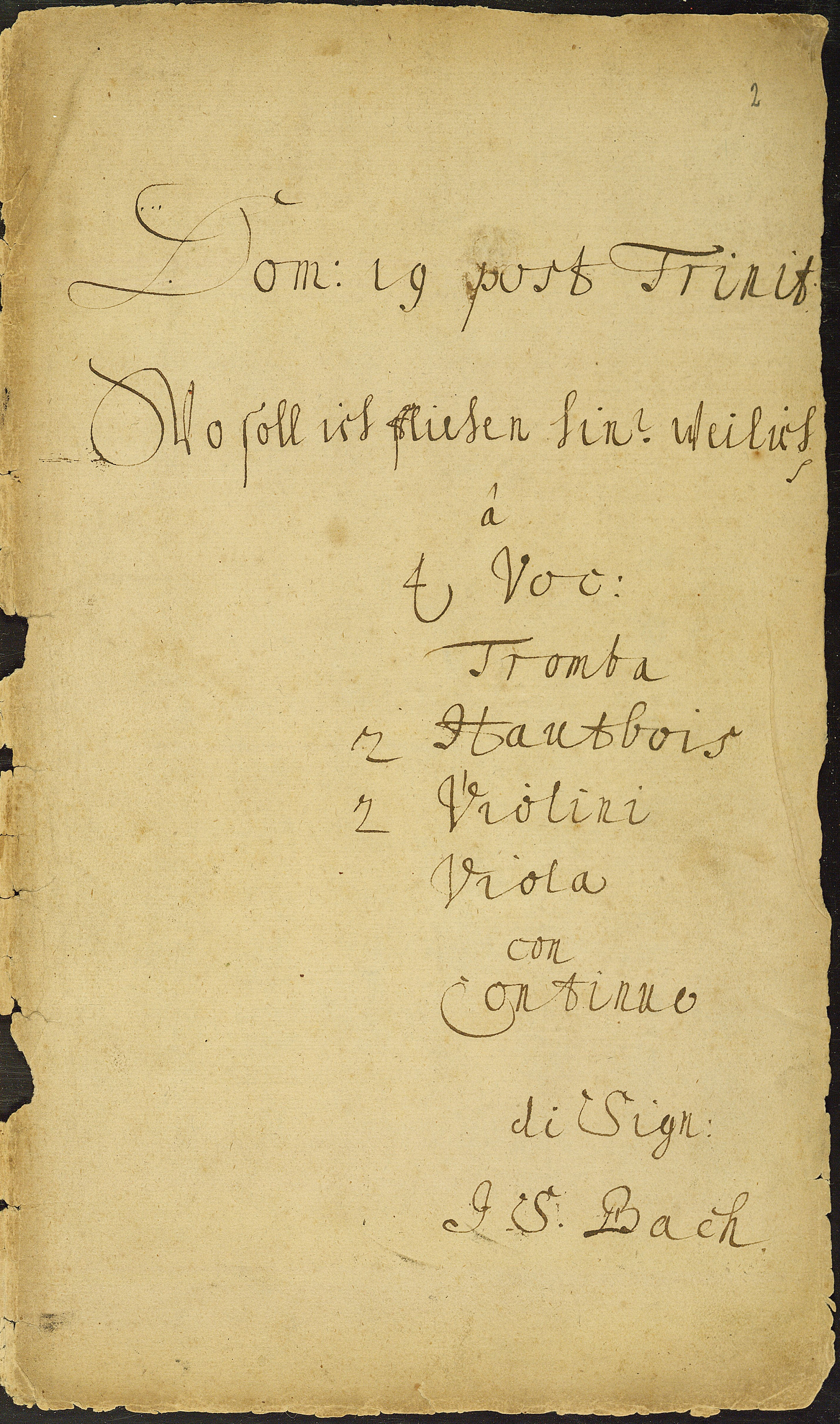
- Title page from Bach's autograph manuscript (now in the British Library's Zweig collection)
- Occasion: 19th Sunday after Trinity
- Chorale: Johann Heermann's "Wo soll ich fliehen hin"
- Performed: 15 October 1724: Leipzig
- Movements: 7
- Vocal: SATB choir and soloists
- Instrumental: tromba da tirarsi; 2 oboes; 2 violins; viola; continuo

Johann Sebastian Bach composed the church cantata (Bach) Wo soll ich fliehen hin (Where shall I flee), BWV 5, in Leipzig for the 19th Sunday after Trinity and first performed it on 15 October 1724. It is based on the penitential hymn "Wo soll ich fliehen hin" by Johann Heermann.

Wo soll ich fliehen hin belongs to Bach's chorale cantata cycle, the second cycle during his tenure as Thomaskantor that began in 1723. The text retains the first and 11th stanzas of the chorale unchanged, while the other stanzas were paraphrased into alternating recitatives and arias by an unknown librettist.

The cantata in seven movements is scored for SATB soloists and choir, and a Baroque instrumental ensemble of tromba da tirarsi (slide trumpet), two oboes, strings and continuo.

== History and words ==
Bach wrote the cantata in his second year in Leipzig for the 19th Sunday after Trinity. It is part of his chorale cantata cycle. The prescribed readings for the Sunday were from Paul's Epistle to the Ephesians – "put on the new man, which after God is created" (Ephesians 4:22–28) – and from the Gospel of Matthew, Healing the paralytic at Capernaum (Matthew 9:1–8).

The cantata text is based on the penitential hymn in eleven stanzas "Wo soll ich fliehen hin" by Johann Heermann, published in 1630, which is recommended for the Sunday in the Dresdner Gesangbuch. The hymn tune is "Auf meinen lieben Gott". An unknown poet retained the first and last stanzas as the respective chorale cantata movements and paraphrased the other stanzas rather freely: 2 and 3 as the second movement, 4 as the third movement, 5 to 7 as the fourth movement, 8 as the fifth movement, and 9 and 10 as the sixth movement. A year earlier, Bach had composed Ich elender Mensch, wer wird mich erlösen, BWV 48, for the same occasion, focused on the promise of Jesus to the sick man: "Your sins are forgiven". Similarly, the awareness of being a sinner who needs healing is the theme of Heermann's chorale and this cantata. The paraphrasing poetry adds images to the chorale which the composer could use, for example in movement 3 the divine source of blood to cleanse the stains of sins, a Baroque phrase relying on Psalms 51:4, Revelation 1:5 and Revelation 7:14. In movement 5 the poet invented a ferocious, hellish army, which is silenced by the believer who shows the blood of Jesus.

Bach first performed the cantata on 15 October 1724. A new organ part, written by Bach, confirms a performance around ten years later. Further performances are likely but not proven.

== Music ==
=== Structure and scoring ===
Bach structured the cantata in seven movements. Both text and tune of the hymn are retained in the outer movements, a chorale fantasia and a four-part closing chorale. Bach scored the work for four vocal soloists (soprano (S), alto (A), tenor (T) and bass (B)), a four-part choir, and a Baroque instrumental ensemble of tromba da tirarsi (Tr, a slide trumpet), two oboes (Ob), two violin parts (Vl), one viola part (Va), and basso continuo.

In the following table of the movements, the scoring, keys and time signatures are taken from Alfred Dürr's standard work Die Kantaten von Johann Sebastian Bach. The continuo, which plays throughout, is not shown.

Movements of Wo soll ich fliehen hin
No.	Title	Text	Type	Vocal	Winds	Strings	Key	Time
1	"Wo soll ich fliehen hin"	Heermann	Chorus	SATB	2 Ob, Tr (with S)	2 Vl, Va	G minor	common time
2	"Der Sünden Wust hat mich nicht nur befleckt"	anon.	Recitative	B				common time
3	"Ergieße dich reichlich, du göttliche Quelle"	anon.	Aria	T		Va	E♭ major	3/4
4	"Mein treuer Heiland tröstet mich"	anon.	Recitative	A	Oboe			common time
5	"Verstumme, Höllenheer"	anon.	Aria	B	2 Ob, Tr	2 Vl, Va	B♭ major	common time
6	"Ich bin ja nur das kleinste Teil der Welt"	anon.	Recitative	S				common time
7	"Führ auch mein Herz und Sinn"	Hunold	Chorale	SATB	2 Ob, Tr (with S)	2 Vl (with S and A), Va (with T)	G minor	common time

=== Movements ===
Bach arranged the movements in symmetry around movement 4 as the turning point in the cantata between desolation and hope, a recitative, which receives added weight by the cantus firmus of the chorale played by the oboe.

==== 1 ====
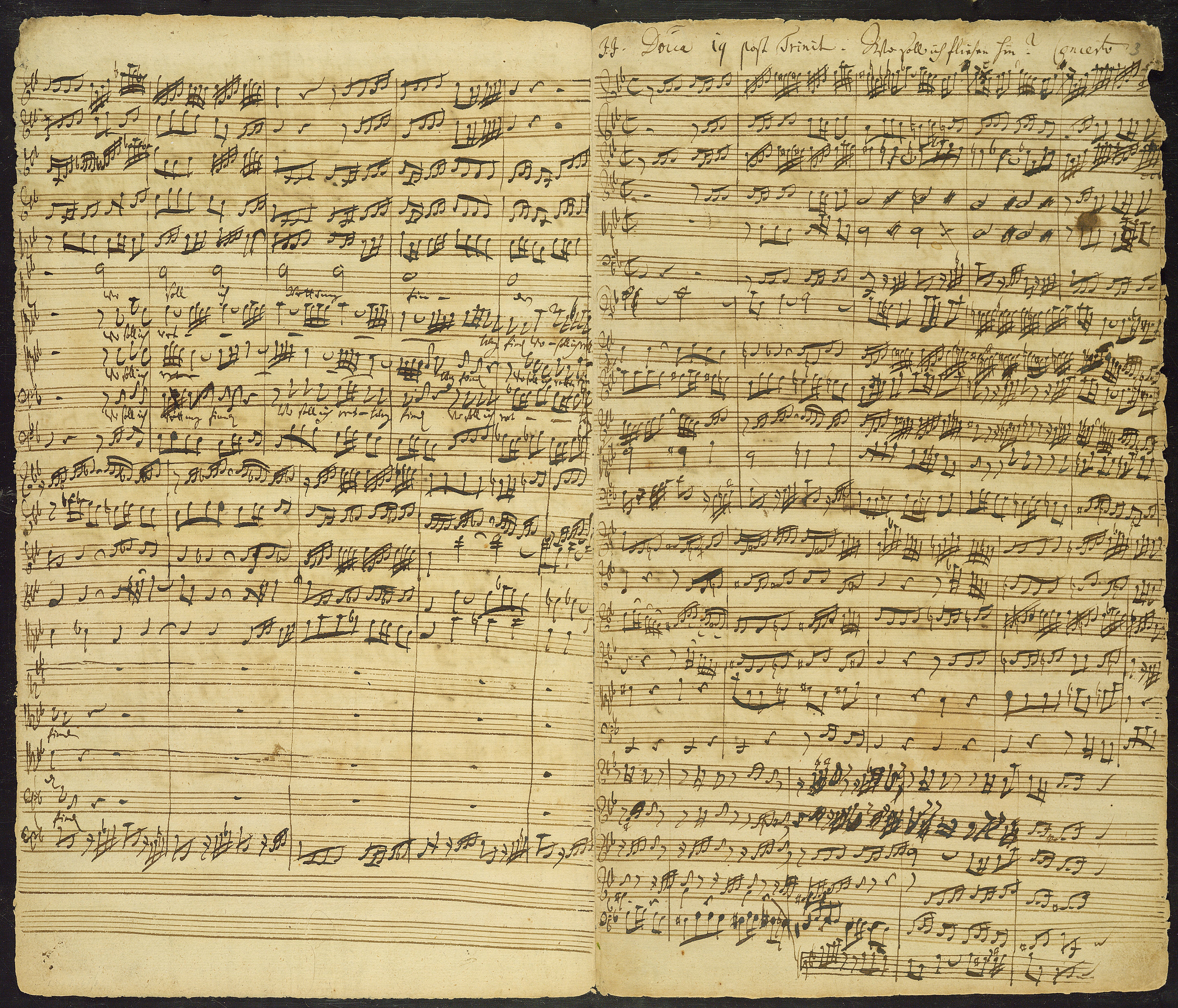
Opening of the first movement, from Bach's autograph manuscript (Zweig collection)

In the opening chorus, "Wo soll ich fliehen hin" (Where shall I flee), Bach gave the tune in unadorned long notes to the soprano, reinforced by the trumpet. The vocal parts are embedded in an independent instrumental concerto. The motifs of the instruments, which also appear in the lower voices, are derived from the tune, following the upward movement of its first line and the downward movement of its second line.

==== 2 ====
The first recitative, "Der Sünden Wust hat mich nicht nur befleckt, er hat vielmehr den ganzen Geist bedeckt" (This heap of sins has not merely left a stain, it has done much more; covered my entire spirit), is a secco sung by the bass.

==== 3 ====
In the first aria, "Ergieße dich reichlich, du göttliche Quelle, ach, walle mit blutigen Strömen auf mich" (Pour yourself richly, you divine fountain, ah, wash over me with bloody streams), the tenor voice is accompanied only by an obbligato instrument. In the original part, it is named as a violin but the notation in tenor clef points at a violoncello piccolo. Some editions, such as Carus-Verlag, suggest a viola. The instrument illustrates the flow of blood, termed by John Eliot Gardiner the "gushing, curative effect of the divine spring" in "tumbling liquid gestures", and summarised as "the cleansing motions of some prototype baroque washing machine". The tenor sings the same figuration on the word "wäschet" (washing). Bach used the solo viola only rarely in his cantatas (twice, according to Boyd); he may have played these solos himself.

==== 4 ====
The second recitative, "Mein treuer Heiland tröstet mich, es sei verscharrt in seinem Grabe, was ich gesündigt habe;" (My loving Savior comforts me, buried in his grave are the sins I committed), is the centre-piece of the cantata. The oboe plays the chorale tune to the alto's singing. One line of the chorale stanza is sung unchanged: "was ich gesündigt habe" (the sins I committed).

==== 5 ====
In the second aria, "Verstumme, Höllenheer, du machst mich nicht verzagt" (Be silent, host of hell, you shall not make me despair), the bass voice is accompanied by the full orchestra with the trumpet as a "ferociously demanding obbligato", as John Eliot Gardiner described it. In sudden breaks it conveys the silencing of the host of hell. Different as the two arias are, the figuration in the second one is similar to the one in the first, interpreting that it is the very flow of blood which silences the "army of hell".

==== 6 ====
The last recitative, "Ich bin ja nur das kleinste Teil der Welt" (I am indeed, only the smallest part of the world), sung by the soprano, is another secco.

==== 7 ====
The closing chorale, "Führ auch mein Herz und Sinn" (Guide also my heart and mind), is set for four parts.

== Manuscripts and publication ==
A set of parts for the cantata is preserved, which was partly copied by Bach himself. The autograph score, now in the Stefan Zweig Collection of the British Library, was once owned by Joseph Joachim.

The cantata was first published in 1851 in the first complete edition of Bach's work, the Bach-Gesellschaft Ausgabe. The volume in question was edited by Moritz Hauptmann. In the Neue Bach-Ausgabe it was published in 1990, edited by Matthias Wendt.

== Recordings ==
A list of recordings is provided on the Bach Cantatas Website. Ensembles playing period instruments in historically informed performances are shown with a green background.

Recordings of Wo soll ich fliehen hin
Title	Conductor / Choir / Orchestra	Soloists	Label	Year	Orch. type
J. S. Bach: Das Kantatenwerk • Complete Cantatas • Les Cantates, Folge / Vol. 1	Nikolaus Harnoncourt: Wiener Sängerknaben; Chorus Viennensis; Concentus Musicus Wien	soloist of the Wiener Sängerknaben; Paul Esswood; Kurt Equiluz; Max van Egmond	Teldec	1972	Period
Bach Cantatas Vol. 5 – Sundays after Trinity II	Karl Richter Münchener Bach-Chor Münchener Bach-Orchester	Edith Mathis; Trudeliese Schmidt; Peter Schreier; Dietrich Fischer-Dieskau	Archiv Produktion	1978	
Die Bach Kantate Vol. 54	Helmuth Rilling Gächinger Kantorei Württembergisches Kammerorchester Heilbronn	Arleen Augér; Carolyn Watkinson; Aldo Baldin; Wolfgang Schöne	Hänssler	1979	
J. S. Bach: Complete Cantatas Vol. 11	Ton Koopman Amsterdam Baroque Orchestra & Choir	Sibylla Rubens; Annette Markert; Christoph Prégardien; Klaus Mertens	Antoine Marchand	1999	Period
Bach Edition Vol. 20 – Cantatas Vol. 9	Pieter Jan Leusink Holland Boys Choir Netherlands Bach Collegium	Ruth Holton; Sytse Buwalda; Nico van der Meel; Bas Ramselaar	Brilliant Classics	2000	Period
Bach Cantatas Vol. 10: Potsdam / Wittenberg	John Eliot Gardiner Monteverdi Choir English Baroque Soloists	Joanne Lunn; William Towers; James Gilchrist; Peter Harvey	Soli Deo Gloria	2000	Period
J. S. Bach: Cantatas Vol. 27 – Cantatas from Leipzig 1724	Masaaki Suzuki Bach Collegium Japan	Susanne Rydén; Pascal Bertin; Gerd Türk; Peter Kooy	BIS	2003	Period
