= Auf meinen lieben Gott =

Lutheran hymn

- Lutheran hymn
- English: "In God, My Faithful God"
- Catalogue: Zahn 2162–2166
- Text: attributed to Sigismund Weingärtner
- Language: German
- Meter: 6.6.7.7.7.7
- Melody: by Jacob Regnart
- Composed: 1574
- Published: 1607 (text), 1609 (tune)

"Auf meinen lieben Gott" ("In God, My Faithful God", literally: In my dear God [I trust]) is a Lutheran hymn from the 17th century. Several hymns are sung to the same hymn tune, including "Wo soll ich fliehen hin", and it was set in compositions. The hymn was translated into English as "In God, My Faithful God". It is part of modern hymnals and songbooks.

== History ==
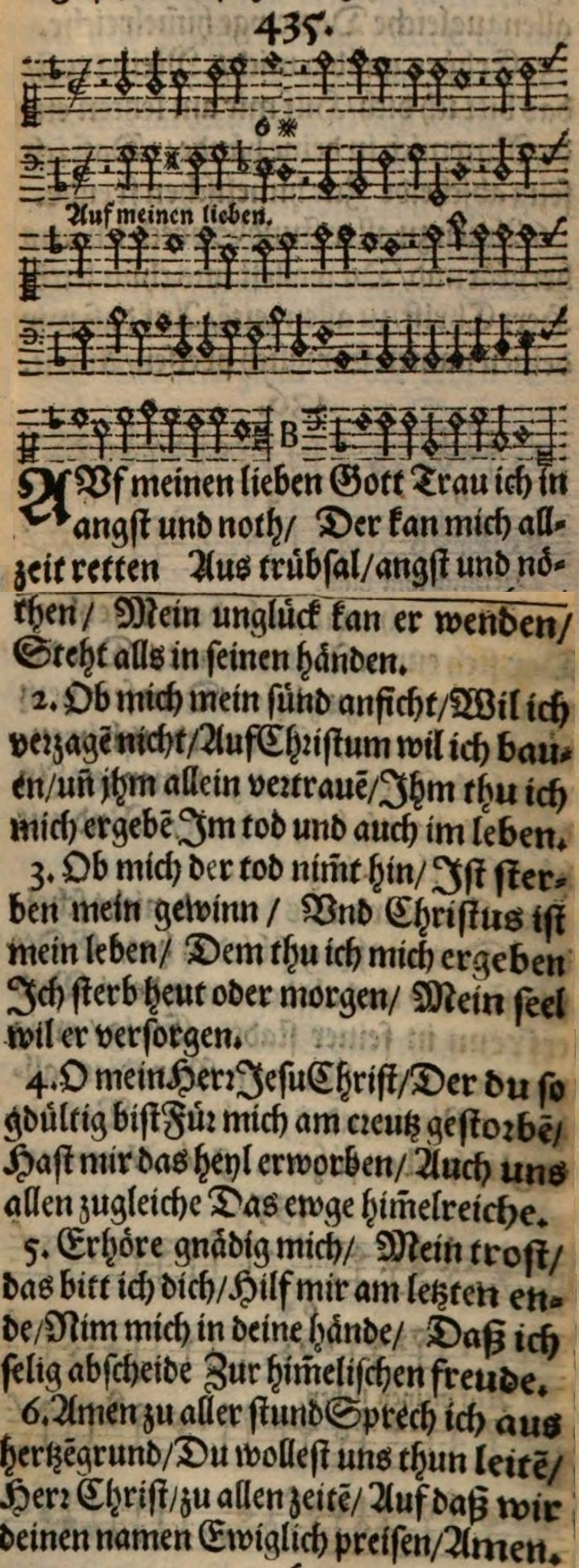
The hymn in Praxis pietatis melica, 1653, with a bass line by Johann Crüger

In 1607, "Auf meinen lieben Gott" was printed in 766 Geistliche Psalmen in Nürnberg. The publication does not name a text author for the hymn. In a 1611 hymnal, the hymn "Auf Jesum Christ steht all mein Thun" appears as a text written by Sigismund Weingärtner, an author about whom little is known. For the next hymn, "Auf meinen lieben Gott", no author name is given: it has been assumed that Weingärtner wrote this text too. The beginning is "Auf meinen lieben Gott trau ich in Angst und Not", expressing trust in God even in anxiety and distress.

A modified version of Zahn No. 2160, the melody of "Venus du und dein Kind" (Venus, you and your child), a 1574 secular song by Jacob Regnart, appeared in 1609 with the "Auf meinen lieben Gott" text (Zahn No. 2162). Johann Hermann Schein published his variant of the tune, Zahn No. 2164, with the "Auf meinen lieben Gott" text in 1627: this version of the tune was later also used for several other hymns. "Wo soll ich fliehen hin" is one of the hymns sung to the Zahn 2164 tune. Other melodies for "Auf meinen lieben Gott", Zahn Nos. 2165 and 2166, were published in 1727 and 1731 respectively.

The hymn was included in the 1653 edition of Johann Crüger's Praxis pietatis melica, with a bass line by Crüger. Catherine Winkworth translated the hymn into English as "In God, My Faithful God". The song is part of the Protestant hymnal Evangelisches Gesangbuch as EG 345. It appears in regional sections of the Catholic hymnal Gotteslob, and in other hymnals and songbooks.

== Musical settings ==
Dieterich Buxtehude composed a chorale partita, Auf meinen lieben Gott, BuxWV 179. Amongst Buxtehude's chorales this keyboard setting was unusual for its time, as it was both a secular suite of dances as well as a sacred set of variations with a funerary theme. Johann Sebastian Bach closed his 1723 cantata Bringet dem Herrn Ehre seines Namens, BWV 148, with a four-part setting of the hymn tune. The Neue Bach-Ausgabe suggests the fifth stanza from "Auf meinen lieben Gott". Bach included a stanza from the hymn as the closing chorale of his cantata Ich habe meine Zuversicht, BWV 188, probably in 1728, in a movement without text.

Norwegian jazz pianist Tord Gustavesen recorded a piano-bass-drums trio recording on his 2024 album "Seeing" on the ECM Records label.
