= Chobienia, Lubin County =

Chobienia
- Village
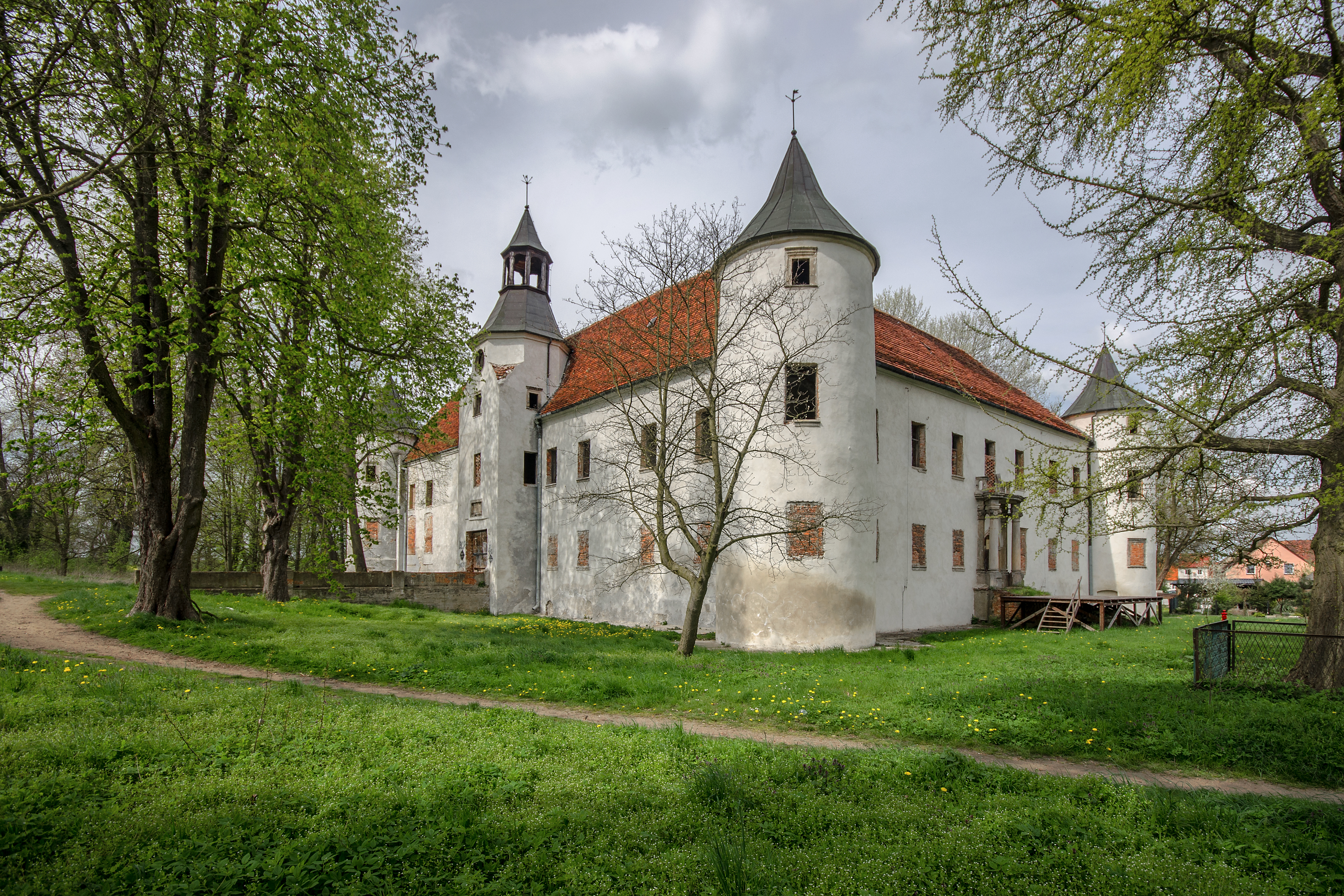
- Chobienia Castle, 2014

- Location within Poland
- Coordinates: 51°33′N 16°27′E
- Country: Poland
- Voivodeship: Lower Silesian
- County: Lubin
- Gmina: Rudna

Population
  - Total: 650
- Time zone: UTC+1 (CET)
  - Summer (DST): UTC+2 (CEST)
- Vehicle registration: DLU

Chobienia [xɔˈbjɛɲa] is a village (former town) in the administrative district of Gmina Rudna, within Lubin County, Lower Silesian Voivodeship, in south-western Poland.

Chobienia is the site of a Renaissance castle, where Frederick II of Prussia stayed after the Battle of Kunersdorf in 1759.

== Notable people ==
Johann Heermann (1585–1647), hymn composer, worked as a pastor in Köben from 1611.
