= Herzliebster Jesu =

Lutheran hymn written by Johann Heermann in 1630

- Lutheran Passion hymn
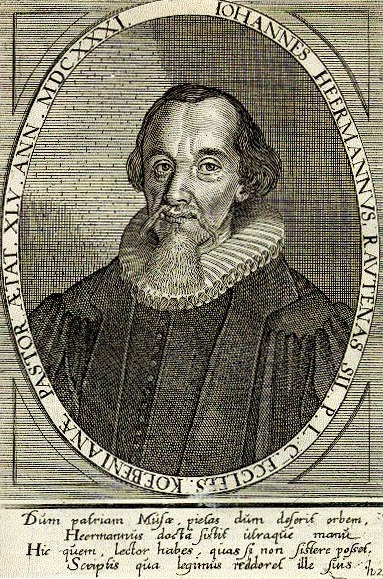
- Johann Heermann, the poet
- English: "O dearest Jesus"
- Catalogue: Zahn 983
- Genre: Hymn
- Written: 1630
- Text: by Johann Heermann
- Language: German
- Meter: 11.11.11.5
- Melody: by Johann Crüger
- Published: 1630

"Herzliebster Jesu" (often translated into English as "Ah, Holy Jesus", sometimes as "O Dearest Jesus") is a Lutheran Passion hymn in German, written in 1630 by Johann Heermann, in 15 stanzas of 4 lines, first published in Devoti Musica Cordis in Breslau. As the original headline reveals, it is based on Augustine of Hippo; this means the seventh chapter of the so-called "Meditationes Divi Augustini", presently ascribed to John of Fécamp.

== Melody and musical settings ==
The tune, Zahn No. 983, was written ten years later by Johann Crüger and first appeared in Crüger's Neues vollkömmliches Gesangbuch Augsburgischer Confession.

The tune has been used many times, including settings by J.S. Bach: one of the Neumeister Chorales for organ, BWV 1093, two movements of the St John Passion, and three of the St Matthew Passion. Johannes Brahms used it for one of his Eleven Chorale Preludes for organ, Op. 122: No. 2.). Max Reger's Passion, No. 4 from his organ pieces Sieben Stücke, Op. 145 (1915–1916), uses this melody. Mauricio Kagel quoted the hymn, paraphrased as "Herzliebster Johann, was hast du verbrochen", in his oratorio Sankt-Bach-Passion telling Bach's life, composed for the tricentenary of Bach's birth in 1985.

Christian Fürchtegott Gellert wrote his Passion hymn "Herr, stärke mich, dein Leiden zu bedenken" (Lord, strengthen me to reflect on your suffering) to the same melody, first published in 1757.

== Translations ==
The most common English translation of this hymn was written by Robert Bridges in 1897 and begins with the first line "Ah, holy Jesus, how hast thou offended?" However, several Lutheran hymnals use a translation written in 1863 by Catherine Winkworth which begins "O dearest Jesus, what law hast thou broken?" An alternative translation in modern English from the Choral Niagara website is also shown below for comparison.

Original German	Bridges translation
Herzliebster Jesu, was hast du verbrochen, Daß man ein solch scharf Urteil hat gesprochen? Was ist die Schuld? In was für Missetaten; Bist du geraten?	Ah, holy Jesus, how hast Thou offended, That man to judge Thee hath in hate pretended? By foes derided, by Thine own rejected, O most afflicted.
Winkworth translation	Choral Niagara translation
O dearest Jesus, what law hast Thou broken That such sharp sentence should on Thee be spoken? Of what great crime hast Thou to make confession, What dark transgression?	Beloved Jesus, what have you done wrong that they have pronounced so hard a sentence? What is your guilt, into what sort of misdeeds have you fallen?
