= Johann Heermann =

German poet hymn-writer (1585–1647)

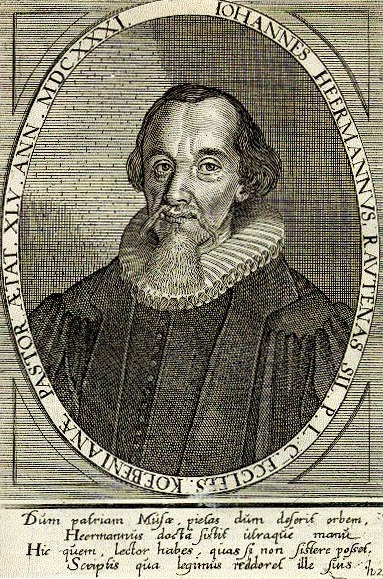
- Born: 11 October 1585; Rudna, Silesia
- Died: 17 February 1647 (aged 61); Leszno
- Occupations: Poet; Hymn writer; Pastor

Johann Heermann (11 October 1585 – 17 February 1647) was a German poet and hymnodist. He is commemorated in the Calendar of Saints of the Lutheran Church on 26 October with Philipp Nicolai and Paul Gerhardt.

== Life ==
Heermann was born in Raudten (modern day Rudna) in Silesia. He was the fourth son of a middle-class Protestant family. None of his elder siblings had survived beyond childhood, so when the infant Heermann became very ill, his mother prayed that, if he survived, she would pay for him to study at university. He attended the local school in Raudten, and when his teacher Johannes Baumann left the school to become the local pastor in 1597, Heermann's parents took him to Wohlau (Wołów), where he lived and studied with Jakob Fuchs, a doctor and apothecary. At school in Wohlau, he was taught by Georg Gigas, son of Johann Gigas, composer of two popular hymns of the time. After a year he became ill yet again, and his parents brought him home. After recovering, he returned to school in Raudten. At the house of a teacher, Gregorius Fiebing, he began his first poetry at the age of seventeen.

In 1602, he moved to Wschowa, Poland, where he lived and worked with the theologian Valerius Herberger, who employed him as amanuensis and tutor to his son Zacharias. Here, Heermann's skills as a poet were recognized and encouraged. Despite Herberger's influence, he stayed only a year in Wschowa, moving on to study at the Gymnasium Elisabethanum in Breslau (Wrocław), then to the Gymnasium in Brzeg in Autumn 1604, where he had the opportunity to give speeches and recite his poetry.

He decided to go to university in 1607, but was persuaded by his patron, Wenzel von Rothkirch, to stay with him, teaching his two sons and accompanying them on a trip around Europe. Heermann agreed, using his spare time to study in the ducal library and that of the university rector. He was also able to publish small collections of speeches and poems, and came in contact with Matthäus Zuber, a talented poet who had also been made poet laureate. Heermann, too, aspired to this, achieving laureation on 8 October 1608 in Brieg.

Over Easter 1609 he travelled via Leipzig and Jena to Strasbourg, where they matriculated at the university, attending theology lectures and meeting the professors of rhetoric and law. The following year, he contracted an eye infection after publishing a book of epigrams, and returned home on doctor's advice. He had a nightmare journey home, arriving even less healthy than when he left. Soon after his return, he was ordained and appointed deacon to the Lutheran congregation in Köben (modern-day Chobienia, Poland), where the incumbent pastor was old and in poor health. He began work on Ascension Day 1611, and a few days later the pastor died, with Heermann taking on his duties on a temporary basis, despite having only been there for a week. He was put in permanent charge that same autumn, and also married Dorothea Feige, the daughter of the mayor of Raudten.

After a successful start to his career in Köben, the plague arrived in 1613, then in 1616 a fire swept through the town. In addition, Heermann's wife Dorothea died childless on 13 September 1617. He married again in 1618, this time to Anna Teichmann, daughter of a merchant; they had four children: Samuel, Euphrosina, Johann and Ephraim.

Heermann fell ill once again in 1623 and never really recovered, his nose and air passages having become infected. The effects of the Thirty Years' War struck soon afterwards, and Köben was plundered by Catholic troops in 1632, 1633, 1634 and 1642, and Heermann lost his worldly possessions several times. In 1634, his illness prevented him from preaching altogether, and he no longer read out his sermons in church. On doctor's advice, he moved across the border to Poland, to Leszno, where he died on 17 February 1647.

== Works ==
Heermann started out writing Latin poetry, with his Flores ex Otfridi Evangeliorum vireto being published in 1609. The poems contained in this collection are Latin poems based on passages from the Gospels, yet for each Latin poem, one or two lines of German poetry were added, showing that Heermann had an early desire to write poetry in German too. Later works also belonged to the tradition of versifying passages from the Gospels, such as Andächtiger Kirchenseuftzer (1616), Exercitium pietatis (1630) - a revised version of Flores - Verbessertes Schliessglöcklein (1632) - a revised version of the Kirchenseuftzer - and Sontags- und Festevangelia (1636). Impetus for this process of revision came from Martin Opitz's Buch von der deutschen Poeterey (1624), which acted both as a defence of German poetry and a set of guidelines on how German poetry should be composed. Johann Heermann can be regarded as one of the first German poets to write according to the rules set out in Opitz's tract.

As well as poetry based on the Gospels, Heermann also wrote poetry influenced by works of devotional literature, especially those by Valerius Herberger, Martin Moller and Johann Arndt. These works were often themselves influenced by earlier, pre-Reformation texts by the Church Fathers, especially Bernard of Clairvaux, Augustine and Anselm of Canterbury. Heermann's most influential work of devotional poetry was Devoti musica cordis (1630). This 'music for a devout heart' combined hymns based on texts of the Church Fathers and writers such as Moller with hymns Heermann himself had composed. In addition to works of poetry, he also published collections of sermons.

Hymns from Devoti musica cordis

- "Was willst du dich betrüben" (Why do you want to distress yourself)
- "O Jesu Christe, wahres Licht" (O Christ, our true and only light)
- "Herzliebster Jesu, was hast du verbrochen" (Beloved Jesus, what have you done wrong)
- "O Gott, du frommer Gott" (O God, Thou faithful God)
- "Herr, unser Gott, lass nicht zuschanden werden" (O Lord, our Father, shall we be confounded)
- "Jesu, deine tiefen Wunden" (Jesus, Grant that Balm and Healing)

Johann Sebastian Bach based his chorale cantata Wo soll ich fliehen hin, BWV 5 on Heermann's hymn with the same name.

== Sources ==
- Carl Hitzeroth, Johann Heermann (1585–1647): Ein Beitrag der Geschichte der geistlichen Lyrik im siebzehnten Jahrhundert, Marburg: Elwert, 1907
- Rudolf Irmler, Johann Heermann. Der schlesische Hiob, Giessen: Brunnen-Verlag, 1959
- Bernhard Liess, Johann Heermann (1585–1647): Prediger in Schlesien zur Zeit des Dreissigjährigen Krieges, Münster: Lit, 2003
- Alfred Wiesenhuetter, Johann Heermann (1585–1647), Leipzig: Schloessmann, 1935
- Carl-Alfred Zell, Untersuchungen zum Problem der geistlichen Barocklyrik mit besonderer Berücksichtigung der Dichtung Johann Heermanns (1585–1647), Heidelberg: Carl Winter Universitätsverlag, 1971
- Catherine Winkworth, Christian Singers of Germany, 1869
- "Johann Heermann". The Canterbury Dictionary of Hymnology. Canterbury Press.
