= List of chorale harmonisations by Johann Sebastian Bach =

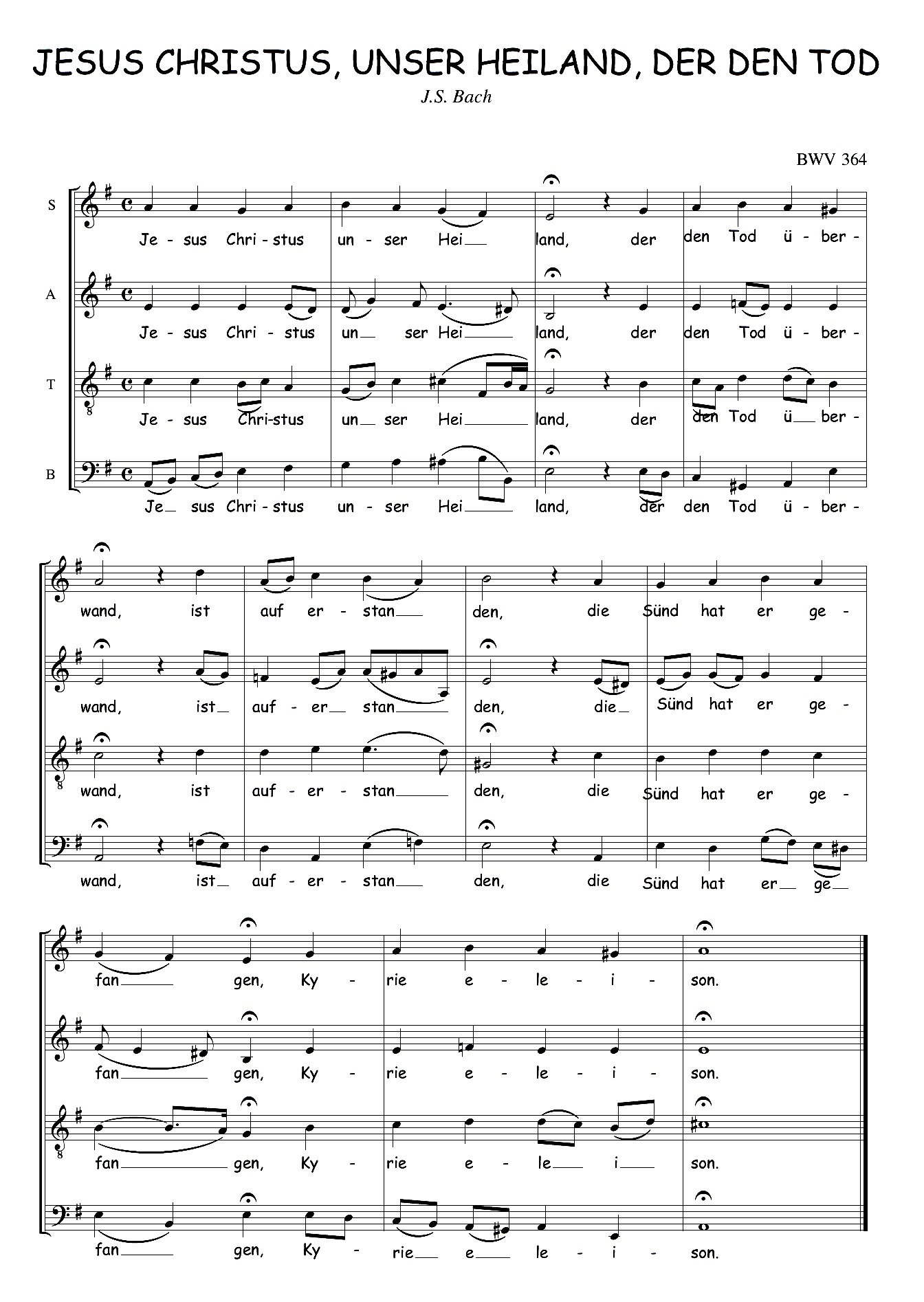
BWV 364, Johann Sebastian Bach's chorale harmonisation of the hymn Jesus Christus, unser Heiland, der den Tod überwand

Johann Sebastian Bach's chorale harmonisations, alternatively named four-part chorales, are Lutheran hymn settings that characteristically conform to the following:

- four-part harmony
- SATB vocal forces
- pre-existing hymn tune allotted to the soprano part
- text treatment:
  - homophonic
  - no repetitions (i.e., each syllable of the hymn text is sung one time)

Around 400 of such chorale settings by Bach, mostly composed in the first four decades of the 18th century, are extant:

- Around half of that number are chorales which were transmitted in the context of larger vocal works such as cantatas, motets, Passions and oratorios. A large part of these chorales are extant as autographs by the composer, and for nearly all of them a colla parte instrumental and/or continuo accompaniment are known.
- All other four-part chorales exclusively survived in collections of short works, which include manuscripts and 18th-century prints. Apart from the Three Wedding Chorales collection (BWV 250–252), these are copies by other scribes and prints only published after the composer's death, lacking context information, such as instrumental accompaniment, for the individual harmonisations.

Apart from homophonic choral settings, Bach's Lutheran hymn harmonisations also appear as:

- sung chorale fantasias in some of Bach's larger vocal works
- hymn melodies for which Bach composed or improved a thorough bass accompaniment, for instance as included in Georg Christian Schemelli's Musicalisches Gesang-Buch
- harmonisations included in purely instrumental compositions, most typically organ compositions such as chorale preludes or chorale partitas.

== History ==
The compositions by Johann Sebastian Bach that had been printed during his lifetime were nearly exclusively instrumental works. Moreover, by the time Bach died in 1750 it was forgotten that a few of his vocal works (BWV 71, BWV 439–507,...) had indeed been printed in the first half of the 18th century. In the period between the publication of The Art of Fugue in the early 1750s, and the publication of further works from 1800, only one group of Bach's works was published: his four-part chorales.

The most complete 18th century publication of chorales by J. S. Bach is Carl Philipp Emanuel Bach's edition in four volumes, published by Breitkopf from 1784 to 1787. About half of the chorale harmonisations in this collection have their origin in other extant works by Bach. This collection went through four more editions and countless reprintings until 1897. Several other collections of chorales by J. S. Bach were published, some of these using the original C-clefs or different texts.

The loss of musical material from Bach's death to the first printings of chorale collections may have been substantial. Not only are many works the chorales were extracted from no longer extant but there is no way of knowing how much of all the harmonisations that were once compiled the current collections include. For example, there is no way of knowing how many of the 150 harmonisations first proposed for sale in 1764 also appear in Princess Anna Amalia's manuscript which ultimately forms the basis of the Breitkopf edition. As to the chorale melodies with figured bass, current collections include less than one hundred of them whereas those proposed for sale in 1764 numbered 240.

The chorale harmonisations BWV 250–438 were probably all extracted from lost larger vocal works. For six of them the work they have been derived from has been identified. Bach's chorale harmonisations are all for a four-part choir (SATB), but Riemenschneider's and Terry's collections contain one 5-part SSATB choral harmonisation (Welt, ade! ich bin dein müde, Riemenscheider No. 150, Terry No. 365), not actually by Bach, but used by Bach as the concluding chorale to cantata Wer weiß, wie nahe mir mein Ende, BWV 27.

Some harmonisations exist in different keys, i.e. pitches, in 18th-century sources: for instance a Bach cantata autograph gives the four-part chorale in one key, and the same harmonisation is found in one or more of the early chorale compilations in a different key.

=== Manuscripts ===
The first record of the existence and sale of groups of collected chorale harmonisations and chorale melodies with figured bass extracted from larger works by J.S. Bach is from 1764, fourteen years after Bach's death. In that year the firm Breitkopf und Sohn announced for sale manuscript copies of 150 chorale harmonisations and 240 chorale melodies with figured bass by J.S. Bach.

In 1777 Johann Kirnberger started an active letter campaign to induce Breitkopf to publish a complete set of chorale harmonisations. Kirnberger's letters emphasize his motivation to have the chorales printed in order to preserve them for the benefit of future generations. The manuscript to be used once belonged to C. P. E. Bach, who sold it through Kirnberger to Princess Anna Amalia of Prussia (for twelve louis d'or). It is presumed that this manuscript contained neither the text of the chorales nor any reference to the larger works from which the harmonisations had been taken. The manuscript's harmonisations extracted only the vocal parts and ignored the instrumental parts and the continuo, even though all of Bach's chorale settings included both instrumental parts and continuo. The instrumental parts were either independent, so called obbligato instrumental parts, or mostly doubled the vocal parts sometimes separating from it for a very few beats, and the continuo had its bass mostly double the vocal bass at the lower octave, but could also separate from it for a very few beats. Finally in some cases, for reasons unknown, whoever extracted the chorale from the larger work, changed the key of the setting.

"Y" manuscript hypothesis
Hypothetical early autograph collection of chorale harmonisations from which Bach would have selected settings he later integrated into his larger vocal works.

Larger vocal works manuscripts
Mostly extant as autograph score and/or as parts written out under Bach's supervision: many of these works, such as cantatas and Passions, include four-part chorales

Three Wedding Chorales autograph
Bach's autograph of the wedding chorales BWV 250–252, written between 1734 and 1738.

Dietel manuscript, a.k.a. Dietel Collection and, in German, Choralsammlung Dietel
Earliest of the extant larger collection of chorale harmonisations manuscripts. It contains 149 chorale harmonisations (not 150 as is written on its title page) and originated around 1735. The music in the manuscript was copied by Johann Ludwig Dietel, one of Bach's pupils from the Thomasschule.

=== Printed editions ===
A few chorale harmonisations had been published before Bach adopted them into his larger vocal works, and are therefore listed as spurious in the third annex of the BWV catalogue:

- "Welt, ade! ich bin dein müde", BWV Anh. 170, also known as closing movement of cantata BWV 27: five-part harmonisation published, for instance, in Vopelius' 1682 Neu Leipziger Gesangbuch, p. 947.
- Cantata BWV 43, movement 11: harmonisation by Christoph Peter published in 1652, later adopted in Vopelius' Neu Leipziger Gesangbuch: "Ermuntre dich, mein schwacher Geist", p. 70.
- Cantata BWV 8, movement 6 (BWV 8/6): Daniel Vetter's four-part setting of "Liebster Gott, wann werd ich sterben", published in 1713.

Several more harmonisations stay close to the version published by Vopelius: for example "Christus, der ist mein Leben", BWV 281, is a variant of the harmonisation found in the Neu Leipziger Gesangbuch, with added embellishments and the harmonic structure altered for one of the tune's four phrases.

Printed collections of Bach's harmonisations usually provide an alphabetical collation of the chorales, that is, ranged alphabetically by text incipit of the hymn. Some editions contain an alphabetical index at the end of the compilation, for instance at the end of the final volume of C. P. E. Bach's 18th-century collection. Other editions, such as the Breitkopf compilations of 1892 and 1899, present the chorales themselves in alphabetical order. However, not all of these alphabetical collations result in analogous chorale sequences. Some major differences in this respect result from chorales that are known by different names: in that case it depends on the editor which name is used for the collation. For example, the melody of "Ach, lieben Christen, seid getrost" also being known as "Wo Gott der Herr nicht bei uns hält" it is an editor's discretion whether BWV 256 is found early on or near the end of an alphabetically sorted collection.

==== 18th century ====
Some of Bach's voice and thoroughbass settings published in Georg Christian Schemelli's 1736 Musicalisches Gesang-Buch are better known in their four-part realisation included in the chorale harmonisation collections.

Chorales published by Birnstiel (200)
In 1765 F. W. Birnstiel published 100 chorales in Berlin. The edition had been initiated by F. W. Marpurg and completed, edited and supplemented with a preface and a list of errata by C. P. E. Bach. A second volume of 100 was issued by the same publisher in 1769, edited by J. F. Agricola. C. P. E. Bach criticised this publication as being full of mistakes in an article which was published in Hamburg in the Staats- und Gelehrte Zeitung des Hamburgischen unpartheyeschen Correspondenten on 30 May 1769, in which he also claimed that some of the chorale harmonisations included in the volume had not been composed by his father.

C. P. E. Bach's edition for Breitkopf (371)
After Kirnberger died in 1783, C. P. E. Bach became Breitkopf's editor for the chorales, which he then published in four parts:
- Vol. I (1784): Nos. 1–96
- Vol. II (1785): Nos. 97–194
- Vol. III (1786): Nos. 195–283
- Vol. IV (1787): Nos. 283–370
Since the number 283 was used twice (last number of Vol. III and first number of Vol. IV), the collection actually contained 371 items. The collection also contained several doubles (e.g. No. 156 is identical to No. 307): it totalled 348 independent harmonisations.

==== 19th century ====
C. P. E. Bach's selection of 371 chorale harmonisations was republished a few times in the 19th century, for instance by Carl Ferdinand Becker in 1832 (third edition), and by Alfred Dörffel in 1870.

Bach Gesellschaft (larger vocal works + 3 + 185)
The Bach-Gesellschaft Ausgabe (BGA, Bach Gesellschaft edition) kept the chorale settings that were part of a larger vocal work (cantata, motet, Passion or oratorio) together with these larger vocal works and added the Three Wedding Chorales to its 13th volume containing wedding cantatas. The remaining separate four-part chorales, purged from doubles, were ordered alphabetically and numbered from 1 to 185 in the 39th volume which was published in 1892.

Richter's edition for Breitkopf (389)
In the late 19th century Bernhard Friedrich Richter collected all straightforward chorale harmonisations that had appeared in the BGA edition —including as well the separate ones as those from larger vocal works—, added a "Herr Gott, dich loben alle wir" harmonisation from a variant version of Cantata 130, and numbered all of these chorales in alphabetical order. The set contained a few doubtful and spurious settings (e.g. from Telemann cantatas which at the time were still attributed to Bach), but four-part settings which were part of a more complex texture (e.g. the fifth movement of Cantata 22 where the vocal homophony is supplemented by instrumental figuration) were not always included by Richter. The set was published by Breitkopf as Joh. Seb. Bach: 389 Choral-Gesänge für gemischten Chor in 1899.

==== 20th century ====
The Bach-Werke-Verzeichnis, published in 1950, did not assign a separate BWV number to harmonisations contained in extant larger vocal works such as cantatas and Passions. The Three Wedding Chorales were assigned the numbers 250 to 252, and the 185 (+1: see below) four-part chorales contained in Vol. 39 of the BGA edition were given, in the same order, the numbers 253 to 438.

Terry (405)
Published in 1929, Charles Sanford Terry's J. S. Bach's Four-Part Chorales contains 405 chorale harmonisations and 95 melodies with figured bass. The collection was reprinted 1964, with a foreword by Walter Emery.

Riemenschneider (371)
Albert Riemenschneider's collection of 371 chorales was published in 1941. It contained the same 371 settings as the C. P. E. Bach edition for Breitkopf, but with a few differences in the collation. In some cases Riemenschneider restored some information about obbligato instrumental parts based on extant larger works, e.g. his No. 270 from cantata BWV 161, or about the continuo bass line if this does not exactly coincide with the vocal bass, e.g. his No. 29 from cantata BWV 32 and his No. 35 from the Christmas Oratorio. Riemenschneider did however not restore original keys to the extant larger works, but instead kept the chorales in the keys as they had been published in the Breitkopf collection, e.g. his No. 22, in E-flat major, comes from cantata BWV 180 where it is in F major. At times the key signature in Riemenschneider's edition does not correspond to the key, for instance No. 19, in G minor but written with a "Dorian" G key signature. This too is presumably reproduced from the Breitkopf edition, which would have followed a common 17th- and 18th-century practice.

Editio Musica Budapest (388)
Editio Musica Budapest (EMB) published Imre Sulyok's edition of 388 chorale harmonisations in 1982. With a few differences (e.g. a de-doubling of the near-identical BWV 253 and 414, and some differences in the collation) the collection is largely comparable to the Richter edition.

Kalmus (389)
Kalmus republished the 389 chorales of Richter's collection.

NBA
The New Bach Edition published the Three Wedding Chorales and the four-part chorales contained in the Dietel collection in 1991 (Series III, Vol. 2/1). The chorales from C. P. E. Bach's collection were published in 1996 (Series III, Vol. 2/2). Vol. 3 of the same series, published in 2002, contains a few chorales of doubtful authenticity found in other manuscripts and early editions. Vol. 9 of the second series, published in 2000, contains a few doubtful chorales found in various Passions. Better known chorale harmonisations are also contained in other volumes of series I (cantatas), II (Passions and oratorios) and V (e.g. BWV 299 as contained in the Notebook for Anna Magdalena Bach).

==== 21st century ====
Czarnecki (413)
Christopher Czarnecki (editor). J.S. Bach 413 Chorales. SeeZar Publications, 2014. ISBN 0989087913

Dahn (420)
Luke Dahn (editor). J.S. Bach Chorales: a new critical and complete edition arranged by BWV catalogue number with text and historical contextual information included for each chorale with numerous indices included in the appendix. LuxSitPress, 2017.

== Chorale harmonisations in various collections ==
Most of Bach's known chorale harmonisations are movements in his extant cantatas, motets, Passions and oratorios. These are compositions which have a BWV number ranging from 1 to 249. BWV 250 to 438 is the range of the separate four-part chorales. Chorale harmonisations with a number above 438 are mostly later additions to the BWV catalogue. The 5th chapter of the 1998 edition of the Bach-Werke-Verzeichnis (BWV^{2a}) contains the chorales BWV 250–438, and some later additions (BWV 500a, 1084, 1089 and 1122–1126).

=== Numbering conventions ===
All BWV numbers used in the listings below are according to the latest version of the Bach-Werke-Verzeichnis and further updates of these numbers found at the Bach Digital website. When a BWV number is followed by a slash ("/"), the number or letter after that slash indicates the movement in the composition.

Settings from Schemellis Gesangbuch are indicated by their BWV number (BWV 439–507), by the number of the hymn in the original publication (Nos. 1–954), and, between brackets, the number of the setting in Vol. 39 of the BGA edition (1–69).

A cross-reference between Lutheran hymns, their Zahn number, and their appearance in compositions by Bach (including, but not limited to, the chorale harmonisations) can be found pp. 471–481 of BWV^{2a}.

Legend to the table
| column | | content |
|---|---|---|
| 1 | Chorale text | Text incipit of the harmonised hymn. Information regarding which part of the hymn Bach used is given in parentheses, typically verse numbers indicated by "v." Hymn titles without such information as in (untexted) chorale harmonisation collections. |
| 2 | Zahn | Zahn number of the chorale melody. When the data in the Zahn column starts with N that refers to "Nachtrag von vier Melodien" (supplement of four melodies), pp. 566–568 in Zahn's 1893 last volume: the number after the slash refers to the place of the melody in this sequence of four. |
| 3 | BWV | Sorted by BWV number, the table has these subdivisions: BWV 1–197a: from church cantatas, Ascension Oratorio; BWV 226–229: from motets; BWV 244–244b: from St Matthew Passion; BWV 245: from St John Passion; BWV 248: from Christmas Oratorio; BWV 250–252: **Three Wedding Chorales**; BWV 253–438: **186 four-part chorales in BGA Vol. 39**; BWV 441^{*}–deest: Other chorale harmonisations |
| 4 | 389 | Number of the chorale setting in Richter's 19th-century compilation of chorale harmonisations. These are also known as Kalmus numbers while that publisher reissued Richter's compilation of 389 chorales. Richter/Kalmus Nos. 130, 219 and 387 are not included in the table: see "In church cantatas" section below. |
| 5 | CPE | Numbers as in C. P. E. Bach's 18th-century publication of his father's chorales. The two No. 283 chorales are distinguished as "283" for the one included in Vol. III, and "283bis" for the one included in Vol. IV. |
| 6 | Rie. | Numbers as in Riemenschneider's 1941 publication of the chorales. |
| 7 | Notes | External links in this column go to chorale pages at Luke Dahn's bach-chorales.com website. |
| 8 | BC F | Bach Compendium (BC) series F; external links in this column go to the Bach Digital Work page about the chorale |

Bach's chorale harmonisations
| Chorale text | Zahn | BWV | 389 | CPE | Rie. | Notes | BC F |
|---|---|---|---|---|---|---|---|
| From church cantatas, Ascension Oratorio | (Zahn) | **1–197a** | (389) | (CPE) | (Rie.) | (↑ Go to top of table ↑) | (BC F) |
| Wie schön leuchtet der Morgenstern (v. 7) | 8359 | 1/6 | 378 | | | 0001_6 | — |
| Ach Gott, vom Himmel sieh darein (v. 6) | 4431 | 2/6 | 7 | 262 | 262 | 0002_6 | 3.2a/b |
| Ach Gott, wie manches Herzeleid (v. 18) | 553a | 3/6 | 8 | 156 | 156 | 0003_6 | 87.2a/b |
| Ach Gott, wie manches Herzeleid (v. 18) | 553a | 3/6 | 8 | 307 | 308 | 0003_6 | 87.2a/b |
| Christ lag in Todesbanden (v. 7) | 7012a | 4/8 | 41 | 184 | 184 | 0004_8 | 26.3b |
| Wo soll ich fliehen hin (v. 11) | 2164 | 5/7 | 28 | 303 | 304 | 0005_7 | 20.2b |
| Erhalt uns, Herr, bei deinem Wort (v. 2) | 350 | 6/6 | 79 | 72 | 72 | 0006_6 | 56.1a/b |
| Christ unser Herr zum Jordan kam (v. 7) | 7246 | 7/7 | 44 | | | 0007_7 | — |
| Liebster Gott, wenn werd ich sterben (v. 5) | 6634 | 8/6 | 227 | 43 | 43 | 0008_6; Spurious | 131.1a/b |
| Liebster Gott, wenn werd ich sterben | 6634 | 8/6* | | | | ≈BWV 8/6; ≈BWV 483 | 131.1c |
| Es ist das Heil uns kommen her (vv. 7–8) | 4430 | 9/7 | 87 | 289 | 290 | 0009_7 | 59.2a/b |
| Meine Seele erhebt den Herren (doxology) | 7372~ | 10/7 | 122 | 357 | 358 | 0010_7; Tune: German Magnificat (metric) | 140.3a/b |
| Du Lebensfürst, Herr Jesu Christ (v. 4) | 5741 | 11/6 | 82 | 342 | 343 | 0011_6; (BWV 11 = Ascension Oratorio) | 57.3 |
| Was Gott tut, das ist wohlgetan (v. 6) | 5629 | 12/7 | 340 | | | 0012_7; ≈BWV 69a/6 | — |
| In allen meinen Taten (v. 15) | 2293b | 13/6 | 295 | 103 | 103 | 0013_6 | 166.3; — |
| Wär Gott nicht mit uns diese Zeit (v. 3) | 4434 | 14/5 | 330 | 182 | 182 | 0014_5 | 188.1a/b |
| Helft mir Gotts Güte preisen (v. 5) | 5267 | 16/6 | 125 | 99 | 99 | 0016_6 | 80.2a/b |
| Nun lob, mein Seel, den Herren (v. 3) | 8244 | 17/7 | 271 | 6 | 7 | 0017_7 | 153.3a/b |
| Durch Adams Fall ist ganz verderbt (v. 8) | 7549 | 18/5 | 73 | 100 | 100 | 0018_5 | 52.1b/c |
| Durch Adams Fall ist ganz verderbt (v. 8) | 7549 | 18/5 | 73 | 126 | 126 | 0018_5 | 52.1b/c |
| Freu dich sehr, o meine Seele (v. 9) | 6543 | 19/7 | 99 | 297 | 298 | 0019_7 | 208.7b |
| O Ewigkeit, du Donnerwort (vv. 11, 16) | 5820 | 20/7, /11 | 276 | 26 | 26 | 0020_7_11 | 156.2 |
| Herr Christ, der einge Gottessohn (v. 5) | 4297a | 22/5 | | | | 0022_5 | — |
| O Gott, du frommer Gott (v. 1) | 5148 | 24/6 | | 336 | 337 | 0024_6 | 157; — |
| Treuer Gott, ich muss dir klagen (v. 12) | 6543 | 25/6 | 101 | 254 | 254 | 0025_6 | 208.1b; — |
| Treuer Gott, ich muss dir klagen (v. 12) | 6543 | 25/6 | 101 | 282 | 282 | 0025_6 | 208.1b; — |
| Ach wie flüchtig, ach wie nichtig (v. 8) | 1887 | 26/6 | 11 | 48 | 48 | 0026_6 | 6.1 |
| Helft mir Gotts Güte preisen (v. 6) | 5267 | 28/6 | 124 | 23 | 23 | 0028_6 | 80.1a/b; — |
| Helft mir Gotts Güte preisen (v. 6) | 5267 | 28/6 | 124 | 88 | 88 | 0028_6 | 80.1a/b; — |
| Nun lob, mein Seel, den Herren (v. 5) | 8244 | 29/8 | 272 | 116 | 116 | 0029_8 | 153.4b |
| Tröstet, tröstet meine Lieben (v. 3) | 6543 | 30/6 | 103 | 76 | 76 | 0030_6 | 208.6b |
| Wenn mein Stündlein vorhanden ist (v. 5) | 4482a,b | 31/9 | 357 | | | 0031_9 | 201.5 |
| Weg, mein Herz, mit den Gedanken (v. 12) | 6543 | 32/6 | 102 | 29 | 29 | 0032_6 | 208.4b |
| Allein zu dir, Herr Jesu Christ (v. 4) | 7292b | 33/6 | 16 | 13 | 13 | 0033_6 | 11.2a/b |
| Wie schön leuchtet der Morgenstern (v. 7) | 8359 | 36.4/5 | | | | | 209.2a |
| Wie schön leuchtet der Morgenstern (v. 6) | 8359 | 36/4 | 377 | 85 | 86 | 0036_4 | 209.2b |
| Wie schön leuchtet der Morgenstern (v. 6) | 8359 | 36/4 | 377 | 195 | 195 | 0036_4 | 209.2b |
| Wie schön leuchtet der Morgenstern (v. 6) | 8359 | 36/4 | 377 | 304 | 305 | 0036_4 | 209.2b |
| Nun komm, der Heiden Heiland (v. 8) | 1174 | 36/8 | 264 | 28 | 28 | 0036_8 | 151.2a/b |
| Ich dank dir, lieber Herre (v. 4) | 5354b | 37/6 | 178 | 340 | 341 | 0037_6 | 101.3a/b |
| Aus tiefer Not schrei ich zu dir (v. 5) | 4437 | 38/6 | 31 | 10 | 10 | 0038_6 | 22.1a/b |
| Kommt, laßt euch den Herren lehren (v. 6) | 6543 | 39/7 | 104 | 67 | 67 | 0039_7 | 208.5b/c |
| Wir Christenleut habn jetzund Freud (v. 3) | 2072 | 40/3 | 379 | 320 | 321 | 0040_3 | 210.2a/b |
| Schwing dich auf zu deinem Gott (v. 2) | 4870 | 40/6 | 305 | 142 | 142 | 0040_6 | 172.1a/b |
| Freuet euch, ihr Christen alle (v. 4) | 7880a | 40/8 | 105 | 8 | 8 | 0040_8 | 67.1a/b |
| Jesu, nun sei gepreiset (v. 3) | 8477a | 41/6 | | 11 | 11 | 0041_6; ≈BWV 171/6 | 118.3a; — |
| Verleih uns Frieden gnädlich (complete) | 1945 | 42/7 | 322 | 91 | 91 | 0042_7; Text version: Walter 1566 | 182.2 |
| Verleih uns Frieden gnädlich (complete) | 1945 | 42/7 | 322 | 259 | 259 | 0042_7; Text version: Walter 1566 | 182.2 |
| Du Lebensfürst, Herr Jesu Christ (vv. 1, 13) | 5741 | 43/11 | 81 | 102 | 102 | 0043_11; Spurious | 57.1a |
| In allen meinen Taten (v. 9) | 2293b | 44/7 | 296 | 354 | 355 | 0044_7 | 166.4b |
| O Gott, du frommer Gott (v. 2) | 5206b | 45/7 | 278 | 84 | 85 | 0045_7 | 45.4a/b |
| O großer Gott von Macht (v. 9) | 5101a | 46/6 | | 81 | 82 | 0046_6 | 158.1b |
| Warum betrübst du dich, mein Herz (v. 11) | 1689 | 47/5 | 333 | 94 | 94 | 0047_5 | 189.3a/b |
| Ach Gott und Herr (v. 4) | 2051 | 48/3 | 4 | 279 | 279 | 0048_3 | 2.2a/b |
| Herr Jesu Christ, ich schrei zu dir (v. 12) | 4486 | 48/7 | 144 | 266 | 266 | 0048_7 | 202.4b |
| Herr Jesu Christ, du höchstes Gut | 4486 | 48/7 | 144 | 266 | 266 | 0048_7 | 202.4b |
| In dich hab ich gehoffet, Herr (v. 1) | 2461 | 52/6 | 212 | | | 0052_6 | — |
| Werde munter, mein Gemüte (v. 6) | 6551 | 55/5 | 362 | 95 | 95 | 0055_5 | 206.5a/b |
| Du, o schönes Weltgebäude (v. 6) | 6773 | 56/5 | 72 | 86 | 87 | 0056_5 | 50.2a/b |
| Hast du denn, Jesu, dein Angesicht (v. 6) | 1912a | 57/8 | 231 | 90 | 90 | 0057_8 | 78.1a/b; — |
| Komm, Heiliger Geist, Herre Gott (v. 1) | 7445a | 59/3 | 220 | | | 0059_3; ≈BWV 175/7 | — |
| Es ist genug (v. 5) | 7173 | 60/5 | 91 | 216 | 216 | 0060_5 | 60.1 |
| Nun komm, der Heiden Heiland (v. 8) | 1174 | 62/6 | 265 | 170 | 170 | 0062_6 | 151.1a/b/c |
| Gelobet seist du, Jesu Christ (v. 7) | 1947 | 64/2 | 108 | 160 | 160 | 0064_2 | 69.3a/b |
| Was frag ich nach der Welt (v. 1) | 5206b | 64/4 | 280 | 255 | 255 | 0064_4 | 45.3 |
| Jesu, meine Freude (v. 5) | 8032 | 64/8 | 200 | 138 | 138 | 0064_8 | 116.2a/b |
| Ein Kind geborn zu Bethlehem (v. 4) | 192b | 65/2 | 302 | 12 | 12 | 0065_2 | 169.1b |
| Ich hab in Gottes Herz und Sinn (v. 10) | 7568 | 65/7 | 346 | 41 | 41 | 0065_7 | 194.1b |
| Christ ist erstanden (v. 3) | 8584 | 66/6 | 37 | | | 0066_6 | 25.2 |
| Erschienen ist der herrlich Tag (v. 1) | 1743 | 67/4 | 83 | | | 0067_4 | — |
| Du Friedefürst, Herr Jesu Christ (v. 1) | 4373 | 67/7 | 68 | 42 | 42 | 0067_7 | 49.2; — |
| Es woll uns Gott genädig sein (v. 3) | 7247 | 69/6 | 97 | 332 | 333 | 0069_6 | 66.4b |
| Was Gott tut, das ist wohlgetan (v. 6) | 5629 | 69a/6 | | 292 | 293 | 0069a_6; ≈BWV 12/7 | 193.4c |
| Freu dich sehr, o meine Seele (v. 10) | 6543 | 70/7 | 98 | | | 0070_7 | — |
| Meinen Jesum laß ich nicht, weil ... (v. 5) | 3449 | 70/11 | 243 | 347 | 348 | 0070_11 | 141.4b |
| Was mein Gott will, das g'scheh allzeit (v. 1) | 7568 | 72/6 | 344 | | | 0072_6 | — |
| Von Gott will ich nicht lassen (v. 9) | 5264b | 73/5 | 328 | 191 | 191 | 0073_5 | 185.4b |
| Gott Vater, sende deinen Geist (v. 2) | 2496c | 74/8 | 223 | 369 | 370 | 0074_8 | 128.2b |
| Was Gott tut, das ist wohlgetan (vv. 5–6) | 5629 | 75/7, /14 | | | | 0075_7_14; =BWV 100/6 | — |
| Es woll uns Gott genädig sein (vv. 1, 3) | 7247 | 76/7, /14 | | | | 0076_7_14 | — |
| Wenn einer alle Ding verstünd (v. 8)? | 4431 | 77/6 | 6 | 253 | 253 | 0077_6; No autograph text: added later | 3.3b |
| O Gottes Sohn, Herr Jesu Christ (v. 5)? | 4431 | 77/6 | 6 | 253 | 253 | 0077_6; No autograph text: added later | 3.3b |
| Ach Gott, vom Himmel sieh darein | 4431 | 77/6 | 6 | 253 | 253 | 0077_6; No autograph text: added later | 3.3b |
| Jesu, der du meine Seele (v. 12) | 6804 | 78/7 | 188 | 296 | 297 | 0078_7 | 187.4a/b |
| Nun danket alle Gott (v. 1) | 5142 | 79/3 | 259 | | | 0079_3 | — |
| Nun laßt uns Gott dem Herren (v. 8) | 159 | 79/6 | 267 | | | 0079_6 | — |
| Ein feste Burg ist unser Gott (v. 1) | 7377 | 80.2/1 | | | | | — |
| Ein feste Burg ist unser Gott (v. 4) | 7377 | 80/8 | 76 | 273 | 273 | 0080_8 | 53.4a/b |
| Jesu, meine Freude (v. 2) | 8032 | 81/7 | 197 | 323 | 324 | 0081_7 | 116.3a/b |
| Mit Fried und Freud ich fahr dahin (v. 4) | 3986 | 83/5 | 250 | 324 | 325 | 0083_5 | 144.2a/b |
| Wer weiß, wie nahe mir mein Ende (v. 12) | 2778 | 84/5 | 373 | 112 | 112 | 0084_5 | 205.2a/b/c |
| Ist Gott mein Schild und Helfersmann (v. 4) | 2542 | 85/6 | 216 | 122 | 122 | 0085_6 | 111.1a/b |
| Es ist das Heil uns kommen her (v. 11) | 4430 | 86/6 | 86 | 4 | 4 | 0086_6 | 59.1a/b |
| Selig ist die Seele (v. 9) | 8032 | 87/7 | 201 | 96 | 96 | 0087_7 | 116.4b |
| Wer nur den lieben Gott läßt walten (v. 8) | 2778 | 88/7 | 368 | 104 | 104 | 0088_7 | 205.5a/b |
| Wo soll ich fliehen hin (v. 7) | 2164 | 89/6 | 26 | 281 | 281 | 0089_6 | 20.4a/b |
| Nimm von uns, Herr, du treuer Gott (v. 7) | 2561 | 90/5 | 319 | 267 | 267 | 0090_5 | 181.3b |
| Gelobet seist du, Jesu Christ (v. 7) | 1947 | 91/6 | 109 | 53 | 51 | 0091_6 | 69.2a/b |
| Ich hab in Gottes Herz und Sinn (v. 12) | 7568 | 92/9 | 347 | | | 0092_9 | — |
| Wer nur den lieben Gott läßt walten (v. 7) | 2778 | 93/7 | 369 | | | 0093_7 | — |
| Was frag ich nach der Welt (vv. 7–8) | 5206b | 94/8 | 281 | 290 | 291 | 0094_8 | 45.5 |
| Wenn mein Stündlein vorhanden ist (v. 4) | 4482a,b | 95/7 | 356 | | | 0095_7 | 201.6b |
| Herr Christ, der einge Gottessohn (v. 5) | 4297a | 96/6 | 128 | 302 | 303 | 0096_6 | 81.2a/b |
| In allen meinen Taten (v. 9) | 2293b | 97/9 | 297 | | | 0097_9; ≈BWV 392 | 166.9b/c |
| Was Gott tut, das ist wohlgetan (v. 6) | 5629 | 99/6 | 341 | | | 0099_6 | — |
| Was Gott tut, das ist wohlgetan (v. 6) | 5629 | 100/6 | | | | 0100_6; =BWV 75/7, /14 | 193; — |
| Nimm von uns, Herr, du treuer Gott (v. 7) | 2561 | 101/7 | 318 | 291 | 292 | 0101_7 | 181.1a/b |
| So wahr ich lebe, spricht dein Gott (v. 6) | 2561 | 102/7 | 320 | 110 | 110 | 0102_7 | 181.2b |
| Barmherzger Vater, höchster Gott (v. 9) | 7568 | 103/6 | 348 | 120 | 120 | 0103_6 | 194.6b/c |
| Barmherzger Vater, höchster Gott (v. 9) | 7568 | 103/6 | 348 | 348 | 349 | 0103_6 | 194.6b/c |
| Der Herr ist mein getreuer Hirt (v. 1) | 4457 | 104/6 | 13 | 125 | 125 | 0104_6 | 10.2; — |
| Der Herr ist mein getreuer Hirt (v. 1) | 4457 | 104/6 | 13 | 325 | 326 | 0104_6 | 10.2b |
| Jesu, der du meine Seele (v. 11) | 6804 | 105/6 | | | | 0105_6 | 187.6b |
| Was willst du dich betrüben (v. 7) | 5264b | 107/7 | 327 | | | 0107_7 | — |
| Gott Vater, sende deinen Geist (v. 10) | 2496c | 108/6 | 224 | 46 | 45 | 0108_6 | 128.1b |
| Wir Christenleut habn jetzund Freud (v. 5) | 2072 | 110/7 | 380 | 57 | 55 | 0110_7 | 210.1a/b |
| Was mein Gott will, das g'scheh allzeit (v. 4) | 7568 | 111/6 | 345 | | | 0111_6 | — |
| Der Herr ist mein getreuer Hirt (v. 5) | 4457 | 112/5 | 14 | 312 | 313 | 0112_5 | 10.3a/b |
| Der Herr ist mein getreuer Hirt (v. 5) | 4457 | 112/5 | 14 | 352 | 353 | 0112_5 | 10.3a/b |
| Herr Jesu Christ, du höchstes Gut (v. 1) | 4486 | 113/1 | | | | 0113_1 | — |
| Herr Jesu Christ, du höchstes Gut (v. 8) | 4486 | 113/8 | 142 | 293 | 294 | 0113_8 | 202.3a/b |
| Ach lieben Christen, seid getrost (v. 6) | 4441a | 114/7 | 386 | 300 | 301 | 0114_7 | 212.4a/b |
| Mache dich, mein Geist, bereit (v. 10) | 6274a | 115/6 | 312 | 38 | 38 | 0115_6 | 179.1b/c |
| Du Friedefürst, Herr Jesu Christ (v. 7) | 4373 | 116/6 | 69 | | | 0116_6 | — |
| Sei Lob und Ehr dem höchsten Gut (vv. 4, 9) | 4430 | 117/4, /9 | 90 | 248 | 248 | 0117_4_9 | 59.3b |
| Sei Lob und Ehr dem höchsten Gut (vv. 4, 9) | 4430 | 117/4, /9 | 90 | 353 | 354 | 0117_4_9 | 59.3a/c |
| Herr Gott, dich loben wir (vv. 38–41) | 8652 | 119/9 | 134 | | | 0119_9 | — |
| Herr Gott, dich loben wir (vv. 34–41) | 8652 | 120/6 | 135 | | | 0120_6 | — |
| Lobe den Herren, den mächtigen ... (vv. 4–5) | 1912a | 120a/8 | 230 | | | 0120a_8; ≈BWV 137/5 | — |
| Christum wir sollen loben schon (v. 8) | 297 | 121/6 | 42 | 55 | 56 | 0121_6 | 29.1a/b |
| Das neugeborne Kindelein (v. 4) | 491 | 122/6 | 57 | 52 | 53 | 0122_6 | 37.1a/b |
| Das neugeborne Kindelein (v. 4) | 491 | 122/6 | 57 | 178 | 178 | 0122_6 | 37.1a/b |
| Liebster Immanuel, Herzog ... (v. 6) | 4932c | 123/6 | 229 | 194 | 194 | 0123_6 | 132.1a/b |
| Meinen Jesum laß ich nicht, weil ... (v. 6) | 3449 | 124/6 | 246 | | | 0124_6 | — |
| Mit Fried und Freud ich fahr dahin (v. 4) | 3986 | 125/6 | 251 | | | 0125_6 | — |
| Verleih uns Frieden gnädlich (complete) | 1945 | 126/6 | 321 | 215 | 215 | 0126_6; Text version: Walter 1566 | 182.1b |
| Herr Jesu Christ, wahr Mensch und Gott (v. 8) | 2570 | 127/5 | 147 | 283bis | 384 | 0127_5 | 199.1a/b |
| O Jesu, meine Lust (v. 4) | 5206b | 128/5 | 279 | | | 0128_5 | — |
| Gelobet sei der Herr, mein Gott (v. 5) | 5206b | 129/5 | | | | 0129_5 | 45; — |
| Herr Gott, dich loben alle wir (v. 11) | 368 | 130/6 | 131 | | | 0130_6; Bach struck v. 12 in cantata | 105.3b |
| Ich freue mich in dir (v. 4) | 5187 | 133/6 | 181 | 61 | 60 | 0133_6 | 164.1a/b |
| Ach Herr, mich armen Sünder (v. 6) | 5385a | 135/6 | 156 | | | 0135_6 | — |
| Wo soll ich fliehen hin (v. 9) | 2164 | 136/6 | 27 | 330 | 331 | 0136_6 | 20.5b |
| Lobe den Herren, den mächtigen ... (v. 5) | 1912a | 137/5 | 230 | | | 0137_5; ≈BWV 120a/8 | 78.2c |
| Wohl dem, der sich auf seinen Gott (v. 5) | 2383 | 139/6 | 238 | | | 0139_6 | — |
| Wachet auf, ruft uns die Stimme (v. 3) | 8405 | 140/7 | 329 | 179 | 179 | 0140_7 | 186.1a/b/c |
| Was Gott tut, das ist wohlgetan (v. 1) | 5629 | 144/3 | 338 | 64 | 65 | 0144_3 | 193.1 |
| Was mein Gott will, das g'scheh allzeit (v. 1) | 7568 | 144/6 | 343 | 265 | 265 | 0144_6 | 194.4 |
| Auf, mein Herz, des Herren Tag (v. 1) | 3432b | 145/a | 209 | 337 | 338 | 0145a | 123.2a |
| Erschienen ist der herrlich Tag (v. 4) | 1743 | 145/5 | 84 | 17 | 17 | 0145_5 | 16.1a/b |
| Freu dich sehr, o meine Seele (v. 1)? | 6551 | 146/8 | 360 | | | 0146_8; Text: proposal Martin Petzold | — |
| Jesu, meiner Seelen Wonne (vv. 6, 16) | 6551 | 147/6, /10 | | | | 0147_6_10; aka Jesu, Joy of Man's Desiring | — |
| Wo soll ich fliehen hin | 2164 | 148/6 | 29 | 25 | 25 | 0148_6; Textless in cantata | 20.1b |
| Herzlich lieb hab ich dich, o Herr (v. 3) | 8326 | 149/7 | 155 | | | 0149_7 | — |
| Lobt Gott, ihr Christen, allzugleich (v. 8) | 198 | 151/5 | 235 | 54 | 54 | 0151_5 | 127.3a/b |
| Schau, lieber Gott, wie meine Feind (v. 1) | 4431 | 153/1 | 5 | 3 | 3 | 0153_1 | 3.1b |
| Befiehl du deine Wege (v. 5) | 5385a | 153/5 | 160 | 21 | 21 | 0153_5 | 92.3b |
| Ach Gott, wie manches Herzeleid (vv. 16–18) | 553a | 153/9 | 9 | 217 | 217 | 0153_9 | 87.1a/b |
| Jesu, meiner Seelen Wonne (v. 2) | 6551 | 154/3 | 365 | 233 | 233 | 0154_3; ≈BWV 359 | 206.1a/b/3b |
| Meinen Jesum laß ich nicht, weil ... (v. 6) | 3449 | 154/8 | 244 | 152 | 152 | 0154_8 | 141.2 |
| Es ist das Heil uns kommen her (v. 12) | 4430 | 155/5 | 88 | 334 | 335 | 0155_5 | 59.2a/b |
| Herr, wie du willst, so schicks ... (v. 1) | 4438 | 156/6 | 150 | 316 | 317 | 0156_6 | 23.2 |
| Meinen Jesum laß ich nicht, weil ... (v. 6) | 3449 | 157/5 | 245 | | | 0157_5 | — |
| Christ lag in Todesbanden (v. 5) | 7012a | 158/4 | 40 | | | 0158_4; ≈BWV 279 | 26.4b |
| Jesu Leiden, Pein und Tod (v. 33) | 6288b | 159/5 | 194 | 59 | 61 | 0159_5 | 115.1a/b |
| Herzlich tut mich verlangen (v. 4) | 5385a | 161/6 | 161 | 270 | 270 | 0161_6 | 92.13b/c |
| Alle Menschen müssen sterben (v. 7) | 6783 | 162/6 | 18 | | | 0162_6 | — |
| Herr Christ, der einge Gottessohn (v. 5) | 4297a | 164/6 | 127 | 101 | 101 | 0164_6 | 81.1a/b |
| Nun laßt uns Gott dem Herren (v. 5) | 159 | 165/6 | 266 | | | 0165_6 | — |
| Wer weiß, wie nahe mir mein Ende (v. 1) | 2778 | 166/6 | 372 | 204 | 204 | 0166_6 | 205.3 |
| Nun lob, mein Seel, den Herren (v. 5) | 8244 | 167/5 | | | | 0167_5 | — |
| Herr Jesu Christ, du höchstes Gut (v. 8) | 4486 | 168/6 | 143 | 92 | 92 | 0168_6 | 202.2a/b |
| Nun bitten wir den Heiligen Geist (v. 3) | 2029 | 169/7 | 256 | 97 | 97 | 0169_7 | 147.2a/b |
| Jesu, nun sei gepreiset (v. 2) | 8477a | 171/6 | 204 | | | 0171_6; ≈BWV 141/6; BGA: v. 3 per P 94 | — |
| Wie schön leuchtet der Morgenstern (v. 4) | 8359 | 172/6 | 376 | 322 | 323 | 0172_6 | 209.4b |
| Herzlich lieb hab ich dich, o Herr (v. 1) | 8326 | 174/5 | 153 | 56 | 58 | 0174_5 | 91.2 |
| O Gottes Geist, mein Trost und Rat (v. 9) | 7445a | 175/7 | 220 | | | 0175_7; ≈BWV 59/3 | 126.1b |
| Was alle Weisheit in der Welt (v. 8) | 7246 | 176/6 | 45 | 119 | 119 | 0176_6 | 65.2 |
| Ich ruf zu dir, Herr Jesu Christ (v. 5) | 7400 | 177/5 | 183 | 71 | 71 | 0177_5 | 103.2a/b/c |
| Wo Gott der Herr nicht bei uns hält (vv. 7–8) | 4441a | 178/7 | 384 | | | 0178_7 | — |
| Ich armer Mensch, ich armer Sünder (v. 1) | 2778 | 179/6 | 371 | 338 | 339 | 0179_6 | 205.6a/b |
| Schmücke dich, o liebe Seele (v. 9) | 6923 | 180/7 | 304 | 22 | 22 | 0180_7 | 171.1a/b/c |
| Zeuch ein zu deinen Toren (v. 5) | 5267 | 183/5 | 126 | 123 | 123 | 0183_5 | 80.3b |
| O Herre Gott, dein göttlich Wort (v. 8) | 5690 | 184/5 | 283 | 14 | 14 | 0184_5 | 159.1a/b/c |
| Ich ruf zu dir, Herr Jesu Christ (v. 1) | 7400 | 185/6 | 184 | | | 0185_6 | 103.3b |
| Singen wir aus Herzensgrund (v. 4) | 4816 | 187/7 | 308 | 109 | 109 | 0187_7 | 33.1 |
| Auf meinen lieben Gott (v. 1) | 2164 | 188/6 | 25 | | | 0188_6 | — |
| Jesu, nun sei gepreiset (v. 2) | 8477a | 190/7 | 205 | 326 | 327 | 0190_7 | 118.2 |
| Treuer Gott, ich muss dir klagen (v. 6) | 6543 | 194/6 | 100 | 63 | 64 | 0194_6 | 208.2b |
| Treuer Gott, ich muss dir klagen (v. 6) | 6543 | 194/6 | 100 | 256 | 256 | 0194_6 | 208.2b |
| Wach auf, mein Herz, und singe (vv. 9–10) | 159 | 194/12 | 268 | 93 | 93 | 0194_12 | 152.2a/b/c |
| Wach auf, mein Herz, und singe (vv. 9–10) | 159 | 194/12 | 268 | 257 | 257 | 0194_12 | 152.2a/b/c |
| Nun danket all und bringet Ehr (v. 1) | 198 | 195/6 | 236 | | | 0195_6 | — |
| Nun bitten wir den Heiligen Geist (v. 3) | 2029 | 197/5 | 255 | 83 | 84 | 0197_5 | 147.3a/b |
| Wer nur den lieben Gott läßt walten (v. 7) | 2778 | 197/10 | 370 | 66 | 62 | 0197_10 | 205.7a/b |
| Ich freue mich in dir (v. 4) | 5206b | 197a/7 | | | | 0197a_7; ≈BWV 398 | 45.2b |
| From motets | (Zahn) | **226–229** | (389) | (CPE) | (Rie.) | (↑ Go to top of table ↑) | (BC F) |
| Komm, Heiliger Geist, Herre Gott (v. 3) | 7445a | 226/2 | 221 | 69 | 69 | 0226_2 | 126.2a/b/c |
| Jesu, meine Freude (vv. 1, 6) | 8032 | 227/1, 11 | 196 | 263 | 263 | 0227_1_11 | 116.5 |
| Jesu, meine Freude (v. 2) | 8032 | 227/3 | 198 | | | 0227_3; SSATB | 116.6a/b |
| Jesu, meine Freude (v. 4) | 8032 | 227/7 | 199 | 283 | 283 | 0227_7 | 116.7a/b |
| Komm, Jesu, komm (v. 11) | | 229/2 | 222 | | | 0229_2; Not on a pre-existing tune | — |
| From St Matthew Passion | (Zahn) | **244–244b** | (389) | (CPE) | (Rie.) | (↑ Go to top of table ↑) | (BC F) |
| Herzliebster Jesu (v. 1) | 983 | 244/3 | 166 | 78 | 78 | 0244_3 | 93.3 |
| O Welt, sieh hier dein Leben (v. 5) | 2293b | 244/10 | 294 | 117 | 117 | 0244_10 | 166.6b |
| O Haupt voll Blut und Wunden (v. 5) | 5385a | 244/15 | 163 | 98 | 98 | 0244_15; ≈BWV 244/17 | 92.5c |
| O Haupt voll Blut und Wunden (v. 6) | 5385a | 244/17 | 163 | 98 | 98 | 0244_17; ≈BWV 244/15 | 92.5c |
| Was mein Gott will, das g'scheh allzeit (v. 1) | 7568 | 244/25 | 342 | 115 | 115 | 0244_25 | 194.7 |
| Meinen Jesum laß ich nicht, weil ... (v. 6) | 3449 | 244b/29 | 247 | | | 0244b_29 | — |
| In dich hab ich gehoffet, Herr (v. 5) | 2461 | 244/32 | 213 | 118 | 118 | 0244_32 | 108.2a/b |
| O Welt, sieh hier dein Leben (v. 3) | 2293b | 244/37 | 292 | 50 | 50 | 0244_37 | 166.7b |
| Werde munter, mein Gemüte (v. 6) | 6551 | 244/40 | 361 | 121 | 121 | 0244_40 | 206.6a/b/c |
| Befiehl du deine Wege (v. 1) | 5385a | 244/44 | 159 | 87 | 80 | 0244_44 | 92.6b |
| Herzliebster Jesu (v. 4) | 983 | 244/46 | 167 | 105 | 105 | 0244_46 | 93.4a/b |
| O Haupt voll Blut und Wunden (vv. 1–2) | 5385a | 244/54 | 162 | 74 | 74 | 0244_54 | 92.7 |
| O Haupt voll Blut und Wunden (v. 9) | 5385a | 244/62 | 164 | 89 | 89 | 0244_62 | 92.8a/b |
| From St John Passion | (Zahn) | **245** | (389) | (CPE) | (Rie.) | (↑ Go to top of table ↑) | (BC F) |
| Herzliebster Jesu (v. 7) | 983 | 245/3 | 168 | 58 | 59 | 0245_3; Two versions (2nd in CPE, Rie.,...) | 93.1a/b/c |
| Vater unser im Himmelreich (v. 4) | 2561 | 245/5 | 317 | 47 | 47 | 0245_5; Two versions (1st =BWV 416) | 181.4a/c |
| O Welt, sieh hier dein Leben (vv. 3–4) | 2293b | 245/11 | 293 | 62 | 63 | 0245_11; ≈BWV 395 | 166.5a/b/c; — |
| Jesu Leiden, Pein und Tod (v. 10) | 6288b | 245/14 | 192 | 82 | 83 | 0245_14 | 115.2a/b |
| Christus, der uns selig macht (v. 1) | 6283b | 245/15 | 49 | 80 | 81 | 0245_15 | 31.2 |
| Herzliebster Jesu (vv. 8–9) | 983 | 245/17 | 169 | 111 | 111 | 0245_17 | 93.2a/b |
| Durch dein Gefängnis, Gottes Sohn (1 v.) | 2383 | 245/22 | 239 | 309 | 310 | 0245_22 | 137.3b |
| Valet will ich dir geben (v. 3) | 5404a | 245/26 | 315 | 108 | 108 | 0245_26 | 180.2a/b |
| Jesu Leiden, Pein und Tod (v. 20) | 6288b | 245/28 | 193 | 106 | 106 | 0245_28 | 115.3a/b |
| Christus, der uns selig macht (v. 8) | 6283b | 245/37 | 50 | 113 | 113 | 0245_37 | 31.3a/b |
| Herzlich lieb hab ich dich, o Herr (v. 3) | 8326 | 245/40 | 154 | 107 | 107 | 0245_40 | 91.3a/b |
| From Christmas Oratorio | (Zahn) | **248** | (389) | (CPE) | (Rie.) | (↑ Go to top of table ↑) | (BC F) |
| Wie soll ich dich empfangen (v. 1) | 5385a | 248/5 | 165 | 344 | 345 | 0248_5 | 92.9b |
| Vom Himmel hoch, da komm ich her (v. 13) | 346 | 248/9 | | 45 | 46 | 0248_9 | 184.2b |
| Ermuntre dich, mein schwacher Geist (v. 9) | 5741 | 248/12 | 80 | 9 | 9 | 0248_12 | 57.2a/b |
| Ermuntre dich, mein schwacher Geist (v. 9) | 5741 | 248/12 | 80 | 360 | 361 | 0248_12 | 57.2a/b |
| Schaut, schaut, was ist für Wunder dar (v. 8) | 346 | 248/17 | 323 | | | 0248_17 | 184.3b |
| Wir singen dir, Immanuel (v. 2) | 346 | 248/23 | | 343 | 344 | 0248_23 | 184.3b |
| Gelobet seist du, Jesu Christ (v. 7) | 1947 | 248/28 | 110 | | | 0248_28 | 69.4a/b |
| Fröhlich soll mein Herze springen (v. 15) | 6461 | 248/33 | 335 | 139 | 139 | 0248_33 | 190.2b |
| Lasst Furcht und Pein (v. 4) | 2072 | 248/35 | 381 | 359 | 360 | 0248_35 | 210.3b |
| Hilf, Herr Jesu, laß gelingen (v. 5) | N/1 | 248/42 | | 367 | 368 | 0248_42 | 98.1c |
| Nun, liebe Seel, nun ist es Zeit (v. 5) | 2461 | 248/46 | 214 | 77 | 77 | 0248_46 | 108.3b |
| Ihr Gestirn, ihr hohlen Lüfte (v. 9) | 3614 | 248/53 | 114 | 34 | 35 | 0248_53 | 73.1b |
| Ich steh an deiner Krippen hier (v. 1) | 4429a | 248/59 | 263 | 361 | 362 | 0248_59 | 150.2b |
| Ihr Christen, auserkoren (v. 4) | 5385a | 248/64 | | | | 0248_64 | 92.14b |
| **Three Wedding Chorales** | (Zahn) | **250–252** | (389) | (CPE) | (Rie.) | (↑ Go to top of table ↑) | (BC F) |
| Was Gott tut, das ist wohlgetan | 5629 | 250 | 339 | 346 | 347 | 0250; Three Wedding Chorales No. 1 | 193.3 |
| Sei Lob und Ehr dem höchsten Gut | 4430 | 251 | 89 | 328 | 329 | 0251; Three Wedding Chorales No. 2 | 59.4 |
| Nun danket alle Gott | 5142 | 252 | 258 | 329 | 330 | 0252; Three Wedding Chorales No. 3 | 148.2 |
| **186 four-part chorales in BGA Vol. 39** | (Zahn) | **253–438** | (389) | (CPE) | (Rie.) | (↑ Go to top of table ↑) | (BC F) |
| Ach bleib bei uns, Herr Jesu Christ | 493 | 253 | 1 | 177 | 177 | 0253; ≈BWV 414 | 35.1 |
| Ach Gott, erhör mein Seufzen | 1831a | 254 | 2 | 186 | 186 | 0254 | 1.1 |
| Ach Gott und Herr | 2051 | 255 | 3 | 40 | 40 | 0255 | 2.1 |
| Ach lieben Christen, seid getrost | 4441a | 256 | 385 | 31 | 31 | 0256 | 212.3 |
| Wär Gott nicht mit uns diese Zeit | 4441a | 257 | 388 | 284 | 285 | 0257 | 212.1 |
| Wo Gott der Herr nicht bei uns hält | 4441a | 258 | 383 | 335 | 336 | 0258; ≈BWV 488: Schemelli No. 881 (63) | 212.2 |
| Ach, was soll ich Sünder machen | 3573b | 259 | 10 | 39 | 39 | 0259 | 5.1 |
| Allein Gott in der Höh sei Ehr | 4457 | 260 | 12 | 249 | 249 | 0260 | 10.1 |
| Allein zu dir, Herr Jesu Christ | 7292b | 261 | 15 | 358 | 359 | 0261 | 11.1 |
| Alle Menschen müssen sterben | 6778 | 262 | 17 | 153 | 153 | 0262 | 8.1 |
| Alles ist an Gottes Segen | 3842f | 263 | 19 | 128 | 128 | 0263 | 12.1 |
| Als der gütige Gott | 1645 | 264 | 20 | 159 | 159 | 0264 | 13.1 |
| Als Jesus Christus in der Nacht | 258 | 265 | 21 | 180 | 180 | 0265 | 14.1 |
| Als vierzig Tag nach Ostern warn | 1743 | 266 | 22 | 208 | 208 | 0266 | 15.1 |
| An Wasserflüssen Babylon | 7663 | 267 | 23 | 5 | 5 | 0267 | 17.1a/b/c |
| Ein Lämmlein geht und trägt die Schuld | 7663 | 267 | 23 | 308 | 309 | 0267 | 17.1a/b/c |
| Auf, auf, mein Herz, und du mein ganzer ... | 824 | 268 | 24 | 124 | 124 | 0268 | 19.1 |
| Aus meines Herzens Grunde | 5269 | 269 | 30 | 1 | 1 | 0269 | 21.1 |
| Befiehl du deine Wege | 5385a | 270 | 157 | 285 | 286 | 0270 | 92.1 |
| Befiehl du deine Wege | 5385a | 271 | 158 | 366 | 367 | 0271 | 92.2 |
| Befiehl du deine Wege | 5393 | 272 | 32 | 339 | 340 | 0272; Setting likely by C. P. E. Bach | 136.2 |
| Christ, der du bist der helle Tag | 384 | 273 | 33 | 230 | 230 | 0273 | 24.1 |
| Christe, der du bist Tag und Licht | 343 | 274 | 34 | 245 | 245 | 0274 | 27.1 |
| Christe, du Beistand deiner Kreuzgemeine | 993 | 275 | 35 | 210 | 210 | 0275 | 28.1 |
| Christ ist erstanden | 8584 | 276 | 36 | 197 | 197 | 0276 | 25.1 |
| Christ lag in Todesbanden | 7012a | 277 | 38 | 15 | 15 | 0277 | 26.2 |
| Christ lag in Todesbanden | 7012a | 278 | 39 | 370 | 371 | 0278 | 26.1 |
| Christ lag in Todesbanden | 7012a | 279 | 40 | 261 | 261 | 0279; ≈BWV 158/4 | 26.4b |
| Christ unser Herr zum Jordan kam | 7246 | 280 | 43 | 65 | 66 | 0280 | 65.1 |
| Christus, der ist mein Leben | 132 | 281 | 46 | 7 | 6 | 0281 | 30.1 |
| Christus, der ist mein Leben | 132 | 282 | 47 | 315 | 316 | 0282; Included in BWV 95/1 | 30.2 |
| Christus, der uns selig macht | 6283b | 283 | 48 | 198 | 198 | 0283 | 31.1 |
| Christus, der uns selig macht | 6283b | 283 | 48 | 306 | 307 | 0283 | 31.1 |
| Christus ist erstanden, hat überwunden | 6240c | 284 | 51 | 200 | 200 | 0284 | 32.1 |
| Da der Herr Christ zu Tische saß | 2503 | 285 | 52 | 196 | 196 | 0285 | 34.1 |
| Danket dem Herrn, denn er ist sehr... | 12 | 286 | 53 | 228 | 228 | 0286 | 183.1 |
| Dank sei Gott in der Höhe | 5391 | 287 | 54 | 310 | 311 | 0287 | 119.1 |
| Das alte Jahr vergangen ist | 381c | 288 | 55 | 162 | 162 | 0288 | 36.1 |
| Das alte Jahr vergangen ist | 381c | 289 | 56 | 313 | 314 | 0289 | 36.2 |
| Das walt Gott Vater und Gott Sohn | 673 | 290 | 58 | 224 | 224 | 0290 | 38.1 |
| Das walt mein Gott | 4217 | 291 | 59 | 75 | 75 | 0291 | 39.1 |
| Den Vater dort oben | 4795 | 292 | 60 | 239 | 239 | 0292 | 40.1 |
| Der du bist drei in Einigkeit | 335 | 293 | 61 | 154 | 154 | 0293 | 42.1 |
| Der Tag, der ist so freudenreich | 7870 | 294 | 62 | 158 | 158 | 0294 | 43.1 |
| Des Heilgen Geistes reiche Gnad | 3706 | 295 | 63 | 207 | 207 | 0295 | 178.1 |
| Die Nacht ist kommen | 5001 | 296 | 64 | 231 | 231 | 0296 | 44.1 |
| Die Sonn hat sich mit ihrem Glanz | 923 | 297 | 65 | 232 | 232 | 0297; ≈BWV 447: Schemelli No. 40 (3) | 161.1 |
| Dies sind die heilgen zehn Gebot | 1951 | 298 | 66 | 127 | 127 | 0298 | 46.1 |
| Dir, dir, Jehova, will ich singen | 3068 | 299 | 67 | 209 | 209 | 0299; =AMBII 39; ≈BWV 452: S 397 (32) | 47.1 |
| Du großer Schmerzensmann | 5159 | 300 | 70 | 164 | 167 | 0300 | 51.1 |
| Du, o schönes Weltgebäude | 6773 | 301 | 71 | 137 | 134 | 0301 | 50.1 |
| Ein feste Burg ist unser Gott | 7377 | 302 | 74 | 20 | 20 | 0302 | 53.1b |
| Ein feste Burg ist unser Gott | 7377 | 303 | 75 | 250 | 250 | 0303 | 53.2b |
| Eins ist not, ach Herr, dies Eine | 7127 | 304 | 77 | 280 | 280 | 0304 | 54.1 |
| Erbarm dich mein, o Herre Gott | 5851 | 305 | 78 | 33 | 34 | 0305 | 55.1 |
| Erstanden ist der heilge Christ | 1746 | 306 | 85 | 176 | 176 | 0306 | 58.1 |
| Es ist gewißlich an der Zeit | 4429a | 307 | 262 | 260 | 260 | 0307 | 150.1 |
| Es spricht der Unweisen Mund wohl | 4436 | 308 | 92 | 27 | 27 | 0308 | 62.1 |
| Es stehn vor Gottes Throne | 4298 | 309 | 93 | 166 | 166 | 0309 | 63.1 |
| Es wird schier der letzte Tag herkommen | 1423 | 310 | 94 | 238 | 238 | 0310 | 64.1 |
| Es woll uns Gott genädig sein | 7247 | 311 | 95 | 16 | 16 | 0311 | 66.2 |
| Es woll uns Gott genädig sein | 7247 | 312 | 96 | 351 | 352 | 0312 | 66.1 |
| Für Freuden laßt uns springen | 2339 | 313 | 106 | 163 | 163 | 0313 | 68.1 |
| Gelobet seist du, Jesu Christ | 1947 | 314 | 107 | 287 | 288 | 0314 | 69.1 |
| Gib dich zufrieden und sei stille | 7417a | 315 | 111 | 271 | 271 | 0315 | 70.1 |
| Gott, der du selber bist das Licht | 5814 | 316 | 112 | 225 | 225 | 0316 | 71.1 |
| Gott der Vater wohn uns bei | 8507 | 317 | 113 | 134 | 135 | 0317 | 72.1 |
| Gottes Sohn ist kommen | 3294 | 318 | 115 | 18 | 18 | 0318 | 143.1a/b |
| Gott hat das Evangelium | 1788 | 319 | 116 | 181 | 181 | 0319 | 74.1 |
| Gott lebet noch | 7951 | 320 | 117 | 234 | 234 | 0320; ≈BWV 461: Schemelli No. 488 (37) | 75.1 |
| Gottlob, es geht nunmehr zu Ende | 2855 | 321 | 118 | 192 | 192 | 0321 | 77.1 |
| Gott sei gelobet und gebenedeiet | 8078 | 322 | 119 | 70 | 70 | 0322 | 76.1 |
| Gott sei uns gnädig und barmherzig | 7372 | 323 | 120 | 319 | 320 | 0323; Tune: German Magnificat (metric) | 140.2 |
| Meine Seele erhebet den Herren | 7372~ | 324 | 121 | 130 | 130 | 0324; Tune: German Magnificat (chant) | 140.1 |
| Heilig, heilig (or); Sanctus, Sanctus Dominus Deus Sabaoth | 8633 | 325 | 123 | 235 | 235 | 0325 | 79.1 |
| Heilig, heilig (or); Sanctus, Sanctus Dominus Deus Sabaoth | 8633 | 325 | 123 | 318 | 319 | 0325 | 79.1 |
| Herr Gott, dich loben alle wir | 368 | 326 | 129 | 167 | 164 | 0326 | 105.1 |
| Vor deinen Thron tret ich hiermit | 368 | 327 | 132 | 333 | 334 | 0327 | 105.2 |
| Herr Gott, dich loben wir | 8652 | 328 | 133 | 205 | 205 | 0328 | 83.1 |
| Herr, ich denk an jene Zeit | 4840 | 329 | 136 | 212 | 212 | 0329 | 134.1 |
| Herr, ich habe mißgehandelt | 3695 | 330 | 137 | 35 | 33 | 0330 | 84.2 |
| Herr, ich habe mißgehandelt | 3695 | 331 | 138 | 286 | 287 | 0331 | 84.1b |
| Herr Jesu Christ, dich zu uns wend | 625 | 332 | 139 | 136 | 136 | 0332 | 85.1 |
| Herr Jesu Christ, du hast bereit't | 4711 | 333 | 140 | 226 | 226 | 0333 | 86.1 |
| Herr Jesu Christ, du höchstes Gut | 4486 | 334 | 141 | 73 | 73 | 0334 | 202.1 |
| Herr Jesu Christ, meins Lebens Licht | 314 | 335 | 145 | 294 | 295 | 0335 | 170.1a/b |
| O Jesu, du mein Bräutigam | 314 | 335 | 145 | 236 | 236 | 0335 | 170.1a/b |
| Herr Jesu Christ, wahr Mensch und Gott | 423 | 336 | 146 | 189 | 189 | 0336 | 88.1 |
| Herr, nun laß in Friede | 3302 | 337 | 148 | 190 | 190 | 0337 | 89.1 |
| Herr, straf mich nicht in deinem Zorn | 4606a | 338 | 149 | 221 | 221 | 0338 | 90.1 |
| Wer in dem Schutz des Höchsten ist | 4438 | 339 | 151 | 144 | 144 | 0339 | 23.1a/b |
| Herr, wie du willst, so schick's mit mir | 4438 | 339 | 151 | 317 | 318 | 0339 | 23.1a/b |
| Herzlich lieb hab ich dich, o Herr | 8326 | 340 | 152 | 277 | 277 | 0340 | 91.1 |
| Heut ist, o Mensch, ein großer Trauertag | 8569(A) | 341 | 170 | 168 | 168 | 0341 | 94.1A |
| Heut triumphieret Gottes Sohn | 2585 | 342 | 171 | 79 | 79 | 0342 | 95.1 |
| Hilf, Gott, daß mirs gelinge | 4329 | 343 | 172 | 199 | 199 | 0343 | 96.1 |
| Hilf, Gott, daß mirs gelinge | 4329 | 343 | 172 | 301 | 302 | 0343 | 96.1 |
| Hilf, Herr Jesu, laß gelingen | 3687a | 344 | 173 | 155 | 155 | 0344 | 97.1 |
| Ich bin ja, Herr, in deiner Macht | 5878 | 345 | 174 | 251 | 251 | 0345 | 99.1 |
| Ich dank dir, Gott, für all Wohltat | 8090b | 346 | 175 | 223 | 223 | 0346 | 100.1 |
| Ich dank dir, lieber Herre | 5354b | 347 | 176 | 2 | 2 | 0347 | 101.2 |
| Ich dank dir, lieber Herre | 5354b | 348 | 177 | 272 | 272 | 0348 | 101.1 |
| Ich dank dir schon durch deinen Sohn | 247b | 349 | 179 | 188 | 188 | 0349 | 4.1 |
| Ich danke dir, o Gott, in deinem Throne | 3199 | 350 | 180 | 229 | 229 | 0350 | 139.1 |
| Ich hab mein Sach Gott heimgestellt | 1679 | 351 | 182 | 19 | 19 | 0351 | 102.1 |
| Jesu, der du meine Seele | 6804 | 352 | 185 | 37 | 37 | 0352 | 187.3 |
| Jesu, der du meine Seele | 6804 | 353 | 186 | 269 | 269 | 0353 | 187.1 |
| Jesu, der du meine Seele | 6804 | 354 | 187 | 368 | 369 | 0354 | 187.2 |
| Jesu, der du selbsten wohl | 6335 | 355 | 189 | 169 | 169 | 0355 | 112.1 |
| Jesu, du mein liebstes Leben | 7891 | 356 | 190 | 243 | 243 | 0356 | 113.1 |
| Jesu, Jesu, du bist mein | 6446 | 357 | 191 | 244 | 244 | 0357; ≈BWV 470: Schemelli No. 741 (53) | 114.1 |
| Jesu, meine Freude | 8032 | 358 | 195 | 355 | 356 | 0358 | 116.1 |
| Jesu meiner Seelen Wonne | 6551 | 359 | 363 | 364 | 365 | 0359 | 206.1b |
| Jesu, meiner Seelen Wonne | 6551 | 360 | 364 | 349 | 350 | 0360 | 206.2 |
| Jesu, meines Herzens Freud | 4798d | 361 | 202 | 264 | 264 | 0361 | 117.1 |
| Jesu, nun sei gepreiset | 8477a | 362 | 203 | 252 | 252 | 0362 | 118.1 |
| Jesus Christus, unser Heiland, der von uns ... | 1576 | 363 | 206 | 30 | 30 | 0363 | 121.1 |
| Jesus Christus, unser Heiland, der den Tod ... | 1978 | 364 | 207 | 174 | 174 | 0364 | 120.1 |
| Jesus, meine Zuversicht | 3432b | 365 | 208 | 175 | 175 | 0365 | 123.1 |
| Ihr Gestirn, ihr hohlen Lüfte | 3703 | 366 | 210 | 161 | 161 | 0366 | 104.1 |
| In allen meinen Taten | 2276 | 367 | 211 | 140 | 140 | 0367 | 107.1 |
| In dulci jubilo | 4947 | 368 | 215 | 143 | 143 | 0368 | 110.1 |
| Keinen hat Gott verlassen | 5395 | 369 | 217 | 129 | 129 | 0369 | 124.1 |
| Komm, Gott Schöpfer, Heiliger Geist | 295 | 370 | 218 | 187 | 187 | 0370 | 125.1 |
| Kyrie, Gott Vater in Ewigkeit | 8600 | 371 | 225 | 132 | 132 | 0371 | 129.1 |
| Lass, o Herr, dein Ohr sich neigen | 6863 | 372 | 226 | 218 | 218 | 0372 | 82.1 |
| Liebster Jesu, wir sind hier | 3498b | 373 | 228 | 131 | 131 | 0373 | 133.1 |
| Liebster Jesu, wir sind hier | 3498b | 373 | 228 | 327 | 328 | 0373 | 133.1 |
| Lobet den Herren, denn er ist sehr ... | 975 | 374 | 232 | 227 | 227 | 0374 | 135.1 |
| Lobt Gott, ihr Christen, allzugleich | 198 | 375 | 233 | 276 | 276 | 0375 | 127.1b |
| Lobt Gott, ihr Christen, allzugleich | 198 | 376 | 234 | 341 | 342 | 0376 | 127.2 |
| Machs mit mir, Gott, nach deiner Güt | 2383 | 377 | 237 | 44 | 44 | 0377 | 137.1 |
| Mein Augen schließ ich jetzt | 1067 | 378 | 240 | 258 | 258 | 0378 | 138.1 |
| Meinen Jesum laß ich nicht, Jesus ... | 3448a | 379 | 241 | 151 | 151 | 0379 | 122.1 |
| Meinen Jesum laß ich nicht, weil ... | 3449 | 380 | 242 | 298 | 299 | 0380 | 141.1b |
| Meines Lebens letzte Zeit | 6380 | 381 | 248 | 345 | 346 | 0381 | 142.1 |
| Mit Fried und Freud ich fahr dahin | 3986 | 382 | 249 | 49 | 49 | 0382 | 144.1 |
| Mitten wir im Leben sind | 8502 | 383 | 252 | 214 | 214 | 0383 | 145.1 |
| Nicht so traurig, nicht so sehr | 3355 | 384 | 253 | 149 | 149 | 0384 | 146.1 |
| Nun bitten wir den Heiligen Geist | 2029 | 385 | 254 | 36 | 36 | 0385 | 147.1 |
| Nun danket alle Gott | 5142 | 386 | 257 | 32 | 32 | 0386; Leuthen Chorale | 148.1 |
| Nun freut euch, Gottes Kinder all | 364 | 387 | 260 | 185 | 185 | 0387 | 106.1 |
| Nun freut euch, lieben Christen g'mein | 4427 | 388 | 261 | 183 | 183 | 0388 | 149.1 |
| Nun lob, mein Seel, den Herren | 8244 | 389 | 269 | 268 | 268 | 0389 | 153.1 |
| Nun lob, mein Seel, den Herren | 8244 | 390 | 270 | 295 | 296 | 0390 | 153.2 |
| Nun preiset alle Gottes Barmherzigkeit | 4089a | 391 | 273 | 222 | 222 | 0391 | 154.1 |
| Nun ruhen alle Wälder | 2293b | 392 | 298 | 288 | 289 | 0392; ≈BWV 97/9 | 166.9c |
| O Welt, sieh hier dein Leben | 2293b | 393 | 289 | 275 | 275 | 0393 | 166.1a/b |
| O Welt, sieh hier dein Leben | 2293b | 394 | 290 | 365 | 366 | 0394 | 166.2 |
| O Welt, sieh hier dein Leben | 2293b | 395 | 291 | 362 | 363 | 0395 | 166.5c |
| Nun sich der Tag geendet hat | 212b | 396 | 274 | 240 | 240 | 0396 | 155.1 |
| O Ewigkeit, du Donnerwort | 5820 | 397 | 275 | 274 | 274 | 0397; ≈BWV 513: Notebook AMB II No. 42 | 156.1 |
| O Gott, du frommer Gott | 5206b | 398 | 277 | 311 | 312 | 0398; ≈BWV 197a/7 | 45.2b |
| O Gott, du frommer Gott | 5148 | 399 | 282 | 314 | 315 | 0399 | 157.1 |
| O Herzensangst, o Bangigkeit | 1003 | 400 | 284 | 173 | 173 | 0400 | 160.1 |
| O Lamm Gottes, unschuldig | 4361a | 401 | 285 | 165 | 165 | 0401 | 162.1 |
| O Mensch, bewein dein Sünde groß | 8303 | 402 | 286 | 201 | 201 | 0402 | 61.1 |
| O Mensch, bewein dein Sünde groß | 8303 | 402 | 286 | 305 | 306 | 0402 | 61.1 |
| O Mensch, schau Jesum Christum an | 3994c | 403 | 287 | 203 | 203 | 0403 | 163.1 |
| O Traurigkeit, o Herzeleid | 1915 | 404 | 288 | 60 | 57 | 0404 | 165.1b |
| O wie selig seid ihr doch, ihr Frommen | 1583 | 405 | 299 | 213 | 213 | 0405; ≈BWV 495: Schemelli No. 894 (65) | 167.1 |
| O wie selig seid ihr doch, ihr Frommen | 1581 | 406 | 300 | 219 | 219 | 0406 | 7.1 |
| O wir armen Sünder | 8187h | 407 | 301 | 202 | 202 | 0407 | 168.1 |
| Schaut, ihr Sünder | 8569(B) | 408 | 303 | 171 | 171 | 0408 | 94.1B |
| Seelenbräutigam | 3255b | 409 | 306 | 141 | 141 | 0409 | 173.1 |
| Sei gegrüßet, Jesu gütig | 3889b | 410 | 307 | 172 | 172 | 0410; ≈BWV 499: Schemelli No. 293 (22) | 174.1 |
| Singt dem Herrn ein neues Lied | 6424 | 411 | 309 | 246 | 246 | 0411 | 175.1 |
| So gibst du nun, mein Jesu, gute Nacht | 849 | 412 | 310 | 206 | 206 | 0412; ≈BWV 501: Schemelli No. 315 (26) | 177.1 |
| Sollt ich meinem Gott nicht singen | 7886b | 413 | 311 | 220 | 220 | 0413; ≈BWV 481: Schemelli No. 281 (18) | 130.1 |
| Uns ist ein Kindlein heut geborn | 493 | 414 | 313 | 148 | 148 | 0414; ≈BWV 253 | 35.2 |
| Valet will ich dir geben | 5404a | 415 | 314 | 24 | 24 | 0415 | 180.1 |
| Vater unser im Himmelreich | 2561 | 416 | 316 | 47 | 47 | 0416; =BWV 245/5 (first version) | 181.4a |
| Von Gott will ich nicht lassen | 5264b | 417 | 324 | 363 | 364 | 0417 | 185.1 |
| Von Gott will ich nicht lassen | 5264b | 418 | 325 | 331 | 332 | 0418 | 185.2 |
| Von Gott will ich nicht lassen | 5264b | 419 | 326 | 114 | 114 | 0419 | 185.3 |
| Warum betrübst du dich, mein Herz | 1689 | 420 | 331 | 145 | 145 | 0420 | 189.2 |
| Warum betrübst du dich, mein Herz | 1689 | 421 | 332 | 299 | 300 | 0421 | 189.1a/b |
| Warum sollt ich mich denn grämen | 6461 | 422 | 334 | 356 | 357 | 0422 | 190.1a/b |
| Was betrübst du dich, mein Herze | 6830 | 423 | 336 | 237 | 237 | 0423 | 191.1 |
| Was bist du doch, o Seele, so betrübet | 1837 | 424 | 337 | 193 | 193 | 0424; ≈BWV 506: Schemelli No. 779 (55) | 192.1 |
| Was willst du dich, o meine Seele, kränken | 7844 | 425 | 349 | 241 | 241 | 0425 | 195.1 |
| Weltlich Ehr und zeitlich Gut | 4975 | 426 | 351 | 211 | 211 | 0426 | 197.1 |
| Wenn ich in Angst und Not | 4233 | 427 | 352 | 147 | 147 | 0427 | 200.1 |
| Wenn mein Stündlein vorhanden ist | 4482a,b | 428 | 353 | 321 | 322 | 0428 | 201.3 |
| Wenn mein Stündlein vorhanden ist | 4482a,b | 429 | 354 | 51 | 52 | 0429 | 201.1 |
| Wenn mein Stündlein vorhanden ist | 4482a,b | 430 | 355 | 350 | 351 | 0430 | 201.2 |
| Wenn wir in höchsten Nöten sein | 394 | 431 | 358 | 68 | 68 | 0431 | 203.1 |
| Wenn wir in höchsten Nöten sein | 394 | 432 | 359 | 247 | 247 | 0432 | 203.2 |
| Wer Gott vertraut, hat wohl gebaut | 8207b | 433 | 366 | 135 | 137 | 0433 | 204.1 |
| Wer nur den lieben Gott läßt walten | 2778 | 434 | 367 | 146 | 146 | 0434 | 205.1 |
| Wie bist du, Seele, in mir so gar betrübt | 4092 | 435 | 374 | 242 | 242 | 0435 | 207.1 |
| Wie schön leuchtet der Morgenstern | 8359 | 436 | 375 | 278 | 278 | 0436 | 209.1 |
| Wir glauben all an einen Gott, Schöpfer ... | 7971 | 437 | 382 | 133 | 133 | 0437 | 211.1 |
| Wo Gott zum Haus nicht gibt sein Gunst | 305 | 438 | 389 | 157 | 157 | 0438 | 213.1 |
| Other chorale harmonisations | (Zahn) | **441^{*}–deest** | (389) | (CPE) | (Rie.) | (↑ Go to top of table ↑) | (BC F) |
| Auf, auf, mein Herz, mit Freuden | 5243 | 441^{*} | | | | 0441; ≈BWV 441, Schemelli No. 320 (27) | 18.1 |
| Beschränkt, ihr Weisen dieser Welt | 7765 | 443^{*} | | | | ≈BWV 443, Schemelli No. 689 (47) | 265 |
| Brunnquell aller Güter | 6252b | 445^{*} | | | | ≈BWV 445, Schemelli No. 335 (29) | 247 |
| Der Tag mit seinem Lichte | 7512b | 448^{*} | | | | ≈BWV 448, Schemelli No. 43 (4) | 222 |
| Dich bet ich an, mein höchster Gott | 2437 | 449^{*} | | | | ≈BWV 449, Schemelli No. 396 (31) | 249 |
| Ich bin ja, Herr, in deiner Macht | 5869a | 464^{*} | | | | ≈BWV 464, Schemelli No. 861 (58) | 276 |
| Jesu, deine Liebeswunden | 1302 | 471^{*} | | | | ≈BWV 471, Schemelli No. 139 (10) | 228 |
| Kommt, Seelen, dieser Tag | 5185 | 479^{*} | | | | ≈BWV 479, Schemelli No. 936 (67) | 285 |
| Kommt wieder aus der finstern ... | 4709 | 480^{*} | | | | ≈BWV 480, Schemelli No. 938 (68) | 286 |
| Mein Jesu! was vor Seelenweh | 8383 | 487^{*} | | | | ≈BWV 487, Schemelli No. 283 (19) | 237 |
| Selig, wer an Jesum denkt | 4846 | 498^{*} | | | | ≈BWV 498, Schemelli No. 292 (21) | 239 |
| So gehst du nun, mein Jesu, hin | 7631b | 500^{*} | | | | ≈BWV 500, Schemelli No. 296 (23) | 241 |
| So gehst du nun, mein Jesu, hin (1 v.) | 7631b | 500a | | | | 0500a; Fr. St Mark Pass. past.; ≈BWV 500 | 241 |
| Steh ich bei meinem Gott | 5207 | 503^{*} | | | | ≈BWV 503, Schemelli No. 945 (69) | 287 |
| Christus, der uns selig macht (1 v.) | 6283b | 1084 | | | | 1084; From St Mark Passion pasticcio | (D 5b/6) |
| Da Jesus an dem Kreuze stund | 1706 | 1089 | | | | 1089 | 109.1 |
| Denket doch, ihr Menschenkinder | | 1122 | | | | 1122 | 41.1 |
| Wo Gott zum Haus nicht gibt sein Gunst | 305 | 1123 | | | | 1123 | 213.2 |
| Ich ruf zu dir, Herr Jesu Christ | 7400 | 1124 | | | | 1124 | 103.1 |
| O Gott, du frommer Gott | 5206b | 1125 | | | | 1125 | 45.1 |
| Lobet Gott, unsern Herren | 5393 | 1126 | | | | 1126 | 136.1 |
| Welt, ade! Ich bin dein müde (v. 1) | 6531 | Anh. 170 | 350 | 150 | 150 | 0027_6; =BWV 27/6; SSATB; Spurious | 196; — |
| O Traurigkeit, o Herzeleid (1 v.) | 1915 | deest | | | | deest; From St Mark Passion pasticcio | — |
| Welt, tobe wie du willst | — | deest | | | | | 198.1 |

=== In larger vocal works ===
More than 200 of Bach's over 400 homophonic chorale harmonisations survived in his larger vocal works.

==== In church cantatas ====
Four-part chorales also appearing as cantata movements composed by Johann Sebastian Bach (verse incipits, and their translations by Pamela Dellal, from the Emmanuel Music website unless otherwise indicated): BWV 1/6: "Wie bin ich doch so herzlich froh" ("How happy I am", v. 7 of "Wie schön leuchtet der Morgenstern") • 2/6: "Das wollst du, Gott, bewahren rein" ("This, God, you would keep pure", v. 6 of Ach Gott, vom Himmel sieh darein") • 3/6: "Erhalt mein Herz im Glauben rein" ("If my heart remains pure in faith", v. 18 of "Ach Gott, wie manches Herzeleid") • 4/8 • 5/7 • 6/6 • 7/7 • 9/7 • 10/7 • 12/7 • 13/6 • 14/5 • 16/6 • 17/7 • 18/5 • 19/7 • 20/7=/11 • 22/5 • 24/6 • 25/6 • 26/6 • 28/6 • 29/8 • 30/6 • 31/9 • 32/6 • 33/6 • 36/4 and /8 • 37/6 • 38/6 • 39/7 • 40/3, /6 and /8 • 41/6 • 42/7 • 44/7 • 45/7 • 46/6 • 47/5 • 48/3 and /7 • 52/6 • 55/5 • 56/5 • 57/8 • 59/3 • 60/5 • 62/6 64. • 64/2, /4 and /8 • 65/2 and /7 • 66/6 • 67/4 and /7 • 69/6 • 69a/6 • 70/7 and /11 • 72/6 • 73/5 • 74/8 • 75/7=/14 • 76/7=/14 • 77/6 • 78/7 79. • 79/3 and /6 • 80/8 • 81/7 • 83/5 • 84/5 • 85/6 • 86/6 • 87/7 • 88/7 • 89/6 • 90/5 • 91/6 • 92/9 • 93/7 • 94/8 • 95/1 (extract: 282) and /7 • 96/6 • 97/9 • 99/6 • 100/6 • 101/7 • 102/7 • 103/6 • 104/6 • 105/6 • 107/7 • 108/6 • 110/7 • 111/6 • 112/5 • 113/1 and /8 • 114/7 • 115/6 • 116/6 • 117/4=/9 • 119/9 • 120/6 • 120a/8 • 121/6 • 122/6 • 123/6 • 124/6 • 125/6 • 126/6 • 127/5 • 128/5 • 129/5 • 130/6 • 133/6 • 135/6 • 136/6 • 137/5 • 139/6 • 140/7 • 144/3 and /6 • 145/a and /5 • 146/8 • 147/6=/10 • 148/6 • 149/7 • 151/5 153. • 153/1, /5 and /9 • 154/3 and /8 • 155/5 • 156/6 • 157/5 • 158/4 • 159/5 • 161/6 • 162/6 • 164/6 • 165/6 • 166/6 • 167/5 • 168/6 • 169/7 • 171/6 • 172/6 • 174/5 • 175/7 • 176/6 • 177/5 • 178/7 • 179/6 • 180/7 • 183/5 • 184/5 • 185/6 • 187/7 • 188/6 • 190/7 • 194/6 and /12 • 195/6 • 197/5 and /10 • 197a/7 (≈398)

Spurious chorale harmonisations in Bach's autographs: BWV 8/6 • 27/6 (=Anh. 170) • 43/11

Chorale harmonisations from spurious or doubtful cantatas (or: cantata versions) in the Richter/Kalmus collection of 389 chorale harmonisations: No. 130: BWV Anh. 31: "Herr Gott, dich loben alle wir" from a doubtful version of BWV 130 • No. 219: BWV 218/5 = TWV 1:634/5: "Komm, Gott Schöpfer, Heiliger Geist", by Telemann • No. 387: BWV 219/5 = TWV 1:1328/5: "Wo Gott der Herr nicht bei uns hält", by Telemann

==== In motets ====
Chorale harmonisations appearing in Bach's motets: BWV 226/2 • 227/1=/11, /3 (SSATB) and /7 • 229/2

==== In Passions ====
===== In St Matthew Passion =====
Four-part chorales appearing in the St Matthew Passion: BWV 244/3, /10, /15≈/17, /25, /32, /37, /40, /44, /46, /54 and /62 • 244b/29

===== In St John Passion =====
Four-part chorales appearing in the St John Passion: BWV 245/3, /5 (=BWV 416), /11, /14, /15, /17, /22, /26, /28, /37 and /40

===== In St Mark Passion pasticcio =====
For his own performances of the Jesus Christus ist um unsrer Missetat willen verwundet Passion Bach composed and/or reworked a few of its chorales: No. 9b: "So gehst du nun, mein Jesu" (BWV 500a) • No. 14: "O hilf Christe, Gottes Sohn" (BWV 1084) • No. 29: "O Traurigkeit, o Herzeleid" (BWV deest)

==== In oratorios ====
===== Ascension Oratorio =====
Four-part chorale appearing in the Ascension Oratorio: BWV 11/6

===== Christmas Oratorio =====
Four-part chorales in Bach's Christmas Oratorio, BWV 248: Part I/5 and /9 • II/3, /8 and /14 • III/5, /10 and /12 • IV/7 • V/4 and /11 • VI/6 and /11

=== In chorale collections ===
Somewhat less than 200 of Bach's chorale harmonisations only survived in early collections containing multiple, usually short, works.

==== Three Wedding Chorales, BWV 250–252 ====
Three wedding chorales grouped in an autograph manuscript by Bach:
1. BWV 250: "Was Gott tut, das ist wohlgetan"
2. BWV 251: "Sei Lob und Ehr dem höchsten Gut"
3. BWV 252: "Nun danket alle Gott"

==== 186 four-part chorales in BGA Vol. 39, BWV 253–438 ====
The Bach Gesellschaft published 185 four-part chorales in the 39th volume of its complete Bach-edition. The BWV 253–438 range, which, in its original collation, was based on the BGA publication does however contain 186 chorales. The difference is that BWV 279, (near-)identical to BWV 158/4, was not retained in the BGA set:

- BGA No. 26 → "Christ lag in Todesbanden", BWV 278
- not in BGA Vol. 39: "Christ lag in Todesbanden", BWV 279 (≈BWV 158/4, in BGA Vol. 32)
- BGA No. 27 → "Christ unser Herr zum Jordan kam", BWV 280

Legend to the table
| column | | content |
|---|---|---|
| 1 | BWV | Bach-Werke-Verzeichnis (lit. 'Bach-works-catalogue'; BWV) numbers. Anhang (Annex; Anh.) numbers are indicated as follows: preceded by I: in Anh. I (lost works) of BWV^{1} (1950 first edition of the BWV); preceded by II: in Anh. II (doubtful works) of BWV^{1}; preceded by III: in Anh. III (spurious works) of BWV^{1}; preceded by N: new Anh. numbers in BWV^{2} (1990) and/or BWV^{2a} (1998) |
| 2 | ^{2a} | Section in which the composition appears in BWV^{2a}: Chapters of the main catalogue indicated by Arabic numerals (1-13); Anh. sections indicated by Roman numerals (I–III); Reconstructions published in the NBE indicated by "R" |
| 3 | Date | Date associated with the completion of the listed version of the composition. Exact dates (e.g. for most cantatas) usually indicate the assumed date of first (public) performance. When the date is followed by an abbreviation in brackets (e.g. JSB for Johann Sebastian Bach) it indicates the date of that person's involvement with the composition as composer, scribe or publisher. |
| 4 | Name | Name of the composition: if the composition is known by a German incipit, that German name is preceded by the composition type (e.g. cantata, chorale prelude, motet, ...) |
| 5 | Key | Key of the composition |
| 6 | Scoring | See scoring table below for the abbreviations used in this column |
| 7 | BG | Bach Gesellschaft-Ausgabe (BG edition; BGA): numbers before the colon indicate the volume in that edition. After the colon an Arabic numeral indicates the page number where the score of the composition begins, while a Roman numeral indicates a description of the composition in the Vorwort (Preface) of the volume. |
| 8 | NBE | New Bach Edition (German: Neue Bach-Ausgabe, NBA): Roman numerals for the series, followed by a slash, and the volume number in Arabic numerals. A page number, after a colon, refers to the "Score" part of the volume. Without such page number, the composition is only described in the "Critical Commentary" part of the volume. The volumes group Bach's compositions by genre: 1. Cantatas (Vol. 1–34: church cantatas grouped by occasion; Vol. 35–40: secular cantatas; Vol. 41: Varia); 2. Masses, Passions, Oratorios (12 volumes); 3. Motets, Chorales, Lieder (4 volumes); 4. Organ Works (11 volumes); 5. Keyboard and Lute Works (14 volumes); 6. Chamber Music (5 volumes); 7. Orchestral Works (7 volumes); 8. Canons, Musical Offering, Art of Fugue (3 volumes); 9. Addenda (approximately 7 volumes) |
| 9 | Additional info | may include: "after" – indicating a model for the composition; "by" – indicating the composer of the composition (if different from Johann Sebastian Bach); "in" – indicating the oldest known source for the composition; "pasticcio" – indicating a composition with parts of different origin; "see" – composition renumbered in a later edition of the BWV; "text" – by text author, or, in source; Provenance of standard texts and tunes, such as Lutheran hymns and their chorale melodies, Latin liturgical texts (e.g. Magnificat) and common tunes (e.g. Folia), are not usually indicated in this column. For an overview of such resources used by Bach, see individual composition articles, and overviews in, e.g., Chorale cantata (Bach)#Bach's chorale cantatas, List of chorale harmonisations by Johann Sebastian Bach#Chorale harmonisations in various collections and List of organ compositions by Johann Sebastian Bach#Chorale Preludes. |
| 10 | BD | Bach Digital Work page |

Legend for abbreviations in "Scoring" column
Voices (see also SATB)
| a | A | b | B | s | S | t | T | v | | | V | |
|---|---|---|---|---|---|---|---|---|---|---|---|---|
| alto (solo part) | alto (choir part) | bass (solo part) | bass (choir part) | soprano (solo part) | soprano (choir part) | tenor (solo part) | tenor (choir part) | voice (includes parts for unspecified voices or instruments as in some canons) | | | vocal music for unspecified voice type | |
Winds and battery (bold = soloist)
| Bas | Bel | Cnt | Fl | Hn | Ob | Oba | Odc | Tai | Tbn | Tdt | Tmp | Tr |
| bassoon (can be part of Bc, see below) | bell(s) (musical bells) | cornett, cornettino | flute (traverso, flauto dolce, piccolo, flauto basso) | natural horn, corno da caccia, corno da tirarsi, lituo | oboe | oboe d'amore | oboe da caccia | taille | trombone | tromba da tirarsi | timpani | tromba (natural trumpet, clarino trumpet) |
Strings and keyboard (bold = soloist)
| Bc | | Hc | Kb | Lu | Lw | Org | Str | Va | Vc | Vdg | Vl | Vne |
| basso continuo: Vdg, Hc, Vc, Bas, Org, Vne and/or Lu | | harpsichord | keyboard (Hc, Lw, Org or clavichord) | lute, theorbo | Lautenwerck (lute-harpsichord) | organ (/man. = manualiter, without pedals) | strings: Vl I, Vl II and Va | viola(s), viola d'amore, violetta | violoncello, violoncello piccolo | viola da gamba | violin(s), violino piccolo | violone, violone grosso |

186 four-part chorales in BGA Vol. 39, BWV 253–438
| BWV | ^{2a} | Date | Name | Key | Scoring | BG | NBE | Additional info | BD |
|---|---|---|---|---|---|---|---|---|---|
| 253 | 5. | 1750 or earlier | chorale setting "Ach bleib bei uns, Herr Jesu Christ" | A maj. | SATB | 39: 177 | III/2.2: 101 | after Z 439; text by Calvisius; ↔ BWV 414 | 00323 |
| 254 | 5. | 1750 or earlier | chorale setting "Ach Gott, erhör mein Seufzen" | D Dor. | SATB | 39: 177 | III/2.2: 105 | after Z 1831a; text by Schechs | 00324 |
| 255 | 5. | 1750 or earlier | chorale setting "Ach Gott und Herr" | C maj. | SATB | 39: 178 | III/2.2: 24 | after Z 4441a; text by Rutilius | 00325 |
| 256 | 5. | 1750 or earlier | chorale setting "Ach lieben Christen, seid getrost" | A min. | SATB | 39: 178 | III/2.2: 19 | after Z 4441a; text by Gigas | 00326 |
| 259 | 5. | 1750 or earlier | chorale setting "Ach, was soll ich Sünder machen" | E min. | SATB | 39: 179 | III/2.2: 23 | after Z 3573b; text by Flittner | 00329 |
| 260 | 5. | c. 1735 or earlier | chorale setting "Allein Gott in der Höh sei Ehr" | G maj. | SATB | 39: 180 | III/2.1: 9 III/2.2: 147 | after Z 4457; text by Decius after Gloria | 00330 |
| 261 | 5. | 1750 or earlier | chorale setting "Allein zu dir, Herr Jesu Christ" | B min. | SATB | 39: 180 | III/2.2: 206 | after Z 7292b; text by Hubert | 00331 |
| 262 | 5. | 1750 or earlier | chorale setting "Alle Menschen müssen sterben" | D maj. | SATB | 39: 181 | III/2.2: 88 | after Pachelbel; text by Albinus, Rosenmüller | 00332 |
| 263 | 5. | 1750 or earlier | chorale setting "Alles ist an Gottes Segen" | G maj. | SATB | 39: 181 | III/2.2: 72 | after Z 3842f | 00333 |
| 264 | 5. | 1750 or earlier | chorale setting "Als der gütige Gott" | G maj. | SATB | 39: 182 | III/2.2: 91 | after Z 1646; text by Weiße | 00334 |
| 265 | 5. | 1750 or earlier | chorale setting "Als Jesus Christus in der Nacht" | D Dor. | SATB | 39: 182 | III/2.2: 102 | after Z 258; text by Heermann | 00335 |
| 266 | 5. | 1750 or earlier | chorale setting "Als vierzig Tag nach Ostern warn" | E min. | SATB | 39: 182 | III/2.2: 120 | after Z 1743; text by Herman | 00336 |
| 267 | 5. | c. 1735 or earlier | chorale setting "An Wasserflüssen Babylon" | G maj. | SATB | 39: 183 | III/2.2: 4 | after Z 7663; text by Dachstein | 00337 |
| 267 | 5. | c. 1735 or earlier | chorale setting "An Wasserflüssen Babylon" | A♭ Maj. | SATB | | III/2.1: 98 | after Z 7663; text by Dachstein | 00337 |
| 267 | 5. | c. 1735 or earlier | chorale setting "Ein Lämmlein geht und trägt | G maj. | SATB | 39: 183 | | after Z 7663; text by Gerhardt | 00337 |
| 267 | 5. | c. 1735 or earlier | chorale setting "Ein Lämmlein geht und trägt | A♭ Maj. | SATB | | III/2.2: 180 | after Z 7663; text by Gerhardt | 00337 |
| 268 | 5. | 1750 or earlier | chorale setting "Auf, auf, mein Herz" | G maj. | SATB | 39: 184 | III/2.2: 70 | after Z 824; text by Birken | 00338 |
| 269 | 5. | 1750 or earlier | chorale setting "Aus meines Herzens Grunde" | G maj. | SATB | 39: 184 | III/2.2: 2 | after Z 5269; text by Niege | 00339 |
| 270 | 5. | c. 1735 or earlier | chorale setting "Befiehl du deine Wege" | B min. | SATB | 39: 185 | III/2.1: 47; III/2.2: 170 | after Z 5385a; text by Gerhardt | 00340 |
| 271 | 5. | c. 1735 or earlier | chorale setting "Befiehl du deine Wege" | B min. | SATB | 39: 185 | III/2.1: 97; III/2.2: 210 | after Z 5385a; text by Gerhardt | 00341 |
| 272 | 5. | 1730–1761 | chorale setting "Befiehl du deine Wege" | D min. | SATB | 39: 186 | III/2.2: 196 | by Bach, C. P. E.?; after Z 5393; text by Gerhardt | 00342 |
| 273 | 5. | 1750 or earlier | chorale setting "Christ, der du bist der helle Tag" | G min. | SATB | 39: 186 | III/2.2: 136 | after Z 384; text by Alberus | 00343 |
| 274 | 5. | 1750 or earlier | chorale setting "Christe, der du bist Tag und Licht" | G min. | SATB | 39: 187 | III/2.2: 145 | after Z 343; text by Musculus after "Christe qui lux es" | 00344 |
| 275 | 5. | 1750 or earlier | chorale setting "Christe, du Beistand" | D Dor. | SATB | 39: 187 | III/2.2: 122 | after Z 993; text by Löwenstern | 00345 |
| 276 | 5. | 1750 or earlier | chorale setting "Christ ist erstanden" | D Dor. | SATB | 39: 188 | III/2.2: 110 | after Z 8584; text: "Christ ist erstanden" | 00346 |
| 277 | 5. | 1750 or earlier | chorale setting "Christ lag in Todesbanden" | D Dor. | SATB | 39: 189 | III/2.2: 11 | after Z 7012a; text by Luther | 00347 |
| 278 | 5. | c. 1735 or earlier | chorale setting "Christ lag in Todesbanden" | E min. | SATB | 39: 190 | III/2.1: 92; III/2.2: 212 | after Z 7012a; text by Luther | 00348 |
| 279 | 5. | c. 1725–1735 | chorale setting "Christ lag in Todesbanden" | E min. | SATB | 32: 154 | III/2.1: 24; III/2.2: 155 | after Z 7012a; text by Luther; ↔ BWV 158/4 | 00349 |
| 280 | 5. | 1750 or earlier | chorale setting "Christ unser Herr zum Jordan kam" | D Dor. | SATB | 39: 190 | III/2.2: 36 | after Z 7246; text by Luther | 00350 |
| 281 | 5. | 1750 or earlier | chorale setting "Christus, der ist mein Leben" | F maj. | SATB | 39: 191 | III/2.2: 6 | after Z 132, Neu Leipziger GB, p 942 | 00351 |
| 282 | 5. | 1750 or earlier | chorale setting "Christus, der ist mein Leben" | G maj. | SATB | 39: 191 | III/2.2: 184 | after BWV 95/1 | 00352 |
| 283 | 5. | 1750 or earlier | chorale setting "Christus, der uns selig macht" | A min. | SATB | 39: 192 | III/2.2: 112 | after Z 6283a; text by Weiße after "Patris sapientia" | 00353 |
| 284 | 5. | 1750 or earlier | chorale setting "Christus ist erstanden, hat überwunden" | C maj. | SATB | 39: 192 | III/2.2: 113 | after Z 6240b; text by Weiße | 00354 |
| 285 | 5. | 1750 or earlier | chorale setting "Da der Herr Christ zu Tische saß" | C min. | SATB | 39: 193 | III/2.2: 110 | after Z 2503; text by Herman | 00355 |
| 286 | 5. | 1750 or earlier | chorale setting "Danket dem Herrn, denn er ist" | A min. | SATB | 39: 193 | III/2.2: 134 | after Z 12; text by Horn | 00356 |
| 287 | 5. | 1750 or earlier | chorale setting "Dank sei Gott in der Höhe" | F maj. | SATB | 39: 194 | III/2.2: 182 | after Z 5391; text by Mühlmann | 00357 |
| 288 | 5. | c. 1735 or earlier | chorale setting "Das alte Jahr vergangen ist" | D Dor. | SATB | 39: 194 | III/2.1: 11; III/2.2: 93 | after Z 381; text by Steuerlein | 00358 |
| 289 | 5. | 1750 or earlier | chorale setting "Das alte Jahr vergangen ist" | E min. | SATB | 39: 194 | III/2.2: 183 | after Z 381; text by Steuerlein | 00359 |
| 290 | 5. | 1750 or earlier | chorale setting "Das walt Gott Vater und Gott Sohn" | F maj. | SATB | 39: 195 | III/2.2: 132 | after Z 673; text by Behm | 00360 |
| 291 | 5. | 1750 or earlier | chorale setting "Das walt mein Gott" | D min. | SATB | 39: 195 | III/2.2: 42 | after Z 4217; text by Förtsch? | 00361 |
| 292 | 5. | 1750 or earlier | chorale setting "Den Vater dort oben" | C maj. | SATB | 39: 196 | III/2.2: 141 | after Z 4795; text by Weiße | 00362 |
| 293 | 5. | 1750 or earlier | chorale setting "Der du bist drei in Einigkeit" | D Dor. | SATB | 39: 196 | III/2.2: 89 | after Z 335e; text by Luther after "O lux beata Trinitas" | 00363 |
| 294 | 5. | 1750 or earlier | chorale setting "Der Tag, der ist so freudenreich" | G maj. | SATB | 39: 197 | III/2.2: 90 | after Z 7870; text after "Dies est laetitiae" | 00364 |
| 295 | 5. | 1750 or earlier | chorale setting "Des Heilgen Geistes reiche Gnad" | D min. | SATB | 39: 197 | III/2.2: 120 | after Z 370b; text by Gesius after "Spiritus Sancti gratia" | 00365 |
| 296 | 5. | 1750 or earlier | chorale setting "Die Nacht ist kommen" | G Mix. | SATB | 39: 198 | III/2.2: 136 | after Z 5001; text by Herbert | 00366 |
| 297 | 5. | 1750 or earlier | chorale setting "Die Sonn hat sich mit ihrem Glanz gewendet" | D Dor. | SATB | 39: 198 | III/2.2: 137 | after Z 923; text by Stegmann; ↔ BWV 447 | 00367 |
| 298 | 5. | 1750 or earlier | chorale setting "Dies sind die heilgen zehn Gebot" | C maj. | SATB | 39: 198 | III/2.2: 72 | after Z 1951; text by Luther | 00368 |
| 299 [2] | 5. | 1725–1735 | chorale setting "Dir, dir, Jehova, will ich singen" | B♭ maj. | SATB | 39: 199 | III/2.1: 11; III/2.2: 121 | ↔ Z 3068; text by Crasselius; → BWV 452 | 00369 |
| 299 [1] | 5. | 1725–1735 | Notebook A. M. Bach (1725) No. 39: chorale setting "Dir, dir, Jehova, will ich singen" | B♭ maj. | S(AT)B (V Bc) | 43^{2}: 50 | V/4: 126 | ↔ Z 3068; text by Crasselius; → BWV 452 | 11543 |
| 300 | 5. | 1750 or earlier | chorale setting "Du großer Schmerzensmann" | E min. | SATB | 39: 199 | III/2.2: 94 | after Z 5159a; text by Thebesius | 00370 |
| 301 | 5. | 1750 or earlier | chorale setting "Du, o schönes Weltgebäude" | D min. | SATB | 39: 200 | III/2.2: 80 | after Z 6773; text by Franck, J. | 00371 |
| 302 | 5. | c. 1735 or earlier | chorale setting "Ein feste Burg ist unser Gott" | D maj. | SATB | 39: 200 | III/2.1: 48; III/2.2: 14 | after Z 7377; text by Luther after Ps. 46 | 00372 |
| 303 | 5. | c. 1735 or earlier | chorale setting "Ein feste Burg ist unser Gott" | D maj. | SATB | 39: 201 | III/2.1: 10; III/2.2: 148 | after Z 7377; text by Luther after Ps. 46 | 00373 |
| 304 | 5. | c. 1735 or earlier | chorale setting "Eins ist not, ach Herr, dies Eine" | D maj. | SATB | 39: 201 | III/2.1: 36; III/2.2: 166 | after Z 7127; text by Schröder | 00374 |
| 305 | 5. | 1750 or earlier | chorale setting "Erbarm dich mein, o Herre Gott" | A min. | SATB | 39: 202 | III/2.2: 20 | after Z 5851; text by Hegenwald after Ps. 51 | 00375 |
| 306 | 5. | 1750 or earlier | chorale setting "Erstanden ist der heilig Christ" | F maj. | SATB | 39: 202 | III/2.2: 100 | after Z 288; text after "Surrexit Christus hodie" | 00376 |
| 307 | 5. | c. 1735 or earlier | chorale setting "Es ist gewisslich an der Zeit" | B♭ maj. | SATB | 39: 203 | III/2.1: 22; III/2.2: 155 | after Z 4429a; text by Ringwaldt | 00377 |
| 308 | 5. | 1750 or earlier | chorale setting "Es spricht der Unweisen Mund wohl" | B♭ maj. | SATB | 39: 204 | III/2.2: 17 | after Z 4436; text by Luther after Ps. 14 | 00378 |
| 309 | 5. | 1750 or earlier | chorale setting "Es stehn vor Gottes Throne" | G Dor. | SATB | 39: 204 | III/2.2: 95 | after Z 4298; text by Helmbold | 00379 |
| 310 | 5. | 1750 or earlier | chorale setting "Es wird schier der letzte Tag herkommen" | E min. | SATB | 39: 205 | III/2.2: 140 | after Z 1423; text by Weiße | 00380 |
| 311 | 5. | 1750 or earlier | chorale setting "Es woll uns Gott gnädig sein" | B min. | SATB | 39: 205 | III/2.2: 12 | after Z 7247; text by Luther after Ps. 67 | 00381 |
| 312 | 5. | c. 1735 or earlier | chorale setting "Es woll uns Gott gnädig sein" | A min. | SATB | 39: 206 | III/2.1: 70; III/2.2: 202 | after Z 7247; text by Luther after Ps. 67 | 00382 |
| 327 | 5. | 1750 or earlier | chorale setting "Vor deinen Thron tret ich hiermit" | D maj. | SATB | 39: 213 | III/2.2: 193 | after Z 368; text by Hodenberg? | 00397 |
| 313 | 5. | 1750 or earlier | chorale setting "Für Freuden lasst uns springen" | G min. | SATB | 39: 206 | III/2.2: 93 | after Z 2339; text by Peltsch | 00383 |
| 314 | 5. | c. 1735 or earlier | chorale setting "Gelobt seist du, Jesu Christ" | D maj. | SATB | 39: 207 | III/2.1: 48; III/2.2: 171 | after Z 1947; text by Luther | 00384 |
| 315 | 5. | c. 1735 or earlier | chorale setting "Gib dich zufrieden und sei stille" | E min. | SATB | 39: 207 | III/2.1: 38; III/2.2: 161 | after BWV 511; text by Gerhardt; ↔ BWV 512, Z 7417a | 00385 |
| 316 | 5. | 1750 or earlier | chorale setting "Gott, der du selber bist das Licht" | G min. | SATB | 39: 208 | III/2.2: 133 | after Z 5814; text by Rist | 00386 |
| 317 | 5. | 1750 or earlier | chorale setting "Gott der Vater wohn uns bei" | D maj. | SATB | 39: 208 | III/2.2: 78 | after Z 8507; text by Luther | 00387 |
| 318 | 5. | 1750 or earlier | chorale setting "Gottes Sohn ist kommen" | G maj. | SATB | 39: 209 | III/2.2: 13 | after Z 3294; text by Horn | 00388 |
| 318 | 5. | 1750 or earlier | chorale setting "Gottes Sohn ist kommen" | F maj. | SATB | | III/2.2: 214 | after Z 3294; text by Horn | 00388 |
| 319 | 5. | 1750 or earlier | chorale setting "Gott hat das Evangelium" | E min. | SATB | 39: 209 | III/2.2: 102 | after Z 1788; text by Alberus | 00389 |
| 320 | 5. | 1750 or earlier | chorale setting "Gott lebet noch" | F maj. | SATB | 39: 210 | III/2.2: 138 | after Z 7951; text by Zihn; ↔ BWV 461 | 00390 |
| 321 | 5. | 1750 or earlier | chorale setting "Gottlob, es geht nunmehr zum Ende" | B♭ maj. | SATB | 39: 210 | III/2.2: 108 | after Z 2853; → Z 2855; text by Luther | 00391 |
| 322 | 5. | 1750 or earlier | chorale setting "Gott sei gelobet und gebenedeiet" | C maj. | SATB | 39: 211 | III/2.2: 39 | after Z 8078; text by Luther | 00392 |
| 323 | 5. | 1750 or earlier | chorale setting "Gott sei uns gnädig und barmherzig" | F♯ min. | SATB | 39: 212 | III/2.2: 186 | after German Magnificat; text after Ps. 67 | 00393 |
| 325 | 5. | 1750 or earlier | chorale setting "Heilig, heilig, heilig" | F maj. | SATB | 39: 212 | III/2.2: 138 | after Z 8633a; text after Sanctus; ↔ Z 8634 | 00395 |
| 325 | 5. | 1750 or earlier | chorale setting "Sanctus, Sanctus Dominus Deus" | F maj. | SATB | 39: 212 | III/2.2: 138 | after Z 8633a; text: Sanctus; ↔ Z 8634 | 00395 |
| 326 | 5. | 1750 or earlier | chorale setting "Herr Gott, dich loben alle wir" | B♭ maj. | SATB | 39: 213 | III/2.2: 96 | after Z 368; text by Eber | 00396 |
| 328 | 5. | 1750 or earlier | chorale setting "Herr Gott, dich loben wir" | A min. | SATB | 39: 214 | III/2.2: 117 | after Z 8652; text by Luther after Te Deum | 00398 |
| 329 | 5. | 1750 or earlier | chorale setting "Herr, ich denk an jene Zeit" | B♭ maj. | SATB | 39: 216 | III/2.2: 123 | after Z 4840; text by Mylius | 00399 |
| 330 | 5. | 1750 or earlier | chorale setting "Herr, ich habe missgehandelt" | A min. | SATB | 39: 216 | III/2.2: 21 | after Z 3695; text by Franck, J. | 00400 |
| 331 | 5. | c. 1735 or earlier | chorale setting "Herr, ich habe missgehandelt" | A min. | SATB | 39: 217 | III/2.1: 47; III/2.2: 171 | after Z 3695; text by Franck, J. | 00401 |
| 332 | 5. | 1750 or earlier | chorale setting "Herr Jesu Christ, dich zu uns wend" | G maj. | SATB | 39: 217 | III/2.2: 79 | after Z 624; text by William of Saxe-Weimar | 00402 |
| 333 | 5. | 1750 or earlier | chorale setting "Herr Jesu Christ, du hast bereit'" | G min. | SATB | 39: 218 | III/2.2: 133 | after Z 4711; text by Kinner | 00403 |
| 334 | 5. | c. 1735 or earlier | chorale setting "Herr Jesu Christ, ich schrei zu dir" | G min. | SATB | | III/2.1: 43 | after Z 4486 | 00404 |
| 334 | 5. | c. 1735 or earlier | chorale setting "Herr Jesu Christ, du höchstes Gut" | G min. | SATB | 39: 218 | III/2.2: 41 | after Z 4486; text by Ringwaldt | 00404 |
| 335 | 5. | c. 1735 or earlier | chorale setting "Herr Jesu Christ, meins Lebens Licht" | E min. | SATB | 39: 218 | III/2.1: 60; III/2.2: 175 | after Z 423; text by Behm | 00405 |
| 335 | 5. | c. 1735 or earlier | chorale setting "O Jesu, du mein Bräutigam" | E min. | SATB | 39: 218 | III/2.2: 139 | after Z 423; text by Hermann | 00405 |
| 336 | 5. | 1750 or earlier | chorale setting "Herr Jesu Christ, wahr' Mensch und Gott" | A maj. | SATB | 39: 219 | III/2.2: 106 | after Z 423; text by Eber | 00406 |
| 337 | 5. | 1750 or earlier | chorale setting "Herr, nun lass in Friede" | A min. | SATB | 39: 219 | III/2.2: 107 | after Z 3302; text by Behme | 00407 |
| 338 | 5. | 1750 or earlier | chorale setting "Herr, straf mich nicht in deinem Zorn, das bitt" | A min. | SATB | 39: 220 | III/2.2: 131 | after Z 4606a; text after Ps. 6 | 00408 |
| 339 | 5. | 1750 or earlier | chorale setting "Wer in dem Schutz des Höchsten ist" | A maj. | SATB | 39: 220 | III/2.2: 84 | after Z 4438; text by Heyden | 00409 |
| 339 | 5. | 1750 or earlier | chorale setting "Herr, wie du willt, so schicks mit mir" | A maj. | SATB | 39: 220 | III/2.2: 84 | after Z 4438; text by Bienemann | 00409 |
| 340 | 5. | c. 1735 or earlier | chorale setting "Herzlich lieb hab ich dich, o Herr" | C maj. | SATB | 39: 221 | III/2.1: 42; III/2.2: 164 | after Z 8326; text by Schalling | 00410 |
| 341 | 5. | 1750 or earlier | chorale setting "Heut ist, o Mensch, ein großer Trauertag" | G Dor. | SATB | 39: 221 | III/2.2: 96 | after Z 8569/A; text by Löwenstern | 00411 |
| 342 | 5. | 1750 or earlier | chorale setting "Heut triumphieret Gottes Sohn" | A min. | SATB | 39: 222 | III/2.2: 44 | after Z 2585; text by Stolzhagen | 00412 |
| 343 | 5. | 1750 or earlier | chorale setting "Hilf, Gott, dass mirs gelinge" | G Dor. | SATB | 39: 222 | III/2.2: 112 | after Z 4329f; text by Müller, H. | 00413 |
| 344 | 5. | 1750 or earlier | chorale setting "Hilf, Herr Jesu, lass gelingen" | G Dor. | SATB | 39: 223 | III/2.2: 89 | after Z 3687a; text by Rist | 00414 |
| 345 | 5. | c. 1735 or earlier | chorale setting "Ich bin ja, Herr, in deiner Macht" | G min. | SATB | 39: 223 | III/2.1: 13; III/2.2: 148 | ↔ Z 5878a; text by Dach | 00415 |
| 346 | 5. | 1750 or earlier | chorale setting "Ich dank dir, Gott, für deine Wohltat" | C maj. | SATB | 39: 224 | III/2.2: 132 | after Z 8090; text by Freder | 00416 |
| 347 | 5. | 1750 or earlier | chorale setting "Ich dank dir, lieber Herre" | A maj. | SATB | 39: 224 | III/2.2: 2 | after Z 5354a–b; text by Kolross | 00417 |
| 348 | 5. | c. 1735 or earlier | chorale setting "Ich dank dir, lieber Herre" | B♭ maj. | SATB | 39: 225 | III/2.1: 39; III/2.2: 162 | after Z 5354a–b; text by Kolross | 00418 |
| 349 | 5. | 1750 or earlier | chorale setting "Ich dank dir schon durch deinen Sohn" | F maj. | SATB | 39: 225 | III/2.2: 106 | after Z 247b; text by Burchart | 00419 |
| 350 | 5. | 1750 or earlier | chorale setting "Ich danke dir, Herr Gott, in deinem Throne" | G min. | SATB | 39: 226 | III/2.2: 135 | after Z 3199; text by Fabricius | 00420 |
| 351 | 5. | 1750 or earlier | chorale setting "Ich hab mein Sach Gott heimgestellt" | G Dor. | SATB | 39: 226 | III/2.2: 13 | after Z 1679; text by Leon | 00421 |
| 366 | 5. | 1750 or earlier | chorale setting "Ihr Gestirn, ihr hohlen Lüfte" | D min. | SATB | 39: 236 | III/2.2: 92 | after Z 3703; text by Franck, J. | 00436 |
| 367 | 5. | 1750 or earlier | chorale setting "In allen meinen Taten" | C maj. | SATB | 39: 236 | III/2.2: 81 | after Z 2276; text by Fleming | 00437 |
| 368 | 5. | 1750 or earlier | chorale setting "In dulci jubilo" | F maj. | SATB | 39: 236 | III/2.2: 83 | after Z 4947 | 00438 |
| 352 | 5. | 1750 or earlier | chorale setting "Jesu, der du meine Seele" | A min. | SATB | 39: 227 | III/2.2: 22 | after Z 6804; text by Rist | 00422 |
| 353 | 5. | c. 1735 or earlier | chorale setting "Jesu, der du meine Seele" | G min. | SATB | 39: 228 | III/2.1: 26; III/2.2: 160 | after Z 6804; text by Rist | 00423 |
| 354 | 5. | c. 1735 or earlier | chorale setting "Jesu, der du meine Seele" | B♭ Dor. | SATB | 39: 228 | III/2.1: 99; III/2.2: 211 | after Z 6804; text by Rist | 00424 |
| 355 | 5. | 1750 or earlier | chorale setting "Jesu, der du selbsten wohl" | A maj. | SATB | 39: 229 | III/2.2: 97 | after Z 6335; text by Bapzien | 00425 |
| 356 | 5. | 1750 or earlier | chorale setting "Jesu, du mein liebstes Leben" | G min. | SATB | 39: 230 | III/2.2: 144 | after Z 7891; text by Rist | 00426 |
| 357 | 5. | 1750 or earlier | chorale setting "Jesu, Jesu, du bist mein" | C Dor. | SATB | 39: 230 | III/2.2: 144 | ↔ BWV 470, Z 6446 | 00427 |
| 358 | 5. | c. 1735 or earlier | chorale setting "Jesu, meine Freude" | D min. | SATB | 39: 231 | III/2.1: 80; III/2.2: 204 | after Z 8032; text by Franck, J. | 00428 |
| 360 | 5. | c. 1735 or earlier | chorale setting "Jesu, meiner Seelen Wonne" | B♭ maj. | SATB | 39: 232 | III/2.1: 73; III/2.2: 201 | after Z 6551a; text by Janus | 00430 |
| 359 | 5. | 1750 or earlier | chorale setting "Jesu, meiner Seelen Wonne" | A maj. | SATB | 39: 232 | III/2.2: 209 | after BWV 154/3; text by Janus | 00429 |
| 361 | 5. | c. 1735 or earlier | chorale setting "Jesu, meines Herzens Freud" | B♭ maj. | SATB | 39: 233 | III/2.1: 34; III/2.2: 157 | after Z 4797–4798; text by Flittner | 00431 |
| 362 | 5. | c. 1735 or earlier | chorale setting "Jesu, nun sei gepreiset" | B♭ maj. | SATB | 39: 234 | III/2.1: 12; III/2.2: 149 | after Z 8477a; text by Hermann | 00432 |
| 364 | 5. | 1750 or earlier | chorale setting "Jesus Christus, unser Heiland, der den Tod überwand" | G Dor. | SATB | 39: 235 | III/2.2: 99 | after Z 1978; text by Luther | 00434 |
| 363 | 5. | 1750 or earlier | chorale setting "Jesus Christus, unser Heiland, der von uns den Gottes Zorn wandt" | E min. | SATB | 39: 234 | III/2.2: 19 | after Z 1576; text by Luther | 00433 |
| 365 | 5. | 1750 or earlier | chorale setting "Jesus, meine Zuversicht" | C maj. | SATB | 39: 235 | III/2.2: 100 | after Z 3432b; text by Louise Henriette of N | 00435 |
| 369 | 5. | 1750 or earlier | chorale setting "Keinen hat Gott verlassen" | E min. | SATB | 39: 237 | III/2.2: 73 | after Z 5395 | 00439 |
| 370 | 5. | 1750 or earlier | chorale setting "Komm, Gott Schöpfer, Heiliger Geist" | C maj. | SATB | 39: 238 | III/2.2: 105 | after Z 295; text by Luther | 00440 |
| 371 | 5. | 1750 or earlier | chorale setting "Kyrie, Gott Vater in Ewigkeit" | A min. | SATB | 39: 238 | III/2.2: 74 | after Z 8600c | 00441 |
| 372 | 5. | 1750 or earlier | chorale setting "Lass, o Herr, dein Ohr sich neigen" | G Dor. | SATB | 39: 240 | III/2.2: 128 | after Z 6863; text by Opitz | 00442 |
| 373 | 5. | 1750 or earlier | chorale setting "Liebster Jesu, wir sind hier" | G maj. | SATB | 39: 240 | III/2.2: 74, 190 | after Z 3498b; text by Clausnitzer | 00443 |
| 374 | 5. | 1750 or earlier | chorale setting "Lobet den Herren, denn er ist sehr" | G Dor. | SATB | 39: 241 | III/2.2: 134 | after Z 975; text after Ps. 147 | 00444 |
| 375 | 5. | c. 1735 or earlier | chorale setting "Lobt Gott, ihr Christen, allzugleich" | G maj. | SATB | 39: 241 | III/2.1: 45; III/2.2: 164 | after Z 198; text by Herman | 00445 |
| 376 | 5. | 1750 or earlier | chorale setting "Lobt Gott, ihr Christen allzugleich" | A maj. | SATB | 39: 242 | III/2.2: 197 | after Z 198; text by Herman | 00446 |
| 377 | 5. | 1750 or earlier | chorale setting "Machs mit mir, Gott, nach deiner Güt" | D maj. | SATB | 39: 242 | III/2.2: 26 | after Z 2383; text by Schein | 00447 |
| 378 | 5. | 1750 or earlier | chorale setting "Mein Augen schließ ich jetzt" | G maj. | SATB | 39: 243 | III/2.2: 153 | after Z 1067; text by Löwenstern | 00448 |
| 379 | 5. | 1750 or earlier | chorale setting "Meinen Jesum lass ich nicht, Jesus" | G maj. | SATB | 39: 243 | III/2.2: 87 | after Z 3448a | 00449 |
| 380 | 5. | c. 1735 or earlier | chorale setting "Meinen Jesum lass ich nicht, weil" | E♭ maj. | SATB | 39: 244 | III/2.1: 62; III/2.2: 178 | after Z 3449; text by Keymann | 00450 |
| 324 | 5. | 1750 or earlier | chorale setting "Meine Seele erhebet den Herren" | E min. | SATB | 39: 212 | III/2.2: 73 | after German Magnificat; text by Luther after Lk. 1:46–55 | 00394 |
| 381 | 5. | 1750 or earlier | chorale setting "Meines Lebens letzte Zeit" | E min. | SATB | 39: 244 | III/2.2: 199 | after Z 6380; ↔ BWV 488 | 00451 |
| 382 | 5. | c. 1735 or earlier | chorale setting "Mit Fried und Freud ich fahr dahin" | G Dor. | SATB | 39: 245 | III/2.1: 40; III/2.2: 28 | after Z 3986; text by Luther | 00452 |
| 383 | 5. | 1750 or earlier | chorale setting "Mitten wir im Leben sind" | A min. | SATB | 39: 246 | III/2.2: 124 | after Z 8502; text by Luther after Media vita | 00453 |
| 384 | 5. | 1750 or earlier | chorale setting "Nicht so traurig, nicht so sehr" | C min. | SATB | 39: 247 | III/2.2: 86 | ↔ Z 3355; text by Gerhardt | 00454 |
| 385 | 5. | c. 1735 or earlier | chorale setting "Nun bitten wir den Heiligen Geist" | A maj. | SATB | 39: 247 | III/2.1: 76; III/2.2: 22 | after Z 2029a; text by Luther | 00455 |
| 386 | 5. | c. 1735 or earlier | chorale setting "Nun danket alle Gott" | A maj. | SATB | 39: 248 | III/2.1: 101; III/2.2: 20 | after Z 5142; text by Rinkart | 00456 |
| 387 | 5. | 1750 or earlier | chorale setting "Nun freut euch, Gottes Kinder all" | D Dor. | SATB | 39: 248 | III/2.2: 104 | after Z 364; text by Alberus | 00457 |
| 388 | 5. | 1750 or earlier | chorale setting "Nun freut euch, lieben Christen gmein" | G maj. | SATB | 39: 248 | III/2.2: 103 | after Z 4427; text by Luther | 00458 |
| 389 | 5. | c. 1735 or earlier | chorale setting "Nun lob, mein Seel, den Herren" | C maj. | SATB | 39: 249 | III/2.1: 32; III/2.2: 159 | after Z 8244; text by Gramann after Ps. 103 | 00459 |
| 390 | 5. | c. 1735 or earlier | chorale setting "Nun lob, mein Seel, den Herren" | C maj. | SATB | 39: 250 | III/2.1: 58; III/2.2: 176 | after Z 8244; text by Gramann after Ps. 103 | 00460 |
| 391 | 5. | 1750 or earlier | chorale setting "Nun preiset alle Gottes Barmherzigkeit" | G maj. | SATB | 39: 250 | III/2.2: 131 | after Z 4089a; text by Löwenstern | 00461 |
| 392 | 5. | 1734–1750 | chorale setting "Nun ruhen alle Wälder" | B♭ maj. | SATB | 39: 251 | III/2.2: 172 | after BWV 97/9; text by Gerhardt | 00462 |
| 396 | 5. | 1750 or earlier | chorale setting "Nun sich der Tag geendet hat" | A min. | SATB | 39: 252 | III/2.2: 142 | after Z 212b; text by Krieger | 00466 |
| 397 | 5. | c. 1735 or earlier | chorale setting "O Ewigkeit, du Donnerwort" | F maj. | SATB | 39: 253 | III/2.1: 23; III/2.2: 163 | after Z 5820; text by Johann Rist; ↔ BWV 513 | 00467 |
| 398 | 5. | c. 1728–1729 | chorale setting "O Gott, du frommer Gott" | D maj. | SATB | 39: 254 | III/2.2: 182 | after Z 5206b; text by Heermann; ↔ BWV 197a/7 | 00468 |
| 399 | 5. | 1750 or earlier | chorale setting "O Gott, du frommer Gott" | G maj. | SATB | 39: 254 | III/2.2: 184 | after Z 5148; text by Heermann | 00469 |
| 400 | 5. | 1750 or earlier | chorale setting "O Herzensangst" | E♭ maj. | SATB | 39: 255 | III/2.2: 99 | ↔ Z 1003; text by Müller von Königsberg | 00470 |
| 401 | 5. | 1750 or earlier | chorale setting "O Lamm Gottes, unschuldig" | F maj. | SATB | 39: 255 | III/2.2: 94 | after Z 4361a; text by Decius after Agnus Dei | 00471 |
| 402 | 5. | 1750 or earlier | chorale setting "O Mensch, bewein dein Sünde groß" | E♭ maj. | SATB | 39: 256 | III/2.2: 114 | after Z 8303; text by Heyden | 00472 |
| 403 | 5. | 1750 or earlier | chorale setting "O Mensch, schau Jesum Christum an" | G Dor. | SATB | 39: 257 | III/2.2: 116 | after Z 3994a–b; text by Specht; ↔ Z 3994c | 00473 |
| 404 | 5. | 1750 or earlier | chorale setting "O Traurigkeit, o Herzeleid" | A min. | SATB | 39: 257 | III/2.2: 34 | after Z 1915; text by Rist | 00474 |
| 404 | 5. | 1750 or earlier | chorale setting "O Traurigkeit, o Herzeleid" | F min. | SATB | | III/2.2: 215 | after Z 1915; text by Rist | 00474 |
| 393 | 5. | c. 1735 or earlier | chorale setting "O Welt, sieh hier dein Leben" | A maj. | SATB | 39: 251 | III/2.1: 44; III/2.2: 163 | after Z 2293b; text by Gerhardt | 00463 |
| 394 | 5. | c. 1735 or earlier | chorale setting "O Welt, sieh hier dein Leben" | A maj. | SATB | 39: 252 | III/2.1: 96; III/2.2: 210 | after Z 2293b; text by Gerhardt | 00464 |
| 395 | 5. | 1724–1750 | chorale setting "O Welt, sieh hier dein Leben" | A maj. | SATB | 39: 252 | III/2.2: 208 | after BWV 245/11; text by Gerhardt | 00465 |
| 405 | 5. | 1750 or earlier | chorale setting "O wie selig seid ihr doch, ihr Frommen" | D min. | SATB | 39: 258 | III/2.2: 124 | after Z 1583; text by Dach; ↔ BWV 495 | 00475 |
| 406 | 5. | 1750 or earlier | chorale setting "O wie selig seid ihr doch, ihr Frommen" | D min. | SATB | 39: 258 | III/2.2: 129 | after Z 1581; text by Dach | 00476 |
| 407 | 5. | 1750 or earlier | chorale setting "O wir armen Sünder" | D maj. | SATB | 39: 258 | III/2.2: 114 | after Z 8187c; text by Bonnus | 00477 |
| 408 | 5. | 1750 or earlier | chorale setting "Schaut, ihr Sünder" | G Dor. | SATB | 39: 259 | III/2.2: 98 | after Z 8569/B; text by Löwenstern | 00478 |
| 409 | 5. | 1750 or earlier | chorale setting "Seelenbräutigam" | A maj. | SATB | 39: 260 | III/2.2: 82, 216 | after Z 3255a–b; text by Drese; ↔ BWV 496 | 00479 |
| 410 | 5. | 1750 or earlier | chorale setting "Sei gegrüßet, Jesu gütig" | G min. | SATB | 39: 260 | III/2.2: 98 | after Z 3889b; text by Keymann; ↔ BWV 499 | 00480 |
| 411 | 5. | 1750 or earlier | chorale setting "Singt dem Herrn ein neues Lied" | G maj. | SATB | 39: 260 | III/2.2: 146 | after Z 6424; text by Löwenstern | 00481 |
| 412 | 5. | 1750 or earlier | chorale setting "So gibst du nun, mein Jesu, gute Nacht" | G Dor. | SATB | 39: 261 | III/2.2: 119 | after Z 849; text by Pfeiffer; ↔ BWV 501 | 00482 |
| 413 | 5. | 1750 or earlier | chorale setting "Sollt ich meinem Gott nicht singen" | D min. | SATB | 39: 262 | III/2.2: 130 | after Z 7886b; text by Gerhardt; ↔ BWV 481 | 00483 |
| 414 | 5. | 1750 or earlier | chorale setting "Uns ist ein Kindlein heut geborn" | G maj. | SATB | 39: 262 | III/2.2: 86 | after Z 439; ↔ BWV 253 | 00484 |
| 415 | 5. | 1750 or earlier | chorale setting "Valet will ich dir geben" | D maj. | SATB | 39: 263 | III/2.2: 16 | after Z 5404a; text by Herberger | 00485 |
| 416 | 5. | 1724-04-07 | chorale setting "Vater unser im Himmelreich" | D min. | SATB | 39: 263 | III/2.1: 94; III/2.2: 27 | after Z 2561; text by Luther after Mt 6:9–13; ↔ BWV 245.1/5 | 00486 |
| 417 | 5. | c. 1735 or earlier | chorale setting "Von Gott will ich nicht lassen" | B min. | SATB | 39: 264 | III/2.1: 92; III/2.2: 209 | after Z 5264b; text by Helmbold | 00487 |
| 418 | 5. | 1750 or earlier | chorale setting "Von Gott will ich nicht lassen" | A min. | SATB | 39: 264 | III/2.2: 192 | after Z 5264b; text by Helmbold | 00488 |
| 419 | 5. | 1726–1761 (CPE) | chorale setting "Helft mir Gotts Güte preisen" | A min. | SATB | 39: 265 | III/2.2: 64 | by Bach, C. P. E.; after BWV 16/6; text by Eber | 00489 |
| 419 | 5. | 1726–1761 (CPE) | chorale setting "Von Gott will ich nicht lassen" | A min. | SATB | 39: 265 | III/2.2: 64 | by Bach, C. P. E.; after BWV 16/6; text by Helmbold | 00489 |
| 257 | 5. | c. 1735 or earlier | chorale setting "Wär Gott nicht mit uns diese Zeit" | A min. | SATB | 39: 178 | III/2.1: 46; III/2.2: 170 | after Z 4441a; text by Luther after Ps. 124 | 00327 |
| 420 | 5. | 1750 or earlier | chorale setting "Warum betrübst du dich, mein Herz" | A min. | SATB | 39: 265 | III/2.2: 84 | after Z 1689a | 00490 |
| 421 | 5. | c. 1735 or earlier | chorale setting "Warum betrübst du dich, mein Herz" | A min. | SATB | 39: 266 | III/2.1: 65; III/2.2: 178 | after Z 1689a; ↔ BWV 1164/2 | 00491 |
| 422 | 5. | c. 1735 or earlier | chorale setting "Warum sollt ich mich denn grämen" | G Mix. | SATB | 39: 266 | III/2.1: 82; III/2.2: 204 | after Z 6461; → Z 6462; text by Gerhardt | 00492 |
| 423 | 5. | 1750 or earlier | chorale setting "Was betrübst du dich, mein Herze" | G Dor. | SATB | 39: 267 | III/2.2: 140 | ↔ Z 6830; text by Herrmann | 00493 |
| 424 | 5. | 1750 or earlier | chorale setting "Was bist du doch, o Seele, so betrübet" | A min. | SATB | 39: 267 | III/2.2: 108 | after Z 1837; text by Schultt, R. F.; ↔ BWV 506 | 00494 |
| 425 | 5. | 1750 or earlier | chorale setting "Was willst du dich, o meine Seele, kränken" | A min. | SATB | 39: 268 | III/2.2: 142 | after Z 7844; text by Werder | 00495 |
| 426 | 5. | 1750 or earlier | chorale setting "Weltlich Ehr und zeitlich Gut" | C maj. | SATB | 39: 269 | III/2.2: 122 | after Z 4972; text by Weiße | 00496 |
| 427 | 5. | 1750 or earlier | chorale setting "Wenn ich in Angst und Not" | E♭ maj. | SATB | 39: 269 | III/2.2: 85 | after Z 4233; text by Löwenstern | 00497 |
| 428 | 5. | 1750 or earlier | chorale setting "Wenn mein Stündlein verhanden ist" | G maj. | SATB | 39: 270 | III/2.2: 187 | after Z 4482a; text by Herman | 00498 |
| 429 | 5. | c. 1735 or earlier | chorale setting "Wenn mein Stündlein verhanden ist" | A maj. | SATB | 39: 270 | III/2.1: 91; III/2.2: 29 | after Z 4482a; text by Herman | 00499 |
| 430 | 5. | c. 1735 or earlier | chorale setting "Wenn mein Stündlein verhanden ist" | A maj. | SATB | 39: 271 | III/2.1: 68; III/2.2: 201 | after Z 4482a; text by Herman | 00500 |
| 431 | 5. | 1750 or earlier | chorale setting "Wenn wir in höchsten Nöten sein" | F maj. | SATB | 39: 272 | III/2.2: 38 | after Z 394; text by Eber | 00501 |
| 432 | 5. | 1750 or earlier | chorale setting "Wenn wir in höchsten Nöten sein" | G maj. | SATB | 39: 272 | III/2.2: 146 | after Z 394; text by Eber | 00502 |
| 433 | 5. | 1750 or earlier | chorale setting "Wer Gott vertraut, hat wohl gebaut" | G maj. | SATB | 39: 273 | III/2.2: 78 | after Z 8207; text by Magdeburg | 00503 |
| 434 | 5. | c. 1735 or earlier | chorale setting "Wer weiß, wie nahe mir mein Ende" | A min. | SATB | 39: 273 | III/2.1: 38 | after Z 2778; text by Emilie Juliane of B-M | 00504 |
| 434 | 5. | c. 1735 or earlier | chorale setting "Wer nur den lieben Gott lässt walten" | A min. | SATB | 39: 273 | III/2.2: 85 | after Z 2778; text by Neumark | 00504 |
| 435 | 5. | 1750 or earlier | chorale setting "Wie bist du, Seele, in mir so gar betrübt" | E min. | SATB | 39: 274 | III/2.2: 143 | after Z 4092; text by Zeutschner | 00505 |
| 436 | 5. | c. 1735 or earlier | chorale setting "Wie schön leuchtet der Morgenstern" | E maj. | SATB | 39: 274 | III/2.1: 45; III/2.2: 165 | after Z 8359; text by Nicolai | 00506 |
| 437 | 5. | 1750 or earlier | chorale setting "Wir glauben all an einen Gott" | D Dor. | SATB | 39: 275 | III/2.2: 76 | after Z 7971; text by Luther after Creed | 00507 |
| 258 | 5. | 1750 or earlier | chorale setting "Wo Gott der Herr nicht bei uns hält" | B min. | SATB | 39: 179 | III/2.2: 194 | after Z 4441a; text by Jonas | 00328 |
| 438 | 5. | 1750 or earlier | chorale setting "Wo Gott zum Haus nicht gibt sein Gunst" | F maj. | SATB | 39: 276 | III/2.2: 90 | after Z 305; text by Kolross | 00508 |

==== In the 1725 Notebook for Anna Magdalena Bach ====
Included in the second Notebook for Anna Magdalena Bach (started 1725): BWV 299: "Dir, dir, Jehova, will ich singen" (included as No. 39, in both a four-part chorale version and a voice and bass version) • BWV 397: "O Ewigkeit, du Donnerwort" (included as No. 42 in a voice and bass version = BWV 513)

==== With a voice and bass variant in Schemellis Gesangbuch ====
Two-part versions in Schemellis Gesangbuch: No. 40 (3), BWV 447 → BWV 297 • No. 281 (18), BWV 481 → BWV 413 • No. 293 (22), BWV 499 → BWV 410 • No. 296 (23), BWV 500 ↔ BWV 500a, four-part variant in St Mark Passion pasticcio • No. 315 (26), BWV 501 → BWV 412 • No. 320 (27), BWV 441 → BWV 441^{*} or deest • No. 397 (32), BWV 452 → BWV 299 • No. 488 (37), BWV 461 → BWV 320 • No. 741 (53), BWV 470 → BWV 357 • No. 779 (55), BWV 506 → BWV 424 • No. 881 (63), BWV 488 → BWV 258 • No. 894 (65), BWV 495 → BWV 405

==== Other four-part chorales in early manuscripts ====
Authenticated as Bach's after the first edition (1950) of the Bach-Werke-Verzeichnis: BWV 1089: "Da Jesus an dem Kreuze stund" • BWV 1122: "Denket doch, ihr Menschenkinder" • BWV 1123: "Wo Gott zum Haus nicht gibt sein Gunst" • BWV 1124: "Ich ruf zu dir, Herr Jesu Christ" • BWV 1125: "O Gott, du frommer Gott" • BWV 1126: "Lobet Gott, unsern Herren" • BWV deest: "Liebster Gott, wenn werd ich sterben"

== See also ==
- List of compositions by Johann Sebastian Bach
- List of Bach cantatas (BWV 1–231)
- List of songs and arias by Johann Sebastian Bach (BWV 439–518)

== Sources ==
- Dirst, Matthew (2017), "Early Posthumous Published Editions", in Leaver, Robin A. (ed.), The Routledge Research Companion to Johann Sebastian Bach, Taylor & Francis, pp. 464–474, ISBN 978-1-4094-1790-3
- Dürr, Alfred; Kobayashi, Yoshitake, eds. (1998). Bach Werke Verzeichnis: Kleine Ausgabe – Nach der von Wolfgang Schmieder vorgelegten 2. Ausgabe [Bach Works Catalogue: Small Edition – After Wolfgang Schmieder's 2nd edition] (in German). Kirsten Beißwenger (collaborator) (BWV^{2a} ed.). Wiesbaden: Breitkopf & Härtel. ISBN 978-3-7651-0249-3. Preface in English and German.
- Melamed, Daniel R.; Marissen, Michael (2006), "Four-part chorales", An Introduction to Bach Studies, Oxford University Press, pp. 124–126, ISBN 978-0-19-530492-3
- Platen, Emil [in German] (1976). "Zur Echtheit einiger Choralsätze Johann Sebastian Bachs" [On the authenticity of some of Johann Sebastian Bach's chorale settings]. In Schulze, Hans-Joachim; Wolff, Christoph (eds.). Bach-Jahrbuch 1975 [Bach Yearbook 1975]. Bach-Jahrbuch (in German). Vol. 61. Neue Bachgesellschaft. Evangelische Verlagsanstalt. pp. 50–62. doi:10.13141/bjb.v1975.
- Schulze, Hans-Joachim (1983). ""150 Stücke von den Bachischen Erben": Zur Überlieferung der vierstimmigen Choräle Johann Sebastian Bachs" ["150 pieces from the Bach estate": on the transmission of Johann Sebastian Bach's four-part chorales]. In Schulze, Hans-Joachim; Wolff, Christoph (eds.). Bach-Jahrbuch 1983 [Bach Yearbook 1983]. Bach-Jahrbuch (in German). Vol. 69. Neue Bachgesellschaft. Berlin: Evangelische Verlagsanstalt. pp. 81–100. doi:10.13141/bjb.v1983. ISSN 0084-7682.
- Schulze, Hans-Joachim (1996), "J.S. Bach's Vocal Works in the Breitkopf Nonthematic Catalogs of 1761 to 1836", in George B. Stauffer (ed.), J.S. Bach, the Breitkopfs, and Eighteenth-century Music Trade, Bach Perspectives, vol. 2, University of Nebraska Press, pp. 35–52, ISBN 0-8032-1044-2
- Johann Theodor Mosewius. Johann Sebastian Bach in seinen Kirchen-Cantaten und Choralgesängen. Berlin: T. Trautwein, 1845.
- Zahn, Johannes (1889–1893). Die Melodien der deutschen evangelischen Kirchenlieder (in German). Gütersloh: Bertelsmann. Vol. I, Vol. II, Vol. III, Vol. IV, Vol. V, Vol. VI
