= Da der Herr Christ zu Tische saß =

Christian hymn

- Lutheran Passion hymn
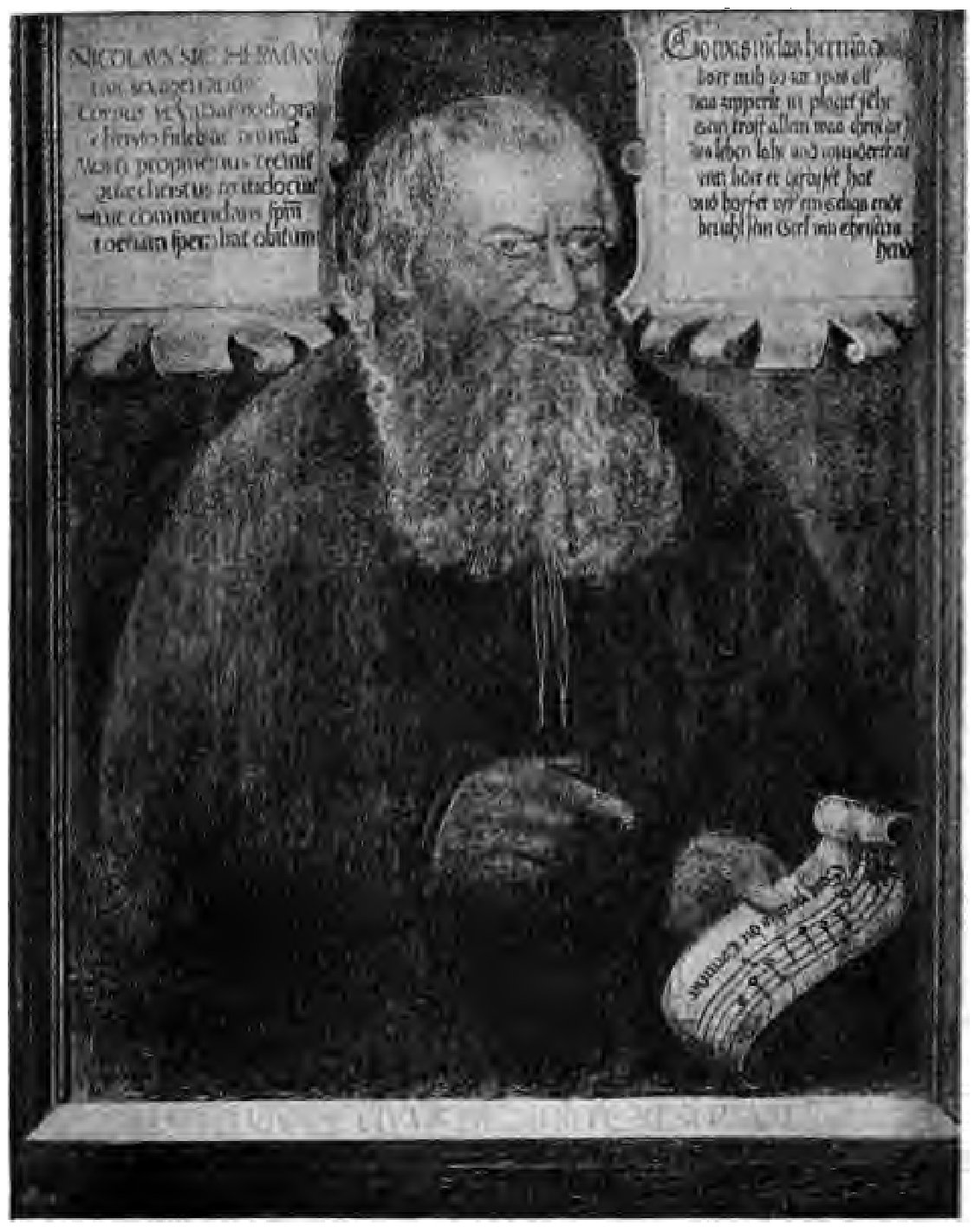
- The author pictured on the title page of Die Sonntagsevangelia, in which the hymn appeared in 1560
- English: When the Lord Christ sat at the table
- Written: 1560
- Text: by Nikolaus Herman
- Language: German
- Melody: in Görlitz (1611)

"Da der Herr Christ zu Tische saß" ("When the Lord Christ sat at the table") is a Christian hymn related to the Passion of Jesus. The 28 stanza text was written by Nikolaus Herman and first published in 1560. Later Johann Sebastian Bach composed the four-part setting, BWV 285.

== History ==
Herman wrote "Da der Herr Christ zu Tische saß" as a text in 28 stanzas of six lines each, reflecting the Passion of Jesus. The hymn opens referring to the Last Supper, and continues with the appeal to always remember the death and bitter suffering ("Tod und bitter Leiden"). The hymnologist Philipp Wackernagel notes in his Bibliography on the history of German hymns of the 16th century, from 1855, that the hymn appeared in a Wittenberg hymnal by Nikolaus Herman from 1560, Die Sonntagsevangelia über das Jahr in Gesänge verfasset für die Kinder und christlichen Hausväter (The Sundays' Gospels through the year in songs written for the children and Christian fathers). It came with the header "Die Passion / unsers HERRN Jhesu / Christi, Im Thon, Kompt her zu mir / spricht Gottes son, etc. Oder, / Ich hab mein sach zu Gott / gestellt, etc." ("The Passion / of our LORD Jesus / Christ, to the melody, Kompt her zu mir ...).

While the first publication mentioned two melodies to which the words could be sung ("Kommt her zu mir, spricht Gottes Sohn" and "Ich hab mein Sach zu Gott gestellt"), the melody associated with the text today appeared first in Görlitz in 1611. The hymn is contained with this melody in the hymnal by Gottfried Vopelius on page 140. Johann Hermann Schein composed a choral setting as part of his Cantional, oder Gesangbuch Augsburgischer Konfession in 1627. Johann Sebastian Bach composed a four-part setting, BWV 285, which is without text. It was published as No. 196 in the collection of chorales by Johann Philipp Kirnberger und Carl Philipp Emanuel Bach. Bach's biographer Philipp Spitta counts the hymn tune as one of the few attributed to Bach. He reports that the four-part setting appeared in Balthasar Reimann's Hirschberg chorale book of 1747.
