= Jesu, der du meine Seele =

1724 church cantata by Johann Sebastian Bach

- Lutheran hymn
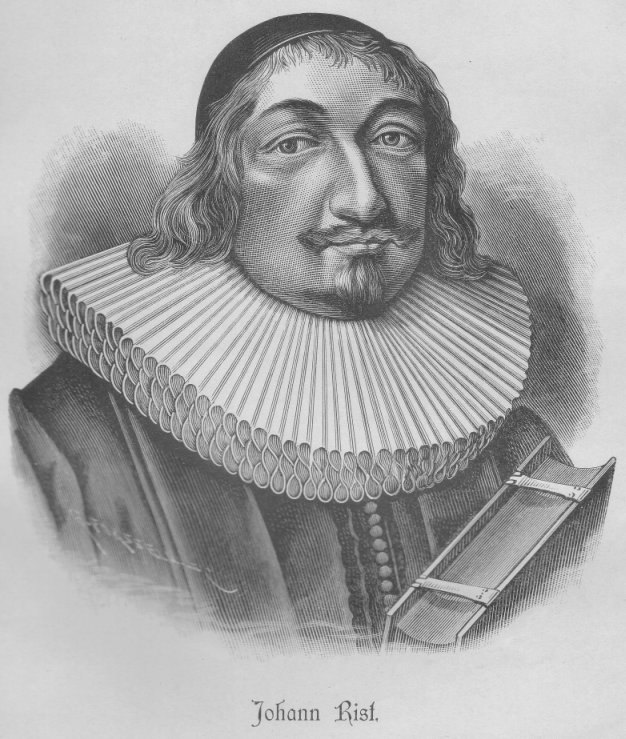
- Johann Rist, the author of the text
- Text: by Johann Rist
- Language: German
- Melody: by Johann Rist
- Published: 1641

Jesu, der du meine Seele (Jesus, you who [rescued] my soul) is a Lutheran Passion hymn in German with text by Johann Rist and a melody also attributed to him, first published in 1641. It reflects in 12 stanzas the Passion of Jesus cleansing the believer. Johann Sebastian Bach used it as the basis for his chorale cantata Jesu, der du meine Seele, BWV 78.

== History ==
Johann Rist wrote the text in 12 stanzas, reflecting the Passion of Jesus with a focus on cleansing the believer. The hymn was published in 1641 with a melody also attributed to Rist.

The song was contained in many hymnals, but interest faded in the 19th century. In the 21st century, the hymn is no longer part of major hymnals in Germany, but of the Moravian Church.

== Music ==
The hymn became the basis for Johann Sebastian Bach's chorale cantata Jesu, der du meine Seele, BWV 78 for the 14th Sunday after Trinity, first performed on 10 September 1724. Bach used the original text of the first and last stanzas, together with the melody, for the opening chorus and the closing chorale. He set the last stanza, "Herr, ich glaube, hilf mir Schwachen, laß mich ja verzagen nicht" (Lord, I believe, help my weakness, let me never despair), for four parts.

Reinhard Schwarz-Schilling composed an chorale prelude for organ in 1929.
