= Ich armer Mensch, ich Sündenknecht, BWV 55 =

1726 church cantata by Johann Sebastian Bach

Ich armer Mensch, ich Sündenknecht
- BWV 55
- Church cantata by J. S. Bach
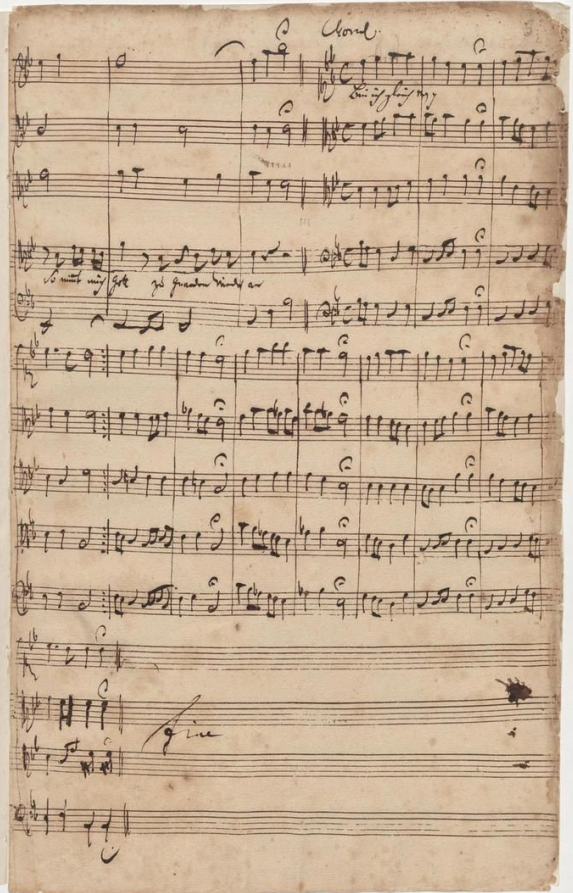
- The final page from the original manuscript of BWV 55, with the concluding four-part chorale
- Occasion: 22nd Sunday after Trinity
- Cantata text: Christoph Birkmann
- Chorale: "Werde munter, mein Gemüte"
- Performed: 17 November 1726: Leipzig
- Movements: 5
- Vocal: tenor solo; SATB choir
- Instrumental: flauto traverso; oboe d'amore; 2 violins; viola; continuo

Johann Sebastian Bach composed the church cantata Ich armer Mensch, ich Sündenknecht (I pitiful man, I slave of sin), BWV 55, in Leipzig for the 22nd Sunday after Trinity and first performed it on 17 November 1726.

Bach composed the cantata in his fourth year as Thomaskantor (director of church music) in Leipzig. The text was written by Christoph Birkmann, who derived it from the prescribed Gospel of the day, the parable of the unforgiving servant. He contrasted God's justice and unjust men, alluding to the Bible in several ways. The composition is a solo cantata for tenor, structured in five movements. Alternating arias and recitatives are concluded by a closing chorale, setting the sixth stanza of Johann Rist "Werde munter, mein Gemüte". The voice is accompanied by a small Baroque instrumental ensemble of flauto traverso, oboe d'amore, strings and basso continuo.

== History and words ==
In his fourth year as the Thomaskantor in Leipzig, Bach wrote the cantata for the 22nd Sunday after Trinity, 17 November 1726. It is Bach's only extant cantata for tenor, and followed solo cantatas for alto and bass. The last three movements of the autograph score differ from the Leipzig performance parts, leading some to conclude they were originally part of an earlier composition, possibly the lost 1717 Weimar Passion. The Bach scholar Andreas Glöckner noted that movements 3―5 might have been part of a Passion composed before Bach moved to Leipzig, while movement 5 might come from a still different source. Felix Loy, the editor of a 2011 critical edition for Carus, notes that the parts of movements 1―2 show many corrections, while those of the other movements look like a "fair copy"; he thinks that the score of movements 3―5 was possibly copied from an older model later, possibly for a repeat performance.

The prescribed readings for the Sunday were from the Epistle to the Philippians, thanks and prayer for the congregation in Philippi (Philippians 1:3–11), and from the Gospel of Matthew, the parable of the unforgiving servant (Matthew 18:23–35). Christoph Birkmann, the poet of the cantata text, stressed the opposites of the gospel, God's justice versus unjust men, in the words of the first aria "Er ist gerecht, ich ungerecht" ("He is just, unjust am I"). In the first two movements the singer reflects his sinful condition, in the following two he asks God for mercy, beginning both with Erbarme dich ("Have mercy"). The following closing chorale is the sixth stanza of Johann Rist "Werde munter, mein Gemüte", published in 1642. Bach used the same verse later in his St Matthew Passion, again following Erbarme dich, the aria of Peter, regretting his denial of Jesus, composed the following year.

Bach led the first performance on 17 November 1726.

=== Structure and scoring ===
Bach structured the cantata in five movements, alternating arias and recitatives and a closing chorale. He scored it intimately for tenor solo (T), a four-part choir (only in the closing chorale), and a Baroque instrumental ensemble of flauto traverso (Ft), oboe d'amore (Oa), two violins (Vl), viola (Va), and basso continuo.

In the following table, the scoring is based on the Neue Bach-Ausgabe. The keys and time signatures are taken from Alfred Dürr's book Die Kantaten von Johann Sebastian Bach, using the symbol for common time. The continuo, played throughout, is not listed.

Movements of Ich armer Mensch, ich Sündenknecht
No.	Title	Text	Type	Vocal	Winds	Strings	Key	Time
1	Ich armer Mensch, ich Sündenknecht	Birkmann	Aria	T	Ft Oa	2Vl	B-flat major	6/8
2	Ich habe wider Gott gehandelt	Birkmann	Recitative	T				common time
3	Erbarme dich! Laß die Tränen dich erweichen	Birkmann	Aria	T	Ft		D minor	common time
4	Erbarme dich! Jedoch nun tröst ich mich	Birkmann	Recitative	T		2Vl Va		common time
5	Bin ich gleich von dir gewichen	Rist	Chorale	SATB	Ft Oa	2Vl Va	B-flat major	cut time

== Music ==
A rich polyphonic setting for flute, oboe d'amore and two violins, without viola, accompanies the opening aria. The motifs seem to illustrate the faltering steps and the despairing heart of the steward summoned before his master. The second aria is as expressive, accompanied by a virtuoso flute. The first recitative is secco, but the second one is accompanied by string chords.

The closing chorale is verse 6 of Johann Rist's "Werde munter", to Johann Schop's tune. The same text and melody occur in the St Matthew Passion, there in a simpler four-part setting. Bach also used Schop's melody with other texts such as the well known "Jesu, Joy of Man's Desiring" from Herz und Mund und Tat und Leben, BWV 147.

== Manuscripts and publication ==
The manuscripts of both the score and the parts survive. The first critical edition of the cantata, edited by Wilhelm Rust, was published by the Bach Gesellschaft in 1863 as part of its complete edition of Bach's works. In the Neue Bach-Ausgabe, the second edition of Bach's works, the cantata was published in 1994, edited by Andreas Glöckner.

Carus published a critical edition in German and English as part of its Stuttgarter Bach-Ausgaben in 2011, edited by Felix Loy. In the 21st century, Bach Digital published high-resolution facsimile images of the manuscript parts from the first quarter of the 18th century.

== Recordings ==
The following table is a selection from the Bach Cantatas website, where 57 recordings are listed as of 2026. Instrumental groups playing period instruments in historically informed performances are marked by green background under the header "Instr.".

Recordings of Ich armer Mensch, ich Sündenknecht
Title	Conductor / Choir / Orchestra	Soloists	Label	Year	Instr.
Bach Cantatas Vol. 5	Karl Richter Münchener Bach-Chor Münchener Bach-Orchester	Ernst Haefliger	Archiv Produktion	1959	
Bach Made in Germany Vol. 3 – Cantatas II	Erhard Mauersberger Thomanerchor Gewandhausorchester	Peter Schreier	Eterna	1960	
Bach: Solokantaten	Hans-Martin Linde Schola Cantorum Basiliensis	Nicolai Gedda	EMI	1971	
J. S. Bach: Das Kantatenwerk • Complete Cantatas • Les Cantates, Folge / Vol. 3	Gustav Leonhardt Knabenchor Hannover Leonhardt-Consort	Kurt Equiluz	Teldec	1975	Period
Die Bach Kantate Vol. 57	Helmuth Rilling Gächinger Kantorei Bach-Collegium Stuttgart	Adalbert Kraus	Hänssler	1982	
J. S. Bach: Kantate BWV 55 · Concerto a-Moll	Peter Schreier RIAS Kammerchor Kammerorchester Carl Philipp Emanuel Bach	Peter Schreier	Philips	1994	Period
Bach Kantaten BWV 35, BWV 169, BWV 49 (Sinfonia)	Matthias Eisenberg Thomanerchor Leipziger Barockorchester	Martin Petzold	RAM	1998	Period
Bach Edition Vol. 11 – Cantatas Vol. 5	Pieter Jan Leusink Holland Boys Choir Netherlands Bach Collegium	Knut Schoch	Brilliant Classics	1999	Period
Cantatas, Arias & Motet	Ludwig Güttler Virtuosi Saxoniae	Christoph Genz	Dresden Classics	1999	Period
Bach Cantatas Vol. 12	John Eliot Gardiner Monteverdi Choir English Baroque Soloists	James Gilchrist	Soli Deo Gloria	2000	Period
J. S. Bach: Complete Cantatas Vol. 18	Ton Koopman Amsterdam Baroque Orchestra & Choir	Christoph Prégardien	Antoine Marchand	2002	Period
J. S. Bach: Cantatas for the Complete Liturgical Year Vol. 1	Sigiswald Kuijken La Petite Bande	Sophie Karthäuser; Petra Noskaiová; Christoph Genz; Dominik Wörner	Accent	2004	Period
J. S. Bach: Cantatas Vol. 38 (Solo Cantatas)	Masaaki Suzuki Bach Collegium Japan	Gerd Türk	BIS	2006	Period
J. S. Bach: Kantate BWV 55 "Ich armer Mensch, ich Sündenknecht"	Rudolf Lutz Schola Seconda Pratica	Bernhard Berchthold	Gallus Media	2011	Period
