= Dedekind (surname) =

Dedekind is a German surname. Notable people with the surname include:

- Brendon Dedekind (born 1976), South African swimmer
- Constantin Christian Dedekind (1628–1715), German poet, dramatist and composer
- Friedrich Dedekind (1524–1598), German humanist, theologian, and bookseller
- Henning Dedekind (1562–1626), German composer, grandfather of Constantin Christian Dedekind
- Katja Dedekind (born 2001), Australian Paralympic swimmer and goalball player
- Richard Dedekind (1831–1916), German mathematician

- 19293 Dedekind, asteroid named after Richard Dedekind
