= Franz Joachim Burmeister =

Franz Joachim Burmeister (29 October 1633 – 21 April 1672) was a German Protestant hymn writer.

Born in Lüneburg, Burmeister was the son of the church musician (Kantor) at St. Michaelis in Lüneburg, Anton Burmeister, and his wife Dorothea, née Pörtken, and the nephew of the musicologist Joachim Burmeister.

In 1660, Burmeister was included by his friend Johann Rist in the Elbschwanenorden. He held a position as preacher (Prediger) at St. Michaelis from 1670. Many of his hymns were set to music by Johann Rudolph Ahle. The best-known hymn is "Es ist genug", especially by its setting in Bach's cantata O Ewigkeit, du Donnerwort, BWV 60, which Alban Berg quoted in his Violin Concerto. Burmeister died in his hometown.

== Literature ==
- Paul Pressel (1876). "Burmeister, Franz Joachim". Allgemeine Deutsche Biographie (in German). Vol. 3. Leipzig: Duncker & Humblot. p. 628.
- Paul Gabriel (1957). "Burmeister, Franz Joachim". Neue Deutsche Biographie (in German). Vol. 3. Berlin: Duncker & Humblot. p. 54. (.html full text online).
- Hans-Cord Sarnighausen: Die Lüneburger Kirchenmusiker und Prediger Burmeister um 1600, in: Zeitschrift für Niederdeutsche Familienkunde, Heft 4/2002, S. 531–539.
