= Werde munter, mein Gemüte =

Christian hymn in German

- Lutheran German hymn
- The beginning of Bach's setting of the sixth stanza in his St Matthew Passion
- Catalogue: Zahn 6551
- Text: by Johann Rist
- Melody: by Johann Schop
- Published: 1642

"Werde munter, mein Gemüte" (Become cheerful, my mind) is a Lutheran evening hymn by Johann Rist, consisting of twelve stanzas with eight lines each, first printed in 1642. The melody was composed by Johann Schop. A setting of the melody by J. S. Bach in his cantata Herz und Mund und Tat und Leben, BWV 147, became famous as the arrangement Jesu, Joy of Man's Desiring. The hymn has been translated to English and appears in 67 hymnals.

== History ==
The hymn was first published as "Dritte Zehen" (third ten) of Rist's Himlische Lieder (Heavenly songs) in Lüneburg in 1642. It was subtitled "A Christian evening hymn, with which to commit oneself to the protection of the Most High". Johann Crüger included it in the 1656 edition of his Praxis pietatis melica.

== Melody and musical settings ==
The hymn tune, Zahn No. 6551, is by Johann Schop, who often collaborated with Rist. Georg Philipp Telemann composed a cantata Werde munter, mein Gemüte, TWV 1:1576, for choir, strings and continuo before 1760. Johann Sebastian Bach used the hymn's sixth stanza, "Bin ich gleich von dir gewichen", in his cantata Ich armer Mensch, ich Sündenknecht, BWV 55, and in his St Matthew Passion. Max Reger composed a chorale prelude as No. 48 of his 52 Chorale Preludes, Op. 67 in 1902, and Sigfrid Karg-Elert wrote an improvisation as part of his 66 Chorale improvisations for organ, Op. 65.

The same hymn melody was assigned to the song "Jesu, meiner Seelen Wonne" written by Martin Janus (or Jahn). Bach used it in the Leipzig version of his cantata Herz und Mund und Tat und Leben, BWV 147. It became famous as the arrangement Jesu, Joy of Man's Desiring.

The tune for "Werde munter" was also paired with "Like the Golden Sun Ascending," which was translated from selected stanzas of Thomas Kingo's 1689 "Som den gyldne Sol frembryder."

== Translations ==
Translations to English were made by J. C. Jacobi, who published "Rouse thy self my Soul and gather" in his Psalmodia Germanica in 1722, and by Catherine Winkworth, who published "Sink not yet, my soul, to slumber" in 1858 in her Lyra Germanica. The song appeared in 67 hymnals.
