= Balthasar Kindermann =

German poet

- Born: 10 April 1636; Zittau
- Died: 12 February 1706 (aged 69); Magdeburg
- Education: University of Wittenberg
- Occupations: Teacher; Poet; Pastor

Balthasar Benjamin Kindermann (10 April 1636 – 12 February 1706) was a German poet, teacher and pastor.

Kindermann was born in Zittau, the son of a Schwertfeger, a smith who specialized in weapons. He attended the Gymnasium of his home town and was encouraged by Elias Weise. In 1654 he enrolled at the University of Wittenberg to study theology, but he also studied poetry and rhetoric with August Buchner. In 1657 he earned his master's degree in theology. One year later he was crowned as poeta laureatus by Johann Rist; he was made a member of Rist's Elbschwanenorden, the "Order of Swans of the Elbe", an association interested in language, in 1660.

In 1659 Kindermann became vice principal of the Saldernsche Schule in Brandenburg an der Havel, and was appointed rector in 1664. In 1660 he married Dorothea Schiffner, the daughter of a Swedish captain, with whom he had four sons and two daughters. In 1667 he went to Magdeburg as a deacon at the Johanniskirche. From 1672 he served as first pastor of the Ulrichskirche. He succeeded Christian Scriver in 1690 and became head of the school (Scholarch) later. He died in Magdeburg in 1706.

Kindermann's work is extremely versatile: it includes satirical "poems" in the style of Johann Michael Moscherosch, poetic and rhetorical writings, poetry collections, as well as several plays. He wrote Lobgesang des Zerbster Biers (Song of praise of the Zerbst beer) in 1658. His most successful work, Der Deutsche Redner (The German Speaker), a guidebook for speeches, was first published in Frankfurt an der Oder in 1660; it appeared in six editions, was edited in 1680 under the title Teutscher Wolredner and appeared in two more editions.

In 1664, he wrote the hymn "Was frag ich nach der Welt", which Johann Sebastian Bach used as the basis for his chorale cantata Was frag ich nach der Welt, BWV 94, for the ninth Sunday after Trinity of 1724.

== Selected works ==
- Lobgesang des Zerbster Biers Wittenberg 1658
- Der Deutsche Redner (The German Speaker) Frankfurt/Oder 1660
- Unglückselige Nisette Frankfurt/Oder 1660
- Buch der Redlichen Küstrin 1661
- Der Jungfrauen A.B.C. (The Virgins' A.B.C.) Wittenberg 1661
- Schoristen-Teuffel Jena 1661
- Die Böse Sieben Zeitz 1662
- Der Deutsche Poet (The German Poet) Wittenberg 1664
- Kurandors von Sittau Neue Gesichter Wittenberg 1673
