= O Ewigkeit, du Donnerwort, BWV 60 =

Church cantata by Johann Sebastian Bach

O Ewigkeit, du Donnerwort
- BWV 60
- Church cantata; Dialogue cantata; by Johann Sebastian Bach
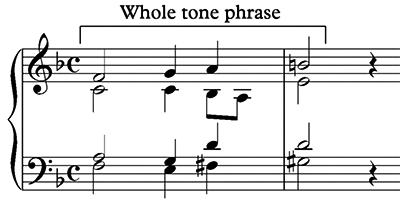
- Beginning of the closing chorale, "Es ist genug"
- Occasion: 24th Sunday after Trinity
- Bible text: Genesis 49:18; Revelation 14:13
- Chorale: "O Ewigkeit, du Donnerwort" by Johann Rist; "Es ist genug" by Franz Joachim Burmeister
- Performed: 7 November 1723: Leipzig
- Movements: 6
- Vocal: alto, tenor and bass; SATB choir
- Instrumental: horn; 2 oboes d'amore; 2 violins; viola; continuo

O Ewigkeit, du Donnerwort (O eternity, you word of thunder), BWV 60, is a church cantata for the 24th Sunday after Trinity composed by Johann Sebastian Bach. It was first performed in Leipzig on 7 November 1723, and is part of Bach's first cantata cycle. It is one of Bach's dialogue cantatas: its topic, fear of death and hope of salvation, plays out mainly through a conversation between two allegorical figures, Fear (sung by an alto voice) and Hope (sung by a tenor).

There are five movements. The orchestral accompaniment is assigned to a Baroque instrumental ensemble of horn, two oboes d'amore, strings and continuo. The first four movements are duets. The opening movement is a chorale fantasia containing a stanza from Johann Rist's "O Ewigkeit, du Donnerwort" and a biblical quotation from the Book of Genesis. The second and third movements are respectively a recitative and an aria.

The fourth movement is a dialogue between Fear and Christ (vox Christi, sung by a bass), who quotes "Selig sind die Toten" from the Book of Revelation. The cantata closes with a four-part setting of Franz Joachim Burmeister's chorale "Es ist genug". Its melody begins with an unusual whole-tone sequence which inspired Alban Berg in the 20th century to incorporate Bach's setting in his Violin Concerto.

== History and words ==
Bach wrote the cantata for the 24th Sunday after Trinity in his first year as Thomaskantor and music director of Leipzig's main churches. During Bach's tenure, the same two readings were prescribed for that Sunday every year: the epistle reading, Colossians 1:9–14, was a prayer from the Epistle to the Colossians for the congregation there, and the Gospel reading was the raising of Jairus' daughter as told in the Gospel of Matthew (Matthew 9:18–26). The unknown librettist of the cantata saw the Gospel story as foreshadowing the resurrection of Jesus. Throughout the cantata, two allegorical figures, Furcht (Fear) and Hoffnung (Hope), engage in a dialogue.

The cantata opens and closes with hymn stanzas, beginning with the first stanza of Johann Rist's 1642 hymn "O Ewigkeit, du Donnerwort", expressing fear, and ending with the last stanza of Franz Joachim Burmeister's 1662 hymn "Es ist genug". Two biblical quotations are juxtaposed in the first and fourth movements. The first movement, "Herr, ich warte auf dein Heil" (Genesis 49:18), spoken by Jacob on his deathbed, expresses hope against the fear conveyed in the chorale. In the fourth movement, Selig sind die Toten (Blessed are the dead, Revelation 14:13) is the answer to the preceding recitative of Fear.

Bach led the first performance of the cantata with the Thomanerchor on 7 November 1723. A year later, Bach composed a chorale cantata on the complete chorale, O Ewigkeit, du Donnerwort, BWV 20, for the first Sunday after Trinity as part of his chorale cantata cycle, while BWV 60 is part of his first cantata cycle. A repeat performance of the earlier cantata took place sometime after 1735, by a continuo part from that time.

== Structure and scoring ==
In O Ewigkeit, du Donnerwort, solo voices perform all movements but the closing chorale. Bach had composed a similarly structured cantata three weeks before, entitled Ich glaube, lieber Herr, hilf meinem Unglauben, BWV 109, which also featured a dialogue between Fear and Hope, given to one singer. In O Ewigkeit, du Donnerwort, he assigns Fear to the alto and Hope to the tenor, and he has them sing three movements in dialogue. In movement 4, Fear is answered instead by the bass, the vox Christi (voice of Christ), with "Selig sind die Toten".

Bach structured the cantata in five movements: four duets of alternating arias and recitatives, concluding with a four-part chorale. He scored the work for three vocal soloists (alto (A), tenor (T) and bass (B)), a four-part choir only in the closing chorale, and a Baroque instrumental ensemble: horn (Co) to support the chorale tunes, two oboes d'amore (Oa), two violins (Vl), viola (Va), and basso continuo (Bc). The title page of the original parts bears a title which Bach wrote himself: "Dominica 24 / post Trinit. / Dialogus Zwischen Furcht u. Hoffnung. / Furcht. O Ewigkeit, du DonnerWort. / Hoffnung. Herr, ich warte auf dein Heÿl. / á / 4 Voci. / 2 Hautb: d’Amour. / 2 Violini / Viola / e / Continuo / di / Joh.Sebast:Bach" (Sunday 24 / after Trinity. / Dialogue Between Fear and Hope / Fear. O Eternity, you Word of Thunder. / Hope. Lord, I wait for Your Salvation. / for / 4 voices / 2 oboes d'amore. / 2 violins / viola / and / continuo / by / Joh.Sebast:Bach). A horn, to support the chorale melodies, was requested only later under the word Viola, possibly in the 19th century. The duration of the work has been stated as 20 minutes.

=== Movements ===
In the following table of the movements, scoring, keys and time signatures are taken from the book by Bach scholar Alfred Dürr, using the symbol for common time (4/4). The instruments are shown separately for winds and strings, while the continuo, playing throughout, is not shown.

Movements of O Ewigkeit, du Donnerwort, BWV 60
No.	Title	Text	Type	Vocal	Winds	Strings	Key	Time
1	O Ewigkeit, du Donnerwort; Herr, ich warte auf dein Heil	Rist; Genesis	Chorale fantasia	A T	Co 2Oa	2Vl Va	D major	common time
2	O schwerer Gang zum letzten Kampf und Streite!; Mein Beistand ist schon da	anon.	Recitative	A T				common time
3	Mein letztes Lager will mich schrecken; Mich wird des Heilands Hand bedecken	anon.	Aria (Duetto)	A T	Oa	Vl solo	B minor	3/4
4	Der Tod bleibt doch der menschlichen Natur verhaßt; Selig sind die Toten	anon.; Revelation	Recitative & chorale	A B				common time
5	Es ist genug	Burmeister	Chorale	SATB	Co 2Oa	2Vl Va	A major	common time

==== 1 ====
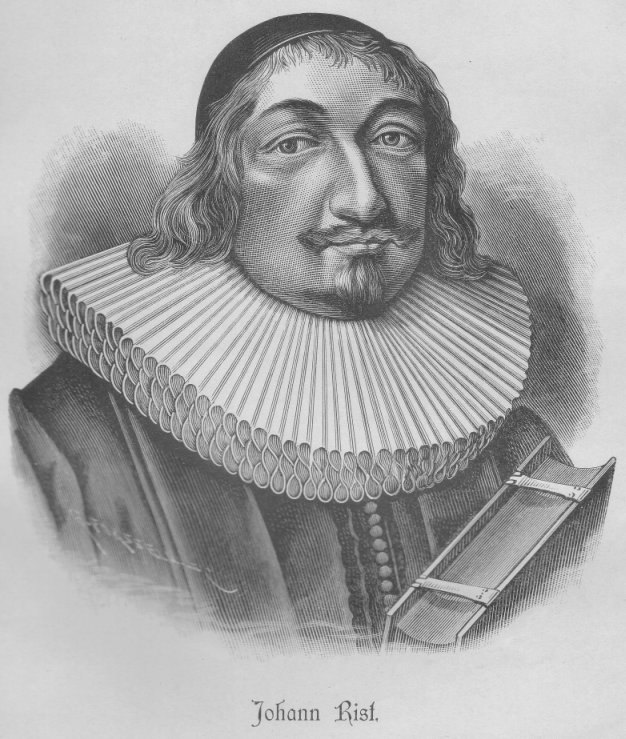
Johann Rist, the author of the hymn

The first duet is a chorale fantasia with added biblical text. The chorale, the first stanza of Rist's hymn "O Ewigkeit, du Donnerwort" (O eternity, you word of thunder), is sung by the alto (Fear), reinforced by the horn. The strings and the continuo play a motif in tremolo throughout the movement which is derived from the second half of the first line of the chorale, and anticipates the beginning of the different closing chorale. John Eliot Gardiner connects the tremolo to Monteverdi's agitated style (stile concitato). The two oboes play a "lamenting" duet. From the second Stollen of the chorale, the tenor as Hope responds with Jacob's words, "Herr, ich warte auf dein Heil" (Lord, I await your salvation). In his book The Creative Development of Johann Sebastian Bach, Richard D. P. Jones describes the movement as "one of Bach's most imaginative conceptions, vivid in its portrayal of conflicting states of the soul".

==== 2 ====
The second duet is a secco recitative. Fear begins "O schwerer Gang zum letzten Kampf und Streite!" (O difficult way to the final battle and struggle!), while Hope confirms "Mein Beistand ist schon da" (My Protector is already there). The music is intensified to an arioso twice: Fear sings the word martert (tortures) as a chromatic melisma accompanied by short chords in the continuo, and Hope stresses the last word ertragen (borne) on a long melisma .

==== 3 ====
The third, central duet is dramatic and therefore not in da capo form but closer to a motet, unified by the instrumental ritornellos. Three different sections are developed in a similar way: Fear begins, "Mein letztes Lager will mich schrecken" (My final bier terrifies me), Hope answers, "Mich wird des Heilands Hand bedecken" (My Savior's hand will cover me), both argue, and Hope has the last word. The instrument parts are included in the dialogue: the solo violin (with Hope) plays scales while the oboes d'amore and the continuo (with Fear) play dotted rhythms.

==== 4 ====
The last duet is no longer between Fear and Hope. Fear begins "Der Tod bleibt doch der menschlichen Natur verhaßt" (But death remains hateful to human nature) in secco recitative, but three times the bass as the vox Christi quotes the consoling words from Revelation "Selig sind die Toten" (Blessed are the dead) as an arioso, each time expanded, following the scheme a ab abc. The American musicologist Eric Chafe analyses that the quotes of the vox Christi are intensified each time by lengthening the quoted text: first "Selig sind die Toten", the second time "Selig sind die Toten, die in dem Herrn sterben" (... who die in the Lord), finally "Selig sind die Toten, die in dem Herrn sterben von nun an." (... from now on). Dürr notes: "The fascination of these ariosos lies in their memorable and eloquent melodic line which presents the text in heightened speech."

==== 5 ====
"Es ist genug", closing chorale

The closing chorale is "Es ist genug" (It is enough). Dürr notes that the melody is by Johann Rudolph Ahle, a predecessor of Bach as organist in Mühlhausen. The melody begins with an unusual sequence of four notes progressing by steps of major seconds (whole tones), together spanning the interval of a tritone, also called "diabolus in musica". During Ahle's time, it was an extreme musical figure, suitable to depict "the soul's crossing over from life into death". Dürr notes further that a similar scale of four notes occurs in Rist's hymn on the word Donnerwort in the first movement, but with the normal half-tone step to the last note. He writes:

... Bach's setting itself, whose harmonization and loosening-up into polyphony allows the text to become, as it were, transparent—something that not even Bach always achieved.

Chafe concludes a thorough analysis of the cantata and the chorale with the summary that "in developing and intensifying traditional, even archaic, ways of understanding music ... Bach carried them far into the future, opening up questions for the analysis, interpretation, and composition of music that are very much with us and are probably timeless".

Alban Berg quoted Bach's chorale setting in his Violin Concerto.

== Publication ==
The original parts of the cantata have survived. After 1800, they belonged to Count Voss-Buch. They were acquired by the Königliche Bibliothek zu Berlin (Royal Library in Berlin), probably in 1851. The cantata was first published in 1863 as part of the first complete edition of Bach's works, the Bach-Gesellschaft Ausgabe. The editor was Wilhelm Rust.

The parts are now held by the Staatsbibliothek zu Berlin, Preußischer Kulturbesitz, shelf number Mus. Ms. Bach St 74. The cantata was published in the New Bach Edition in 1968, edited by Alfred Dürr. Carus-Verlag produced a new critical edition in 1998, edited by Ulrich Leisinger.

== Recordings ==
- Bach Cantatas Vol. 5 – Sundays after Trinity II, Karl Richter, Münchener Bach-Chor, Münchener Bach-Orchester, Hertha Töpper, Ernst Haefliger, Kieth Engen, Archiv Produktion 1964.
- J. S. Bach: Das Kantatenwerk – Sacred Cantatas Vol. 3, Nikolaus Harnoncourt, Tölzer Knabenchor, Concentus Musicus Wien, Paul Esswood, Kurt Equiluz, Ruud van der Meer, Teldec 1976.
- Die Bach Kantate Vol. 59, Helmuth Rilling, Gächinger Kantorei, Bach-Collegium Stuttgart, Helen Watts, Adalbert Kraus, Philippe Huttenlocher, Hänssler 1982 (recorded 1977–1978).
- J. S. Bach: Complete Cantatas Vol. 8, Ton Koopman, Amsterdam Baroque Orchestra & Choir, Bogna Bartosz, Jörg Dürmüller, Klaus Mertens, Antoine Marchand 1999 (recorded 1998).
- J. S. Bach: Cantatas Vol. 15 (Solo Cantatas), Masaaki Suzuki, Bach Collegium Japan, Robin Blaze, Gerd Türk, Peter Kooy, BIS 2001 (recorded 2000).
- Bach Cantatas Vol. 12, John Eliot Gardiner, Monteverdi Choir, English Baroque Soloists, Robin Tyson, James Gilchrist, Peter Harvey, Soli Deo Gloria 2010 (recorded November 2000).
