= O Ewigkeit, du Donnerwort =

Lutheran hymn

- Lutheran hymn
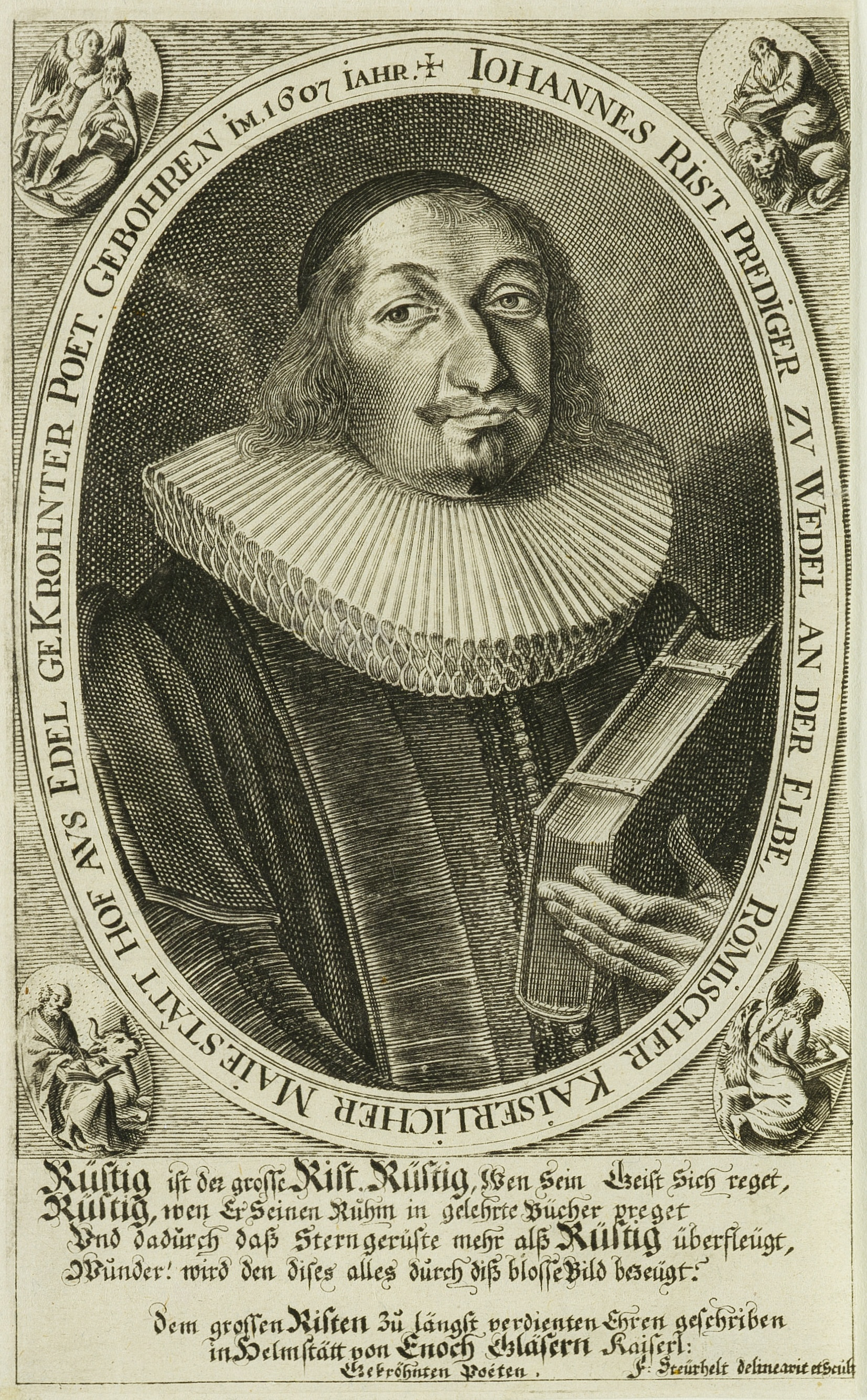
- Johann Rist
- English: O Eternity, you word of thunder
- Text: by Johann Rist
- Language: German
- Melody: by Johann Schop, adapted by Johann Crüger
- Published: 1642

"O Ewigkeit, du Donnerwort" (O Eternity, you word of thunder) is a Lutheran hymn in German, with text by Johann Rist, first published in Lüneburg in 1642. It was translated into English in several versions. The hymn was used in cantata music, including Bach's first chorale cantata of his second cantata cycle, BWV 20.

== History ==
Rist wrote "O Ewigkeit, du Donnerwort" as a poem in 16 stanzas. He published it first in his collection Himlische Lieder (Heavenly songs) in Lüneburg in 1642, p. 51, in 16 stanzas of 8 lines, entitled "An earnest contemplation of the unending Eternity." It was printed in Burg's Gesang-Buch in Breslau in 1746 in full length. Later editions often shortened the song. The melody was written by Johann Schop for "Wach auf, mein Geist, erhebe dich". It was adapted by Johann Crüger for "O Ewigkeit, du Donnerwort" when he published it in the 1653 edition of his hymnal Praxis.

A translation, "Eternity! tremendous Word, Home-striking Point, Heart-piercing Sword", by John Christian Jacobi appeared in 1722, translating 12 stanzas. "Eternity! terrific word", a translation of stanzas 1, 3, 12 and 16, appeared in the American Lutheran General Synod's Collection in 1850, possibly by William Morton Reynolds. It was reprinted in the Ohio Lutheran Hymnal of 1880. Another translation, "Eternity! most awful word" by Arthur Tozer Russell appeared in his Psalms & Hymns in 1851, based on stanzas 1, 2, 9 and 16. A fourth translation, "Eternity, thou word of fear", of stanzas 1, 9, 13 and 16 by Edward Thring was printed in the Uppingham and Sherborne School Hymn Book in 1874.

== Text ==
The text is in 16 stanzas of 8 lines each, with a rhyme scheme AABCCBDD. In a bar form, the stollen have three lines each, while the abgesang has only two lines. In the first edition, a title reads: "An earnest contemplation of the unending Eternity". It has been described as "an impressive and strongly coloured hymn".

== Musical settings ==
Georg Philipp Telemann composed a church cantata: O Ewigkeit, du Donnerwort in 1723. The hymn is used in several of Bach's cantatas. In O Ewigkeit, du Donnerwort, BWV 60, composed for the 24th Sunday after Trinity and first performed on 7 November 1723, the first stanza is used in the opening movement. O Ewigkeit, du Donnerwort, BWV 20, is a chorale cantata for the first Sunday after Trinity. Bach used three stanzas unchanged and the melody in three movements, and treated paraphrases of the other stanzas in recitatives and arias. It was the first cantata in his second cantata cycle which was meant to contain only chorale cantatas.

=== Organ settings ===
Organ preludes were written by Baroque composers such as Tobias Zeutschner, published in Musicalischer Vorschmack in Ratzeburg in 1683, Johann Gottfried Walther and Johann Tobias Krebs. In the 20th century, Sigfrid Karg-Elert set the hymn as No. 42 of his 66 Chorale improvisations for organ, published in 1909, and Felix Draeseke composed a chorale prelude the same year, among others.
