= Herz und Mund und Tat und Leben, BWV 147a =

Church cantata by Johann Sebastian Bach

Herz und Mund und Tat und Leben
- BWV 147.1 ·147a
- Church cantata by Johann Sebastian Bach
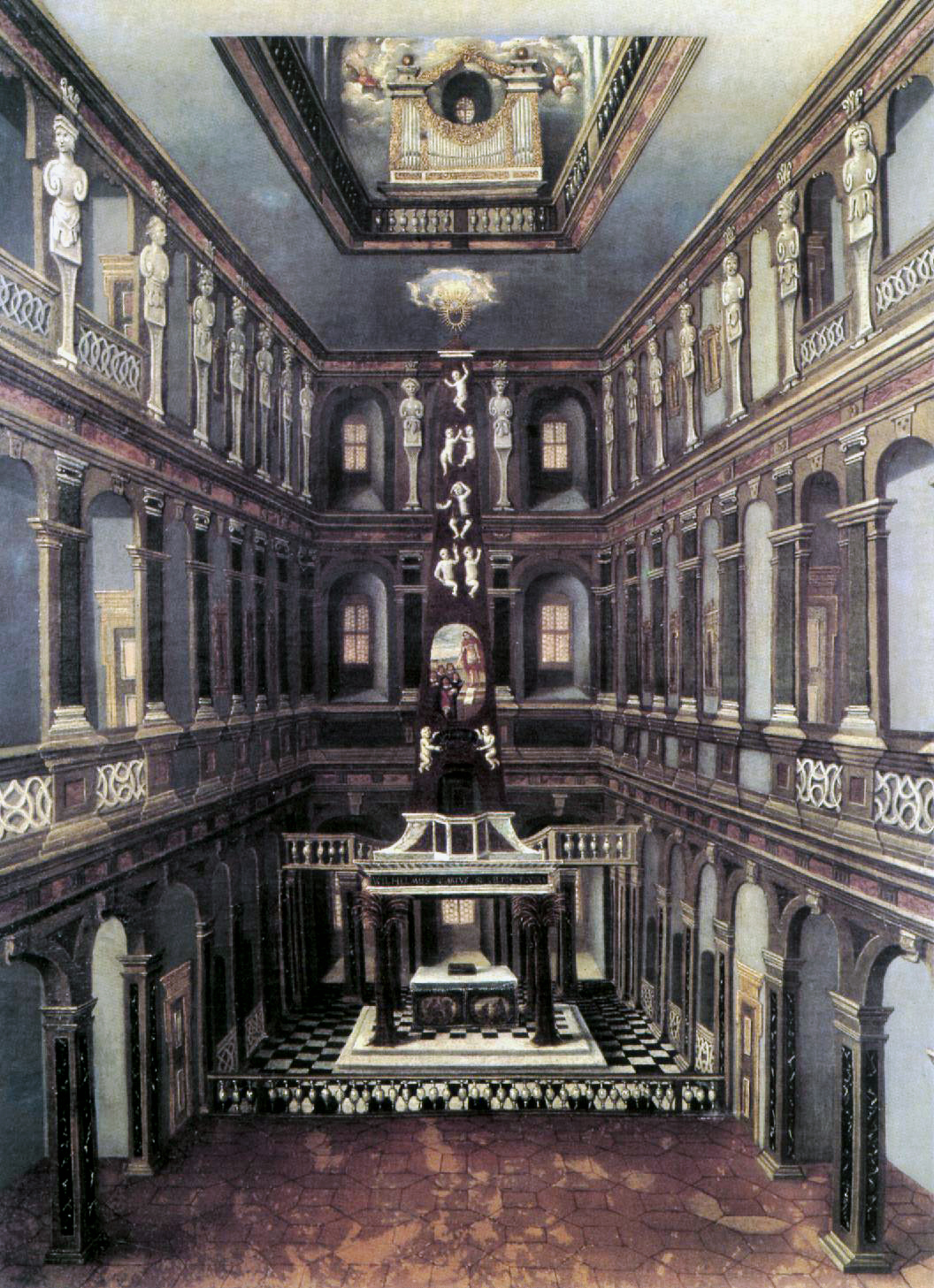
- Schlosskirche in Weimar
- Related: basis for BWV 147
- Occasion: Fourth Sunday in Advent
- Cantata text: Salomo Franck
- Composed: 1716: Weimar
- Movements: 6
- Vocal: SATB choir and solo
- Instrumental: trumpet; strings

Herz und Mund und Tat und Leben (Heart and mouth and deed and life), BWV 147.1, BWV 147a, is a cantata by Johann Sebastian Bach. He composed it in Weimar in 1716 for the fourth Sunday in Advent, 20 December. It is uncertain if the work was performed then. He later expanded the work in 1723 as Herz und Mund und Tat und Leben, BWV 147.

== History and text ==
On 2 March 1714 Bach was appointed concertmaster of the Weimar court capelle of the co-reigning dukes Wilhelm Ernst and Ernst August of Saxe-Weimar. As concertmaster, he assumed primary responsibility for composing new works, specifically cantatas for the Schlosskirche (palace church), on a monthly schedule. He likely wrote the work in 1716 for the fourth Sunday of Advent, although it may not have been performed at the time. The prescribed readings for the day were from the Epistle to the Philippians (Philippians 4:4–7) and the Gospel of John (John 1:19–28). The cantata uses a text by the court poet Salomon Franck, published in the cantata cycle Evangelische Sonn- und Fest-Tages-Andachten in 1717.

Bach's superior Drese had died on 1 December that year, and Bach seemed eager to show his capabilities by composing cantatas for three Sundays in succession, including this cantata. When he realized that not he but Drese's son would succeed as Kapellmeister, he stopped working on them. He broke up the autograph score after the first movement, and would not compose another cantata for Weimar.

== Scoring and structure ==
The work was scored for four solo voices (soprano, alto, tenor, and bass) and a four-part choir. As the music is now lost, the cantata's instrumentation is unclear, but was likely similar to BWV 147. The piece has six movements:

1. Chorus: Herz und Mund und Tat und Leben
2. Aria: Schäme dich, o Seele nicht
3. Aria: Hilf, Jesu, hilf, dass ich auch dich bekenne
4. Aria: Bereite dir, Jesu, noch heute die Bahn
5. Aria: Laß mich der Rufer Stimme hören
6. Chorale: Dein Wort laß mich bekennen

The opening chorus is elaborate, focused on the theme that the Christian is to be a witness of Jesus, as John the Baptist was, with all his being. The movement begins with an expanded instrumental concerto in which a trumpet fanfare is responded to by the strings. The ritornello is played with interwoven vocal parts and finally repeated as in the beginning.

The first of four arias is for alto, possibly accompanied by an obbligato viola. Movement 3 is an aria for tenor and continuo. Movement 4 is an aria for soprano with an obbligato solo violin.

Movement 5, a bass aria, alludes again to the Baptist who in turn referred to Isaiah. The voice is accompanied by an obbligato trumpet and strings, reminiscent of the opening movement.

The final movement is a chorale of which Franck submitted only two lines. The continuation was found in a contemporary hymnal.

When Bach expanded the cantata, he probably used the same opening movement, the first aria as movement 3, the second as movement 7, the third as movement 5, and the fourth with a new text as movement 9. The closing chorale was not used in the later work.
