= Goofing-Off Suite =

Studio album by Pete Seeger
- Released: 1955
- Genre: Folk
- Label: Folkways Records

Goofing-Off Suite is a studio album by Pete Seeger. It was originally released in 1955 on Folkways Records with a 10-inch format. The album contains music adapted from the classical, folk and popular genres, with Seeger urging in the liner notes that musicians should "swipe music from different genres to break down musical barriers and expand musical horizons".

Instruments used in the recording include: banjo, guitar, mandolin and chalil. The first half of the album features adaptations, for banjo, of classical works, with the second half containing more traditional folk. The album is predominantly instrumental, but Seeger does add some yodelling, whistling, humming and singing (in German and English) to a few tracks.

The album was reissued on 12-inch vinyl by Smithsonian Folkways Recordings in 2018.

Goofing-Off Suite was featured in the Coen brothers 1987 comedy Raising Arizona.

== Track listing ==
All tracks are written by Pete Seeger, except where noted.

No.	Title	Length
1.	"Opening Theme"	1:09
2.	"Cindy"	0:54
3.	"Blue Skies"	2:23
4.	"The Girl I Left Behind" (Traditional)	1:13
5.	"Jesu, Joy of Man's Desiring"	1:00
6.	"Duet from Beethoven's Symphony No. 7"	2:04
7.	"Chorale from Beethoven's Symphony No. 9"	1:24
8.	"Russian Folk Themes and Yodel"	2:10
9.	"Anitra's Dance/Brandy Leave Me Alone"	1:48
10.	"Opening Theme (Reprise)"	1:15
11.	"Mexican Blues"	1:57
12.	"Time's A-Getting Hard"	2:20
13.	"Barrel of Money Blues" (aka "Empty Pocket Blues" co-written with Lee Hays)	1:29
14.	"Sally My Dear"	3:29
15.	"Oh! Liza, Poor Gal"	1:44
16.	"Woody's Rag (Hard Work)" (Woody Guthrie)	1:27
