= Violin Concerto (Berg) =

1935 musical work by Alban Berg

- by Alban Berg
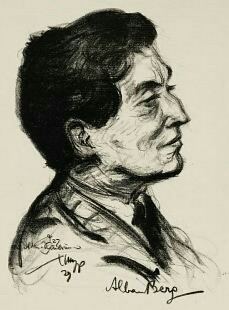
- Sketch of the composer by Emil Stumpp
- Genre: Concerto
- Composed: 1935
- Dedication: "To the memory of an angel"
- Movements: Two (in two sections each)
- Scoring: Violin and orchestra

Premiere
- Date: 19 April 1936
- Location: Palau de la Música Catalana, Barcelona
- Conductor: Hermann Scherchen
- Performers: Louis Krasner, violin; Orquestra Pau Casals

Alban Berg's Violin Concerto was written in 1935. It is probably Berg's best-known and most frequently performed piece. In it, Berg sought to reconcile diatonicism and dodecaphony. The work was commissioned by violinist Louis Krasner, and dedicated by Berg to "the memory of an angel". It was the last work he completed. Krasner performed the solo part in the premiere at the Palau de la Música Catalana, Barcelona, in April 1936, four months after the composer's death.

== Conception and composition ==
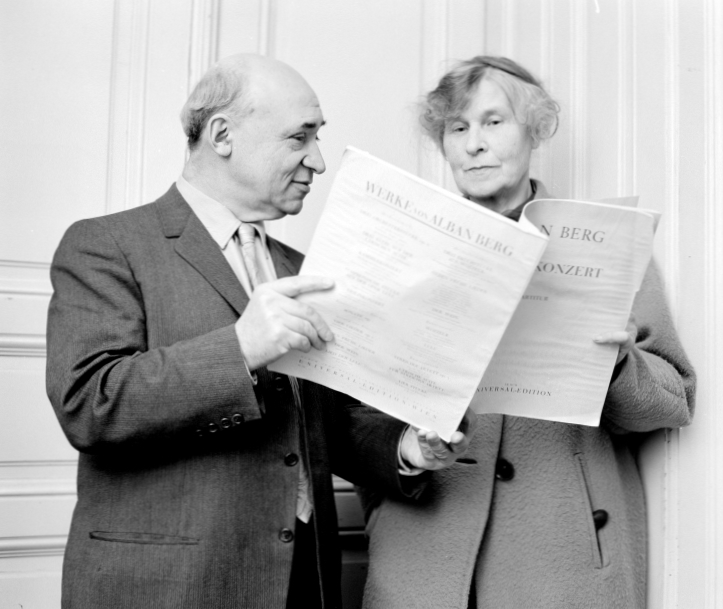
Krasner and Berg's widow Helene with the score (1961)

The piece stemmed from a commission from the violinist Louis Krasner. When he received the commission, Berg was working on his opera Lulu, and did not begin work on the concerto for some months.

After the death by polio of 18-year-old Manon Gropius, the daughter of architect Walter Gropius and Berg's friend and patron Alma Mahler (Gustav Mahler's widow), Berg set Lulu aside to write the concerto, which he dedicated "to the memory of an angel"; he identified the "angel" to Alma as Manon. Alma had felt abandoned by the Bergs in her time of mourning, and Berg was eager to repair the breach. He sent Alma some part of the score, possibly the dedicatory page and opening, in 1935. It was her 56th birthday, to which the opening metronome marking (56 to a quarter note) likely referred.

The concerto was the last work Berg completed. He worked on the piece very quickly, completing it in a few months; it is thought that his work on the concerto was largely responsible for his failing to complete Lulu before his death on 24 December 1935. In a letter to Krasner dated 16 July 1935, Berg wrote: "Yesterday I finished the composition [without the orchestration] of our Violin Concerto. I am probably more surprised by it than you will be ... the work gave me more and more joy. I hope – no, I have the confident belief – that I have succeeded."

The manuscript score carries the date 11 August 1935.

== Scoring ==
The concerto is scored for 2 flutes (both doubling piccolo), 2 oboes (one doubling cor anglais), alto saxophone (doubling as third clarinet), 2 clarinets, bass clarinet, 2 bassoons, contrabassoon, 4 horns, 2 trumpets, 2 trombones, tuba, timpani, percussion, harp, strings and solo violin.

== Music ==
External audio
- Performed by Isabelle Faust with the Orchestra Mozart under Claudio Abbado
- I. Andante – Allegretto
- II. Allegro – Adagio

Berg described the structure of the concerto in a letter to Arnold Schoenberg. It is in two movements, each divided into two sections:

1. a. Andante (Prelude)

b. Allegretto (Scherzo)

2. a. Allegro (Cadenza)

b. Adagio (Chorale Variations)

The work begins with an Andante in classical sonata form, followed by the Allegretto, a dance-like section. The second movement starts with an Allegro largely based on a single recurring rhythmic cell; this section has been described as cadenza-like, with very difficult passages in the solo part. The orchestration becomes rather violent at its climax (marked in the score as "High point of the Allegro"); the fourth and final section, marked Adagio, is much calmer. The first two sections are meant to represent life, the last two death and transfiguration.

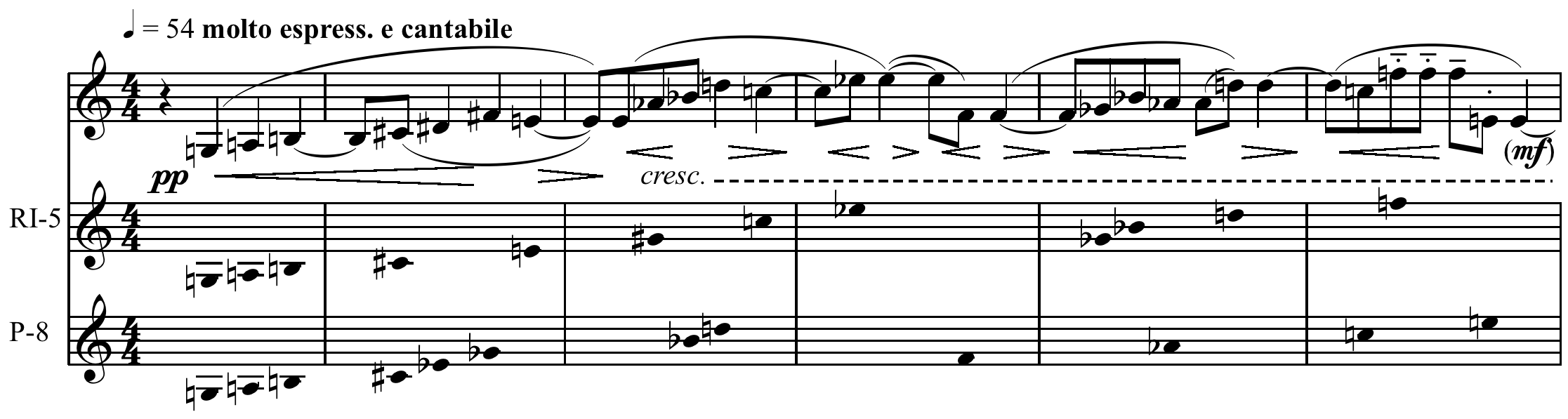
"Lament" melody and its construction from the pitches of RI-5 and P-8

Like many of Berg's works, the piece combines the twelve-tone technique learned from his teacher Arnold Schoenberg with passages written in a freer, more tonal style. Here is Berg's twelve-tone row:

Although this contains all twelve notes of the chromatic scale, there is a strong tonal undercurrent: the first three notes of the row make up a G minor triad; notes three to five are a D major triad; notes five to seven are an A minor triad; notes seven to nine are an E major triad;

and the last four notes (B, C♯, E♭, F) and the first (G) together make up part of a whole tone scale. The roots of the four triads correspond to the open strings of the violin, which is highlighted in the opening passage of the piece.

The resulting triads are thus fifth-related and form a cadence, which we hear directly before the row is played by the violin for the first time. Moreover, the four chords above contain the note sequence B (B♭) – A – C – H (B♮), the BACH motif, thus connecting the piece to Johann Sebastian Bach, whose music plays a crucial role in the piece.

The row's last four notes, ascending whole tones, are also the first four notes of the chorale melody "Es ist genug" ("It is enough"). Bach composed a four-part setting of the hymn by Franz Joachim Burmeister with a melody by Johann Rudolph Ahle to conclude his cantata O Ewigkeit, du Donnerwort, BWV 60 (O eternity, you thunderous word). The first four measures are shown below.

Berg quotes this chorale in the last movement of the piece, where Bach's harmonization is heard in the clarinets.

In 1957, Ernst Krenek identified another quoted tonal passage in the work as a Carinthian folk song. (Note: Herwig Knaus later did the same, without reference to Krenek, in "Die Kärtner Volkweise aus Alban Bergs Violinkonzert". Mosco Carner translated Knaus's work on this, including the text of the song, into English.) Bryan Simms and Charlotte Erwin described it, "A Vögele af'n Zweschpm-bam", (Note: "A birdie on the plum tree") as a "yodeling song with a saucy, ribald text". It appears in the second section of the first movement and returns briefly before the coda in the second movement. This is perhaps the only section that does not derive its materials from the row.

Anthony Pople calls the concerto "less serial than Lulu", containing originally serial material later repeated or developed outside that framework, in addition to small adjustments throughout to avoid bare octaves.

== Premieres ==
- World premiere: 19 April 1936, Palau de la Música Catalana, Barcelona, at the 1936 International Society for Contemporary Music Festival. Louis Krasner played the solo part, accompanied by the Pau Casals Orchestra under Hermann Scherchen.
  Anton Webern was intended to be the conductor. Reports vary as to whether he was ill or was emotionally unable to cope with the subject matter of the music. In any case, Scherchen happened to be there for the Festival, and he was drafted at the literal 11th hour: the first time he ever saw the score was at 11 pm the night before the premiere, and the next morning there was time for only half an hour rehearsal.
- British private premiere: 1 May 1936, London, at an invitation-only concert. Krasner was again the soloist (at the invitation of the BBC producer Edward Clark, who had attended the world premiere in Barcelona), and Webern conducted the BBC Symphony Orchestra. This performance was recorded on acetate discs, which survived in Krasner's collection. The performance was broadcast on the BBC on Berg's centenary, 9 February 1985 and later released on CD.
- Austrian and European premiere: 25 October 1936, Vienna, Krasner with the Vienna Philharmonic under Otto Klemperer. The violinist Arnold Rosé came out of retirement to lead the string section. This performance was also recorded.
- British public premiere: 9 December 1936, London, at the Queen's Hall in a BBC concert. Krasner was again the soloist, and Sir Henry Wood conducted the BBC Symphony Orchestra.

=== Revised version ===
Berg did not have time to review the score or correct any errors. This was finally done in the 1990s by Douglas Jarman, Principal Lecturer in Academic Studies at the Royal Northern College of Music, Manchester. The premiere of the revised version was given in Vienna in 1996, with Daniel Hope as soloist. Hope also made the first recording of this version, in 2004 with the BBC Symphony Orchestra under Paul Watkins.

== Jerome Robbins's "In Memory of..." ==
In 1985, the New York City Ballet premiered In Memory of..., a setting of the concerto choreographed by Jerome Robbins, with Suzanne Farrell in the central role.
