= Ich glaube, lieber Herr, hilf meinem Unglauben, BWV 109 =

Church cantata by Johann Sebastian Bach

Ich glaube, lieber Herr, hilf meinem Unglauben
- BWV 109
- Church cantata by Johann Sebastian Bach
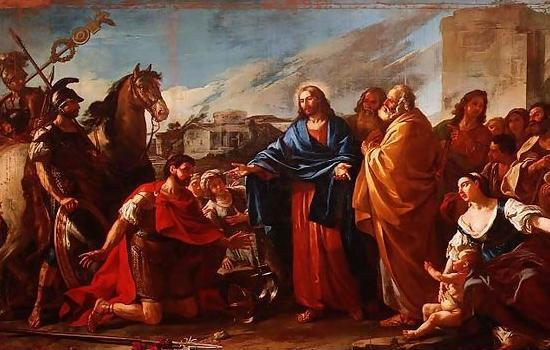
- Healing the royal official's son by Joseph-Marie Vien, 1752
- Occasion: 21st Sunday after Trinity
- Bible text: Mark 9:24
- Chorale: by Lazarus Spengler
- Performed: 17 October 1723: Leipzig
- Movements: 6
- Vocal: SATB choir; alto and tenor soloists
- Instrumental: corno da caccia; 2 oboes; 2 violins; viola; continuo

Johann Sebastian Bach composed the church cantata Ich glaube, lieber Herr, hilf meinem Unglauben (I believe, dear Lord, help my unbelief), BWV 109, in Leipzig for the 21st Sunday after Trinity and first performed it on 17 October 1723.

== History and words ==
Bach wrote the cantata in 1723 during his first year in Leipzig for the 21st Sunday after Trinity. The prescribed readings for the Sunday were from Paul's Epistle to the Ephesians, "take unto you the whole armour of God" (Ephesians 6:10–17), and from the Gospel of John, the healing of the nobleman's son (John 4:46–54). The unknown poet of the cantata text stressed the faith, which made the healing possible. The cantata opens with a quote from the Gospel of Mark, The possessed boy, Mark's rendition of the gospel (Mark 9:24). The following movements almost form a dialogue between fear and hope, or belief and doubt, such as Bach would compose three weeks later in O Ewigkeit, du Donnerwort, BWV 60, and again for Easter of 1724 in Erfreut euch, ihr Herzen, BWV 66. Movement 2 is a dialogue, movement 3 the expression of fear, movements 4 and 5 turn to hope. The closing chorale is verse 7 of "Durch Adams Fall ist ganz verderbt" by Lazarus Spengler (1524).

Bach first performed the cantata on 17 October 1723.

== Scoring and structure ==
The cantata in six movements is scored for alto and tenor soloists, a four-part choir, and a Baroque instrumental ensemble of cor du chasse (corno da caccia or corno da tirarsi), two oboes, two violins, viola, and basso continuo. The cor du chasse is possibly the same instrument as the slide trumpet used a week before in the performance in Leipzig of the cantata Ach! ich sehe, itzt, da ich zur Hochzeit gehe, BWV 162, written in Weimar. Its added part is not in the score. In the opening chorus it plays mostly colla parte with the first violin, in movement 6 the cantus firmus with the soprano.

1. Chorus: Ich glaube, lieber Herr, hilf meinem Unglauben
2. Recitative (tenor): Des Herren Hand ist ja noch nicht verkürzt
3. Aria (tenor, strings): Wie zweifelhaftig ist mein Hoffen
4. Recitative (alto): O fasse dich, du zweifelhafter Mut
5. Aria (alto, oboes): Der Heiland kennet ja die Seinen
6. Chorale: Wer hofft in Gott und dem vertraut

== Music ==
The opening chorus shows many elements of a concerto grosso. In the instrumental ritornello, oboe 1 and violin 1 form the concertino. The vocal parts appear sometimes as a solo or duet, expressing belief in an upward theme derived from the ritornello theme, with doubt expressed in a downward line.

The inner dialogue in movement 2 is marked forte and piano, rather than giving the words to two different singers, as John Eliot Gardiner points out: "Bach reinforces the dichotomy between faith and doubt by assigning two opposing voices sung by the same singer, one marked forte, the other piano, alternating phrase by phrase and surely unique in Bach's recitatives". The final question "Ach Herr, wie lange?" (Ah, Lord, how long?) is intensified as an arioso, marked adagio. In the following aria fear is expressed, according to Gardiner, in "jagged melodic shapes, unstable harmonies headed towards anguished second inversion chords, and persistent dotted rhythmic figures". It has been compared to the tenor aria from Bach's St John Passion, Ach, mein Sinn.

The closing chorale is not a four-part setting, but a complex chorale fantasia with an independent orchestral part, in which the choral part is embedded. The lines of the chorale melody "Durch Adams Fall ist ganz verderbt", interspersed by interludes, are sung in long notes by the soprano (with the corno) on a foundation of faster movement in the lower voices. This movement is the first chorale fantasia written in a Bach cantata in Leipzig, to be followed by many such movements opening chorale cantatas of the second cantata cycle.

== Recordings ==
- Die Bach Kantate Vol. 56, Helmuth Rilling, Gächinger Kantorei, Bach-Collegium Stuttgart, Gabriele Schreckenbach, Kurt Equiluz, Hänssler (LP) 1971
- J. S. Bach: Das Kantatenwerk – Sacred Cantatas Vol. 6, Nikolaus Harnoncourt, Tölzer Knabenchor, Concentus Musicus Wien, Paul Esswood, Kurt Equiluz, Teldec 1980
- Die Bach Kantate Vol. 56, Helmuth Rilling, Gächinger Kantorei, Bach-Collegium Stuttgart, Hildegard Laurich, Kurt Equiluz, Hänssler (CD) 1981
- J. S. Bach: Complete Cantatas Vol. 8, Ton Koopman, Amsterdam Baroque Orchestra & Choir, Bogna Bartosz, Jörg Dürmüller, Antoine Marchand 1994
- J. S. Bach: Cantatas Vol. 14 – Cantatas from Leipzig 1723, Masaaki Suzuki, Bach Collegium Japan, Robin Blaze, Gerd Türk, BIS 2000
- Bach Cantatas Vol. 11, John Eliot Gardiner, Monteverdi Choir, English Baroque Soloists, William Towers, Paul Agnew, Soli Deo Gloria 2000

== Sources ==
- Ich glaube, lieber Herr, hilf meinem Unglauben, BWV 109: Scores at the International Music Score Library Project
- Ich glaube, lieber Herr, hilf meinem Unglauben BWV 109; BC A 151 / Sacred cantata (21st Sunday after Trinity) Bach Digital
- Cantata BWV 109 Ich glaube, lieber Herr, hilf meinem Unglauben history, scoring, sources for text and music, translations to various languages, discography, discussion, Bach Cantatas Website
- BWV 109 Ich glaube, lieber Herr, hilf meinem Unglauben English translation, University of Vermont
- BWV 109 Ich glaube, lieber Herr, hilf meinem Unglauben text, scoring, University of Alberta
- Chapter 23 BWV 109 Ich glaube, lieber Herr, hilf meinem Unglauben Julian Mincham 2010
