= Gottfried Scheidt =

German composer

Gottfried Scheidt (20 September 1593 – 3 June 1661) was a German composer and organist.

Born in Halle, he moved to Amsterdam in 1611 to study with Jan Pieterszoon Sweelinck, returning home in 1615 to further study with his older brother Samuel Scheidt and others. He was appointed organist to the Altenburg court in 1617, and held the post until his retirement on 5 May 1658. He was successful and respected, and aside from playing the organ, directed the newly founded Hofkapelle, despite the strictures of the Thirty Years' War. He was unsuccessful in his application, in 1622/1623, for the post of principal organist of the Marienkirche in Danzig, which his brother had declined and which eventually went to Paul Siefert.

His only known organ compositions are in a set of variations on "Allein Gott in der Höh sei Ehr" made collaboratively in 1614 by Sweelinck and others; the six variations include three by Scheidt and three anonymous, which may be by him; this work belongs to the tradition of the North German school. Modern editions are found by H.J. Moser (Kassel, 1953), and G. Gerdes, in 46 Choräle für Orgel von J.P. Sweelinck und seinen deutschen Schülern (Mainz, 1957).

His other compositions are all occasional vocal works: Pia vota et hortulanae devotionis amicor, a wedding aria (1646); Selig sind die Toten, funeral music for Sophie Elisabeth, Duchess of Brunswick-Lüneburg (Leipzig, 1650); another funeral work (1620), in S. Scheidt: Gesamtausgabe IV, ed. G. Harms (Klecken, 1933); and two works in Cantionale sacrum III (Gotha, 1648), in Schatz des liturgischen Chor- und Gemeindegesangs III, ed. L. Schoeberlein (Göttingen, 1872).

== Sources ==
- Literature by and about Gottfried Scheidt in the German National Library catalogue
- Nigel Fortune, 'Scheidt, Gottfried', Grove Music Online ed. L. Macy (Accessed 2007-06-08)
- C. Mahrenholz: Samuel Scheidt: sein Leben und Werk (Leipzig, 1924)
