= O Ewigkeit, du Donnerwort, BWV 20 =

Church cantata by Johann Sebastian Bach

O Ewigkeit, du Donnerwort
- BWV 20
- Chorale cantata by J. S. Bach
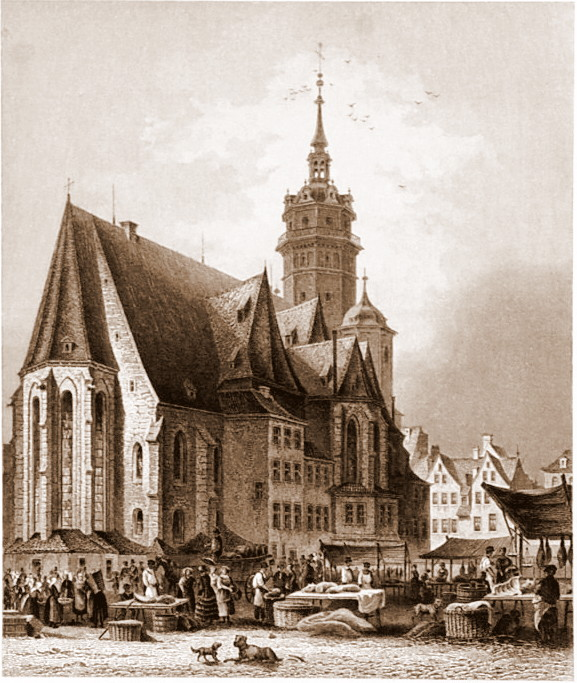
- Nikolaikirche, c. 1850
- Occasion: First Sunday after Trinity
- Chorale: "O Ewigkeit, du Donnerwort" by Johann Rist
- Performed: 11 June 1724: Leipzig
- Movements: 11 in two parts (7, 4)
- Vocal: SATB choir; solo: alto, tenor and bass
- Instrumental: tromba da tirarsi; 3 oboes; 2 violins; viola; continuo

Johann Sebastian Bach composed the church cantata O Ewigkeit, du Donnerwort (O eternity, you word of thunder), BWV 20, in Leipzig for the first Sunday after Trinity, which fell on 11 June in 1724. Bach composed it when beginning his second year as Thomaskantor in Leipzig. It is the first cantata he composed for his second annual cycle which was planned to contain chorale cantatas, each based on a Lutheran hymn. The cantata is focused on Johann Rist's 1642 hymn "O Ewigkeit, du Donnerwort", with a chorale melody by Johann Schop. The topic of death and eternity matches the Gospel for the Sunday, the parable of the Rich man and Lazarus.

As usual for Bach's chorale cantatas to come in the cycle, selected hymn stanzas were retained while the others were paraphrased by a contemporary poet who transformed their ideas into a sequence of alternating recitatives and arias. For this cantata, the first stanza was used unchanged, and two more stanzas to conclude the cantata's two parts. The first part was performed before the sermon, the second part after the sermon. The first part is in seven movements, and the second part is in four movements.

Bach scored the cantata for three vocal soloists, a four-part choir and a Baroque instrumental ensemble of two tromba da tirarsi, three oboes, two violins, viola and basso continuo. Schop's chorale melody appears in the movements with the original text, the opening chorale fantasia and the (identical) four-part harmonisation closing the cantata's two parts. All instruments play in the opening chorale fantasia, in which the soprano sings the hymn tune as a cantus firmus. It is written in the style of a solemn French Overture, opening both the cantata and the second cantata cycle.

== History and words ==
Bach composed the cantata in 1724 for the First Sunday after Trinity. The Sunday marks the beginning of the second half of the liturgical year, "in which core issues of faith and doctrine are explored". The year before, Bach had taken office as Thomaskantor in Leipzig. He was responsible for the education of the Thomanerchor, performances in the regular services in the Thomaskirche, the Nikolaikirche and others. During his first year, he started composing one cantata for each Sunday and holiday of the liturgical year, termed by the Bach scholar Christoph Wolff as "an artistic undertaking on the largest scale". In 1724, Bach began exclusively composing chorale cantatas for his second annual cantata cycle, beginning with this cantata and totaling some 40 chorale cantatas by the end of the cycle. Each cantata was based on the main Lutheran hymn for the respective occasion. Leipzig had a tradition of focusing on the hymns. In 1690, the pastor of the Thomaskirche, Johann Benedikt Carpzov, announced that he would preach also on songs and that Johann Schelle, then the director of music, would play the song before the sermon.

The prescribed readings for the Sunday were from the First Epistle of John, "God is Love" (1 John 4:16–21), and from the Gospel of Luke, the parable of the Rich man and Lazarus (Luke 16:19–31). The text is based on Johann Rist's hymn "O Ewigkeit, du Donnerwort", which was published in the collection Himlische Lieder (Heavenly songs) in Lüneburg in 1642. The text is based on 12 of the hymn's 16 stanzas. The hymn, reflecting death and eternity, corresponds well to the parable of the rich man who has to face death and hell. It is subtitled "Ernstliche Betrachtung der unendlichen Ewigkeit" (A serious consideration of endless eternity). The text of three stanzas (stanzas 1, 8 and 12, used for movements 1, 7 and 11) is kept unchanged. An unknown author rephrased the other stanzas of the chorale to recitatives and arias, generally alternating and using one stanza for one cantata movement. The poet combined two stanzas, 4 and 5, to form movement 4. He used the lines "Vielleicht ist dies der letzte Tag, kein Mensch weiß, wenn er sterben mag" (Perhaps this is your last day, no one knows when he might die) from stanza 9 in movement 9 which is otherwise based on stanza 10. In movement 10, he inserted a hint at the Gospel. Overall, the poet stayed close to the hymn's text, which is characteristic for the early cantatas in Bach's second annual cycle. The poet was possibly Andreas Stübel, who died in 1725, which would explain why Bach did not complete the full cycle, but ended on Palm Sunday.

The chorale theme was composed by Johann Schop for the hymn "Wach auf, mein Geist, erhebe dich", which appeared in the collection Himlische Lieder. It was assigned to the text by Johann Franck in his 1653 edition of Praxis pietatis melica. The tune is featured in all three movements which use Rist's original text.

Bach first performed the cantata on 11 June 1724.

== Music ==
=== Structure and scoring ===
Bach structured the cantata in two parts. Part I contains seven movements and is to be performed before the sermon while Part II has four movements and is to be performed after the sermon. Part I begins with a chorale fantasia, and both parts are concluded by the same four-part setting of two other stanzas of the chorale. The inner movements are mostly alternating recitatives and arias, with the last aria a duet. Bach scored the work festively for three vocal soloists (alto (A), tenor (T) and bass (B)), a four-part choir (SATB), and a Baroque instrumental ensemble: tromba da tirarsi (slide trumpet, Tt), three oboes (Ob), two violins (Vl), viola (Va), and basso continuo (Bc). Alfred Dürr gave the cantata's duration as 31 minutes.

In the following table of the movements, the scoring follows the Neue Bach-Ausgabe. The keys and time signatures are taken from Dürr, using the symbol for common time (4/4). The instruments are shown separately for winds and strings, while the continuo, playing throughout, is not shown.

Movements of O Ewigkeit, du Donnerwort, Part I
No.	Title	Text	Type	Vocal	Winds	Strings	Key	Time
1	O Ewigkeit, du Donnerwort	Rist	Chorale fantasia	SATB	Tt 3Ob	2Vl Va	F major	3/4
2	Kein Unglück ist in aller Welt zu finden	anon.	Recitative	T				common time
3	Ewigkeit, du machst mir bange	anon.	Aria	T		2Vl Va	C minor	3/4
4	Gesetzt, es dau'rte der Verdammten Qual	anon.	Recitative	B				common time
5	Gott ist gerecht in seinen Werken	anon.	Aria	B	3Ob			
6	O Mensch, errette deine Seele	anon.	Aria	A		2Vl Va	D minor	3/4
7	Solang ein Gott im Himmel lebt	Rist	Chorale	SATB	Tt 3Ob	2Vl Va	F major	common time

Movements of O Ewigkeit, du Donnerwort, Part II
No.	Title	Text	Type	Vocal	Winds	Strings	Key	Time
8	Wacht auf, wacht auf, verlornen Schafe	anon.	Aria	B	Tt 3Ob	2Vl Va	C major	common time
9	Verlaß, o Mensch, die Wollust dieser Welt	anon.	Recitative	A				common time
10	O Menschenkind, hör auf geschwind	anon.	Duet aria	A T			A minor	3/4
11	O Ewigkeit, du Donnerwort	Rist	Chorale	SATB	Tt 3Ob	2Vl Va	F major	common time

=== Movements ===
The opening chorus, beginning not only the cantata but also the second annual cantata cycle, is in the style of a solemn French Overture in the typical three sections slow – fast (vivace) – slow. The French Overture was designed to mark the entry of the king. The melody is sung by the soprano as a cantus firmus in long notes, doubled by the slide trumpet. The chorale is in bar form. The first Stollen of three lines is handled in the slow section, the second Stollen of lines 4 to 6 in the fast section, the Abgesang of lines 7 an 8 in the concluding slow section. The lower voices are mostly in homophony. The development of themes happens in the orchestra. The rising theme of the slow section in dotted rhythm is derived from the beginning of the chorale tune, whereas the theme of the fast section is not related to the tune. The fast section is not a strict fugue. Bach uses a number of musical illustrations to complement the text: "Ewigkeit" (eternity) is rendered in long notes in the lower voices and the instruments; "Donnerwort" (thunderous word) appears as a sudden change to short notes with a melisma in the bass; on the words "große Traurigkeit" (great sadness), a downward chromatic line from the instrumental counterpoint in the fast section also appears in the voices; "erschrocken" (terrified) is rendered in jarred rhythms interrupted by rests, first in the orchestra, then also in the voices; "klebt" (cleave) is a long note in the voices. John Eliot Gardiner, who conducted the Bach Cantata Pilgrimage in 2000, summarised: "Confronted by the baffling and disquieting subject of eternity, and specifically the eternity of hell, Bach is fired up as never before".

The recitatives are mostly secco, with an arioso only in movement 9 on the words "Pracht, Hoffart, Reichtum, Ehr, und Geld" (splendor, pride, riches, honor, and wealth) from the chorale. The arias, by contrast, interpret the text in its affekt and in single phrases. Gardiner notes the following about the first pair of recitative and aria:

The tenor prolongs the mood of torment ... ramming home the themes of anxiety, pain, hell and the quaking heart. Bach uses a varied thematic armoury: long notes and undulating quavers to suggest eternity, chains of appoggiaturas stretched over tortuous figurations to suggest fear, wild runs for flames and burning, broken fragments, chromatic and syncopated, for the quaking heart. Sudden silences at phrase-ends add to the sense of disjointedness and terror. Yet all this profligacy of dramatic imagery is perfectly and seamlessly integrated into the overall design.

In movement 8, the call to wake up is intensified by trumpet signals and fast scales, evoking the Last Judgement. The first motif in movement 10 is sung by the two singers of the duet on the words O Menschenkind ("o child of man") and are repeated instrumentally as a hint of that warning. Both parts of the cantata are concluded by the same four-part chorale setting, asking finally "Nimm du mich, wenn es dir gefällt, Herr Jesu, in dein Freudenzelt!" (Take me, Jesus, if you will, into the felicity of your tent).

== Recordings ==
The entries of the following table are taken from the list of recordings provided on the Bach Cantatas Website. Ensembles playing on period instruments in historically informed performance and a choir of one voice per part (OVPP) are marked by green background.

Recordings of O Ewigkeit, du Donnerwort
Title	Conductor / Choir / Orchestra	Soloists	Label	Year	Choir type	Orch. type
Die Bach Kantate Vol. 39	Helmuth Rilling Frankfurter Kantorei Bach-Collegium Stuttgart	Verena Gohl; Theo Altmeyer; Wolfgang Schöne	Hänssler	1970		
J. S. Bach: Das Kantatenwerk • Complete Cantatas • Les Cantates, Folge / Vol. 5	Nikolaus Harnoncourt: Wiener Sängerknaben; Chorus Viennensis; Concentus Musicus Wien	Paul Esswood; Kurt Equiluz; Max van Egmond	Teldec	1972		Period
J. S. Bach: Complete Cantatas Vol. 10	Ton Koopman Amsterdam Baroque Orchestra & Choir	Michael Chance; Paul Agnew; Klaus Mertens	Antoine Marchand	1998		Period
Bach Edition Vol. 18 – Cantatas Vol. 9	Pieter Jan Leusink Holland Boys Choir Netherlands Bach Collegium	Sytse Buwalda; Knut Schoch; Bas Ramselaar	Brilliant Classics	2000		Period
Bach Cantatas Vol. 1: City of London / For the 1st Sunday after Trinity	John Eliot Gardiner Monteverdi Choir English Baroque Soloists	Wilke te Brummelstroete; Paul Agnew; Dietrich Henschel	Soli Deo Gloria	2000		Period
J. S. Bach: Cantatas for the First and Second Sundays After Trinity	Craig Smith Chorus and orchestra of Emmanuel Music	Pamela Dellal; Gerald Gray; David Markovitz	Koch International	2001		
J. S. Bach: Cantatas Vol. 8 – Leipzig Cantatas	Masaaki Suzuki Bach Collegium Japan	Robin Blaze; Jan Kobow; Peter Kooy	BIS	2002		Period
J. S. Bach: "O Ewigkeit du Donnerwort" – Cantatas BWV 2, 20 & 176	Philippe Herreweghe Collegium Vocale Gent	Ingeborg Danz; Jan Kobow; Peter Kooy	Harmonia Mundi France	2002		Period
J. S. Bach: Cantatas for the Complete Liturgical Year Vol. 7 Cantatas BWV 20 · 2 · 10	Sigiswald Kuijken La Petite Bande	Siri Thornhill; Petra Noskaiová; Marcus Ullmann; Jan van der Crabben	Accent	2007	OVPP	Period

== Bibliography ==
General

- "O Ewigkeit, du Donnerwort BWV 20; BC A 95 / Chorale cantata (1st Sunday after Trinity)". Bach Digital. 2017.

Books

- Dürr, Alfred; Jones, Richard D. P. (2006). "O Ewigkeit, du Donnerwort, BWV 20". The Cantatas of J. S. Bach: With Their Librettos in German-English Parallel Text. Oxford University Press. pp. 30–32, 387–392. ISBN 978-0-19-929776-4.
- Wolff, Christoph (1991). Bach: Essays on his Life and Music. Harvard University Press. ISBN 978-0-67-405926-9.

Online sources

- Braatz, Thomas; Oron, Aryeh (2005). "Chorale Melodies used in Bach's Vocal Works / O Ewigkeit, du Donnerwort". Bach Cantatas Website.
- Browne, Francis (2003). "O Ewigkeit, du Donnerwort / Text and Translation of Chorale". Bach Cantatas Website.
- Dahn, Luke (2021). "BWV 20.7 & 20.11". bach-chorales.com.
- Dellal, Pamela (2017). "BWV 20 – O Ewigkeit, du Donnerwort I". Emmanuel Music.
- Gardiner, John Eliot (2004). Bach Cantatas Vol. 1: City of London (PDF) (Media notes). Soli Deo Gloria (at Hyperion Records website). p. 13.
- Hofmann, Klaus (2002). "O Ewigkeit, du Donnerwort, BWV 20 / O eternity, thou thunderous word" (PDF). Bach Cantatas Website. p. 5.
- Oron, Aryeh (2015). "Cantata BWV 20 O Ewigkeit, du Donnerwort (I)". Bach Cantatas Website.
- "Christoph Graupner / Kantate / Wacht auf ihr Todten stehet auf" (PDF) (in German). Christoph Graupner Gesellschaft.
