= Martin Janus =

German Protestant clergyman and musician (c.1620–c.1682)

- Born: c. 1620; Merseburg
- Died: c. 1682; Ohlau
- Other names: Martin Jahn, Jähn, Jan
- Education: University of Königsberg
- Occupations: Protestant minister; Church musician; Hymnwriter; Teacher; Editor

Martin Janus (also Martin Jahn, Jähn and Jan; c. 1620 – c. 1682) was a German Protestant minister, church musician, hymnwriter, teacher and editor. He wrote the lyrics of the hymn "Jesu, meiner Seelen Wonne", which became popular in the arrangement of a Bach chorale as Jesu, Joy of Man's Desiring.

== Career ==
Born in Merseburg, Janus inscribed to the University of Königsberg on 14 March 1644. He probably received musical education even before. After studying theology for several semesters, he became church musician (Kantor) in Steinau, part of the Duchy of Oppeln. During the Thirty Years' War, he had to flee because the area became Catholic again during the Counter-Reformation. Janus worked as the music director for two churches in Sorau in Lower Lusatia, probably supported by Freiherr Sigismund Seifried von Promnitz. After the death of Promnitz in 1654, Janus moved to Sagan where he became rector and musician at the municipal school (Stadtschule). C. 1664, he also became minister in the nearby Eckersdorf (now Bożnów in Sagan) He had to flee again when Duke Wenzel Eusebius von Lobkowicz made the Duchy of Sagan Catholic again, and Protestant preachers and teachers were expelled. Janus found a position as church musician in the duchy of Ohlau, where Luise of Anhalt-Dessau resided. He died in Ohlau c. 1682.

== Work ==
=== Passionale melicum ===
In 1652, Janus published a collection of 50 four-part settings of Passion-songs. It is regarded as the first collection of Passion-songs. In 1663 he published a collection of 200 songs, titled Passionale melicum. It was intended for use at home. Several songs became well-known, for example "Du großer Schmerzensmann" on a text by Adam Thebesius, which is part of the current Protestant hymnal Evangelisches Gesangbuch as EG 87.

=== Lyricist ===
Janus wrote songs himself, but only one became popular, "Jesu, meiner Seelen Wonne". It was not part of his song collections, but appeared in the hymnal Christlich Herzens Andacht in Nürnberg in 1665.

Johann Sebastian Bach used two stanzas of this hymn, with the "Werde munter, mein Gemüte" hymn tune, to close the two parts of his cantata Herz und Mund und Tat und Leben, BWV 147: for Part I the sixth stanza, "Wohl mir, daß ich Jesum habe" and for Part II the 16th stanza, "Jesus bleibet meine Freude". This chorale setting became popular in the arrangement Jesu, Joy of Man's Desiring. Gottfried Heinrich Stölzel used the 12th stanza of this hymn, "Wenn die Welt mit ihren Netzen", in his Passion oratorio Die leidende und am Creutz sterbende Liebe Jesu (1720).

== Bibliography ==
- Dürr, Alfred; Jones, Richard D. P. (2006). The Cantatas of J. S. Bach: With Their Librettos in German-English Parallel Text. Oxford University Press. pp. 673–675. ISBN 978-0-19-929776-4.
- Stölzel, Gottfried Heinrich (1741). Die leidende und am Creutz sterbende Liebe Jesu, in denen Kirchen der Stadt Göttingen zur Fasten-Zeit vorgestellt. Göttingen: Hager.
- Reinhard Tenberg (1990). "Janus, Martin". In Bautz, Friedrich Wilhelm (ed.). Biographisch-Bibliographisches Kirchenlexikon (BBKL) (in German). Vol. 2. Hamm: Bautz. cols. 1558–1559. ISBN 3-88309-032-8.
- l.u. (1881). "Janus, Martin". Allgemeine Deutsche Biographie (in German). Vol. 13. Leipzig: Duncker & Humblot. pp. 710–711.
- "Martin Janus". hymnary.org.
