= Karl Piutti =

German composer and organist

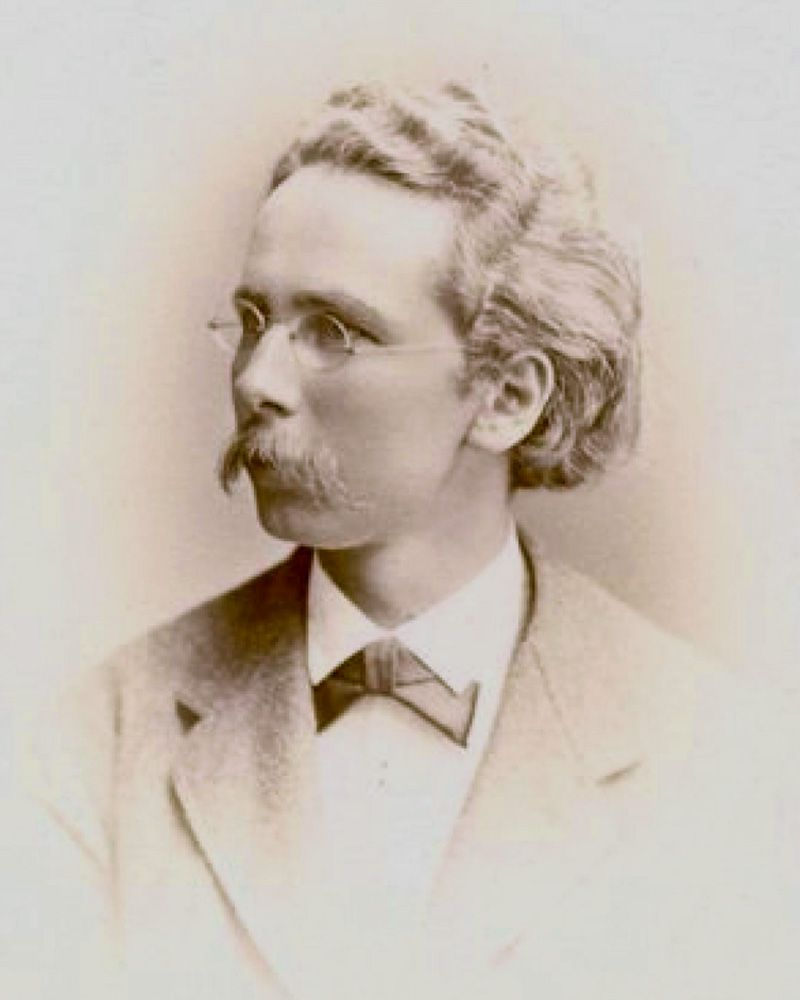
Karl Piutti

Karl Piutti (30 April 1846, Pradielis - Italy – 17 June 1902, Leipzig) was an Italian composer and organist.

Piutti studied at the Leipzig Conservatory where he studied under Robert Papperitz and Carl Reinecke. He taught at his alma mater from 1875 onwards, and also became the organist at the Thomaskirche after 1880.

His compositions comprised some two hundred preludes, a Trauungsonate (Wedding Sonata), and a piece titled Die Pfingstfeier (Pentecostal Celebration), all for organ; motets; settings of Psalms; lieder; and pieces for piano.

== Selected works ==
=== Choral ===
- Two Psalms, op. 30
  - Das ist mir lieb (Psalm 116)
  - Jauchzet dem Herrn (Psalm 100)
- Two Motets, op. 33
  - Selig sind die Toten
  - Die auf den Herrn harren

=== Organ ===
- Die Trauung, op. 9, cycle of four pieces in the form of a sonata
- 10 Improvisations on a Well-Known Chorale, op. 15
- Preludes and Fugue, op. 16 "Die Pfingstfeier"
- Fest-Hymnus, op. 20
- Organ Sonata in G major, op. 22
- Organ Sonata in E minor, op. 27
- 10 Short Pieces for Organ, op. 32
- 200 Choralvorspiele, op. 34
