= Selig sind die Toten =

Bible verse

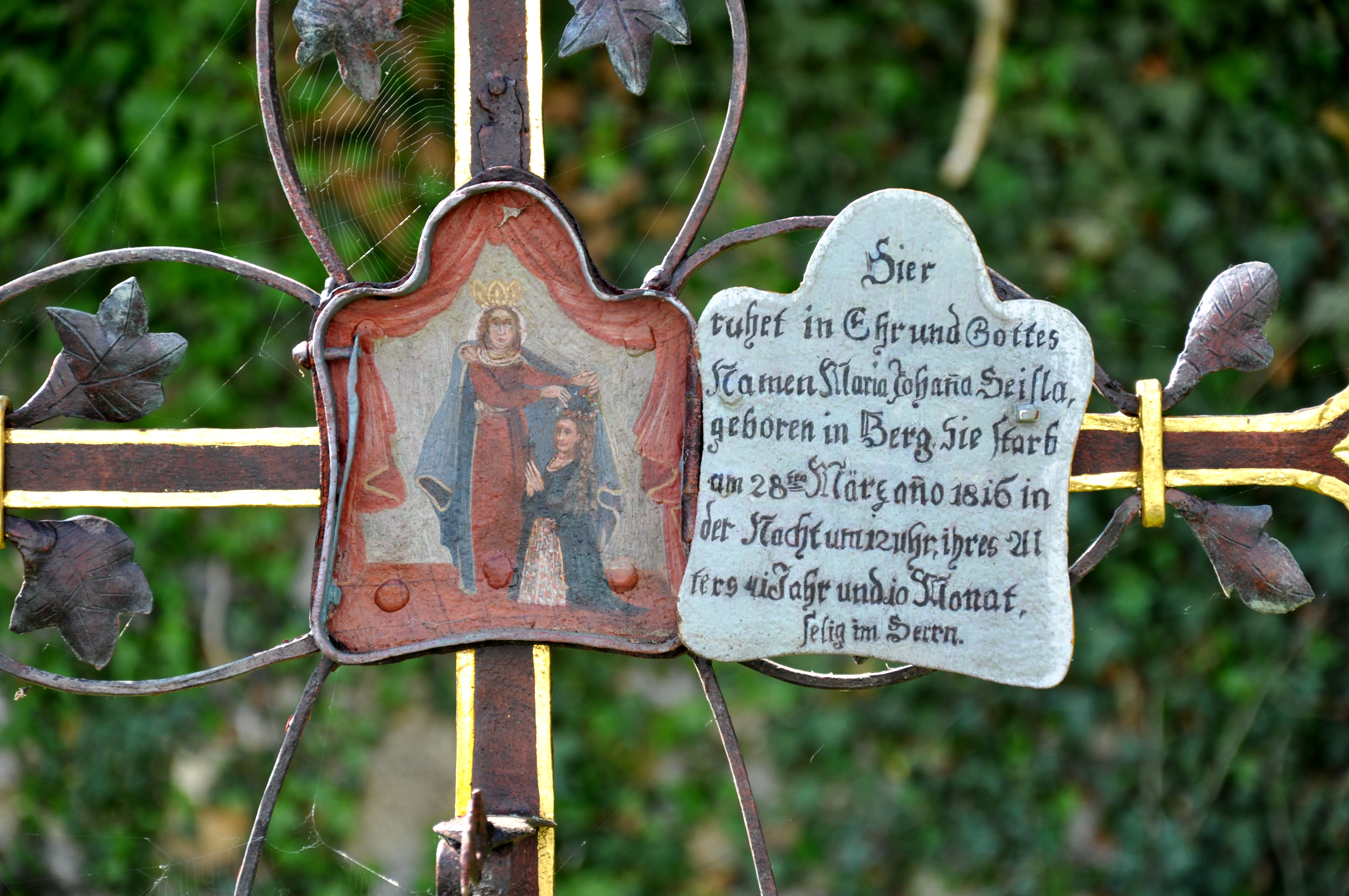
German grave cross with the text Selig im Herrn ("Blessed in the Lord")

Selig sind die Toten (English: Blessed are the dead) is the incipit of a verse from the Bible frequently used in funeral music of German-speaking composers.

The text appears in Revelation 14:13. In the Luther Bible it begins Selig sind die Toten, die in dem Herrn sterben von nun an, in English "Blessed are the dead, who die in the Lord, from henceforth" (Revelation 14:13).

The most famous settings are a six-part motet by Heinrich Schütz published in his 1648 collection Geistliche Chormusik, and the last movement of Ein deutsches Requiem by Johannes Brahms.

Other settings include those by Hugo Distler, Johann Hermann Schein, Gottfried Scheidt, Karl Piutti, Carl Philipp Emanuel Bach, Georg Philipp Telemann and Felix Mendelssohn-Bartholdy (op. 115 n. 1). Johann Sebastian Bach used the verse in a recitative of his cantata O Ewigkeit, du Donnerwort, BWV 60.
