= Constantin Christian Dedekind =

German poet, dramatist, librettist, composer and bass singer

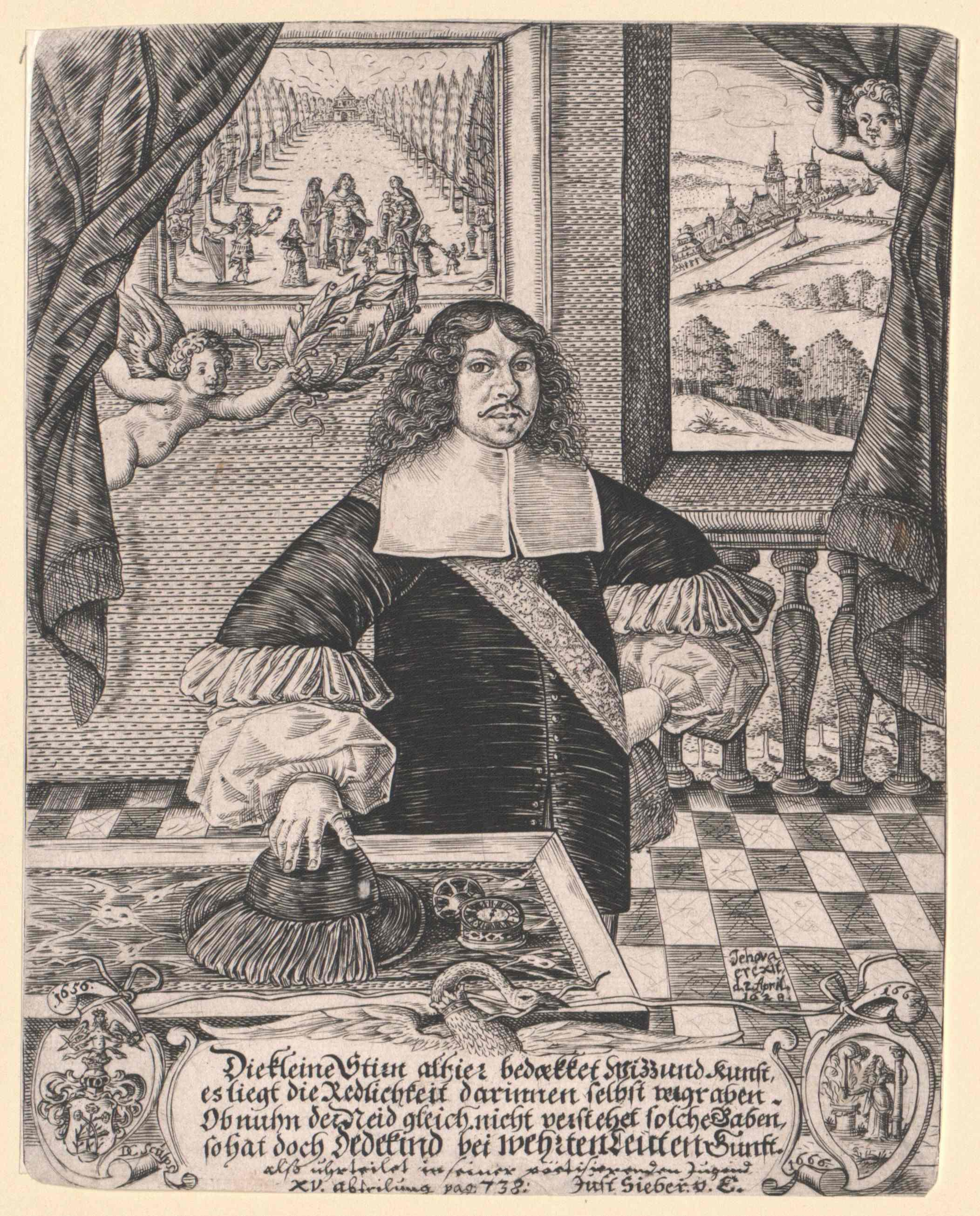
Constantin Christian Dedekind

Constantin Christian Dedekind (2 April 1628 – 1715) was a German poet, dramatist, librettist, composer and bass singer of the Baroque era.

== Biography ==
Dedekind was born in Reinsdorf, Thuringia into a musical family, the son of musician Stefan Dedekind (1595–1636) and the grandson of composer Henning Dedekind (1562–1626). He was educated at Quedlinburg Abbey. From about 1647 he lived in Dresden. Early recognition of his poetic talent came in 1652 when Johann Rist, in his role of Imperial Count Palatine, awarded him the Dichterkrone (equivalent to making him Poet Laureate). A few years later Dedekind became a member of the Elbschwanenorden (Order of Elbe Swans), Rist's poetical society.

He also pursued a musical career. From 1654 he was a bass singer in the Kapelle of Johann Georg II, Elector of Saxony in Dresden. From 1666 to 1675 he held the position of Konzertmeister there; however, he directed only the German singers within the Kapelle, a grouping referred to as the kleine deutsche Musik, as distinct from the Italian ones. He himself had requested this split in a letter of 1666 to Johann Georg II. His resignation of the position in 1675 seems to have been an eventual outcome of this rivalry. However, becoming a tax collector for the Elector enabled him to accumulate a fortune. He was also a publisher, mainly of musical scores, though not a very successful one. Dedekind's wide circle of friends in Dresden included composers such as Heinrich Albert, Adam Krieger and Heinrich Schütz, as well as poets like Johann Joseph Beckh, Michael Kongehl, Christoph Kormart and David Schirmer.

His 1657 songbook Aelbianische Musen-Lust was a large collection of musical settings of German strophic poetry, for solo voice. It featured a wide selection of poets from across Germany, including Martin Opitz, Paul Fleming, Simon Dach, Gottfried Finckelthaus, Johann Rist, David Schirmer, Andreas Tscherning and Georg Neumark, as well as Dedekind himself. He also created a very large number of sacred songs and dramas. His 1673/74 collection Musicalischer Jahrgang und Vesper-Gesang alone includes 120 sacred concertos, for two voices and continuo. The works Neue geistliche Schauspiele (1670) and Heilige Arbeit über Freud und Leid der alten und neuen Zeit (1676) were sacred collections containing operatic libretti and texts for cantatas. He counts as one of the most important German artists of his time in sacred drama. His significance in that field was emphasised by the Nuremberg poet Sigmund von Birken in his Teutschen Rede-bind- und Dicht-Kunst (1679). He and Dedekind exchanged correspondence for many years.

In 1680 the outbreak of plague caused Dedekind to flee Dresden for Meissen. In his last years he composed much less; his late work was almost entirely sacred poetry.

He was married first to Anna Elisabeth Müller and secondly to Maria Dorothea Weber. Altogether there were five children. Dedekind died in Dresden and was buried on 2 September 1715.

== Works ==
- Die Aelbianische Musen-Lust (1657 Dresden)
- Davidische Herz-Lust, das ist Singender Harfen-Klang (1669 Nuremberg)
- Neue geistliche Schauspiele (1670 Stuttgart)
- Musicalischer Jahrgang und Vesper-Gesang (1673/74)
- Heilige Arbeit über Freud und Leid der alten und neuen Zeit (1676 Dresden)

== Sources ==
- Aikin, Judith P. (2003). "Constantin Christian Dedekind: Neue geistliche Schauspiele 1670". Daphnis Zeitschrift für Mittlere Deutsche Literature und Kultur der Frühen Neuzeit (1400–1750). 32: 371–373.
- Buelow, George J (2004). A History of Baroque Music. Bloomington: Indiana University Press. ISBN 0-253-34365-8.
- Harper, Anthony J (2003). German Secular Song-books of the Mid-Seventeenth Century. Aldershot, Hampshire: Ashgate. ISBN 0-7546-0642-2.
- Spagnoli, Gina (1993). "Dresden at the time of Heinrich Schütz". In Price, Curtis (ed.). The Early Baroque Era. Basingstoke, Hampshire: Macmillan. pp. 164–184. ISBN 0-333-51600-1.
- Sadie, Julie Anne (1998). "Dedekind, Constantin Christian". Companion to Baroque Music. Berkeley: University of California Press. p. 196. ISBN 0-520-21414-5.
