= Es ist genug =

1662 hymn by Franz Joachim Burmeister

- Lutheran hymn
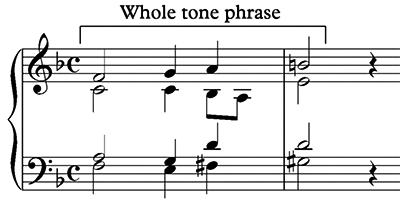
- Beginning of Bach's setting of "Es ist genug" as the closing chorale of Cantata 60
- English: It is enough
- Catalogue: Zahn 7173
- Written: 1662
- Text: by Franz Joachim Burmeister
- Language: German
- Based on: 1 Kings 19:4
- Melody: by Johann Rudolph Ahle
- Composed: 1662
- Published: 1659

"Es ist genug" ("It is enough") is a German Lutheran hymn, with text by Franz Joachim Burmeister, written in 1662. The melody, Zahn No. 7173, was written by Johann Rudolph Ahle who collaborated with the poet. It begins with a sequence of three consecutive rising whole tone intervals.

The hymn's last stanza was used by Johann Sebastian Bach as the closing chorale of his cantata O Ewigkeit, du Donnerwort, BWV 60. His setting has been quoted in music, notably in Alban Berg's Violin Concerto.

== History ==
Franz Joachim Burmeister wrote "Es ist genug" in 1662. The topic is a yearning for death. It is inspired by the sentiment the prophet Elijah expresses in the First Book of Kings: "It is enough; now, O Lord, take away my life; for I am not better than my fathers" (1 Kings 19:4). All seven stanzas begin and end with the line "Es ist genug". It was printed in 1844 in the hymnal Gesangbuch zum gottesdienstlichen Gebrauche in den Stadtkirchen zu Leipzig (Hymnal for Use in the Service of the Town Churches of Leipzig), in the section "Vorbereitung auf den Tod" ("Of the preparation for death").

== Melody and settings ==
The melody, also from 1662, is by Johann Rudolph Ahle, who collaborated with Burmeister on several hymns. He was church musician at Divi Blasii in Mühlhausen, a position Bach later also held. The tune begins with an unusual motif of three upward whole tone intervals, the first half of a whole tone scale and also the first three notes of the diatonic Lydian mode. The interval from the first to the fourth note is a tritone, sometimes called diabolus in musica (devil in music). Alfred Dürr writes that the opening "might have been felt outrageous" at the time of its composition, "only justified as a musical figure depicting the soul's crossing over from life into death".

"Es ist genug" by J. S. Bach, the closing chorale from BWV 60

Bach used the hymn's last stanza to conclude his cantata O Ewigkeit, du Donnerwort, BWV 60, and it has often been quoted, notably in Alban Berg's Violin Concerto. Berg wrote variations on the chorale in the concerto's last movement. It was his last finished work. Otto Klemperer wrote in the newspaper Wiener Tag on 21 October 1936: "The second movement begins with the J. S. Bach chorale 'Es ist genug': 'It is enough! Lord, if it please Thee, my Jesus, come! World, good night. I go to the heavenly house, with a heart full of joy. My sorrows remain below.' The variations on this chorale, the sounds that emanate from the violin, that bring into being a completely new world for the instrument, the way in which at the conclusion the music seems to span the cosmos, from the lowest depths to the sublime heights".
