= Henning Dedekind =

German composer

Henning Dedekind (30 December 1562 – 28 July 1626) was a German Lutheran clergyman, and a composer.

== Life and family ==
He was born in Neustadt am Rübenberge, and studied in Erfurt, matriculating in 1582. In 1586 he moved to Langensalza, where he was initially a cantor, and later a preacher. From 1615 he was a priest in Gebesee; he died there in 1626.

He married in 1590 Christine, daughter of Melchior Stiefel, a businessman; they had several children. He married about 1617 Dorothea, widow of Heinrich Heilschwing, a jeweller. Among the children of Henning and Christine Dedekind was Stephan Dedekind (1595–1636), a priest in Reinsdorf, Thuringia and father of the composer and poet Constantin Christian Dedekind.

== Works ==
The following works by Dedekind were printed in Erfurt:

- Dodekatonon musicum Triciniorum. Neuwe ausserlesene Tricinia auff fürtreffliche lustige Texte.... ("New choice pieces for three voices with excellent cheerful texts") (1588)
- Soldatenleben.... 5 voc. zum Gebrauch für allerlei Instrumente ("Soldier's lives.... in five voices, to be played by any instruments") (1628)
- Eine Kindermusik für die jetzt allererst anfangenden Knaben, in richtige Fragen und gründliche Antworten gebracht ("Children's music for boys at the very beginning, in the form of correct questions and thorough answers") (1589)
- Praecursor metricus musicae artis ("Introductory steps in the art of music") (1590)
