= Elbschwanenorden =

Historical German literary association

The Elbschwanenorden (Order of Elbe Swans) was a literary association of the Baroque, founded between 1656 and 1660, dissolved in 1667. It was initiated by the poet and Protestant minister Johann Rist in Wedel and is named after the situation of the town on the lower Elbe. One of the goals was to maintain the integrity of the German language.

== Members ==
The members took Ordensnamen which are given in italics.

- Daniel Bärholz (Philoclythus)
- Franz Burmeister (Sylvander)
- Constantin Christian Dedekind (ConCorD)
- Georg Greflinger (Celadon)
- Conrad von Höveln (Candorin)
- Friedrich Hofmann (Epigrammatocles)
- Martin von Kempe (Kleodor)
- Balthasar Kindermann (Kurandor)
- Matthäus Merian (Artisander)
- Johannes Praetorius (Prophulidor)
- Johann Rist (Palatin)
- Gottfried Wilhelm Sacer (Hierophilo)
- Jacob Schwieger (Philosophander)
- Jacob Sturm (Soliander)
- Gotthilf Treuer (Fidelidor)

=== Literature ===
- Karl F. Otto, Jr.: Die Sprachgesellschaften des 17. Jahrhunderts. Metzler, Stuttgart 1972, ISBN 3-476-10109-6 (Sammlung Metzler; 109).
- Hans Schultz: Die Bestrebungen der Sprachgesellschaften des XVII. Jahrhunderts für Reinigung der deutschen Sprache. Zentralantiquariat der DDR, Leipzig 1975 (reprint of Göttingen 1888).
- Christoph Stoll: Sprachgesellschaften im Deutschland des 17. Jahrhunderts. Fruchtbringende Gesellschaft, Aufrichtige Gesellschaft von der Tannen, Deutschgesinnte Genossenschaft, Hirten- und Blumenorden an der Pegnitz, Elbschwanenorden. List, München 1973, ISBN 3-471-61463-X (List-Taschenbuch der Wissenschaft; 1463).

=== External links ===
- Reallexicon der Deutschen Altertümer auf zeno.org
