= Herz und Mund und Tat und Leben, BWV 147 =

Church cantata by Johann Sebastian Bach

Herz und Mund und Tat und Leben
- BWV 147
- Church cantata by J. S. Bach
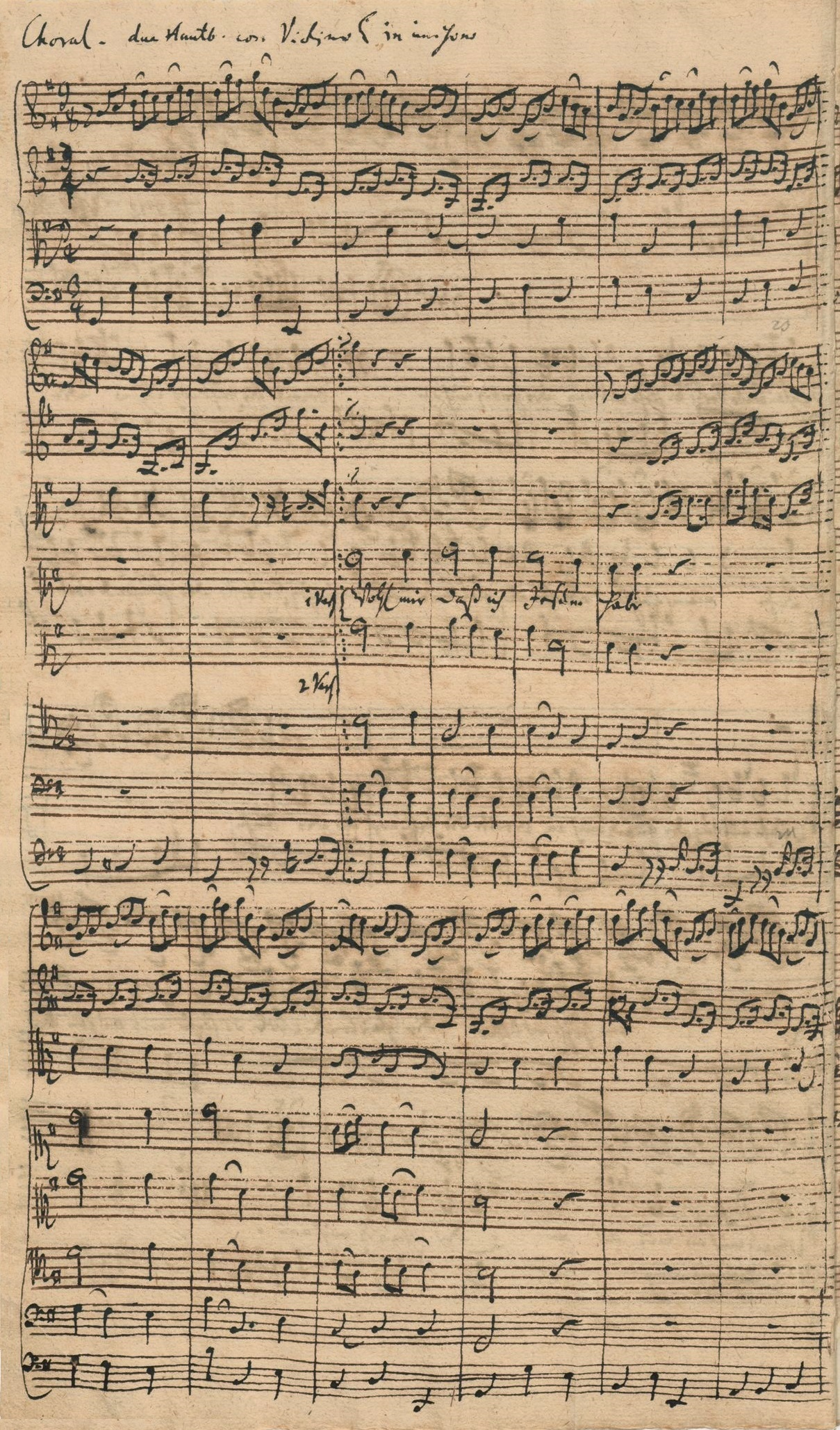
- Autograph score of the 6th movement
- Related: based on BWV 147a
- Occasion: Visitation
- Cantata text: Salomo Franck; anonymous
- Chorale: by Martin Janus
- Performed: 2 July 1723: Leipzig
- Movements: 10 in two parts
- Vocal: SATB choir and solo
- Instrumental: trumpet; 2 oboes; 2 violins; viola; continuo

Johann Sebastian Bach composed the church cantata Herz und Mund und Tat und Leben (Heart and mouth and deed and life), BWV 147 in 1723 during his first year as Thomaskantor, the director of church music in Leipzig. His cantata is part of his first cantata cycle there and was written for the Marian feast of the Visitation on 2 July, which commemorates Mary's visit to Elizabeth as narrated in the Gospel of Luke in the prescribed reading for the feast day. Bach based the music on his earlier cantata BWV 147a, written originally in Weimar in 1716 for Advent. He expanded the Advent cantata in six movements to ten movements in two parts in the new work. While the text of the Advent cantata was written by the Weimar court poet Salomo Franck, the librettist of the adapted version who added several recitatives is anonymous.

Bach began the cantata with a chorus for the full orchestra, followed by alternating recitatives and arias with often obbligato instrument. He scored it for four vocal soloists, a four-part choir, and a Baroque instrumental ensemble of trumpet, two oboes, strings, and continuo. The closing chorale of the earlier work was replaced by the hymn "Jesu, meiner Seelen Wonne" (1661) by Martin Janus, while using the melody of "Werde munter, mein Gemüte" by Johann Schop. Two of its stanzas close the two parts of the cantata in an identical setting. While Bach often composed four-part chorales to end a cantata, he embedded such a setting here in a pastoral instrumental concerto. This music became famous in a piano transcription by Dame Myra Hess as Jesu, Joy of Man's Desiring.

== History and words ==
Bach took office as Thomaskantor, the music director in Leipzig, at the end of May 1723. It was part of his duties to supply music for the Sundays and feast days of the liturgical year at four churches of the town, and he decided to compose new cantatas for these occasions. He began with a cantata for the first Sunday after Trinity in 1723, performed on 30 May, and wrote a series of church cantatas until Trinity of the next year, which became known as his first cantata cycle. Some cantatas of that cycle were based on music he had composed before, including Herz und Mund und Tat und Leben, presented as the sixth cantata of the cycle.

The Visitation was among the Marian feasts celebrated in Lutheran Germany (additional cantatas for the occasion survive, from both Bach and other composers), and was the setting for which Bach composed Herz und Mund und Tat und Leben. The prescribed readings for the feast day were Isaiah 11:1–5, the prophecy of the Messiah, and from the Gospel of Luke, Luke 1:39–56, Mary's visit to Elizabeth, including her song of praise, the Magnificat. Bach used as a basis for the music a cantata in six movements that he had written in Weimar for the fourth Sunday in Advent 1716, Herz und Mund und Tat und Leben, BWV 147a. As Leipzig observed tempus clausum (time of silence) during Advent, allowing cantata music only on the first Sunday, Bach could not perform the cantata for the same occasion in Leipzig, but adapted it for the feast of the Visitation.

The Advent cantata text was written by the Weimar court poet, librarian and numismatist, Salomo Franck, who published it in his 1717 collection Evangelische Sonn- und Festtages-Andachten. He wrote four arias in a row, focused on the Advent message of "repentance, faith, preparation and conversion", in the words of John Eliot Gardiner who conducted the Bach Cantata Pilgrimage in 2000.

The text for Advent was also suitable for a feast celebrating Mary in general. An anonymous librettist adapted the text for the different occasion, mainly by adding three recitatives that clarify the relation to Visitation. He made references to the gospel reading, for example mentioning in the fourth movement, as in verse 52 of the gospel, that "the arm of the Most High thrusts the mighty from their seat and exalts the lowly," and in the eighth movement, as in verse 41, that the unborn child leaps in its mother's womb. The order of the arias was changed, and their texts were altered or (in the case of the last aria) completely rewritten; and the closing chorale was replaced by the 1661 hymn "Jesu, meiner Seelen Wonne" (Jesus, my soul's delight) by Martin Janus (or Jahn). Its stanzas 6 and 17 were selected to conclude the two parts of the new cantata which were performed before and after the sermon. They express a commitment of the believer, speaking in the first person, to hold Jesus as a high treasure.

== Music ==
=== Structure and scoring ===
Bach structured the cantata in ten movements, in two parts of six and four movements, respectively. The first movement is scored for choir and the full orchestra. The inner movements are alternating recitatives and arias for solo singers and mostly obbligato instruments. Both parts are concluded with a chorale stanza, both from the same hymn and set the same way. Bach scored the work for four vocal soloists (soprano (S), alto (A), tenor (T) and bass (B)), a four-part choir, and a Baroque instrumental ensemble: trumpet (Tr), two oboes (Ob), (oboe d'amore (Oa), oboe da caccia (Oc)), two violins (Vl), viola (Va), and basso continuo (Bc) including bassoon (Fg).

In the following table of the movements, the first columns shows the movement number, and in brackets the movement number of the Weimar cantata. The scoring follows the Neue Bach-Ausgabe. The keys and time signatures are taken from the book by Bach scholar Alfred Dürr, using the symbol for common time (4/4). The instruments are shown separately for winds and strings, while the continuo, playing throughout, is not shown.

Movements of Herz und Mund und Tat und Leben, BWV 147
No.	Title	Text	Type	Vocal	Winds	Strings	Key	Time
1 (1)	Herz und Mund und Tat und Leben	Franck	Chorus	SATB	Tr 2Ob	2Vl Va	C major	common time
2	Gebenedeiter Mund!	anon.	Recitative	T		2Vl Va		common time
3 (2)	Schäme dich, o Seele nicht	Franck	Aria	A	Oa		A minor	3/4
4	Verstockung kann Gewaltige verblenden	anon.	Recitative	B				common time
5 (4)	Bereite dir, Jesu, noch itzo die Bahn	Franck	Aria	S		Vl solo	D minor	common time
6	Wohl mir, daß ich Jesum habe	Jahn	Chorale	SATB	Tr 2Ob	2Vl Va	G major	9/8
7 (3)	Hilf, Jesu, hilf, daß ich auch dich bekenne	Franck	Aria	T			F major	3/4
8	Der höchsten Allmacht Wunderhand	anon.	Recitative	A	2Oc		C major	common time
9 (5)	Ich will von Jesu Wundern singen	anon.	Aria	B	Tr 2Ob	2Vl Va	C major	common time
10	Jesus bleibet meine Freude	Jahn	Chorale	SATB	Tr 2Ob	2Vl Va	G major	9/8

=== Movements ===
A complex choral movement is taken from the Advent cantata. The three new recitatives are scored differently, the first as an accompagnato with chords of the strings, the second secco accompanied only by the continuo, the third as another accompagnato, with oboes. Three of the arias from the original cantata are scored for voice and solo instruments or only continuo, whereas the last aria, speaking of the miracles of Jesus, is accompanied by the full orchestra.

==== 1 ====
The opening chorus, "Herz und Mund und Tat und Leben" (Heart and mouth and deed and life), renders the complete words in three sections, the third one a reprise of the first one and even the middle section not too different in character – it is thus not quite in the traditional da capo form. The piece begins with an instrumental ritornello, with trumpet and oboes combining to give a solemn opening fanfare. The first section begins with an animated fugal exposition with colla parte instruments. The fugue subject stresses the word Leben (life) with a melisma extended over three measures. The soprano starts the theme, the alto enters just one measure later, tenor after two more measures, bass one measure later, the fast succession resulting in lively music as a good image of life. This quick passage is followed by a purely vocal passage, sustained only by the continuo, on the words "ohne Furcht und Heuchelei" ("without fear or hypocrisy"). The central section is introduced by the initial ritornello, which brings an alternation of contrapuntal and homophonic phrases, before a return of the slightly varied ritornello. The final section features the same pattern of entrances as the first, but building from the lowest voice to the highest. The chorus concludes with a repetition of the ritornello.

==== 2 ====
The first recitative for tenor, "Gebenedeiter Mund! Maria macht ihr Innerstes der Seelen durch Dank und Rühmen kund" (Blessed mouth! Mary makes the inmost part of her soul known through thanks and praise), introduces the tender and emotive environment which characterises the work after the opening festive flourish. It is accompanied by chords from the strings. French musicologist Gilles Cantagrel describes the recitative as having a character "tenderly evoking the Virgin singing the Magnificat".

==== 3 ====
The first aria, "Schäme dich, o Seele nicht, deinen Heiland zu bekennen" (Do not be ashamed, o soul, to acknowledge your Savior), is scored as a trio for the oboe d'amore, alto and continuo, in an overall very expressive air that has characteristics of an intimate meditation. The initial ritornello already features a hesitant rhythm, with syncopations and hemiolas taking away from the piece's regularity: combined with the use of the alto voice (usually associated with fear or doubt), this suggests an attempt to translate into music the doubts which beset the Christian soul.

==== 4 ====
The second recitative is for bass, a secco accompanied only by the continuo. "Verstockung kann Gewaltige verblenden, bis sie des Höchsten Arm vom Stuhle stößt" (Astonishment might dazzle the mighty, until the arm of the Highest throws them), relates to the Deposuit potentes verse from the Magnificat. This is illustrated through the intervention of the continuo, which translates the text into large ascending and descending movements.

==== 5 ====
The second aria, "Bereite dir, Jesu, noch itzo die Bahn" (Prepare, Jesus, even now the path for Yourself), was the third in the Advent cantata. Scored as a trio, the solo violin expresses confidence in divine mercy through triplets punctuated by the continuo. The soprano occasionally soars above, giving a serene and gracious feeling to a movement which otherwise appears quite simple.

==== 6 ====
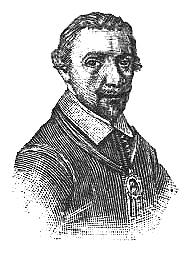
Johann Schop who composed the melody for a different text

The chorale ending Part I, titled Wohl mir, daß ich Jesum habe (It is well for me that I have Jesus), is the sixth stanza from the hymn, setting a melody by Johann Schop, "Werde munter, mein Gemüte", which Bach also used in his St Matthew Passion for the words "Bin ich gleich von dir gewichen". The simple four-part choral part is embedded in a setting of the full orchestra dominated by a motive in pastoral triplets derived from the first line of the chorale melody.

Wohl mir, daß ich Jesum habe,
O wie feste halt ich ihn,
Daß er mir mein Herze labe,
Wenn ich krank und traurig bin.
Jesum hab ich, der mich liebet
Und sich mir zu eigen gibet;
Ach drum laß ich Jesum nicht,
Wenn mir gleich mein Herze bricht.

It is well for me, that I have Jesus,
Oh how tightly I hold him,
So that he refreshes my heart,
When I am sick and sad.
I have Jesus, who loves me
And gives himself to me as his own;
Oh, that is why I will not let Jesus go,
Even if my heart breaks.

Gardiner calls this music of "mellifluous beauty and apparent naturalness", and points out that it is nonetheless derived from the hymn tune.

==== 7 ====
In the original autograph, this movement bears two additional markings: Parte seconda ("second part") and Nach der Predigt (after the sermon), thus indicating its function within the Lutheran liturgy of the time as the conclusion of what was introduced by the first part. In the third aria (which had been the second in the Advent cantata), the tenor, accompanied only by the continuo, sings a prayer for help: "Hilf, Jesu, hilf, daß ich auch dich bekenne in Wohl und Weh, in Freud und Leid" (Help, Jesus, help that I may also acknowledge You in prosperity and in woe, in joy and in sorrow). The initial motive is repeated throughout the aria, its music serving to remind us of the associated text. The active continuo supports the vocal line, which expresses the textual call for help with striking confidence, in a simple and conjunct melody.

==== 8 ====
The third recitative is for alto: Der höchsten Allmacht Wunderhand wirkt im Verborgenen der Erden (The wondrous hand of the exalted Almighty is active in the mysteries of the earth). It is accompanied by two oboes da caccia which add a continuous expressive motive, interrupted only when the child's leaping in the womb (in German: Hüpfen) is mentioned which they illustrate. Gardiner mentions that it foreshadows recitatives of the later great Passions. The text is inspired by the first two lines of the Magnificat.

==== 9 ====
The last aria speaks of proclaiming the miracles of Jesus. The bass is accompanied by the full orchestra: "Ich will von Jesu Wundern singen und ihm der Lippen Opfer bringen" (I will sing of Jesus' wonders and bring my lip's offering to Him), expressing the wonders of faith with trumpet, oboes and strings giving a jubilatory tone which appears as a response to the initial chorus, with the bass adding virtuoso embellishments on "Opfer" and "Feuer", answering the continuo.

==== 10 ====
The chorale concluding Part II is the same music as for Part I, setting the 17th stanza, "Jesus bleibet meine Freude, meines Herzens Trost und Saft" (Jesus shall remain my joy, my heart's comfort and strength).

Jesus bleibet meine Freude,
Meines Herzens Trost und Saft,
Jesus wehret allem Leide,
Er ist meines Lebens Kraft,
Meiner Augen Lust und Sonne,
Meiner Seele Schatz und Wonne;
Darum laß ich Jesum nicht
Aus dem Herzen und Gesicht.

Jesus remains my joy,
My heart's comfort and strength,
Jesus protects against all suffering,
He is the strength of my life,
My eyes' joy and sun,
My soul's treasure and delight;
Therefore I will not let Jesus
Out of my heart and my sight.

The music of the chorale movements is now best known for the piano transcription by Dame Myra Hess of Hugh P. Allen's choral version of Bach's arrangement, and is notable under the title Jesu, Joy of Man's Desiring, an inexact translation that transforms the original affirmation ("Jesus remains my joy") into a wish.

== Recordings ==
In the following table of recordings, instrumental groups playing period instruments in historically informed performances are highlighted by a green background.

Recordings of Herz und Mund und Tat und Leben, BWV 147
Title	Conductor / Choir / Orchestra	Soloists	Label	Year	Instr
Les Grandes Cantates de J. S. Bach Vol. 1	Fritz Werner Heinrich-Schütz-Chor Heilbronn Pforzheim Chamber Orchestra	Ingeborg Reichelt; Margarethe Bence; Helmut Krebs; Franz Kelch	Erato	1957	Chamber
Bach Cantatas Vol. 3 – Ascension Day, Whitsun, Trinity	Karl Richter Münchener Bach-Chor Münchener Bach-Orchester	Ursula Buckel; Hertha Töpper; John van Kesteren; Kieth Engen	Archiv Produktion	1961	
Bach Cantata BWV 147, Motets BWV 226, BWV 228, BWV 230	David Willcocks Münchener Bach-Chor Academy of St Martin in the Fields	Elly Ameling; Janet Baker; Ian Partridge; John Shirley-Quirk	EMI	1970	
Bach: 13 Sacred Cantatas & 13 Sinfonias	Helmut Winschermann Nederlands Vocaal Ensemble Deutsche Bachsolisten	Ileana Cotrubas; Julia Hamari; Kurt Equiluz; William Reimer	Philips	1972	
Die Bach Kantate Vol. 12	Helmuth Rilling Frankfurter Kantorei Bach-Collegium Stuttgart	Arleen Augér; Helen Watts; Kurt Equiluz; Wolfgang Schöne	Hänssler	1977	
J.S. Bach: Das Kantatenwerk Vol. 36	Nikolaus Harnoncourt Tölzer Knabenchor Concentus Musicus Wien	Alan Bergius (boy soprano); Stefan Rampf (boy alto); Kurt Equiluz; Thomas Hampson	Teldec	1981	Period
J. S. Bach: 6 Favourite Cantatas	Joshua Rifkin The Bach Ensemble	Jane Bryden; Drew Minter; Jeffrey Thomas; Jan Opalach	L'Oiseau-Lyre	1985	Period
J. S. Bach: Cantatas	John Eliot Gardiner Monteverdi Choir English Baroque Soloists	Ruth Holton; Michael Chance; Anthony Rolfe Johnson; Stephen Varcoe	Archiv Produktion	1990	Period
J. S. Bach: Complete Cantatas Vol. 7	Ton Koopman Amsterdam Baroque Orchestra & Choir	Lisa Larsson; Bogna Bartosz; Gerd Türk; Klaus Mertens	Antoine Marchand	1997	Period
J. S. Bach: Cantatas Vol. 12 – Cantatas from Leipzig 1723	Masaaki Suzuki Bach Collegium Japan	Yukari Nonoshita; Robin Blaze; Gerd Türk; Peter Kooy	BIS	1999	Period

== Cited sources ==
- "Herz und Mund und Tat und Leben BWV 147; BC A 174 / Sacred cantata (The Visitation of Mary (2 July))". Bach Digital. 2017.
- Arnold, Denis (1983). The New Oxford Companion to Music. Oxford University Press. ISBN 0-19-311316-3.
- Cantagrel, Gilles (2010). "Herz und Mund und Tat und Leben". Les cantates de J.-S. Bach textes, traductions, commentaires. Paris: Fayard. pp. 1134–1141. ISBN 978-2-213-644349.
- Dellal, Pamela (2012). "BWV 147 – "Herz und Mund und Tat und Leben"". Emmanuel Music.
- Dürr, Alfred; Jones, Richard D. P. (2006). The Cantatas of J. S. Bach: With Their Librettos in German-English Parallel Text. Oxford University Press. pp. 26, 670–676. ISBN 978-0-19-929776-4.
- Gardiner, John Eliot (2009). Johann Sebastian Bach (1685-1750) / Cantatas Nos 36, 61, 62, 70, 132 & 147 (Media notes). Soli Deo Gloria (at Hyperion Records website).
- Jones, Richard D. P. (2007). The Creative Development of Johann Sebastian Bach, Volume I: 1695–1717: Music to Delight the Spirit. Oxford University Press. pp. 293–295. ISBN 978-0-19-816440-1.
- Quinn, John (2005). "J.S. Bach Fritz Werner (volume 3 reissued 2005)". musicweb-international.com.
- Wolff, Christoph (2002). Johann Sebastian Bach: The Learned Musician. Oxford University Press. p. 164. ISBN 978-0-393-32256-9.
- Wollschläger, Karin (2012). Herz und Mund und Tat und Leben / Heart and mouth and thought and action / BWV 147 / Leipziger Fassung / Leipzig version (1723) (PDF). Carus. pp. 1–36.
