= Jesu, Joy of Man's Desiring =

Arrangement of a chorale from a Bach cantata

"Jesu, Joy of Man's Desiring" is the popular English title of the chorale from the 1723 Advent cantata Herz und Mund und Tat und Leben (Heart and Mouth and Deed and Life), BWV 147, by Johann Sebastian Bach on the top of Johann Schop's psalm melody. The chorale occurs twice in the cantata, with different texts each time (neither of which matches the English): as its sixth movement, Wohl mir, dass ich Jesum habe (It is well for me that I have Jesus), and again as its tenth movement, Jesus bleibet meine Freude (Jesus Remains My Joy). The English title was used in a 1908 publication of "Three Chorales" by the Church Music Society, and was further popularized by the piano transcriptions made by Myra Hess, in 1926 for piano solo and in 1934 for piano duet, as published by Oxford University Press. Whether played instrumentally or sung in German or English, the chorale is often heard at weddings and during Advent, Christmas, and Easter.

== Background ==
Bach composed a four-part setting with independent orchestral accompaniment of two stanzas of the hymn Jesu, meiner Seelen Wonne, which had been written by Martin Janus in 1661 and was commonly sung to a Johann Schop melody, Werde munter, mein Gemüthe.

== Structure and scoring ==
Herz und Mund und Tat und Leben has ten movements and is in two parts, with the chorale concluding each part. Bach scored it for choir, trumpet, violin, and basso continuo, with optional parts for oboe and viola.

== Instrumental arrangements ==
External audio
- You may hear Dame Myra Hess performing her transcription of Bach's "Jesu, Joy of Man's Desiring" in 1940; Here on archive.org
- You may hear Bach's "Jesu, Joy of Man's Desiring" performed by E. Power Biggs; Here on Archive.org

The music's wide popularity has led to numerous arrangements and transcriptions, such as for the classical guitar and, on Wendy Carlos' album Switched-On Bach, the Moog synthesizer. According to The New Oxford Companion to Music, the best-known transcriptions for piano are those by Hess.

== Text ==
=== English text ===
The following is a version with words attributed to the poet laureate Robert Bridges. It is not a translation of the stanzas used within Bach's original version, but is inspired by stanzas of the same hymn that Bach had drawn upon: "Jesu, meiner Seelen Wonne", the lyrics of which were written in 1661 by Martin Janus (or Jahn), and which was sung to Johann Schop's 1642 "Werde munter, mein Gemüte" hymn tune.

Performance of chorale from BWV 147, "Jesus bleibet meine Freude"
by the Orchestra Gli Armonici (3:22)

Jesu, (Note: Jesu is the Latin vocative case of the name, formerly used in English texts, too.) joy of man's desiring,
Holy wisdom, love most bright;
Drawn by Thee, our souls aspiring
Soar to uncreated light.

Word of God, our flesh that fashioned,
With the fire of life impassioned,
Striving still to truth unknown,
Soaring, dying round Thy throne.

Through the way where hope is guiding,
Hark, what peaceful music rings;
Where the flock, in Thee confiding,
Drink of joy from deathless springs.

Theirs is beauty's fairest pleasure;
Theirs is wisdom's holiest treasure.
Thou dost ever lead Thine own
In the love of joys unknown.

=== Original text ===
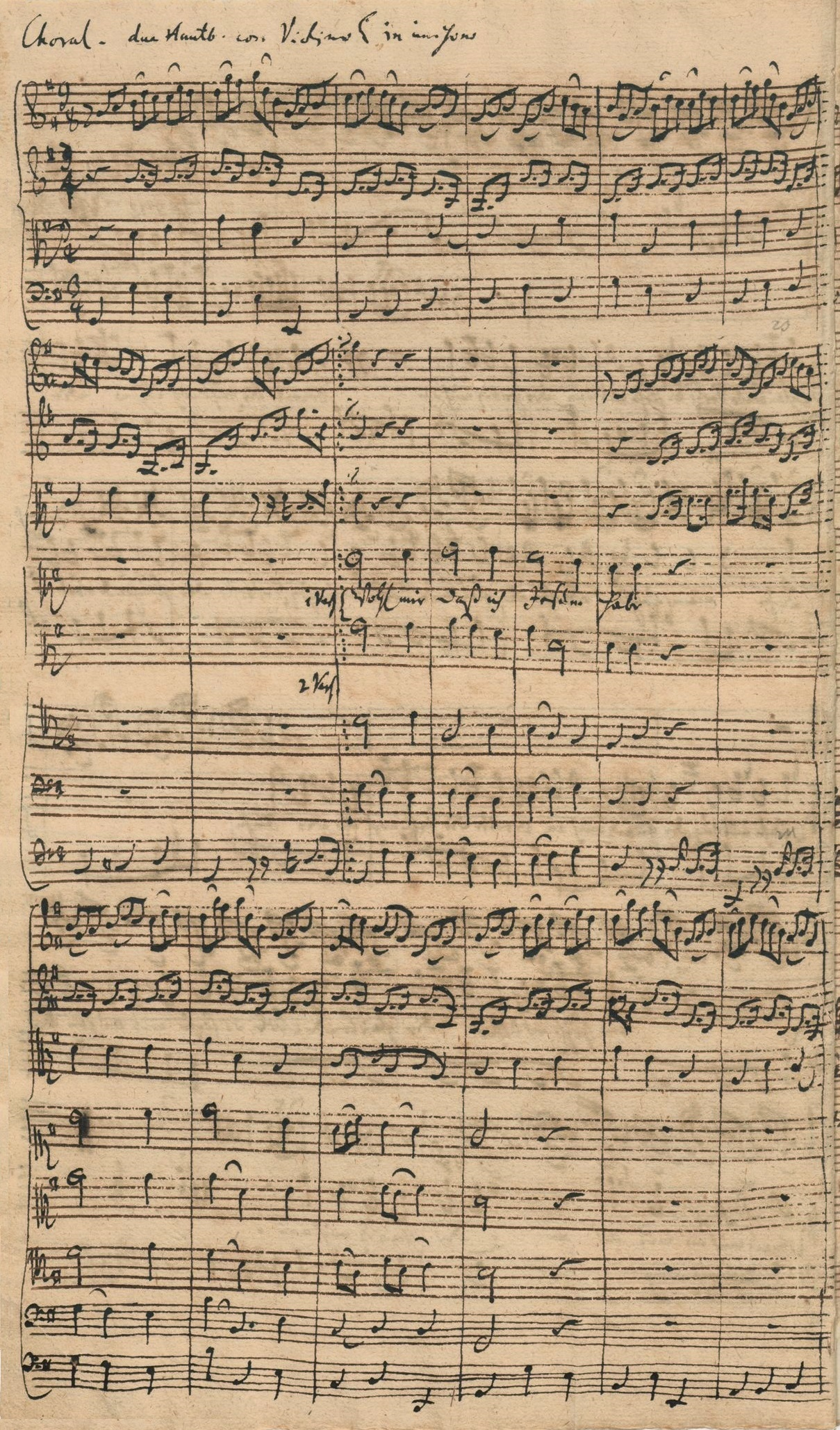
Chorale "Wohl mir, daß ich Jesum habe"

Jahn's verses express a close, friendly, and familiar friendship with Jesus, who gives life to the poet. It has been noted that the original German hymn was characteristically a lively hymn of praise, which is carried over somewhat into Bach's arrangement; whereas a slower, more stately tempo is traditionally used with the English version.

Wohl mir, daß ich Jesum habe,
o wie feste halt' ich ihn,
daß er mir mein Herze labe,
wenn ich krank und traurig bin.
Jesum hab' ich, der mich liebet
und sich mir zu eigen giebet,
ach drum laß' ich Jesum nicht,
wenn mir gleich mein Herze bricht.

Jesus bleibet meine Freude,
meines Herzens Trost und Saft,
Jesus wehret allem Leide,
er ist meines Lebens Kraft,
meiner Augen Lust und Sonne,
meiner Seele Schatz und Wonne;
darum laß' ich Jesum nicht
aus dem Herzen und Gesicht.

Well for me that I have Jesus,
O how tightly I hold him
that he might refresh my heart,
when I'm sick and sad.
Jesus I have, who loves me
and gives himself to me,
ah, therefore I will not leave Jesus,
even when my heart breaks.
—from BWV 147, chorale movement no. 6

Jesus remains my joy,
my heart's consolation and sap,
Jesus fends off all suffering,
He is my life's strength,
my eyes' delight and sun,
my soul's treasure and pleasure;
Therefore I will not leave Jesus
out of heart and sight.
—from BWV 147, chorale movement no. 10

== Modern adaptations ==
The melody and other elements have been used in several pop and classical crossover recordings:

- An arrangement for banjo and voice on Pete Seeger's 1955 album Goofing Off Suite
- "Someone I Know", on Margo Guryan's 1968 album Take a Picture
- The instrumental "Jesu, Joy of Man's Desiring", on Leo Kottke's 1969 album 6- and 12-String Guitar
- "Wicked Annabella", a 1968 track on The Kinks Are the Village Green Preservation Society, with Bach in Pete Quaife's bassline
- Included as the coda of "Cherry Blossom Clinic Revisited", on the Move's 1970 album Shazam
- "Joy", a 1972 instrumental by Apollo 100, which reached number six on the U.S. Billboard Hot 100 and number 24 in the RPM Canadian chart
- "Precious Joy" on the 1973 album Blues on Bach by the Modern Jazz Quartet
- "Dreams of You", a 1975 single by Ralph McTell which reached the top 40 of the UK Singles Chart
- "Lady Lynda", a 1979 single by the Beach Boys which reached the Top 10 of the UK Singles Chart
- "Joy", an instrumental track on George Winston's 1982 album December, inspired by an arrangement by guitarist David Qualey
- An instrumental version with the London Studio Orchestra is the final song on Amy Grant's 1992 Home for Christmas album.
- An electronic version is the first track on Takako Minekawa's 1995 maxi-single (A Little Touch Of) Baroque In Winter
- "Dormi dormi", a 2019 track on the extended album Sì by Andrea Bocelli, a lullaby inspired by the chorale, sung by Bocelli and Jennifer Garner in Italian and English

The melody has also been used notably in other media:

- "Shu yo, Hito no Nozomi no Yorokobi yo", a piano arrangement used notably throughout the 2010 visual novel Wonderful Everyday.
