= Johann Schop =

German composer (c.1590–1667)

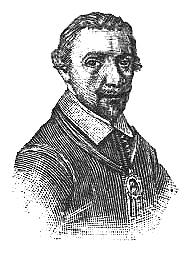
Johann Schop

Johann Schop (c. 1590 – 1667) was a German violinist and composer, [pronounced "ʃop", thus "shope" (rhymes with "hope")], much admired as a musician and a technician, who was a virtuoso and whose compositions for the violin set impressive technical demands for that area at that time. In 1756, Leopold Mozart commented on the difficulty of a trill in a work by Schop, probably composed before 1646.

He worked in Hamburg. He published books of violin music in 4 to 6 parts; some of his music was performed at the Peace of Westphalia celebrations.

His melody Werde munter, mein Gemüte of 1641 was used by Johann Sebastian Bach for the chorale movements (6 and 10) of his cantata Herz und Mund und Tat und Leben, BWV 147. The sixth movement is "Wohl mir, daß ich Jesum habe", and the tenth movement is "Jesu bleibet meine Freude". Under the English title, Jesu, Joy of Man's Desiring, Bach's chorale has been arranged for different instruments, notably for piano by Myra Hess, and has gained wide popularity.
