= Johann Rist =

German poet and dramatist (1607–1667)

The Reverend Johann Rist
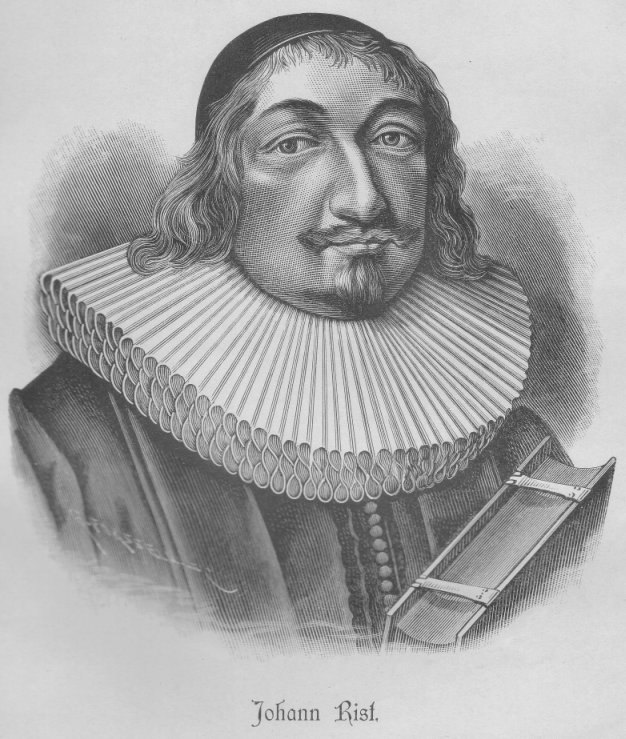
- Born: 8 March 1607; Ottensen, Holstein-Pinneberg
- Died: 31 August 1667 (aged 60); Wedel, Holstein-Glückstadt
- Occupations: Poet; Dramatist; Hymn writer; Pastor

Johann Rist (8 March 1607 – 31 August 1667) was a German Lutheran pastor, poet and dramatist best known for his hymns, which inspired musical settings and have remained in hymnals.

== Life ==
Rist was born at Ottensen in Holstein-Pinneberg (today Hamburg) on 8 March 1607; the son of the Lutheran pastor of that place, Caspar Rist. He received his early training at the Gelehrtenschule des Johanneums in Hamburg and the Gymnasium Illustre in Bremen; he then studied theology at the university of Rinteln. Under the influence of Josua Stegman there, his interest in hymn writing began. On leaving Rinteln, he tutored the sons of a Hamburg merchant, accompanying them to the University of Rostock, where he himself studied Hebrew, mathematics, and medicine. During his time at Rostock, the Thirty Years War almost emptied the university, and Rist himself lay there for several weeks, suffering from pestilence.

In 1633, he became tutor in the house of Landschreiber Heinrich Sager at Heide, in Holstein. Two years later (1635) he was appointed pastor of the village of Wedel on the Elbe. In 1633 he married Elisabeth Stapel, sister of Franz Stapel, bailiff of nearby Pinneberg. They had five children, of whom two died early; Elisabeth died 1662. In 1664, he married Anna Hagedorn, born Badenhop, widow of his friend Phillipp Hagedorn.

Rist died in Wedel on 31 August 1667.

== Work as a dramatist and poet ==
Rist first made his name known to the literary world by a drama, Perseus (1634), which he wrote while at Heide, and in the next succeeding years he produced a number of dramatic works of which the allegory Das friedewünschende Teutschland (1647) and Das friedejauchzende Teutschland (1653) (new ed. of both by H. M. Schletterer, 1864) are the most interesting. Rist soon became the central figure in a school of minor poets. The emperor Ferdinand III crowned him laureate in 1644, ennobled him in 1653, and invested him with the dignity of a Count Palatine, an honor which enabled him to the crown, and to gain numerous poets for the Elbschwanenorden (Order of Elbe Swans), a literary and poetical society which he founded in 1660. He had already, in 1645, been admitted, under the name Daphnis aus Cimbrien, to the literary order of Pegnitz, and in 1647 he became, as Der Rüstige, a member of the Fruchtbringende Gesellschaft ("Fruitbearing Society").

== Work as a hymn writer ==
It is, however, as a writer of church hymns that Rist is best known. Among these several are still retained in the Protestant hymn book: e.g. "O Ewigkeit, du Donnerwort" and "Ermuntre dich, mein schwacher Geist". Collections of his poems appeared under the titles Musa Teutonica (1634) and Himmlische Lieder (1643).

Johann Sebastian Bach composed two cantatas on "O Ewigkeit, du Donnerwort": BWV 60 (1723) using the first verse of the hymn, and the chorale cantata BWV 20 (1724) based on the entire chorale. Jesu, der du meine Seele, BWV 78, is another chorale cantata by Bach, based on the hymn with the same name by Rist.

Rist's hymn "O Gottes Geist, mein Trost und Rat" is sung to the tune of "Komm, Heiliger Geist, Herre Gott". Christiana Mariana von Ziegler included its ninth stanza in her libretto for Bach's cantata Er rufet seinen Schafen mit Namen, BWV 175.

Rist's 1641/1642 hymn "Ein trauriger Grabgesang" is notable for being an early occurrence of the phrase "God is dead" in German culture, this time in an explicitly theistic, Protestant Christian context. The text goes:

O große Not!
Gott selbst ligt tot,
Am Kreuz ist er gestorben.

== Works ==
- Die alleredelste Belustigung (1666)
- Die alleredelste Erfindung (1667)
- Das alleredelste Leben (1663)
- Erbauliche Monaths-Unterredungen (1663–1668)
- Das alleredelste Nass der gantzen Welt (1663)
- Das Friedewünschende Teuschland (1649)
- Sabbathische Seelenlust. Lüneburg: J. and H. Stern 1651
- Neue Musikalische Fest-Andachten: Lüneburg: J. and H. Stern 1655
- Neue Musikalische Katechismus-Andachten. Lüneburg: J. and H. Stern: 1656
- Himmlische Lieder. Lüneburg: J. and H. Stern 1641
- Neue Musikalische Kreutz- Trost- Lob und DankSchule. Lüneburg: J. and H. Stern 1659
