= Straf mich nicht in deinem Zorn (disambiguation) =

"Straf mich nicht in deinem Zorn / Großer Gott, verschone" is a German Psalm paraphrase by Johann Georg Albinus. It is not to be confused with:

- "Herr, straf mich nicht in deinem Zorn / Das bitt ich dich von Herzen", another German paraphrase of Psalm 6
- "Herr, straf mich nicht in deinem Zorn / Lass mich dein Grimm verzehren nicht", a German paraphrase of Psalm 38
- Straf mich nicht in deinem Zorn!, a chorale fantasia for organ by Max Reger
