= Ich bin vergnügt mit meinem Glücke, BWV 84 =

Church cantata by Johann Sebastian Bach

Ich bin vergnügt mit meinem Glücke
- BWV 84
- Solo church cantata by J. S. Bach
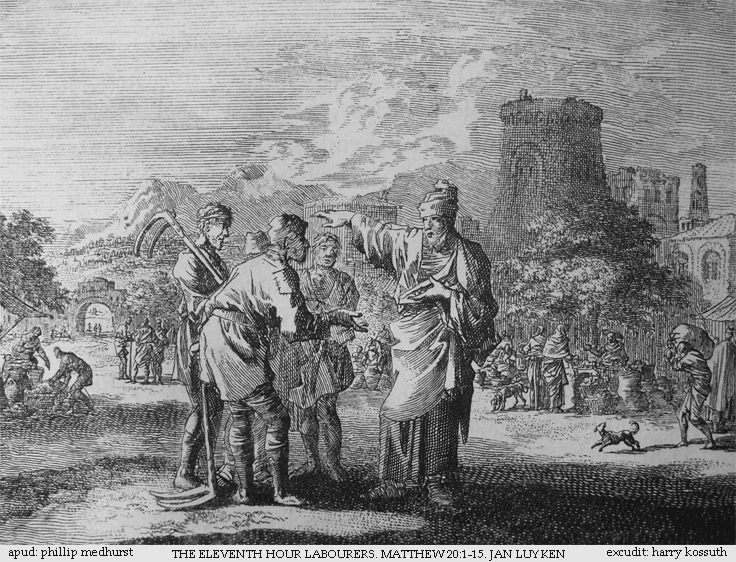
- The eleventh hour labourers etching by Jan Luyken
- Occasion: Septuagesimae
- Cantata text: Picander?
- Chorale: "Wer weiß, wie nahe mir mein Ende" by Ämilie Juliane von Schwarzburg-Rudolstadt
- Performed: 9 February 1727: Leipzig
- Movements: 5
- Vocal: solo soprano; SATB choir
- Instrumental: oboe; 2 violins; viola; continuo

Ich bin vergnügt mit meinem Glücke (I am content with my fortune), BWV 84, is a church cantata by Johann Sebastian Bach. He composed the solo cantata for soprano in Leipzig in 1727 for the Sunday Septuagesima, and led the first performance, probably on 9 February 1727.

Bach composed the work in his fourth year as Thomaskantor in Leipzig. The text is similar to a cantata text Ich bin vergnügt mit meinem Stande (I am content with my position), which Picander published in 1728, but it is not certain that he wrote also the cantata text. Its thoughts about being content are in the spirit of the beginning Enlightenment, expressed in simple language. The closing chorale is the 12th stanza of the hymn "Wer weiß, wie nahe mir mein Ende" by Ämilie Juliane von Schwarzburg-Rudolstadt. Ich bin vergnügt mit meinem Glücke is one of the few works which Bach called "Cantata" himself.

Bach structured the work in five movements, alternating arias and recitatives, and a closing chorale. The scoring requires only a small ensemble of a soprano soloist, three additional vocal parts for the chorale, and a Baroque instrumental ensemble of oboe, strings and basso continuo. While the first aria is pensive and elegiac, the second aria is of dancing folk-like character.

== History and words ==
Bach wrote the solo cantata in Leipzig, in his fourth year as Thomaskantor (director of church music) in Leipzig, for the third Sunday before Lent, called Septuagesima. The prescribed readings for the Sunday were taken from the First Epistle to the Corinthians, "race for victory" (1 Corinthians 9:24–10:5), and from the Gospel of Matthew, the parable of the Workers in the Vineyard (Matthew 20:1–16). Bach had already composed two cantatas for the occasion in earlier years, Nimm, was dein ist, und gehe hin, BWV 144, in 1724, and the chorale cantata Ich hab in Gottes Herz und Sinn, BWV 92, in 1725. Ich bin vergnügt mit meinem Glücke is one of the few works which Bach called "Cantata" himself.

As in the earlier years, the cantata text is related to the gospel in the general way that the Christian should be content with his share of good fortune, without envy of others who may seem more fortunate. The title and the text show similarities to Picander's Ich bin vergnügt mit meinem Stande (I am content with my position), published in 1728. It is unclear if both texts are by Picander, or if Picander based his on a former one, or if Picander's was already available at the time of the composition but was changed. As the Bach scholar Klaus Hofmann observes, the thoughts are in the spirit of the beginning Enlightenment, "praise of frugality, of modesty with that which God has allocated to us, of satisfaction, of lack of envy towards others". The language is no longer the "rhetorical pathos of baroque poetry", but "radicality and artistry of the imagery. The language is simple and terse; it is rational rather than figurative."

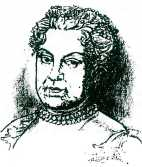
The author of the hymn lyrics

The closing chorale is the 12th stanza of the funeral hymn "Wer weiß, wie nahe mir mein Ende" by Ämilie Juliane von Schwarzburg-Rudolstadt (1686). Bach had used its first stanza in his cantatas Wo gehest du hin? BWV 166 (1724) and in Wer weiß, wie nahe mir mein Ende? BWV 27 (1726).

Bach led the first performance, probably on 9 February 1727.

== Music ==
=== Scoring and structure ===
Bach structured the cantata in five movements. A sequence of alternating arias and recitatives is concluded by a chorale. Bach scored the work for soprano soloist, a four-part choir only in the chorale, and a Baroque instrumental ensemble of oboe (Ob), two violins (Vl), viola (Va), and basso continuo. The heading of the autograph score reads: "J.J. Dominica Septuagesimae Cantata", which means: "Jesus help. Cantata for the Sunday Septuagesima". Bach added a more precise extra page: "Dominica Septuages. / Ich bin vergnügt mit meinem Glücke / à / Soprano Solo è / 3 Ripieni / 1 Hautbois / 2 Violini / Viola / e Continuo / di / Joh:Seb:Bach". The scoring is modest, appropriate for the weeks leading to Lent. The duration is given as about 16 minutes.

In the following table of the movements, the scoring follows the Neue Bach-Ausgabe. The keys and time signatures are taken from the book on all cantatas by the Bach scholar Alfred Dürr, using the symbol for common time (4/4). The continuo, playing throughout, is not shown.

Movements of Ich bin vergnügt mit meinem Glücke
No.	Title	Text	Type	Vocal	Winds	Strings	Key	Time
1	Ich bin vergnügt mit meinem Glücke	Picander	Aria	Soprano	Ob	2Vl Va	E minor	3/4
2	Gott ist mir ja nichts schuldig	Picander	Recitative	Soprano				common time
3	Ich esse mit Freuden mein weniges Brot	Picander	Aria	Soprano	Ob	Vl	G major	3/8
4	Im Schweiße meines Angesichts	Picander	Recitative	Soprano		2Vl Va		common time
5	Ich leb indes in dir vergnüget	Schwarzburg-Rudolstadt	Chorale	SATB	Ob	2Vl Va	E minor	common time

=== Movements ===
Although the vocal and instrumental parts are limited, Bach achieves variety by movements of different instrumentation and character.

==== 1 ====
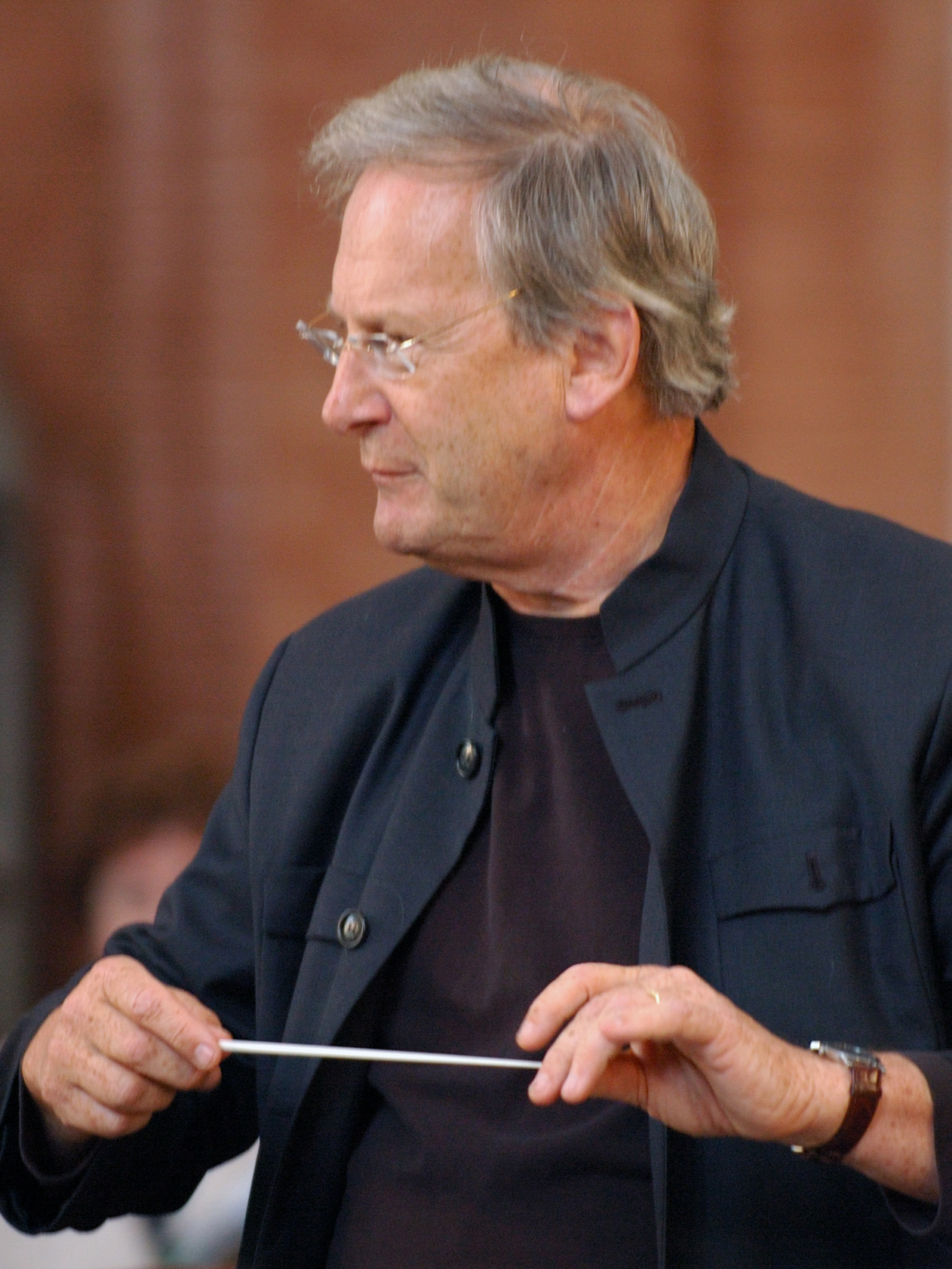
John Eliot Gardiner, who conducted the Bach Cantata Pilgrimage, in 2007

The opening aria, "Ich bin vergnügt mit meinem Glücke, das mir der liebe Gott beschert." (I am content with my fortune which our dear God has allotted me.), is slow and pensive, accompanied by all instruments, reminiscent of the slow movement of an oboe concerto. John Eliot Gardiner, who conducted the Bach Cantata Pilgrimage in 2000, noted in the project diary that Bach, who possibly was not content with his situation in Leipzig, composed music portraying "ambivalence and complexity". His music is "dynamic and fluctuating", capturing "wistful, resigned, elegiac" moods. The musicologist Julian Mincham notes that the aria compares to Ich bin in mir vergnügt, BWV 204 (I am content in myself) which he describes as "also a highly personal work for solo soprano with a similar theme, exploring comparable human emotions".

==== 2 ====
The first recitative, "Gott ist mir ja nichts schuldig" (God indeed owes me nothing), is secco.

==== 3 ====
The second aria, "Ich esse mit Freuden mein weniges Brot und gönne dem Nächsten von Herzen das Seine." (I eat my little bit of bread with joy and heartily leave to my neighbor his own.), is dancing and accompanied by two obbligato parts, oboe and violin. They express in vivid figuration in the violin and a slightly simplified version in the oboe the text "ein fröhlicher Geist, ein dankbares Herze, das lobet und preist" (a happy spirit, a thankful heart, that gives praise). Hofmann observes that the aria depicts a "pastoral idyll with a rustic musical scene – a tribute to the Enlightenment utopia of simple, happy country life." The violin's figuration suggests the drone of bagpipes or hurdy-gurdy. The voice leaps in upward sixths, in "folk-like character" and conveying "contented tranquillity". Mincham notes that the first four notes of the oboe ritornello are the first four notes of the closing chorale turned to major.

==== 4 ====
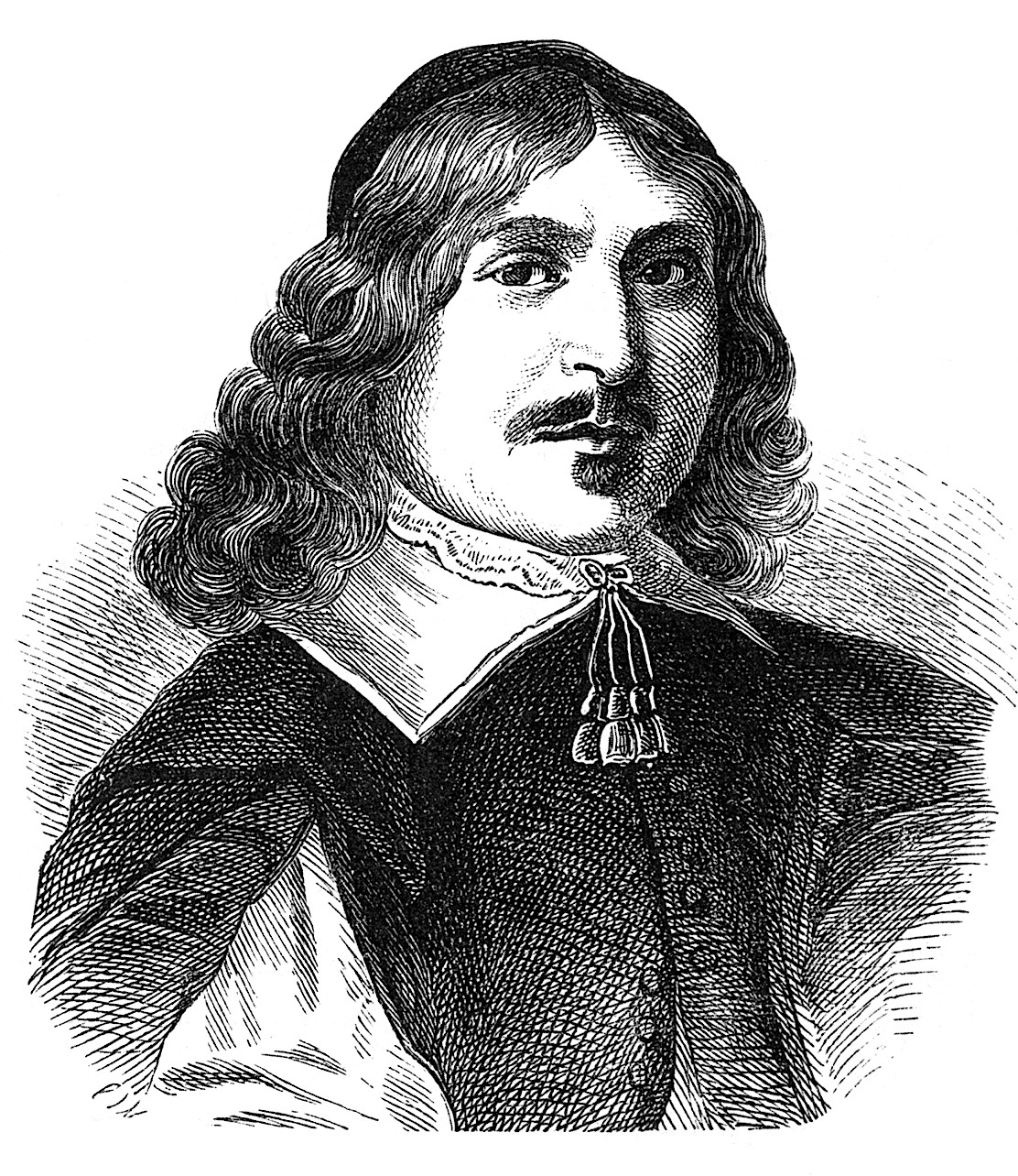
Georg Neumark, the writer of the hymn tune

The second recitative, "Im Schweiße meines Angesichts will ich indes mein Brot genießen" (In the sweat of my brow I will meanwhile enjoy my bread), is accompanied by the strings.

==== 5 ====
The chorale, "Ich leb indes in dir vergnüget und sterb ohn alle Kümmernis" (Meanwhile, I live contented in You and die without any trouble), is a four-part setting of the tune "Wer nur den lieben Gott lässt walten" by Georg Neumark. Gardiner interprets the marking a soprano solo e a 3 ripieni (for soprano and three ripieno parts) as meaning that no instruments play colla parte with the voices.

== Recordings ==
The listing is taken from the selection provided on the Bach Cantatas Website. In the following table, ensembles playing on period instruments in historically informed performance are marked by a green background.

Recordings of Ich bin vergnügt mit meinem Glücke, BWV 84
Title	Conductor / Choir / Orchestra	Soloists	Label	Year	Instr.
J. S. Bach: Cantatas No. 106, No. 84	Hermann Scherchen Wiener Akademie Kammerchor Orchestra of the Vienna State Opera	Magda László	Westminster	1952	
J. S. Bach: Cantatas BWV 49 & BWV 84	Wilhelm Ehmann Westfälische Kantorei Instrumental Ensemble	Agnes Giebel	Cantate	1961	
Bach: Kantaten BWV 52, BWV 84 & BWV 209	Raymond Leppard English Chamber Orchestra	Elly Ameling	Philips	1982	
Die Bach Kantate Vol. 26	Helmuth Rilling Gächinger Kantorei Württembergisches Kammerorchester Heilbronn	Arleen Augér	Hänssler	1983	
Bach Edition Vol. 15 – Cantatas Vol. 8	Pieter Jan Leusink Holland Boys Choir Netherlands Bach Collegium	Ruth Holton	Brilliant Classics	2000	Period
Bach Cantatas Vol. 20: Naarden / Southwell / For Septuagesima / For Sexagesima	John Eliot Gardiner Monteverdi Choir English Baroque Soloists	Miah Persson	Soli Deo Gloria	2000	Period
J. S. Bach: Complete Cantatas Vol. 20	Ton Koopman Amsterdam Baroque Orchestra & Choir	Sandrine Piau	Antoine Marchand	2003	Period
J. S. Bach: Christus, der ist mein Leben – Cantates BWV 27, 84, 95 & 161	Philippe Herreweghe Collegium Vocale Gent	Dorothee Mields	Harmonia Mundi France	2007	Period
J. S. Bach: Geistliche Solokantaten für Sopran	Helmut Müller-Brühl Bach Vokalensemble Köln Kölner Kammerorchester	Siri Thornhill	Naxos	2007	Chamber
J.S. Bach: Cantatas Vol. 41 (Solo Cantatas) – BWV 56, 82, 84, 158	Masaaki Suzuki Bach Collegium Japan	Carolyn Sampson	BIS	2007	Period

== Sources ==
- Ich bin vergnügt mit meinem Glücke, BWV 84: Scores at the International Music Score Library Project
- Ich bin vergnügt mit meinem Glücke BWV 84; BC A 43 / Sacred cantata (Septuagesima) Bach Digital
- BWV 84 Ich bin vergnügt mit meinem Glücke English translation, University of Vermont
- Luke Dahn: BWV 84.5 bach-chorales.com
