= Straf mich nicht in deinem Zorn =

Lutheran hymn by Johann Georg Albinus

- Lutheran hymn
- Text: by Johann Georg Albinus
- Language: German
- Based on: Psalm 6
- Published: 1694

"Straf mich nicht in deinem Zorn" (Do not punish me in your anger) is a Lutheran hymn with a text written by Johann Georg Albinus as a paraphrase of Psalm 6. It was first printed with a formerly secular melody in Dresden in 1694. The song was included in 31 hymnals. The melody inspired musical settings both for organ and vocal works. The hymn was translated by Catherine Winkworth as "Not in anger, Mighty God", which appeared in 13 hymnals.

== History and lyrics ==
Johann Georg Albinus, a Lutheran minister in Naumburg, wrote the lyrics in seven stanzas. He paraphrased Psalm 6, which begins in the King James Version "O Lord, rebuke me not in thine anger, neither chasten me in thy hot displeasure." (Psalms 6). The song was included in 31 hymnals.

It was translated several times, including Catherine Winkworth's "Not in anger, Mighty God", which appeared in 13 hymnals.

Straf mich nicht in deinem Zorn,
Großer Gott, verschone;
Ach lass mich nicht sein verlorn,
Nach Verdienst nicht lohne.
Hat die Sünd
dich entzündt,
Lass um Christi willen
Deinen Zorn sich stillen.

Herr: wer denkt im Tode dein,
Wer dankt in der Höllen?
Rette mich aus jener Pein
Der verdammten Seelen,
Dass ich dir
für und für
Dort an jenem Tage,
Höchster Gott, Lob sage.

Zeig mir deine Vaterhuld,
stärk mit Trost mich Schwachen;
ach Herr, hab mit mir Geduld,
wollst gesund mich machen.
Heil die Seel
mit dem Öl
deiner großen Gnaden,
wend ab allen Schaden.

Ach sieh mein´ Gebeine an,
wie sie all erstarren;
meine Seele gar nicht kann
deiner Hilfe harren.
Ich verschmacht,
Tag und Nacht
muß mein Lager fließen
von den Tränengüssen.

Ach ich bin so müd und matt
von den schweren Plagen;
mein Herz ist der Seufzer satt,
die nach Hilfe fragen.
Wie so lang
machst du bang
meiner armen Seele
in der Schwermutshöhle!

Weicht, ihr Feinde, weicht von mir,
Gott erhört mein Beten.
Nunmehr darf ich mit Begier
vor sein Antlitz treten.
Teufel, weich!
Hölle fleuch!
Was mich je gekränket,
hat mir Gott geschenket.

Vater, dir sei ewig Preis
hier und auch dort oben,
wie auch Christus gleicherweis,
der allzeit zu loben;
heilger Geist,
sei gepreist,
hoch gerühmt, geehret,
dass du mich erhöret.

== Melody and settings ==
The melody was a dance tune in a manuscript dating from 1681 at the latest; it was printed with the sacred text in the collection Hundert ahnmutig- und sonderbar geistlicher Arien ("One hundred charming and remarkably spiritual Airs"), printed in Dresden in 1694.

The melody, known by the name "Wurttemburg", is sung in Anglican churches to the words Christ the Lord Is Risen Again!.

=== Organ ===
Chorale preludes on the melody were composed by Georg Philipp Telemann, Johann Gottfried Walther, Gottfried August Homilius and Johann Ernst Bach, among others. Johann Georg Herzog, Johann Georg) wrote a prelude in 1876. Max Reger used the hymn in 1899 as the base of the second of two chorale fantasias, Zwei Choralphantasien, Op. 40, the first being based on "Wie schön leucht't der Morgenstern". He composed a chorale prelude as No. 37 of his 52 Chorale Preludes, Op. 67 in 1902.

=== Vocal ===
Johann Sebastian Bach used the melody with the different hymn text "Mache dich, mein Geist, bereit" by Johann Burchard Freystein in his chorale cantata Mache dich, mein Geist, bereit BWV 115, changing the meter from common time to 6/8 in the opening chorale fantasia.
