= Zwei Choralphantasien, Op. 40 =

1899 compositions by Max Reger

Zwei Choralphantasien
- Chorale fantasias by Max Reger
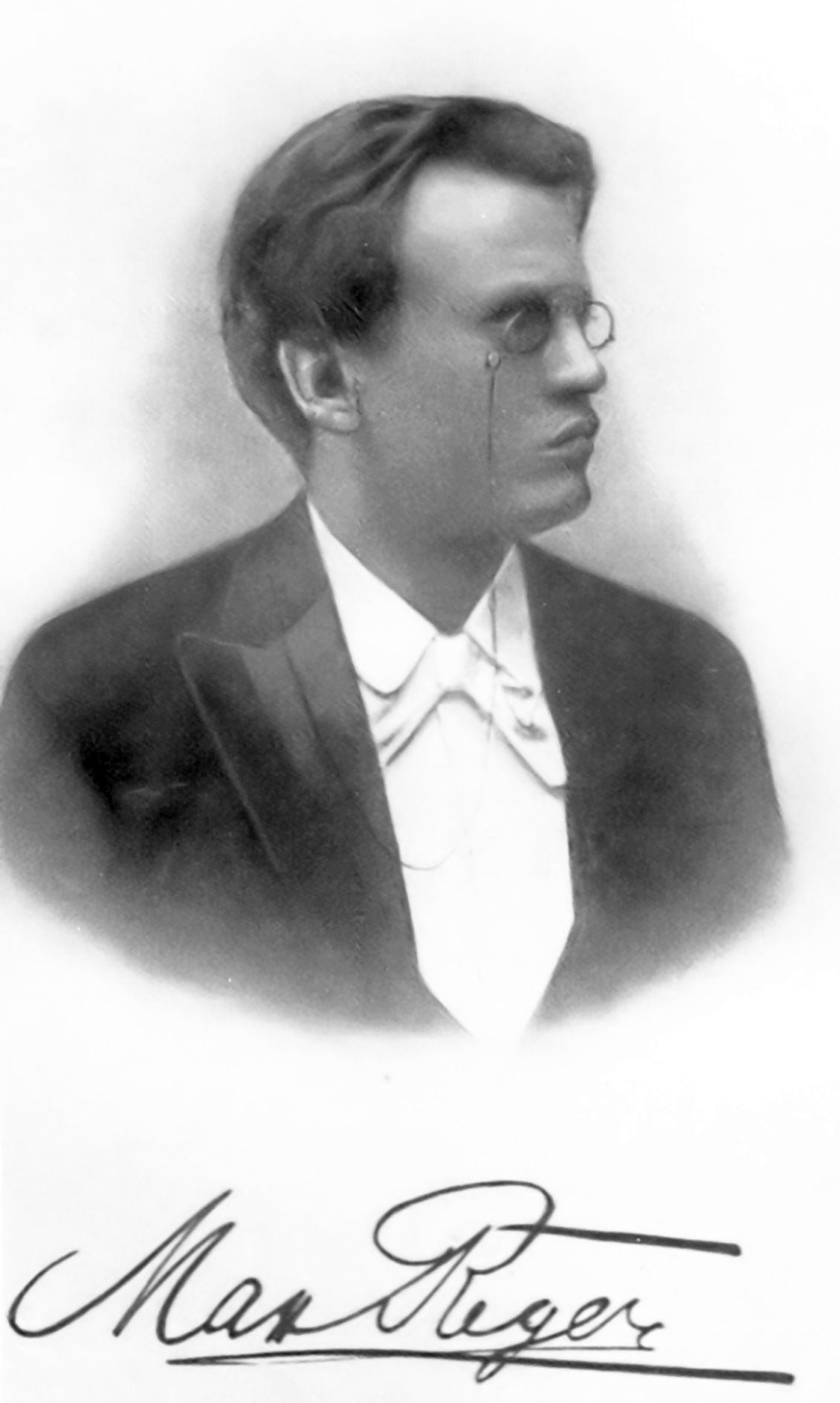
- Reger in 1901
- Opus: 40
- Based on: "Wie schön leucht't uns der Morgenstern"; "Straf mich nicht in deinem Zorn!"
- Composed: 1899
- Dedication: Friedrich Spitta; Paul Gerhardt
- Published: 1900

Zwei Choralphantasien (two chorale fantasias), Op. 40, are fantasias for organ by Max Reger. He composed the fantasias in 1899 on two chorales: "Wie schön leucht't uns der Morgenstern" and "Straf mich nicht in deinem Zorn" They were published by Musikverlag Josef Aibl in Munich in May 1900.

== Background ==
Reger was raised Catholic but was fascinated by the variety of melodies of Protestant hymns, and used quotations from them throughout his life. He composed seven chorale fantasias in Weiden between 1898 and 1900, inspired by a fantasia on "Wie schön leuchtet der Morgenstern", Op. 25 (1895) of his teacher Heinrich Reimann. Reger's fantasias follow Reimann's model of setting individual stanzas, connected by interludes. Reger's works often end in a culminating fugue.

== Pieces ==
=== No. 1 ===
The text of the first chorale was written and composed by Philipp Nicolai, published in 1599. Reger composed the fantasia in Erbendorf and Weiden, in September and October 1899, and dedicated it to Friedrich Spitta. It was first performed in Wesel on 24 October 1899 by Karl Straube. Reger described his fantasia as a program music work (Programmmusikwerk). It was the Reger's first chorale fantasias to end with a Choralapotheose (chorale apotheosis), following 19th-century symphonic conclusions.

=== No. 2 ===
The text of the second chorale is a paraphrase of Psalm 6 by Johann Georg Albinus. Reger composed the fantasia in Weiden in November and December 1899, dedicated to Paul Gerhardt. It was first performed in Brünn on 24 June 1900 by Otto Burkert.

== Autographs ==
The Max-Reger-Institute holds the autographs of both fantasias.

== Editions ==
- Reger, Max. Sämtliche Orgelwerke. Vol. Band 6. Choralfantasien. Wiesbaden/Leipzig/Paris: Breitkopf & Härtel. pp. 91–147.
