= Psalm 7 =

Biblical psalm

- "O LORD my God, in thee do I put my trust"
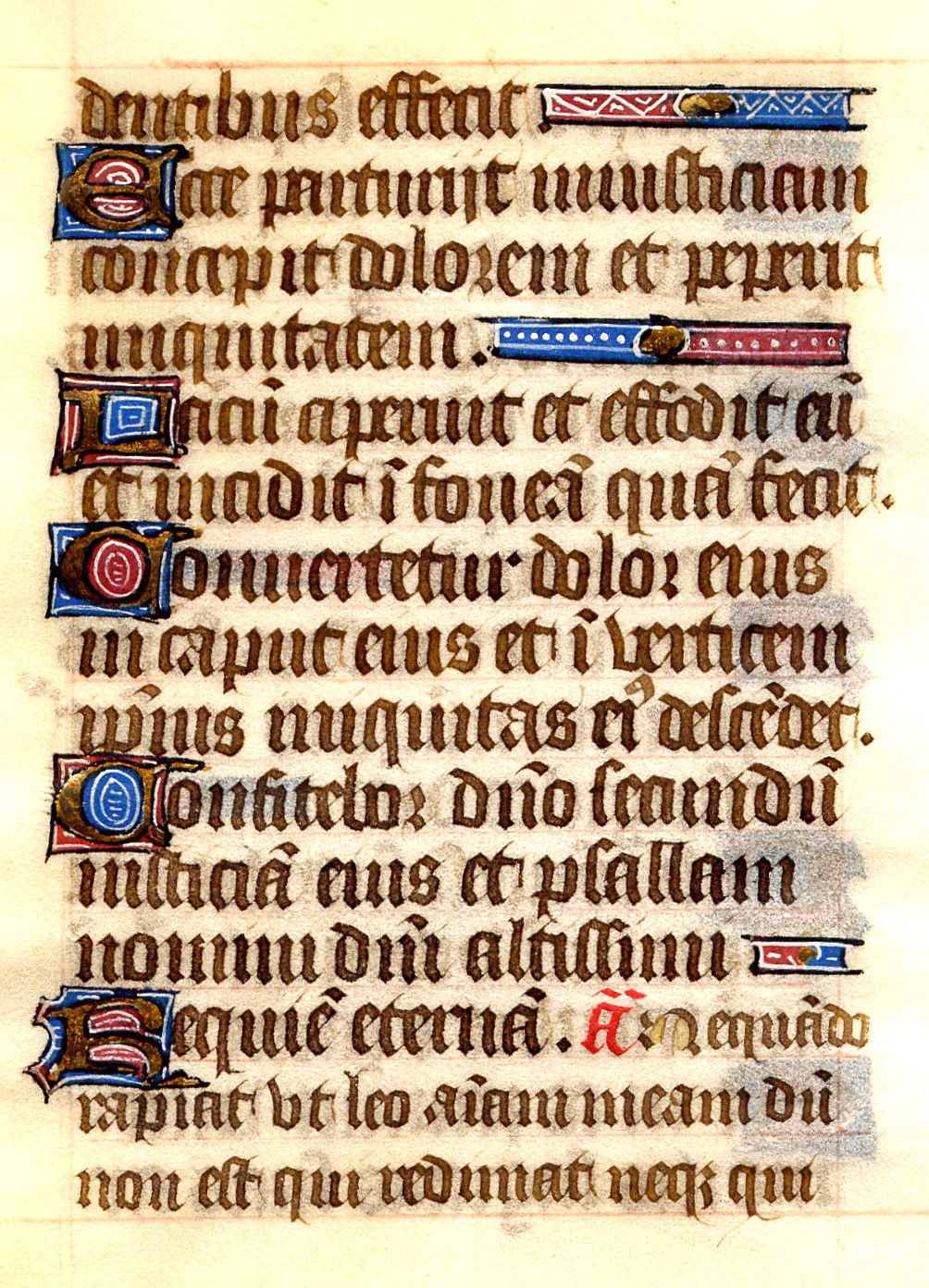
- Psalm 7 from a medieval French manuscript
- Other name: "Domine Deus meus in te speravi "
- Text: by David
- Language: Hebrew (original)

Psalm 7
- ← Psalm 6 Psalm 8 →
- Book: Book of Psalms
- Hebrew Bible part: Ketuvim
- Order in the Hebrew part: 1
- Category: Sifrei Emet
- Christian Bible part: Old Testament
- Order in the Christian part: 19

Psalm 7 is the seventh psalm of the Book of Psalms, beginning in English in the King James Version: "O LORD my God, in thee do I put my trust: save me from all them that persecute me, and deliver me". In Latin, it is known as "Domine Deus meus in te speravi". Its authorship is traditionally assigned to King David. The message in the psalm is that the righteous may seem weak, but ultimately will prevail against the wicked.

The psalm forms a regular part of Jewish, Catholic, Lutheran, Anglican and other Protestant liturgies. It has been set to music, and has inspired hymns.

== Structure ==
The seventh psalm is a Psalm of David, and one of the Lamentations of an individual. A possible outline the psalm is as follows:

- Verse 2f: calling upon God for help
- Verse 4–6: protestation of innocence
- Verse 7–10: achieving desires of the Last Judgment over his enemies
- Verse 11f: comforting certainty to YHWH
- Verse 13–17: Comparison of the wicked enemy the world court
- Verse 18: Vows.

== Superscription ==
A shiggaion of David, which he sang to the Lord concerning Cush, a Benjamite.

This line is verse 1 in Hebrew texts. The Hebrew word shiggayon, which appears in the superscription, is of unknown meaning, perhaps indicating an emotional song.

== Text ==
The following table shows the Hebrew text of the Psalm with vowels, alongside the Koine Greek text in the Septuagint and the English translation from the King James Version. Note that the meaning can slightly differ between these versions, as the Septuagint and the Masoretic Text come from different textual traditions. (Note: A 1917 translation directly from Hebrew to English by the Jewish Publication Society can be found here or here, and an 1844 translation directly from the Septuagint by L. C. L. Brenton can be found here. Both translations are in the public domain.)

#	Hebrew	English	Greek
(Note: In the Jewish verse numbering, the ascription of this psalm is verse 1, and the rest of the psalm begins from verse 2. However, the Christian verse numbering does not count the ascription as a separate verse.)	שִׁגָּי֗וֹן לְדָ֫וִ֥ד אֲשֶׁר־שָׁ֥ר לַֽיהֹוָ֑ה עַל־דִּבְרֵי־כ֝֗וּשׁ בֶּן־יְמִינִֽי׃	(Shiggaion of David, which he sang unto the LORD, concerning the words of Cush the Benjamite.)	Ψαλμὸς τῷ Δαυΐδ, ὃν ᾖσε τῷ Κυρίῳ ὑπὲρ τῶν λόγων Χουσὶ υἱοῦ ᾿Ιεμενεί. -
1	יְהֹוָ֣ה אֱ֭לֹהַי בְּךָ֣ חָסִ֑יתִי הוֹשִׁיעֵ֥נִי מִכׇּל־רֹ֝דְפַ֗י וְהַצִּילֵֽנִי׃	O LORD my God, in thee do I put my trust: save me from all them that persecute me, and deliver me:	ΚΥΡΙΕ ὁ Θεός μου, ἐπὶ σοὶ ἤλπισα· σῶσόν με ἐκ πάντων τῶν διωκόντων με καὶ ῥῦσαί με,
2	פֶּן־יִטְרֹ֣ף כְּאַרְיֵ֣ה נַפְשִׁ֑י פֹּ֝רֵ֗ק וְאֵ֣ין מַצִּֽיל׃	Lest he tear my soul like a lion, rending it in pieces, while there is none to deliver.	μήποτε ἁρπάσῃ ὡς λέων τὴν ψυχήν μου, μὴ ὄντος λυτρουμένου μηδὲ σῴζοντος.
3	יְהֹוָ֣ה אֱ֭לֹהַי אִם־עָשִׂ֣יתִי זֹ֑את אִֽם־יֶשׁ־עָ֥וֶל בְּכַפָּֽי׃	O LORD my God, If I have done this; if there be iniquity in my hands;	Κύριε ὁ Θεός μου, εἰ ἐποίησα τοῦτο, εἰ ἔστιν ἀδικία ἐν χερσί μου,
4	אִם־גָּ֭מַלְתִּי שֽׁוֹלְמִ֥י רָ֑ע וָאֲחַלְּצָ֖ה צֽוֹרְרִ֣י רֵיקָֽם׃	If I have rewarded evil unto him that was at peace with me; (yea, I have delivered him that without cause is mine enemy:)	εἰ ἀνταπέδωκα τοῖς ἀνταποδιδοῦσί μοι κακά, ἀποπέσοιμι ἄρα ἀπὸ τῶν ἐχθρῶν μου κενός·
5	יִ֥רַדֹּֽף־אוֹיֵ֨ב ׀ נַפְשִׁ֡י וְיַשֵּׂ֗ג וְיִרְמֹ֣ס לָאָ֣רֶץ חַיָּ֑י וּכְבוֹדִ֓י ׀ לֶעָפָ֖ר יַשְׁכֵּ֣ן סֶֽלָה׃	Let the enemy persecute my soul, and take it; yea, let him tread down my life upon the earth, and lay mine honour in the dust. Selah.	καταδιώξαι ἄρα ὁ ἐχθρὸς τὴν ψυχήν μου καὶ καταλάβοι καὶ καταπατήσαι εἰς γῆν τὴν ζωήν μου καὶ τὴν δόξαν μου εἰς χοῦν κατασκηνώσαι. (διάψαλμα).
6	ק֘וּמָ֤ה יְהֹוָ֨ה ׀ בְּאַפֶּ֗ךָ הִ֭נָּשֵׂא בְּעַבְר֣וֹת צוֹרְרָ֑י וְע֥וּרָה אֵ֝לַ֗י מִשְׁפָּ֥ט צִוִּֽיתָ׃	Arise, O LORD, in thine anger, lift up thyself because of the rage of mine enemies: and awake for me to the judgment that thou hast commanded.	ἀνάστηθι, Κύριε, ἐν ὀργῇ σου, ὑψώθητι ἐν τοῖς πέρασι τῶν ἐχθρῶν σου. ἐξεγέρθητι, Κύριε ὁ Θεός μου, ἐν προστάγματι, ᾧ ἐνετείλω,
7	וַעֲדַ֣ת לְ֭אֻמִּים תְּסֽוֹבְבֶ֑ךָּ וְ֝עָלֶ֗יהָ לַמָּר֥וֹם שֽׁוּבָה׃	So shall the congregation of the people compass thee about: for their sakes therefore return thou on high.	καὶ συναγωγὴ λαῶν κυκλώσει σε, καὶ ὑπὲρ ταύτης εἰς ὕψος ἐπίστρεψον.
8	יְהֹוָה֮ יָדִ֢ין עַ֫מִּ֥ים שׇׁפְטֵ֥נִי יְהֹוָ֑ה כְּצִדְקִ֖י וּכְתֻמִּ֣י עָלָֽי׃	The LORD shall judge the people: judge me, O LORD, according to my righteousness, and according to mine integrity that is in me.	Κύριος κρινεῖ λαούς. κρῖνόν με, Κύριε, κατὰ τὴν δικαιοσύνην μου καὶ κατὰ τὴν ἀκακίαν μου ἐπ᾿ ἐμοί.
9	יִגְמׇר־נָ֬א רַ֨ע ׀ רְשָׁעִים֮ וּתְכוֹנֵ֢ן צַ֫דִּ֥יק וּבֹחֵ֣ן לִ֭בּוֹת וּכְלָי֗וֹת אֱלֹהִ֥ים צַדִּֽיק׃	Oh let the wickedness of the wicked come to an end; but establish the just: for the righteous God trieth the hearts and reins.	συντελεσθήτω δὴ πονηρία ἁμαρτωλῶν καὶ κατευθυνεῖς δίκαιον, ἐτάζων καρδίας καὶ νεφροὺς ὁ Θεός.
10	מָגִנִּ֥י עַל־אֱלֹהִ֑ים מ֝וֹשִׁ֗יעַ יִשְׁרֵי־לֵֽב׃	My defence is of God, which saveth the upright in heart.	δικαία ἡ βοήθειά μου παρὰ τοῦ Θεοῦ τοῦ σῴζοντος τοὺς εὐθεῖς τῇ καρδίᾳ.
11	אֱ֭לֹהִים שׁוֹפֵ֣ט צַדִּ֑יק וְ֝אֵ֗ל זֹעֵ֥ם בְּכׇל־יֽוֹם׃	God judgeth the righteous, and God is angry with the wicked every day.	ὁ Θεὸς κριτὴς δίκαιος καὶ ἰσχυρὸς καὶ μακρόθυμος καὶ μὴ ὀργὴν ἐπάγων καθ᾿ ἑκάστην ἡμέραν.
12	אִם־לֹ֣א יָ֭שׁוּב חַרְבּ֣וֹ יִלְט֑וֹשׁ קַשְׁתּ֥וֹ דָ֝רַ֗ךְ וַֽיְכוֹנְנֶֽהָ׃	If he turn not, he will whet his sword; he hath bent his bow, and made it ready.	ἐὰν μὴ ἐπιστραφῆτε, τὴν ῥομφαίαν αὐτοῦ στιλβώσει, τὸ τόξον αὐτοῦ ἐνέτεινε καὶ ἡτοίμασεν αὐτό·
13	וְ֭לוֹ הֵכִ֣ין כְּלֵי־מָ֑וֶת חִ֝צָּ֗יו לְֽדֹלְקִ֥ים יִפְעָֽל׃	He hath also prepared for him the instruments of death; he ordaineth his arrows against the persecutors.	καὶ ἐν αὐτῷ ἡτοίμασε σκεύη θανάτου, τὰ βέλη αὐτοῦ τοῖς καιομένοις ἐξειργάσατο.
14	הִנֵּ֥ה יְחַבֶּל־אָ֑וֶן וְהָרָ֥ה עָ֝מָ֗ל וְיָ֣לַד שָֽׁקֶר׃	Behold, he travaileth with iniquity, and hath conceived mischief, and brought forth falsehood.	ἰδοὺ ὠδίνησεν ἀδικίαν, συνέλαβε πόνον καὶ ἔτεκεν ἀνομίαν.
15	בּ֣וֹר כָּ֭רָה וַֽיַּחְפְּרֵ֑הוּ וַ֝יִּפֹּ֗ל בְּשַׁ֣חַת יִפְעָֽל׃	He made a pit, and digged it, and is fallen into the ditch which he made.	λάκκον ὤρυξε καὶ ἀνέσκαψεν αὐτόν, καὶ ἐμπεσεῖται εἰς βόθρον, ὃν εἰργάσατο·
16	יָשׁ֣וּב עֲמָל֣וֹ בְרֹאשׁ֑וֹ וְעַ֥ל קׇ֝דְקֳד֗וֹ חֲמָס֥וֹ יֵרֵֽד׃	His mischief shall return upon his own head, and his violent dealing shall come down upon his own pate.	ἐπιστρέψει ὁ πόνος αὐτοῦ εἰς κεφαλὴν αὐτοῦ, καὶ ἐπὶ κορυφὴν αὐτοῦ ἡ ἀδικία αὐτοῦ καταβήσεται.
17	אוֹדֶ֣ה יְהֹוָ֣ה כְּצִדְק֑וֹ וַ֝אֲזַמְּרָ֗ה שֵֽׁם־יְהֹוָ֥ה עֶלְיֽוֹן׃	I will praise the LORD according to his righteousness: and will sing praise to the name of the LORD most high.	ἐξομολογήσομαι τῷ Κυρίῳ κατὰ τὴν δικαιοσύνην αὐτοῦ καὶ ψαλῶ τῷ ὀνόματι Κυρίου τοῦ ῾Υψίστου.

== Uses ==
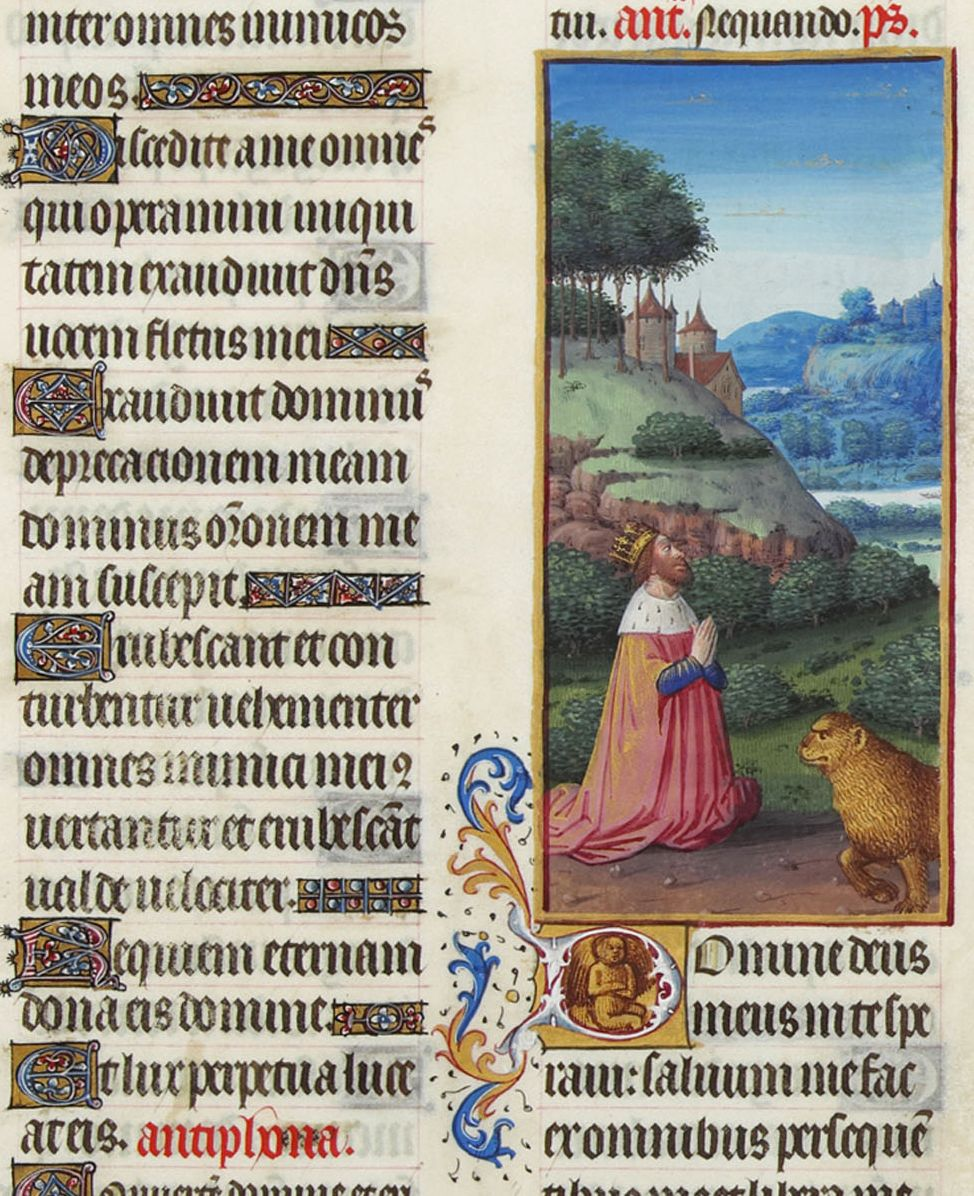
Psalm 7 in Les Très Riches Heures du duc de Berry, Folio 88r - Psalm VII in the Musée Condé, Chantilly

=== Judaism ===
Psalm 7 is recited on Purim.

=== In Protestant revivalism ===
Jonathan Edwards used some of the imagery from Psalm 7 in his 1741 sermon Sinners in the Hands of an Angry God.

Psalm 7:12–13 was used in Sinners in the Hands of an Angry God as:

The bow of God's wrath is bent, and the arrow made ready on the string,
and justice bends the arrow at your heart,
and strains the bow, and it is nothing but the mere pleasure of God,
and that of an angry God, without any promise
or obligation at all, that keeps the arrow one moment
from being made drunk with your blood.

A takeoff on this imagery used by the book by Brian Zahnd is Sinners in the hands of a loving God.

The arrow imagery will occur 15 times in Psalms, of God, of His enemies and even of children of blessed people.

=== Catholicism ===
Around 530, St. Benedict of Nursia choose this psalm for the Tuesday office of Prime. According to the rule of St. Benedict, it was the first of three psalms. This tradition is still respected in a number of monasteries.

In the Liturgy of the Hours, Psalm 7 is recited during the Office of Midday on Mondays in the first week of the four weekly cycle of liturgical prayers.

=== Book of Common Prayer ===
In the Church of England's Book of Common Prayer, this psalm is appointed to be read on the evening of the first day of the month.

== Musical settings ==
Heinrich Schütz wrote a setting of a paraphrase of Psalm 7 in German, "Auf dich trau ich, mein Herr und Gott", SWV 103, for the Becker Psalter, published first in 1628.

== Illuminated manuscripts ==
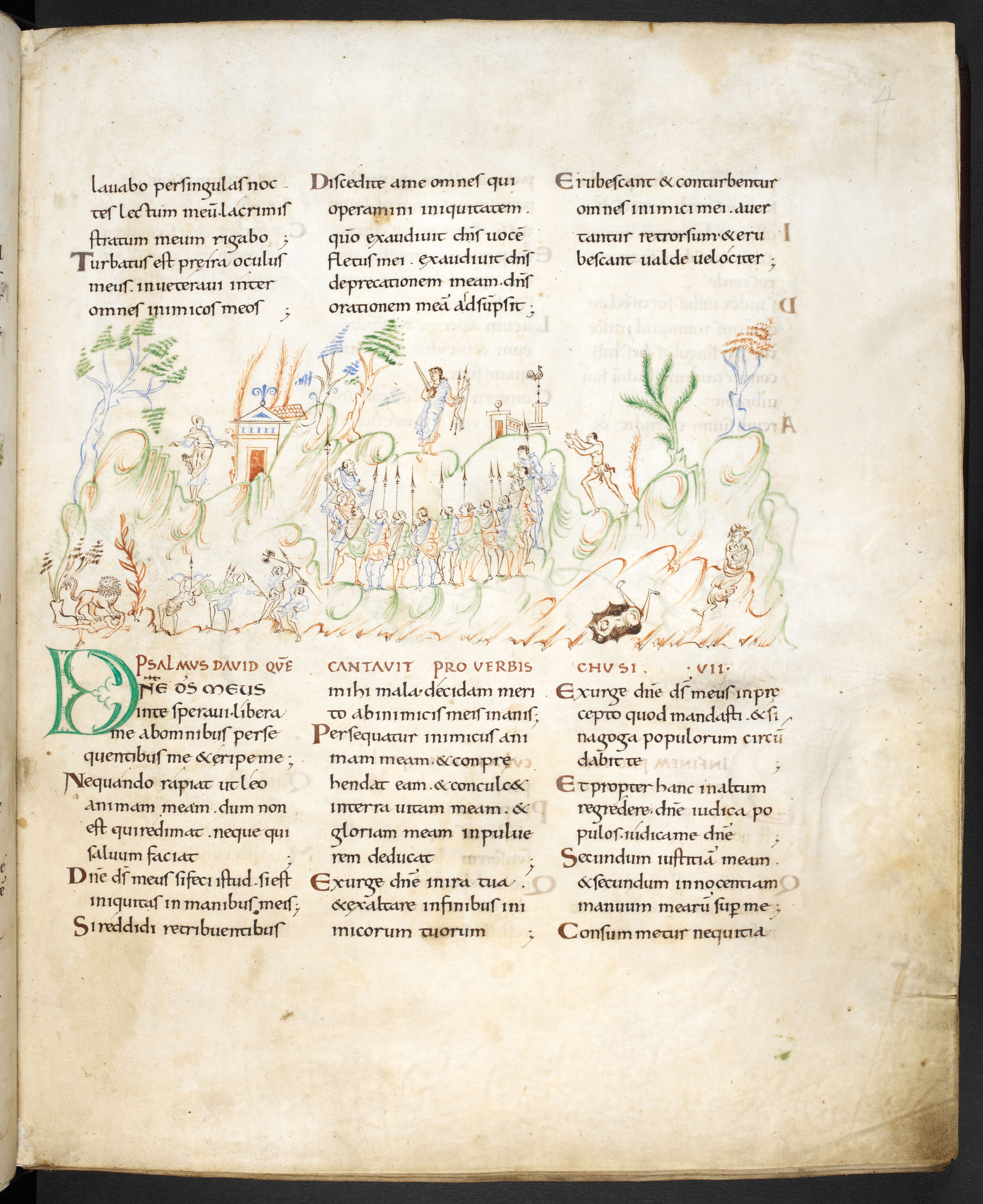
Harley Psalter

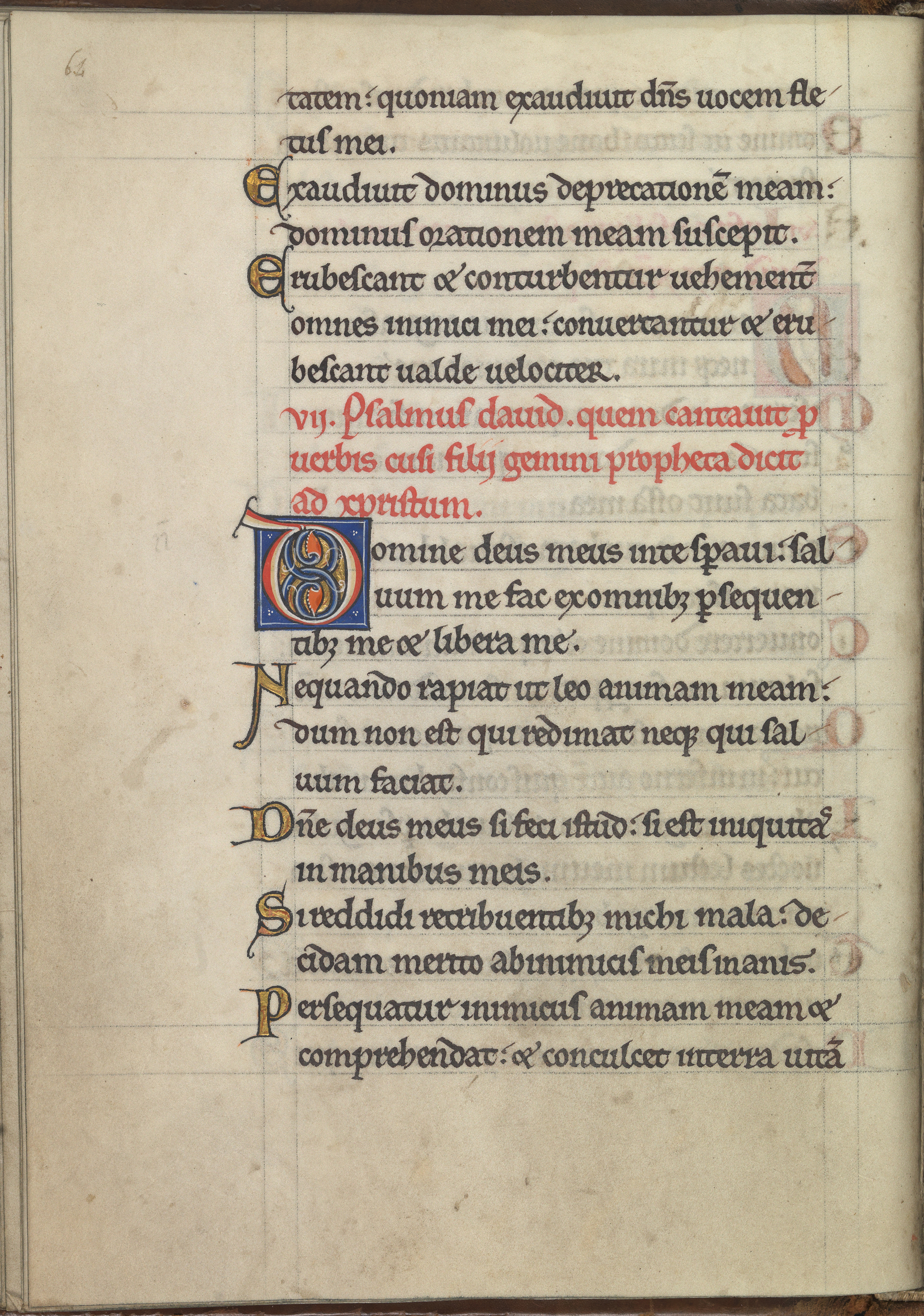
Fecamp Psalter

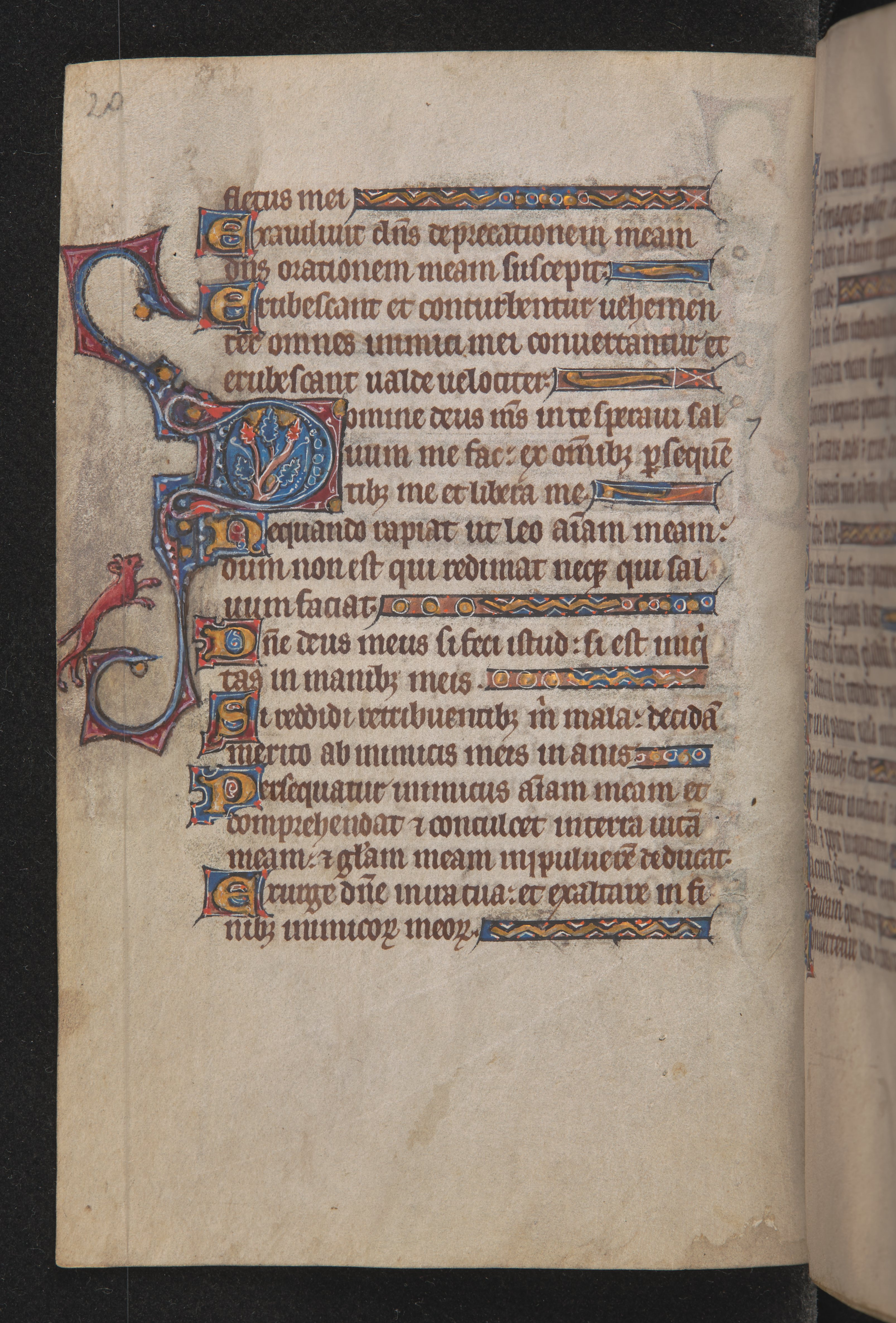
A 14th-century French psalter
