= Mache dich, mein Geist, bereit, BWV 115 =

1724 chorale cantata by Johann Sebastian Bach

Mache dich, mein Geist, bereit
- BWV 115
- Chorale cantata by J. S. Bach
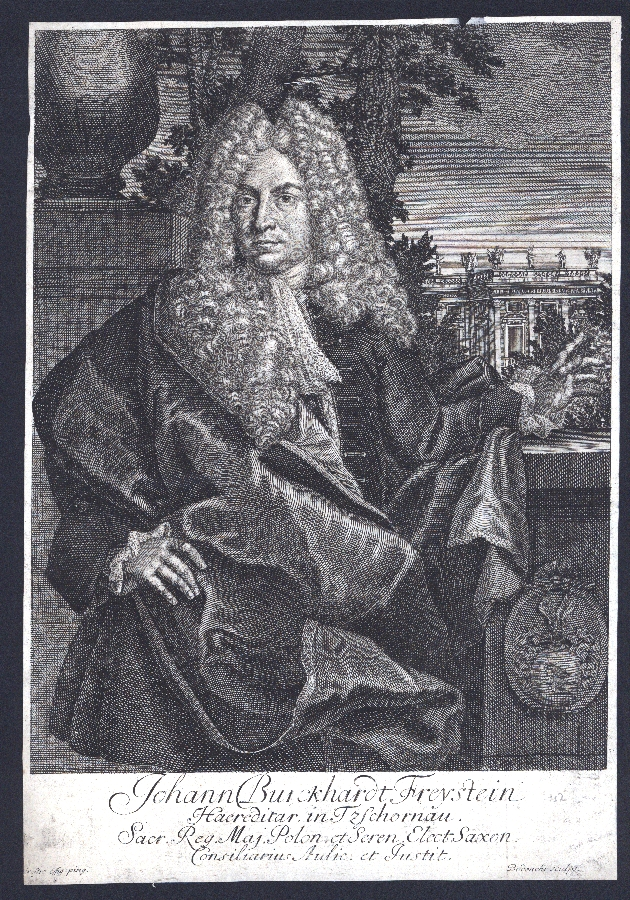
- Portrait of Johann Burchard Freystein, the author of the hymn
- Occasion: 22nd Sunday after Trinity
- Chorale: "Mache dich, mein Geist, bereit" by Johann Burchard Freystein
- Performed: 5 November 1724: Leipzig
- Movements: 6
- Vocal: SATB choir and solo
- Instrumental: horn; flauto traverso; oboe d'amore; 2 violins; viola; violoncello piccolo; continuo

Johann Sebastian Bach composed the church cantata Mache dich, mein Geist, bereit (Make yourself ready, my spirit), BWV 115, in Leipzig for the 22nd Sunday after Trinity and first performed it on 5 November 1724. It is based on the 1695 hymn of the same name by Johann Burchard Freystein.

Mache dich, mein Geist, bereit belongs to Bach's chorale cantata cycle, the second cycle during his tenure as Thomaskantor that began in 1723. The text of the hymn is retained for the first and last stanzas unchanged, while the text of inner stanzas was paraphrased by an unknown librettist into a sequence of alternating arias and recitatives. The first movement is a chorale fantasia, and the work is closed by a four-part chorale setting.

The cantata is scored for four vocal soloists, a four-part choir, and a Baroque instrumental ensemble of horn to double the soprano in the chorale, flauto traverso, oboe d'amore, strings including violoncello piccolo and basso continuo.

== History and words ==
Bach composed the cantata in his second year in Leipzig for the 22nd Sunday after Trinity. That year, Bach composed a cycle of chorale cantatas, begun on the first Sunday after Trinity of 1724. The prescribed readings for the Sunday were from the Epistle to the Philippians, thanks and prayer for the congregation in Philippi (Philippians 1:3–11), and from the Gospel of Matthew, the parable of the unforgiving servant (Matthew 18:23–35).

The cantata is based on a hymn in ten stanzas by Johann Burchard Freystein, published in 1695, which expands a single theme related to the Gospel: be prepared by awareness and prayer for the arrival of the Lord. An unknown poet retained the first and the last stanza as movements 1 and 6 of the cantata. He derived the inner movements as a sequence of alternating arias and recitatives from the inner stanzas, using stanza 2 for 2, stanzas 3 to 6 for 3, stanza 7 for 4, keeping the first two lines unchanged, and stanzas 8 to 9 for 5. The chorale is sung to the anonymous melody of "Straf mich nicht in deinem Zorn" from the 17th century, of secular origin.

Bach led the Thomanerchor in the first performance of the cantata on 5 November 1724.

== Music ==
=== Structure and scoring ===
Bach structured the cantata in six movements. Both text and tune of the hymn are retained in the outer movements, a chorale fantasia and a four-part closing chorale. Bach scored the work for four vocal soloists (soprano (S), alto (A), tenor (T) and bass (B)), a four-part choir, and a Baroque instrumental ensemble of horn (Co) to double the soprano in the chorale, flauto traverso (Ft), oboe d'amore (Oa), two violin parts (Vl), one viola part (Va), violoncell piccolo (Vp), and basso continuo.

In the following table of the movements, the scoring, keys and time signatures are taken from Alfred Dürr's standard work Die Kantaten von Johann Sebastian Bach. The continuo, which plays throughout, is not shown.

Movements of Mache dich, mein Geist, bereit
No.	Title	Text	Type	Vocal	Winds	Strings	Key	Time
1	Mache dich, mein Geist, bereit	Freystein	Chorale fantasia	SATB	Co Ft Oa	2Vl Va	D minor	6/4
2	Ach schläfrige Seele, wie? ruhest du noch?	anon.	Aria	A	Oa	Vl Va	E minor	3/8
3	Gott, so vor deine Seele wacht	anon.	Recitative	B				common time
4	Bete aber auch dabei	anon.	Aria	S	Ft	Vp	B minor	common time
5	Er sehnet sich nach unserm Schreien	anon.	Recitative	T				common time
6	Drum so laßt uns immerdar	Freystein	Chorale	SATB	Co Ft Oa	2Vl Va	G major	common time

=== Movements ===
==== 1 ====
The opening chorus, "Mache dich, mein Geist, bereit, wache, fleh und bete" (Make yourself ready, my spirit, be vigilant, plead, and pray), is a chorale fantasia in the form of a passacaglia. The instruments perform independent concertante chamber music, set for a quartet: the flute, the oboe d'amore, the strings in unison and basso continuo. The soprano sings the melody as a cantus firmus, the lower voices are set partly in imitation, partly in homophony.

==== 2 ====
The alto aria, "Ach schläfrige Seele, wie? ruhest du noch? Ermuntre dich doch!" (Oh, sleepy soul, how? Do you still rest? Arouse yourself now!), begins, as Klaus Hofmann noted, "as a musical sleep scene of a kind that could have graced any opera of the time". Marked Adagio, the oboe d'amore plays a solo in siciliano rhythm, leading to a "long, peaceful, quasi-'sleeping' note", supported by "tranquil basslines". The text's admonition to be vigilant, "Judgment might abruptly awaken you", appears in the contrasting middle section, marked Allegro.

==== 3 ====
The bass recitative, "Gott, so vor deine Seele wacht, hat Abscheu an der Sünden Nacht" (God, who watches over your soul, has disgust for the night of sin), is set as a secco recitative.

==== 4 ====
The soprano aria, "Bete aber auch dabei mitten in dem Wachen!" (Pray nevertheless also during your vigil!), uses these two lines from the original hymn. Flute and violoncello piccolo play chamber music, to which the solo adds what Hofmann describes as a "noble cantilena". It is marked Molto adagio, and is built on mostly descending basslines.

==== 5 ====
The secco recitative for tenor, "Er sehnet sich nach unserm Schreien, er neigt sein gnädig Ohr hierauf" (He yearns for our cries, he bends his gracious ear to them), refers to Jesus coming to help.

==== 6 ====
The closing chorale, "Drum so laßt uns immerdar wachen, flehen, beten" (Therefore, let us always watch, plead, and pray), is a four-part setting of the final call to remain alert always. The lower voices, especially the bass, are unusually lively in their movement.

== Recordings ==
A list of recordings is provided on the Bach Cantatas Website. Ensembles playing period instruments in historically informed performances are shown with a green background.

Recordings of Mache dich, mein Geist, bereit
Title	Conductor / Choir / Orchestra	Soloists	Label	Year	Orch. type
Bach Cantatas Vol. 5	Karl Richter Münchener Bach-Chor Münchener Bach-Orchester	Edith Mathis; Trudeliese Schmidt; Peter Schreier; Dietrich Fischer-Dieskau	Archiv Produktion	1978	
J. S. Bach: Das Kantatenwerk • Complete Cantatas • Les Cantates, Folge / Vol. 29	Nikolaus Harnoncourt Tölzer Knabenchor Concentus Musicus Wien	soloist of the Tölzer Knabenchor; Paul Esswood; Kurt Equiluz; Philippe Huttenlocher	Teldec	1979	Period
Die Bach Kantate Vol. 57	Helmuth Rilling Gächinger Kantorei Bach-Collegium Stuttgart	Arleen Augér; Helen Watts; Lutz-Michael Harder; Wolfgang Schöne	Hänssler	1980	
J. S. Bach: Cantatas with Violoncelle Piccolo	Christophe Coin Das Leipziger Concerto Vocale Ensemble Baroque de Limoges	Barbara Schlick; Andreas Scholl; Christoph Prégardien; Gotthold Schwarz	Auvidis Astrée	1993	Period
J. S. Bach: Complete Cantatas Vol. 11	Ton Koopman Amsterdam Baroque Orchestra & Choir	Lisa Larsson; Annette Markert; Christoph Prégardien; Klaus Mertens	Antoine Marchand	1999	Period
Bach Edition Vol. 11 – Cantatas Vol. 5	Pieter Jan Leusink Holland Boys Choir Netherlands Bach Collegium	Marjon Strijk; Sytse Buwalda; Nico van der Meel; Bas Ramselaar	Brilliant Classics	1999	Period
Bach Cantatas Vol. 12: Tooting/Winchester	John Eliot Gardiner Monteverdi Choir English Baroque Soloists	Joanne Lunn; Robin Tyson; James Gilchrist; Peter Harvey	Soli Deo Gloria	2000	Period
J. S. Bach: Cantatas Vol. 27 Cantatas from Leipzig 1724 – BWV 5, 80, 115	Masaaki Suzuki Bach Collegium Japan	Susanne Rydén; Pascal Bertin; Gerd Türk; Peter Kooy	BIS	2003	Period
