= Psalm 6 =

Biblical text

- "O LORD, rebuke me not in thine anger"
- Penitential Psalm
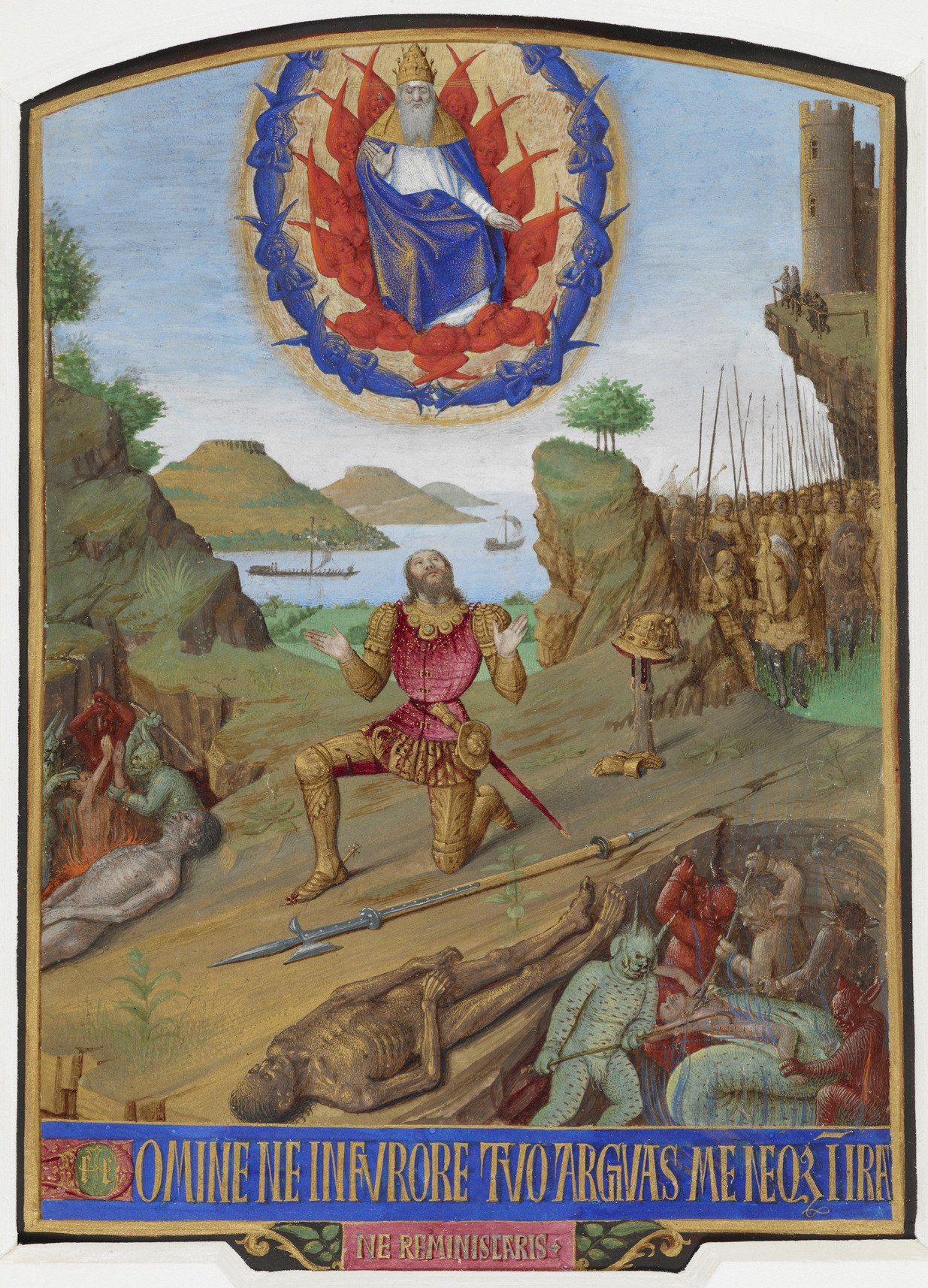
- Psalm 6 in an illumination from the Hours of Étienne Chevalier (by Jean Fouquet, c. 1450). (Note: David, in armour, kneels in penitence before God encircled by cherubim, while in the foreground lies a corpse, with devils torturing souls. Below, in gold capitals on a blue ground, are the opening words of Psalm 6: Domine ne in furore tuo arguas me neque in ira tua corripias me – "Lord, rebuke me not in thine anger, neither chastise me in thy wrath.")
- Other name: "Domine ne in furore tuo arguas me"
- Text: attributed to David
- Language: Hebrew (original)

Psalm 6
- ← Psalm 5 Psalm 7 →
- Book: Book of Psalms
- Hebrew Bible part: Ketuvim
- Order in the Hebrew part: 1
- Category: Sifrei Emet
- Christian Bible part: Old Testament
- Order in the Christian part: 19

Psalm 6 is the sixth psalm of the Book of Psalms, beginning in English in the King James Version: "O LORD, rebuke me not in thine anger, neither chasten me in thy hot displeasure". In Latin, it is known as "Domine ne in furore tuo arguas me". This penitential psalm is traditionally attributed to David.

The psalm forms a regular part of Jewish, Catholic, Lutheran, Anglican and other Protestant liturgies. It was paraphrased to a metred hymn in German, "Straf mich nicht in deinem Zorn" by Johann Georg Albinus, which Catherine Winkworth translated into "Not in anger, Mighty God". The psalm has been set to music by composers such as Heinrich Schütz, Johann Sebastian Bach, Max Reger, Jules Van Nuffel and Norma Wendelburg.

== Translations ==
Several significant translations can be identified from the early modern period. In 1532, Marguerite de Navarre, a woman of French nobility, included the sixth psalm of David in the new editions of the popular Miroir de l’âme pécheresse ("The Mirror of a Sinful Soul"). The psalm would also be later translated by the future Elizabeth I of England in 1544, when Elizabeth was eleven years old. Many feel that the penitential Psalm had a reformation orientation to the readers of the day.

== Themes ==
Psalm 6 is supposed to have been written to serve as a prayer for anyone suffering from sickness or distress or for the state of the Kingdom of Israel while suffering through oppression.

The Geneva Bible (1599) gives the following summary:

When David by his sins had provoked God’s wrath, and now felt not only his hand against him, but also conceived the horrors of death everlasting, he desireth forgiveness. 6 Bewailing that if God took him away in his indignation, he should lack occasion to praise him as he was wont to do while he was among men. 9 Then suddenly feeling God’s mercy, he sharply rebuketh his enemies which rejoiced in his affliction.

The psalm is the first of the seven Penitential Psalms, as identified by Cassiodorus in a commentary of the 6th century AD. Many translations have been made of these psalms, and musical settings have been made by many composers. From Augustine's Enarrationes until Eduard König and the advent of the form-critical method in the early 20th century, this was considered one of the penitential psalms. Since then, Hermann Gunkel has classed it as one of the Individual Lamentations, as one of the"Sick Psalms". German scholar Antonius Kuckhoff considers this psalm to be the "paradigmatic example" of the supplication form in the psalms.

For Martin Luther, the 6th Psalm was very important. It illustrated various central points of his theology.

Psalm 6 is in three parts, distinguished by the person:

1. First, the psalmist addresses God and
2. then he speaks for himself, and
3. finally he speaks to his enemies.

The psalmist expresses his distress in parts 1 and 2 and uses a rich palette of words to describe this distress: "powerless", "bone shaking" (verse 2), "extreme distress". He even expresses his distress by the excessiveness of "a bed wet with tears", and an "eye consumed because of grief".

In stating the enemies of the Psalmist, we understand that this distress is caused by relational problem. But it is unclear if he is innocent. However, he says he will be reinstated and that his opponents will be confounded. Trouble seems primarily psychological, but is also expressed through the body. It is as much the body as the soul of the psalmist cries out to God. In fact, it is also touched in his spiritual being, faced with the abandonment of God. In the absence of God emerges the final hope of the Psalmist, expressed confidence cry in the last three verses.

=== Heading ===
The Psalm header can be interpreted in different ways:

- As an indication for the conductor
- for the musical performance (stringed instruments)
- eschatological in view of the end times (which lowers the potentially incorrect translation of the Septuagint close)

== Text ==
The following table shows the Hebrew text of the Psalm with vowels, alongside the Koine Greek text in the Septuagint and the English translation from the King James Version. Note that the meaning can slightly differ between these versions, as the Septuagint and the Masoretic Text come from different textual traditions. (Note: A 1917 translation directly from Hebrew to English by the Jewish Publication Society can be found here or here, and an 1844 translation directly from the Septuagint by L. C. L. Brenton can be found here. Both translations are in the public domain.)

#	Hebrew	English	Greek
(Note: In the Jewish verse numbering, the ascription of this psalm is verse 1, and the rest of the psalm begins from verse 2. However, the Christian verse numbering does not count the ascription as a separate verse.)	לַמְנַצֵּ֣חַ בִּ֭נְגִינוֹת עַֽל־הַשְּׁמִינִ֗ית מִזְמ֥וֹר לְדָוִֽד׃	(To the chief Musician on Neginoth upon Sheminith, A Psalm of David.)	Εἰς τὸ τέλος, ἐν ὕμνοις, ὑπὲρ τῆς ὀγδόης· ψαλμὸς τῷ Δαυΐδ. -
1	יְֽהֹוָ֗ה אַל־בְּאַפְּךָ֥ תוֹכִיחֵ֑נִי וְֽאַל־בַּחֲמָתְךָ֥ תְיַסְּרֵֽנִי׃	O LORD, rebuke me not in thine anger, neither chasten me in thy hot displeasure.	ΚΥΡΙΕ, μὴ τῷ θυμῷ σου ἐλέγξῃς με, μηδὲ τῇ ὀργῇ σου παιδεύσῃς με.
2	חׇנֵּ֥נִי יְהֹוָה֮ כִּ֤י אֻמְלַ֫ל־אָ֥נִי רְפָאֵ֥נִי יְהֹוָ֑ה כִּ֖י נִבְהֲל֣וּ עֲצָמָֽי׃	Have mercy upon me, O LORD; for I am weak: O LORD, heal me; for my bones are vexed.	ἐλέησόν με, Κύριε, ὅτι ἀσθενής εἰμι· ἴασαί με, Κύριε, ὅτι ἐταράχθη τὰ ὀστᾶ μου,
3	וְ֭נַפְשִׁי נִבְהֲלָ֣ה מְאֹ֑ד (ואת) [וְאַתָּ֥ה] יְ֝הֹוָ֗ה עַד־מָתָֽי׃	My soul is also sore vexed: but thou, O LORD, how long?	καὶ ἡ ψυχή μου ἐταράχθη σφόδρα· καὶ σύ, Κύριε, ἕως πότε;
4	שׁוּבָ֣ה יְ֭הֹוָה חַלְּצָ֣ה נַפְשִׁ֑י ה֝וֹשִׁיעֵ֗נִי לְמַ֣עַן חַסְדֶּֽךָ׃	Return, O LORD, deliver my soul: oh save me for thy mercies' sake.	ἐπίστρεψον, Κύριε, ῥῦσαι τὴν ψυχήν μου, σῶσόν με ἕνεκεν τοῦ ἐλέους σου.
5	כִּ֤י אֵ֣ין בַּמָּ֣וֶת זִכְרֶ֑ךָ בִּ֝שְׁא֗וֹל מִ֣י יֽוֹדֶה־לָּֽךְ׃	For in death there is no remembrance of thee: in the grave who shall give thee thanks?	ὅτι οὐκ ἔστιν ἐν τῷ θανάτῳ ὁ μνημονεύων σου· ἐν δὲ τῷ ῞ᾼδῃ τίς ἐξομολογήσεταί σοι;
6	יָגַ֤עְתִּי ׀ בְּֽאַנְחָתִ֗י אַשְׂחֶ֣ה בְכׇל־לַ֭יְלָה מִטָּתִ֑י בְּ֝דִמְעָתִ֗י עַרְשִׂ֥י אַמְסֶֽה׃	I am weary with my groaning; all the night make I my bed to swim; I water my couch with my tears.	ἐκοπίασα ἐν τῷ στεναγμῷ μου, λούσω καθ᾿ ἑκάστην νύκτα τὴν κλίνην μου, ἐν δάκρυσί μου τὴν στρωμνήν μου βρέξω.
7	עָשְׁשָׁ֣ה מִכַּ֣עַס עֵינִ֑י עָ֝תְקָ֗ה בְּכׇל־צוֹרְרָֽי׃	Mine eye is consumed because of grief; it waxeth old because of all mine enemies.	ἐταράχθη ἀπὸ θυμοῦ ὁ ὀφθαλμός μου, ἐπαλαιώθην ἐν πᾶσι τοῖς ἐχθροῖς μου.
8	ס֣וּרוּ מִ֭מֶּנִּי כׇּל־פֹּ֣עֲלֵי אָ֑וֶן כִּֽי־שָׁמַ֥ע יְ֝הֹוָ֗ה ק֣וֹל בִּכְיִֽי׃	Depart from me, all ye workers of iniquity; for the LORD hath heard the voice of my weeping.	ἀπόστητε ἀπ᾿ ἐμοῦ πάντες οἱ ἐργαζόμενοι τὴν ἀνομίαν, ὅτι εἰσήκουσε Κύριος τῆς φωνῆς τοῦ κλαυθμοῦ μου·
9	שָׁמַ֣ע יְ֭הֹוָה תְּחִנָּתִ֑י יְ֝הֹוָ֗ה תְּֽפִלָּתִ֥י יִקָּֽח׃	The LORD hath heard my supplication; the LORD will receive my prayer.	ἤκουσε Κύριος τῆς δεήσεώς μου, Κύριος τὴν προσευχήν μου προσεδέξατο.
10	יֵבֹ֤שׁוּ ׀ וְיִבָּהֲל֣וּ מְ֭אֹד כׇּל־אֹיְבָ֑י יָ֝שֻׁ֗בוּ יֵבֹ֥שׁוּ רָֽגַע׃	Let all mine enemies be ashamed and sore vexed: let them return and be ashamed suddenly.	αἰσχυνθείησαν καὶ ταραχθείησαν σφόδρα πάντες οἱ ἐχθροί μου, ἀποστραφείησαν καὶ καταισχυνθείησαν σφόδρα διὰ τάχους.

== Uses ==
=== Judaism ===
- In Nusach Ashkenaz and most Nusach Sefard communities, the Psalm (omitting verse 1) is recited as part of Tachnun.

=== New Testament ===
Some verses of Psalm 6 are referenced in the New Testament:

- Verse 3a: in John 12:27.
- Verse 8 in Matthew 7:23; Luke 13:27.

In the Psalms almost all lament Psalms end with an upturn and here the upturn is a statement of confidence in being heard. Psalm 6:8–10. The sorrowful prayer models lamenting with an attitude of being heard, as seen in Hebrews 5:7.

=== Catholicism ===
According to the Rule of St. Benedict (530 AD), Psalm 1 to Psalm 20 were mainly reserved for the office of Prime. According to the Rule of St. Benedict, (530) it was used on Monday, in the Prime after Psalm 1 and Psalm 25. In the Liturgy of the Hours as well, Psalm 6 is recited or sung to the Office of Readings for Monday of the first week.

=== Book of Common Prayer ===
In the Church of England's Book of Common Prayer, this psalm is appointed to be read on the evening of the first day of the month, as well as at Mattins on Ash Wednesday.

=== Coptic Orthodox Church ===
In the Agpeya, the Coptic Church's book of hours, this psalm is prayed in the office of Prime, and the first watch of the Midnight office. It is also in the prayer of the Veil, which is generally prayed only by monks.

=== Ethiopian Orthodox Tewahedo Church ===
Verse 1 (which is almost identical to verse 1 of Psalm 38) is quoted in chapter 6 of 1 Meqabyan, a book considered canonical by this church.

=== Music ===
Heinrich Schütz set two different metred hymns paraphrasing Psalm 6, "Ach, Herr, straf mich nicht", SWV 24, included in his Psalmen Davids, Op. 2 (1619), and "Ach Herr mein Gott, straf mich doch nicht", SWV 102, as part of his Becker Psalter settings, Op. 5 (1628). "Herr, straf mich nicht in deinem Zorn / Das bitt ich dich von Herzen" (not to be confused with "Herr, straf mich nicht in deinem Zorn / Lass mich dein Grimm verzehren nicht", a paraphrase of Psalm 38) is a German paraphrase of Psalm 6, set by, among others, Johann Crüger (1640, Zahn No. 4606a). Settings based on Crüger's hymn tune were included in the Neu Leipziger Gesangbuch, and composed by Johann Sebastian Bach (BWV 338).

Psalm 6 also formed the basis of the metred hymn "Straf mich nicht in deinem Zorn" (Do not punish me in your anger) by Johann Georg Albinus (1686, excerpt; EKG 176), which Catherine Winkworth translated into "Not in anger, Mighty God". The French composer Henry Desmarets used the psalm "Domine ne in furore" (1713) in the work Grands Motets Lorrains.

Max Reger composed a chorale fantasia for organ, one of his two Zwei Choralphantasien, Op. 40, in 1899, as his Op. 40. Jules Van Nuffel set the psalm in Latin in 1935 as his Op. 44. Alan Hovhaness set verses 1-4 in his opus 28 O Lord, Rebuke Me Not. In 1973, Norma Wendelburg wrote a setting in English, "My Lord, Chastise Me Not in Anger", for mixed chorus and optional organ.

== Psalm 6 in medieval illumination ==
The psalm was frequently chosen for illumination in medieval Books of Hours, to open the section containing the penitential psalms.

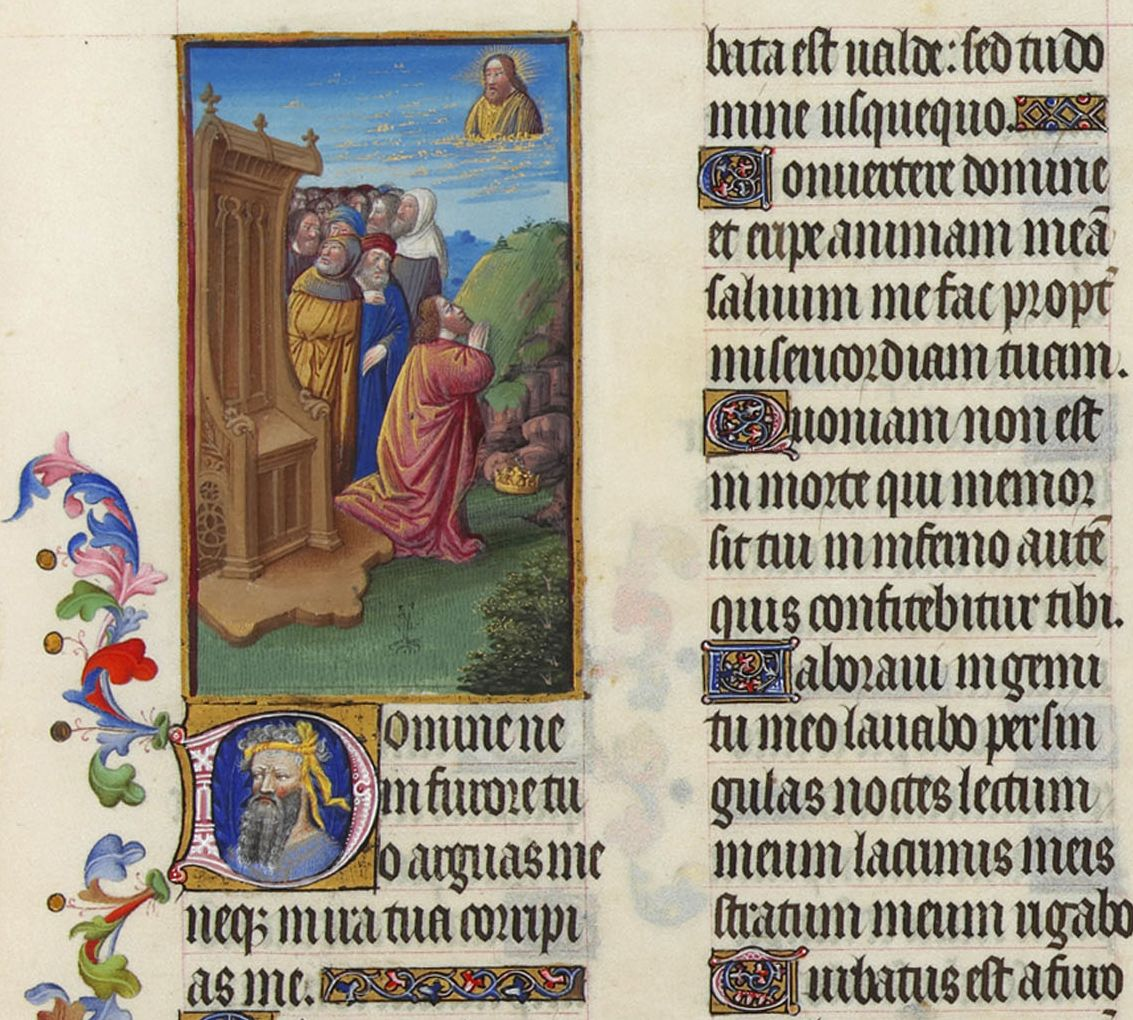
The Très Riches Heures du Duc de Berry (15th century)

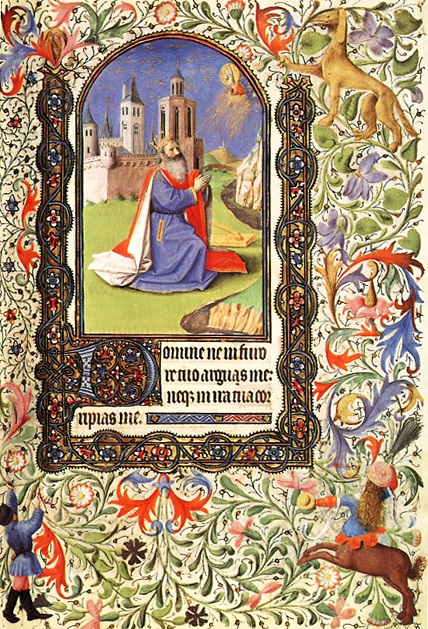
A Book of Hours from Namur

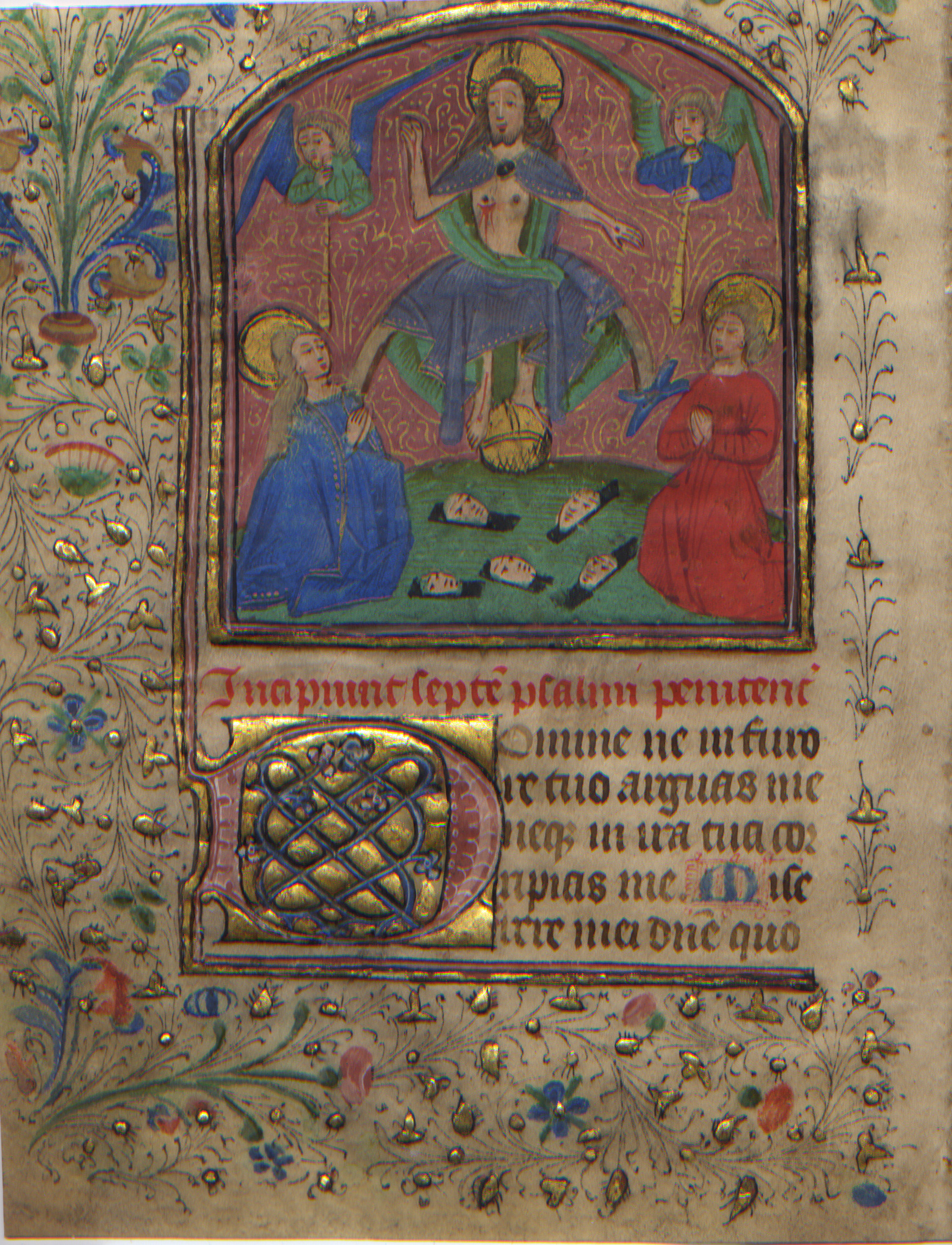
A 15th-century Book of Hours from the south of France. Surrounding the penitents are the dead in their graves.
