= Norma Wendelburg =

American musician

- Born: Norma Ruth Wendelburg; March 26, 1918; Stafford, Kansas, U.S.
- Died: July 26, 2016 (aged 98)
- Education: Bethany College (Kansas); University of Michigan; Mozarteum; Vienna Academy of Music
- Occupations: Pianist; Composer; Academic teacher
- Organizations: Wayne State College; Bethany College; Hardin–Simmons University; Southwest Texas State University; Dallas Baptist College; Iowa State Teachers College

Norma Ruth Wendelburg (March 26, 1918 – July 26, 2016) was an American composer, Fulbright scholar, pianist and teacher.

== Life ==
Wendelburg was born in Stafford, Kansas, and won a scholarship to Bethany College (Kansas) where she received a B.M. degree. Wendelburg received a M.M. degree from the University of Michigan, where she studied composition with Ross Lee Finney and Homer Keller, and piano with John Kollen. In 1948, she received a fellowship from the Wellesley Composers Conference and Chamber Music Center, where she studied with Otto Luening and Ingolf Dahl. She attended the Tanglewood Music Center in 1953 on scholarship and studied with Carlos Chavez. As a Fulbright scholar from 1953 to 1955, Wendelburg studied with Cesar Bresgen at the Mozarteum in Salzburg, and with Karl Schiske at the Academy of Music in Vienna. She received her Ph.D. from Eastman School of Music in 1969, where she held a research fellowship and studied with Wayne Barlow and Bernard Rogers.

Wendelburg belonged to the music fraternity Sigma Alpha Iota and the American Society of Composers, Authors, and Publishers (ASCAP). She received fellowships from the MacDowell Colony and the Huntington Hartford Foundation.

Over the years, Wendelburg taught at Wayne State College (Nebraska); her alma mater Bethany College; Hardin-Simmons University (Texas); Southwest Texas State University; Dallas Baptist College; and Iowa State Teacher's College (today known as the University of North Iowa). While teaching at Iowa State Teacher's College, she was named one of America's outstanding young composers by a committee that included composers Walter Piston and William Schuman.

== Compositions ==
=== Chamber ===
- Affirmation (trombone and piano)
- Concenter (clarinet and piano; 1971)
- Andante and allegro (woodwind quartet; 1951)
- Echo and Narcissus (flute)
- Fantasy (trumpet and piano)
- Festival Piece (brass and tympani; 1959)
- Five Duos for Flute and Clarinet
- Four Dances (three woodwinds; 1958)
- Monologue (violin and piano)
- Clarinet Sonata
- Sonatina (oboe and piano; 1951)
- String Quartet No. 1 (1952)
- String Quartet No. 2 (1956)
- Suite No. 1 (violin and piano; 1951)
- Suite No. 2 (violin and piano; 1964)
- To Nature (violin and piano suite; 1972)
- Trio for Brass
- Variants (percussion; 1972)

=== Orchestra ===
- Clarinet Concerto
- Concert Piece (bassoon and string orchestra; 1952)
- Concertino (oboe and string orchestra; 1956)
- Galaxy (clarinet and orchestra)
- Poem (flute and string orchestra; 1947)
- Sinfonietta (1993)
- Symphony No. 1 (1967)
- Triptych (1961)

=== Organ ===
- Chorale Fantasy
- Interlacings
- Six Chorale Preludes
- Toccata

=== Piano ===
- American Fantasy (1976)
- Eight Sketches (1950)
- Six Preludes (1954)
- Sophisticated Daughter
- Teaching Pieces
- Transformations

=== Vocal ===
- Alleluia (mixed chorus a capella; 1951)
- Apostles' Creed (mixed chorus and optional organ; 1962)
- Arise, O God, to Judge the Earth (Psalm 82; (mixed chorus and optional organ; 1973)
- Blessed (mixed chorus, flute, trumpet and organ; 1976)
- Boating Song (words by Li Po; mixed chorus and piano; 1960)
- Chinese Cycle from the Book of Songs (women's chorus and orchestra; 1962)
- Create in Me a Clean Heart, O God (soloista, chorus, congregation and instruments; 1969)
- Delight in the Lord (Psalm 37; mixed chorus and optional organ; 1973)
- Doors of Heaven (words by Robert Nathan; mixed chorus a capella; 1957)
- Eve (words by Ralph Hodgson; women's chorus and piano; 1956)
- Great Stars of Our Time (voice and piano)
- Help, O Lord, All Godly Men (Psalm 12; mixed chorus and optional organ; 1973)
- Hymn (words by Stephen Crane; women's chorus and piano; 1953)
- If I Take the Wings of Morning (Psalm 139 mixed chorus and flute; 1971)
- It is Good (Psalm 92; women's chorus and organ or piano; 1973)
- (The) Lord Reigns Over Us (Psalm 93; women's chorus and organ; 1973)
- Lord, Your Blessing Please (Psalm 67; mixed chorus and organ; 1973)
- My Lord, Chastise Me Not in Anger (Psalm 6; mixed chorus and optional organ; 1973)
- My Prayers, Like Incense Rising (Psalm 141; mixed chorus and optional organ; 1973)
- O God, We Wait Upon You Now (Psalm 130; mixed chorus and optional organ; 1973)
- O How I Love Thy Word (Psalm 117; women's or mixed chorus and optional organ; 1973)
- Setting of Psalm 13 (mixed chorus and optional organ; 1955)
- Setting of Psalm 83 (mixed chorus a capella; 1961)
- Promised Gifts (Psalm 85; tenor, mixed chorus, congregation, trumpet and organ)
- Setting of Psalm 100 (mixed chorus and woodwind quintet; 1971)
- Praise the Lord (Psalm 146; mixed chorus and optional organ; 1973)
- Setting of Psalm 147 (mixed chorus and organ or piano)
- Praise the Lord of Creation (Psalm 148; mixed chorus and organ; 1973)
- Silent Night (by Joseph Mohr; arranged by Wendelburg for mixed chorus a capella; 1968)
- Song of the White Clouds (soprano, two flutes, and piano; 1969)
- Song on May Morning (words by John Milton; women's chorus a capella; 1956)
- Songs of William Blake (voice and piano; 1953)
- Stone Drums (1965)
- Three Miniatures (words by Rachel Field; women's chorus and piano; 1973)
- Three Songs (words by Betty Bird; 1971)
- Three Songs from Emily Dickinson
- Velvet Shoes (words by Elinor Wylie; women's chorus a capella; 1956)
- We Three Kings of Orient Are (by John Henry Hopkins Jr.; arranged by Wendelburg for mixed chorus and flute; 1972)
