= Johann Burchard Freystein =

German lawyer and hymnwriter (1671–1718)

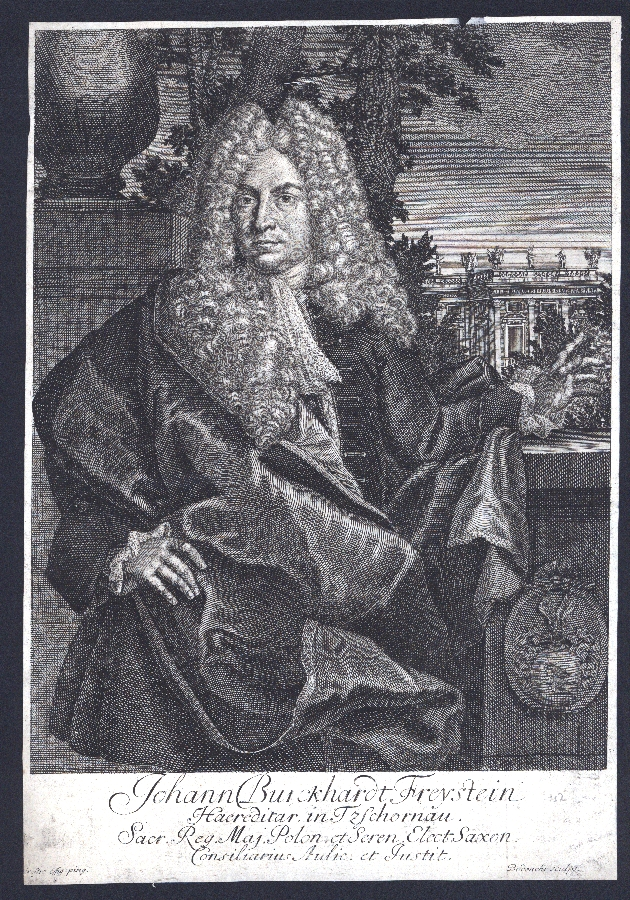
Engraving of Freystein by Moritz Bodenehr

Johann Burchard Freystein (18 April 1671 – 1 April 1718) was a German lawyer and hymnwriter.

== Biography ==
Freystein was born on 18 April 1671, in Weissenfels, to Samuel Adam Freystein, vice-chancellor of Duke August of Saxony, inspector of the Gymnasium of Weissenfels.

Johann Burchard Freyenstein studied at the University of Leipzig in law, mathematics, philosophy and architecture. He spent some time in Berlin and Halle. In 1695, he achieved his doctorate in law at the University of Jena. He then founded his own firm in Dresden. In 1703, he was counsellor in Gotha. In 1709, he returned as a counsellor of court and law in Dresden, where he died, on 1 April 1718.

Freystein's religiosity was influenced by Philipp Jakob Spener.

== Work ==
Freystein's hymn "Mache dich, mein Geist, bereit, wache, fleh und bete" can still be found in Protestant hymnals (ECG 261, Lutheran hymnal EC 387). Johann Sebastian Bach used it as the basis for his chorale cantata Mache dich, mein Geist, bereit, BWV 115.
