= Wer weiß, wie nahe mir mein Ende =

Lutheran hymn written in 1686

- Lutheran hymn
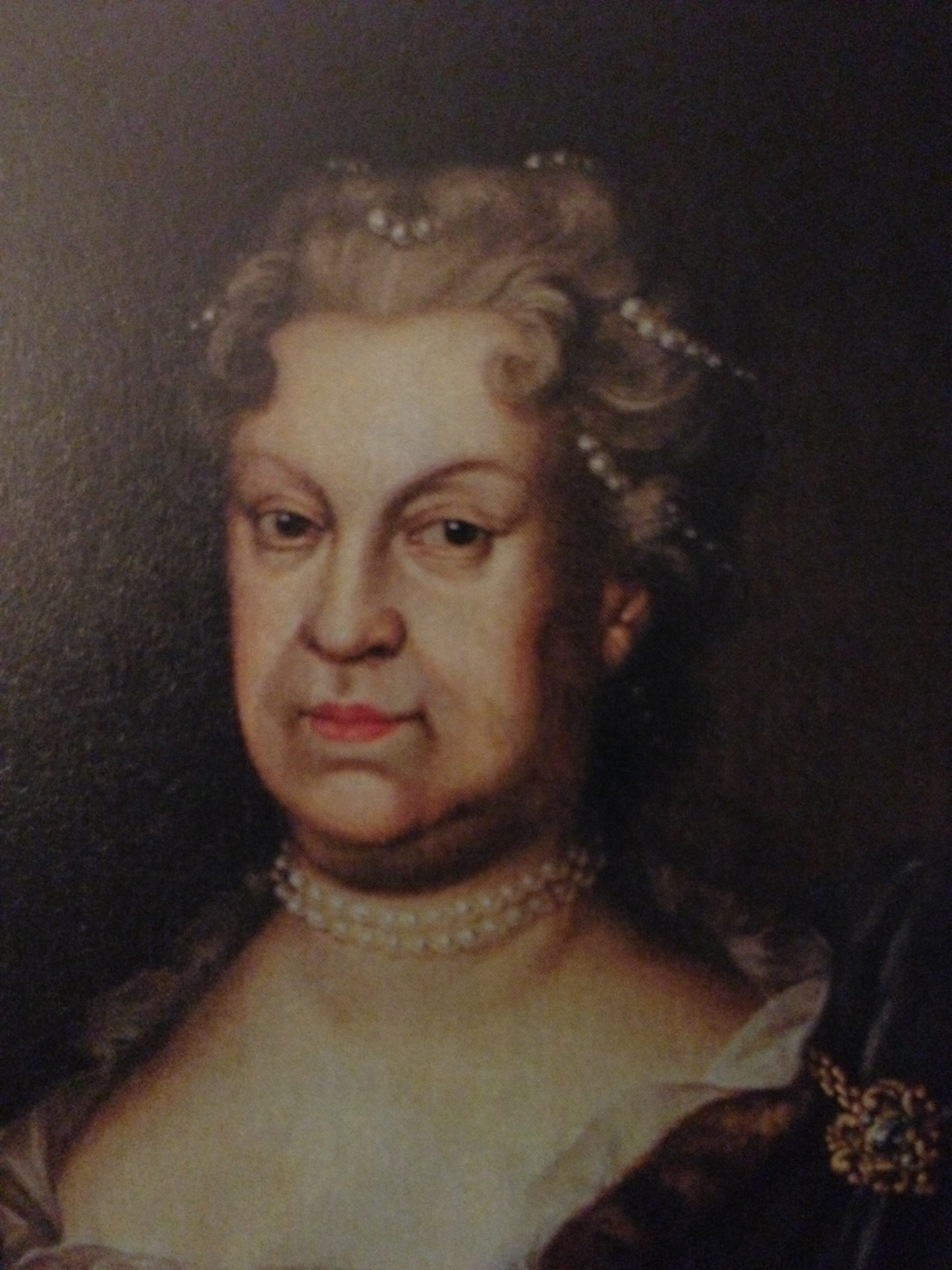
- Ämilie Juliane von Schwarzburg-Rudolstadt, the author of the lyrics
- Written: 1686
- Text: by Ämilie Juliane von Schwarzburg-Rudolstadt
- Language: German
- Melody: of "Wer nur den lieben Gott läßt walten" by Georg Neumark
- Composed: 1657

"Wer weiß, wie nahe mir mein Ende" ("Who knows how near to me is my end?") is a Lutheran hymn in German with lyrics by Ämilie Juliane von Schwarzburg-Rudolstadt, written in 1686. The hymn reflects the preparation for a good death. It is sung to the melody of "Wer nur den lieben Gott läßt walten", and is often used for funerals. It appears in the current German Protestant hymnal Evangelisches Gesangbuch (EG), but with a different melody.

== Lyrics ==
The Countess Ämilie Juliane von Schwarzburg-Rudolstadt, born to a noble family, received a good education in religion, Latin, history, among other sciences. She married, in 1665, to Count Albert Anton. Regarded as a forerunner of pietism, she wrote 587 extant songs, including Lutheran hymns such as "Wer weiß, wie nahe mir mein Ende".

The hymn's dated autograph is held by the Kirchenbibliothek zu Gera (Church library at Gera). The hymn was first published in 1686. It appears in the current German Protestant hymnal Evangelisches Gesangbuch (EG) as EG 530.

== Lyrics ==
The poem is in twelve stanzas of six lines each. Written in the first person, the singer departs from the knowledge that the time of death is uncertain, and a good death needs preparation at all times. The countess held daily meditations reflecting death, using her own and other hymns. The final two lines of eleven stanzas of her hymn are the same, like a refrain: "Mein Gott, ich bitt' durch Christi Blut: Mach's nur mit meinem Ende gut!" (My God, I pray through Christ’s blood, make sure my end is good!) In the final stanza, it is resolved for the answer after reflections: "Durch deine Gnad' und Christi Blut machst du's mit meinem Ende gut!" (Through your mercy and Christ's blood you will make sure that my end is good!).

== Music ==
"Wer weiß, wie nahe mir mein Ende" was traditionally sung to the 1657 melody of "Wer nur den lieben Gott läßt walten" by Georg Neumark. Johann Sebastian Bach used the hymn in three church cantatas. In Wer weiß, wie nahe mir mein Ende? BWV 27, composed in 1726 for the 16th Sunday after Trinity, he used the first stanza for the opening movement, interpolated with recitatives. Max Reger composed a chorale prelude as No. 48 of his 52 chorale preludes, Op. 67, and another as part of his chorale preludes, Op. 79b.

The hymn in the Protestant hymnal, EG 530, is printed with a different melody, but with the option to sing the lyrics with Neumark's familiar tune.
