= Wer weiß, wie nahe mir mein Ende? BWV 27 =

Church cantata by Johann Sebastian Bach

- Church cantata by J. S. Bach
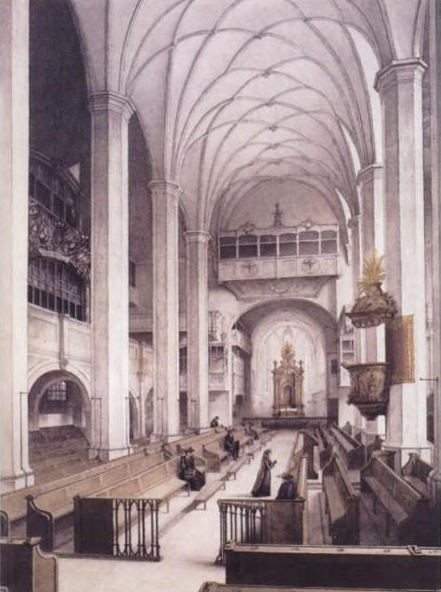
- Thomaskirche, Leipzig 1885
- Occasion: 16th Sunday after Trinity
- Performed: 6 October 1726: Leipzig
- Movements: 6
- Vocal: SATB choir and soloists
- Instrumental: horn; 3 oboes; oboe da caccia; organ; 2 violins; viola; continuo

Wer weiß, wie nahe mir mein Ende? (Who knows how near to me my end?), BWV 27, is a church cantata by Johann Sebastian Bach. He composed it in Leipzig for the 16th Sunday after Trinity and first performed it on 6 October 1726.

When Bach wrote the music, he was in his fourth year as Thomaskantor, the church music director of Leipzig. An unknown librettist included in the first movement the first stanza of the hymn "Wer weiß, wie nahe mir mein Ende" by Ämilie Juliane von Schwarzburg-Rudolstadt and closed the cantata with the first stanza of the hymn ""Welt ade! ich bin dein müde" by Johann Georg Albinus. The mood of the text changes with the third movement, from anxious pondering of death to a desire for death.

Bach composed the work in six movements and scored it for four vocal soloists, choir and a Baroque instrumental ensemble with horn, oboes, organ, strings and basso continuo. The first movements is unusual, as including a chorale but introducing each of its lines by a different soloist singing added text as an arioso.

== History and words ==
Bach composed the cantata in his fourth year in Leipzig for the 16th Sunday after Trinity. The prescribed readings for the day were from the Epistle to the Ephesians, a prayer of Paul for strengthening of faith (Ephesians 3:13–21), and from the Gospel of Luke (Luke 7:11–17), the raising of the youth at Nain.

An unknown poet included in the first movement the first stanza of the chorale "Wer weiß, wie nahe mir mein Ende" by Ämilie Juliane von Schwarzburg-Rudolstadt and closed the cantata with the first stanza of the hymn ""Welt ade! ich bin dein müde" by Johann Georg Albinus. Without an explanation, which may have been given in the sermon, the text changes mood with movement 3, from anxious pondering of death to a desire for death.

The chorale theme "Wer nur den lieben Gott läßt walten" (Zahn 2778) was first documented by Georg Neumark in Jena, but the melody can likely be traced back to Kiel, 1641. The five-part (SSATB) harmonisation of the concluding chorale "Welt, ade! ich bin dein müde" is not by Bach but by Johann Rosenmüller (published for the first time in Johann Qvirsfeld's Geistliche Harffen-Klang, Leipzig, 1679).

Bach first performed the cantata in a service on 6 October 1726. It was repeated without major changes in 1731. One further performance can not be dated.

== Scoring and structure ==
The cantata is scored for four soloists—soprano, alto, tenor and bass, a four-part choir with divided soprano in the closing chorale, horn, three oboes, oboe da caccia, organ, two violins, viola, and basso continuo. The duration is given as 19 minutes.

Movements of Wer weiß, wie nahe mir mein Ende?
| No. | Title | Type | Vocal | Winds | Strings | Others (Brass/Organ) | Key | Time |
|---|---|---|---|---|---|---|---|---|
| 1 | Wer weiß, wie nahe mir mein Ende? | Chorus | SATB | 2 oboes | 2 violins, 1 viola, basso continuo | Natural horn | C minor | 3/4 |
| 2 | Mein Leben hat kein ander Ziel | Recitative | Tenor | | Basso continuo | | | common time |
| 3 | Willkommen! will ich sagen | Aria | Alto | Oboe da caccia | Basso continuo | Pipe organ (obbligato) | Eb major | common time |
| 4 | Ach, wer doch schon im Himmel wär | Recitative | Soprano | | 2 violins, viola, basso continuo | | | common time |
| 5 | Gute Nacht, du Weltgetümmel | Aria | Bass | | 2 violins, viola, basso continuo | | G minor | 3/4 |
| 6 | Welt, ade! ich bin dein müde | Chorale | SSATB | 2 oboes (col 1 Soprano) | Violin (col 2 Soprano), violin (coll'Alto), viola (con Tenore), basso continuo | Natural horn (col 1 Soprano) | Bb major | common time |

== Music ==
The first movement is reminiscent of those opening Bach's chorale cantatas, quoting after an opening ritornello a chorale in long notes as a cantus firmus. Unusually, each of the three lines is preceded by a trope of recitative on added text, sung by different soloists as an arioso. Julian Mincham wrote that it is "about as tragic as it gets": it is in a minor key and quickly sounds a strong dissonance between the oboe phrase and the continuo. Descending arpeggiated strings underline the "wails of the damned" represented by the oboes.

A tenor recitative leads into a "shadowy" alto aria which echoes the first movement of Antonio Vivaldi's 'Spring' concert (published the year before, 1725), accompanied by an oboe da caccia. Chromaticism contributes to the "fleeting shadows" of the welcoming of death. The accompanying keyboard part has historically been played by either harpsichord or organ. The obbligato oboe conveys a number of different ideas: dancing, sighing, and "quasi-tragic" descent.

The soprano recitative uses word painting and sustained chordal harmonies to urge the listener into heaven. The bass aria then combines two contrasting sentiments: adieu and agitation. The repeated pairing of the "farewell theme – tumult theme" holds through both the opening ritornello and the vocal line, breaking only with the closing on the farewell theme alone.

The closing chorale includes two soprano parts and is stylistically reminiscent of an English madrigal.

== Recordings ==
- J. S. Bach: Kantaten 18 · 152, Jürgen Jürgens, Monteverdi-Chor, Leonhardt-Consort. Telefunken 1966.
- Bach Kantaten, Vol. 1: BWV 190a, BWV 84, BWV 89, BWV 27, Diethard Hellmann, Bachchor Mainz, Bachorchester Mainz. DdM-Records Mitterteich late 1960s?
- Bach Cantatas Vol. 4 – Sundays after Trinity I, Karl Richter, Münchener Bach-Chor, Münchener Bach-Orchester. Archiv Produktion 1977.
- Die Bach Kantate Vol. 51, Helmuth Rilling, Gächinger Kantorei, Bach-Collegium Stuttgart. Hänssler 1982.
- Bach Edition Vol. 11 – Cantatas Vol. 5, Pieter Jan Leusink, Holland Boys Choir, Netherlands Bach Collegium. Brilliant Classics 1999.
- Bach Cantatas Vol. 8: Bremen/Santiago, John Eliot Gardiner, Monteverdi Choir, English Baroque Soloists. Soli Deo Gloria 2000.
- J. S. Bach: Complete Cantatas Vol. 16, Ton Koopman, Amsterdam Baroque Orchestra & Choir. Antoine Marchand 2000.
- J. S. Bach: Christus, der ist mein Leben – Cantates BWV 27, 84, 95 & 161, Philippe Herreweghe, Collegium Vocale Gent. Harmonia Mundi France 2007.
