= Psalm 38 =

Biblical psalm

- A psalm of David to bring to remembrance "O Lord, rebuke me not in thy wrath"
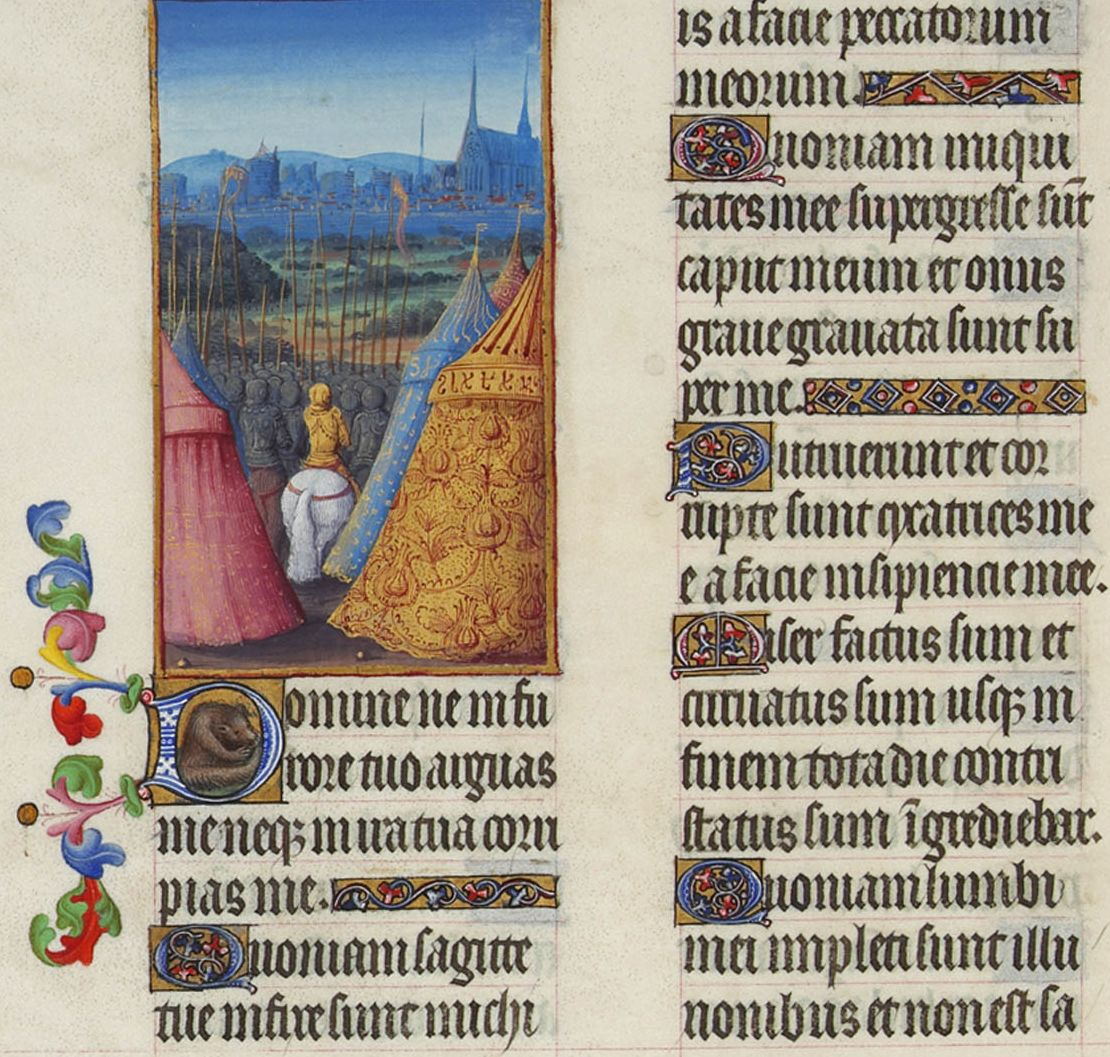
- Psalm 38 (Vulgate: 37) from the Très Riches Heures du Duc de Berry manuscript
- Other name: Psalm 37; Domine, ne in furore tuo arguas me
- Text: by David
- Language: Hebrew (original)

Psalm 38
- ← Psalm 37 Psalm 39 →
- Book: Book of Psalms
- Hebrew Bible part: Ketuvim
- Order in the Hebrew part: 1
- Category: Sifrei Emet
- Christian Bible part: Old Testament
- Order in the Christian part: 19

Psalm 38 is the 38th psalm of the Book of Psalms, entitled "A psalm of David to bring to remembrance", is one of the 7 Penitential Psalms. In the slightly different numbering system used in the Greek Septuagint version of the Bible, and in the Latin Vulgate, this psalm is Psalm 37.

In the English King James Version of the Bible, it begins: "O Lord, rebuke me not in thy wrath". In Latin, it is known as "Domine, ne in furore tuo arguas me".

The title "to bring to remembrance" also applies to Psalm 70.

== Content ==
The psalm's topic is God's displeasure at sin (verses 1–11), and the psalmist's sufferings and prayers (verses 12–22). The psalm opens with a prayer, David felt as if he had been forgotten of his God. It then passes intermittently between complaint and hope. Benjamin Weiss noted the "depth of misery into which the psalmist gradually plunges in his complaints, then the sudden grasp at the arm of mercy and omnipotence".

Possibly written late in David's life, although Coffman's believes it was early in David's reign, it was often conjectured as a biography of sorts for David. John Calvin thought rather it was David's intent to commit to music to transmit what he had learnt through his life of the relationship he had with his Lord, before he died.

== Uses ==
=== New Testament ===
Verse 11 is quoted in Luke 23:49.

=== Judaism ===
Verse 22 is part of the long Tachanun recited on Mondays and Thursdays.

=== Catholic Church ===
Psalm motet Domine ne in furore, a setting of Psalm 37 (Vulgate numbering, a.k.a. Psalm 38 in Hebrew numbering) by Josquin des Prez.

From around AD 530, this Psalm was traditionally sung in monasteries during matins on Mondays, according to the Rule of St. Benedict. Since reform of the Office of Readings after Vatican II, Psalm 37 is now recited during the liturgy of the hours on Friday in the second week of the four-weekly cycle of liturgical prayers.

=== Book of Common Prayer ===
In the Church of England's Book of Common Prayer, this psalm is appointed to be read on the morning of the eighth day of the month, as well as at Mattins on Ash Wednesday.

=== Ethiopian Orthodox Tewahedo Church ===
Verse 1 (which is almost identical to verse 1 of Psalm 6) is quoted in chapter 6 of 1 Meqabyan, a book considered canonical by this church.

== Musical settings ==
Musical settings of Psalm 38 include:

- Domine ne in furore (psalm 37 according to the Vulgate numbering) was set by Josquin des Prez.
- "Herr, straf mich nicht in deinem Zorn / Lass mich dein Grimm verzehren nicht" (not to be confused with "Herr, straf mich nicht in deinem Zorn / Das bitt ich dich von Herzen", a paraphrase of Psalm 6), Psalm 38 in the Becker Psalter, was set by Heinrich Schütz (SWV 135, Zahn No. 5859).
- Johann Sebastian Bach set Psalm 38:4 in the opening chorus of his church cantata Es ist nichts Gesundes an meinem Leibe, BWV 25.
- Igor Stravinsky set Psalm 38:13-14 in the first movement of his Symphony of Psalms.

== Text ==
The following table shows the Hebrew text of the Psalm with vowels, alongside the Koine Greek text in the Septuagint and the English translation from the King James Version. Note that the meaning can slightly differ between these versions, as the Septuagint and the Masoretic Text come from different textual traditions. (Note: A 1917 translation directly from Hebrew to English by the Jewish Publication Society can be found here or here, and an 1844 translation directly from the Septuagint by L. C. L. Brenton can be found here. Both translations are in the public domain.) In the Septuagint, this psalm is numbered Psalm 37.

#	Hebrew	English	Greek
(Note: In the Jewish verse numbering, the ascription of this psalm is verse 1, and the rest of the psalm begins from verse 2. However, the Christian verse numbering does not count the ascription as a separate verse.)	מִזְמ֖וֹר לְדָוִ֣ד לְהַזְכִּֽיר׃	(A Psalm of David, to bring to remembrance.)	Ψαλμὸς τῷ Δαυΐδ· εἰς ἀνάμνησιν περὶ τοῦ σαββάτου. -
1	יְֽהֹוָ֗ה אַל־בְּקֶצְפְּךָ֥ תוֹכִיחֵ֑נִי וּֽבַחֲמָתְךָ֥ תְיַסְּרֵֽנִי׃	O Lord, rebuke me not in thy wrath: neither chasten me in thy hot displeasure.	ΚΥΡΙΕ, μὴ τῷ θυμῷ σου ἐλέγξῃς με, μηδὲ τῇ ὀργῇ σου παιδεύσῃς με.
2	כִּֽי־חִ֭צֶּיךָ נִ֣חֲתוּ בִ֑י וַתִּנְחַ֖ת עָלַ֣י יָדֶֽךָ׃	For thine arrows stick fast in me, and thy hand presseth me sore.	ὅτι τὰ βέλη σου ἐνεπάγησάν μοι, καὶ ἐπεστήριξας ἐπ᾿ ἐμὲ τὴν χεῖρά σου·
3	אֵין־מְתֹ֣ם בִּ֭בְשָׂרִי מִפְּנֵ֣י זַעְמֶ֑ךָ אֵין־שָׁל֥וֹם בַּ֝עֲצָמַ֗י מִפְּנֵ֥י חַטָּאתִֽי׃	There is no soundness in my flesh because of thine anger; neither is there any rest in my bones because of my sin.	οὐκ ἔστιν ἴασις ἐν τῇ σαρκί μου ἀπὸ προσώπου τῆς ὀργῆς σου, οὐκ ἔστιν εἰρήνη ἐν τοῖς ὀστέοις μου ἀπὸ προσώπου τῶν ἁμαρτιῶν μου.
4	כִּ֣י עֲ֭וֺנֹתַי עָֽבְר֣וּ רֹאשִׁ֑י כְּמַשָּׂ֥א כָ֝בֵ֗ד יִכְבְּד֥וּ מִמֶּֽנִּי׃	For mine iniquities are gone over mine head: as a heavy burden they are too heavy for me.	ὅτι αἱ ἀνομίαι μου ὑπερῇραν τὴν κεφαλήν μου, ὡσεὶ φορτίον βαρὺ ἐβαρύνθησαν ἐπ᾿ ἐμέ.
5	הִבְאִ֣ישׁוּ נָ֭מַקּוּ חַבּוּרֹתָ֑י מִ֝פְּנֵ֗י אִוַּלְתִּֽי׃	My wounds stink and are corrupt because of my foolishness.	προσώζεσαν καὶ ἐσάπησαν οἱ μώλωπές μου ἀπὸ προσώπου τῆς ἀφροσύνης μου·
6	נַעֲוֵ֣יתִי שַׁחֹ֣תִי עַד־מְאֹ֑ד כׇּל־הַ֝יּ֗וֹם קֹדֵ֥ר הִלָּֽכְתִּי׃	I am troubled; I am bowed down greatly; I go mourning all the day long.	ἐταλαιπώρησα καὶ κατεκάμφθην ἕως τέλους, ὅλην τὴν ἡμέραν σκυθρωπάζων ἐπορευόμην.
7	כִּֽי־כְ֭סָלַי מָלְא֣וּ נִקְלֶ֑ה וְאֵ֥ין מְ֝תֹ֗ם בִּבְשָׂרִֽי׃	For my loins are filled with a loathsome disease: and there is no soundness in my flesh.	ὅτι αἱ ψόαι μου ἐπλήσθησαν ἐμπαιγμάτων, καὶ οὐκ ἔστιν ἴασις ἐν τῇ σαρκί μου·
8	נְפוּג֣וֹתִי וְנִדְכֵּ֣יתִי עַד־מְאֹ֑ד שָׁ֝אַ֗גְתִּי מִֽנַּהֲמַ֥ת לִבִּֽי׃	I am feeble and sore broken: I have roared by reason of the disquietness of my heart.	ἐκακώθην καὶ ἐταπεινώθην ἕως σφόδρα, ὠρυόμην ἀπὸ στεναγμοῦ τῆς καρδίας μου.
9	אֲֽדֹנָ֗י נֶגְדְּךָ֥ כׇל־תַּאֲוָתִ֑י וְ֝אַנְחָתִ֗י מִמְּךָ֥ לֹֽא־נִסְתָּֽרָה׃	Lord, all my desire is before thee; and my groaning is not hid from thee.	Κύριε, ἐναντίον σου πᾶσα ἡ ἐπιθυμία μου, καὶ ὁ στεναγμός μου ἀπὸ σοῦ οὐκ ἀπεκρύβη.
10	לִבִּ֣י סְ֭חַרְחַר עֲזָבַ֣נִי כֹחִ֑י וְֽאוֹר־עֵינַ֥י גַּם־הֵ֝֗ם אֵ֣ין אִתִּֽי׃	My heart panteth, my strength faileth me: as for the light of mine eyes, it also is gone from me.	ἡ καρδία μου ἐταράχθη, ἐγκατέλιπέ με ἡ ἰσχύς μου, καὶ τὸ φῶς τῶν ὀφθαλμῶν μου, καὶ αὐτὸ οὐκ ἔστι μετ᾿ ἐμοῦ.
11	אֹֽהֲבַ֨י ׀ וְרֵעַ֗י מִנֶּ֣גֶד נִגְעִ֣י יַעֲמֹ֑דוּ וּ֝קְרוֹבַ֗י מֵרָחֹ֥ק עָמָֽדוּ׃	My lovers and my friends stand aloof from my sore; and my kinsmen stand afar off.	οἱ φίλοι μου καὶ οἱ πλησίον μου ἐξ ἐναντίας μου ἤγγισαν καὶ ἔστησαν, καὶ οἱ ἔγγιστά μου ἀπὸ μακρόθεν ἔστησαν·
12	וַיְנַקְשׁ֤וּ ׀ מְבַקְשֵׁ֬י נַפְשִׁ֗י וְדֹרְשֵׁ֣י רָ֭עָתִי דִּבְּר֣וּ הַוּ֑וֹת וּ֝מִרְמ֗וֹת כׇּל־הַיּ֥וֹם יֶהְגּֽוּ׃	They also that seek after my life lay snares for me: and they that seek my hurt speak mischievous things, and imagine deceits all the day long.	καὶ ἐξεβιάζοντο οἱ ζητοῦντες τὴν ψυχήν μου, καὶ οἱ ζητοῦντες τὰ κακά μοι ἐλάλησαν ματαιότητας, καὶ δολιότητας ὅλην τὴν ἡμέραν ἐμελέτησαν.
13	וַאֲנִ֣י כְ֭חֵרֵשׁ לֹ֣א אֶשְׁמָ֑ע וּ֝כְאִלֵּ֗ם לֹ֣א יִפְתַּח־פִּֽיו׃	But I, as a deaf man, heard not; and I was as a dumb man that openeth not his mouth.	ἐγὼ δὲ ὡσεὶ κωφὸς οὐκ ἤκουον καὶ ὡσεὶ ἄλαλος οὐκ ἀνοίγων τὸ στόμα αὐτοῦ·
14	וָאֱהִ֗י כְּ֭אִישׁ אֲשֶׁ֣ר לֹֽא־שֹׁמֵ֑עַ וְאֵ֥ין בְּ֝פִ֗יו תּוֹכָחֽוֹת׃	Thus I was as a man that heareth not, and in whose mouth are no reproofs.	καὶ ἐγενόμην ὡσεὶ ἄνθρωπος οὐκ ἀκούων καὶ οὐκ ἔχων ἐν τῷ στόματι αὐτοῦ ἐλεγμούς.
15	כִּֽי־לְךָ֣ יְהֹוָ֣ה הוֹחָ֑לְתִּי אַתָּ֥ה תַ֝עֲנֶ֗ה אֲדֹנָ֥י אֱלֹהָֽי׃	For in thee, O LORD, do I hope: thou wilt hear, O Lord my God.	ὅτι ἐπὶ σοί, Κύριε, ἤλπισα· σὺ εἰκακούσῃ, Κύριε ὁ Θεός μου.
16	כִּֽי־אָ֭מַרְתִּי פֶּן־יִשְׂמְחוּ־לִ֑י בְּמ֥וֹט רַ֝גְלִ֗י עָלַ֥י הִגְדִּֽילוּ׃	For I said, Hear me, lest otherwise they should rejoice over me: when my foot slippeth, they magnify themselves against me.	ὅτι εἶπα· μήποτε ἐπιχαρῶσί μοι οἱ ἐχθροί μου· καὶ ἐν τῷ σαλευθῆναι πόδας μου ἐπ᾿ ἐμὲ ἐμεγαλοῤῥημόνησαν.
17	כִּֽי־אֲ֭נִי לְצֶ֣לַע נָכ֑וֹן וּמַכְאוֹבִ֖י נֶגְדִּ֣י תָמִֽיד׃	For I am ready to halt, and my sorrow is continually before me.	ὅτι ἐγὼ εἰς μάστιγας ἕτοιμος, καὶ ἡ ἀλγηδών μου ἐνώπιόν μού ἐστι διαπαντός.
18	כִּֽי־עֲוֺנִ֥י אַגִּ֑יד אֶ֝דְאַ֗ג מֵ֖חַטָּאתִֽי׃	For I will declare mine iniquity; I will be sorry for my sin.	ὅτι τὴν ἀνομίαν μου ἐγὼ ἀναγγελῶ καὶ μεριμνήσω ὑπὲρ τῆς ἁμαρτίας μου.
19	וְֽ֭אֹיְבַי חַיִּ֣ים עָצֵ֑מוּ וְרַבּ֖וּ שֹׂנְאַ֣י שָֽׁקֶר׃	But mine enemies are lively, and they are strong: and they that hate me wrongfully are multiplied.	οἱ δὲ ἐχθροί μου ζῶσι καὶ κεκραταίωνται ὑπὲρ ἐμέ, καὶ ἐπληθύνθησαν οἱ μισοῦντές με ἀδίκως·
20	וּמְשַׁלְּמֵ֣י רָ֭עָה תַּ֣חַת טוֹבָ֑ה יִ֝שְׂטְנ֗וּנִי תַּ֣חַת (רדופי) [רׇֽדְפִי־]טֽוֹב׃	They also that render evil for good are mine adversaries; because I follow the thing that good is.	οἱ ἀνταποδιδόντες μοι κακὰ ἀντὶ ἀγαθῶν ἐνδιέβαλλόν με, ἐπεὶ κατεδίωκον ἀγαθωσύνην.
21	אַל־תַּעַזְבֵ֥נִי יְהֹוָ֑ה אֱ֝לֹהַ֗י אַל־תִּרְחַ֥ק מִמֶּֽנִּי׃	Forsake me not, O LORD: O my God, be not far from me.	μὴ ἐγκαταλίπῃς με, Κύριε· ὁ Θεός μου, μὴ ἀποστῇς ἀπ᾿ ἐμοῦ·
22	ח֥וּשָׁה לְעֶזְרָתִ֑י אֲ֝דֹנָ֗י תְּשׁוּעָתִֽי׃	Make haste to help me, O Lord my salvation.	πρόσχες εἰς τὴν βοήθειάν μου, Κύριε τῆς σωτηρίας μου.
