= Johann Georg Albinus =

German pastor and hymnwriter (1624–1679)

- Born: March 6, 1624
- Died: May 25, 1679
- Occupations: Pastor; hymnwriter

Johann Georg Albinus (6 March 1624 – 25 May 1679) was a German Protestant pastor and hymnwriter. He studied at the University of Leipzig and served as a rector at the Naumburg Cathedral School and the pastor of St. Othmar's Church, both in Naumburg. His hymns have been set by various composers, for instance by Johann Rosenmüller who set his hymn "Welt, ade! Ich bin dein müde" for SSATB voices (published 1652), a setting which was adopted by Johann Sebastian Bach as last movement of his cantata Wer weiß, wie nahe mir mein Ende? BWV 27 (1726). Also Bach's cantata Der Friede sei mit dir, BWV 158 contains a stanza of this hymn, set to Rosenmüller's hymn tune (Zahn No. 6531).
