= List of Passion hymns =

Passion hymns are hymns dedicated to the Passion of Jesus. They are often sung during Passiontide, namely for Maundy Thursday and Good Friday. Many of them were used as chorales in Passions, such as Bach's St John and St Matthew Passion.

== List of Passion hymns ==
Hymn	Translation	Text	Tune	Language	Published	Notes
"Christe, du Lamm Gottes"						
"Christus, der uns selig macht"	Christ who makes us blessed	Michael Weiße	Bohemian Brethren	German	1531	
"Da der Herr Christ zu Tische saß"	When the Lord Christ sat at the table	Nikolaus Herman	in Görlitz	German	1560	
"Da Jesus an dem Kreuze stund"	When Jesus stood by the Cross	Johann Böschenstein	Genevan Psalter	German	1537	Sayings of Jesus on the cross
"Gloria, laus et honor"	"All Glory, Laud and Honour"					
"Der am Kreuz ist meine Liebe"	He on the Cross is my love	Johann Mentzer or Ahasverus Fritsch	"Werde munter, mein Gemüte"	German		
"Der am Kreuz ist meine Liebe"	He on the Cross is my love	J. E. Greding	"Freue dich, du meine Seele"	German	1740	
"Der am Kreuz ist meine Liebe"	He on the Cross is my love	Friedrich Gottlieb Klopstock	"Freue dich, du meine Seele"	German	1758	
"Der am Kreuz ist meine Liebe"	He on the Cross is my love	Lothar Zenetti		German	1974	
"Herzliebster Jesu"	Oh Dearest Jesus	Johann Heermann	Johann Crüger	German	1630	
"O Haupt voll Blut und Wunden"	O Sacred Head, Now Wounded	Paul Gerhardt	Hans Leo Hassler	German	1656	
"Jesu Leiden, Pein und Tod"	Suffering, pain and death of Jesus	Paul Stockmann	Melchior Vulpius	German	1633	
"Jesu, meines Glaubens Zier"		Gottfried Wilhelm Sacer	Zahn 6453 (1714); Harmonisation: BWV 472 (1736)	German	1661	
"It is finished! Christ hath known"		Gabriel Gillett	Zahn 6453 (1714); Harmonisation: BWV 472 (1736)	English	1906	The English Hymnal No. 118 (p. 162)
"O Lamm Gottes, unschuldig"	O Lamb of God, innocent	Nikolaus Decius	Nikolaus Decius	German	1531	based on Agnus Dei
"Ein Lämmlein geht und trägt die Schuld"	A Lambkin goes and bears the guilt	Paul Gerhardt	"An Wasserflüssen Babylon"	German	1647	
"Lift High the Cross"		George Kitchin	"Crucifer"	English	1887	
"O Mensch, bewein dein Sünde groß"	O man, bewail thy sins so great	Sebald Heyden		German	1530	
"Ride On, Ride On in Majesty!"						
"O Welt, sieh hier dein Leben"	O world, see here your life	Nikolaus Decius	"Innsbruck, ich muss dich lassen"	German	1647	
"When I Survey the Wondrous Cross"		Isaac Watts	"Rockingham"	English	1707	
