= St Matthew Passion =

1727 sacred oratorio by Johann Sebastian Bach

- BWV 244
- Passion by J. S. Bach
- Title page of Bach's autograph score
- Native name: Passio Domini Nostri J.C. Secundum Evangelistam Matthaeum
- Related: BWV 244a
- Occasion: Good Friday
- Text: Matthew 26–27; Picander; chorales
- Language: German
- Performed: 11 April 1727: St. Thomas Church, Leipzig
- Scoring: Two choirs SATB; Evangelist; Vox Christi; Solo: soprano, alto, tenor, bass, soliloquents; Two orchestras of woodwinds, strings and basso continuo

The St Matthew Passion (German: Matthäuspassion), BWV 244, is a Passion, a sacred oratorio written by Johann Sebastian Bach in 1727 for solo voices, double choir and double orchestra, with libretto in German by Picander. It sets the 26th and 27th chapters of the Gospel of Matthew (in the Luther Bible) to music, with interspersed chorales and arias. It is widely regarded as one of the masterpieces of Baroque sacred music. The original Latin title Passio Domini nostri J.C. secundum Evangelistam Matthæum translates to "The Passion of our Lord Jesus Christ according to the Evangelist Matthew".

== History ==
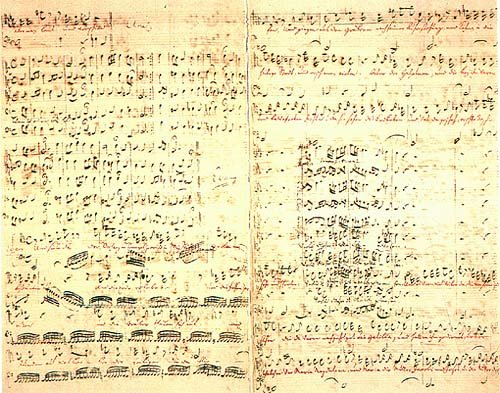
Fair copy in Bach's own hand of the revised version of the St Matthew Passion BWV 244 that is generally dated to the year 1743–46

The St Matthew Passion is the second of two Passion settings by Bach that have survived in their entirety, the first being the St John Passion, first performed in 1724.

=== Versions and contemporaneous performances ===
Little is known with certainty about the creation process of the St Matthew Passion. The available information derives from extant early manuscripts, contemporary publications of the libretto, and circumstantial data, for instance in documents archived by the Town Council of Leipzig.

The St Matthew Passion was probably first performed on 11 April (Good Friday) 1727 in the St. Thomas Church, and again on 15 April 1729, 30 March 1736, and 23 March 1742. Bach then revised it again between 1743 and 1746.

==== First version (BWV 244.1, previously 244b) ====
In Leipzig it was not allowed to paraphrase the words of the Gospel in a Passion presentation on Good Friday. A setting of the then-popular Brockes Passion libretto, largely consisting of such paraphrasing, could not be done without replacing the paraphrases by actual Gospel text. That was the option chosen by Bach for his 1724 St John Passion. In 1725 Christian Friedrich Henrici, a Leipzig poet who used Picander as his pen name, had published Erbauliche Gedanken auf den Grünen Donnerstag und Charfreytag ("Edifying Thoughts on Maundy Thursday and Good Friday"), containing free verse suitable for a Passion presentation in addition to the Gospel text. Bach seems to have stimulated the poet to write more of such verse in order to come to a full-fledged libretto for a Passion presentation combined with the Passion text chapters 26 and 27 in the Gospel of St Matthew.

Since 1975, it has usually been assumed that Bach's St Matthew Passion was first performed on Good Friday 11 April 1727, although its first performance may have been as late as Good Friday 1729, as older sources assert. The performance took place in the St. Thomas Church (Thomaskirche) in Leipzig. Bach had been Thomaskantor (i.e., Cantor, and responsible for the music in the church) since 1723. In this version the Passion was written for two choruses and orchestras. Choir I consists of a soprano in ripieno voice, a soprano solo, an alto solo, a tenor solo, SATB chorus, two traversos, two oboes, two oboes d'amore, two oboes da caccia, lute, strings (two violin sections, violas and cellos), and continuo (at least organ). Choir II consists of SATB voices, violin I, violin II, viola, viola da gamba, cello, two traversos, two oboes (d'amore) and possibly continuo.

==== Funeral cantata for Köthen (BWV 1143, previously 244a) ====
Klagt, Kinder, klagt es aller Welt, BWV 244a, a cantata of which only the text is extant, was performed 24 March 1729 in Köthen at a memorial service held some months after the death of Leopold, Prince of Anhalt-Köthen. The music of the cantata consisted largely of music adapted from the St Matthew Passion.

==== Passion performances in the St. Thomas Church ====
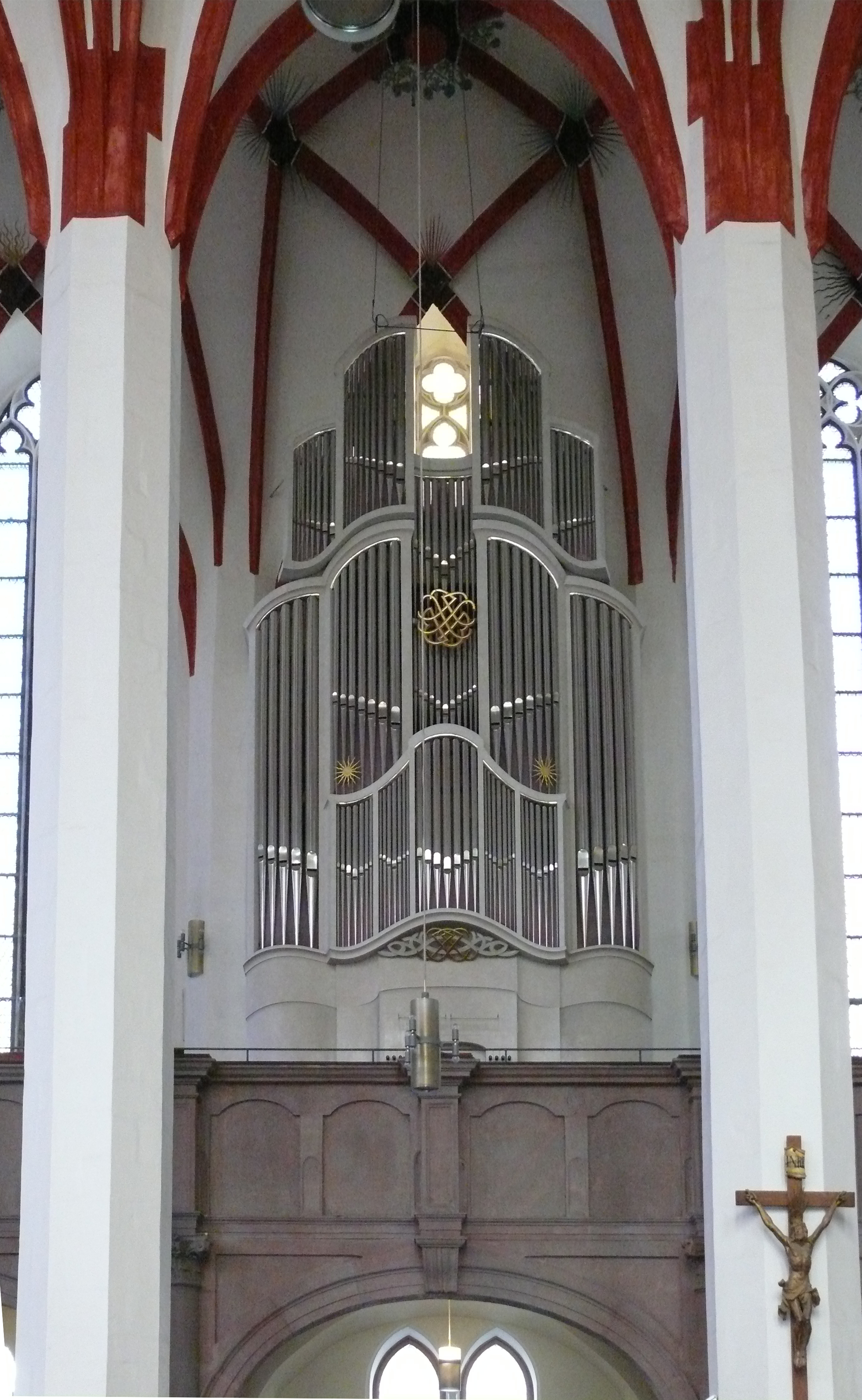
"Small" organ loft in the St. Thomas Church, that would have fitted Chorus II and Orchestra II of the St Matthew Passion in Bach's time (note: the organ in this photograph is a late 20th-century addition)

At the time only men sang in church: high pitch vocal parts were usually performed by treble choristers. In 1730, Bach informed the Leipzig Town Council as to what he saw as the number of singers that should be available for the churches under his responsibility, including those for the St. Thomas Church: a choir of twelve singers, plus eight singers that would serve both St. Thomas and the Peterskirche. The request was only partially granted by the Town Council, so possibly at least some of the Passion presentations in St. Thomas were with fewer than twenty singers, even for the large scale works, like the St Matthew Passion, that were written for double choir.

In Bach's time, St. Thomas Church had two organ lofts: the large organ loft that was used throughout the year for musicians performing in Sunday services, vespers, etc., and the small organ loft, situated at the opposite side of the former, that was used additionally in the grand services for Christmas and Easter. The St Matthew Passion was composed as to perform a single work from both organ lofts at the same time: Chorus and orchestra I would occupy the large organ loft, and Chorus and orchestra II performed from the small organ loft. The size of the organ lofts limited the number of performers for each Choir. Large choruses, in addition to the instrumentists indicated for Choir I and II, would have been impossible, so also here there is an indication that each part (including those of strings and singers) would have a limited number of performers, where, for the choruses, the numbers indicated by Bach in his 1730 request would appear to be (more than?) a maximum of what could be fitted in the organ lofts.

==== Later revisions and performances (BWV 244.2, previously 244) ====
Bach revised the Passion by 1736, for a performance on Good Friday 30 March 1736. This is the version (with some possible later adjustments) that is generally known as the St Matthew Passion, BWV 244. In this version both choirs have SATB soloists and chorus, and a string section and continuo consisting of at least violins I and II, viola, gamba and organ. The woodwinds are two traversos, oboes and oboes d'amore for each choir, and in addition for choir I two oboes da caccia.

Some parts were adjusted for a new performance on Good Friday 23 March 1742. Bach finalized his autograph score in 1743–1746; however, this undertaking was not tied to any new performance.

=== Numbering of the movements ===
Bach did not number the sections of the St Matthew Passion, all of them vocal movements, but twentieth-century scholars have done so. The two main schemes in use today are the scheme from the Neue Bach-Ausgabe (NBA, New Bach Edition) which uses a 1 through 68 numbering system, and the older Bach-Werke-Verzeichnis (BWV, Bach Works Catalog) scheme which divides the work into 78 numbers. Both use lettered subsections in some cases. This article is written using the NBA numbering system.

=== Text ===
Bach worked together with his librettist, Christian Friedrich Henrici, known as Picander, who published the text of the libretto of the St Matthew Passion in 1729.

==== Bible text ====
The Bible text used for Part One is Matthew 26:1–56. Part Two uses Matthew 26:57–75 and Matthew 27:1–66.

Additionally, Song of Songs 6:1 is used in the opening aria (with chorus) of Part Two (No. 30).

==== Free verse ====
Picander wrote text for recitatives and arias, and for the large scale choral movements that open and close the Passion. Other libretto sections came from publications by Salomo Franck and Barthold Heinrich Brockes.

==== Chorales ====
The chorale melodies and their texts would have been known to those attending the services in the St Thomas church. The oldest chorale Bach used in the St Matthew Passion dates from 1525. Three chorales are written by Paul Gerhardt and Bach included five stanzas from his O Haupt voll Blut und Wunden. Bach used the hymns in different ways, most are four-part setting, two as the cantus firmus of the two chorale fantasias framing Part I, one as a commenting element in a tenor recitative.

Chorales in St Matthew Passion
Author	Date	Hymn; Stanza		Stanza incipit	No.	Set as...
Nikolaus Decius	1541	O Lamm Gottes, unschuldig	1	O Lamm Gottes, unschuldig	1	cantus firmus (Note: Without text (played by organ only) in older versions of the Passion) in choral movement
Johann Heermann	1630	Herzliebster Jesu	1	Herzliebster Jesu, was hast du verbrochen	3	four-part chorale
Paul Gerhardt	1647	O Welt, sieh hier dein Leben	5	Ich bin's, ich sollte büßen	10	four-part chorale
Paul Gerhardt	1656	O Haupt voll Blut und Wunden	5	Erkenne mich, mein Hüter	15	four-part chorale
Paul Gerhardt	1656	O Haupt voll Blut und Wunden	7	Es dient zu meinen Freuden	17 (Note: Only in version BWV 244b)	four-part chorale
Paul Gerhardt	1656	O Haupt voll Blut und Wunden	6	Ich will hier bei dir stehen	17 (Note: Not in version BWV 244b)	four-part chorale
Johann Heermann	1630	Herzliebster Jesu	3	Was ist doch wohl die Ursach	19	coro II in tenor recitative
Albert, Duke of Prussia	1547	Was mein Gott will, das g'scheh allzeit	1	Was mein Gott will, das g'scheh allzeit	25	four-part chorale
Christian Keymann	1658	Meinen Jesum laß ich nicht	6	Jesum laß' ich nicht von mir	29	four-part chorale
Sebald Heyden	1525	O Mensch, bewein dein Sünde groß	1	O Mensch, bewein dein Sünde groß	29	cantus firmus in choral movement
Adam Reusner	1533	In dich hab ich gehoffet, Herr	5	Mir hat die Welt trüglich gericht'	32	four-part chorale
Paul Gerhardt	1647	O Welt, sieh hier dein Leben	3	Wer hat dich so geschlagen	37	four-part chorale
Johann Rist	1642	Werde munter, mein Gemüte	6	Bin ich gleich von dir gewichen	40	four-part chorale
Paul Gerhardt	1656	Befiehl du deine Wege	1	Befiehl du deine Wege	44	four-part chorale
Johann Heermann	1630	Herzliebster Jesu	4	Wie wunderbarlich ist doch diese Strafe!	46	four-part chorale
Paul Gerhardt	1656	O Haupt voll Blut und Wunden	1	O Haupt voll Blut und Wunden	54	four-part chorale
Paul Gerhardt	1656	O Haupt voll Blut und Wunden	2	Du edles Angesichte	54, cont.	four-part chorale
Paul Gerhardt	1656	O Haupt voll Blut und Wunden	9	Wenn ich einmal soll scheiden	62	four-part chorale
Notes

In the early version BWV 244b the chorale No. 17 appears to be missing, and movement No. 29, concluding Part One, is a four-part setting of the chorale "Jesum lass ich nicht von mir" instead of the chorale fantasia on "O Mensch, bewein dein Sünde groß".

== Composition ==
Many composers wrote musical settings of the Passion in the late 17th century. Like other Baroque oratorio passions, Bach's St Matthew Passion presents the Biblical story of Christ's crucifixion (in this case as recorded in Matthew 26–27) in a relatively simple way, primarily using recitative, while aria and arioso movements set newly-written poetic texts that explore the emotions elicited by the narrated events, and choral movements present more "corporate" perspectives, whether of groups of people within the narrative or on behalf of the congregation and humanity generally, in response to it.

The St Matthew Passion is set for two choirs and two orchestras. Both orchestras include two transverse flutes (Orchestra 1 also requires 2 recorders for No. 19), two oboes (replaced in certain movements by oboe d'amore or oboe da caccia, two violins, viola, viola da gamba, and basso continuo. For practical reasons one continuo organ often plays with both orchestras. In many arias a solo instrument or more create a specific mood, and in the central soprano aria No. 49, "Aus Liebe will mein Heiland sterben", the absence of crucial instruments (strings and basso continuo) symbolizes insecurity and desperation.

=== Vocal parts ===
Two distinctive aspects of Bach's setting spring from his other church endeavors. One, the use of two SATB choruses in tandem, reflects Bach's habit of starting Sunday services at the Thomaskirche with the performance of a double-choir motet (a practice which in turn reflects a feature of the church's architecture: namely, its two separate, facing, organ lofts). The other aspect, the extensive use of chorales, is rooted in the centrality of the chorale repertoire in the Lutheran church of Bach's time, and in Bach's notable use of that repertoire as a rich source of musical material and spiritual inspiration. Bach uses chorale melodies in several different ways in the St Matthew Passion: in stand-alone four-part homophonic settings, as interpolations in arias, and as canti firmi in large polyphonic movements. Even the apparently simple four-part harmonizations imaginatively exploit elements such as tonality, range, melodic shape, chromaticism, and dissonance to enhance the expression of the text being sung. And Bach's use of chorale melodies as canti firmi in choruses like "O Mensch, bewein dein Sünde groß", the conclusion of the first half, not only adds to the complexity and impressiveness of the counterpoint, but helps to delineate the movement's structure. Similarly, in the great opening chorus, "Kommt, ihr Töchter, helft mir klagen," the imposition of the venerable chorale "O Lamm Gottes, unschuldig," one majestic phrase at a time, upon the polyphonic and harmonic tension built up by two orchestras and two choirs, helps to hold this colossal movement together.

=== Gospel text ===
End of the aria with chorus No. 60, and beginning of the recitative No. 61a (Bible words written in red) in Bach's autograph score: the recitative contains Christ's last words, and the only words by Christ sung without the characteristic string section accompaniment ("Eli, Eli lama asabthani?")

Matthew's narration of the events surrounding Christ's crucifixion is sung by the tenor Evangelist in secco recitative style (accompanied only by continuo). Within that narration, speeches attributed to specific characters are sung (mostly in the same recitative style) by soloists of various voice-types. Eleven such characters are identified by name or function in the St Matthew Passion: Jesus, Judas, Peter, two high priests (Pontifex I & II), Pontius Pilate, Pilate's wife (Uxor Pilati), two witnesses (Testis I & II), and two maids (Ancillae). These "roles" are not necessarily sung by 11 different performers, and character soloists may also perform arias and/or sing with the choirs, making it possible for the work to be performed with fewer singers.

The words of Jesus (also termed Vox Christi) receive special treatment throughout the Passion: they are set as accompagnato recitatives in which all the strings of orchestra 1 sustain the underlying harmonies and sometimes also highlight certain words. The effect produced has been well described as a "halo," and, significantly, only Christ's final words, in Aramaic, Eli, Eli, lama asabthani? (My God, my God, why have you forsaken me?) are sung without this timbral and textural enhancement.

In the revision of 1743–1746, it is only in the Vox Christi passages that the figured-bass line, representing the continuo part, is notated as sustained. In prior versions (1727/1729, 1736, and 1742), the continuo bass notes were notated as sustained in all recitatives.

Words attributed in the Biblical text to groups of people are sung by one or both of the choirs. These passages are sometimes called turba (crowd) choruses.

==== Interpolated texts ====
The arias, set to texts by Picander, are interspersed between sections of the Gospel text. They are sung by soloists, with a variety of instrumental accompaniments, as is typical of the oratorio style. The interpolated texts theologically and personally interpret the Gospel texts. Sometimes they bring the listener into the action, as when the chorale (No. 10) "Ich bin's, ich sollte büßen" ("It is I, I should suffer"), provides the unexpected answer to the question asked in No. 9 by each of the disciples in turn: "Herr, bin ich's?" (Lord, is it I [who will betray You]?) In the aria "Buß und Reu" (No. 6), the alto sings of her desire to anoint Jesus with her tears of remorse. The bass aria (No. 65) "Mache dich, mein Herze, rein", offers to bury Jesus if it will make a dire situation any better. In the arias generally Christ is often referred to as "my Jesus." The chorus alternates between participating in the narrative and commenting on it.

As is typical of settings of the Passion (and originating in its liturgical use on Palm Sunday), there is no mention of the Resurrection in any of these texts (apart from indirect allusions at Matthew 26:32 and 27:53 and 63). Following the concept of Anselm of Canterbury, the crucifixion is the endpoint and the source of redemption; the emphasis is on the suffering of Jesus. The chorus sings, in the final chorale No. 62, "tear me from my fears / through your own fear and pain." The bass, referring to the "sweet cross" expresses in No. 56, "Yes, of course this flesh and blood in us / want to be forced to the cross; / the better it is for our soul, / the more bitter it feels."

The first "O Lamm Gottes" chorale compares Jesus' crucifixion to the ritual sacrifice of an Old Testament lamb, as an offering for sin. This theme is reinforced by the concluding chorale of the first part, O Mensch, bewein dein' Sünde groß (O man, bewail your great sin).

=== Compositional style ===
Bach's recitatives often set the mood for the particular passages by highlighting emotionally charged words such as "crucify", "kill", or "mourn" with chromatic melodies. Diminished seventh chords and sudden modulations accompany Jesus's apocalyptic prophecies.

In the turba parts, the two choruses sometimes alternate in cori spezzati style (e.g. "Weissage uns, Christe") and sometimes sing together ("Herr, wir haben gedacht"). Other times only one chorus sings (chorus I always takes the parts of the disciples), or they alternate, for example when "some bystanders" say "He's calling for Elijah", and "others" say "Wait to see if Elijah comes to help him."

In the arias, obbligato instruments are equal partners with the voices, as was customary in late Baroque arias. Bach often uses madrigalisms, as in "Buß und Reu", where the flutes start playing a raindrop-like staccato as the alto sings of falling teardrops. In "Blute nur," a line about a serpent is set to a twisting melody. In "Erbarm es, Gott," a relentless dotted rhythm and diminished chords evoke the scourging endured by Jesus before he was put to death.

== Structure ==
As in other Passion oratorios the backbone of the structure is the narration of the Gospel, in this case chapters 26 and 27 of the Gospel of Matthew in the Luther Bible.

=== Gospel text ===
The Evangelist, a tenor voice, sings the Gospel text in a declamatory style called secco recitative, that is, with only a continuo accompaniment. Direct speech sections of the Gospel text are brought by other singers in the same "secco" format (e.g. a soprano voice sings the words spoken by Pontius Pilate's wife), except for:

- Vox Christi: the words spoken by Christ are sung by a bass as an accompagnato recitative, that is: accompanied by strings, and in a more arioso style than the secco recitatives.
- Turba choruses: words spoken by a group of people (e.g. Jesus' disciples) are sung by the choir, usually accompanied by the complete orchestra.

Apart from the Evangelist and the Vox Christi the dramatis personae of these Gospel sections of the St Matthew Passion consists of:

- Judas (B), Peter (B), two witnesses (A T), two high priests (B), two maids (S), Pilate (B) and his wife (S)
- A small group is represented by Chorus I or Chorus II separately (Chorus I always for the disciples); High priests and larger groups of people are sung by Chorus I and II together.

=== Interpolated text ===
In between the sections or scenes of the Gospel text, other texts are sung as a meditation or underlining the action, in a variety of formats:

- soloists sing arias, in most cases preceded by an accompagnato recitative, and occasionally in a dialogue with the choir. These sections are based nearly exclusively on texts by Picander. The arias are in da capo format (ternary form). "Erbarme dich", for alto, and "Mache dich, mein Herze, rein", for bass, are examples of such arias in Part Two of the oratorio. In these movements the singers are accompanied by one or a few solo instruments and continuo, occasionally completed by other instrument groups of the orchestra.
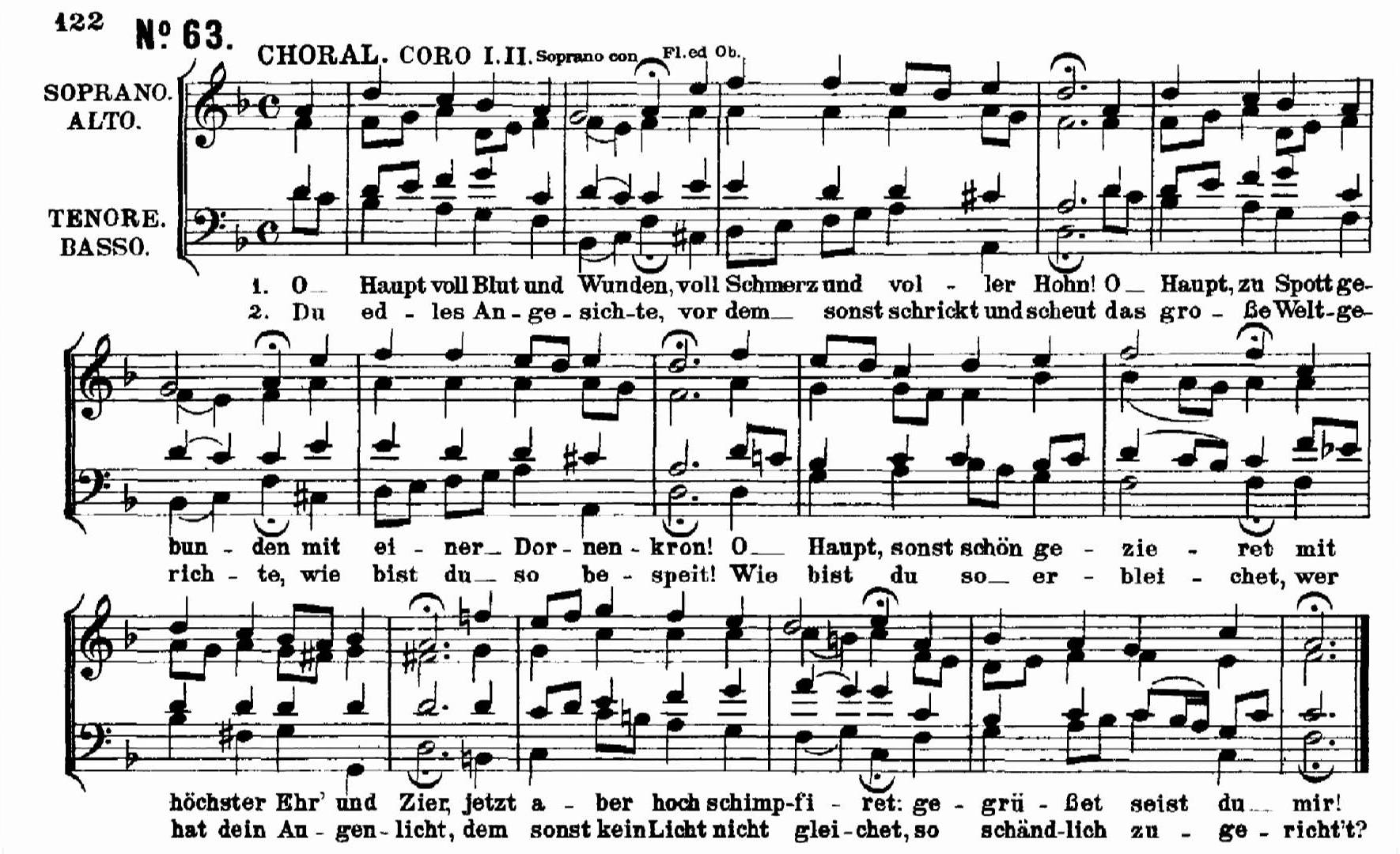
  "O Haupt voll Blut und Wunden", vocal score
- Choral movements come in two additional formats (apart from the turba and dialogue with soloist roles already mentioned above):
  - Cornerstone choral movements, or chorale fantasias: these are the extended movements, typically used to open or close both parts of the oratorio. In the St Matthew Passion there are three such extended choral movements: the opening chorus ("Kommt, ihr Töchter, helft mir klagen", text by Picander and Nicolaus Decius), the conclusion of Part One ("O Mensch, bewein dein Sünde groß", text by Sebald Heyden) and the final chorus ("Wir setzen uns mit Tränen nieder", text by Picander)
  - Chorale harmonization movements: using traditional chorale texts and their melodies. The text is sung in homophony by a four-part chorus with colla parte accompaniment by the orchestra. "O Haupt voll Blut und Wunden", on a text by Paul Gerhardt, is the one that returns most often throughout the Passion, in different harmonizations.

=== Overview ===
In the scheme below indentation indicates the type of movement:

|→ Cornerstone choral movements

|→ Gospel parts (including Vox Christi and Turba sections) – Evangelist sings in each of these Gospel sections

|→ Chorale harmonizations

|→ (Non-Gospel) Recitatives and Arias (with or without dialogue with the chorus)

==== Part One ====
1. Kommt, ihr Töchter, helft mir klagen – O Lamm Gottes unschuldig (Chorus I & II – Cantus firmus by ripieno soprano choir)

2. Mt 26:1–2, with Vox Christi

3. Herzliebster Jesu, was hast du verbrochen

4. Mt 26:3–13, with Vox Christi, and Turba on Ja nicht auf das Fest (Chorus I & II) and on Wozu dienet dieser Unrat? (Chorus I)

5–6. Recitative Du lieber Heiland du and Aria Buß und Reu (alto)

7. Mt 26:14–16, with Judas (bass)

8. Aria Blute nur, du liebes Herz! (soprano)

9. Mt 26:17–22, with Vox Christi, and Turba on Wo willst du, daß wir dir bereiten das Osterlamm zu essen? (Chorus I) and on Herr, bin ich's? (Chorus I)

10. "O Welt, sieh hier dein Leben" by Paul Gerhardt, stanza 5: Ich bin's, ich sollte büßen

11. Mt 26:23–29, with Vox Christi and Judas (bass)

12–13. Recitative Wiewohl mein Herz in Tränen schwimmt and Aria Ich will dir mein Herze schenken (soprano)

14. Mt 26:30–32, with Vox Christi

15. "O Haupt voll Blut und Wunden" by Paul Gerhardt, stanza 5: Erkenne mich, mein Hüter

16. Mt 26:33–35, with Vox Christi and Peter (bass)

17. "O Haupt voll Blut und Wunden" by Paul Gerhardt, stanza 6: Ich will hier bei dir stehen [1727/1729 version without music and text "Es dient zu meinem Freude"]

18. Mt 26:36–38, with Vox Christi

19–20. Recitative O Schmerz! Hier zittert das gequälte Herz – "Herzliebster Jesu" by Johann Heermann, stanza 3: Was ist die Ursach aller solcher Plagen? and Aria Ich will bei meinem Jesu wachen – So schlafen unsre Sünden ein (tenor – Chorus II)

21. Mt 26:39

22–23. Recitative Der Heiland fällt vor seinem Vater nieder and Aria Gerne will ich mich bequemen, Kreuz und Becher anzunehmen (bass)

24. Mt 26:40–42, with Vox Christi

25. "Was mein Gott will, das g'scheh allzeit" by Albert, Duke in Prussia, stanza 1: Was mein Gott will, das g'scheh allzeit

26. Mt 26:43–50, with Vox Christi and Judas (bass)

27. Aria So ist mein Jesus nun gefangen – Laßt ihn, haltet, bindet nicht! (soprano, alto – Chorus II) and Sind Blitze, sind Donner in Wolken verschwunden? (Chorus I & II)

28. Mt 26:51–56, with Vox Christi

29. O Mensch, bewein dein Sünde groß (Chorale fantasy, text by Sebald Heyden) [1727/1729 version: "Jesum lass ich nicht von mir"; 1742 and 1743–1746 versions: ripieno soprano choir added to soprano line]

==== Part Two ====
30. Aria Ach, nun ist mein Jesus hin! – Wo ist denn dein Freund hingegangen (alto [bass in the 1727/1729 version] – Chorus II)

31. Mt 26:57–60a

32. "In dich hab ich gehoffet, Herr" by Adam Reusner, stanza 5: Mir hat die Welt trüglich gericht't

33. Mt 26:60b–63a, with Witnesses (alt, tenor) and High Priest (bass)

34–35. Recitative Mein Jesus schweigt zu falschen Lügen stille and Aria Geduld, Geduld! Wenn mich falsche Zungen stechen (tenor)

36. Mt 26:63b–68, with Vox Christi, High Priest (bass), and Turba on Er ist des Todes schuldig! (Chorus I & II), and on Weissage uns, Christe, wer ists, der dich schlug? (Chorus I & II)

37. "O Welt, sieh hier dein Leben" by Paul Gerhardt, stanza 3: Wer hat dich so geschlagen

38. Mt 26:69–75, with Maid I and II (sopranos), Peter (bass) and Turba on Wahrlich, du bist auch einer von denen; denn deine Sprache verrät dich. (Chorus II)

39. Aria Erbarme dich, mein Gott, um meiner Zähren Willen! (alto)

40. "Werde munter, mein Gemüte" by Johann Rist, stanza 6: Bin ich gleich von dir gewichen

41. Mt 27:1–6, with Judas (bass), High Priest I and II (basses) and Turba on Was gehet uns das an? Da siehe du zu! (Chorus I & II)

42. Aria Gebt mir meinen Jesum wieder! (bass)

43. Mt 27:7–14, with Vox Christi and Pilate (bass)

44. "Befiehl du deine Wege" by Paul Gerhardt, stanza 1: Befiehl du deine Wege

45. Mt 27:15–22, with Pilate (bass), Pilate's wife (soprano), and Turba on Barrabam! (Chorus I & II), and on Laß ihn kreuzigen! (Chorus I & II)

46. "Herzliebster Jesu" by Johann Heermann, stanza 4: Wie wunderbarlich ist doch diese Strafe!

47. Mt 27:23a, with Pilate (bass)

48–49. Recitative Er hat uns allen wohlgetan and Aria Aus Liebe will mein Heiland sterben (soprano)

50. Mt 27:23b–26, with Pilate (bass), and Turba on Laß ihn kreuzigen! (Chorus I & II), and on Sein Blut komme über uns und unsre Kinder. (Chorus I & II)

51–52. Recitative Erbarm es, Gott! Hier steht der Heiland angebunden. and Aria Können Tränen meiner Wangen (alto)

53. Mt 27:27–30, with Turba on Gegrüßet seist du, Jüdenkönig! (Chorus I & II)

54. "O Haupt voll Blut und Wunden" by Paul Gerhardt, stanza 1 and 2: O Haupt, voll Blut und Wunden

55. Mt 27:31–32

56–57. Recitative Ja, freilich will in uns das Fleisch und Blut zum Kreuz gezwungen sein and Aria Komm, süßes Kreuz, so will ich sagen (bass)

58. Mt 27:33–44, with Turba on Der du den Tempel Gottes zerbrichst (Chorus I & II), and on Andern hat er geholfen und kann ihm selber nicht helfen. (Chorus I & II)

59–60. Recitative Ach Golgatha, unselges Golgatha! and Aria Sehet, Jesus hat die Hand uns zu fassen ausgespannt, kommt! – Wohin? (alto – Chorus II)

61. Mt 27:45–50, with Vox Christi, and Turba on Der rufet dem Elias! (Chorus I), and on Halt! Laß sehen, ob Elias komme und ihm helfe. (Chorus II)

62. "O Haupt voll Blut und Wunden" by Paul Gerhardt, stanza 9: Wenn ich einmal soll scheiden

63. Mt 27:51–59, with Turba on Wahrlich, dieser ist Gottes Sohn gewesen. (Chorus I & II)

64–65. Recitative Am Abend, da es kühle war and Aria Mache dich, mein Herze, rein (bass)

66. Mt 27:59–66, with Pilate (bass), and Turba on Herr, wir haben gedacht, daß dieser Verführer sprach (Chorus I & II)

67. Recitative Nun ist der Herr zur Ruh gebracht – Mein Jesu, gute Nacht! (bass, tenor, alto, soprano – Chorus II)

68. Wir setzen uns mit Tränen nieder (Chorus I & II)

== Movements ==
The work is divided into two parts to be performed before and after the sermon of the Good Friday service.

=== Part One ===
The first scenes are in Jerusalem: Jesus announces his death (No. 2), on the other hand the intention to get rid of him is expressed (No. 4). A scene in Bethany (No. 4c) shows a woman anointing his head with valuable oils. The next scene (No. 7) has Judas Iscariot negotiating the price for handing Jesus over. In a great contrast of mood the preparation for the "Easter meal" (Osterlamm) is described (No. 9) and the Passover meal itself, the Last Supper, foreshadowed by the announcement of betrayal. After the meal they go together to the Mount of Olives (No. 14) where Jesus predicts that Peter will deny him three times before the cock crows. At the garden of Gethsemane (No. 18) Jesus asks his followers several times to support him but they fall asleep while he is praying in agony. It is there (No. 26) that he is betrayed by Judas' kiss and arrested. While soprano and alto mourn (in duet, No. 27a) Jesus's arrest, the chorus makes angry interjections of "Laßt ihn, haltet, bindet nicht!" (Leave him, stop, do not bind him!). In a dramatic highpoint of the Passion, the chorus (No. 27b) furiously demands against the Jews who arrested Jesus "Zertrümmre, verderbe, verschlinge, zerschelle / Mit plötzlicher Wut / Den falschen Verräter, das mördrische Blut!" (Wreck, ruin, engulf, shatter with sudden force the false betrayer, the murderous blood!).

==== 1. Kommt, ihr Töchter, helft mir klagen ====
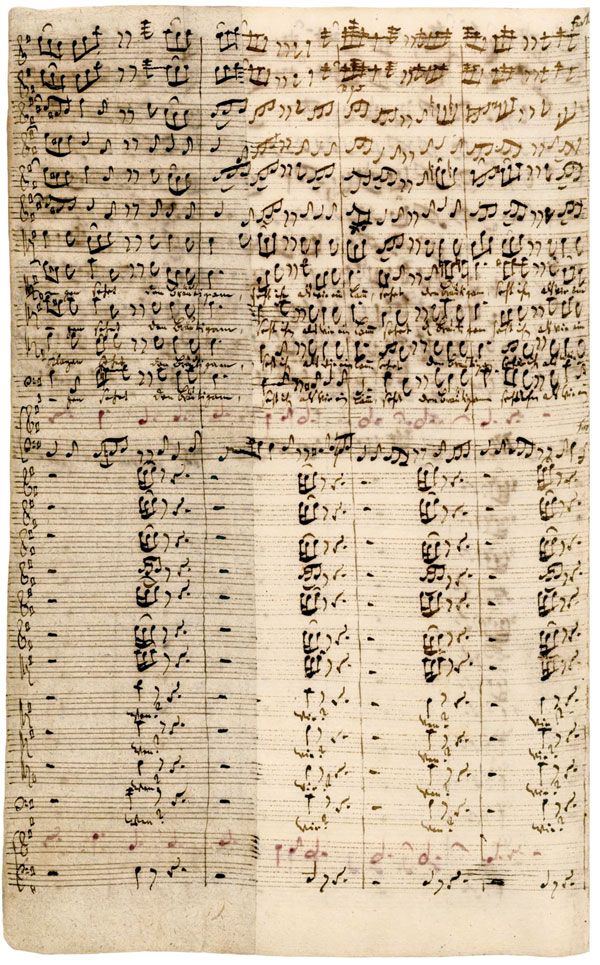
The melody of Am Stamm des Kreuzes geschlachtet (slaughtered at the stem of the cross), the second line of Decius' chorale, is shown twice in red ink, without the words, on this page of Bach's autograph score: in the middle of the page for the ripienists, and in the upper of the two staves for organ II at the bottom of the page.

Part One is opened by the chorus "Kommt, ihr Töchter, helft mir klagen" (Come ye daughters, join my lament), on a text by Picander. After 16 measures of instrumental introduction in 12/8 time, driven by an ostinato rhythm in the basses, Chorus I intones Kommt, ihr Töchter, helft mir klagen, until in measure 26 they sing Sehet (Hark!) and Chorus II promptly asks Wen? (Whom?), Chorus I replying with den Bräutigam (the bridegroom – implying Christ). The next call by Chorus I is Seht ihn (See him!), followed by the question Wie? (How?) by Chorus II, to which Chorus I answers als wie ein Lamm (just like a lamb – another reference to Christ).

The dialogue with these questions is repeated, and then, from measure 30, Chorus I sings the text of the incipit again while in ripieno sopranos sing the first two lines of Nikolaus Decius' chorale "O Lamm Gottes, unschuldig" (O Lamb of God, innocent) as the cantus firmus. All sentences of the first stanza of Decius' hymn are used as cantus firmus throughout the movement by the ripienists.

The opening chorus continues by taking up the questions and answers by Chorus I and II again, now adding: Sehet — Was? — seht die Geduld (See it! — What? – See the endurance) and ultimately Seht — Wohin? — auf unsre Schuld (Look! — Where? — to our guilt), after which Chorus I and II sing the last lines of Picander's text in separate blocks. When the cantus firmus has died out, Chorus I and II return to the first three lines of the text, from measure 82 until the conclusion of the chorus in measure 90.

Opening chorus, measure 17–18, vocal part of Chorus I

Last measures of movement 1 and start of movement 2 in Bach's autograph score

==== 2. Mt 26:1–2 ====
2. Evangelist, Jesus: Da Jesus diese Rede vollendet hatte

Matthew 26:1–2 places the first scene two days before the Passover feast. After a few words of introduction by the Evangelist, the first words of Christ, set as an accompagnato recitative with slow strings, contain an ominous prediction of his imminent fate.

==== 3. Herzliebster Jesu, was hast du verbrochen ====
Chorale: first stanza of Johann Heermann's "Herzliebster Jesu". The first two lines of the hymn are a rhetorical question: "My dearest Jesus, which crimes have you committed, that such dire judgement has been passed?"

==== 4. Mt 26:3–13 ====
4a. Evangelist: Da versammleten sich die Hohenpriester und Schriftgelehrten
4b. Chorus I & II: Ja nicht auf das Fest
4c. Evangelist: Da nun Jesus war zu Bethanien
4d. Chorus I: Wozu dienet dieser Unrat?
4e. Evangelist, Jesus: Da das Jesus merkete, sprach er zu ihnen

==== 5–6. Du lieber Heiland du – Buß und Reu ====
Recitative and Aria for alto.

==== 7. Mt 26:14–16 ====
7. Evangelist, Judas: Da ging hin der Zwölfen einer mit Namen Judas Ischarioth

==== 8. Blute nur, du liebes Herz! ====
Aria (soprano)

==== 9. Mt 26:17–22 ====
9a. Evangelist: Aber am ersten Tage der süßen Brot
9b. Chorus I: Wo willst du, daß wir dir bereiten das Osterlamm zu essen?
9c. Evangelist, Jesus: Er sprach: Gehet hin in die Stadt
9d. Evangelist: Und sie wurden sehr betrübt
9e. Chorus I: Herr, bin ich's?

The narration follows Jesus' instructions for securing the upper room for Passover, and the beginning of the Last Supper. Upon Jesus' declaration that one of the twelve will betray him in 9d, they ask him "Lord, is it I?" The word Herr appears 11 times, once for each disciple except Judas Iscariot.

==== 10. Ich bin's, ich sollte büßen ====
Chorale

==== 11. Mt 26:23–29 ====
11. Evangelist, Jesus, Judas: Er antwortete und sprach

==== 12–13. Wiewohl mein Herz in Tränen schwimmt – Ich will dir mein Herze schenken ====
Recitative and Aria (soprano)

==== 14. Mt 26:30–32 ====
14. Evangelist, Jesus: Und da sie den Lobgesang gesprochen hatten

==== 15. Erkenne mich, mein Hüter ====
Chorale

==== 16. Mt 26:33–35 ====
16. Evangelist, Peter, Jesus: Petrus aber antwortete und sprach zu ihm

==== 17. Ich will hier bei dir stehen ====
Chorale

In the 1727/1729 version without music and text "Es dient zu meinem Freude"

==== 18. Mt 26:36–38 ====
18. Evangelist, Jesus: Da kam Jesus mit ihnen zu einem Hofe, der hieß Gethsemane

==== 19–20. O Schmerz! Hier zittert das gequälte Herz – Ich will bei meinem Jesu wachen ====
Recitative (with Chorus II: Was ist die Ursach aller solcher Plagen?) and Aria (with Chorus II: So schlafen unsre Sünden ein) for tenor

==== 21. Mt 26:39 ====
21. Evangelist: Und ging hin ein wenig, fiel nieder auf sein Angesicht und betete

==== 22–23. Der Heiland fällt vor seinem Vater nieder – Gerne will ich mich bequemen, Kreuz und Becher anzunehmen ====
Recitative and Aria (bass)

==== 24. Mt 26:40–42 ====
24. Evangelist, Jesus: Und er kam zu seinen Jüngern und fand sie schlafend

==== 25. Was mein Gott will, das g'scheh allzeit ====
Chorale

==== 26. Mt 26:43–50 ====
26. Evangelist, Jesus, Judas: Und er kam und fand sie aber schlafend

==== 27. So ist mein Jesus nun gefangen – Sind Blitze, sind Donner in Wolken verschwunden? ====
Aria for soprano and alto (with Chorus II: Laßt ihn, haltet, bindet nicht!) and Chorus (I & II)

==== 28. Mt 26:51–56 ====
28. Evangelist, Jesus: Und siehe, einer aus denen, die mit Jesu waren, reckete die Hand aus

==== 29. O Mensch, bewein dein Sünde groß ====
Part I is closed by a four-part Chorale Fantasia (both choirs) on the chorale O Mensch, bewein dein Sünde groß (O mankind, mourn your great sins), recapitulating that Jesus was born of the Virgin to "become the intercessor". The sopranos sing the cantus firmus, the other voices interpret aspects of the narration. In the 1742 and 1743–1746 versions, a ripieno soprano choir was added to the soprano line.

In the 1727/1729 version, this part is concluded by a four-part setting of verse 6 of the Chorale "Meinen Jesum laß ich nicht (Jesum laß ich nicht von mir)".

=== Part Two ===
The first scene of Part Two is an interrogation at the High Priest Caiaphas (No. 37) where two witnesses report Jesus having spoken about destroying the Temple and building it again in three days. Jesus is silent to this, but his answer to the question if he is the Son of God is considered a sacrilege calling for his death. Outside in the courtyard (No. 38) Peter is told three times that he belongs to Jesus and denies it three times – then the cock crows. In the morning (No. 41) Jesus is sent to Pontius Pilate while Judas is overcome by remorse and kills himself. Pilate interrogates Jesus (No. 43), is impressed and is inclined to release him, as it was customary to release one prisoner for the holiday, supported in this by his wife. But the crowd, given the choice to have Jesus released or Barabbas, a thief, insurrectionist and murderer, asks with one voice "Barrabam!". They vote to crucify Jesus, Pilate gives in, washing his hands claiming his innocence, and delivers Jesus to torture and crucifixion. On the way to the crucifixion site (No. 55) Simon of Cyrene is forced to carry the cross. At Golgatha (No. 58) Jesus and two others are crucified and mocked by the crowd. Even his last words are misunderstood. Where he cites Psalm 22, "Eli, Eli, lama asabthani?" (My God, my God, why have you forsaken me?), he is supposed to have called Elijah. He dies. St. Matthew describes the tearing of the Temple curtain and an earthquake – set to music by Bach. In the evening (No. 63c) Joseph of Arimathea asks Pilate for the corpse for burial. The following day (No. 66) officials remind Pilate of the talk of resurrection and ask for guards and a seal for the grave to prevent fraud.

==== 30. Ach, nun ist mein Jesus hin! ====
Part Two is opened by a dialog between the alto soloist deploring her lost Jesus and choir II offering help in searching for him, quoting Song of Songs 6:1 (Wo ist denn dein Freund hingegangen). In the 1727/1729 version, the soloist is a bass.

==== 31. Mt 26:57–60a ====
31. Evangelist: Die aber Jesum gegriffen hatten, führeten ihn zu dem Hohenpriester Kaiphas

==== 32. Mir hat die Welt trüglich gericht't ====
Chorale

==== 33. Mt 26:60b–63a ====
33. Evangelist, Witnesses, High Priest: Und wiewohl viel falsche Zeugen herzutraten, funden sie doch keins.

==== 34–35. Mein Jesus schweigt zu falschen Lügen stille – Geduld, Geduld! Wenn mich falsche Zungen stechen ====
Recitative and Aria (tenor)

==== 36. Mt 26:63b–68 ====
36a. Evangelist, High Priest, Jesus: Und der Hohenpriester antwortete
36b. Chorus I & II: Er ist des Todes schuldig!
36c. Evangelist: Da speieten sie in sein Angesicht und schlugen ihn mit Fäusten
36d. Chorus I & II: Weissage uns, Christe, wer ists, der dich schlug?

==== 37. Wer hat dich so geschlagen ====
Chorale

==== 38. Mt 26:69–75 ====
38a. Evangelist, Maid, Peter, Maid II: Petrus aber saß draußen im Palast; und es trat zu ihm eine Magd
38b. Chorus II: Wahrlich, du bist auch einer von denen; denn deine Sprache verrät dich.
38c. Evangelist, Peter: Da hub er an sich zu verfluchen und zu schwören

==== 39. Erbarme dich, mein Gott, um meiner Zähren Willen! ====
Aria (alto)

==== 40. Bin ich gleich von dir gewichen ====
Chorale

==== 41. Mt 27:1–6 ====
41a. Evangelist, Judas: Des Morgens aber hielten alle Hohepriester und die Ältesten des Volks einen Rat
41b. Chorus I & II: Was gehet uns das an? Da siehe du zu!
41c. Evangelist, High Priests: Und er warf die Silberlinge in den Tempel

==== 42. Gebt mir meinen Jesum wieder! ====
Aria (bass) with violin

==== 43. Mt 27:7–14 ====
43. Evangelist, Pilate, Jesus: Sie hielten aber einen Rat und kauften einen Töpfersacker

==== 44. Befiehl du deine Wege ====
Chorale

==== 45. Mt 27:15–22 ====
45a. Evangelist, Pilate, Pilate's wife: Auf das Fest aber hatte der Landpfleger Gewohnheit, dem Volk einen Gefangenen loszugeben
Chorus I & II: Barrabam!
45b. Chorus I & II: Laß ihn kreuzigen!

==== 46. Wie wunderbarlich ist doch diese Strafe! ====
Chorale

==== 47. Mt 27:23a ====
47. Evangelist, Pilate: Der Landpfleger sagte

==== 48–49. Er hat uns allen wohlgetan – Aus Liebe will mein Heiland sterben ====
Recitative and Aria (soprano)

==== 50. Mt 27:23b–26 ====
50a. Evangelist: Sie schrieen aber noch mehr und sprachen
50b. Chorus I & II: Laß ihn kreuzigen!
50c. Evangelist, Pilate: Da aber Pilatus sahe, daß er nichts schaffete
50d. Chorus I & II: Sein Blut komme über uns und unsre Kinder.
50e. Evangelist: Da gab er ihnen Barrabam los

==== 51–52. Erbarm es, Gott! Hier steht der Heiland angebunden. – Können Tränen meiner Wangen ====
Recitative and Aria (alto)

==== 53. Mt 27:27–30 ====
53a. Evangelist: Da nahmen die Kriegsknechte des Landpflegers Jesum zu sich
53b. Chorus I & II: Gegrüßet seist du, Jüdenkönig!
53c. Evangelist: Und speieten ihn an und nahmen das Rohr und schlugen damit sein Haupt.

==== 54. O Haupt, voll Blut und Wunden ====
Chorale

==== 55. Mt 27:31–32 ====
55. Evangelist: Und da sie ihn verspottet hatten, zogen sie ihm den Mantel aus

==== 56–57. Ja, freilich will in uns das Fleisch und Blut zum Kreuz gezwungen sein – Komm, süßes Kreuz, so will ich sagen ====
Recitative and Aria (bass) Lute instead of Viola da gamba in 1727/1729 version.

==== 58. Mt 27:33–44 ====
58a. Evangelist: Und da sie an die Stätte kamen mit Namen Golgatha
58b. Chorus I & II: Der du den Tempel Gottes zerbrichst
58c. Evangelist: Desgleichen auch die Hohenpriester spotteten sein
58d. Chorus I & II: Andern hat er geholfen und kann ihm selber nicht helfen.
58e. Evangelist: Desgleichen schmäheten ihn auch die Mörder, die mit ihm gekreuziget waren

==== 59–60. Ach Golgatha, unselges Golgatha! – Sehet, Jesus hat die Hand uns zu fassen ausgespannt, kommt! ====
Recitative and Aria for alto (from Chorus I), with a dialogue with Chorus II ("Wohin?") in the Aria

==== 61. Mt 27:45–50 ====
61a. Evangelist, Jesus: Und von der sechsten Stunde an war eine Finsternis über das ganze Land
61b. Chorus I: Der rufet dem Elias!
61c. Evangelist: Und bald lief einer unter ihnen, nahm einen Schwamm
61d. Chorus II: Halt! Laß sehen, ob Elias komme und ihm helfe.
61e. Evangelist: Aber Jesus schriee abermal laut und verschied.

==== 62. Wenn ich einmal soll scheiden ====
Chorale

This is by far the most unusually chromatic setting of this chorale tune (Befiehl du deine Wege / O Haupt, voll Blut und Wunden) found in the Passion, occurring at the high point of intensity at the death of Jesus. This also marks the completion of Bach's gradual emptying out of the key signature in subsequent settings of this tune: No. 15 has four sharps (E major), No. 17 has three flats (E-flat major), No. 44 has two sharps (D major), No. 54 has one flat (D minor), and No. 62 has no accidentals (A minor).

==== 63. Mt 27:51–59 ====
63a. Evangelist: Und siehe da, der Vorhang im Tempel zerriß in zwei Stück
63b. Chorus I & II: Wahrlich, dieser ist Gottes Sohn gewesen.
63c. Evangelist: Und es waren viel Weiber da, die von ferne zusahen

==== 64–65. Am Abend, da es kühle war – Mache dich, mein Herze, rein ====
Recitative and Aria (bass)

==== 66. Mt 27:59–66 ====
66a. Evangelist: Und Joseph nahm den Leib und wickelte ihn in ein rein Leinwand
66b. Chorus I & II: Herr, wir haben gedacht, daß dieser Verführer sprach
66c. Evangelist, Pilate: Pilatus sprach zu ihnen

==== 67. Nun ist der Herr zur Ruh gebracht. ====
Recitative for bass, tenor, alto and soprano, with Chorus II singing Mein Jesu, gute Nacht!.

==== 68. Wir setzen uns mit Tränen nieder ====
The work is closed by a grand scale chorus in da capo form, choir I and II mostly in unison for the first part Wir setzen uns mit Tränen nieder (We sit down in tears), but in dialog in the middle section, choir II repeating "Ruhe sanfte, sanfte ruh!" ("Rest gently, gently rest!"), choir I reflecting: "Your grave and headstone shall, for the anxious conscience, be a comfortable pillow and the resting place for the soul. Highly contented, there the eyes fall asleep." These are the last words (before the recapitulation), marked by Bach himself: p pp ppp (soft, very soft, extremely soft).

== Reception ==
The St Matthew Passion was not heard in more or less its entirety outside Leipzig until 1829, when the twenty-year-old Felix Mendelssohn performed a version in Berlin, with the Berlin Singakademie, to great acclaim. Though most remained the same, Mendelssohn did edit parts of the passion to satisfy the taste of the time. Due to the changes in addition with other circumstances the reception was a success. Mendelssohn's revival brought the music of Bach, particularly the large-scale works, to public and scholarly attention (although the St John Passion had been rehearsed by the Singakademie in 1822).

Sterndale Bennett 1845 edition of the Passion was to be the first of many (as Adolph Bernhard Marx and Adolf Martin Schlesinger's one in 1830), the latest being by Neil Jenkins (1997) and Nicholas Fisher and John Russell (2008). Appreciation, performance and study of Bach's composition have persisted into the present era.

=== Second half of the 18th century ===
The Passion was performed under the Cantor of St. Thomas until about 1800. Specifically, in 1780, the Cantor, Doles, had three of Bach's Passions performed, assumed to include the St. John and St. Matthew, and "possibly the St. Luke".

=== 19th century ===
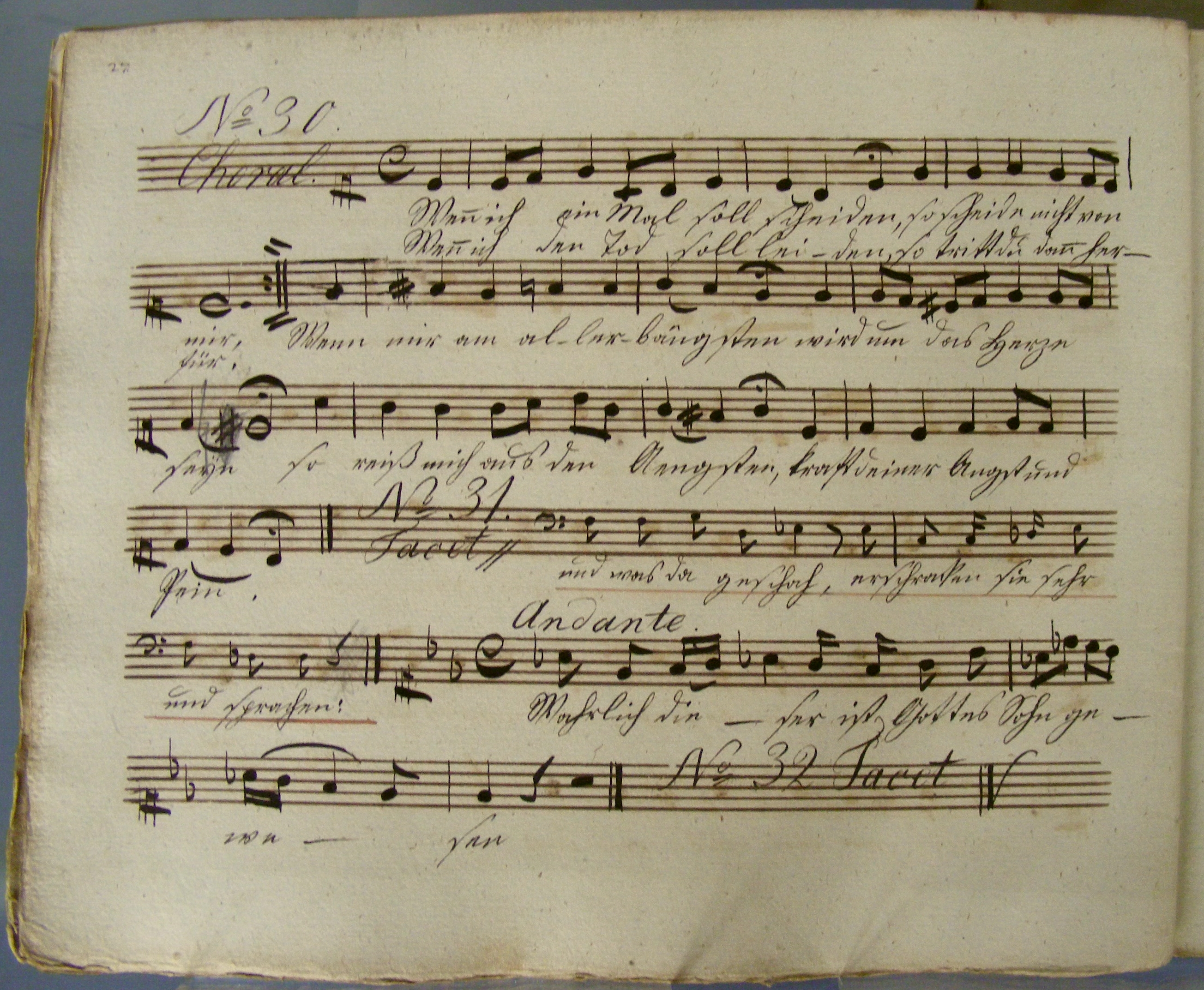
Performance part for Mendelssohn's 19th-century staging of the St Matthew Passion

In 1824, Felix Mendelssohn's maternal grandmother Bella Salomon had given him a copy of the score of the Passion. Carl Friedrich Zelter had been head of the Sing-Akademie since 1800. He had been hired to teach music theory to both Felix Mendelssohn and his sister Fanny. Zelter had a supply of J. S. Bach scores and was an admirer of Bach's music but he was reluctant to undertake public performances. (Note: An attempt to put on Handel's Judas Maccabeus had recently been "botched" despite long rehearsals.)

When Felix Mendelssohn was preparing his revival performance of the Passion in 1829 in Berlin (the first performance outside Leipzig), he cut out "ten arias (about a third of them), seven choruses (about half), [but] only a few of the chorales," which "emphasized the drama of the Passion story ... at the expense of the reflective and Italianate solo singing."

In 1827, Felix and a few friends began weekly sessions to rehearse the Passion. One of the group was Eduard Devrient, a baritone and since 1820 one of the principal singers at the Berlin Royal Opera. Around December 1828 – January 1829 Devrient persuaded Felix that the two of them should approach Zelter to get the Sing-Akademie to support their project. Devrient was especially enthusiastic, hoping to sing the part of Jesus as he eventually did. Zelter was reluctant but eventually gave his approval; that of the Singakademie board followed.

Once the fuller group of singers and the orchestra were brought in, Devrient recalled, participants were amazed at "the abundance of melodies, the rich expression of emotion, the passion, the singular style of declamation, and the force of the dramatic action." The 20-year-old Felix himself conducted the rehearsals and first two performances by the Singakademie.

Their first performance was effectively publicized in six consecutive issues of the Berliner Allgemeine Musikalische Zeitung, founded and edited by Adolf Bernhard Marx. It took place on 11 March 1829 and was sold out quickly. There was a second performance on 21 March, also sold out. In a third, on 18 April, Zelter conducted, and soon there were performances in Frankfurt (where a previously projected performance of the Passion had been upstaged by those in Berlin) and in Breslau and Stettin.

William Sterndale Bennett became a founder of the Bach Society of London in 1849 with the intention of introducing Bach's works to the English public. Helen Johnston (a student at Queen's College, London) translated the libretto of the Passion, and Bennett conducted the first English performance at the Hanover Square Rooms London on 6 April 1854 (the same year that it appeared in print by the Old Bach Society (Alte Bach-Gesellschaft). The soloists included Charlotte Helen Sainton-Dolby.

=== 20th century ===
Excerpts of the work were performed on the American television program Omnibus on 31 March 1957 in the episode "The Music of J.S. Bach". The presenter and explicator was Leonard Bernstein, who introduced the St Matthew Passion as "that glorious work that started me off on my own private passion for Bach."

The Hamburg Ballet presented a Saint Matthew Passion, created and choreographed by John Neumeier, at the Hamburg State Opera in 1981. The Hamburg Ballet production has been reproduced several times, including at the Brooklyn Academy of Music in New York in 1983 and the Los Angeles Opera in 2022. The Los Angeles Opera presentation involved "42 dancers, six singers, two choruses, and two mighty-in-sound chamber orchestras."

=== 21st century ===
Staged productions of the Passion include Lindy Hume's 2005 production for the Perth International Arts Festival, restaged in 2013 for Opera Queensland with Leif Aruhn-Solén, Sara Macliver, Tobias Cole; and Peter Sellars' 2010 production with the Berlin Philharmonic under Simon Rattle with Mark Padmore, Camilla Tilling, Magdalena Kožená, Topi Lehtipuu, Christian Gerhaher and Thomas Quasthoff.

== Transcriptions ==
- The final chorus Wir setzen uns mit Tränen nieder was transcribed for solo organ by Charles-Marie Widor in 1925, as part of the set of 6 pieces named Bach's Memento.

== Sources ==
- Amati-Camperi, Alexandra (March 2008). "J. S. Bach: Johannes-Passion". San Francisco Bach Choir. Archived from the original on 2015-07-12.
- Applegate, Celia (2005). Bach in Berlin: Nation and Culture in Mendelssohn's Revival of the St. Matthew Passion. Ithaca, London: Cornell University Press.
- Bach-digital:
  - St. Matthew passion BWV 244
  - Klagt, Kinder, klagt es aller Welt BWV 244a
  - St Matthew Passion (early version) BWV 244b
- Picander (Christian Friedrich Henrici) (1729). Ernst-Scherzhaffte und Satyrische Gedichte: Anderer Theil. Leipzig. Second edition: 1734.
- Spitta, Philipp. "Fünftes Buch: Leipziger Jahre von 1723–1734" in Johann Sebastian Bach, Zweiter Band. Breitkopf & Härtel, 1880.
  - "Fünftes Buch: Leipziger Jahre von 1723–1734" pp. 3–479 in Johann Sebastian Bach, Zweiter Band. Dritte unveränderte Auflage, Leipzig: Breitkopf & Härtel, 1921.
  - "Book V: Leipzig, 1723–1734" pp. 181–648 in Johann Sebastian Bach: his work and influence on the music of Germany, 1685–1750, translated by Clara Bell and John Alexander Fuller-Maitland, In Three Volumes, Vol. II. London, Novello & Co, 1884.
