= Die sieben Worte Jesu Christi am Kreuz =

Choral work c. 1645 by Heinrich Schütz

- Cantata by Heinrich Schütz
- English: Historia der Geburt Jesu Christi
- Full title: Die Sieben Worte unsers lieben Erlösers u. Seeligmachers Jesu Christi, so er am Stamm des Hl. Kreuzes gesprochen
- Catalogue: SWV 478
- Occasion: Passiontide
- Text: Hymn by Johann Böschenstein; Biblical Gospel excerpts
- Language: German
- Published: 1645?
- Scoring: five voices; five instruments; continuo

Die sieben Worte Jesu Christi am Kreuz (The seven words of Jesus Christ on the Cross), SWV 478, is a German-language musical setting of the seven sayings of Jesus on the cross by Heinrich Schütz. It was written in Weissenfels around 1645 and revised in 1657. Schütz set the text of the biblical words in their context, framed by two stanzas from Johann Böschenstein's hymn "Da Jesus an dem Kreuze stund", as an oratorio or Passion cantata. He scored it for five voices (SATTB), five instrumental parts and continuo. The original title reads: Die Sieben Worte unsers lieben Erlösers u. Seeligmachers Jesu Christi, so er am Stamm des Hl. Kreuzes gesprochen (The seven words of our dear redeemer and saviour Jesus Christ, which he spoke on the stem of the Holy Cross).

== History ==
Schütz wrote the work in Weissenfels around 1645, and revised it in 1655 to 1657. It was possibly composed for Protestant liturgy, such as the court of Margrave Christian Ernst von Brandenburg-Bayreuth, not the Catholic court in Dresden, or perhaps not for liturgy at all but for private devotion at court. The work was also performed in Leipzig. The oratorio is still in a fairly strict North German form, though more free than his four passion settings. The cover of a manuscript bears a poem which illustrates the meaning of the meditation: "Lebstu der Weltt, so bistu todt/ und kränckst Christum mit schmertzen / Stirbst' aber in seinen Wunden roth / So lebt er in deim Hertzen." (Lovest thou the World, then art thou dead, and the Lord must bear the Hurt / But dost thou die red in his Wounds, Then he liveth in thy Heart.)

== Text ==
The work is in three sections, with a central text body compiled from the four Gospels in the Luther Bible, with emphasis on the Seven Words. The preceding Introitus and closing Conclusio are the first and last stanzas of the hymn "Da Jesus an dem Kreuze stund", written by Johann Böschenstein (1472–1539). The hymn already contains a reflection on the Seven Words. In the following text and translation, the intervening text of the Evangelists, also set to be sung, is not shown.

German

Introitus
Da Jesus an dem Kreuze stund,
und ihm sein Leichnam war verwundt
sogar mit bittern Schmerzen,
die sieben Worte, die Jesus sprach,
betracht in deinem Herzen.

Die Sieben Worte
1. Wort: Vater vergib ihnen, denn sie wissen nicht, was sie tun.
2. Wort: Weib, siehe das ist dein Sohn! Johannes, siehe das ist deine Mutter!
3. Wort: Wahrlich, ich sage dir, heute wirst du mit mir im Paradies sein.
4. Wort: Eli lama asabathani; Mein Gott, warum hast du mich verlassen.
5. Wort: Mich dürstet.
6. Wort: Es ist vollbracht.
7. Wort: Vater ich befehle meinen Geist in deine Hände.

Conclusio
Wer Gottes Marter in Ehren hat
und oft gedenkt der sieben Wort,
der will Gott gar eben pflegen,
wohl hie auf Erd mit seiner Gnad,
und dort in dem ewigen Leben.

English

Introduction
When Jesus was at the cross
covered with wounds
in bitter sorrows,
The seven words he spoke,
muse them, in your heart.

The Seven Words
1st Word: Father, forgive them, because they do not know what they do!
2nd Word: Woman, behold your son! John, behold your mother!
3rd Word: In truth, I tell you: today you'll be in Heaven with me.
4th Word: Eli, Eli, lama asabthani? My God, my God, why have you forsaken me?
5th Word: I am thirsty!
6th Word: All is finished.
7th Word: Father, I commend my spirit into your hands!

Conclusion
Those who honour the martyred God
and often muse the seven words,
God will certainly take care of,
here on earth, with grace,
and there, in everlasting life.

== Music ==
Schütz set the text as an oratorio, or cantata for Passiontide, for five voices (SATTB), five instrumental parts and continuo. The two framing hymn stanzas are set as motets for five parts, not using the traditional hymn tune. The two sinfonias are identical. In the narrative central part, the Evangelist's words are set for one to four voices, SATB, while the second tenor is the vox Christi, the voice of Christ. According to an early manuscript, the instruments play only in the sinfonia and with the vox Christi, while the introduction, Evangelist and conclusion are accompanied only by the continuo. The instruments are not specified, and can be a choir of viols, or strings, or woodwind instruments. The two groups of performers can be placed apart in performance.

The narrative and the dialogue, in which the Seven Words appear, are composed like contemporary operatic recitative in a style that Schütz had learned in Venice. The sinfonia is one of few surviving instrumental works by Schütz.

The work is a precursor of his Passions. The treatment of the vox Christi with obbligato instruments was used by Bach in his St Matthew Passion. The music for the dialogues is rhetoric, following the text.

== Recordings ==
The work was first recorded in 1966 by Archiv: Peter Schreier and Theo Adam soloed with the Dresdner Kreuzchor under Rudolf Mauersberger. It was again recorded for Naxos in 2001 along with other sacred music by Schütz, conducted by Wolfgang Helbich. A reviewer described the work as a "distinctive and expansive score", and noted: "The depth of feeling offered by the principals is exceptional, with significant dramatic expression combined with conviction and appropriate reverence." The Dresdner Kammerchor recorded the work, along with Passions by Schütz, with soloists and a viol choir conducted by Hans-Christoph Rademann in 2012. A reviewer noted that the work was the highlight of the collection, with fine performances by the singers and expressive instrumental playing.
