= Lobet Gott in seinen Reichen, BWV 11 =

Oratorio by Johann Sebastian Bach (1729)

Lobet Gott in seinen Reichen; Ascension Oratorio
- BWV 11
- Oratorio by J. S. Bach
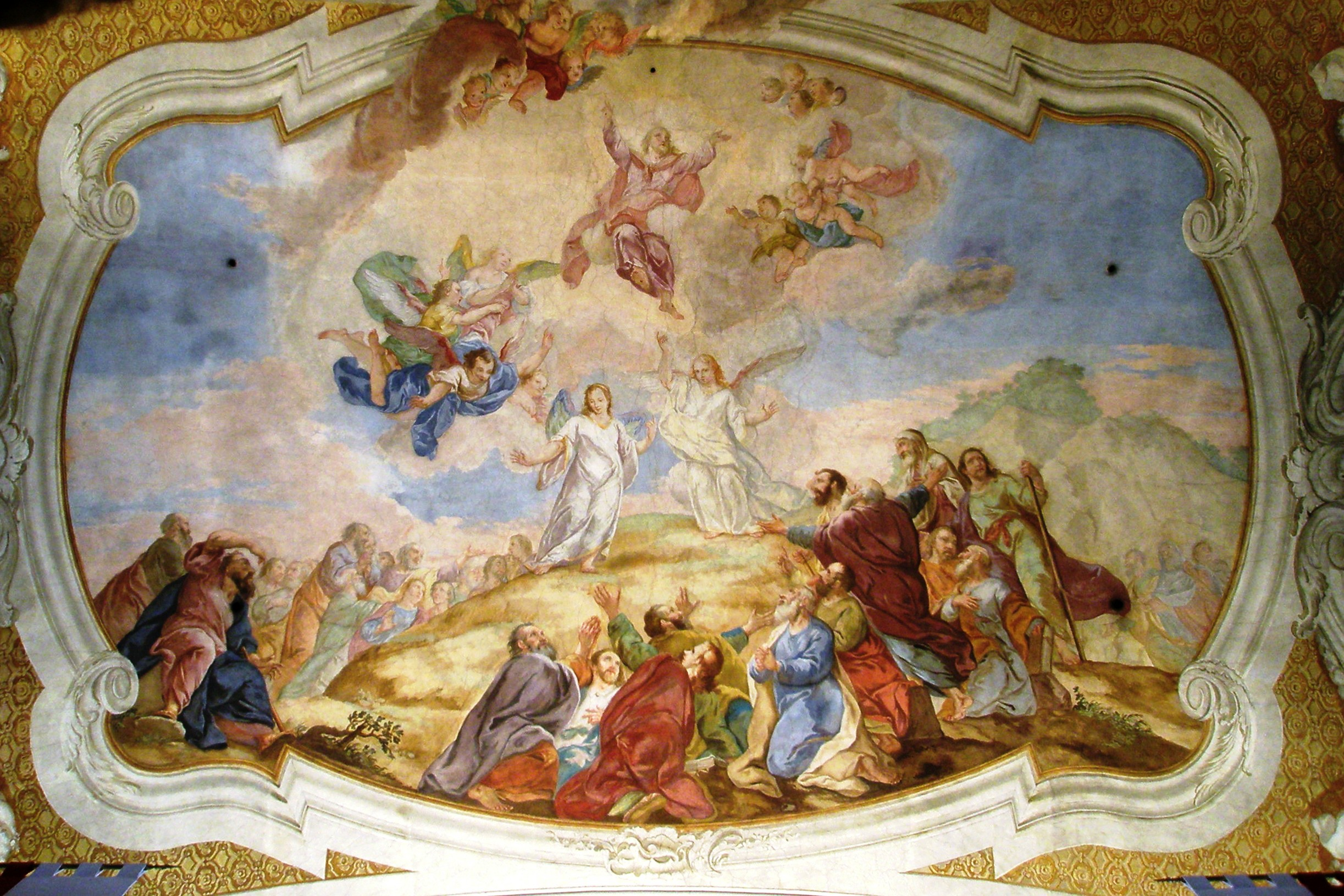
- Ascension, Church of the Holy Cross in Jelenia Góra
- Native name: Oratorium In Festo Ascensionis
- Related: Agnus Dei
- Occasion: Feast of the Ascension
- Cantata text: Picander?
- Bible text: Luke, Acts, Mark: Luke 24:50–51; Acts 1:9; Mark 16:19; Acts 1:10–11; Luke 24:52; Acts 1:12
- Chorale: by Johann Rist; by Gottfried Wilhelm Sacer
- Performed: 15 May 1738?: Leipzig
- Movements: 11 in two parts (6 + 5)
- Vocal: SATB soloists and choir
- Instrumental: 3 trumpets; timpani; 2 flauti traversi; 2 oboes; 2 violins; viola; continuo

Lobet Gott in seinen Reichen (Praise God in all his kingdoms), BWV 11, (Note: "BWV" is Bach-Werke-Verzeichnis, a thematic catalogue of Bach's works.) known as the Ascension Oratorio (Himmelfahrtsoratorium), is an oratorio by Johann Sebastian Bach, marked by him as Oratorium In Festo Ascensionis Xsti (Oratorio for the feast of the Ascension of Christ), composed for the service for Ascension and probably first performed on 15 May 1738.

Bach had composed his Christmas Oratorio, based on the gospels of Luke and Matthew, in 1734. He had composed an Easter Oratorio already in 1725. The text for the Ascension Oratorio, a compilation of several biblical sources, free poetry and chorales, was presumably written by Picander who may also have worked on the libretto for the Christmas Oratorio. It follows the story of the Ascension as told in Luke, Mark and the Acts of the Apostles. The oratorio is structured in eleven movements in two parts, taking about half an hour to perform. It is framed by extended choral movements, Part I is concluded by the fourth stanza of Johann Rist's hymn "Du Lebensfürst, Herr Jesu Christ" in a four-part setting. The closing chorale on the seventh stanza of Gottfried Wilhelm Sacer's "Gott fähret auf gen Himmel" is set as a chorale fantasia. The work is richly scored for the feast day, exactly like the Christmas Oratorio for four vocal parts, three trumpets, timpani, two flauti traversi, two oboes, strings and continuo.

== History ==
Bach had composed his Christmas Oratorio, based on the gospels of Luke and Matthew, in 1734, a work in six parts to be performed on six occasions during Christmastide. He had composed an Easter Oratorio already in 1725, and revised it for 1738. Bach composed the oratorio for Ascension that same year. The text for the Ascension Oratorio, a compilation of several biblical sources, free poetry and chorales, was presumably written by Picander who had been the librettist for the St Matthew Passion and other works by Bach. It follows the story of the Ascension as told both in Luke, Mark and the Acts of the Apostles.

The bible narration is compiled from multiple sources: the first recitative of the Evangelist (movement 2) is from Luke 24 (Luke 24:50–51), the second (5) from Acts 1 (Acts 1:9) and Mark 16 (Mark 16:19), the third (7) from Acts 1 (Acts 1:10–11), the last (9) from Luke 24 (Luke 24:52a), Acts 1 (Acts 1:12), and Luke 24 (Luke 24:52b). The biblical words are narrated by the tenor as the Evangelist. In his third recitative two men are quoted, for this quotation tenor and bass both sing in an arioso.

Part I, which tells of the Ascension, is concluded by the fourth stanza of Johann Rist's hymn "Du Lebensfürst, Herr Jesu Christ" in a four-part setting. Part II reflects the reaction of the disciples. The closing chorale on the seventh stanza of Gottfried Wilhelm Sacer's "Gott fähret auf gen Himmel" is set as a chorale fantasia. While the music for the narration and the first chorale were new compositions in 1738, Bach based the framing choral movements and the two arias on earlier compositions. He used the model for the alto aria again much later for the Agnus Dei of his Mass in B minor.

Bach probably performed the oratorio first on 15 May 1738, while an older reference states that it was composed in 1735, in the same liturgical year as the Christmas Oratorio.

In the first complete edition of Bach's works, the Bach-Ausgabe of the Bach Gesellschaft, the work was included under the cantatas (hence its low BWV number), and in the Bach Compendium it is numbered BC D 9 and included under oratorios.

== Music ==
=== Scoring and structure ===
The oratorio spans eleven movements in two parts to be performed before and after the sermon, 1–6 before the sermon and 7–11 after the sermon. It takes about half an hour to perform. The title on the first page of the autograph reads:

"J.J. Oratorium Festo Ascensionis Xsti. à 4 Voci. 3 Trombe Tamburi
2 Travers. 2 Hautb. 2 Violini, Viola e Cont. di
Bach

"J.J." is short for "Jesu juva" (Jesus, help), a formula which Bach and others often wrote at the beginning of a sacred piece. The title in Latin translates to "Oratorio for the feast of the Ascension of Christ", and the scoring in a mixture of French and Italian names the parts and instruments as four vocal parts, three trumpets (Tr), timpani, two flauti traversi (Ft), two oboes (Ob), two violins (Vn), viola (Va) and basso continuo (Bc) by Bach. The voices are soprano, alto, tenor and bass, forming a four-part choir (SATB). The work is festively scored, exactly like the Christmas Oratorio.

The structure shows symmetry around the central chorale. Expansive chorale movements using the complete orchestra frame the work. Both parts contain besides the bible narration (rec.) a reflective accompagnato recitative (acc.) and an aria with obbligato instruments. In the following table of the movements, the scoring is taken the Neue Bach-Ausgabe. The keys and time signatures are taken from Alfred Dürr, using the symbol for common time (4/4). Dürr gives the duration as 32 minutes. The timpani always play with the trumpets and are not mentioned.

No.	Type	Text (source)	Vocal	Brass and winds	Strings	Bass	Key	Time
Part I
1	chorus	Lobet Gott in seinen Reichen (Picander)	SATB	3Tr 2Ft 2Ob	2Vl Va	Bc	D major	2/4
2	rec.	Der Herr Jesus hub seine Hände auf (Bible)	T			Bc		common time
3	acc.	Ach, Jesu, ist dein Abschied (Picander)	B	2Ft		Bc		common time
4	aria	Ach, bleibe doch, mein liebstes Leben (Picander)	A		Vl (unis.)	Bc	A minor	common time
5	rec.	Und ward aufgehoben zusehends (Bible)	T			Bc		common time
6	chorale	Nun lieget alles unter dir (Rist)	SATB	2Ft 2Ob	2Vl Va	Bc	D major	3/4
Part II
7	rec.	Und da sie ihm nachsahen (Bible)	T B			Bc		common time
8	acc.	Ach ja! so komme bald zurück (Picander)	A	2Ft		Bc		common time
9	rec.	Sie aber beteten ihn an (Bible)	T			Bc		common time
10	aria	Jesu, deine Gnadenblicke (Bible)	S	2Ft Ob	unison		G major	3/8
11	chorale	Wenn soll es doch geschehen (Sacer)	SATB	3Tr 2Ft 2Ob	2Vl Va	Bc	D major	6/4

=== Movements ===
The Bach scholar Richard D. P. Jones compares the Christmas Oratorio and the Ascension Oratorio and arrives at similarities:

the festive opening chorus with trumpets and drums, the Evangelist's secco recitatives, the intermediate four-part chorale, the meditative accompagnati, the semi-dramatic treatment of biblical characters (here the "two men in white") and the elaborate chorale-finale.

The oratorio is similar especially to Part VI of the Christmas Oratorio which also begins with an extended opening chorus and a chorale fantasia as a conclusion. Bach derived the opening chorus and two arias of earlier works.

==== 1 ====
The festive opening chorus expressing praise, "Lobet Gott in seinen Reichen", is believed to be based on a movement from the lost secular cantata Froher Tag, verlangte Stunden, BWV Anh. 18. The movement has no fugue, but dance-like elements and Lombard rhythm. The orchestra with trumpets, flutes and oboes, begins with extended concertante music. The choir enters in homophony, with its own themes. Two middle sections, similar to each other, have syncopated themes in minor modes, but the general praise prevails there as well.

==== 2 ====
Bach marks the first recitative of bible narration "Recit. nach dem ersten Chor" (Recitative after the first chorus). It is sung by the Evangelista (Evangelist), which Bach assigns to the tenor singing secco recitative, following an old tradition. The action begins, "Der Herr Jesus hub seine Hände auf" (The Lord Jesus lifted up His hands), with Jesus blessing the disciples and leaving them.

==== 3 ====
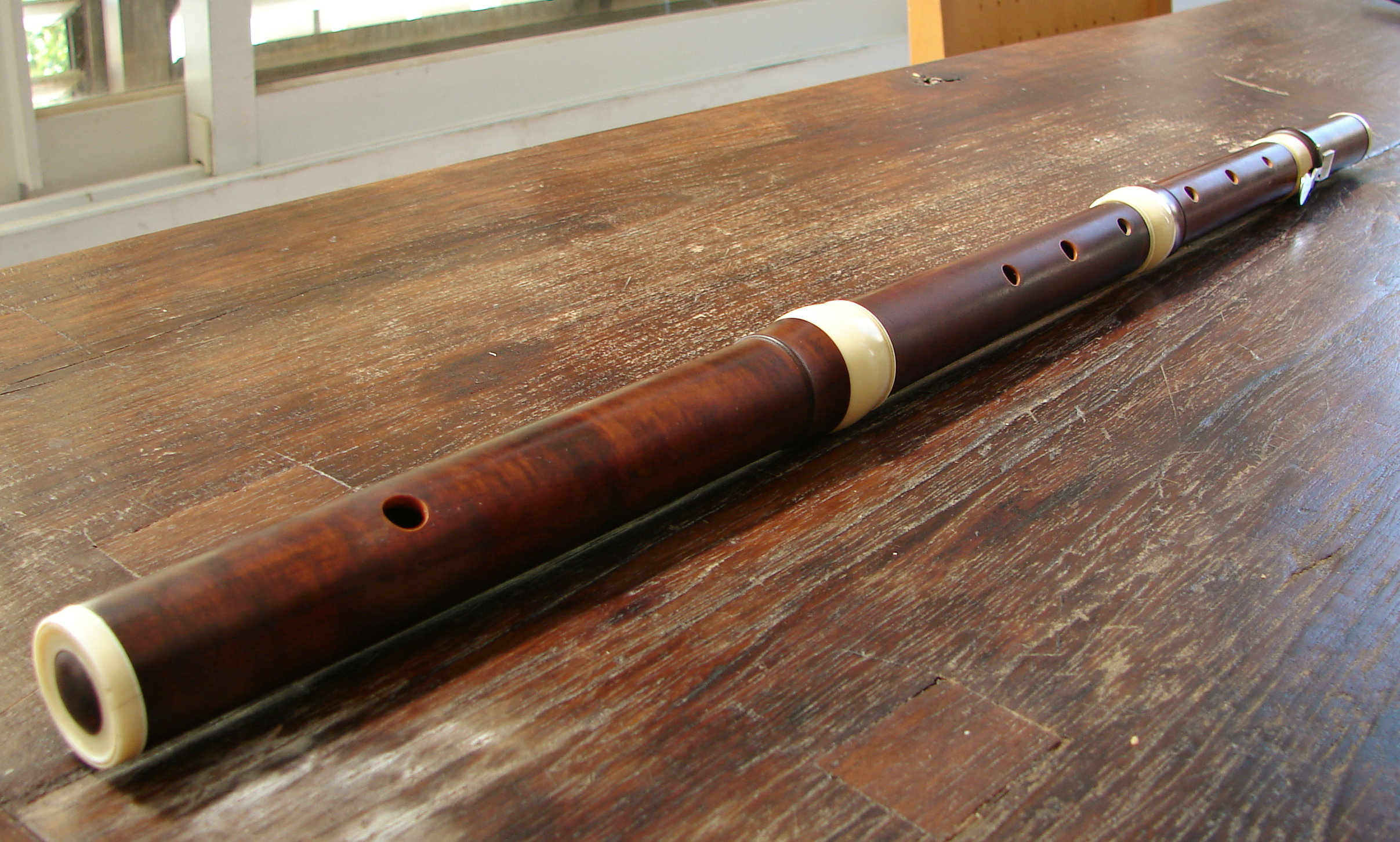
Traverso by Boaz Berney, after an original by Thomas Lot, Paris ca. 1740

A reflecting recitative for bass, "Ach, Jesu, ist dein Abschied" (Ah, Jesus, is Your departure), shows the situation of the disciples afraid that Jesus will leave them soon. Marked "Rec: col accomp." (Recitative: with accomp[animent]), it is accompanied by the flutes and continuo as a recitativo accompagnato. The instruments add colour in long notes to the singing, and illustrate feelings and movements in transitions.

==== 4 ====
Deeper reflection is expressed in an aria, marked "Aria Violini unisoni e Alto" (Aria Violins in unison and Alto). The singer requests Jesus to stay: "Ach, bleibe doch, mein liebstes Leben" (Ah, just stay, my dearest Life). The music is based on a movement from the lost wedding cantata Auf, süß entzückende Gewalt, BWV Anh. 196, written in 1725 on a libretto by Johann Christoph Gottsched.

Bach used the model for the alto aria of the Agnus Dei of his Mass in B minor.

==== 5 ====
The Evangelist continues the narration with the Ascension: "Und ward aufgehoben zusehends" (And He was apparently lifted up).

==== 6 ====
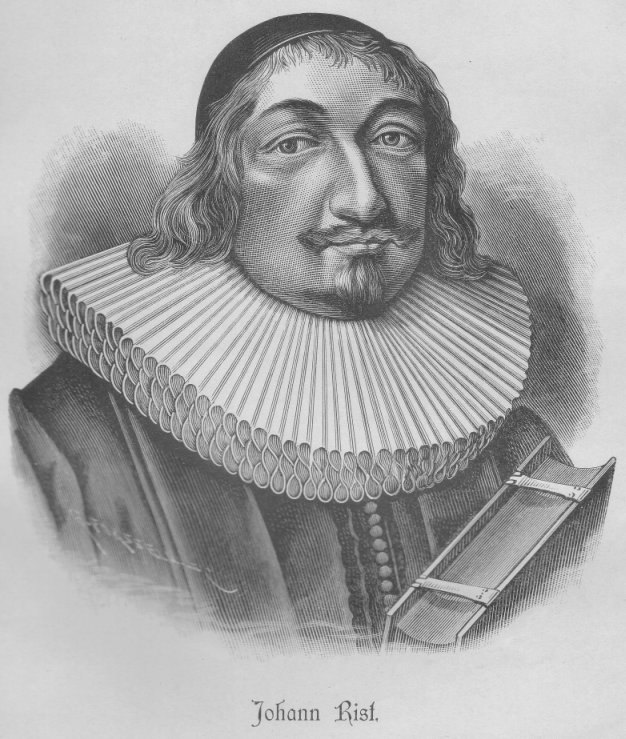
Johann Rist, the writer of the hymn lyrics

The first chorale, closing part 1, is the fourth stanza of "Du Lebensfürst, Herr Jesu Christ", written in 1641 by Johann Rist. The text "Nun lieget alles unter dir" (Now everything is subject to You) imagines Jesus in heaven, with the angels and elements serving him:

Nun lieget alles unter dir,
Dich selbst nur ausgenommen;
Die Engel müssen für und für
Dir aufzuwarten kommen.
Dir Fürsten stehn auch auf der Bahn
Und sind dir willig untertan;
Luft, Wasser, Feuer, Erden
Muß dir zu Dienste werden.

It is composed as a four-part setting, with the instruments playing colla parte: oboes and violin I enforce the chorale tune, the flutes an octave higher, violin II plays with the alto, viola with the tenor, and the continuo with the bass.

==== 7 ====
The evangelist begins Part II, "Und da sie ihm nachsahen" (And as they watched), telling of two men in white gowns addressing the disciples. The two men are represented by tenor and bass in a duet, which begins in homophony and leads to a canon.

==== 8 ====
A reflecting recitative for alto, "Ach ja! so komme bald zurück" (Ah yes! Then come back soon), requests the return of Jesus. Parallel to the bass recitative in Part I, it is also accompanied by the flutes and continuo.

==== 9 ====
The evangelist ends the narration, "Sie aber beteten ihn an" (They however prayed to Him), telling of the disciples' return from the mountain which is named the Mount of Olives.

==== 10 ====
The soprano aria, "Jesu, deine Gnadenblicke" (Jesus, Your merciful gaze), is also based on the wedding cantata Auf, süß entzückende Gewalt. It is one of the rare pieces in Bach's music without basso continuo, with the two unison flutes, the oboe and the unison strings playing a trio, augmented to a quartet by the singer. The original words in the wedding cantata mentioned "Unschuld" (innocence). Brian Robins notes "the lightly translucent texture reflecting the text's allusion to Christ leaving his body to ascend to Heaven". While Dürr saw the music as the illustrtion of a glance towards heaven, Jones thinks that the setting without an earthly continuo represents the Gnadenblicke (glances of Grace) of the text.

==== 11 ====
The closing chorale, "Wenn soll es doch geschehen" (When shall it happen"), is the seventh stanza of "Gott fähret auf gen Himmel", written in 1697 by Gottfried Wilhelm Sacer. Set in the first person, it expresses the desire of the speaker for the "liebe Zeit" (dear time) when he sees the Saviour in his glory. Continuing saying "wir" (we), he imagines greeting and kissing him.

Wenn soll es doch geschehen,
wenn kömmt die liebe Zeit,
daß ich ihn werde sehn
in seiner Herrlichkeit?
Du Tag, wenn wirst du sein,
daß wir den Heiland grüßen,
daß wir den Heiland küssen?
Komm, stelle dich doch ein!

It is set as a chorale fantasia. The soprano sings the cantus firmus in long notes,< on the melody of "Von Gott will ich nicht lassen". Similar to the final chorale Nun seid ihr wohl gerochen of the Christmas Oratorio, the chorale tune in a church mode appears in the triumphant context of a different major key. The text expresses longing for the day of being united with Jesus in Heaven. The musicologist Julian Mincham interprets the mode of the tune as "the human state of waiting and hoping", while the concerto represents the fulfillment. Mincham compares the writing to the opening chorale fantasias of the second cantata cycle of chorale cantatas, finding the composition for the lower voices "endlessly inventive, frequently related to the textual images" pointing out "the passionate and clinging representation of kissing the Saviour beneath the caressing flutes, in the penultimate phrase".

== Recordings ==
The sortable listing is taken from the selection provided by Aryeh Oron on the Bach Cantatas Website. Ensembles with period instruments in historically informed performance and choirs of one voice per part (OVPP) is marked by green background.

Recordings of Lobet Gott in seinen Reichen
Title	Conductor / Choir / Orchestra	Soloists	Label	Year	Choir type	Orch. type
Historic Bach cantatas (Karl Straube, 1931)	Karl Straube Thomanerchor Gewandhausorchester	Anni Quistorp; Frieda Dierolf; Hans Schubert-Meister; Karl August Neumann	Querstand	1931		
Bach: Cantatas No. 67 & 11, from cantata No. 147	Reginald Jacques The Cantata Singers The Jacques Orchestra	Ena Mitchell; Kathleen Ferrier; William Herbert; William Parsons	Decca	1949		
J. S. Bach: Cantata BWV 11	Marcel Couraud Stuttgarter Bach-Chor Badische Staatskapelle	soloist of the Knabenchor Hannover; Rosl Schwaiger; Gisela Litz; Theo Altmeyer; Franz Crass		mid 1950s?		
Bach Made in Germany Vol. 2 – Cantatas I	Kurt Thomas Thomanerchor Gewandhausorchester	soloist of the Knabenchor Hannover; Elisabeth Grümmer; Marga Höffgen; Hans-Joachim Rotzsch; Theo Adam	Bach Archiv Leipzig	1960		
Les Grandes Cantates de J. S. Bach Vol. 2	Fritz Werner Heinrich-Schütz-Chor Heilbronn Pforzheim Chamber Orchestra	Hedy Graf; Barbara Scherler; Kurt Huber; Jakob Stämpfli	Erato	1966		
J. S. Bach: Das Kantatenwerk • Complete Cantatas • Les Cantates, Folge / Vol. 3	Nikolaus Harnoncourt: Wiener Sängerknaben; Chorus Viennensis; Leonhardt-Consort	soloist of the Wiener Sängerknaben; Paul Esswood; Kurt Equiluz; Max van Egmond	Teldec	1972		Period
Bach Cantatas Vol. 3 – Ascension Day, Whitsun, Trinity	Karl Richter Münchener Bach-Chor Münchener Bach-Orchester	Edith Mathis; Anna Reynolds; Peter Schreier; Dietrich Fischer-Dieskau	Archiv Produktion	1975		
Die Bach Kantate Vol. 7	Helmuth Rilling Gächinger Kantorei Württembergisches Kammerorchester Heilbronn	Costanza Cuccaro; Mechthild Georg; Adalbert Kraus; Andreas Schmidt	Hänssler	1984		
J. S. Bach: Cantatas BWV 11 & 249	Gustav Leonhardt Choir of the Age of Enlightenment Orchestra of the Age of Enlightenment	Monika Frimmer; Ralf Popken; Christoph Prégardien; David Wilson-Johnson	Philips	1993		Period
J. S. Bach: Himmelfahrts-Oratorium	Philippe Herreweghe Choir of the Age of Enlightenment Orchestra of the Age of Enlightenment	Barbara Schlick; Catherine Patriasz; Christoph Prégardien; Peter Kooy	Harmonia Mundi	1993		Period
J. S. Bach: Ascension Cantatas	John Eliot Gardiner Monteverdi Choir English Baroque Soloists	Nancy Argenta; Michael Chance; Anthony Rolfe Johnson; Stephen Varcoe	Archiv Produktion	2000		Period
Bach Edition Vol. 17 – Cantatas Vol. 2	Pieter Jan Leusink Holland Boys Choir Netherlands Bach Collegium	Marjon Strijk; Sytse Buwalda; Knut Schoch; Bas Ramselaar	Brilliant Classics	2000		Period
J. S. Bach: Complete Cantatas Vol. 20	Ton Koopman Amsterdam Baroque Orchestra & Choir	Sandrine Piau; Bogna Bartosz; James Gilchrist; Klaus Mertens	Antoine Marchand	2003		Period
J. S. Bach: Easter Oratorio · Ascension Oratorio	Masaaki Suzuki Bach Collegium Japan	Yukari Nonoshita; Patrick Van Goethem; Jan Kobow; Chiyuki Urano	BIS	2004		Period
J. S. Bach: Cantatas for the Complete Liturgical Year Vol. 10	Sigiswald Kuijken La Petite Bande	Siri Thornhill; Petra Noskaiová; Christoph Genz; Jan van der Crabben	Accent	2009	OVPP	Period
