= De arte canendi =

Book by Sebald Heyden

De arte canendi is an important musical treatise by Sebald Heyden, produced in three installments between 1532 and 1540. The first installment was produced in 1532 in 26 pages, the second in 1537 grew to 115 pages and the third in 1540 to 163 pages. The third and final edition completed in Nuremberg in 1540, is said to have "had a greater impact on modern scholarship than any other writing on mensuration and tactus from the 15th or 16th century." A collection of secular songs, it has been described as a "treatise on singing technique aimed at the growing number of amateur musicians who wished to improve their skills." In the third installment, Heyden confessed to being an admirer of Josquin des Prez and his contemporaries, transcribing Josquin's Missa L'homme armé sexti toni (Benedictus), amongst others. Notably, Heyden is said to have "adopted a horror fusae position at a time when Italian musicians were writing pieces a note nere under the signature of C." Indeed, the treatise is said to have "influenced many twentieth-century scholars to believe that the tactus of the sixteenth century represented an unvarying beat."
