= Jesu, meines Glaubens Zier =

- Other name: It is finished! Christ hath known
- Genre: Passion hymn
- Text: by Gottfried Wilhelm Sacer
- Language: German
- Meter: 78.87.87.87
- Melody: Anonymous (1714)
- Published: text: 1661; melody: 1714

Jesu, meines Glaubens Zier is a German Lutheran hymn by Gottfried Wilhelm Sacer, first published in 1661. Its hymn tune, Zahn No. 6453, was first published in 1714, in Freylinghausen's hymnal. In 1736 the hymn was adopted in Schemellis Gesangbuch, with a figured bass accompaniment which may have been contributed by Johann Sebastian Bach (BWV 472).

The tune is also known in English due to its presence in the 1906 English Hymnal and its 1986 successor, where it appears to "It is finished! Christ hath known", a Passion text by Gabriel Gillett written for the 1906 publication and based on Jesus' dying words, per the Gospel of John, "tetelestai" ("It is finished!"), (Note: See John 19:30.) which inspired many other hymns.

== Text ==
The original German text is a Passion hymn in five stanzas of eight lines each. An English-language version of the hymn, not a translation of the original but sharing its rhyme scheme and Passion theme, has three stanzas. The author of that version, who exemplifies the conservative tradition of the beginning of the 20th-century, pleads, in a "very sensitive and beautiful text", for Christ, as maker of human joys and sorrows, to lead his flock upon the same path of self-sacrifice. The poet's tone and theology are medieval in nature, the text as a whole expanding on medieval analogies between Nature and Christian mythology.

== Tune ==
The hymn tune of "Jesu, meines Glaubens Zier" was first published in Freylinghausen's hymnal in 1714. The setting which appears in Schemellis Gesangbuch only consists of a vocal line (melody) and a figured bass. A realisation of this was published in the English Hymnal, and this setting is transcribed below.

== Sources ==
- "Jesu, meines Glaubens Zier (sacred song) BWV 472". Bach Digital. Leipzig: Bach Archive; et al. 2019-03-11.
- Adey, Lionel (1986). Hymns and the Christian Myth (digital ed.). UBC Press (published 1 November 2011). ISBN 9780774844901.
- Lyon, James (2005). Johann Sebastian Bach: Chorals. Guides musicologiques (in French). Vol. 6. Beauchesne. ISBN 270101493X. ISSN 0246-3865.
- Routley, Erik (1979). An English-Speaking Hymnal Guide. Liturgical Press. ISBN 978-0-8146-1015-2.
- Zahn, Johannes (1891). Die Melodien der deutschen evangelischen Kirchenlieder (in German). Gütersloh: Bertelsmann. Volume IV
