= O Mensch, bewein dein Sünde groß =

Lutheran Passion hymn

- Lutheran Passion hymn
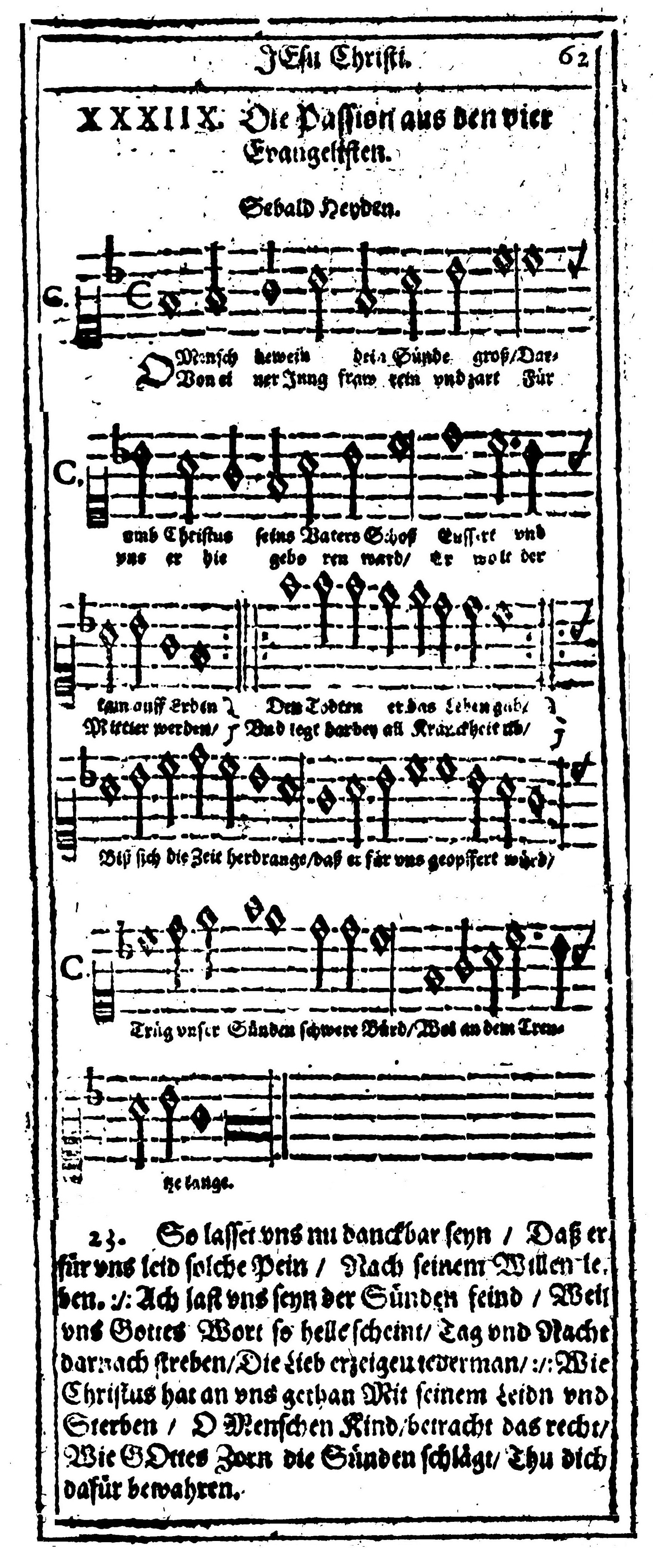
- The Passion hymn's melody and first and last stanza in Johann Hermann Schein's Cantional (1645)
- English: O man, bewail thy sins so great; O man, thy grievous sin bemoan
- Written: 1530
- Text: by Sebald Heyden
- Language: German
- Meter: 8.8.7.8.8.7.8.8.7.8.8.7.

"O Mensch, bewein' dein' Sünde groß" (O man, bewail thy sin so great) is a Lutheran Passion hymn with a text written by Sebald Heyden in 1530. The author reflects the Passion of Jesus, based on the Four Evangelists, originally in 23 stanzas. The lyrics were written for an older melody, "Es sind doch selig alle, die im rechten Glauben wandeln" (Zahn No. 8303). The first and last stanzas have appeared in 11 hymnals. Catherine Winkworth translated it as "O man, thy grievous sin bemoan". The hymn has been used in Passion music and is known in Bach's setting as a chorale fantasia closing Part I of his St Matthew Passion.

== Hymn ==
Sebald originally wrote a reflection of the Passion of Jesus based on the four gospels in 23 stanzas of 12 lines each. The original title begins "Der Passion auß den vier Evangelisten" (The Passion from the Four Evangelists). It reflects the Passion, narrating the Stations of the Cross and adding the context of Heilsbedeutung (meaning for salvation), beginning with man's sinful condition and ending with thanks.

O Mensch, bewein dein Sünde groß,
Darum Christus seins Vaters Schoß
Äußert und kam auf Erden;
Von einer Jungfrau rein und zart
Für uns er hier geboren ward,
Er wollt der Mittler werden,
Den Toten er das Leben gab
Und legt dabei all Krankheit ab
Bis sich die Zeit herdrange,
Daß er für uns geopfert würd,
Trüg unser Sünden schwere Bürd
Wohl an dem Kreuze lange.

The first stanza opens addressing the listener "O Mensch" (O human being) and requesting him to remember and deplore his great sin (Sünde groß). The following lines state that Jesus Christ left his Father's bosom, came to Earth (kam auf Erden), born of a virgin for us (für uns), wanting to become a mediator (Mittler). The second half of the stanza mentions that he gave life to the dead and removed all sickness (all Krankheit), until it became urgent that he was sacrificed for us, carrying the heavy load of our sins (unsrer Sünden schwere Bürd), long on the cross.

The melody goes back to Matthäus Greiter, around 1524, and appears in Strasbourg hymnals of 1525 and 1526 titled "Beati immaculati.Psalm 119".

Current hymnals contain only the first and last stanzas.

== Musical settings ==
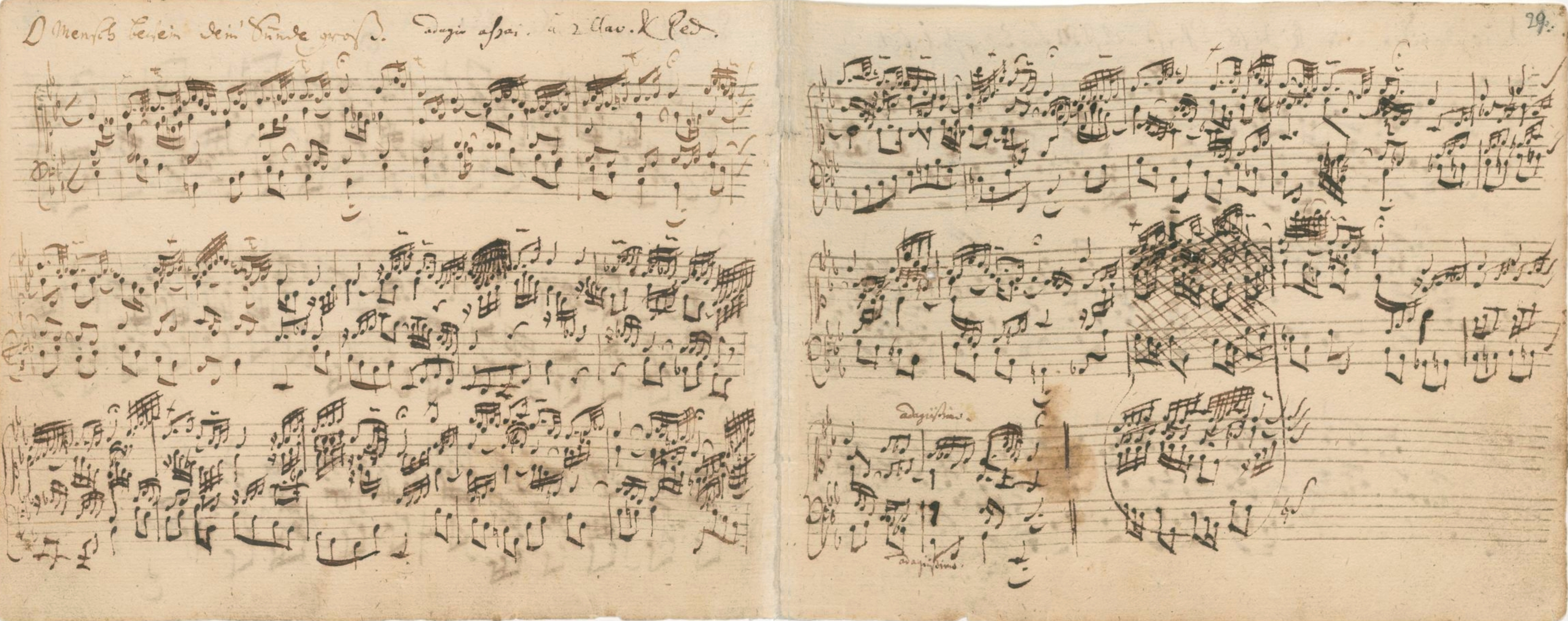
Autograph manuscript of O Mensch, bewein dein Sünde groß, BWV 622

The organ chorale prelude BWV 622 by Johann Sebastian Bach from the Orgelbüchlein has remained one of his most celebrated. In the second version of his St John Passion, Bach began the work with a chorale fantasia on the first stanza of the hymn, which he later modified to conclude Part I of his St Matthew Passion as movement 29.

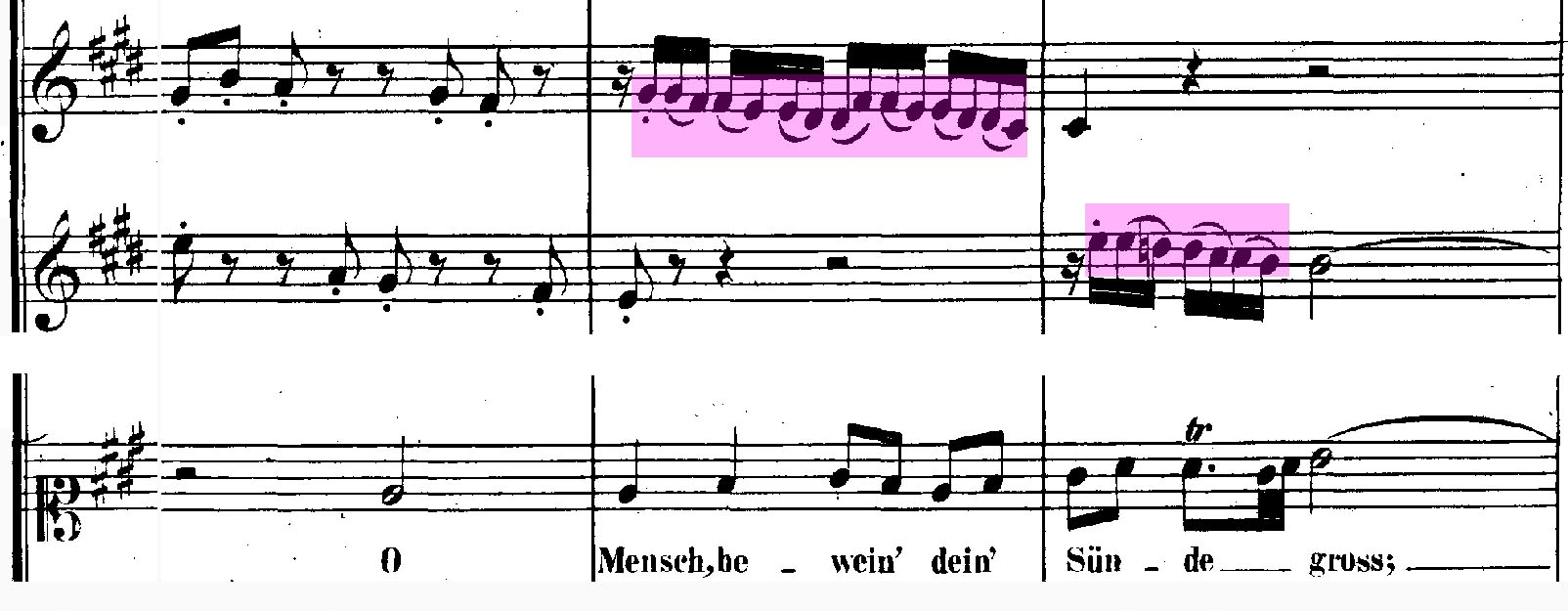
Incipit in Bach's chorale fantasia

Mauricio Kagel quoted the hymn in his oratorio Sankt-Bach-Passion telling Bach's life, composed for the tricentenary of Bach's birth in 1985.

== Translation ==
Catherine Winkworth translated the hymn to "O man, thy grievous sin bemoan".
