= Der am Kreuz ist meine Liebe =

Passion hymn

- Passion hymn
- Written: 1758
- Text: by Friedrich Gottlieb Klopstock
- Language: German
- Melody: "Freue dich, du meine Seele"
- Composed: 1551

"Der am Kreuz ist meine Liebe" (He on the Cross is my love) is the beginning of Passion hymns in German. One version was written by Johann Mentzer as a translation of the Latin "Amor meus crucifixus est" (My love was crucified), attributed to Ignatius of Antioch from the Epistle of Ignatius to the Romans, to the melody of "Werde munter, mein Gemüte". A famous version was written by Friedrich Gottlieb Klopstock, in six stanzas, and first published in 1758. It was associated with the melody used first for "Freue dich, du meine Seele".

Several poems and hymns use Klopstock's beginning and format, including a 1974 version in three stanzas by Lothar Zenetti which is contained in regional sections of the German Catholic hymnal Gotteslob.

== History ==
All poems begin with a declaration of love for the crucified Jesus:

German

Der am Kreuz ist meine Liebe,
Meine Lieb ist Jesus Christ.

English

He on the Cross is my love,
My love is Jesus Christ.

The stanzas have eight lines each. The rhyme scheme is ABABCCAA, with the A lines of 8 syllables, the others 7 syllables.

=== Mentzer ===
Johann Mentzer wrote "Der am Kreuz ist meine Liebe", a poem in six stanzas, as a translation of the Latin "Amor meus crucifixus est" (My love was crucified), attributed to Ignatius of Antioch. It was assigned to the melody of "Werde munter, mein Gemüte". This version appears in Zahn's catalogue as anonymous, Zahn No. 6639. It was also attributed to Ahasverus Fritzsch. The last two lines are the same in all six stanzas; the seventh line repeats the first, and the rhyming eighth line says "weil ich mich im Glauben übe" (because I practice the faith).

=== Greding ===
A poem in the 1740 hymnal Erquickstunden in dem Heiligthum Gottes from Stuttgart, began: "Der am Creutz ist meine Liebe, und sonst nichts in dieser Welt" (He on the Cross is my love, and nothing else in the world), and ends "Es sey heiter oder trübe, der am Creutz ist meine Liebe" (Be it fair or dull, He on the Cross is my love). In this version, the name of Jesus is not mentioned. This poem has been attributed to J. E. Greding.

=== Klopstock ===
Klopstock wrote "Der am Kreuz ist meine Liebe" as a poem in six stanzas in the same format as Mentzer. He retained the first two lines, but worded the conclusion differently: "Meine Lieb ist der Erwürgte, der für mich beym Richter bürgte" (My love is the strangled one, who vouched for me before the judge). He repeated this ending for the second stanza, but saying "on the Cross" instead of "before the judge". In the following stanza, he varied the ending, with "Den ich dann nicht mehr betrübe. Du bist ewig meine Liebe." (Whom I then no longer sadden. You are my love forever.) in the final stanza.

The poem was first published in 1758 in the collection Geistliche Lieder (Spiritual Songs) in Copenhagen and Leipzig. It appeared in further editions until 1809. In the 1809 edition, as volume 7 of his works, it had six revised stanzas. The melody was taken from the Genevan Psalter where it appeared in 1551.

=== Zenetti ===
In 1974, Lothar Zenetti wrote a version in three stanzas in the format, using the same first two lines for all three stanzas, and paraphrasing the end of Klopstock's sixth stanza for the last two lines of his first stanza. It is contained in regional sections of the German Catholic hymnal Gotteslob, in the Diocese of Limburg, as GL 774. In the Trier section, the same version is GL 773.
