= Da Jesus an dem Kreuze stund =

German Lutheran hymn

- Lutheran Passion hymn
- English: When Jesus stood by the Cross
- Text: by Johann Böschenstein
- Language: German
- Melody: from Genevan Psalter
- Published: 1537
- MIDI rendition

"Da Jesus an dem Kreuze stund" (When Jesus stood by the Cross) is a Lutheran Passion hymn in German by Johann Böschenstein (1472–1540), which contains seven stanzas related to seven sayings of Jesus on the cross, framed by a stanza to introduce them, and one to conclude the meditation. It appeared in 1537. The hymn tune is Zahn 1706.

BWV 621 from Orgelbüchlein

The hymn was often set to music, especially for Passiontide. Heinrich Schütz used the outer stanzas to frame his dramatic setting of the same sayings of Jesus, Die sieben Worte Jesu Christi am Kreuz. Johann Sebastian Bach set the hymn as an organ chorale prelude (BWV 621) as part of the Orgelbüchlein.

== Cited sources ==
- Messori, Matteo. "Heinrich Schütz Edition / Sacred Choral Works" (PDF). Brilliant Classics.
- "Da Jesus an dem Kreuze stund". hymnary.org.
- Williams, Peter (2003). The Organ Music of J. S. Bach (2nd ed.). Cambridge University Press. ISBN 0-521-89115-9.
- Zahn, Johannes (1889). Die Melodien der deutschen evangelischen Kirchenlieder (in German). Vol. I. Gütersloh: Bertelsmann.
  - —— (1889). Die Melodien der deutschen evangelischen Kirchenlieder (in German). Vol. I. Gütersloh: Bertelsmann – via Internet Archive.
