= Gottfried Wilhelm Sacer =

German jurist, writer, and satirist

- Born: 11 July 1635; Naumburg (Saale)
- Died: 8 September 1699 (aged 64); Wolfenbüttel
- Occupations: Jurist; Poet; Satirist; Hymn writer

Gottfried Wilhelm Sacer (11 July 1635 – 8 September 1699) was a German jurist, poet, satirist and Protestant hymn writer. He worked as an advocate at the court of Wolfenbüttel. Johann Sebastian Bach used a stanza from his hymn "Gott fähret auf gen Himmel" to conclude his Ascension Oratorio. Another hymn, Jesu, meines Glaubens Zier, appears in the 1736 Schemelli Gesangbuch in a setting attributed to Bach.

== Career ==
Sacer was born in Naumburg, the son of the town's mayor. He was first educated by private teachers and from 1649 at the Landesschule Pforta. From 1654 he studied at the University of Jena law and literature. In 1657 he accepted a position as Hofmeister in Berlin where he had contact to poets such as Paul Gerhardt, Georg Philipp Harsdörffer and Andreas Tscherning. Johann Rist made him a member of the literary association Elbschwanenorden under the name Hierophilo.

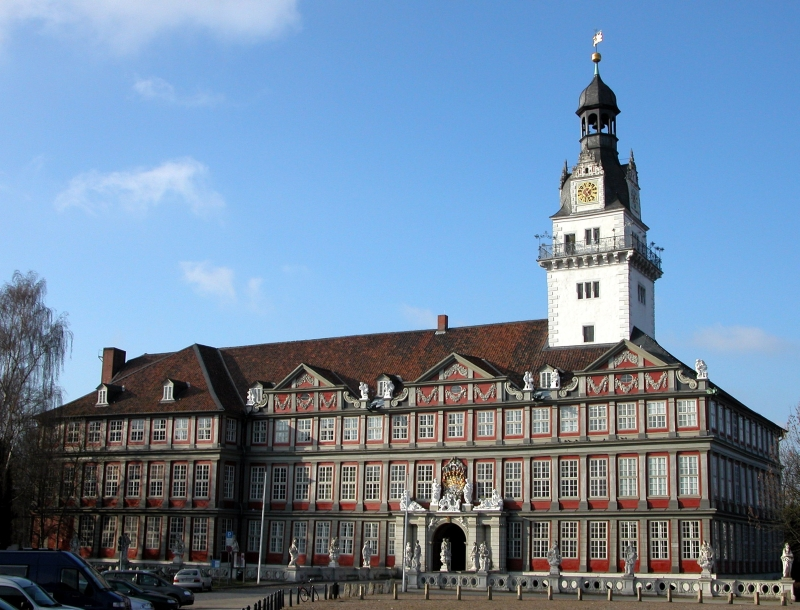
The Schloss in Wolfenbüttel, residence of the court

From 1669 he worked as an advocate at the court of Wolfenbüttel, a post for which he had to complete his studies. He achieved the doctorate in September 1671 in Kiel. His last post was Fürstlicher Kammerkonsulent (Ducal chamber counselor). He died in Wolfenbüttel and is buried in the Marienkirche, Wolfenbüttel.

== Work ==
Among Sacer's publications are:

- Nützliche Erinnerungen wegen der deutschen Poeterey. Stettin 1661
- Reime dich, oder ich fresse dich. Northausen (recte: Jena) 1673 (Digitalisat)
- (translation) Pierre Antoine Mascaron: Die letzten Worte des sterbenden Seneca. Leipzig 1666

Sacer's satirical writings, namely Reime dich, oder ich fresse dich, criticism of the work of his colleagues in poetry, are still read and often quoted.

=== "Gott fähret auf gen Himmel" ===
"Gott fähret auf gen Himmel"
- Hymn
- English: "Lo, God to Heaven Ascendeth!"
- Other name: "Der Herr fährt auf gen Himmel"
- Occasion: Ascension
- Text: by Gottfried Wilhelm Sacer
- Language: German
- Melody: "Von Gott will ich nicht lassen"
- Published: 1714

Sacer's hymn for Ascension in seven stanzas, "Gott fähret auf gen Himmel" (God goes up to Heaven) was published in Geistliche, liebliche Lieder (Spiritual, lovely songs) in Gotha in 1714, sung to the melody "Von Gott will ich nicht lassen". Later versions appear under the title "Der Herr fährt auf gen Himmel", for example the "Evangelisches Gesangbuch zum kirchlichen Gebrauche" (Protestant hymnal for church usage) of 1836, sometimes with six stanzas. Johann Sebastian Bach used the hymn's seventh stanza, "Wenn soll es doch geschehen", to conclude his Ascension Oratorio. Among Bach's hymn writers, Sacer was the only contemporary.

== Literature ==
- Max von Waldberg (1890). "Sacer, Georg Wilhelm" . Allgemeine Deutsche Biographie (in German). Vol. 30. Leipzig: Duncker & Humblot. pp. 111–113.
- Wolfgang Kelsch: Der Wolfenbütteler Jurist Gottfried Wilhelm Sacer als Verfasser einer barocken Literatursatire. In: Braunschweigisches Jahrbuch. 60, 1979, ISSN 0068-0745, pp. 85–97.
- Leopold Pfeil: Gottfried Wilhelm Sacers "Reime dich oder ich fresse dich". Northausen 1673. Winter, Heidelberg 1914 (Diss. Heidelberg 1914).
- Gerhard Dünnhaupt: "Gottfried Wilhelm Sacer (1635–1699)", in: Personalbibliographien zu den Drucken des Barock, vol. 5. Stuttgart: Hiersemann 1991, pp. 3517–26. ISBN 3-7772-9133-1
