= Sebald Heyden =

German musicologist, cantor, theologian, hymn-writer and religious poet

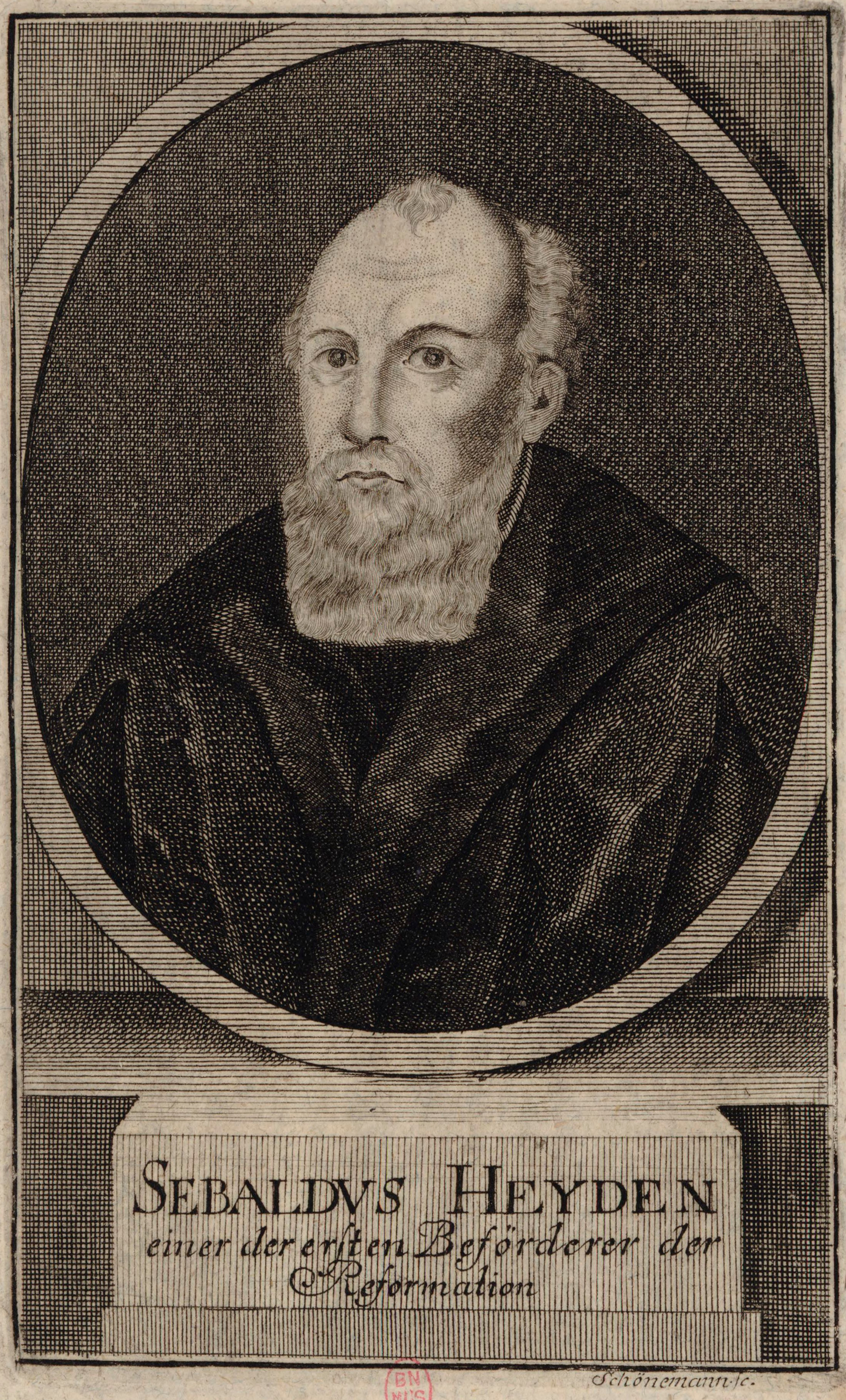
- Sebald Heyden
- Born: 8 December 1499; Bruck
- Died: 9 July 1561 (aged 61); Nuremberg
- Education: University of Ingolstadt
- Occupations: Musicologist; Cantor; Theologian; Hymnwriter; Religious poet
- Organizations: St. Sebald, Nuremberg
- Notable work: De arte canendi

Sebald Heyden (8 December 1499 – 9 July 1561) was a German musicologist, cantor, theologian, hymn-writer and religious poet. A member of the Haiden family of Nuremberg, he is perhaps best known for his De arte canendi ("On the Art of Singing", third installment published 1540) which is considered to have had a major impact on scholarship and the teaching of singing to young boys. He wrote hymns such as "O Mensch, bewein dein Sünde groß". It has been speculated that Heyden was the world's first true musicologist.

== Biography ==
Heyden was born in Bruck (now part of Erlangen) to a family of Nuremberg patricians. He studied under music theorist Johannes Cochlaeus at the school of St. Lorenz from 1505. He entered the University of Ingolstadt in 1513, graduating with a master's degree in 1519. From 1519 he worked as a cantor, and later as rector at the Nuremberg Hospital School. In January 1525 he was appointed the first Lutheran rector of the school of St. Sebald. Among his pupils was Nicholas Selnecker. He was in regular contact with Hans Sachs and Albrecht Dürer. Over the decades, Heyden developed a great reputation as a scholar, devoted to studies and writing on education, theology, and music. He was originally a Lutheran, but in the 1530s he became influenced by Zwingli.

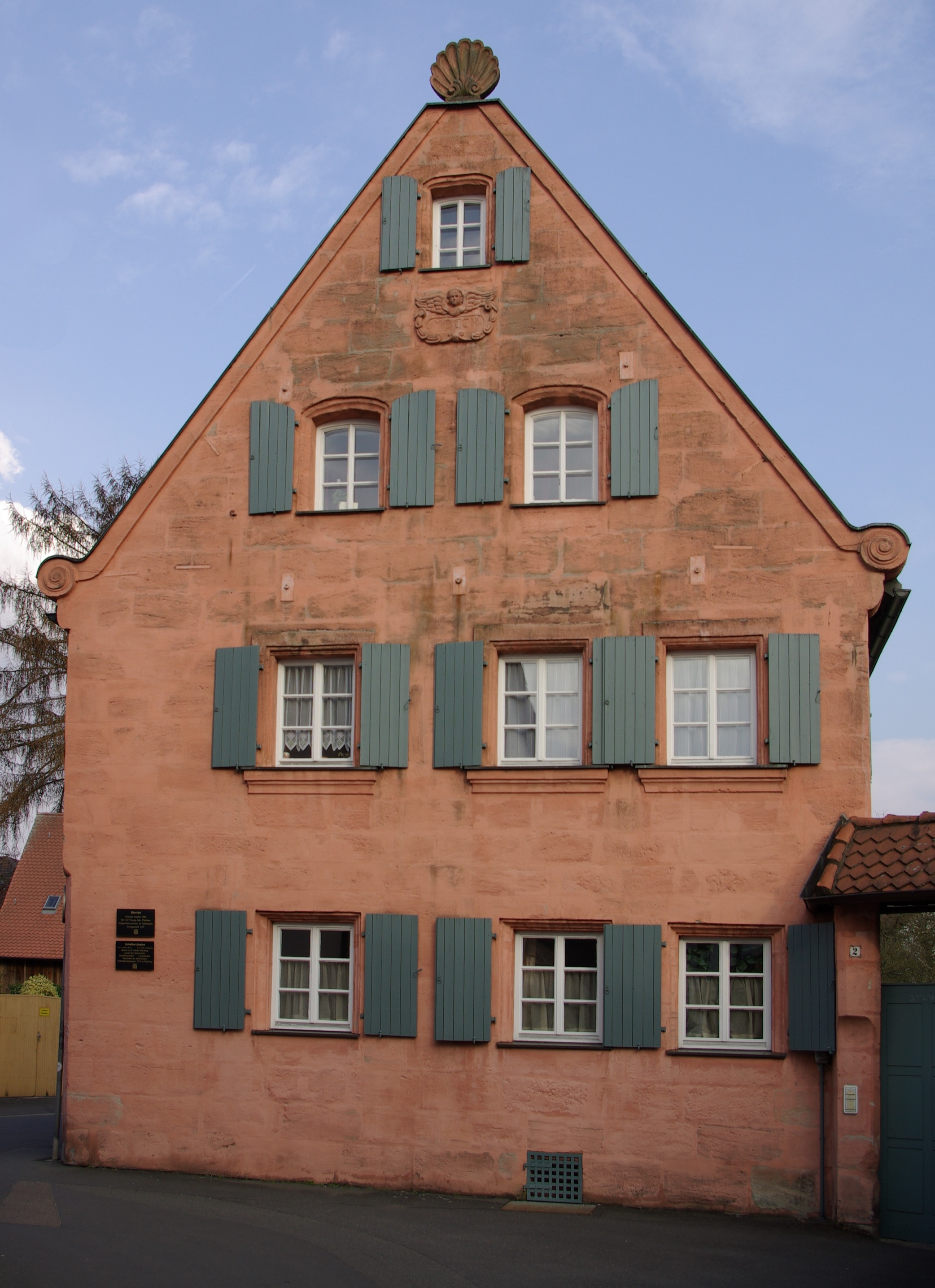
Heyden's birthplace

Heyden's first publications appeared around 1523–25, theological tracts such as Salve regina, which he gave to the Reichstag in a different Christian context. In 1524 he published Adversus Hypocritas Calumniatores, super falso sibi inustam haereseos nota, also a theological tract. In 1527 he began publishing textbooks such as Formulae puerilium colloquiorum (Nomenclatura). His Formulae immediately became an important work, used as a phrase book between German-, Polish-, and Hungarian-speaking students at the University of Krakow. In 1530, he wrote the hymn "O Mensch, bewein dein Sünde groß" (O man, bewail thy sins great). The Passion song reflects poetically in "great passion" the sufferings of Christ. He wrote it on a tune by Matthias Greitter, to the original text: "Es sind doch selig alle, die im rechten Glauben wandeln hie" (Blessed are they all who walk here in true faith). In 1532 he published further text books Leges scholasticae and Musicae stoicheiosis.

Heyden's De arte canendi, its third and final edition completed in Nuremberg in 1540, is said to have "had a greater impact on modern scholarship than any other writing on mensuration and tactus from the 15th or 16th century." A collection of secular songs, it has been described as a "treatise on singing technique aimed at the growing number of amateur musicians who wished to improve their skills." The first installment was produced in 1532 in 26 pages, the second in 1537 grew to 115 pages and the third in 1540 to 163 pages. From 1537, Heyden borrowed a copy of Tinctoris's Proportionale from Georg Forster and extensively studied the composers featured in it. Heyden also composed several hymns and poems. In the third installment, Heyden confessed to being an admirer of Josquin des Prez and his contemporaries, transcribing Josquin's Missa L'homme armé sexti toni (Benedictus), amongst others. Notably, Heyden is said to have "adopted a horror fusae position at a time when Italian musicians were writing pieces a note nere under the signature of C." Indeed, the treatise is said to have "influenced many twentieth-century scholars to believe that the tactus of the sixteenth century represented an unvarying beat." In 1546 he published Paedonomia scholastica pietatis, studii literarij ac morum.

Heyden died in Nuremberg.
