= Choeur d'hommes de Hombourg-Haut =

Chœur d'hommes de Hombourg-Haut
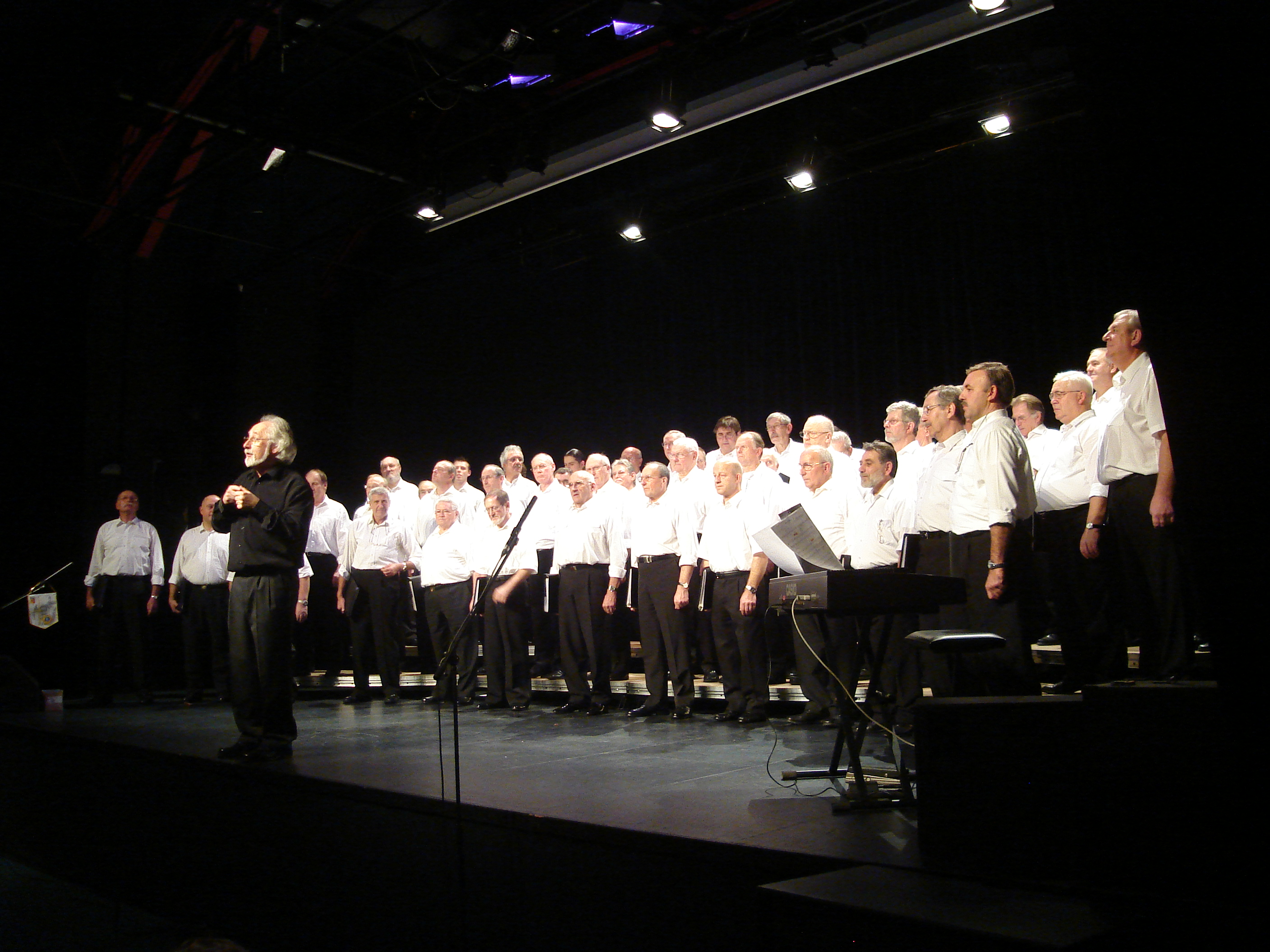
- The Choeur d'hommes de Hombourg-Haut (2009)

Background information
- Origin: Hombourg-Haut, France
- Genres: Choral Music
- Occupation: Choir
- Years active: 1865 – present

The Chœur d'hommes de Hombourg-Haut is a Men’s chorus in the city Hombourg-Haut (department of Moselle).

Formed in 1865. It is the oldest male voice choir in the historic region of Lorraine.

The choir consists of 65 amateur choristers directed by Norbert Ott. The choir has produced many recordings. Since 1990, it has been organizing annual musical encounters (Rencontres musicales) taking place at the collegiate church of Saint-Stephen in the old Hombourg.

== See also ==
- Théodore Gouvy
- Théodore Gouvy International Festival
