= Institut Théodore Gouvy =

French music organisation

The Théodore Gouvy Institute (French: Institut Théodore Gouvy) is a French music organisation based in Hombourg-Haut (in the historical region of Lorraine). Founded in 1995 its aims are to bring the name of the composer Théodore Gouvy (1819–1898) back to public consciousness. As a non-profit organisation, the Institute is subsidised by the town of Hombourg-Haut, the Department of Moselle and the region Grand Est.

== Publishing ==
The institute has made the inventory, presenting and making accessible to all interpreters, musicologists or students, works which henceforth can be considered as integral: that is 160 works completed of which only 90 were published by various well-known publishers of the period (Richault in Paris, Breitkopf & Härtel in Leipzig). Some having disappeared it was necessary to find their foundations often dispersed, furthermore it was necessary to recover non published manuscripts.

CD recordings, publications of new and first editions of the scores and much more besides, show the Institute’s wide activities. Close relationship has been established with the record company K 617 in order to make available major works of Théodore Gouvy such as his great dramatic cantatas Elektra op. 85, Egill op. 86 or the Stabat Mater op. 65, all for solos, choir and orchestra, needing new edition. The same for Chamber music works that were previously unpublished like the Septet and several string quartets and string quintets.

In the years 2010, close relationship has also been established with the German record label cpo, in particular for the symphonies and the cantatas Oedipus in Colonna Op．75 and Iphigénie en Tauride Op．76. With the later, the Institute also worked closely with the German musicologist and conductor Joachim Fontaine.

During the year 2013, a close cooperation has been run with the Palazetto Bru Zan. Have been organised performers residencies in Venice, recording sessions with the Liège Royal Philharmonic Orchestra and the rediscovery of several Gouvy's works.

== The Villa Gouvy ==
In order to promote Gouvy’s works the Institute has been set up within the Villa Gouvy, which is now owned by the town of Hombourg-Haut. From 1867 onwards, the composer used to spend the summer in this stately manor house built by his brother Alexandre.

Today it serves as an office for the institute and as a center of information with a permanent exhibit which shows aspects of Gouvy’s life as well as his musical estate fully accessible to the public. In constituting the “historic and musical collection” the Institute gathered all Gouvy’s music, as well as the documents, photographs, correspondence, souvenirs and other objects linked with the composer’s life and to become the privileged place for the revival of Gouvy’s works. Thanks to the composer’s heirs who all spontaneously accepted the reconstitution of the evocative universe of this maestro with a rare destiny.

== Research and cooperation with universities ==
In 2006, working together with the University of Saarland the first international conference about Theodore Gouvy was arranged and took place in Saarbrücken and Hombourg-Haut. The ensuing report has been published by Olms.

On the occasion of the bicentennial celebrations during the year 2019, the Institute has cooperated with the orchestra conductor Jacques Mercier on the second version of the cantata Aslega that Gouvy completed shortly before he died. The first version of this work has been created in Paris in 1878. With the bicentennial celebrations, the Institutes also cooperates with the two Universities Paris-Sorbonne and Paris-Diderot on the organisation of a symposium which takes place in Paris.

== See also ==
- Choeur d'hommes de Hombourg-Haut
