= Benoît Haller =

French conductor and tenor (born 1972)

- Born: 1972 (age 53–54); Strasbourg, France
- Occupations: Classical music conductor and tenor
- Known for: Founder of La Chapelle Rhénane
- Website: benoithaller.com

Benoît Haller is a French conductor and tenor, born in Strasbourg in 1972.

== Biography ==
Benoît Haller studied choral and orchestral conducting with Hans Michael Beuerle at the Hochschule für Musik in Fribourg-en-Brisgau. He studied singing with Hélène Roth then Beata Heuer-Christen, Gerd Heinz (opera) and Hans Peter Müller (song repertoire) from 1992 to 2002.

His repertoire includes baroque opera and classic and romantic oratorio.

He is the founder and musical director of the French baroque musical ensemble La Chapelle Rhénane, which he has headed since 2001.

His sister, Salomé Haller, is an operatic soprano.

== Selected discography ==
=== Benoît Haller, tenor ===
- Deutsche Kantaten - Tunder, Graupner, Bruhns, Kuhnau, Collegium Vocale Gent, Philippe Herreweghe on Harmonia Mundi label in 2000
- Missa pro defunctis - François-Joseph Gossec, La Grande Écurie et la Chambre du Roy, Jean-Claude Malgoire on K617, 2002
- Kantaten und Kammermusik - fr:Georg Philipp Telemann, Balthasar Neumann Ensemble, Han Tol on Carus Verlag label in 2004
- Salzburg Sacred Music - Wolfgang Amadeus Mozart, Kölner Kammerchor, Collegium Cartusianum, Peter Neumann on Musikproduktion Dabringhaus und Grimm, 2005
- Madrigali e Dialoghi - Domenico Mazzocchi, Les Paladins, Jérôme Correas (conductor) on Pan Classics label in 2006
- In bel Giardino - Konzertante Madrigale - Giovanni Valentini, Orlando di Lasso Ensemble, Detlev Bratschke on Édition Ch label - Alive in 2007

=== Benoît Haller conducting La Chapelle Rhénane ===
- Symphoniæ Sacræ • extraits du deuxième Livre (1647) - Heinrich Schütz, on K617 label in 2004
- Theatrum Musicum & Leçons de Ténèbres - Samuel Capricornus, on K617 label in 2006
- Histoire de la Résurrection & Musikalische Exequien - Heinrich Schütz, on K617 label in 2007
- Membra Jesu Nostri - Dietrich Buxtehude, on K617 label in 2008
- Passio secundum Johannem - Johann Sebastian Bach, on Zig-Zag Territoires/Outhere label in 2010
- Psalmen Davids • extraits du recueil de 1619 - Heinrich Schütz, on K617 label in 2012
