= Beata Heuer-Christen =

Swiss soprano

Beata Heuer-Christen (born 27 February 1935) is a Swiss-German soprano concert singer and voice teacher.

== Life ==
Born in Bern, Heuer-Christen is the daughter of the violinist and member of the Bern Symphony Orchestra, Caesar Christen, and Greti Christen-Schiffmann, also violinist in the Bern Symphony Orchestra and Primaria of the Schiffmann Quartet.

Heuer-Christen studied singing in Bern with Maria Helbling, in Freiburg with Margarethe von Winterfeldt and in Zurich with Dorothea Ammann-Goesch. After her studies, she first worked as a classical concert singer in oratorios, Lieder recitals, radio and television recordings in various countries. Her main focus was in the field of Neue Musik. She has performed world premieres under the direction of Arturo Tamayo, Hans Zender and Wolfgang Fortner.

Since 1962, she was a lecturer and from 1980 to 2005 professor for singing at the Hochschule für Musik Freiburg. She also gave master classes in the fields of oratorio, opera and lied.

Among her students are prize winners of national and international competitions as well as concert singers or singers with engagements at opera houses in Paris, Munich, Hamburg, Vienna, Dresden, Leipzig, Bern, Geneva and Basel. Among them are Maria Bengtsson, Rachel Harnisch, Bernhard Richter, Clemens Morgenthaler, Benoît Haller and Markus Flaig.
