= Théodore Gouvy International Festival =

- Status: Active
- Frequency: Annual
- Country: Hombourg-Haut Grand Est, France

The Théodore Gouvy International Festival (Festival international Théodore Gouvy) is an annual festival of classical music held in honour of Franco-German composer, Théodore Gouvy. The festival is located in Hombourg-Haut (region Grand Est), the town where the composer, from 1867 onwards, used to spend the summer with his family.

== Mission ==
The festival has been established by the Institut Théodore Gouvy and the Choeur d'hommes de Hombourg-Haut (male choir founded in 1865 with Gouvy's support). The festival is aimed at rediscovering the major works of the composer. The first edition took place in 1995. Since then, the festival is supported by the town of Hombourg-Haut, the region Grand Est and the Moselle (department).

The festival is intended to be a series of six concerts spread out over the year. A close relationship has been established with the Orchestre national de Lorraine, major participant in the Festival.

== Programming ==
Each concert associates a work of Gouvy with works of other composers. This mix is most often based on highlights of the musical scene or on other topical issues as the 10th anniversary of the twinning between Hombourg-Haut and San Giorgio di Pesaro in 2016 (with an Ouverture of Rossini, the 4th symphony of 4Mendelssohn and the 1st symphony of Gouvy (both symphonies have been composed in Italy).

Participating vocal groups, artists and orchestras include conductors like Pierre Cao, Jacques Mercier, Joachim Fontaine, soloists like Jean-Efflam Bavouzet, Françoise Pollet, Jean-Pierre Wallez…; choirs like the Choir of the monks of Saint-Alexander Nevski monastery, the female Choir Rimsky-Korsakov of Saint-Petersburg, Oxford Voices, Psalette de Lorraine…; chamber music ensembles like Ricercare or the Chamber Orchestra of the Grand Duchy of Luxembourg (KMVL)...; string quartets (Quatuor Varèse, Quatuor Denis Clavier) etc.

== Venues ==
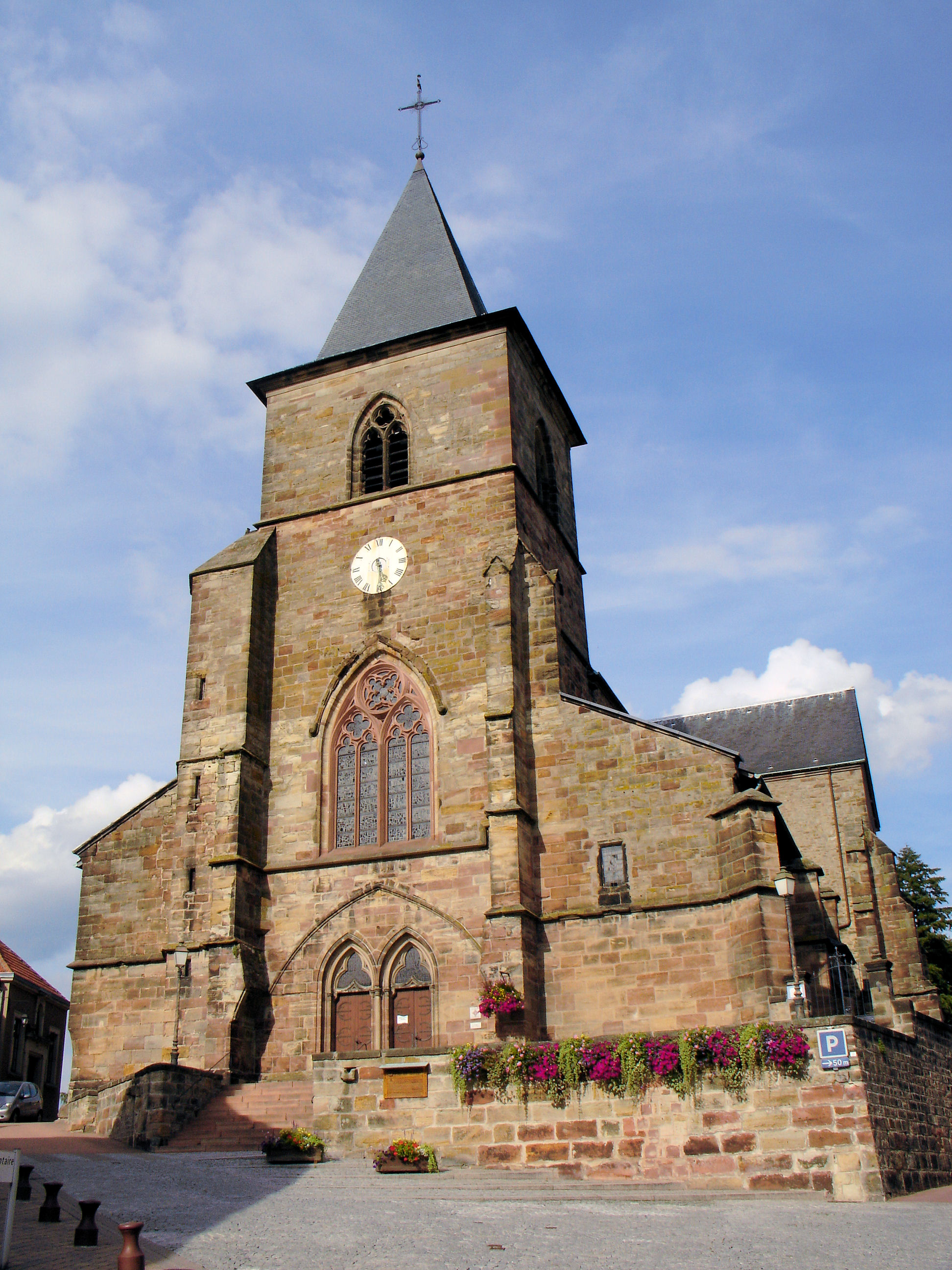
The Collegiate Church of St. Stephen, main venue in the festival.

The concerts are generally held in the collegiate church of Saint-Stephen. The New Year concert takes now place in the new "Espace Wendel".

== 30th edition of the festival in 2019 ==
The 30th edition coincides with the 200th anniversary of Théodore Gouvy's birth.

The fourth concert (on July 4, exactly 200 years after Gouvy's birth) provided the opportunity to inaugurate the statue erected in the honour of the composer and to re-create one of his cantatas, Aslega. This work has been premiered in Paris in 1876 and was the first cantata Gouvy composed for soloists, choir and orchestra. The composer reworked it (1888-1892). Nevertheless this second version (with German libretto) has never been published and performed. The performance was directed by Jacques Mercier.
