= Électre (Gouvy) =

Électre is a large-scale operatic oratorio–cantata by Théodore Gouvy from 1886.

== Recordings ==
Électre – Françoise Pollet (soprano), Marcel Vanaud (baritone), Cécile Eloir (mezzo-contralto), Michael Myers (tenor) Psallette de Lorraine, Ensemble Vocal Ars Musica, Le Chœur de l'Opéra national de Lorraine, Pierre Cao; K617, DDD/LA, 2CD 1998
