= Maria Bengtsson =

Maria Bengtsson may refer to:

- Maria Bengtsson (badminton) (born 1964), Swedish badminton player
- Maria Bengtsson (soprano) (born 1975), Swedish operatic soprano
