= Electre =

Electre may refer to:

- Électre (opera), a 1782 opera by the French composer Jean-Baptiste Lemoyne
- Électre (Gouvy), an 1886 operatic oratorio–cantata by Théodore Gouvy
- ELECTRE, ÉLimination et Choix Traduisant la REalité, a family of multi-criteria decision analysis methods that originated in Europe in the mid-1960s
