= Arsys Bourgogne =

French vocal ensemble (founded 1999)

Arsys Bourgogne is a French vocal ensemble. Founded in 1999 by Pierre Cao, it is now directed by Mihály Zeke.

== History ==
The choir was founded in October 1999 at the request of the Burgundy regional department of the French Ministry of Culture. It has worked with many different orchestras, including the Akademie für Alte Musik Berlin, the Concerto Köln, the Talens Lyriques, the Folies Françoises, the Cercle de l'Harmonie (Circle of Harmony), the Luxembourg Philharmonic Orchestra, the Stavanger Symphonic Orchestra, the Limoges Baroque Ensemble, the Orchestra of European Soloists and the La Fenice Ensemble.

The ensemble has also performed in many different theatres, including the Tonhalle in Zürich, the Bruges Concertgebouw, the Teatro Real in Madrid, the Philharmonie Luxembourg, the Théâtre des Champs-Élysées and Cité de la Musique in Paris, the Arsenal de Metz and the Auditorium de Dijon. The group has been invited to many festivals, both in France and abroad, including La Folle Journée.

Pierre Cao, the founder of the choir, retired as director after their concert on July 27, 2014. In March 2015, Mihály Zeke was named the new director.

== Repertoire ==
While the ensemble originally focused on performing Renaissance, Baroque and Classical music, it has now diversified its repertoire somewhat, including with works of contemporary composers.

== Discography ==
- "Naissance de Vénus" (The Birth of Venus), a-cappella works by Debussy, Ravel, Schmitt, Poulenc, Messiaen, Milhaud & Canteloube. Arsys Bourgogne conducted by Mihály Zeke (Paraty records, 2018)
- "La France par Chœur" (France by Choir), Arsys Bourgogne, with Bruno Fontaine, Ophélie Gaillard, Bruno Martinez & Daniel Ciampolini
- "Chants de Noël du monde" (Christmas Songs of the World), works of Praetorius, Mathias, Willcocks, Gruber & Mendelssohn. Arsys Bourgogne, conducted by Pierre Cao (2011)
- "Hymne à la nuit" (Hymn of the Night) by Jean-Christophe Cholet. Arsys Bourgogne with Jean-Christophe Cholet, Heiri Kanzig, Marcel Papaux & Elise Caron (2009)
- "Israel in Egypt" by Georg Friedrich Händel. Arsys Bourgogne, Concerto Köln, conducted by Pierre Cao. With Julia Doyle, Martene Grimson, Robin Blaze, James Oxley, Peter Harvey & Stefan MacLeod (2009)
- "Telemann & Haendel: Dixit Dominus", works of de Georg Friedrich Händel et Georg Philipp Telemann. Arsys Bourgogne & Harmonie Universelle, conducted by Pierre Cao. With Yeree Suh, Ingrid Perruche, Britta Schwarz, Markus Schäfer, Alain Buet & Arnaud Richard
- "Paroles de vents" (Words of the Winds), works of Michael Haydn & Georg Druschetzky. Arsys Bourgogne et Zefiro, conducted by Pierre Cao. with Johannette Zomer, Britta Schwarz, Guy De Mey & Cornelius Hauptmann
- "Vêpres pour Sainte Marie-Madeleine" (Vespers for Saint Mary Magdalene), works of Thierry Escaich, Pierre-Adrien Charpy, Nicolas Bacri, Guillaume Connesson, Régis Campo, Philippe Fénelon. Arsys Bourgogne, conducted by Pierre Cao (& Schola Gregoriana Pragensis, conducted by David Eben)
- "Biber - Musique au dôme de Salzbourg" (Biber — Music at the Salzbourg Dome), works of Heinrich Biber. Arsys Bourgogne, conducted by Pierre Cao
- "Motetten", by Jean-Sébastien Bach, Arsys Bourgogne, avec les Basses Réunies (the Reunited Basses), conducted by Pierre Cao
- "Vêpres sous Charles VI à Vienne" (Vespers under Charles VI in Vienna), works of Fux, Gletle, Reinhardt, Sances et Zacher. Arsys Bourgogne, with l'Arpeggiata & Christina Pluhar, conducted by Pierre Cao
- "Vêpres pour le Père La Chaize" (Vespers for Father La Chaize), by Pierre Menault. Arsys Bourgogne & La Fenice, conducted de Jean Tubéry

== Awards ==
- L'Orphée d'Or of the Académie du Disque lyrique, 2011
