= Saint Catherine's chapel (Hombourg-Haut) =

Chapelle Sainte Catherine
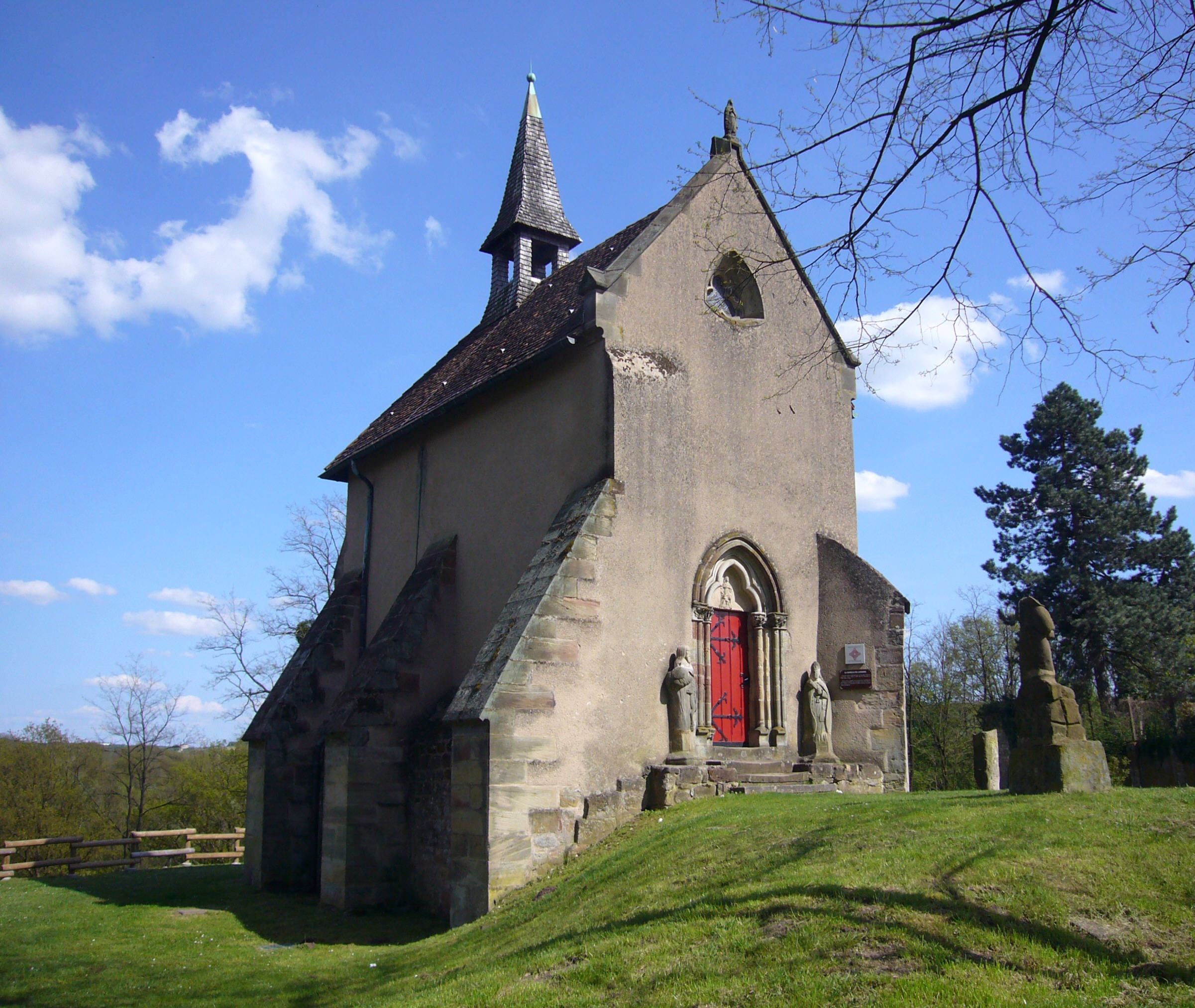

Religion
- Affiliation: Roman Catholic
- Diocese: Moselle (department)
- Ecclesiastical or organizational status: Monument historique

Location
- Location: Hombourg-Haut, France
- Interactive map of Chapelle Sainte Catherine
- Coordinates: 49.1288°N 6.7854°E

Architecture
- Type: church
- Style: Gothic
- Completed: 1270

The Chapelle Sainte Catherine is a Roman Catholic chapel located in Hombourg-Haut, in the historic region of Lorraine, France.

Built by the knight Simon of Hombourg between 1250 and 1270, it initially was a private chapel, surrounded by the buildings of the knights' castle. Its towers and walls made up the outer part of a big medieval castle.

The chapel was renovated in 1706, 1897 and 1984. It was registered as a listed building in 1895 under German authority and again in 1930 as Monument historique.
