= Château d'Hausen =

City hall of Hombourg-Haut

Coordinates: 49°07′26″N 6°46′26″E

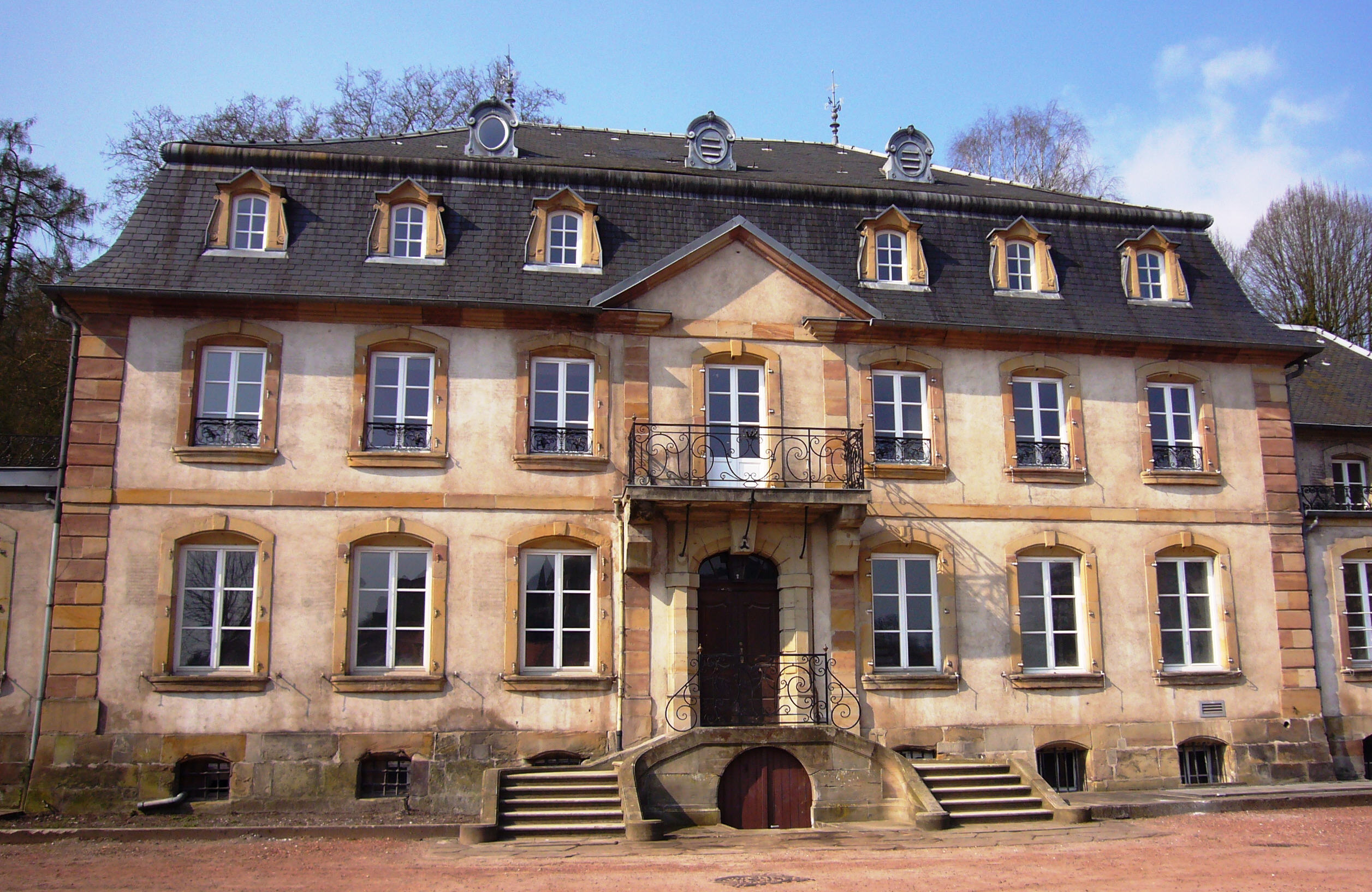
The Château d’Hausen

The Château d’Hausen is the current home of the city hall of Hombourg-Haut, in the historic region of Lorraine, France. It is located on the rue de Metz (RN3) roundabout at the west entrance of the city.

The history of this mansion is closely related to the industrial past of the city. Built in 1766 for Jean-Charles de Wendel and his wife Anne Marguerite d'Hausen de Weidesheim, it was at that time located near the forge the de Wendel had erected a few years before (1758–59). The château (as well as the forge) stayed in the d’Hausen family until 1882, when it was acquired by the Gouvy family. After the Second World War, the Château d’Hausen came under the ownership of the HBL, the state coal corporation in Lorraine, and served as the corporation board's seat until 1996.

In 2004, the city purchased the building and converted it for use as the town hall. The Château d'Hausen is a listed historic monument since 2019.
