= Žerčice =

- Municipality
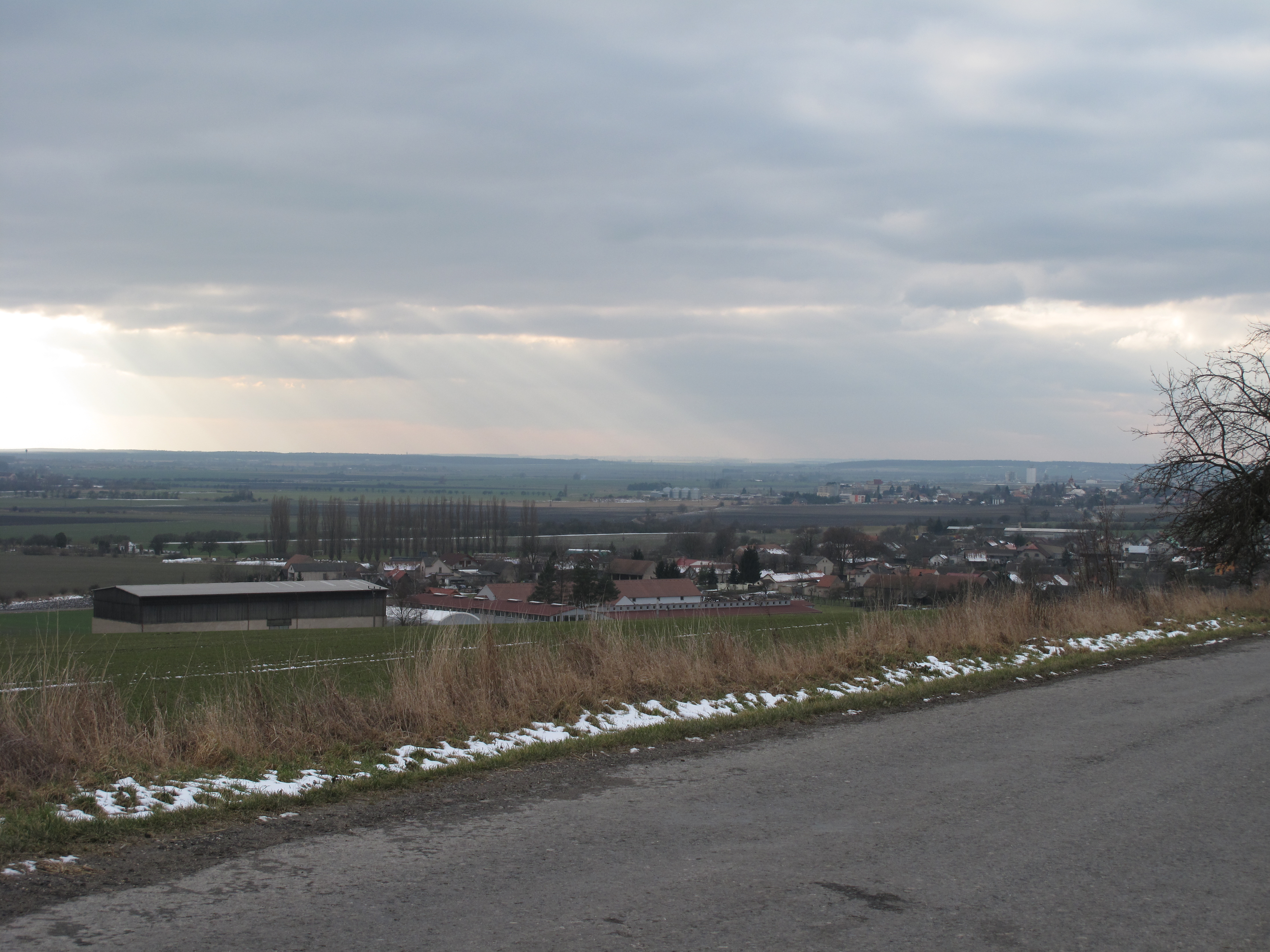
- View from the north

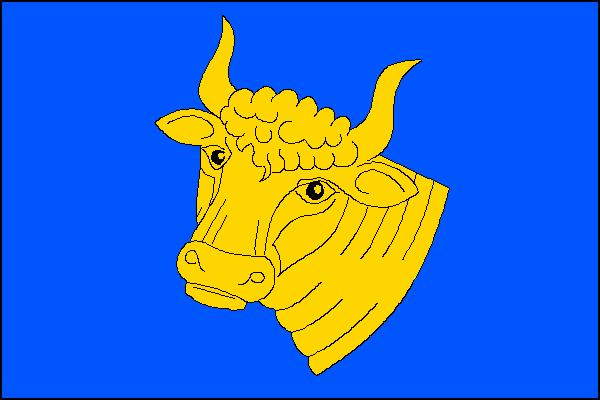
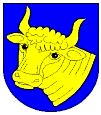
- Flag Coat of arms

- Location in the Czech Republic
- Coordinates: 50°22′27″N 15°2′10″E
- Country: Czech Republic
- Region: Central Bohemian
- District: Mladá Boleslav
- First mentioned: 1070

Area
  - Total: 7.78 km^{2} (3.00 sq mi)
- Elevation: 241 m (791 ft)

Population (2026-01-01)
  - Total: 406
  - Density: 52.2/km^{2} (135/sq mi)
- Time zone: UTC+1 (CET)
  - Summer (DST): UTC+2 (CEST)
- Postal code: 294 46
- Website: www.zercice.cz

Žerčice a municipality and village in Mladá Boleslav District in the Central Bohemian Region of the Czech Republic. It has about 400 inhabitants.

== Etymology ==
The name is probably derived from the personal name Žirka, meaning "the village of Žirka's people". The oldest form of the name was Žrčinaves.

== Geography ==
Žerčice is located about 9 kilometres (6 mi) southeast of Mladá Boleslav and 48 km (30 mi) northeast of Prague. It lies on the border between the Jičín Uplands and Jizera Table. The highest point is the hill Žlábky at 316 m (1,037 ft) above sea level. The Vlkava River flows through the municipality. There is a system of fishponds in the southern part of the territory.

== History ==
The first written mention of Žerčice is from 1070, in Chronica Boemorum. The greatest boom of Žerčice occurred during the rule of Hanuš Bryknár of Brukštejn in the early 16th century. The village was promoted to a market town in 1511. In 1621, Žerčice was purchased by the Waldstein family and joined to the Dobrovice estate. In 1639, during the Thirty Years' War, Žerčice was burned down by the Swedish army and ceased to be a market town.

== Demographics ==
Historical population

Year	Pop.	±%
1869	467	—
1880	599	+28.3%
1890	604	+0.8%
1900	564	−6.6%
1910	535	−5.1%

Year	Pop.	±%
1921	562	+5.0%
1930	583	+3.7%
1950	479	−17.8%
1961	469	−2.1%
1970	401	−14.5%

Year	Pop.	±%
1980	381	−5.0%
1991	323	−15.2%
2001	322	−0.3%
2011	367	+14.0%
2021	381	+3.8%

Source: Censuses

== Transport ==
There are no railways or major roads passing through the municipality.

== Sights ==
The main landmark of Žerčice is the Church of Saint Nicholas. It was built in the Baroque style in 1730 according to the design of the architect František Maxmilián Kaňka. It replaced an old church, first mentioned in 1384.

Next to the primary school is a statue of Saint Florian from 1770.

== Notable people ==
- Samuel Capricornus (1628–1665), composer
