= Rachel Harnisch =

Swiss soprano

Rachel Harnisch (born 1 August 1973) is a Swiss operatic soprano.

== Life ==
Born in Brig, Harnisch studied at the Hochschule für Musik Freiburg with Beata Heuer-Christen. In 2000, she made her debut as Pamina (The Magic Flute) at the Stadttheater Bern under the direction of Miguel Gomez-Martinez and at the Zürich Opera House with Franz Welser-Möst. Further engagements took her to the Grand Théâtre de Genève, to Zurich and to Santiago de Chile.

In 2004, she was Fiordiligi in Così fan tutte in Ferrara under the direction of Claudio Abbado. In Modena and Reggio nell'Emilia, she sang Micaela in Carmen, also in Bern and Avenches. She made her debut in Paris at the Opéra Bastille as Pamina, directed by Robert Wilson and under the musical direction of Jiří Kout. In 2006, she sang her first Contessa in Le nozze di Figaro in Verona. In 2007, she made her debut at the Deutsche Oper Berlin as Pamina, followed by her first Amor in Orfeo ed Euridice conducted by Leopold Hager in 2008 and Clémence in Kaija Saariaho's L'amour de loin) in Antwerp and Ghent in 2009. In 2011, she sang Blanche Dialogues des Carmélites at the Deutsche Oper Berlin.

In 2012, she sang Hélène d'Egmont in the world premiere of Gaetano Donizetti's Le duc d'Albe at the Vlaamse Opera in Antwerp and Ghent. The work, unfinished by Donizetti, was completed by the contemporary composer Giorgio Battistelli who was present at the premiere.

As a concert singer, Harnisch sang Luigi Nono's Prometeo-Suite, Tippetts A Child of Our Time, Schumanns Szenen aus Goethes Faust, Mendelssohn's Elijah and A Midsummer Night's Dream, Debussy's Le Martyre de Saint Sébastien, Haydn's the Creation and the Caecilien-Messe, Händel's Messiah, Bach's St John Passion, Mahler's Symphony No. 2 and Symphony No. 4, Pergolesis Stabat Mater, Haydn's L’isola disabitata, Mozart's Requiem and Great Mass in C minor, K. 427, Beethoven's Symphony No. 9, Brahms' Ein deutsches Requiem and Poulenc's Gloria with conductors like Claudio Abbado, Kent Nagano and Nikolaus Harnoncourt.

With Lieder recitals - together with Irwin Gage, Maurizio Pollini, Cedric Pescia and Jan Philip Schulze - she has performed in Zurich, Geneva, Bochum, Berlin, Bern, Florence, Perugia, Rome and at the Lucerne Festival.

== Recordings ==
- Requiem KV 626. Universal Music, 1999
- Matthäuspassion. Musik-Forschung-Verlag, 2000
- Die Schöpfung. Musik-Forschung-Verlag, 2000
- Stabat mater. Universal Music, 2009
- Fidelio. Universal Music, 2011
