= Alexandre Dratwicki =

French musicologist

Alexandre Dratwicki (born 31 January 1977 in Thionville, Moselle) is a contemporary French musicologist.

== Biography ==
Scientific director of the Palazzetto Bru Zane – Centre de musique romantique française (Venice), holder of a doctorate in musicology from the Paris-Sorbonne University in 2003) and former resident of the Académie de France à Rome (Villa Médicis), Alexandre Dratwicki is a graduate from the Conservatoire de Paris (esthetics). He has taught music history and musical analysis in several French universities (Paris IV - Sorbonne, Lille, Poitiers, Rouen) and was a radio producer for Radio France (La Querelle des Bouffons and Sortez les jumelles in 2006–2007) with his twin brother Benoît Dratwicki. In 2006–2008, he was artistic advisor to the Opéra-Comique (Paris).

Alexandre Dratwicki has been trained as a clarinetist and violist at the Metz and Nancy conservatories. He also received various awards in music history, musical analysis, orchestration and chamber music.

As a musicologist, he has published notably at Actes Sud, Somogy Éditions d'art, Éditions du Cavalier bleu and Symétrie. His work Un nouveau commerce de la virtuosité (1780–1830), published by the latter earned him the 2007 Prix des Muses for essay. In 2013 he received a prize of the Napoléon foundation for the record-book La Mort d'Abel by Kreutzer, which he directed. As a researcher, he is particularly interested in the notions of virtuosity (direction of the collective Le concerto pour piano français à l'épreuve des modernités, Actes Sud & Palazzetto Bru Zane, 2015) and musical academism (codirection with Julia Lu of the Concours du prix de Rome for music. 1803–1968, Symétrie & Palazzetto Bru Zane, 2011).

Since 2009, through his activity at the Palazzetto Bru Zane, which consists of rediscovering unknown works and forgotten composers, He participates in productions or co-productions leading to the (re) creation of French works in concert and on the stage, extended in general by the publication of recordings. In this context, Alexandre Dratwicki has been conducting the series "Musics of the Prix de Rome" launched at Glossa and continued in the series of record-books of Palazzetto Bru Zane since 2010 (Debussy, Saint-Saëns, Charpentier, d'Ollone, Dukas). In 2012, he started the series "Opéras français" of the Palazzetto Bru Zane (with Amadis de Gaule by JC Bach and La Mort d'Abel by Kreutzer) and subsequently, in 2014, that of the "Portraits" (with Théodore Gouvy).

== Selected publications ==
=== Books ===
- Un nouveau commerce de la virtuosité : émancipation et métamorphoses de la musique concertante au sein des institutions musicales parisiennes (1780-1830), preface by Jean Gribenski, Lyon, Symétrie, 2006. Prix des Muses 2007 (category: musicological essay) ISBN 9782914373111,
- Mozart, Paris, Le Cavalier bleu (series: Idées reçues), 2006 ISBN 9782846701341.
- Mozart. Paris, 1778, in collaboration with Benoît Dratwicki, Versailles, Centre de musique baroque de Versailles, 2006.

=== Direction of collective works ===
- Le concerto pour piano français à l'épreuve des modernités, Actes Sud & Palazzetto Bru Zane, 2015 ISBN 9782330053369.
- Le surnaturel sur la scène lyrique : du merveilleux baroque au fantastique romantique, codirected with Agnès Terrier, Lyon, Symétrie, 2012. Prix des Muses 2011 (mention) ISBN 9782914373760.
- Le Concours du prix de Rome de musique (1803-1968), codirected with Julia Lu, Lyon, Symétrie, 2011 ISBN 2914373511.
- L’invention des genres lyriques français et leur redécouverte au XIX, codirected with Agnès Terrier, Lyon, Symétrie, 2010, ISBN 9782914373654.
- Hérold en Italie, Lyon, Symétrie, 2009 ISBN 9782914373449.
- L’Artiste et sa muse, codirected with Christiane Dotal, Paris, Somogy, 2006, ISBN 9782757200094.

=== Critical editions of literary sources ===
- Castil-Blaze: Histoire de l’opéra-comique, copublished with Patrick Taïeb, Lyon, Symétrie, 2012 ISBN 2914373694.
- Théodore Dubois: Journal, copublished with Charlotte Segond-Genovesi, Lyon, Symétrie, 2012 ISBN 9782914373791.
- Hérold en Italie, édition critique de la correspondance italienne de Hérold between 1813 and 1821, Lyon, Symétrie, 2009 ISBN 9782914373449.

=== Direction of book-records ===
Series Opéra français.

- Félicien David : Herculanum, Venice, Palazzetto Bru Zane (series: Opéra français), 2015.
- Antonio Salieri : Les Danaïdes, Venice, Palazzetto Bru Zane (series: Opéra français), 2015.
- Camille Saint-Saëns : Les Barbares, Venice, Palazzetto Bru Zane (series: Opéra français), 2014.
- Charles-Simon Catel : Les Bayadères, Venice, Palazzetto Bru Zane (series: Opéra français), 2014.
- Victorin Joncières: Dimitri, Venise, Palazzetto Bru Zane (series: Opéra français), 2014.
- Jules Massenet: Le Mage, Venice, Palazzetto Bru Zane (series: Opéra français), 2013.
- Antonio Sacchini: Renaud, Venice, Palazzetto Bru Zane (series: Opéra français), 2013.
- Jules Massenet: Thérèse, Venice, Palazzetto Bru Zane (series: Opéra français), 2013.
- Johann Christian Bach: Amadis de Gaule, Venice, Palazzetto Bru Zane (series: Opéra français), 2012.
- Rodolphe Kreutzer: La Mort d’Abel, Venice, Palazzetto Bru Zane (series: Opéra français), 2012. Prix de la Fondation Napoléon, 2013 ISBN 9788493968618.

Series Musiques du prix de Rome

- Paul Dukas et le prix de Rome, Venise, Palazzetto Bru Zane (series: Musiques du prix de Rome), 2015.
- Max d'Ollone et le prix de Rome, cowritten with Patrice d’Ollone, Venice, Palazzetto Bru Zane (series: Musiques du prix de Rome), 2013.
- Gustave Charpentier et le prix de Rome, cowritten with Michela Niccolai, San Lorenzo, Glossa (series: Musiques du prix de Rome), 2011.
- Camille Saint-Saëns et le prix de Rome, San Lorenzo, Glossa (series: Musiques du prix de Rome), 2011 ISBN 9788461452033.
- Claude Debussy et le prix de Rome, codirected with Denis Herlin, San Lorenzo, Glossa (series: Musiques du prix de Rome), 2009.

Series Portraits

- Théodore Dubois, Venice, Palazzetto Bru Zane (series: Portraits), 2015.
- Théodore Gouvy, Venice, Palazzetto Bru Zane (series: Portraits), 2014.
- series Hervé Niquet - Le Concert Spirituel at Glossa
- Johann Christoph Vogel: La Toison d'or, San Lorenzo, Glossa, 2013.
- Charles-Simon Catel: Sémiramis, San Lorenzo, Glossa, 2012.
