= Philipp Friedrich Böddecker =

German organist and composer

Philipp Friedrich Böddecker (christened 5 August 1607 in Hagenau - 8 October 1683 in Stuttgart) was a German court organist and composer.

While organist at the Stiftskirche he engaged in a bitter dispute with Samuel Capricornus at the Württemberg Court. His brother was the cornettist David Böddecker.
