= Château de Hombourg-Haut =

Former castle in France

Coordinates: 49.1275°N 6.7813°E

The Château de Hombourg-Haut is a ruined castle in the commune of Hombourg-Haut in the Moselle département of France. There are few remains.

The castle was built around 1254 by the Bishop of Metz, Jacques de Lorraine. It remained the property of the Bishops of Metz until 1572. In 1581, it was sold to the Duke of Lorraine (Charles III). The castle was enlarged at the end of the 16th and beginning of the 17th centuries. Two circular towers defended the northern side, with artillery bastions added in 1619 and 1631; these towers are clearly visible in a 1736 plan. It was ruined during the Thirty Years' War in 1634, when Cardinal Richelieu's troops conscripted local inhabitants to demolish it, the Duke's family having fled. Further damage was caused in the early 18th century, before the castle was entirely destroyed around 1735.

The property of the commune, it has been listed since 1930 as a monument historique by the French Ministry of Culture.

== See also ==
- List of castles in France
