= Hombourg-Haut =

- Commune
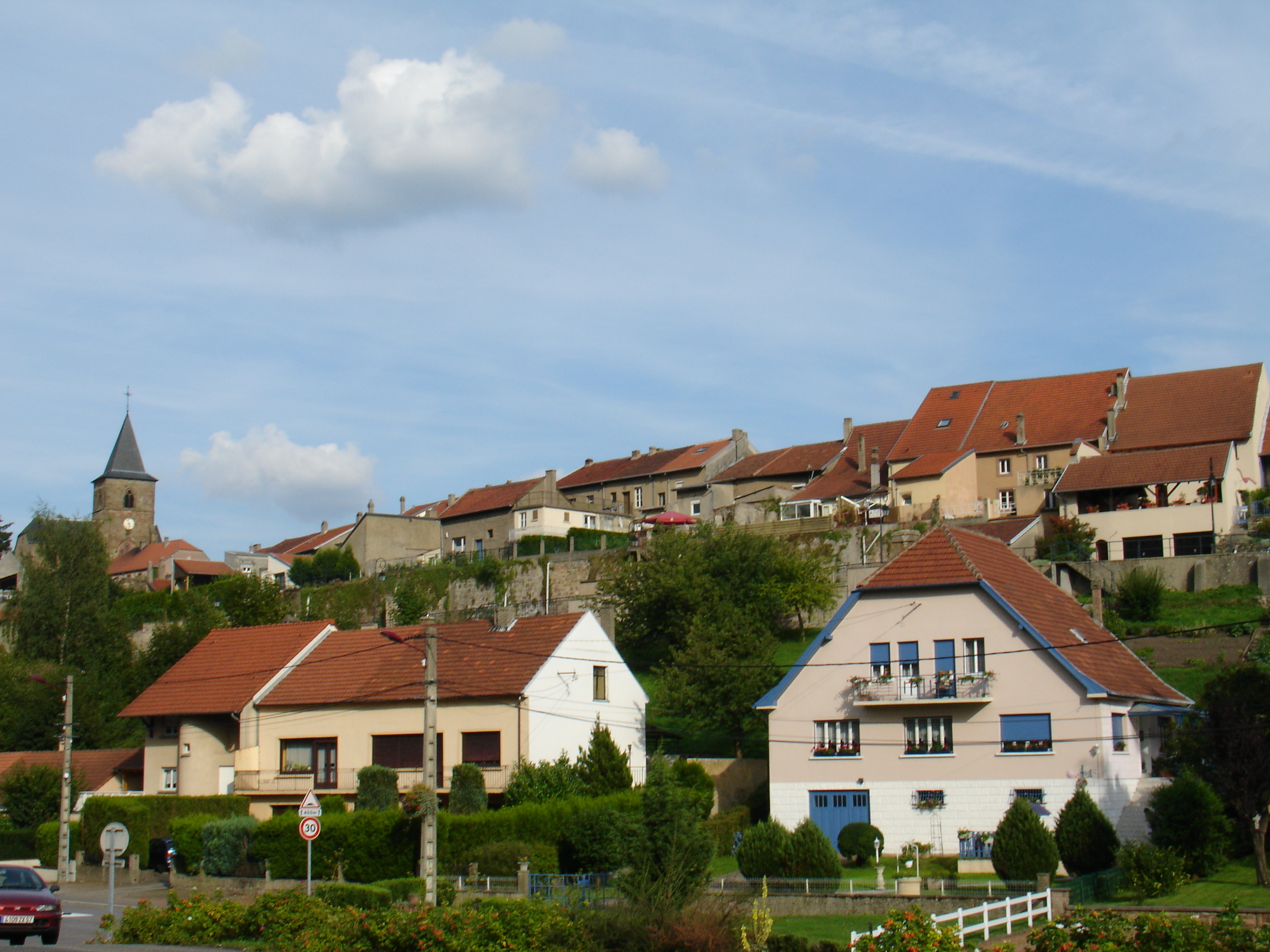
- View from the train station of old Hombourg

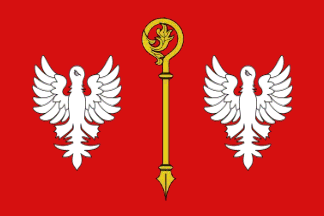
- Flag Coat of arms
- Location of Hombourg-Haut
- Location within France Location within Grand Est
- Coordinates: 49°07′36″N 6°46′43″E
- Country: France
- Region: Grand Est
- Department: Moselle
- Arrondissement: Forbach-Boulay-Moselle
- Canton: Freyming-Merlebach
- Intercommunality: Freyming-Merlebach

Government
  - Mayor (2020–2026): Laurent Muller
- Area^{1}: 12.25 km^{2} (4.73 sq mi)
- Highest elevation: 354 m (1,161 ft)
- Lowest elevation: 209 m (686 ft)
- Population (2023): 5,976
  - Density: 487.8/km^{2} (1,263/sq mi)
- Time zone: UTC+01:00 (CET)
  - Summer (DST): UTC+02:00 (CEST)
- INSEE/Postal code: 57332 /57470
- ^{1} French Land Register data, which excludes lakes, ponds, glaciers > 1 km^{2} (0.386 sq mi or 247 acres) and river estuaries.

Hombourg-Haut (French pronunciation: [ɔ̃buʁ o]; German: Oberhomburg) is a commune located in the department of Moselle, region of Grand Est, in the cultural and historical region Lorraine, north-eastern France.

Hombourg-Haut is an old medieval fortress town, built in the thirteenth century by the bishops of Metz. The old village lies at the foot of the imposing collegiate church in a green and wooded landscape.

Nowadays, the city has several neighbourhoods: the old Hombourg, the old village of Hellering, urban areas with HLMs built in the 1950s-1960s and residential district. The inhabitants of the commune are known as Hombourgeois and Hombourgeoises.

== History ==
=== Middle Ages ===
After a bitter dispute over the ownership of the castle of "Hombourg-Bas" (the old castle) between the Duke of Lorraine and the bishop of Metz, the latter prevailed end of the 12th century. Hombourg remained the property of the prelates of Metz until the 16th century. In 1270, the bishop, Jacques of Lorraine, decided to build a new and splendid castle on the opposite elongated hill, probably from 1245 on.

This castle became the main seat of the bailiwick of Hombourg/St-Avold. It was the residence of the bishops' representatives and sometimes of the prelates themselves. In front of the castle, Jacques of Lorraine got a fortified town built, surrounded by a long wall, today's "Vieux-Hombourg". Jacques granted his new town privileges and rights and in 1254, he founded a collegiate church with 13 capitular canons that was run until 1743. The collegiate got a new church built in 1300 which took almost a century to complete.

=== Industrial revolution and steel production ===
In 1758, Charles de Wfendel founded an ironworks at the banks of the Roselle. That was the beginning of the industrial era of Hamburg-Haut. The ironworks was taken over by the d'Hausen family during the First Empire. The Gouvy family from Saarland bought the factory in 1850 and transformed it into a modern steel plant. Providing employment to generations of Hombourg's inhabitants, the Gouvy steel mill also supported music, sports, youth movements and other leisure activities. The Münch family continued the work of the Gouvys when they bought the factory in 1935, offering work to almost 250 employees. The plant ceased opérations permanently during the 1980s. Following the mill demolition, a shopping centre has been built on the site.

== Geography ==
Hombourg-Haut is situated thirty two miles east of Metz (capital of the département de la Moselle) and thirteen miles southwest of Saarbrücken (Germany). It is surrounded by the following towns and villages: Saint-Avold, Freyming-Merlebach, Betting, Guenviller and Macheren.

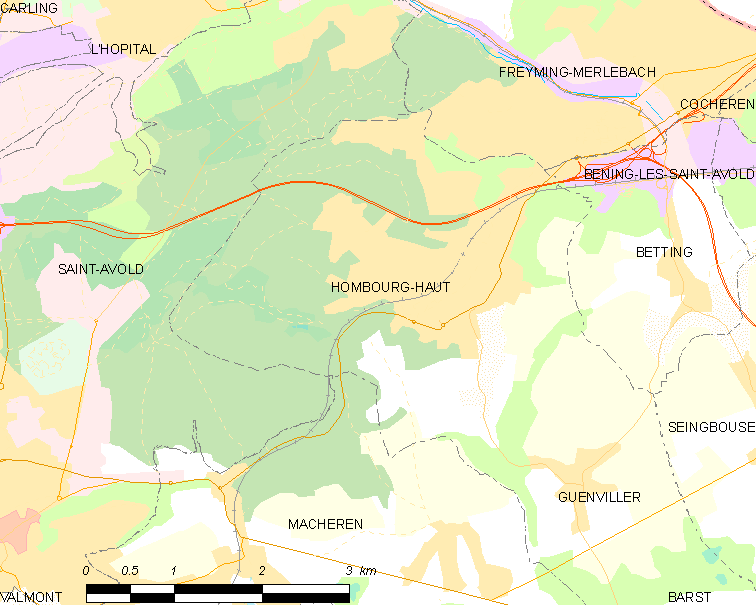
Carte de la commune.

The Rosselle, a small affluent of the Saar, flows through Hombourg-Haut.

An aerial view of the old Hombourg.

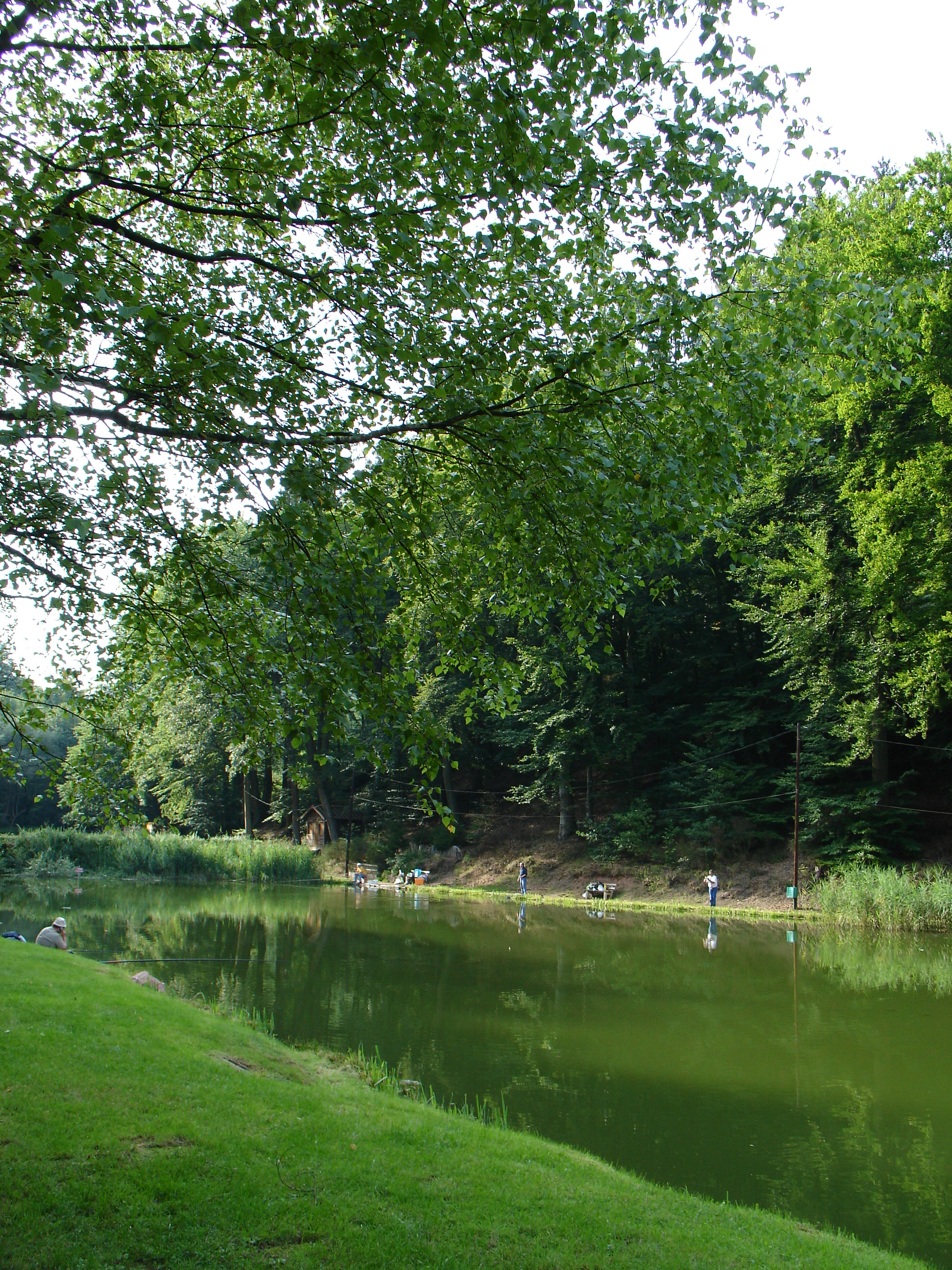
The pond "Papiermühle".

== Population ==
Historical population
Year	Pop.	±% p.a.
1968	10,571	—
1975	10,401	−0.23%
1982	10,055	−0.48%
1990	9,580	−0.60%
1999	9,486	−0.11%
2007	8,048	−2.03%
2012	7,058	−2.59%
2017	6,433	−1.84%
2023	5,976	−1.22%
Source: INSEE

== City government ==
=== Mayors ===
- Jean Derrieux, 1937-1971
- Albert Muller, 1971–1983
- Jean-Loup Schouller, 1983–2001
- Roland Kazmierczak, 2001-2006
- Jacques Furman, 2008-2014
- Laurent Muller, since 2014

=== Municipal offices ===
- The Espace de Wendel: inaugurated in January 2019, this venue is named after the de Wendel family, ironmasters in Lorraine with an early forge in Hombourg-Haut during the 18th Century (Jean-Charles de Wendel (1708-1784) was the first owner of the forge in Hombourg-Haut where he also built a mansion).

=== Tourist office ===
The tourist office is located near the railway station. It is run by the Communauté de communes de Freyming-Merlebach, a federation of municipalities in the French law.

== Culture and heritage sites ==
=== Civic sites ===
- Château de Hombourg-Haut, the ruins of the medieval castle and fortress of Hombourg.
- the ruins of the castle of Hellering (17th century).
- the Château d'Hausen, is an 18th-century castle. Current home of the local government.
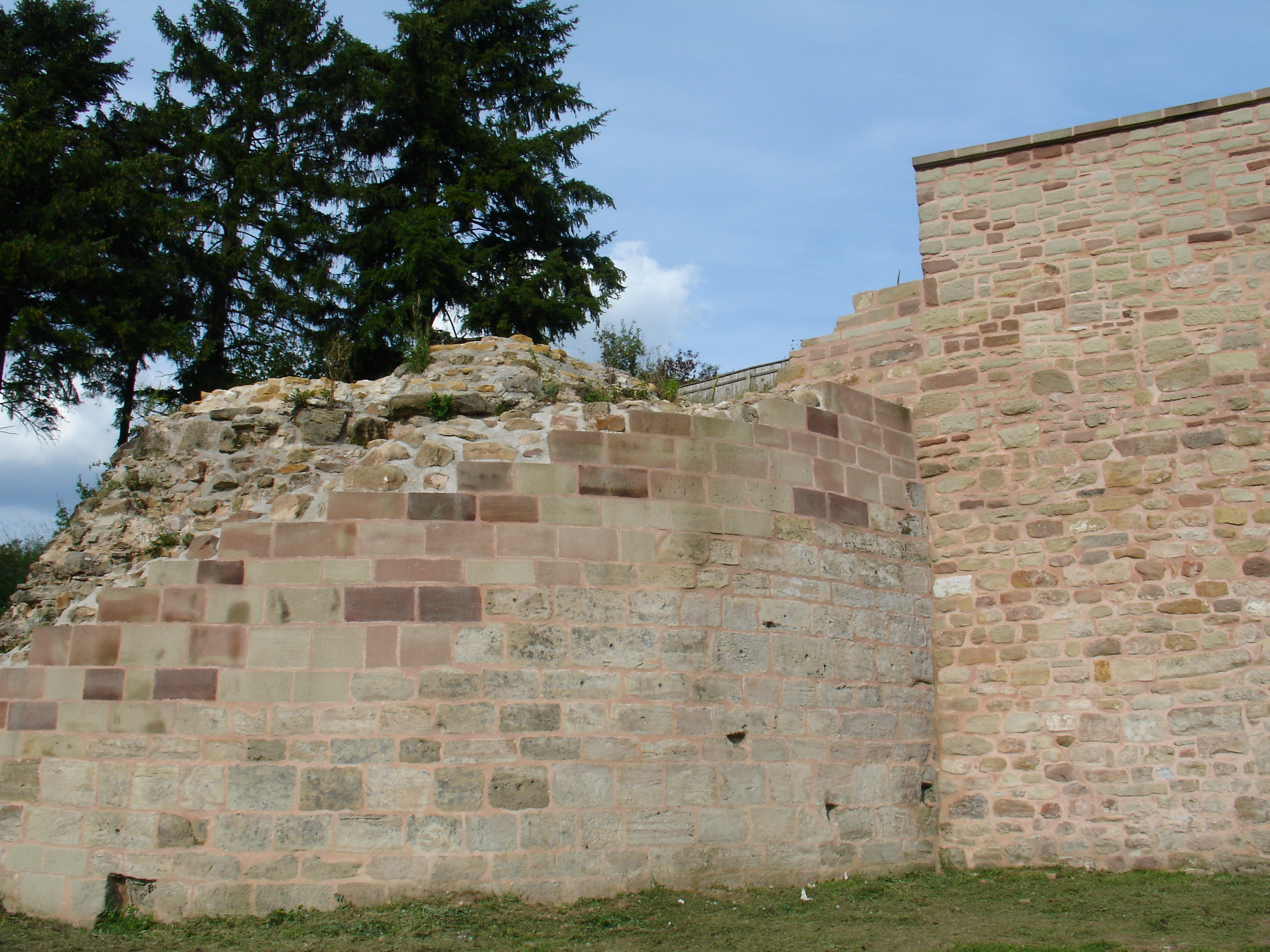
Ruins of the medieval castle

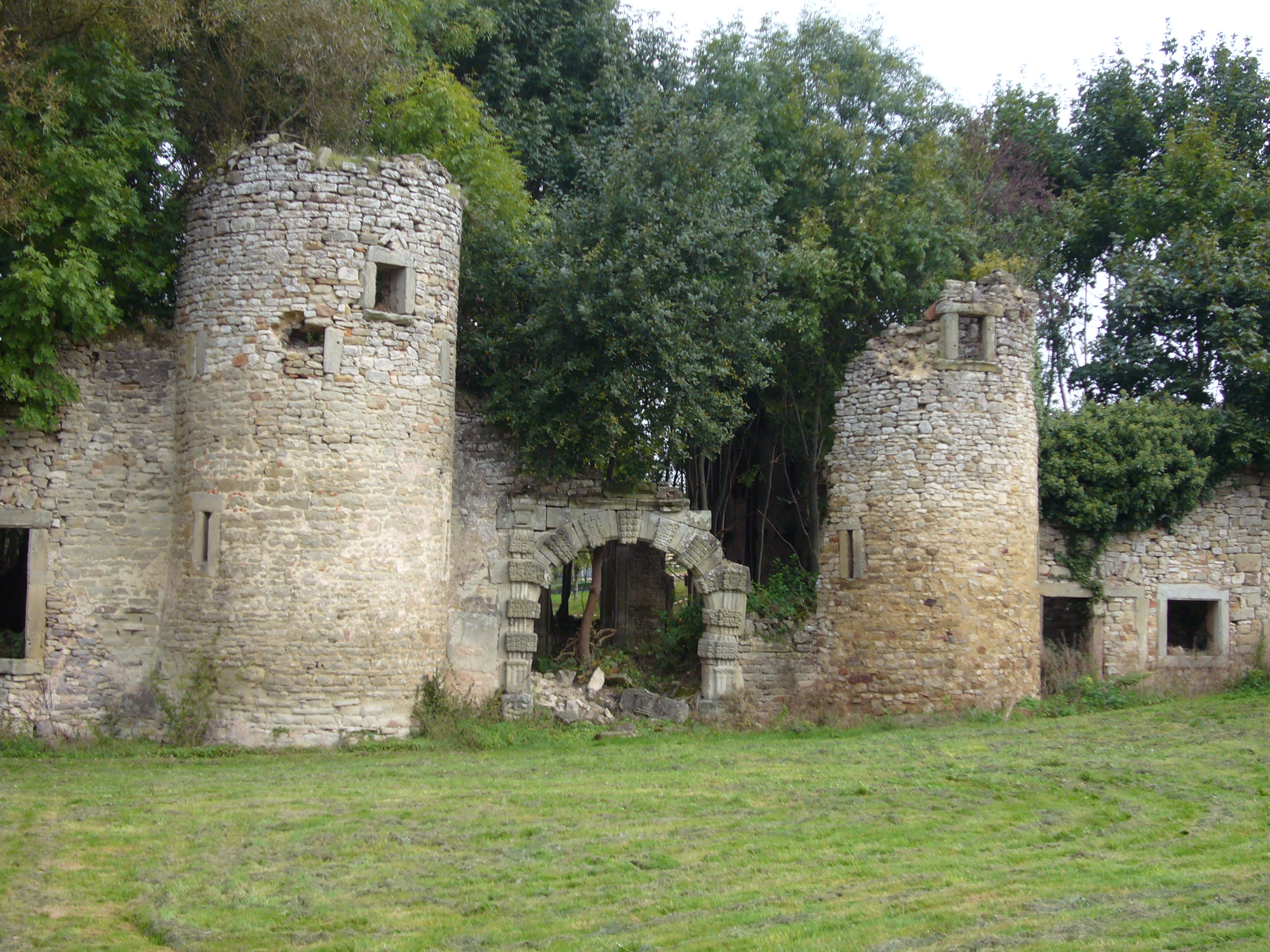
Ruins of the castle of Hellering

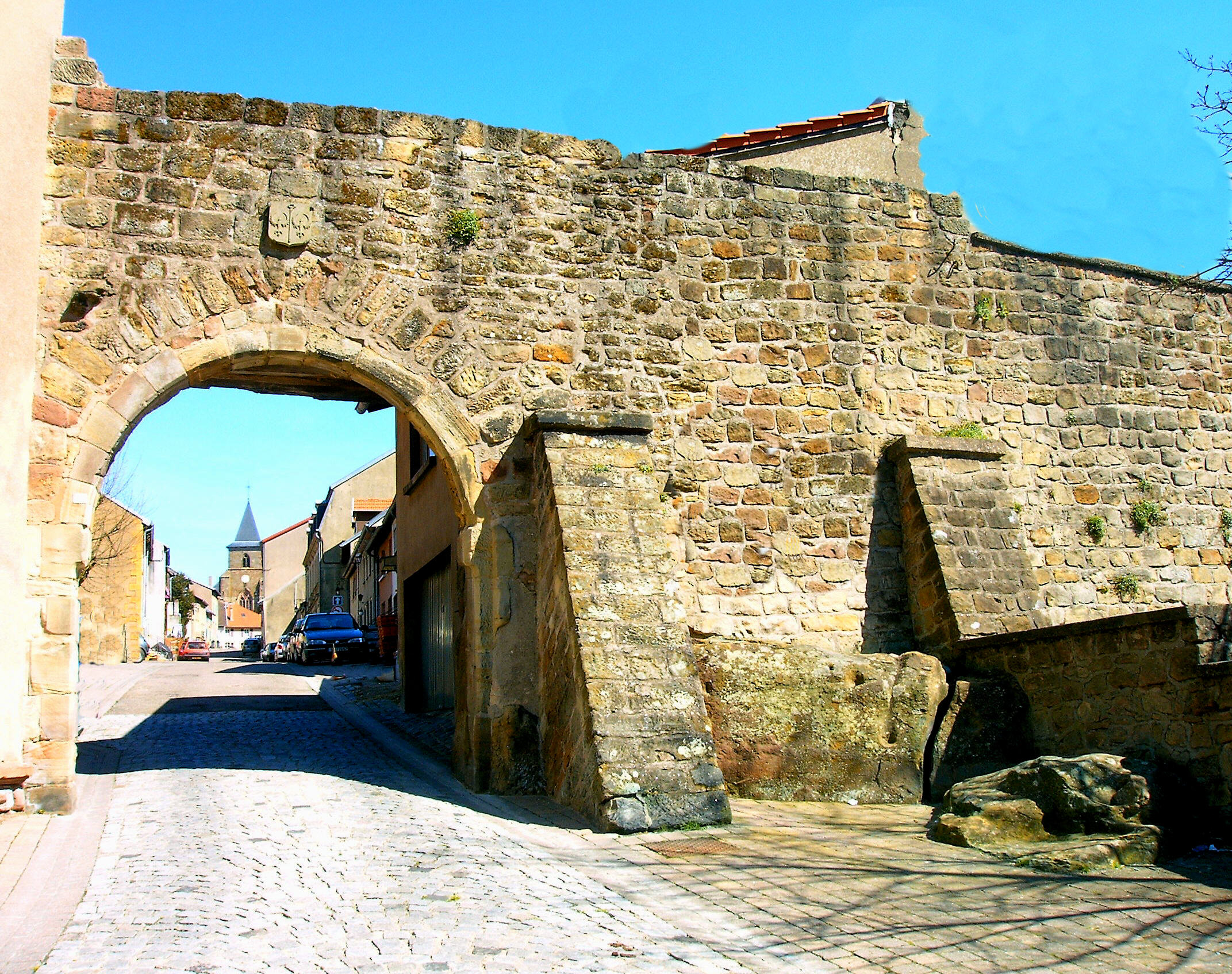
La Vieilie Porte

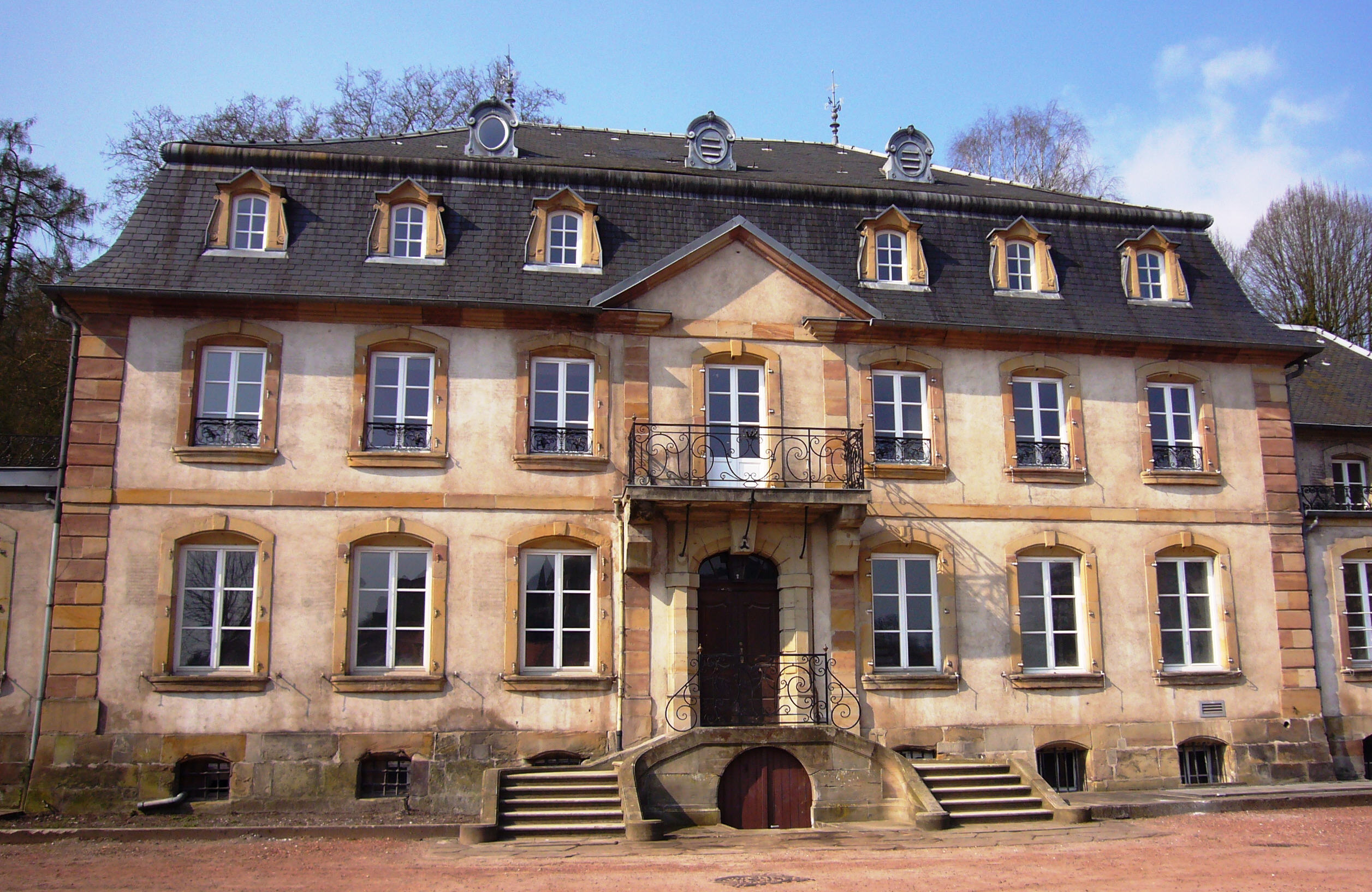
The Château d’Hausen

=== Religious sites ===
- Collégiale Saint-Étienne (13th-14th centuries). The church is registered as French national heritage site.
- Saint Catherine's chapel, in the Gothic style (13th century), is listed as French national heritage site.
- the Recollect convent (18th century)
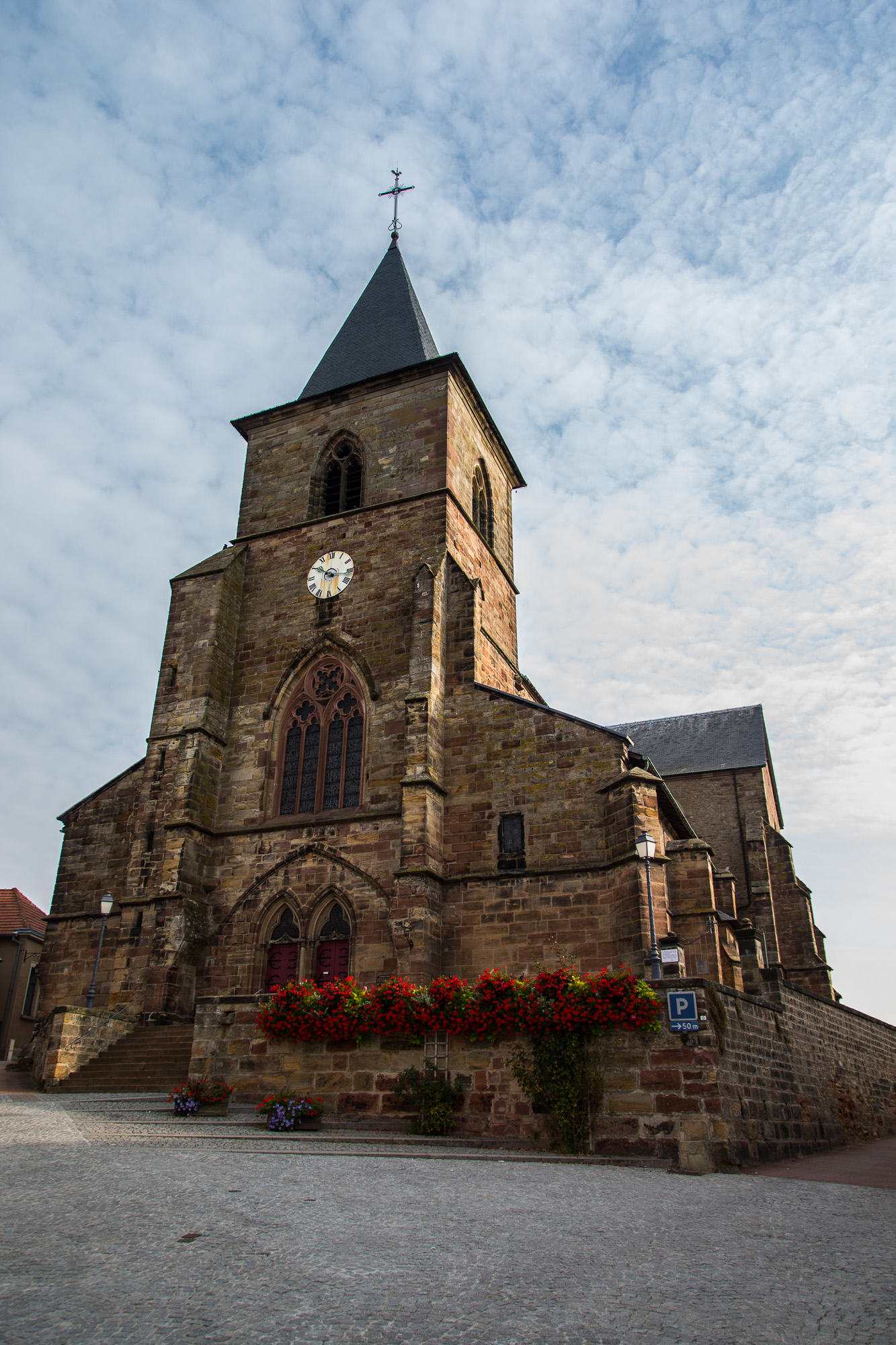
The collegiate church of Saint Stephen

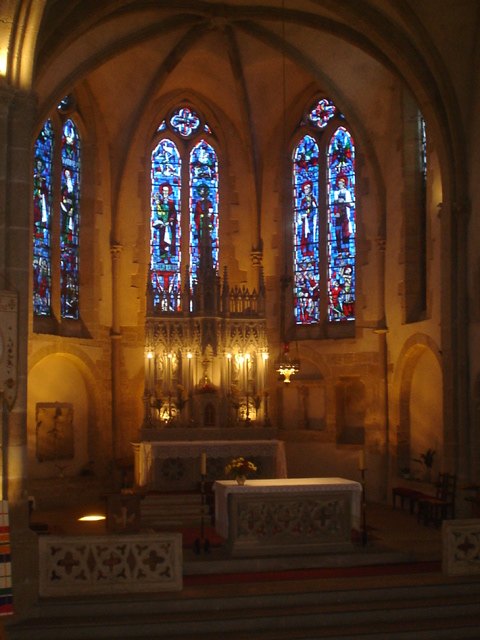
Gothic quire of the collegiate church of Saint Stephen

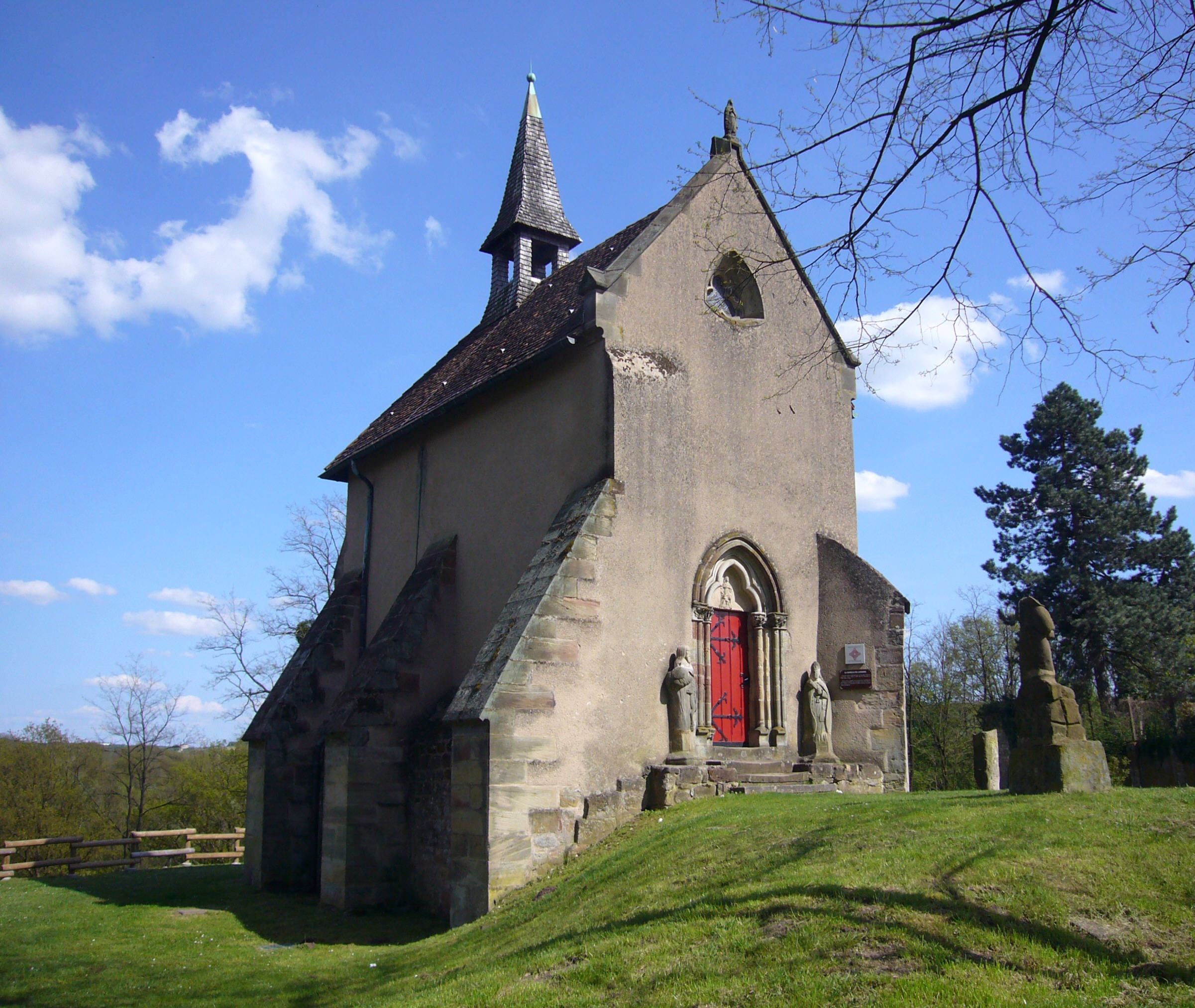
Saint Catherine's chapel

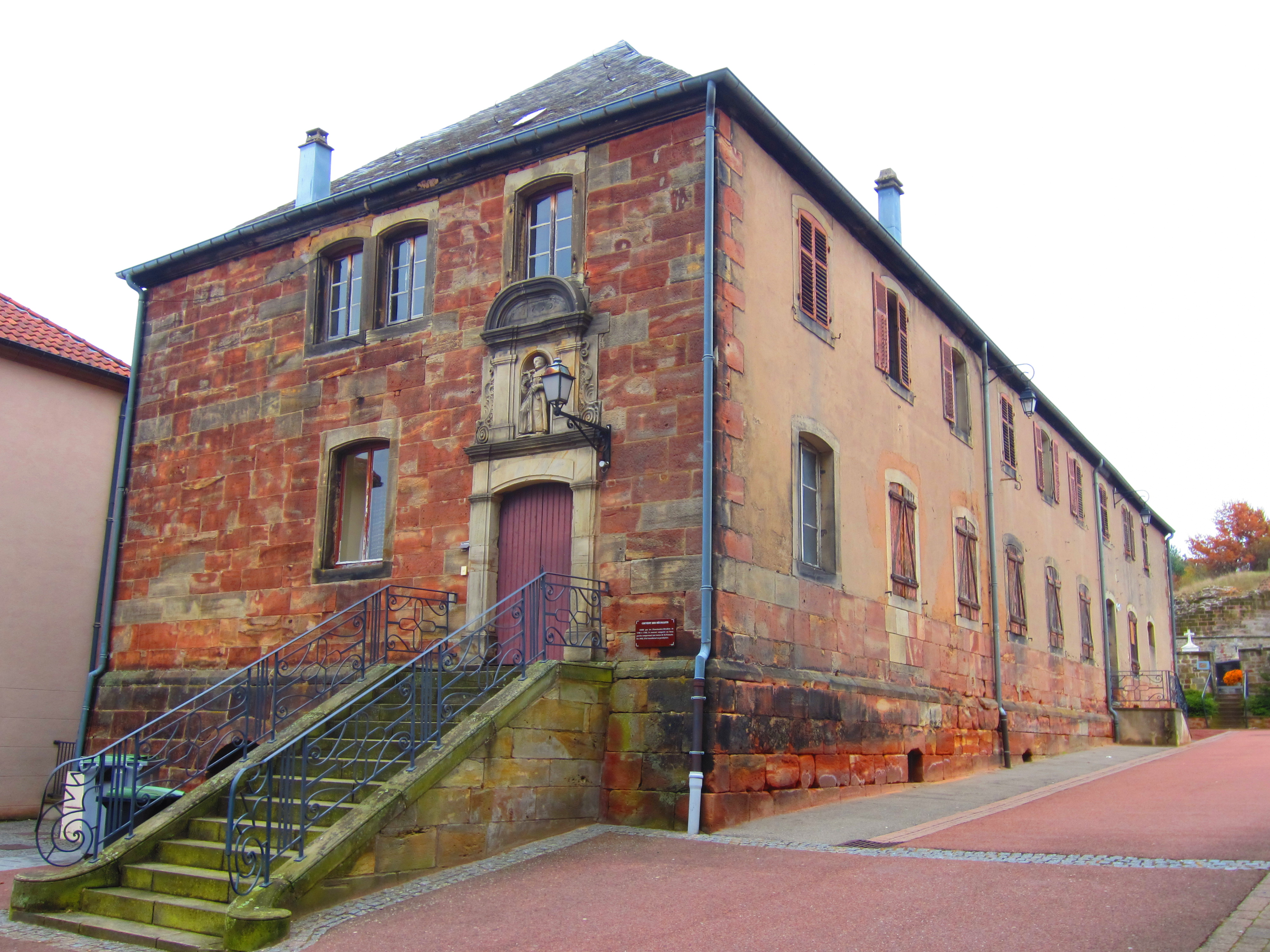
The Recollect convent

=== Cultural events ===
- the Théodore Gouvy International Festival has taken place every year since 1989.
- the Carnival celebrations culminate each year with a very popular and colored parade.
- the city is home to the Choeur d'hommes de Hombourg-Haut, one of the oldest male voice choir in the region Lorraine, founded in 1865.

== Twin town ==
San Giorgio di Pesaro, Italy

== Notable people ==
Théodore Gouvy (1819-1898) composer
