= Johann Michael Zächer =

Austrian composer

Johann Michael Zächer (1649 – 30 September 1712) was an Austrian composer.

Zächer was born in Vienna. He was Domkapellmeister of St. Stephen's Cathedral, Vienna from 1679 and Kapellmeister to Eleonor Magdalene of Neuburg the dowager empress on the death of Leopold I, Holy Roman Emperor in 1705.

== Works, editions and recordings ==
- Die Heldenmüthige Judith in einem teutschen Oratorio (1704)
- Vespers in Vienna. Pierre Cao
