= Johann Melchior Gletle =

Johann Melchior Gletle (July 1626 – 6 September 1683) was a Swiss organist, Kapellmeister and composer.

== Life ==
Gletle was born in Bremgarten. He was a prolific composer of church music - masses, psalms, motets, and also several pieces for the tromba marina. He died, aged 57, in Augsburg.

== Works, editions and recordings ==
=== Works ===
- Motetta Sacra concertata, Op. 1 (1667)
- 36 Trompeter-Stückle (1675), edited by Christian Blümel (Leverkusen: Mark Tezak, 1985)
- Beatus Vir (Psalm 111) (1676/1677) (Ammerbuch: C. Hofius, 2010)
- Expeditio musicae, classis IV, Op. 5 (1677)
  - Cantate Domino, motet for soprano, tenor, 2 violins, 2 violas, Cello and continuo, edited by Eberhard Hofmann (Ditzingen: Edition Musica Rinata, 2005)
  - O wie ein so rauhe Krippen (Vilsbiburg: Musica pretiosa, 1996)
  - Puellule decore, pastorella (Magdeburg: Edition Walhall, 2005)
- Litaneien op. 6 (1681)
- Marienvesper
- O benignissime Jesu, motet (Strasbourg: Les Cahiers De Tourdion, 2001)

=== Recordings ===
- Vespers in Vienna. Pierre Cao
- Complete Motets Op. 5 4CD Daniela Dolci
  - Celebremus Cum Gaudio Motets Op. 5 and Op. 1
  - Triomphale Canticum Motets Op. 5 and Op. 1
