= Collegiate Church of Saint-Étienne (Hombourg-Haut) =

Coordinates: 49.1268°N 6.7803°E

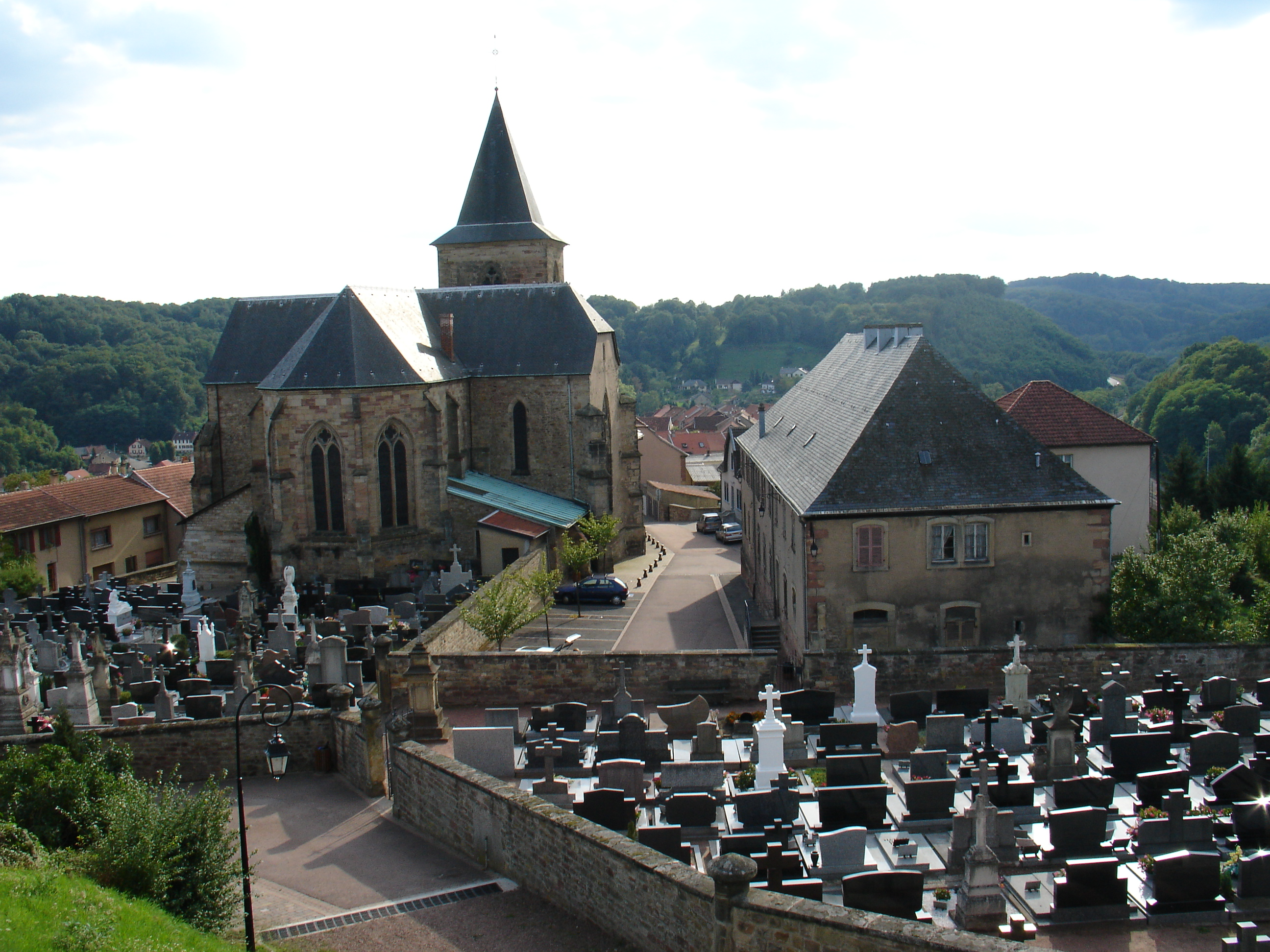
Collegiate church.

The Collégiale Saint-Étienne (Collegiate Church of St. Stephen) is a Gothic building in Hombourg-Haut, department of Moselle, in the cultural and historical region Lorraine, Grand Est.

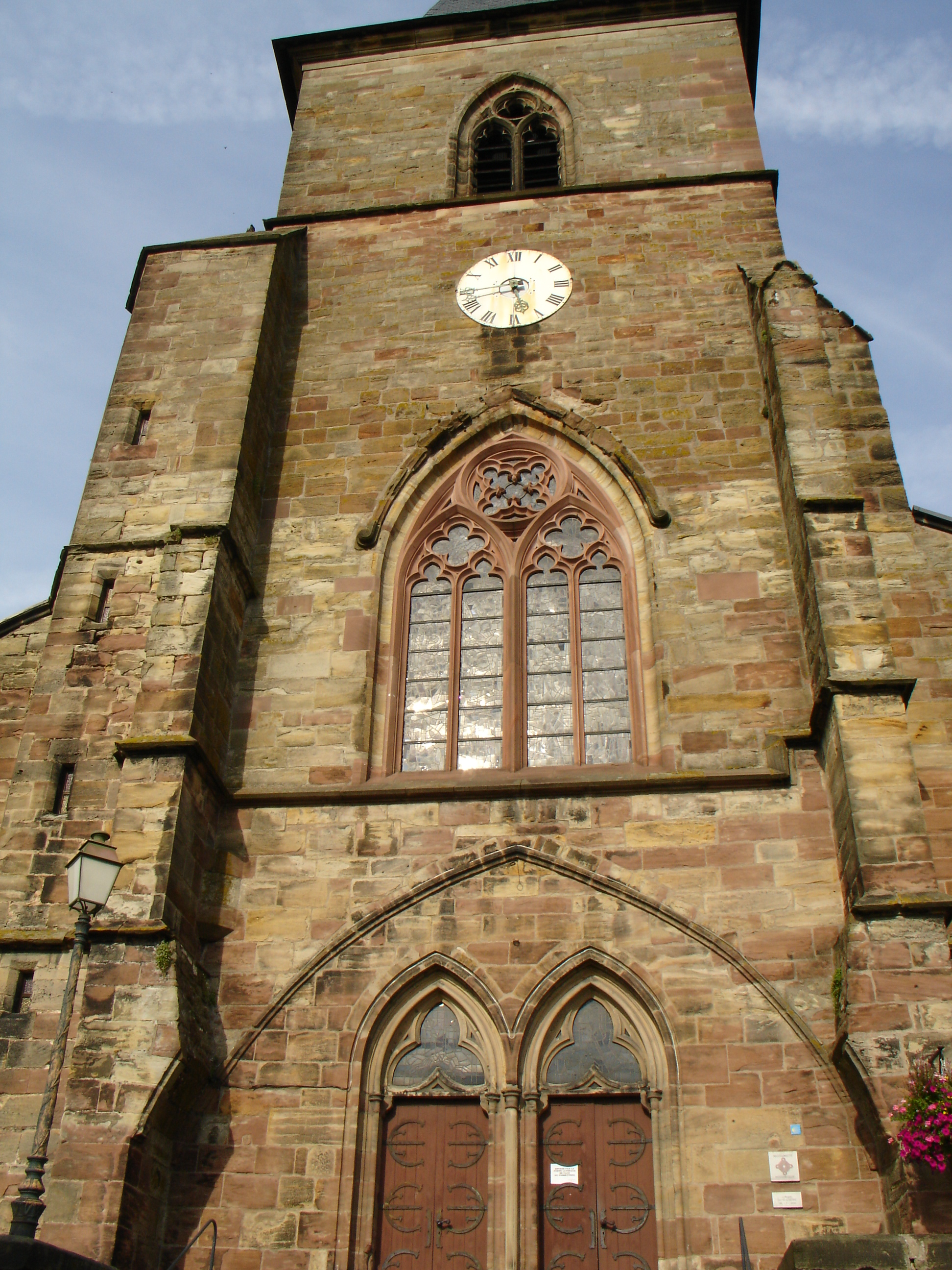
Collegiate church.

== History ==
After the establishment of the Chapter of the collegiate by James of Lorraine, bishop of Metz in 1254, the church was erected during the 13th-14th centuries. It probably replaced an earlier church.

Although it was damaged by a fire in 1632, it was spared from destruction during the Thirty Years War and the 1789 revolution.

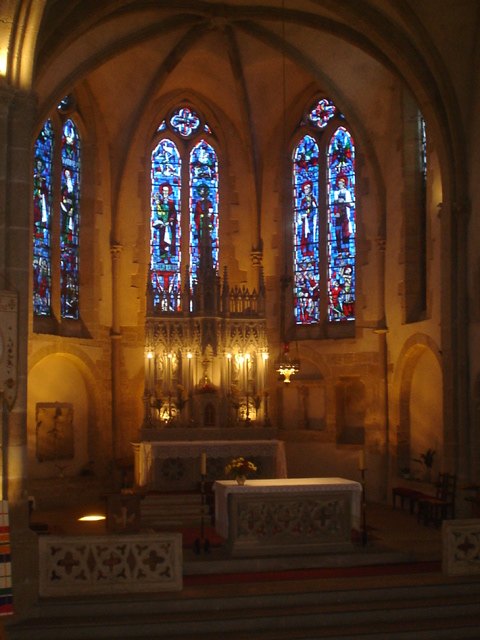
Stained glass Windows of the gothic quire.

== Cultural value ==
The church is registered as a French national heritage site and has become the symbol of the city of Hombourg-Haut.

1847 a new organ was installed by Pierre Rivinach. In 1906 the instrument was extended by the Dalstein-Haerpfer company. In 1992 it was restored by the organ builder Michel Gaillard (Aubertin).

The stained glass windows include works by the 20th century master glass maker Jean-Henri Couturat, second 1925 Prix de Rome.

From the fifteens onwards the collegiate church served as a major venue for the classical music concerts in Hombourg-Haut. The Saint-Cecilia choir is the official choir of the church and sings the masses. It also gives concerts. The Friends of the organ (non-profit association) regularly organises concerts as well as the Choeur d'hommes de Hombourg-Haut, the oldest male choir in the region Lorraine. Most of the concerts of the Théodore Gouvy international Festival take place in the Gothic building.

== See also ==
- Théodore Gouvy International Festival
