= Samuel Capricornus =

Czech composer

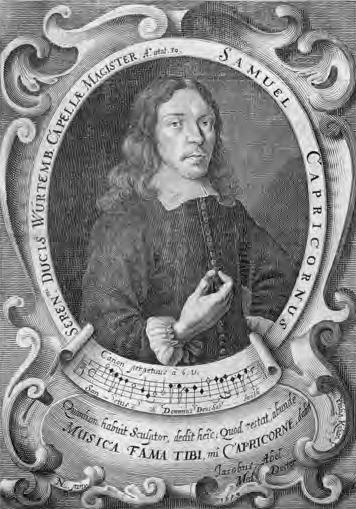
Samuel Capricornus Portrait

Samuel Friedrich Capricornus (born Samuel Friedrich Bockshorn; 21 December 1628 – 10 November 1665) was a composer of the Baroque period from Bohemia.

== Life ==
Samuel Friedrich Capricornus was born on 21 December 1628 in Žerčice. Capricornus' father was a Protestant minister, who fled with his family for fear of the Counter-Reformation to Bratislava in the then Kingdom of Hungary. After completing high school in Sopron, he studied languages and theology in Silesia before becoming a musician at the imperial court in Vienna. Here, he became acquainted with the music of Giovanni Valentini and Antonio Bertali. After a short stay in Reutlingen he worked for two years as a private music teacher in Bratislava and then from 1651 to 1657 he was active as a music director in various churches and as a music teacher at a high school there.

In May 1657 he became Kapellmeister in Stuttgart and soon became engaged in a bitter dispute with the organist of the collegiate church, Philipp Friedrich Böddecker, who had himself coveted the position, and his brother David, a cornetto player. Already in September 1657, David Böddecker had complained about a "high and difficult piece" which he had been asked to play by Capricornus and that he also had to play the "Quart-Zink" (a small, high pitched cornetto) and sing, which were not part of his job requirements. In his defense against these allegations, Capricornus complained about the unruliness, and the "gluttony and drunkenness" of the musicians in the kapell, also saying the cornetto players played their instruments like a cow horn.

Capricornus remained in this post until his death in 1665. He died on 10 November 1665 in Stuttgart, at the age of 36.

== Works (selection) ==
Verzeichnis der erhaltenen Werke von Samuel Capricornus CWV Cornetto-Verlag 2016

=== Published works ===
- Opus musicum, Christoff Gerhard, Nürnberg 1655; Cornetto-Verlag, Stuttgart (facsimile)
- Geistliche Concerten, Endter, Nürnberg 1658; Cornetto-Verlag, Stuttgart (facsimile)
- Erster Theil Geistlicher Harmonien, Johann Weyrich Rösslin, Stuttgart 1659
- Ander Theil Geistlicher Harmonien, Johann Weyrich Rösslin, Stuttgart 1660
  - Das ist meine Freude, Berliner Chormusik-Verlag/Edition Musica Rinata, Ditzingen 2000
  - Ich habe den Herrn, Cornetto-Verlag, Stuttgart 2004
- Sonaten und Canzonen mit 3. Instrumenten, Author & Christoph Gerhard, Nürnberg 1660
- 'Zwey Lieder von dem Leyden und Sterben Jesu for 2 sopranos, 4 viols (ad lib.) and b.c., Christoff Gerhard, Nürnberg 1660; Cornetto-Verlag, Stuttgart (facsimile). First edition available at IMSLP.
  - Ein Lämmlein
  - O Traurigkeit!
- Jubilus Bernhardi for SSATB, 4 Viols and B.c., Endter, Nürnberg 1660; Strube Verlag, Berlin 2003. First edition available at IMSLP.
  - Jesus dulcis memoria
  - Jesu spes poenitentibus
  - Jesu dulcedo Cordium
  - Jesum quaeram in lectulo
  - Cum Maria Diluculo
  - Jesu Rex admirabilis
  - Mane nobiscum Domine
  - Amor Jesu dulcissimus
  - Jesum omnes agnoscite
  - Jesus autor clementiae
  - Jesus mi bone sentiam
  - Tua Jesu dilectio
  - Jesu Decus Angelicum
  - Amor tuus continuus
  - Jesu summa benignitas
  - O Jesu mi dulcissime
  - Jesus cum sic diligitur
  - O beatum incendium
  - Jesu Flos matris Virginis
  - Jesu sole serenior
  - Mi dilecte reverete
  - Coeli cives occurrite
  - Rex virtutum
  - Jesus in pace imperat
- Geistliche Harmonien Teil 3
- Dritter Theil Geistlicher Harmonien, Johann Weyrich Rösslin, Stuttgart 1664
  - Es stehe Gott auf, Edition Musica Rinata, Ditzingen 2002
  - Ich bin schwarz, aber gar lieblich, Carus-Verlag, Leinfelden-Echterdingen 1998
  - Ich weiss, dass der Herr Gott ist, Edition Musica Rinata, Ditzingen 2000
  - Singet Gott, lobsinget seinem Namen, Edition Musica Rinata, Ditzingen 2003
- Geistlicher Concerten ander Theil, Stuttgart 1665; Cornetto-Verlag, Stuttgart (facsimile)
  - Also hat Gott
  - Ich halte es dafür
  - Selig ist der Mann
  - Ihr Lieben
  - Ich freue mich
  - Herr! warumb trittest
  - Kommt her zu mir
  - Daran ist erschienen
  - Gott hat uns nicht gesetzt
  - Unser Wandel
  - Ich bin der Weg
  - Es hat kein Aug
- Theatrum musicum, Bencard, Würzburg 1669; Cornetto-Verlag, Stuttgart (facsimile)
- Continutiatio theatri musici, Bencard, Würzburg 1669. First edition available at IMSLP.
  - Jesu benigne
  - Omnis caro foenum
  - O jesu summa charitas
  - Judicium Salomonis
  - Domine labia me
  - Adesto mutitudo
  - Salvum me fac Deus
  - Laudate pueri
- Scelta musicale, Ammon, Frankfurt 1669; Cornetto-Verlag, Stuttgart (facsimile). First edition available at IMSLP.
  - Jesu nostra Redemptio
  - Adeste omnes fideles, Edition Musica Poetica, St. Peter-Ording 2008
  - Surrexit pastor bonus, Edition Musica Poetica, St. Peter-Ording 2008
  - Laudate Dominum
  - Bonum est confiteri
  - Laetare in Domino
- Opus aureum missarum, Bencard, Frankfurt 1670; Cornetto-Verlag, Stuttgart (facsimile). First edition available at IMSLP.
  - Missa primi Toni à 6
  - Missa secundi Toni à 10
  - Kyrie & Gloria tertii Toni à 12
  - Kyrie & Gloria quarti Toni à 6
- Tafelmusik, Bencard, Frankfurt 1670; Cornetto-Verlag, Stuttgart (facsimile and modern edition)
- Continuatio der Tafelmusik 1671; Cornetto-Verlag, Stuttgart (facsimile and modern edition)
- Prothimia Suavissima 1672. The entire collection was published as a work by Bertali, however several Sonatas in part two are known to be by Capricornus.

=== Other works ===
- Audio Domini Deus meus, Cornetto-Verlag, Stuttgart 2008
- Beati immaculati in via, Manuscript, 1690; Cornetto-Verlag, Stuttgart 2008
- Ciacona for violin, viola da gamba and B.c., in Partiturbuch Ludwig, Manuscript 1662; Cornetto-Verlag, Stuttgart 2006
- Deus docuisti me, Cornetto-Verlag, Stuttgart 2003
- Jauchzet dem Herrn, Cornetto-Verlag, Stuttgart 2004
- Magnificat for voices (SSATB), 2 violins and b.c.
- Mass in F for SATB, 2 violins and B.c., Cornetto-Verlag, Stuttgart 2003
- Quae fata spes vè fingo?, Cornetto-Verlag, Stuttgart
- Quis dabit capiti meo aquam, Cornetto-Verlag, Stuttgart 2008
- Raptus Proserpinae, Opera, Cornetto-Verlag, Stuttgart (facsimile of libretto)
- Sonata in E minor for violin and b.c. Cornetto-Verlag, Stuttgart (modern edition)
- Sonata à 8 in A minor for 3 violins, 2 violas, 2 violas da gamba, viola di basso and b.c., Manuscript 1667
- Willkommen, edles Knäblein, Edition Musica Rinata, Ditzingen 2000

== Recordings ==
- Jesu nostra Redemptio (from Scelta musicale), Hana Blažíková, CordArte, Pan Classics (CD, 2013).
- Theatrum Musicum & Leçons de Ténèbres, Benoit Haller, La Chapelle Rhénane, K617 (CD, 2016).
- Dulcis amor, Jesu (from Geistliche Harmonien, III, 1664) Harry van der Kamp, Laurie Reviol. Ensemble Tirami Su, Challenge Classics (CD, 2002)
- Theatrum Musicum, Martin Gester, Le Parlement De Musique, Opus 111 (CD, 1994)
