= Maria Bengtsson (soprano) =

Swedish operatic soprano (born 1975)

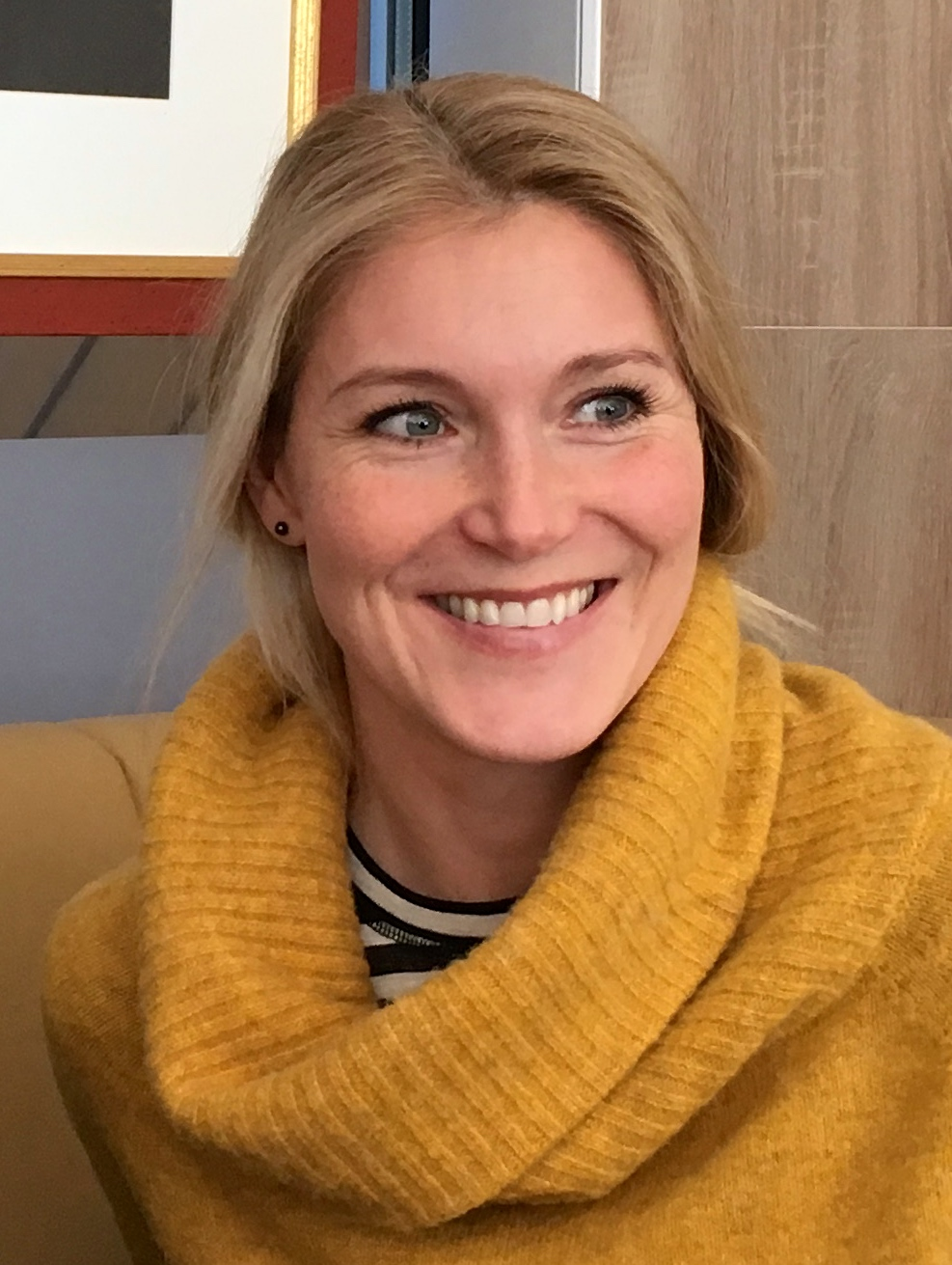
- Bengtsson in 2018
- Born: 7 May 1975 (age 50); Trelleborg, Sweden
- Education: Musikhochschule Freiburg
- Occupation: Operatic soprano
- Organizations: Volksoper Wien; Komische Oper Berlin
- Website: www.mariabengtsson.com

Maria Bengtsson (born 7 May 1975) is a Swedish operatic soprano, who has appeared in major opera houses in Europe. She is known for roles in operas by Mozart and Richard Strauss.

== Career ==
Born in Trelleborg, Sweden, Bengtsson grew up in Höllviken, taking piano lessons and singing in choirs. She studied voice from 1995 to 2000 with Beata Heuer-Christen at the Musikhochschule Freiburg. She was a member of the Wiener Volksoper from 2000. In 2002, Kirill Petrenko engaged her at the Komische Oper Berlin, where she stayed to 2007. She appeared there as Konstanze in Mozart's Die Entführung aus dem Serail, staged by Calixto Bieito in a provoking way.

She made her debut at the Royal Opera House in London as Lauretta in Puccini's Gianni Schicchi. She has also performed at the Opéra Bastille in Paris, the Bavarian State Opera and the Staatsoper Berlin, among others. She has collaborated with conductors such as Daniel Barenboim, Bertrand de Billy, Marc Minkowski, Antonio Pappano, Philippe Jordan and Vladimir Jurowski, and with stage directors such as Peter Konwitschny, Jonathan Miller and Hans Neuenfels.

Among her roles are characters in operas by Mozart: Elettra in Idomeneo, Fiordiligi in Così fan tutte, Donna Anna in Don Giovanni, and the Countess in Le nozze di Figaro. She specializes in roles by Richard Strauss: the title role in Daphne, the Marschallin in Der Rosenkavalier, the Countess in Capriccio, and the title role of Arabella, a role which she performed first at the Oper Frankfurt in 2017, and performed at the Internationale Maifestspiele Wiesbaden, directed by Uwe Eric Laufenberg and conducted by Patrick Lange. Gerard Hoffmann from Vienna said about the Frankfurt performance that Bengtsson is the quintessential Strauss interpreter, credible and expressive, with "perfect diction and graceful acting". He described her voice as "flexible, warm, rich in colours and nuances, with a slender middle range and splendid piano".

In concert, she sang the soprano part in Mendelssohn's Lobgesang for the opening of the Elbphilharmonie in 2017, conducted by Thomas Hengelbrock.

She sang Ellen Orford in Britten's Peter Grimes at The Royal Opera House in May 2026.
