= Salomé Haller =

French operatic and concert soprano

- Born: 11 April 1975 (age 51); Strasbourg
- Origin: France
- Occupations: Operatic and Concert soprano

Salomé Haller (born 11 April 1975) is a French operatic and concert soprano.

== Life ==
Born in Strasbourg, Haller began her vocal training in her hometown and completed it at the Conservatoire de Paris. Since the beginning of the 2000s, she has made successful appearances as a singer.
