= Clemens Morgenthaler =

German bass baritone

Clemens Morgenthaler (born 1973) is a German operatic bass-baritone.

== Life ==
Morgenthaler was born in Wertheim am Main. After graduating from high school, he studied church music and singing at the Musikhochschule Freiburg. He completed his subsequent postgraduate studies at the City of Basel Music Academy in the concert class of Kurt Widmer and with Gerard Wyss (Lied class) in 2003. He attended master classes with Andreas Schmidt, Ulf Bästlein, Charles Spencer and Rudolf Piernay, among others.

His repertoire includes literature from early baroque music to modern.

Opera engagements, world premieres, CD, television and radio recordings (DLF, SWR, DRS, ORF) as well as numerous concerts at home and abroad, where he worked with renowned conductors, directors, orchestras, choirs and pianists, document his artistic activities. Concert tours have taken him to almost all European countries. He has sung in numerous cathedrals as well as in concert halls such as the Berlin Philharmonic, the Konzerthaus Berlin, the Festspielhaus Bregenz, the Philharmonic in Krakow or the Liederhalle Stuttgart.

Clemens Foundation and prize winner at the song art competition, Husum. In 2008 he won 1st prize in the PodiumJungerGesangsSolisten competition. In Rome he was awarded 2nd prize and the special prize "Oratorio" at the International Singing Competition "Musica Sacra" in 2008.

Since 2004, he has been teaching singing at the Staatliche Hochschule für Musik Trossingen. Musik Morgenthaler has been Professor of Singing at the Vorarlberg State Conservatory Feldkirch since 2010.
