= Pierre Cao =

Luxembourgish composer and conductor (1937–2026)

Pierre Cao (22 December 1937 – 14 May 2026) was a Luxembourgish composer and conductor.

== Background ==
Pierre Cao was born in Dudelange on 22 December 1937. He studied composition and conducting at the Royal Conservatory of Brussels. Cao died in May 2026, at the age of 88.

== Classical music ==
Cao was the regular conductor of Arsys Bourgogne, with whom he recorded Biber's Requiem and other baroque works. He taught at the Luxembourg Conservatoire until 1998 and led various vocal ensembles in Luxembourg and the surrounding region. Cao was a co-founder of the Institut Européen du Chant Choral (INECC).

== Eurovision ==
Cao was the musical director for both the 1973 and 1984 Eurovision Song Contests, staged in the Grand Duchy at the Nouveau Théâtre. He conducted Luxembourg's winning song "Tu te reconnaîtras" in 1973. Unusually, he did not conduct Luxembourg's entry in 1984 (it was conducted by Pascal Stive), despite being the show's musical director. He did however conduct the German and Cypriot entries.

== Selected discography ==
- Liszt – piano concertos. Orchestre Symphonique de la Radio-Télé Luxembourg de France.
- Giovanni Felice Sances, Johann Michael Zächer & Johann Melchior Gletle – Vespers in Vienna. Ambroisie.
- Bach – Motets Les Basses Réunies. Ambroisie 2006
- Michael Haydn – Missa Sancti Hieronymi MH 254 & Georg Druschetzky Messe en si bémol majeur. Johannette Zomer, Guy de Mey et Britta Schwarz. Festival d'Ambronay 2007
- Théodore Gouvy – Electre, opus 85 – scène dramatique pour solistes, choeur et orchestre. François Pollet, Michael Myers, Marcel Vanaud, Cécile Eloir. Choeurs et Orchestre Symphonique de Nancy. (2CD) K617 1999

Media offices
Preceded by (United Kingdom) Malcolm Lockyer	Eurovision Song Contest conductor 1973	Succeeded by (United Kingdom) Ronnie Hazlehurst
Preceded by (West Germany) Dieter Reith	Eurovision Song Contest conductor 1984	Succeeded by (Sweden) Curt-Eric Holmquist
