= La Chapelle Rhénane =

- Baroque music ensemble
- Founded: 2001
- Location: Strasbourg
- Principal conductor: Benoît Haller
- Website: www.chapelle-rhenane.com

La Chapelle Rhénane is a French baroque musical ensemble conducted by Benoît Haller, also a soloist in the ensemble.

== History ==
Founded in 2001 by tenor Benoît Haller, La Chapelle Rhénane is a musical ensemble of lyrical and instrumental soloists. The team is dedicated to the repertoire of great European vocal works. Its ambition is, through concerts and recordings, to reveal in these works the emotion, humanity and modernity that can seduce a wide contemporary audience. Just like the great European courts during the Baroque period who recruited their musicians across the continent – and to a lesser extent like the composers who never ceased to travel to complete their training and gain new experiences - la Chapelle Rhénane benefits from the central location of Strasbourg, attracting musicians from all over Europe.

Since its start in 2003, the activity of la Chapelle Rhénane has been intimately linked to the work of Heinrich Schütz. It is through this composer that the ensemble forged its unique sound and deep human bonds. Subsequently, the ensemble began to play the music of Johann Sebastian Bach, in particular through the creation of the St John Passion - whose outcome was the release of the recording by the end of March 2010 under the label ZigZag Territories - and the creation of the St Matthew Passion in 2009. The Christmas Oratorio followed those ambitious projects in fall 2010.

Since 2007, la Chapelle Rhénane performed in some of the best known French stages, such as the Cité de la Musique in Paris, the Arsenal de Metz or festivals like, Sarrebourg, Sablé sur Sarthe, St. Riquier, Festival de musique de La Chaise-Dieu, Sinfonia in Périgord, Ars Cameralis Katowice (Poland), The Mad Day of Nantes, Regensburg Tage Alter Musik (Germany).

La Chapelle Rhénane is supported by the Ministry of Culture and Communication - DRAC Grand Est, Grand Est Region and the City of Strasbourg. Other partners include the Orange Foundation, the Foundation Royaumont - Voice Center and Les Gémeaux - Scène Nationale de Sceaux (direction Françoise Letellier).

== Recordings ==
Six discs of la Chapelle Rhénane have been released under the label K617: In addition to an album dedicated to the "Theatrum Musicum and Lessons of Darkness" by Samuel Capricornus, four were devoted to Heinrich Schütz: "Second Book of Symphoniæ Sacræ" in 2004, "Uppsala Magnificat and other sacred works" in 2006, "History of Resurrection & Musikalische Exequien" in 2007 and finally Psalmen Davids in 2012. All these recordings have been enthusiastically received by the press, collecting a total of four "Diapason d'Or", a "Diapason d'Or of the Year" in 2007, two "10 de Répertoire", a "Shock the World of Music "and an "Editor's Choice in Gramophone."

In April 2008 appeared the cycle "Membra Nostri Jesu" by Dietrich Buxtehude, the first live recording of the Chapel with the Maîtrise de Garçons de Colmar (direction Arlette Steyer). The disc received the "Orphée d'or" for best recording of sacred music by the Académie du Disque Lyrique.

- 2004 : Symphoniæ Sacræ • extraits du deuxième Livre (1647) - Heinrich Schütz
- 2006 : Theatrum Musicum & Leçons de Ténèbres - Samuel Capricornus
- 2006 : Magnificat d'Uppsala et autres œuvres sacrées - Heinrich Schütz
- 2007 : Histoire de la Résurrection & Musikalische Exequien - Heinrich Schütz
- 2008 : Membra Jesu Nostri - Dietrich Buxtehude
- 2010 : Passio secundum Johannem - Johann Sebastian Bach
- 2012 : Psalmen Davids • extraits du recueil de 1619 - Heinrich Schütz
- 2013 : MESSIAH - Georg Friedrich Händel
