= K617 =

French classical music record label

K617 is a French classical music record label based in Metz and founded by Alain Pacquier, music author and creator of the Festival de Saintes at the Abbaye aux Dames in Charente-Maritime, and the Festival de Sarrebourg (July) at the Couvent de Saint Ulrich. The name "K617" refers to Mozart's Adagio and Rondo for glass harmonica, flute, oboe, viola and cello, K.617).

== Recording ==
=== les Chemins du Baroque ===
The activity for which the label was initially most noted relates to a project of Pacquier's, les Chemins du Baroque, exploration of Latin-America's baroque musical heritage. Pacquier's second book Le retour des caravelles recounts the story of 20 years of exploration of Latin-American baroque music.

=== Mémoire musicale de Lorraine ===
A second strand of K617's activity relates to music of Lorraine. This series has recovered various forgotten works of Théodore Gouvy (1819-1898): Requiem, Stabat Mater, dramatic cantatas (Elektra, Egill) and chamber music (string quartets and works for wind ensembles).

=== Other early music ===
The label has also branched out in a variety of more and less conventional early music and classical recordings. The "travels" of K617 extend to Poland, Marcin Mielczewski, and Jesuit missions in China, Jean Joseph Marie Amiot.

== Artists ==
- Gabriel Garrido - Latin American baroque
- Jean-Claude Malgoire - Mozart and classical
- La Chapelle Rhénane, direction fr:Benoît Haller - the works of Heinrich Schütz
- Ensemble Lucidarium, direction fr:Avery Gosfield, Francis Biggi - Medieval and Renaissance Music
