= Théodore Gouvy =

French/German composer

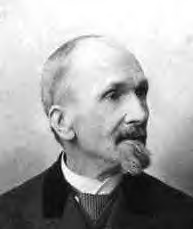
Louis Théodore Gouvy

Louis Théodore Gouvy (3 July 1819 – 21 April 1898) was a French/German composer.

== Biography ==
Gouvy was born into a French-speaking family in Goffontaine, now of Saarbrücken-Schafbrücke, Germany. The family was of Belgian descent. Gouvy's great-grandfather Pierre came from Goffontaine, a Belgian village near Liège. Around 1753, being mayor of Saarlouis, he named his ironworks factory "Goffontaine". Because this region fell under Prussian control shortly before his birth, Théodore Gouvy could not attain French citizenship until the age of 32.

He began piano lessons with a private tutor at the age of eight, and was educated in Sarreguemines (France), developing a keen interest in Classical Greek culture and in modern languages. He spoke not only German and French, but English and Italian as well. In 1837, he went to Paris to study law, continuing his piano lessons with a pupil of the pianist and composer Henri Herz (1803–1888) and became friendly with Adolphe Adam. This led to further music studies in Paris and Berlin. Unable to pursue music instruction at the Conservatoire de Paris, he took up private courses.

Drawn toward instrumental music rather than opera, Gouvy chose to live the last third of his life almost entirely in Germany where he felt more appreciated. In particular, he wrote twenty-four compositions for full orchestra, including nine symphonies, as well as overtures and variations. Chamber music comprises a large portion of Gouvy's work and accounts in particular for four sonatas in duet form, five trios, eleven quartets, seven quintets, an enormous piano repertoire, several scores for wind ensembles, as well as many melodies and Lieder. There are also five dramatic cantatas: Aslega, Œdipe à Colone, Iphigénie en Tauride, Électre, and Polyxène; two operas: Le Cid and Mateo Falcone; as well as some large religious works, including a Requiem, a Stabat Mater, a Missa brevis, and the cantata Golgotha. A list of his works was compiled by François-Joseph Fétis and Arthur Pougin. An important portion of his compositions was not published during his lifetime. Publishing them is now the major aim of the Institut Théodore Gouvy.

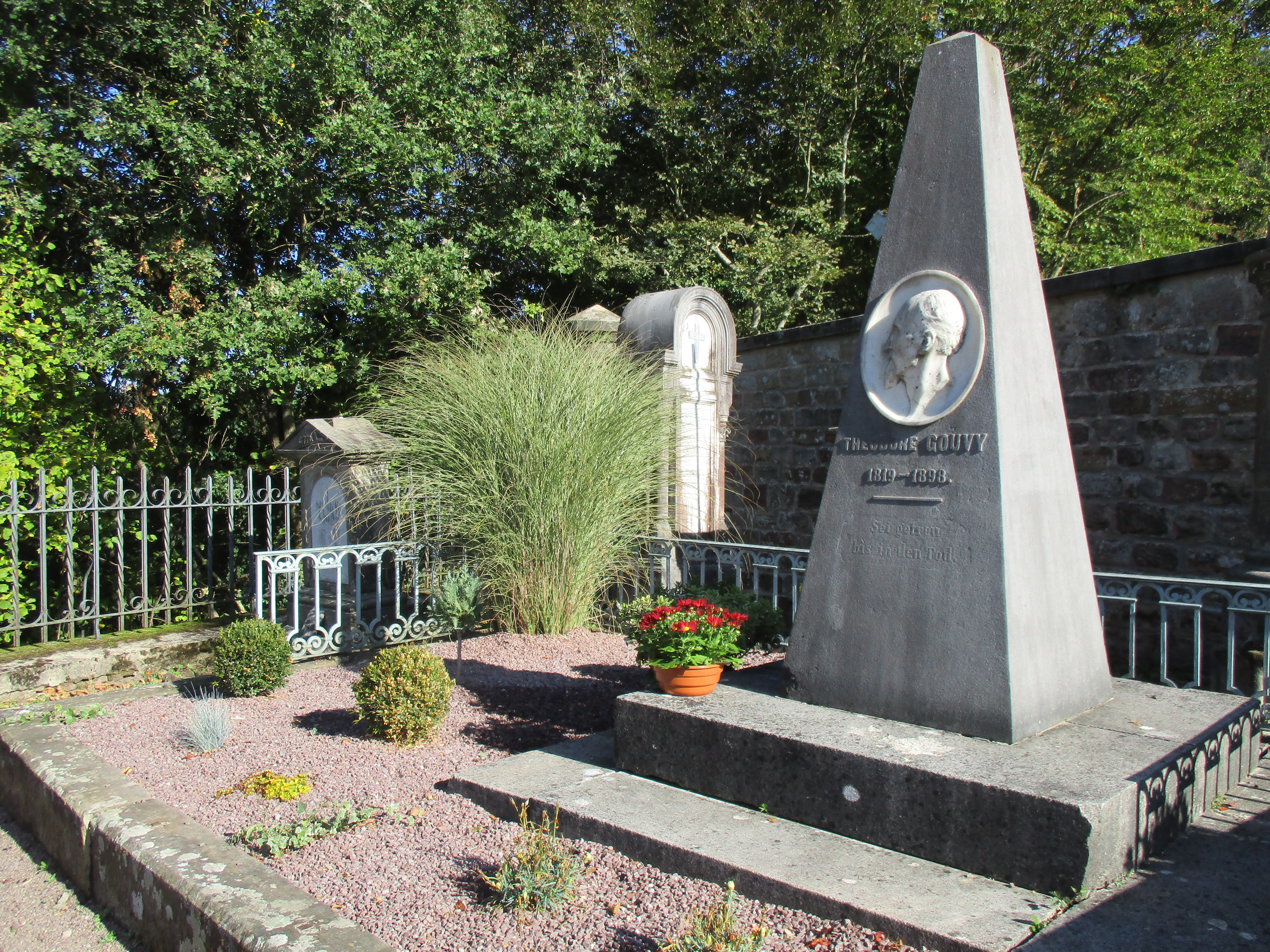
Grave of Théodore Gouvy in Hombourg-Haut, France

Gouvy was elected to the Académie des Beaux-Arts in Paris in 1894 on the death of Anton Rubinstein, and to the Prussian Academy of Sciences (König-Preussische Akademie) in Berlin in 1895. In 1896 he was named a Chevalier de la Légion d'honneur. He died in Leipzig on 21 April 1898.

== Appreciation ==
Gouvy was a man of two cultures, divided between France and Germany, from which he drew his inspiration, his characteristics and his force. While to a certain extent he was known and recognised in his lifetime, he fell into obscurity following his death.

During his lifetime, his compositions, and especially his chamber music, were held in high regard and often performed in countries like Germany, Austria, England, Scandinavia, and Russia, rather than France. Gouvy was universally acknowledged for being a master of form and for his deft sense of instrumental timbre. Mendelssohn and Schumann were his models. Virtually all of his works show that he was a gifted melodist. Musicians of the first rank such as Johannes Brahms, Carl Reinecke, and Joseph Joachim, who were familiar with Gouvy's music, held it in high regard.

Hector Berlioz wrote in the Journal des débats of 13 April 1851: "[t]hat a musician of the importance of M. Gouvy is still not very well known in Paris, and that so many gnats bother the public with their tenacious buzzing, it is enough to confuse and inflame the naive spirits that still believe in the reason and the justice of our musical manners."

But Berlioz's favourable reviews had little effect, and Gouvy's music continued to be neglected until the end of the 20th century. In 1994, his Requiem, with its vigorous Dies iræ, was revived by the Lorraine Philharmonic Orchestra under the direction of Jacques Houtmann (who recorded a CD with the work, which appeared the K617 label). Stylistically the composition owes something to Mendelssohn, to Gounod, and to Verdi, but remains quietly original despite these influences. His Symphonies along with his Sinfonietta Op. 80, were recorded by Jacques Mercier leading the Deutsche Radio Philharmonie Saarbrucken Kaiserslautern, by CPO. Although his work comprises more than two hundred compositions, including 90 opuses published in his lifetime, it largely remains ignored.

== Works ==
=== Opera ===
- Le Cid (1853) with German libretto
- Mateo Falcone

=== Orchestral works ===
- Symphony No. 1 in E♭ major, Op. 9 (1845)
- Serenade for strings, Op. 11
- Symphony No. 2 in F major, Op. 12 (1848)
- Le Giaour Overture, Op. 14
- Symphony No. 3 in C major, Op. 20 (1850) (premiered by 1854 in Leipzig)
- Symphony No. 4 in D minor, Op. 25 (1855) (premiered 1856 at Gürzenich)
- Symphony No. 5 in B♭ major, Op. 30 (pub.1868)
- Symphonie brève; variations et rondo pour orchestre in G minor, Op. 58 (1855?)
- Jeanne d'Arc (Concert Overture) (1858)
- Fantaisie symphonique in G minor, Op. 69 (1879)
- Sinfonietta in D major, Op. 80 (1885)
- Symphony No. 6 in G minor, Op. 87 (1889–1892)
- Paraphrases symphoniques, Op. 89 (1886)
- Le Festival Overture
- 4 Pieces for String Orchestra
- Swedish Dance (tirée de l'Otteto), Op. 71
- Tragic March for organ and orchestra
- Variations for Orchestra on Theme of Scandinavia
- Fantasie Pastorale for violin and orchestra
- Hymne et marche triomphale

=== Chamber music ===
- Piano Trio No．1 Op．8 (1844)
- Piano Trio No．2 Op．18 (1847)
- String Quartet in E minor (1848)
- String Quartet in D major (1848)
- String Quartet in A minor (1848)
- String Quartet in B major (1855)
- Piano Trio No．3 Op．19 (1855)
- String Quartet No．1 in B♭ major Op．16/1 (1857)
- String Quartet No．2 Op．16/2 (1857)
- Piano Trio No．4 Op．22 (1858)
- Decameron, 10 Pieces for cello and piano Op．28 (1860)
- Piano Trio No．5 Op．33 (1860)
- Piano Quintet in A major Op．24 (ca.1850)
- Serenade(Piano Quartet) Op．31 (1865)
- Duets for violin and piano Op．34
- Duets for violin and piano, Op．50
- String Quintet in E minor (1869)
- String Quintet No．1 in G major Op．55 (1870)
- String Quintet in B minor (1871)
- String Quintet in B♭ major (1872)
- String Quartet No．3 Op．56 No. 1 (1872)
- String Quartet No．4 Op．56 No. 2 (1873)
- Sonata for Violin and Piano in G minor Op．61 (1873)
- String Quintet in D minor (1873) (first version)
- 6 Duets for Cello and Piano (1872–1876)
- String Quartet No．5 Op．68 (1874)
- Sonata in G for clarinet and piano Op．67 (1875)
- Impromptu for Cello and Quartet (1878)
- String Quintet in D minor, 2nd version (1879)
- Octet No．1 Op．71 (1879)
- String Quintet in A minor (1880)
- Le Nonetto (1883)
- Octet No．2 in G minor (1884)
- Sérénade vénitienne in E minor for viola and piano (1875)
- String Quartet in G minor (1886)
- Septuor(Septet) inedit dedicated to Paul Taffanel (1887)
- String Quartet in G major (reconstruction：Pierre Thilloy) (1888)
- Petite Suite Gauloise Op．90 (1888)

=== Piano music ===
- 2 Studies for piano Op. 1 (1842)
- 20 Sérénades for piano (1855)
- Divertissement for 2 pianos
- Sonata for Piano Op. 29
- Sonata in D minor for piano 4 hands Op．36
- Sonata in C minor for piano 4 hands Op．49 (1869)
- Sonata in F major for piano 4 hands Op．51 (1869)
- Variations on a French Theme for piano 4 hands Op．57
- 6 Morceaux for piano 4 hands Op．59
- Fantaisie in G minor for piano 4 hands op. 69 (1879)
- Scherzo and Aubade for piano 4 hands Op．77
- Ghribizzi Op．83

=== Choral works ===
- 12 Choral Works for Men's voices Op．23 (1860)
- Requiem Op．70 (1874)
- Stabat Mater Op．65 (1875)
- La Religieuse (1875)
- Asléga (1876)
- Le Calvaire (1877)
- Missa Brevis Op．72 (1882)
- Spring (Frühlings Erwachen) Op．73 (1878)
- Oedipus in Colonna Op．75 (1880)
- Iphigénie en Tauride Op．76 (1883)
- Electre Op．85 (1886)
- Egille Op．86 (1886)
- Polyxéne Op．88 (1894)
- Fortunato (1896)
- Golgotha
- Le dernier Hymne d'Ossian
- Didon

=== Songs ===
- "Gondoliera" Op．2 (1842)
- 6 Songs after Moritz Hartmann Op．21 (1857)
- 20 German Poems Op．26
- 40 Poèmes de Ronsard Op．37, Op.41, Op.42, Op.44 (1876)
- Songs and Sonnets by Desportes Op．45 (1867)
- "La pléiade francaise" Op．48 (1876)
- "Que dites-vous, que faites-vous, mignonne?" (1866)
- "Regrets" (1866)

== See also ==
- Théodore Gouvy International Festival

== Bibliography ==
- Mario d'Angelo, Martin Kaltenecker, Marc Rigaudière (ed.), Théodore Gouvy, recherches récentes (Actes du colloque international de Paris, 2019). Paris: Éditions Le Manuscrit, 2023 (publication of the 2019 international symposium on Gouvy, Paris with contributions in French and German) 384 p. ISBN 978-2-304-05350-0.
- Wolfgang Birtel, "Zu Persönlichkeit und Werk des 'saarländischen' Komponisten Theodor Gouvy (1819–1898)", in: Mitteilungen der Arbeitsgemeinschaft für mittelrheinische Musikgeschichte, vol. 38 (1979), p. 463–472.
- Alexandre Dratwicki (ed.), Théodore Gouvy: Cantates, œuvres symphoniques et musique de chambre, CD booklet notes (3 CDs), Ediziones singulares/Palazetto Bru-Zane (Centre de musique romantique française), 2013.
- Otto-Adolf Klauwell, Theodor Gouvy. Sein Leben und seine Werke (Berlin: Harmonie, 1902).
- Herbert Schneider & René Auclair (ed.), Théodore Gouvy 1819–1898. Bericht über den Internationalen Kongress / Actes du Colloque international, Saarbrücken/Hombourg-Haut' (Hildesheim: Georg Olms Verlag, 2008), ISBN 978-3-487-13541-0.
