= Miriam Feuersinger =

Austrian soprano

Miriam Feuersinger (born 1978) is an Austrian soprano.

== Life ==
Feuersinger grew up in Bregenz, where she received her basic musical training at the local music school. She pursued her vocal studies at the Vorarlberger Landeskonservatorium and then with Kurt Widmer at the City of Basel Music Academy, where she graduated with distinction.

Her oeuvre encompasses in particular a spectrum encompassing church music from Baroque to late romanticism, but also the field of Lieder. One focus is the cantata and passion work of Johann Sebastian Bach.

In 2014, she initiated the series "Bach cantatas in Vorarlberg". There, under the musical direction of Thomas Platzgummer, two Bach cantatas are performed three times a year in two concerts, each with soloists. As of July 2018, these have been BWV 22, BWV 30, BWV 32, BWV 44, BWV 49, BWV 61, BWV 65, BWV 72, BWV 75, BWV 76, BWV 80, BWV 84, BWV 92, BWV 93, BWV 99, BWV 106, BWV 147, BWV 150, BWV 165, BWV 166, BWV 167, BWV 170, BWV 176, BWV 180 and BWV 194.

Feuersinger is active in the field of early music together with interpreters such as Jörg-Andreas Bötticher, Laurent Gendre, Sigiswald Kuijken, Peter Kooij, Ton Koopman, Václav Luks, Rudolf Lutz and Hans-Christoph Rademann. Baroque ensembles and orchestras playing with her include the Collegium 1704, the Netherlands Bach Society, the Freiburger Barockorchester, L'arpa festante, L’Orfeo Barockorchester, La Cetra Barockorchester Basel, Les Cornets Noirs, Capricornus Consort Basel, Il Concerto Viennese, Concerto Stella Matutina, Capriccio Basel sowie Chor und Orchester der J. S. Bach-Stiftung.

Feuersinger performed in the Berliner Philharmonie, in the Konzerthaus Freiburg, in the Liederhalle Stuttgart and in the Wiener Musikverein.

She has already sung several times in the Martinskirche (Basel), Basel Minster, St. Paul's Church, Basel, Peterskirche (Basel), Predigerkirche (Basel), Pfarrkirche Bregenz-Herz Jesu, Kreuzkirche am Ölrain (Bregenz), Feldkirch Cathedral, Propstei St. Gerold, Klosterkirche Muri, St. Johann Schaffhausen, Reformierte Kirche Trogen and St. Peter (Zürich) churches.

Her recording of solo cantatas by Christoph Graupner, co-produced by Radio SRF 2 Kultur and awarded several prizes, includes three world premieres.

== Awards ==
- 2014: ECHO Klassik, Soloistic recording of the year/vocals, for Graupner' CD: "Himmlische Stunden, selige Zeiten."
- 2014: Preis der deutschen Schallplattenkritik, for Graupner's CD: "Himmlische Stunden, selige Zeiten."

== Recordings ==
CDs

- Johann Sebastian Bach: Missae breves BWV 234 and 235. Miriam Feuersinger (soprano), Alex Potter (alto), Hans Jörg Mammel (tenor), Markus Volpert (bass); Ensemble Orlando Fribourg, La Cetra Barockorchester Basel. Claves, 2009.
- Johann Sebastian Bach: Celebration Cantatas – Entfliehet, ihr Sorgen. BWV 205a (Blast Lärmen, ihr Feinde, „Krönungskantate“; Welt-Ersteinspielung) and 249a (Entfliehet, verschwindet, entweichet, ihr Sorgen, „Schäferkantate“; Reconstruction: Alexander Grychtolik). Miriam Feuersinger (soprano), Elvira Bill (alto), Daniel Johannsen (tenor), Stephan MacLeod (bass); Deutsche Hofmusik, Alexander Grychtolik. Deutsche Harmonia Mundi, 2019.
- Dieterich Buxtehude: Opera omnia XVIII. Vokalwerke 8. Miriam Feuersinger, Bettina Pahn and Dorothee Wohlgemuth (sopranos), Maarten Engeltjes (alto), Tilman Lichdi (tenor), Klaus Mertens (bass), Amsterdam Baroque Orchestra & Choir, Ton Koopman. 2 CDs. Challenge Classics, 2013.
- Dieterich Buxtehude: Opera Omnia XIX. Vokalwerke 9. Miriam Feuersinger, Dorothee Wohlgemuth, Bettina Pahn uand Amaryllis Dieltiens (sopranos), Maarten Engeltjes (alto), Tilman Lichdi (tenor), Klaus Mertens (bass), Amsterdam Baroque Choir, Amsterdam Baroque Orchestra, Ton Koopman. Challenge Classics, 2013.
- Dieterich Buxtehude: Opera Omnia XX. Vokalwerke 10. Bettina Pahn, Dorothee Wohlgemuth, Amaryillis Dieltiens, Verena Gropper, Gerlinde Sämann and Miriam Feuersinger (soprano), Maarten Engeltjes (alto), Tilman Lichdi and Joost van der Linden (tenors), Klaus Mertens (bass), Amsterdam Baroque Orchestra & Choir, Ton Koopman (direction and organ). Challenge Classics, 2013.
- Philipp Heinrich Erlebach: Süße Freundschaft, edles Band. (Aria Meine Seufzer, for soprano, Streicher and Basso continuo; Duett Süße Freundschaft, edles Band; among others) Miriam Feuersinger (soprano), Franz Vitzthum (countertenor), Capricornus Consort Basel. Christophorus, 2012.
- Johann Melchior Gletle: Marienvesper. Regula Konrad, Miriam Feuersinger (soprano), Peter Kennel (alto), Valentin J. Gloor (tenor), Stefan Vock (bass), Bläserensemble „Il Desiderio“, Streicherensemble, Collegium Vocale Lenzburg, Thomas Baldinger (conducting). Livemitschnitt. MGB, 2005.
- Christoph Graupner: Himmlische Stunden, selige Zeiten. Solo cantata Angst und Jammer, GWV 1145/11, Furcht und Zagen, GWV 1102/11b, Ich bleibe Gott getreu, GWV 1106/19 and Ach Gott und Herr, GWV 1144/11, Tombeau aus Ouverture c-moll GWV 413. Miriam Feuersinger (soprano), Capricornus Consort Basel. Christophorus-Verlag, 2013.
- Christoph Graupner: Duo-Kantaten. Miriam Feuersinger (soprano) and Franz Vitzthum (countertenor), Capricornus Consort Basel. Christophorus, 2018.
- Niccolò Jommelli: Requiem & Miserere. Miriam Feuersinger, Gudrun Sidonie Otto (sopranos), Helen Charlston, Gaia Petrone (altos), Daniel Johannsen, Valerio Contaldo (tenors), Sebastian Myrus, Wolf Matthias Friedrich (basses), Il Gardellino (Vokalensemble u. Orchester), Peter van Heyghen (conducting). Passacaille, 2020.
- Georg Muffat: Missa in labore requies. Antonio Bertali, Johann Heinrich Schmelzer, Heinrich Ignaz Franz Biber: Kirchensonaten. Miriam Feuersinger, Stephanie Petitlaurent (sopranos), Alex Potter, William Purefoy (altos), Hans Jörg Mammel, Manuel Warwitz (tenors), Markus Flaig, Lisandro Abadie (basses), Cappella Murensis, Trompetenconsort Innsbruck, Les Cornets Noirs, Johannes Strobl (conducting). Recorded in the Klosterkirche Muri. Audite, 2016.
- Georg Philipp Telemann: Festive Cantatas. (Festliche Kantaten.) (Der Herr lebet, TvWv 1:284; Ehr und Dank sey Dir gesungen, TvWV 1:413, Der Geist gibt Zeugnis, TvWv 1:243). Miriam Feuersinger (soprano; in TvWv 1:284), Franz Vitzthum (countertenor), Klaus Mertens (bass), Collegium vocale Siegen, Hannoversche Hofkapelle, Ulrich Stötzel (conductor). Hänssler, 2014.
- Baldassare Vialardo: Missa Vestiva i colli. Mit Kompositionen über das madrigal Vestiva i colli by Adriano Banchieri, Giovanni Paolo Cima, Ignazio Donati, Michelangelo Grancini, Francesco Rognoni and Bartolomeo de Selma y Salaverde. Miriam Feuersinger (soprano), Hans Jörg Mammel (tenor), William Dongois (cornett; Improvisation), Musica Fiorita, Daniela Dolci (harpsichord, organ and conducting). Christophorus, 2015. (Missa von Vialardo as Initial recording).
- La Dresda galante. Pieces by Wilhelm Friedemann Bach, Johann Adolph Hasse (Motette Alta nubes illustrata), Johann David Heinichen, Giovanni Alberto Ristori (cantata Lavinia a Turno) and Antonio Vivaldi. Miriam Feuersinger (soprano), Renate Steinmann (Konzertmeisterin), Jermaine Sprosse (harpsichord), Zürcher Barockorchester. Klanglogo, 2013.
- Dess sich wunder alle Welt – Lieder zum Advent. Gesänge zu den vier Adventssonntagen von Eustache du Caurroy, Johann Eccard, Heinrich Finck, Christoph Graupner, Hans Leo Hassler, Heinrich Isaac, Orlando di Lasso, Hans-Jörg Kalmbach, Lucas Osiander the Elder, Jacob Praetorius, Michael Praetorius, Andreas Raselius, Balthasar Resinarius, Samuel Scheidt, Johann Stadlmayr, Franz Tunder and Melchior Vulpius. Miriam Feuersinger (soprano), Daniel Schreiber (tenor), Les Escapades (Sabine Kreutzberger, Adina Scheyhing, Franziska Finckh, Barbara Pfeifer (viola da Gamba), Evelyn Laib (organ)). Christophorus, 2015.
- Herzens-Lieder. Johann Sebastian Bach: Cantata Mein Herze schwimmt im Blut, BWV 199; Christoph Graupner: Cantata Mein Herz schwimmt in Blut, GWV 1152/12b; Johann Kuhnau: Cantata Weicht, ihr Sorgen, aus dem Hertzen; Georg Philipp Telemann: Quartet G major, TWV 43: G5. Miriam Feuersinger (soprano), Capricornus Consort Basel. Christophorus, 2015.
- Sacred Salterio. Lamentations of the Holy Week for soprano, salterio obligato & basso continuo. Werke von Anonay (18. Jh.), D. Domenico Merola (18. Jh.) and Gennaro Manna (1715–1779). Miriam Feuersinger (soprano), Il Dolce Conforto, Jonathan Pesek (violoncello), Deniel Perer (organ), Franziska Fleischanderl (Salterio und Leitung). Christophorus, 2017.
- Johann Rosenmüller: Habe deine Lust an dem Herren. Dazu: ders: Wie der Hirsch schreiet nach frischem Wasser. Ist Gott für uns. Johann Balthasar Erben: Ich freue mich im Herrn. Georg Christoph Strattner: Herr, wie lange willst du mein so gar vergessen. Augustin Pfleger: O barmherziger Vater. Christian Flor: Es ist gnug. Nicolaus Adam Strungk: Sonata a 6 Viol. Antonio Bertali: Sonata à 6. Giovanni Legrenzi: Sonata quinta [...] Miriam Feuersinger, "Les Escapades" (Cosimo Stawiarski, Christoph Riedo (violin), Sabine Kreutzberger, Franziska Finckh, Adina Scheyhing, Barbara Pfeifer (Viola da Gamba), Simon Linné (theorbo), Evelyn Laib (organ)). Christophoruns, 2018.
- Marco Giuseppe Peranda: Sacred Music from Dresden. (Missa in a, Repleti sunt omnes, Accurite gentes, Timor et tremor, Factum est proelium; Vincenzo Albrici: Sinfonia à 2; David Pohle: Sonata à 6.) Miriam Feuersinger, Maria Cristina Kiehr (sopranos), Alex Potter (alto), Raphael Höhn, Jakob Pilgram (tenor), Markus Flaig (bass), Abendmusiken Basel, Jörg-Andreas Bötticher (organ and conducting). Coviello Classics, 2018.

DVDs

- Johann Sebastian Bach: Du wahrer Gott und Davids Sohn, BWV 23. Miriam Feuersinger (soprano), Markus Forster (alto), Jens Weber (tenor), Fabrice Hayoz (bass); Chor und Orchester der J. S. Bach-Stiftung, Norbert Zeilberger (organ), Rudolf Lutz (Leitung). Samt Einführungsworkshop sowie Reflexion von Konrad Hummler. Gallus-Media, 2010.
- Johann Sebastian Bach: Falsche Welt, dir trau ich nicht, BWV 52. Miriam Feuersinger (soprano), Chor und Orchester der J. S. Bach-Stiftung, Rudolf Lutz (Leitung). Samt Einführungsworkshop sowie Reflexion von Michael Guggenheimer. Gallus Media, 2015.
- Johann Sebastian Bach: O Ewigkeit, du Donnerwort, BWV 60. Miriam Feuersinger (soprano), Claude Eichenberger (alto), Bernhard Berchtold (tenor), Markus Volpert (bass); Schola Seconda Pratica, Rudolf Lutz (Leitung). DVD. Gallus-Media, 2008. (Auch als CD: Bach-Kantaten N° 2 (with BVW 22 and 34).)
- Johann Sebastian Bach: Siehe, ich will viel Fischer aussenden, BWV 88. Miriam Feuersinger (soprano), Ruth Sandhoff (alto), Andreas Weller (tenor), Markus Volpert (bass); Orchestra of the J. S. Bach-Stiftung, Rudolf Lutz (conducting and harpsichord). Including introductory workshop and reflexion by Isabelle Graesslé. Gallus-Media, 2009.
- Johann Sebastian Bach: Wer nur den lieben Gott läßt walten, BWV 93. Miriam Feuersinger (soprano), Jan Börner (alto), Julius Pfeifer (tenor), Markus Volpert (bass); Choir and orchestra of the J. S. Bach-Stiftung (with Norbert Zeilberger (organ)), Rudolf Lutz (conducting and harpsichord). Including introductory workshop and reflexion by Michael von Brück. Gallus-Media, 2011. (Auch als CD: Bach-Kantaten N°. 14. (with BWV 119 and 163).)
- Johann Sebastian Bach: Lobe den Herren, den mächtigen König der Ehren, BWV 137. Miriam Feuersinger (soprano), Claude Eichenberger (alto), Johannes Kaleschke (tenor), Markus Volpert (bass); Chor und Orchester der J. S. Bach-Stiftung, Rudolf Lutz (conducting and organ). Including introductory workshop and reflexion by Martin Johann Stähli. Gallus-Media, 2011.
- Johann Sebastian Bach: Nur jedem das Seine, BWV 163. Miriam Feuersinger (soprano), Markus Forster (Altus), Johannes Kaleschke (tenor), Markus Volpert (bass); Orchester der J. S. Bach-Stiftung, Rudolf Lutz (Leitung). Including workshop for work introduction and musical reflection by Roland Moser (Ach! aber ach! Nach-Denken über die Kantate "Nur jedem das Seine" von J. S. Bach und S. Franck in Form eines instrumental-vokalen Rezitativs mit Choral für vier Solo-Stimmen, sechs Streichinstrumente und Orgel.) Gallus-Media, 2013. (also as CD: Bach-Kantaten N°. 14. (with BWV 93 and 119)).
- Johann Sebastian Bach: Leichtgesinnte Flattergeister. Miriam Feuersinger (soprano), Alex Potter (alto), Julius Pfeiffer (tenor), Klaus Mertens (bass); Orchester der J. S. Bach-Stiftung, Rudolf Lutz (conducting and harpsichord). Including workshop for work introduction and musical reflection by Hildegard Elisabeth Keller. Gallus Media, 2015.
- Johann Sebastian Bach: Du Friedefürst, Herr Jesu Christ. Miriam Feuersinger (soprano), Elvira Bill (alto), Julius Pfeiffer (tenor), Stephan MacLeod (bass), Chor und Orchester der J. S. Bach-Stiftung, Rudolf Lutz (conductor). Including workshop for work introduction and musical reflection by Heidi Tagliavini. Gallus Media, 2016.
