= Gott der Herr ist Sonn und Schild, BWV 79 =

1725 church cantata by Johann Sebastian Bach

Gott der Herr ist Sonn und Schild
- BWV 79
- Church cantata by J. S. Bach
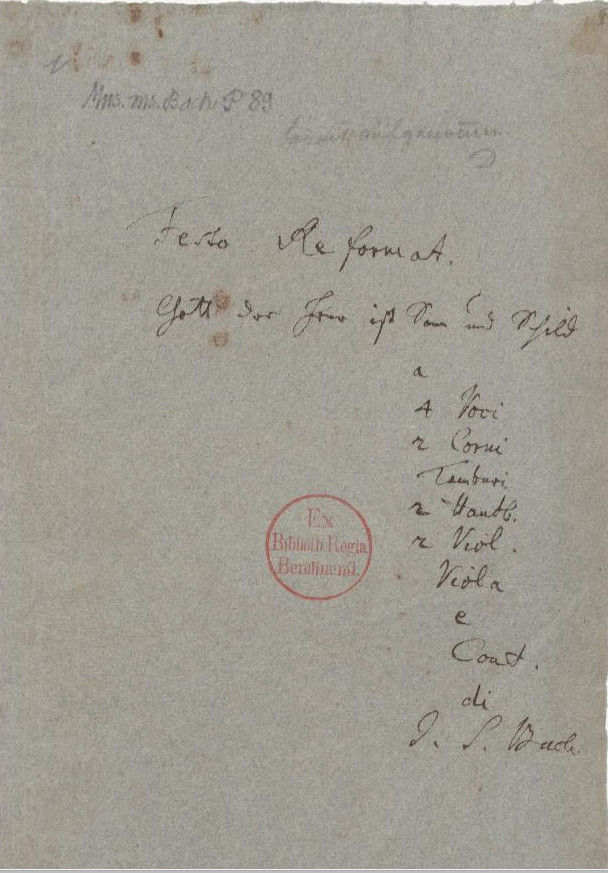
- Title page of the autograph score
- Occasion: Reformation Day
- Bible text: Psalms 84:11
- Chorale: "Nun danket alle Gott" by Martin Rinckart; "Nun laßt uns Gott dem Herren" by Ludwig Helmbold
- Performed: 31 October 1725: Leipzig
- Movements: 6
- Vocal: SATB choir and soloists
- Instrumental: 2 horns; timpani; 2 oboes; 2 violins; viola; continuo

Gott der Herr ist Sonn und Schild, (Note: German pronunciation: [ˈgɔt dɛɐ̯ ˈhɛɐ̯ ɪst ˈsɔn ʊnt ˈʃilt], meaning 'God the Lord is Sun and Shield'.) BWV 79, is a church cantata for Reformation Day by Johann Sebastian Bach. He composed it in 1725, his third year in the position of Thomaskantor in Leipzig, and led the first performance on 31 October that year. It is possibly his first cantata for the occasion.

The text was written by an unknown poet, who did not refer to the prescribed readings for the day. He began the libretto for the feast with a quotation from Psalm 84 and included two hymn stanzas, the first from Martin Rinckart's "Nun danket alle Gott", associated with Reformation Day in Leipzig, as the third movement, and as the last movement the final stanza of Ludwig Helmbold's "Nun laßt uns Gott dem Herren". Bach composed a work of "festive magnificence", structured in six movements, with an aria following the opening chorus, and a recitative and duet following the first chorale. He scored the work for three vocal soloists, a four-part choir, and a Baroque instrumental ensemble of two horns, timpani, two transverse flutes (added for a later performance), two oboes, strings and continuo. He achieved a unity within the structure by using the horns not only in the opening but also as obbligato instruments in the two chorales, the first time even playing the same motifs.

Bach performed the cantata again, probably in 1730. He later reworked the music of the opening chorus and a duet for his Missa in G major, BWV 236, and the music of an alto aria for his Missa in A major, BWV 234.

== History ==
=== Background ===
In 1723, Bach was appointed Thomaskantor (director of church music) in Leipzig, where he was responsible for the music at four churches and the training and education of boys singing in the Thomanerchor. He took office in the middle of the liturgical year, on the first Sunday after Trinity, 30 May 1723. In the new position, Bach decided to compose church cantatas for almost all liturgical events for the first twelve months; they became his first cantata cycle. The occasions were Sundays, except for the silent times of Advent (before Christmas) and Lent (before Easter), and additional feast days; several feasts of saints were observed in Leipzig, and each of the high holidays (Christmas, Easter and Pentecost), was celebrated three days in a row. The following year, Bach went on to write a second cantata cycle, now basing each on a Lutheran hymn. Christoph Wolff described the endeavour, in his book Johann Sebastian Bach: The Learned Musician, as "a most promising project of great homogeneity, whose scope he was able to define himself".

Bach slowed down in his third year on the post, beginning to perform cantatas also by other composers. During this year, he composed Gott der Herr ist Sonn und Schild for Reformation Day.

==== Reformation Day ====
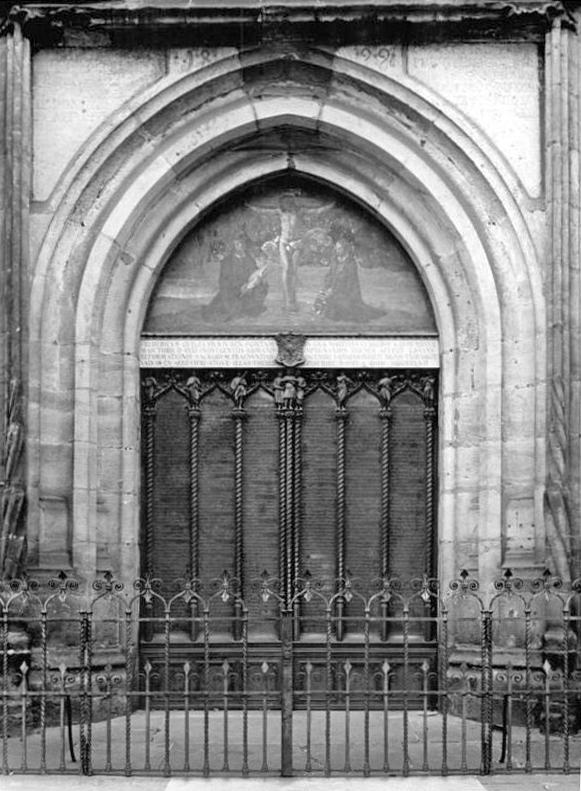
Main door of the Schlosskirche, Wittenberg, where the Reformation is supposed to have begun

Reformation Day is a feast in memory of the beginning of the Reformation on 31 October 1517. The bicentenary of the event occurred while Bach was court composer in Weimar, but he composed no music for the occasion. He used Martin Luther's hymn "Ein feste Burg ist unser Gott" ('A Mighty Fortress is our God'), which became associated with the Reformation, in Weimar for a Lenten cantata, Alles, was von Gott geboren, BWV 80a, in 1715.

There is no evidence of a cantata performance for the occasion in 1723, and it is doubtful whether Bach performed an early version of Ein feste Burg ist unser Gott, BWV 80, derived from the Lenten cantata, in 1724; thus Gott der Herr ist Sonn und Schild may have been his first work for the occasion.

When John Eliot Gardiner conducted the Bach Cantata Pilgrimage in 2000, he chose to perform the cantatas for Reformation Day at the Schlosskirche in Wittenberg, a symbol of the beginning of the Reformation with the Ninety-five Theses widely believed to have been posted on its door.

==== Readings and text ====
The prescribed readings for the feast day were from the Second Epistle to the Thessalonians, "be steadfast against adversaries" (2 Thessalonians 2:3–8), and from the Book of Revelation, "fear God and honour him" (Revelation 14:6–8). These recommended readings were not used by the librettist, whose identity is unknown. Rather, the poet began the text with a quotation from Psalm 84 (Psalms 84:11). He included the first stanza from Martin Rinckart's hymn "Nun danket alle Gott" and as the closing chorale the final stanza of Ludwig Helmbold's hymn "Nun laßt uns Gott dem Herren". According to the Bach scholar Klaus Hofmann, the first of these hymns was sung regularly after the sermon on Reformation Day in Leipzig. The text is at times related to the "bellicose" language of the Reformation."

==== Performances ====
Bach led the Thomanerchor in the first performances of the cantata on 31 October 1725, at the Thomaskirche in the morning service, with a sermon by Christian Weise, and in a vespers service at the Nikolaikirche, with a sermon by Salomon Deyling. Bach performed the cantata again in 1730, with minor changes in the scoring, doubling the oboes by flutes and assigning a flute as the obbligato instrument in the alto aria. Both versions are equally authentic.

Bach used the music of the opening chorus and the duet again in his Missa in G major, BWV 236, and the music of the alto aria in his Missa in A major, BWV 234. The chorale movement "Nun danket alle Gott" has been performed as an individual piece.

== Music ==
=== Structure and scoring ===
Bach structured the cantata into six movements. A choral movement is followed by an aria, a chorale, a recitative and a duet, then the cantata is closed by another chorale. He scored the work for three vocal soloists (soprano, alto, and bass), a four-part choir and a Baroque instrumental ensemble of two horns (Co), timpani (Ti), two flauto traverso (Ft), two oboes (Ob), two violins (Vl), viola (Va), and basso continuo. The title page of the autograph score reads: "Festo Reformat. / Gott der Herr ist Sonn und Schild / a / 4 Voci / 2 Corni / Tamburi / 2 Hautb. / 2 Viol. / Viola / e / Cont. / di / J.S.Bach".

In the following table of the movements, the scoring follows the Neue Bach-Ausgabe. The keys and time signatures are taken from Alfred Dürr, using the symbol for common time (4/4 =) and cut time (2/2 =). The continuo, playing throughout, is not shown.

Movements of Gott, der Herr, ist Sonn und Schild, BWV 79
No.	Title	Text	Type	Vocal	Winds	Strings	Key	Time
1	Gott, der Herr, ist Sonn und Schild	anon.	Chorus	SATB	2Co Ti 2Ft 2Ob	2Vl Va	G major	cut time
2	Gott ist unser Sonn und Schild	anon.	Aria	A	Ob		D major	6/8
3	Nun danket alle Gott	Rinckart	Chorale	SATB	2Co Ti 2Ft 2Ob	2Vl Va	G major	cut time
4	Gottlob! Wir wissen den rechten Weg zur Seligkeit	anon.	Recitative	B				common time
5	Gott, ach Gott, verlaß die Deinen nimmermehr	anon.	Aria	S B		2Vl	B minor	cut time
6	Erhalt uns in der Wahrheit	Helmbold	Chorale	SATB	2Co Ti 2Ft 2Ob	2Vl Va	G major	3/4

=== Movements ===
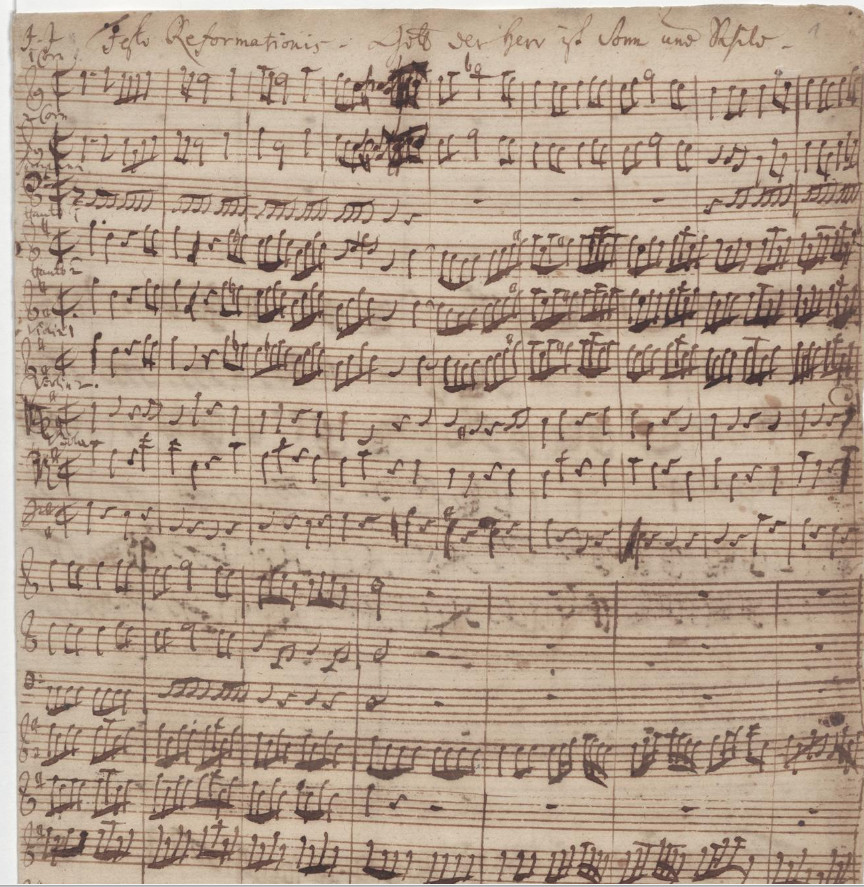
First page of the autograph score

Hofmann notes that Bach achieved "festive magnificence" by using two horns and timpani not only in the opening chorus but also as obbligato instruments in the two chorales. Bach established unity of form by using a horn motif from the first movement again in the first chorale, juxtaposed to the hymn tune.

==== 1 ====
The cantata opens with a choral movement, "Gott der Herr ist Sonn und Schild" (God the Lord is sun and shield). The instrumental ritornello introduces two themes: "a festive, march-like theme for the horns and timpani, and a more lively counter-theme that develops from a note that is repeated seven times." The ritornello, structured in three parts, is among the longest in Bach's opening choruses. Gardiner describes the opening chorus as a ceremonial procession, and hears the "insistent drum beat" going along with the "fanfares of the high horns" as "the hammering of Luther's theses to the oak door at the back of the church".

==== 2 ====
The aria for alto and an obbligato oboe, "Gott ist unsre Sonn und Schild!" (God is our sun and shield!), expresses similar ideas to the first movement in a personal way. In a later version, the oboe is replaced by a transverse flute.

==== 3 ====
In the first chorale, "Nun danket alle Gott" (Now let everyone thank God), Bach uses the first theme of the opening again, simultaneously with the chorale tune. The conductor Helmuth Rilling, who recorded all Bach cantatas, notes the unity of topic, praise and thanks to God, for the first three movements. The praise, individual in the preceding aria, is now communal again. Gardiner assumes that the sermon may have followed the chorale.

==== 4 ====
The only recitative, sung by the bass, "Gottlob, wir wissen den rechten Weg zur Seligkeit" (Praise God, we know the right way to blessedness), mentions the reason for thanks on this occasion. The phrase "Du hast uns durch dein Wort gewiesen" (You have instructed us through Your word) addresses "the basic issues of the Reformation", as Rilling points out.

==== 5 ====
A duet for bass and soprano, "Gott, ach Gott, verlaß die Deinen nimmermehr!" (God, ah God, abandon Your own ones never again!) expresses a prayer for protection. The voices are in homophony, beginning without the instruments, while a "sharply contoured violin theme" appears first alone, then together with the voices. All violins play it in unison. The motif was attributed by the Bach scholar Albert Schweitzer to tumult, representing the "raging of enemies" mentioned in the text. Gardiner hears in the "innocent" setting of the voices "a pre-echo ... of Papageno and Papagena, a Mozartian impression, reinforced by the hint of Eine kleine Nachtmusik in the violin ritornelli".

==== 6 ====
The cantata ends with a four-part setting, augmented by two horns and timpani, of the eighth stanza of the chorale "Nun laßt uns Gott dem Herren", "Erhalt uns in der Wahrheit" (Uphold us in the truth), asking for the gifts of truth and eternal freedom. The horns play again independently.

Erhalt uns in der Wahrheit,
gib ewigliche Freiheit,
zu preisen deinen Namen
durch Jesum Christum. Amen.

Translation:

Uphold us in the truth,
give eternal freedom,
to praise your name
in Jesus Christ. Amen.

== Manuscripts and publication ==
The manuscripts of both the score and the parts of Gott der Herr ist Sonn und Schild are extant. Compared to other cantatas, the parts show little revision by Bach, in the form of slurs, dynamics and ornaments. The score was written on paper not found in other extant scores, and it also contains sketches for two other compositions, which could indicate a composition in stages or a shortage of paper.

The first critical edition of the cantata, edited by Wilhelm Rust, was published by the Bach Gesellschaft in 1870 as part of its complete edition of Bach's works. In the Neue Bach-Ausgabe, the second edition of Bach's works, the cantata was published in 1987, edited by Frieder Rempp.

== Recordings ==
The entries are taken from the listing on the Bach Cantatas Website. Ensembles playing period instruments in historically informed performances are marked green under the header Instr..

Recordings of Gott der Herr ist Sonn und Schild
Title	Conductor / Choir / Orchestra	Soloists	Label	Year	Instr.
The RIAS Bach Cantatas Project (1949–1952)	Karl Ristenpart RIAS Kammerchor RIAS-Kammerorchester	Agnes Giebel; Lorri Lail; Dietrich Fischer-Dieskau	Audite	1950	
J. S. Bach: Cantata BWV 39 & BWV 79	Fritz Lehmann Berliner Motettenchor Berliner Philharmoniker	Gunthild Weber; Lore Fischer; Hermann Schey	Archiv Produktion	1952	
J. S. Bach: Kantate 'Gott, der Herr, ist Sonn' und Schild'	Karl Richter Münchener Bach-Chor Members of the Bavarian State Opera Munich	Antonia Fahberg; Beatrice Krebs; Kieth Engen	Decca	1955	
J. S. Bach: Cantata No. 32, 79	Karl Ristenpart Laubach Choir Chamber Orchestra of the Saar	Ingeborg Reichelt; Annelotte Sieber-Ludwig; Jakob Stämpfli	Music Guild	1956	
Les Grandes Cantates de J.S. Bach Vol. 19	Fritz Werner Heinrich-Schütz-Chor Heilbronn Pforzheim Chamber Orchestra	Edith Selig; Claudia Hellmann; Jakob Stämpfli	Erato	1964	
J. S. Bach: Cantatas BWV 80 & BWV 79	Wolfgang Gönnenwein Süddeutscher Madrigalchor Consortium Musicum	Elly Ameling; Janet Baker; Hans Sotin	EMI	1967	
J. S. Bach: Das Kantatenwerk • Complete Cantatas • Les Cantates, Fol / Vol. 20 – BWV 76-79	Gustav Leonhardt: Knabenchor Hannover; Collegium Vocale Gent; Leonhardt-Consort	Soloist of the Knabenchor Hannover; Paul Esswood; Max van Egmond	Teldec	1980	Period
Bach Made in Germany Vol. 4 – Cantatas X	Hans-Joachim Rotzsch Thomanerchor Gewandhausorchester	Arleen Auger; Ortrun Wenkel; Theo Adam	Eterna	1982	
Lecture Concerts – New Recordings Cantatas	Helmuth Rilling: Frankfurter Kantorei; Gächinger Kantorei; Bach-Collegium Stuttgart	Sibylla Rubens; Ingeborg Danz; Markus Marquardt	Hänssler	1997	
Bach Edition Vol. 15 – Cantatas Vol. 8	Pieter Jan Leusink Holland Boys Choir Netherlands Bach Collegium	Ruth Holton; Sytse Buwalda; Bas Ramselaar	Brilliant Classics	2000	Period
For the 19th Sunday after Trinity; For the Feast of Reformation	John Eliot Gardiner Monteverdi Choir English Baroque Soloists	Joanne Lunn; William Towers; Peter Harvey	Soli Deo Gloria	2000	Period
J. S. Bach: Complete Cantatas Vol. 16	Ton Koopman Amsterdam Baroque Orchestra & Choir	Sandrine Piau; Bogna Bartosz; Klaus Mertens	Antoine Marchand	2001	Period
J. S. Bach: Cantatas Vol. 40 – BWV 79, 137, 164, 168	Masaaki Suzuki Bach Collegium Japan	Yukari Nonoshita; Robin Blaze; Peter Kooy	BIS	2007	Period
J. S. Bach: Wo Gott der Herr nicht bei uns hält	Georg Christoph Biller Thomanerchor Gewandhausorchester	soloists of the Thomanerchor; Gotthold Schwarz	Rondeau Production	2008	
J. S. Bach Lutheran Masses, Vol. II	Harry Christophers The Sixteen Orchestra of The Sixteen	soloists of The Sixteen	Coro	2014	Period
J. S. Bach: Kantate 79 "Gott der Herr ist Sonn und Schild"	Rudolf Lutz Choir & orchestra of the J. S. Bach-Stiftung	Miriam Feuersinger; Markus Forster; Daniel Johannsen; Matthias Helm	J. S. Bach-Stiftung	2017	Period
Bach Cantates BWV 76, 79, 80 "Pour Luther"	Eric Milnes None (OVPP) Montréal Baroque	Hélène Brunet; Michael Taylor; Philippe Gagné; Jesse Blumberg	ATMA Classique	2018	Period
