= Daniel Johannsen =

Austrian tenor

Daniel Johannsen (born 22 July 1978) is an Austrian operatic tenor.

== Life ==
Born in Vienna, Johannsen is the son of the protestant pastor Wolfgang and the professor of religion Ilse Johannsen. He grew up in Markt Allhau in Burgenland. At the age of seven, he became a piano student at the Oberwart music school, then he changed to Martin Hopfmüller (full professor for Protestant Church Music at the University of Music and Performing Arts Graz).

Johannsen spent his upper school years at the Protestant Music High School. He began studying church music in Oberschützen, which he continued at the University of Music and Performing Arts Vienna (organ with Alfred Mitterhofer, choir and ensemble conducting with Johannes Prinz and Johannes Hiemetsberger, composition with Wolfgang Sauseng) and passed the 1st diploma examination in 1999. Since 1998, he has been a member and soloist of the Arnold Schoenberg Choir and Concentus Vocalis Wien. His voice teacher was Margit Fleischmann Klaushofer. In 2005, he completed his studies - Lied and oratorio with Robert Holl, opera school with Ivan Parik and Reto Nickler. He attended masterclasses with Dietrich Fischer-Dieskau, Christa Ludwig and Roger Vignoles.

=== Concerts ===
Johannsen's Evangelist début with Bach's Christmas Oratorio was in December 1998 and his first recital was Schubert's Die schöne Müllerin. Johannsen has worked with conductors such as Nikolaus Harnoncourt, René Clemencic, Georges Prêtre, Sir Neville Marriner, Peter Schreier, Dennis Russell Davies, Thomas Hengelbrock, Jordi Savall, Roy Goodman, Enoch zu Guttenberg, Jos van Veldhoven and Rudolf Lutz.

=== Music theatre ===
Johannsen made his debut as "Die Allegorie der Bewegungen" in Wolfgang Sauseng's church opera Das Staunen des Ezechiel (Vienna 2002). Afterwards he was at the Lehár Festival Bad Ischl in 2003. In 2004, there were productions at the Wiener Kammeroper (a Monteverdi project with Lorenz Duftschmid and Philipp Harnoncourt) as well as at the Schlosstheater Schönbrunn (Janáček's The Cunning Little Vixen as a project of the opera class Parik/Nickler). On a tour of Japan in 2004, he appeared in Così fan tutte.

In the 2005/2006 season, Johannsen was a member of the ensemble of the Luzerner Theater's (Il barbiere di Siviglia, A Night in Venice). Here he worked with the directors Tatjana Gürbaca (Zaide) and David Hermann (Jewgenij Onjegin).

In the 2008/2009 season, he debuted at the Volksoper Wien in Eduard Künneke's operetta Der Vetter aus Dingsda and at the Ludwigsburger Schlossfestspiele in Mozart's Die Entführung aus dem Serail (Pedrillo, later also Belmonte).

In 2010, Johannsen was engaged as Tamino in Mozart's the Magic Flute at the Staatstheater am Gärtnerplatz in Munich. During the 2010 Carinthian Summer, Johannsen was cast for the world premiere of Die Geburt des Täufers by Jyrki Linjama.

== Awards ==
- 2002: XIII. International Johann Sebastian Bach Competition (Leipzig)
- 2003: 3rd Internationaler Hilde-Zadek-Gesangswettbewerb (Vienna)
- 2004: XIV. Robert Schumann International Competition for Pianists and Singers (Zwickau)
- 2004: Münchner Konzertgesellschaft, 17. Großer Förderpreiswettbewerb – August Everding Prize
- 2004: Wettbewerb der Kammeroper Schloss Rheinsberg
- 2005: Finalist des Richard Tauber Prize for Singers, in der Londoner Wigmore Hall
- 2006: 9th Internationaler Mozartwettbewerb Salzburg: Sonderpreis für die beste Liedinterpretation.

== Recordings ==
DVD

- Johann Sebastian Bach: Was Gott tut, das ist wohlgetan. Kantate BWV 98. Rudolf Lutz, Chor und Orchester der J. S. Bach-Stiftung, Sibylla Rubens (soprano), Jan Börner (alto), Daniel Johannsen (tenor), Markus Volpert (bass). Samt Einführungsworkshop sowie Reflexion von Tilmann Moser.
- Johann Sebastian Bach: Was frag ich nach der Welt. Cantata BWV 94. Rudolf Lutz, Choir and Orchestra of the J. S. Bach-Stiftung, Nuria Rial, Margot Oitzinger, Daniel Johannsen, Dominik Wörner. Samt Einführungsworkshop sowie Reflexion von Manfred Papst. Gallus Media, 2015.
- Johann Sebastian Bach: O Ewigkeit, du Donnerwort, BWV 20. Kantate BWV 20. Rudolf Lutz, Chor und Orchester der J. S. Bach-Stiftung, Markus Forster, Daniel Johannsen, Wolf Matthias Friedrich. Samt Einführungsworkshop sowie Reflexion von Sibylle Lewitscharoff. Gallus Media, 2015.
- Johann Sebastian Bach: Wachet! betet! betet! wachet!. Kantate BWV 70. Rudolf Lutz, Chor und Orchester der J. S. Bach-Stiftung, Gudrun Sidonie Otto (soprano), Margot Oitzinger (alto), Daniel Johannsen (tenor), Wolf Matthias Friedrich (bass). Samt Einführungsworkshop sowie Reflexion von Jan Assmann. Gallus Media, 2014.
- Johann Sebastian Bach: Ein ungefärbt Gemüte. Cantata BWV 24. Rudolf Lutz, Choir and Orchestra of the J. S. Bach-Stiftung, Marianne Beate Kielland (soprano), Daniel Johannsen (tenor), Dominik Wörner (bass). Samt Einführungsworkshop sowie Reflexion von Aleida Assmann. Gallus Media, 2017.

Online

- Johann Sebastian Bach: Jesus schläft, was soll ich hoffen. Kantate BWV 84. Marjon Strijk (soprano), Robin Blaze (alto), Daniel Johannsen (tenor), Stephan MacLeod (bass), Nederlandse Bachvereniging, Shunske Sato (violin and direction). 2017. online
- Johann Sebastian Bach: Sie werden aus Saba alle kommen, BWV 65. Daniel Johannsen (tenor), Matthew Brook (bass), Nederlandse Bachvereniging, Hans-Christoph Rademann (direction). 2017. online
- Johann Sebastian Bach: Darzu ist erschienen der Sohn Gottes, BWV 40. Barnabás Hegyi (alto), Daniel Johannsen (tenor), Matthew Brook (bass), Nederlandse Bachvereniging, Hans-Christoph Rademann (direction). 2018. online
- Johann Sebastian Bach: Bleib bei uns, denn es will Abend werden, BWV 6. Maria Keohane (soprano), Tim Mead (alto), Daniel Johannsen (tenor), Matthew Brook (bass), Nederlandse Bachvereniging, Jos van Veldhoven (direction). 2018. online

CD

- Johann Sebastian Bach: Celebration Cantatas – Entfliehet, ihr Sorgen. BWV 205a (Blast Lärmen, ihr Feinde, "Krönungskantate"; Welt-Ersteinspielung) and 249a (Entfliehet, verschwindet, entweichet, ihr Sorgen, BWV 249a, "Schäferkantate"; Rekonstruktion: Alexander Grychtolik). Miriam Feuersinger (soprano), Elvira Bill (alto), Daniel Johannsen (tenor), Stephan MacLeod (Bass); Deutsche Hofmusik, Alexander Grychtolik. Deutsche Harmonia Mundi, 2019.
- Niccolò Jommelli: Requiem & Miserere. Miriam Feuersinger, Gudrun Sidonie Otto (soprano), Helen Charlston, Gaia Petrone (alto), Daniel Johannsen, Valerio Contaldo (tenor), Sebastian Myrus, Wolf Matthias Friedrich (bass), Il Gardellino (Vokalensemble u. Orchester), Peter van Heyghen (direction). Passacaille, 2020.
