= William Dongois =

French cornett player

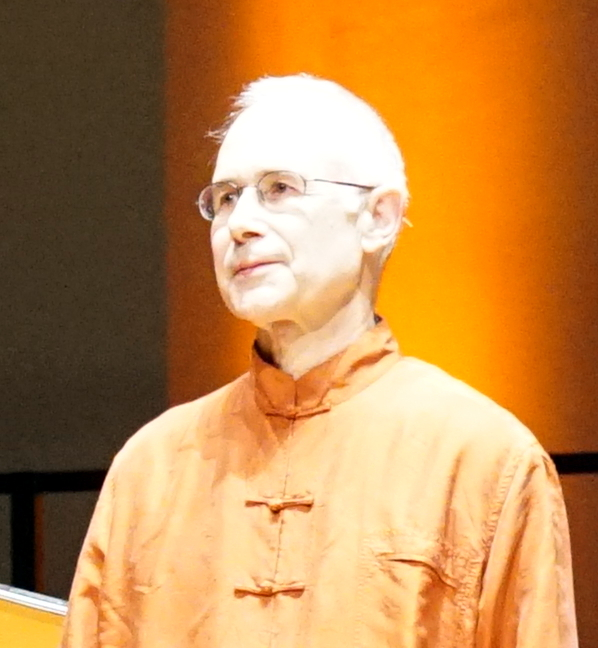
Dongois in 2018

William Dongois is a French brass player with a focus on the cornett.

== Life and career ==
Dongois was born in Langres (Champagne-Ardenne). After studying the trumpet at the conservatory in Reims and the Conservatoire de Paris, he worked as a teacher for this instrument. He also played in the orchestra of the conservatory and is a member of the orchestra of the Grand Théâtre of Reims.

Through his practice as a brass player, he discovered the music of the 16th and 17th centuries. He deepened his knowledge of music history in the composition class. The combination of his experience in trumpet playing and his fondness for the repertoire of early music then led him to his interest in the cornett. To learn the instrument he took courses with Jean-Pierre Canihac and Bruce Dickey at the Schola Cantorum Basiliensis. Under the direction of Jordi Savall, he extended his knowledge in ensemble conducting.

Dongois played for recordings with orchestras such as Hespèrion XXI and Concerto Palatino and with conductors such as Ton Koopman, Andrew Parrott, Joshua Rifkin, René Jacobs and others. Until 1993, he was a member of the ensemble La Fenice, with which he won first prizes at the music competitions for orchestras in Bruges (1990) and Malmö (1992). He is a guest performer with numerous orchestras and directs "Le Concert Brisé", the ensemble he founded in early 1992, with which he has recorded several CDs, including for the Carpe Diem Records label.

Since 2002, he has been leading the cornett class of the "Centre de Musique Ancienne" at the Geneva University of Music, and he also gives masterclasses at several European music academies.

== Recordings ==
- Dulcis Memoria, 1995.
- Symphoniae sacrae II, 1997.
- Vesper for St. Michael's Day, 1998.
- Musique Transalpine, 2002.
- L'Àge D'or du Cornet À Bouquin, 2007.
- Stadtpfeifer · Waits · Ministriles · Piffari, with Capella de la Torre, Coviello 2007.
- Baldassare Vialardo: Missa Vestiva i colli. With compositions around the madrigal Vestiva i colli by Adriano Banchieri, Giovanni Paolo Cima, Ignazio Donati, Michelangelo Grancini, Francesco Rognoni and Bartolomeo de Selma y Salaverde. Interpreten: Miriam Feuersinger (soprano), Hans Jörg Mammel (tenor), William Dongois (cornett; improvisation), Musica Fiorita, Daniela Dolci (harpsichord, organ and direction). Christophorus, 2015. (Missa von Vialardo als Ersteinspielung).
