= Michael Guggenheimer =

Swiss journalist

Michael Guggenheimer (Hebrew: מייקל גוגנהיימר; born 8 October 1946) is a Swiss journalist, writer and photographer.

== Life ==
Guggenheimer grew up in Tel Aviv (where he was born) and Amsterdam, studied contemporary history and social psychology in Zurich and was head of the communications department of the Swiss Arts Council Pro Helvetia from 1989 to 2003.

From 2007 to 2010, together with Katarina Holländer, he was curator of the exhibition Ein gewisses jüdisches Etwas in Zurich, Munich, Augsburg and Frankfurt. In 2007, Guggenheimer received the "Europe medal of the European City Görlitz" for his cultural commitment in the German-Polish twin city.

He was President of the Swiss-German PEN Centre (DSPZ) from 2013 to 2018. Together with Heinz Egger, he writes on buchort.ch about bookshops, libraries, antiquarian bookshops and other places where books are the focus of attention. Since spring 2020, he has been running the blog Filmeinwurf.ch, where he writes articles on topics related to photography. Guggenheimer has been involved with photography and cameras since his childhood.

== Work ==
- Görlitz. Schicht um Schicht. Spuren einer Zukunft. Lusatia Verlag, Bautzen/Dresden 2004.
- Tel Aviv – Hafuch Gadol und Warten im Mersand. Edition Clandestin, Biel 2013, ISBN 978-3-905297-42-3.
- Anderen beistehen. Die Freiheit des Wortes verteidigen. Reflexion about the tet of the Johann Sebastian Bach: Falsche Welt, dir trau ich nicht, BWV 52. On the occasion of a performance in the Reformierte Kirche Trogen cantata on 21 November 2014.
- on DVD: Miriam Feuersinger (soprano), choir and Orchestra of the J. S. Bach-Stiftung, Rudolf Lutz (conductor). Including introductory workshop with Karl Graf and Rudolf Lutz and reflection by Michael Guggenheimer. Gallus Media, 2015.
