= Norbert Zeilberger =

Austrian organist, harpsichordist and pianist (1 August 1969 – 17 August 2012)

Norbert Zeilberger (1 August 1969 – 17 August 2012) was an Austrian organist, harpsichordist and pianist.

== Living and career ==
Zeilberger, born in Brunnenthal near Schärding, studied the organ with August Humer at the Anton Bruckner Private University in Linz. From 1989, he continued his studies at the University of Music and Performing Arts Vienna in church music, organ with Alfred Mitterhofer, harpsichord with Wolfgang Glüxam and Gordon Murray fort. He completed his studies with honours and awards from the Federal Minister.

Zeilberger created numerous concerts and recordings, among others with early music ensembles such as Ars Antiqua Austria, Accentus Austria, moderntimes 1800, Armonico tributo Austria (conductor Lorenz Duftschmid) as well as the choir and orchestra of the J. S. Bach-Stiftung (conductor Rudolf Lutz).

His occupation with the Viennese fortepiano was also reflected in his extensive collection of historical Viennese grand piano from the time of the beginnings of piano building far into Romanticism.

Zeilberger taught at the Bruckner Conservatory (Anton Bruckner Private University since 2004) in Linz from 1994 and from 2000 at the Konservatorium der Stadt Wien. From 1994 to 2006, he worked as organist in the Protestant parish of A.B. Wien-Hietzing.

On 17 August 2012, Zeilberger died in an accident at the age of 43. On 27 August 2012, he was buried in Schardenberg. In November 2012, a memorial service was held in his honour in Alten Dom Linz and a memorial concert in the Linz Martin-Luther-Church.

== Prizes and awards ==
- Zeilberger's first recording of the sonatas by George Onslow for violin and fortepiano together with the violinist Ilia Korol was awarded a Diapason d'Or.

== Recordings ==
CDs

- Gregor Joseph Werner: Pro adventu. Quartette Nr. 2–6 & F-Dur, Cantilena pro Adventu "O Maria treib von dannen", Cantilena de immaculate "Ihr blumenreichen Felder", Cantilena pro Adventu "de immaculata conceptione", Aria "pro Dominica prima Adventus", Concerto a 5, Pastorale G-Dur für 2 Violinen. Alois Mühlnacher (Knabensoprano), Markus Miesenberger (tenor), Norbert Zeilberger (organ, harpsichord), Ars Antiqua Austria, Gunar Letzbor. Challenge, 2012.
- Joseph Balthasar Hochreither: Requiem. / Missa Jubilus sacer. With the St. Florianer Sängerknaben and Ars Antiqua Austria, dir.. Gunar Letzbor. Pan Classics 2012.
- Giovanni Antonio Pandolfi Mealli: Sonate a violino solo. With Gunar Letzbor, Ars Antiqua Austria. Arcana, 2010.
- Charles Mouton: The Mystery of Sign. Mouthon – 10 Concerti à 5. (for 2 violins, 2 altos and Basso continuo.) Norbert Zeilberger (organ) with Ars Antiqua Austria – Ensemble für Neue Barockmusik, conductor: Gunar Letzbor. Challenge Classics, 2010.
- George Onslow: Violinsonaten opus 16. moderntimes_1800. (Norbert Zeilberger an einem Fortepiano von Albrecht Czernin, 2006 / süddeutsch, c. 1850 sowie Ilia Korol, violin (anonym, norditalienisch, c. 1730).) Challenge Classics, 2008.
- Cantadas de Pasión. Works by Gaspar Sanz, Juan Hidalgo, Juan Cabanilles, Sebastián Durón among others, Maria Luz Alvarez (soprano), Norbert Zeilberger (organ), Accentus Austria, conductor Thomas Wimmer. Arcana, 2005.
- Antonio Maria Bononcini: Cantate in Soprano, 1708. With Radu Marian and Ars Antiqua Austria, Ltg. Gunar Letzbor. Arcana, 2004.
- Antonio Caldara: XII Sinfonie a quattro. With Ars Antiqua Austria, dir. Gunar Letzbor. Arcana, 2003.
- Antonio Bertali: Prothimia Suavissima – Parte II. With Ars Antiqua Austria, dir. Gunar Letzbor. Arcana, 2003.
- Benedikt Anton Aufschnaiter: Dulcis fidium harmonia. With Ars Antiqua Austria, dir. Gunar Letzbor. Arcana, 2002.
- Les maîtres de la vielle baroque. Werke von Dugue, Buterne, Dupuits, Naudot, Ravet, Marchand and Baton. With Matthias Loibner and Riccardo Delfino (hurdy-gurdy), Laurent Le Chenadec (bassoon), Thomas Wimmer (viola da gamba), Norbert Zeilberger (harsichord). CPO, 2002.
- Misteris de dolor. Geistliche Gesänge aus Katalonien und spanische Instrumentalpolyphonie aus dem 16. und 17. Jahrhundert. Maria Luz Alvarez (soprano), Norbert Zeilberger (organ), Accentus Austria, Leitung Thomas Wimmer. Pneuma, 2002.
- Georg Muffat: Nobilis juventus – Suites & Concertos. Norbert Zeilberger (organ and harpsichord), Armonico Tributo, Leitung Lorenz Duftschmid. CPO, 1999.
- Codex Faenza: Instrumental Music of the Early 15th Century. Norbert Zeilberger (organ), with the Ensemble Unicorn, dir. Michael Posch. Naxos, 1998.
- Johann Joseph Fux: Concentus Musico-Instrumentalis. Norbert Zeilberger (harpsichord), with Armonico Tributo Austria, Leitung Lorenz Duftschmid. Arcana, 1998.
- Georg Philipp Telemann: Viola da Gamba – Concertos, Quatuor, Sonates avec basse de viole soliste. Norbert Zeilberger (Cembalo und Truhenorgel) with Armonico Tributo Austria, conductor Lorenz Duftschmid. Arcana, 1997.

DVDs

- Johann Sebastian Bach: Kantaten BWV 1, 18, 22, 23, 26, 35, 42, 57, 61, 63, 66, 90, 93, 96, 97, 103, 108, 109, 125, 129, 135, 136, 138, 139, 140, 161, 173, 180, 185 und 191. Soloists, choir and orchestra of the J. S. Bach-Stiftung, Norbert Zeilberger (organ), conductor Rudolf Lutz. Je 1 DVD (with Konzertmitschnitt, Einführungsworkshop und Reflexion). J. S. Bach-Stiftung / Gallus Media, bis 2012.
  - Example: Johann Sebastian Bach: Geist und Seele wird verwirret. Cantata on the 12th Sunday after Trinitatis, BWV 35. Claude Eichenberger (mezzo-soprano), Norbert Zeilberger (organ), Orchestra of the J. S. Bach-Stiftung, conductor: Rudolf Lutz (harpsichord), Ulrike Landfester (Reflexion). DVD. J. S. Bach-Stiftung / Gallus Media, 2009.
