= Caterina Benedicta Grazianini =

Italian composer

Caterina Benedicta Grazianini (1685-1715) was an Italian composer of oratorios in Vienna. She was among the female composers of oratorios in Vienna who, according to Wellesz, were regular canonesses, rather than employed at the court. This group included Maria de Raschenau, Maria Margherita Grimani, and Camilla de Rossi. Grazianini is known only through her two surviving works, the oratorios S Gemignano vescovo e protettore di Modena (performed 1705 and 1715) and S Teresa. On one of these is a note to the effect that it was performed for the ladies of Modena and Brunswick, and was very well received. Her works are in two sections and an Italian overture, for four soloists and string orchestra.
