= Maria Anna de Raschenau =

Austrian composer and nun

- Born: 1650; Austria
- Died: 1714 (aged 63–64)
- Occupations: Composer, canoness
- Era: Baroque
- Known for: Oratorios and sacred music
- Notable work: Le sacre visioni di Santa Teresa

Maria Anna de Raschenau (1650-1714) was an Austrian composer and canoness (a type of Augustinian nun). She was active in Vienna, but was not a member or servant of the noble court.

Raschenau's father was employed by the imperial court, which allowed her to have a well-rounded education. This is where her talents in singing and composition were first noticed. She was the choirmaster at the convent of St Jakob auf der Hülben in Vienna.

Raschenau wrote an oratorio on a libretto by MA Signorini, Le sacre visioni di Santa Teresa, which was first performed on 20 March 1703. The score was once in the Österreichische Nationalbibliothek, but was not in the catalogue by 1991, and is assumed to be lost. Her two oratorios and two secular works written for the state are now only known from libretti given out at performances. Raschenau was a contemporary of fellow female oratorio-writers Caterina Benedicta Grazianini, Maria Grimani, and Camilla de Rossi, who were also canonesses.
