= Giovanni Cima =

Giovanni Cima may refer to:

- Giovanni Paolo Cima, composer and organist
- Cima da Conegliano (Giovanni Battista Cima), painter
