= Maria Margherita Grimani =

Italian composer

Maria Margherita Grimani (1680 – c.1720) was an Italian composer who, at some points in her life, was active in Vienna. Among her compositions was the first opera by a woman to be performed at the Vienna court theater. She may have lived at the noble court for periods between 1713 and 1718; however, she was not employed at the court as a musician. She may also have been one of a number of women composers at the Viennese court who were canonesses, a type of Augustinian nun; others included Caterina Benedicta Grazianini, Maria de Raschenau, and Camilla de Rossi.

She was born Maria Margherita Vitalini, and married Giovanni Andrea Grimani (1672 - 1723), Doctor of Law, lawyer and lecturer at the University of Bologna from 1696 until his death. He wrote several legal works as well as some poetry and a wedding song for the marriage of senator Piriteo Malvezzi, Marquis of Castel Guelfo, and the Marquise Artemisia Magnani in 1696.

Maria Margherita Grimani's known works include an opera, specifically a componimento dramatico or opus dramaticum, which may or may not have been staged, Pallade e Marte, dedicated in Bologna on April 5, 1713, and first performed at the imperial theater on the nameday of Emperor Charles VI on November 4, 1713, at the imperial theater. It was scored for two voices, oboe and string orchestra.

Her oratorios were also performed at the imperial theater: La visitazione di Elisabetta, performed in 1713 and again in 1718, and La decollazione di S Giovanni Battista, performed in 1715. The librettists are unknown. Both celebrate Charles's military success against the "infidels".

All of Grimani's works use small forces—two singers, a couple of obbligato instruments, and a continuo group, including cello and theorbo. Their form follows the standards of the time, as exemplified in Alessandro Scarlatti's works. This included a number of da capo arias with ritornelli and recitative secco.
