= Markus Forster =

German opera singer

- Born: Innsbruck
- Education: Mozarteum
- Occupation: Classical countertenor

Markus Forster is a classical singer of the voice types altus and countertenor, especially in Early music and Baroque music.

Born in Innsbruck, Forster studied at the Mozarteum, where he graduated with the concert exam in 1995. He recorded several works by Johann Sebastian Bach with various conductors and ensembles, namely his cantatas with the J. S. Bach-Stiftung in St. Gallen of conductor Rudolf Lutz.
