= Les Escapades =

German chamber music ensemble

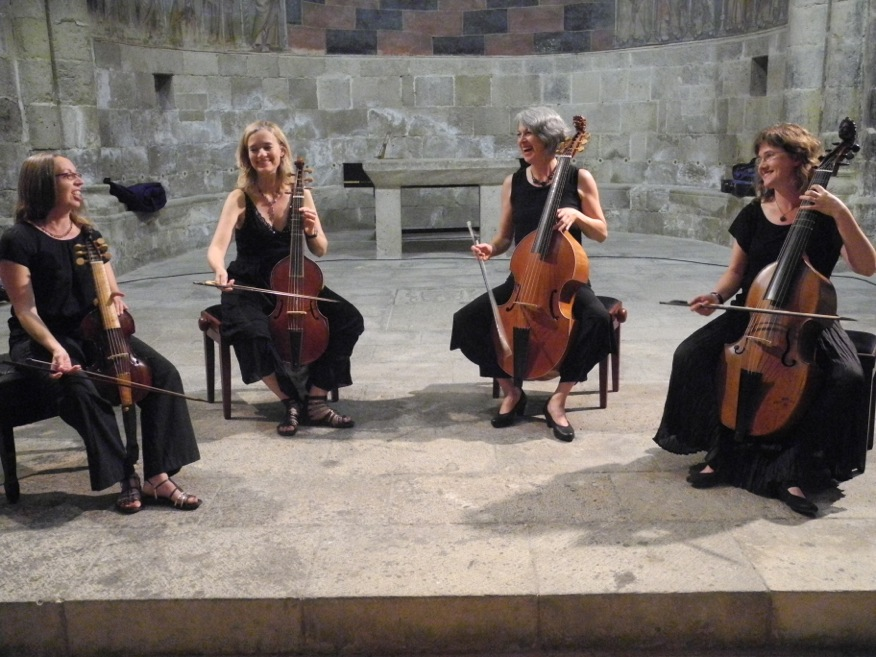
Les Escapades

Les Escapades is a German ensemble for early music established in 2000 in Karlsruhe, Germany. The four viola da gamba players, Sabine Kreutzberger, Franziska Finckh, Adina Scheyhing and Barbara Pfeifer, studied in The Hague, Basel and Trossingen. They play in the instrumentation as pure Gambenconsort or in cooperation with other artists or choirs. The name of the ensemble promises unexpected access to the musical world of Renaissance and Baroque music.

== Repertoire ==
Les Escapades give concerts with a wide range of repertoire. This includes the classical English consort of instruments of the 16th and 17th centuries. works and arrangements of Spanish music by the Siglo de Oro or numerous German sacred works, including participation in performances of Dietrich Buxtehude's Membra Jesu nostri. A special feature presented in the production Les Escapades du Roi: Based on the fictional adventures of a young woman at the court of the "Sun King" Louis XIV, the courtly music of the Palace of Versailles. The ensemble also took part in productions of the SWR.

== Recordings ==
- Ich will in Friede fahren - Geistliche Musik, with Franz Vitzthum, Christophorus (2009)
- Les Escapades du Roy - Liebe & Intrige am Hof zu Versailles, Christophorus (2010)
- Volkslieder Vol. 1 - Exklusive Volksliedersammlung, SWR Liederprojekt (track 15 and 30), Carus (2010)
- Volkslieder Vol. 2 - Exklusive Volksliedersammlung, SWR Liederprojekt (track 11), Carus (2011)
- Weihnachtslieder Vol. 1 SWR Liederprojekt (track 6 and 21), Carus (2012)
- Fabulous London - Englische Musik für Gambenconsort von Jenkins, Mico, Simpson, Gibbons, Bassano, Byrd, Holborne, Ferrabosco, Hume, Anonymus, Bull, Locke, Christophorus (2013)
- Dass sich wunder alle Welt - Lieder zum Advent, with Miriam Feuersinger and Daniel Schreiber, Christophorus (2015)
- Flores españolas - Music for Viol Consort and Guitar, with Maria Ferré, Christophorus (2018)
- Johann Rosenmüller et al.: Habe deine Lust an dem Herren - Geistliche Konzerte, with Miriam Feuersinger, Christophorus (2018)
