= Domenico Merola =

Italian composer

Domenico Merola was an Italian composer. In 1744, he was named First Organist for the Chapel Royal of Naples. He also became the choirmaster at San Domenico Maggiore.

== Recordings ==
- Sacred Salterio - Lamentations of the Holy Week Miriam Feuersinger (soprano) and Franziska Fleischanderl (salterio & direction) Il Dolce Conforto
