= Ärgre dich, o Seele, nicht, BWV 186 =

Church cantata by Johann Sebastian Bach

Ärgre dich, o Seele, nicht
- BWV: 186a; 186
- Church cantata by J. S. Bach
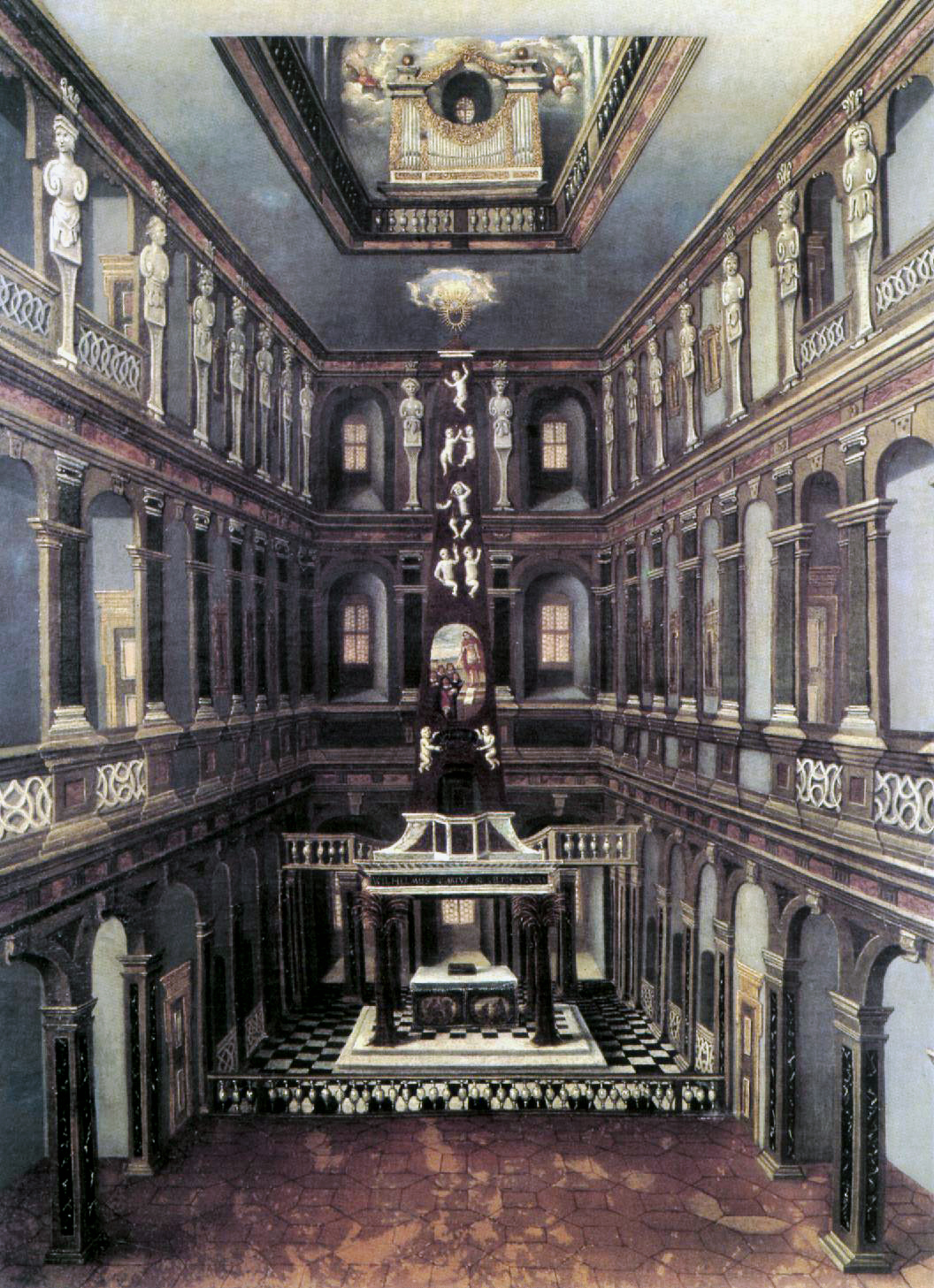
- The Schlosskirche in Weimar
- Occasion: Third Sunday of Advent (186a); Seventh Sunday after Trinity (186)
- Cantata text: Salomo Franck; anonymous
- Chorale: by Ludwig Helmbold (186a); Es ist das Heil uns kommen her (186)
- Performed: 13 December 1716: Weimar; 11 July 1723: Leipzig
- Movements: eleven in two parts; originally six
- Vocal: SATB choir and solo
- Instrumental: 2 oboes; taille; bassoon; 2 violins; viola; continuo

Ärgre dich, o Seele, nicht (Do not be confounded, o soul), BWV 186 is a church cantata by Johann Sebastian Bach. He composed it originally in Weimar in 1716 for Advent, BWV 186a, and expanded it in Leipzig in 1723 for the seventh Sunday after Trinity, where he first performed it on 11 July 1723.

== History and words ==
=== Weimar ===
The prescribed readings for the Third Sunday of Advent were from the First Epistle to the Corinthians, the ministry of faithful apostles (1 Corinthians 4:1–5), and from the Gospel of Matthew, John the Baptist in prison (Matthew 11:2–10). The cantata is based on a cantata text written by Salomo Franck for the third Sunday of Advent, published in Evangelische Sonn- und Fest-Tages-Andachten in 1717. His lyrics contained movements 1, 3, 5, 8, 10 of the later work and a different closing chorale of Ludwig Helmbold. Bach composed the music, BWV 186a, in 1716 in Weimar, where he first performed it on 13 December 1716.

1. Chorus: Ärgre dich, o Seele, nicht (movement 1 of BWV 186)
2. Aria 1: Bist du, der da kommen soll (3)
3. Aria 2: Messias läßt sicjh merken (5)
4. Aria 3: Die Armen will der Herr umarmen (8)
5. Aria 4: Laß Seele, kein Leiden (10)
6. Chorale: Darum, ob ich schon dulde

A reconstruction of the cantata by Diethard Hellmann was published in 1963.

=== Leipzig ===
As Leipzig observed tempus clausum (time of silence) from Advent II to Advent IV, Bach could not perform the cantata there in Advent and expanded it to a cantata in two parts for the Seventh Sunday after Trinity, as he had expanded Herz und Mund und Tat und Leben, BWV 147, just before for 2 July 1723. He added recitatives, changed the words of the arias slightly, replaced the closing chorale by verse 11 of the chorale "Es ist das Heil uns kommen her" (1523) of Paul Speratus, and added verse 12 of that chorale to close part 1 of the cantata.

The prescribed readings for the Sunday are from the Epistle to the Romans, "the wages of sin is death; but the gift of God is eternal life" (Romans 6:19–23), and from the Gospel of Mark, the feeding of the 4000 (Mark 8:1–9). The recitatives mention that by stressing terms as Hunger (hunger) and schmecket und sehet (taste and see).

== Scoring and structure ==
The cantata is scored for four soloists and a four-part choir SATB, two oboes, taille (tenor oboe), two violins, viola and basso continuo including bassoon. Its eleven movements are in two parts, movements 1 to 6 to be performed before the sermon, the others after the sermon.

1. Chorus: Ärgre dich, o Seele, nicht
2. Recitative (bass): Die Knechtsgestalt, die Not, der Mangel
3. Aria (bass): Bist du, der mir helfen soll
4. Recitative (tenor): Ach, daß ein Christ so sehr
5. Aria (tenor): Mein Heiland läßt sich merken
6. Chorale: Ob sichs anließ, als wollt er nicht

After the sermon:

7. Recitative (tenor): Es ist die Welt die große Wüstenei
8. Aria (soprano): Die Armen will der Herr umarmen
9. Recitative (alto): Nun mag die Welt mit ihrer Lust vergehen
10. Aria (soprano, alto): Laß, Seele, kein Leiden
11. Chorale: Die Hoffnung wart' der rechten Zeit

== Music ==
The opening chorus is in rondo form, A B A B A. Section A treats the first line of the poem, section B lines 2 to 4. Section A is a complex combination of instrumental and vocal composition. The instruments open with a sinfonia of 8 measures, followed by a short vocal Devise (statement) which is repeated by the orchestra, and only then a fugal development begins, the vocal parts sometimes embedded in material from the sinfonia. The first repeat of section A is shortened in the sinfonia, the second repeat starts with the fugal part right away. In great contrast section B is set a cappella (only accompanied by the continuo) and partly homophonic.

The scoring of the four arias shows increasing complexity and also a rise from the lowest voice to the higher one, soprano and alto coming in only in the second part. The first aria is accompanied only by the continuo, the two next ones in a trio setting, and the final aria is a duet with orchestra. It resembles a gigue, and the voices, singing "Laß, Seele, kein Leiden von Jesu dich scheiden" (My soul, let no sorrow separate you from Jesus), illustrate the meaning by mostly parallel movement.

The four recitatives all end as an arioso.

The chorale movements 6 and 11, ending the two parts of the cantata, are the same music, a chorale fantasia. The chorale is embedded in a concerto of the orchestra, the cantus firmus is given to the soprano, whereas the lower voices sing counterpoint in faster movement, sometimes in imitation.

== Recordings ==
- Die Bach Kantate Vol. 43, Helmuth Rilling, Gächinger Kantorei, Bach-Collegium Stuttgart, Arleen Augér, Helen Watts, Kurt Equiluz, Philippe Huttenlocher, Hänssler 1977
- J. S. Bach: Das Kantatenwerk – Sacred Cantatas Vol. 10, Nikolaus Harnoncourt, Tölzer Knabenchor, Concentus Musicus Wien, Helmut Wittek (soloist of the Tölzer Knabenchor), Paul Esswood, Kurt Equiluz, Robert Holl, Teldec 1989
- J. S. Bach: Complete Cantatas Vol. 6, Ton Koopman, Amsterdam Baroque Orchestra & Choir, Ruth Ziesak, Elisabeth von Magnus, Paul Agnew, Klaus Mertens, Antoine Marchand 1997
- J. S. Bach: Cantatas Vol. 10 – Cantatas from Leipzig 1723 III, Masaaki Suzuki, Bach Collegium Japan, Miah Persson, Robin Blaze, Makoto Sakurada, Peter Kooy, BIS 1999
- Bach Edition Vol. 12 – Cantatas Vol. 6, Pieter Jan Leusink, Holland Boys Choir, Netherlands Bach Collegium, Ruth Holton, Sytse Buwalda, Knut Schoch, Bas Ramselaar, Brilliant Classics 1999
- J. S. Bach: Cantatas Vol. 4, John Eliot Gardiner, Monteverdi Choir, English Baroque Soloists, Katharine Fuge, Richard Wyn Roberts, Kobie van Rensburg, Stephan Loges, Soli Deo Gloria 2000

== Sources ==
- Ärgre dich, o Seele, nicht, BWV 186: Scores at the International Music Score Library Project
- Ärgre dich, o Seele, nicht BWV 186; BC A 108 / Sacred cantata (3rd Sunday of Advent) Bach Digital
- Ärgre dich, o Seele, nicht BWV 186; BC A 108 / Sacred cantata (7th Sunday after Trinity) Bach Digital
- Cantata BWV 186 Ärgre dich, o Seele, nicht history, scoring, sources for text and music, translations to various languages, discography, discussion, Bach Cantatas Website
- Cantata BWV 186a Ärgre dich, o Seele, nicht history, scoring, sources for text and music, translations to various languages, discography, discussion, Bach Cantatas Website
- BWV 186 Ärgre dich, o Seele, nicht English translation, University of Vermont
- BWV 186 Ärgre dich, o Seele, nicht text, scoring, University of Alberta
