= Ludwig Helmbold =

Lutheran poet and hymnist (1532-1598)

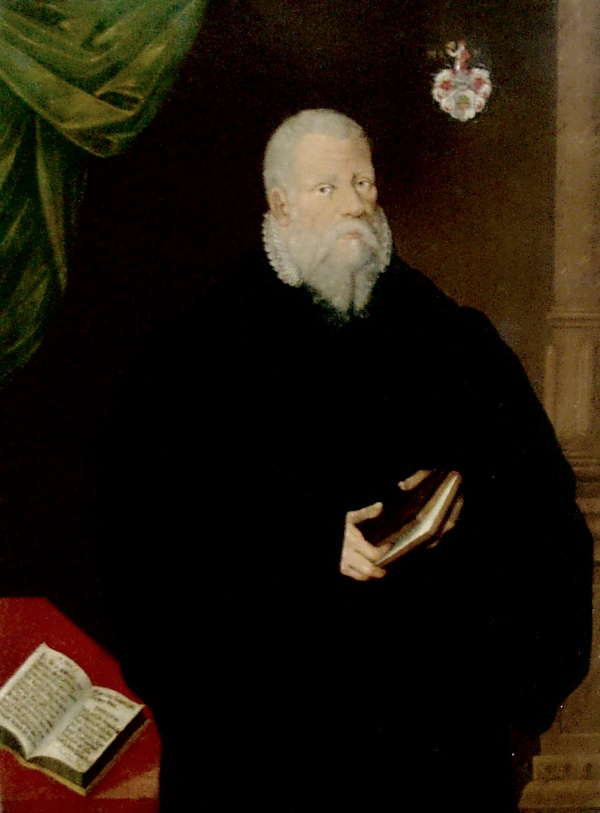
- Born: 21 January 1532; Mühlhausen, Holy Roman Empire
- Died: 8 April 1598 (aged 66)
- Occupations: Poet; Philosopher; Ecclesiastical minister
- Known for: Lutheran hymns

Ludwig Helmbold, also spelled Ludwig Heimbold, (21 January 1532 – 8 April 1598) was a poet of Lutheran hymns. He is probably best known for his hymn "Nun laßt uns Gott dem Herren", of which J. S. Bach used the fifth stanza for his cantata O heilges Geist- und Wasserbad, BWV 165; Bach also used his words in BWV 73, 79 and 186a.

== Biography ==
Helmbold was born in Mühlhausen. He became a professor of Philosophy at Erfurt University in 1554. In 1571 he was appointed a minister at the Marienkirche in Mühlhausen, later as Superintendent.

Helmbold was crowned poeta laureatus by Maximilian II, Holy Roman Emperor, in 1566 on the Reichstag at Augsburg.

== Hymns ==
The Mühlhausen cantors Joachim a Burck and Johannes Eccard set many of Helmbold's more than hundred hymns to music. Some of his works were used by Johann Sebastian Bach in his cantatas, such as

- Herr, wie du willt, so schicks mit mir, BWV 73
- Gott der Herr ist Sonn und Schild, BWV 79
- Ärgre dich, o Seele, nicht, BWV 186a
- O heilges Geist- und Wasserbad, BWV 165.

A few of his hymns are still included in the German Protestant hymnal Evangelisches Gesangbuch (EG):

- EG 320: "Nun lasst uns Gott, dem Herren"
- EG 365: "Von Gott will ich nicht lassen" (Also in Evangelical Lutheran Hymnary, #465)
- EG (Nordelbien) 558: "Amen, Gott Vater und Sohne"

== Other works ==
Hembold also wrote Latin texts for two publications of Italian vocal music (by Adrian Willaert, Francesco Corteccia, and others), which were intended for use in Latin schools in Germany: Cantiones suavissime (1576 and 1580), edited by the Magdeburg cantor Leonhardt Schröter. The music was considered exquisite, but the texts were deemed too secular, and thus Hembold wrote new, didactic texts to fit the music. Some of these new texts traveled far and wide; for example one of the pieces in the 1576 volume, Ecce bonum licet, eventually found its way to Iceland and was sung there in Icelandic translation (Vera mátt góður) as late as the 1660s.

== Other recognition ==
In 1998, a street named Helmboldstraße, next to Bonatstraße, was named after him in Mühlhausen.

== Literature ==
- Waldtraut-Ingeborg Sauer-Geppert (1969). "Helmbold, Ludwig". Neue Deutsche Biographie (in German). Vol. 8. Berlin: Duncker & Humblot. pp. 492–493. (full text online).
- Heinrich Julius Kämmel (1880). "Helmbold, Ludwig" . Allgemeine Deutsche Biographie (in German). Vol. 11. Leipzig: Duncker & Humblot. pp. 701–702.
- Friedrich Wilhelm Bautz (1990). "Helmbold, Ludwig". In Bautz, Friedrich Wilhelm (ed.). Biographisch-Bibliographisches Kirchenlexikon (BBKL) (in German). Vol. 2. Hamm: Bautz. cols. 705–706. ISBN 3-88309-032-8.
- Stephen Rose (2016). "Patriotic Purification: Cleansing Italian Secular Vocal Music in Thuringia, 1575-1600." Early Music History 35, pp. 203–260.
- Árni Heimir Ingólfsson (2023). "A Devotional Song from Iceland." In Borghetti, Vincenzo (ed). The Museum of Renaissance Music: A History in 100 Exhibits. Turnhout: Brepols. pp. 47–50.
