= Chapel Royal of Naples =

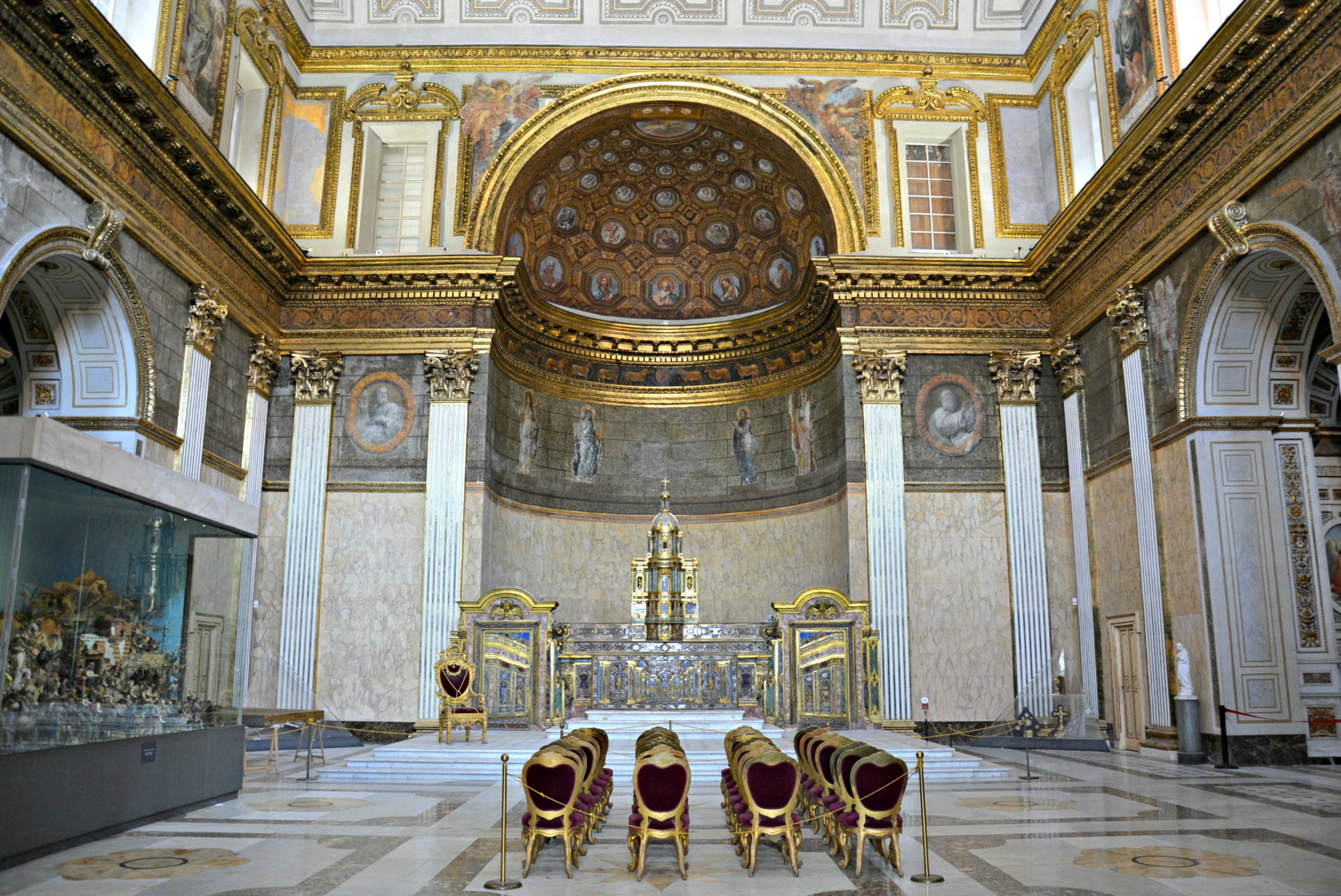
The chapel.

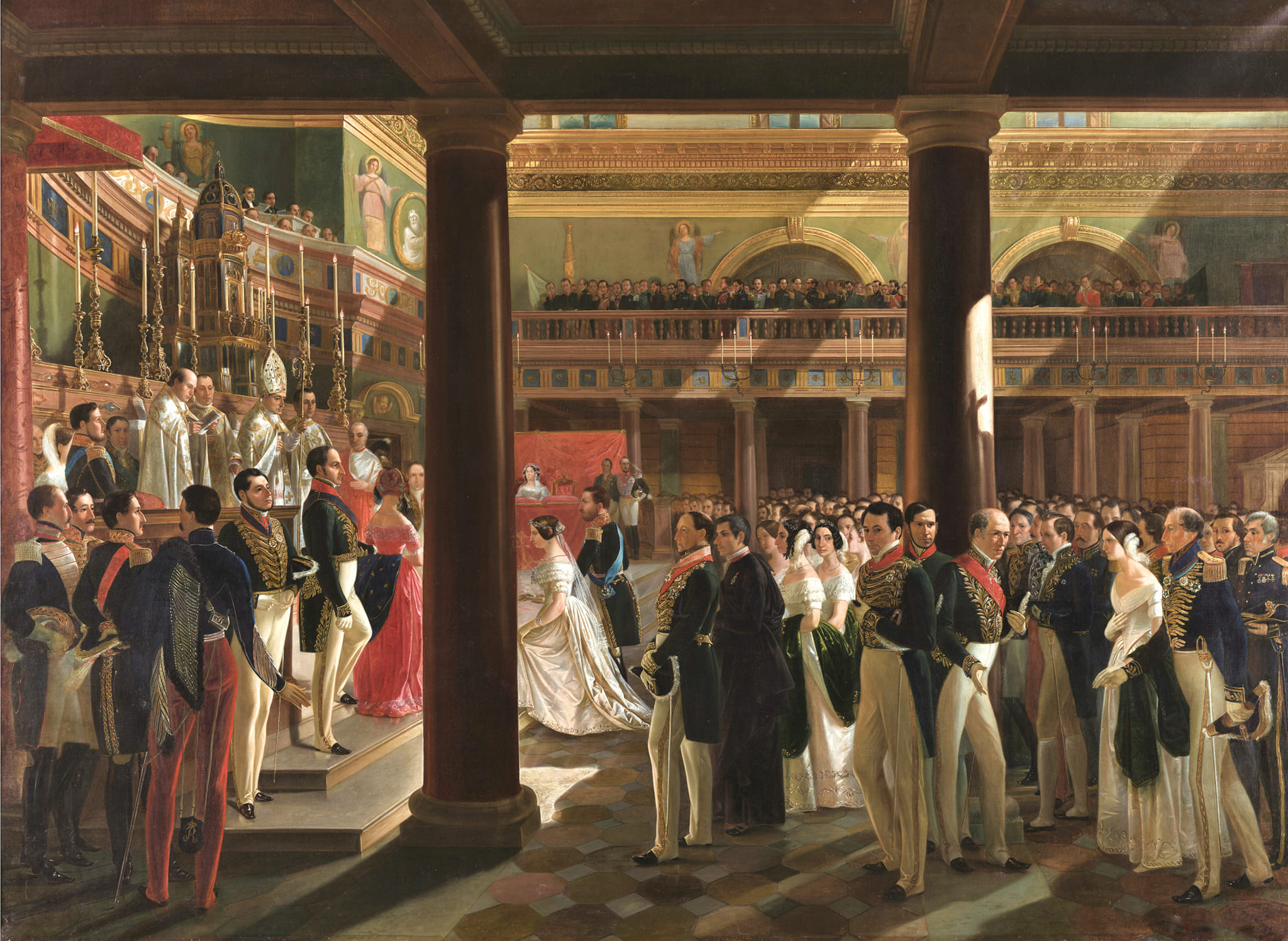
The wedding by proxy of Princess Teresa Cristina of the Two Sicilies to Emperor Pedro II of Brazil in the chapel, 1843

The Chapel Royal of Naples (Italian: Cappella Palatina or Cappella Reale dell'Assunta) was the sacred musical establishment of the Spanish court in Naples which began with the Aragonese Court of Naples, and continued under the Habsburgs the Bourbons, and Joseph Bonaparte.

== Maestri di cappella, vice masters and organists ==
Masters of the chapel included:

- The first maestro Diego Ortiz arrived in the entourage of Viceroy Pedro de Toledo (1558-1570),
- Francisco Martínez de Loscos (1570-?),
- a Flemish maestro,
- then another Fleming Giovanni de Macque (1599–1614),
- the first Italian Giovanni Maria Trabaci (1614–46),
- the Neapolitans Andrea Falconieri (1647–56), and
- Filippo Coppola (1658–80),
- then the Venetian Pietro Andrea Ziani (1680–84),
- followed by Alessandro Scarlatti (1684-1702, then again 1708-25),
- alternating in his absences with Francesco Mancini (1702-1708, then again 1725-1737),
- Domenico Sarro (1737–1744),
- Leonardo Leo (1744),
- then Giuseppe de Majo (1745–1771),
- Pasquale Cafaro (1771–1787),
- Paisiello (1787-)

Vice masters included Domenico Sarro (-1707, then again 1725 to 1734). And in the third post of Pro-Vice Maestro from 1725 Leonardo Vinci. Francesco Provenzale was only maestro onorario.

Organists included Leonardo Leo and Domenico Merola.

== See also ==
- Neapolitan School
- Royal Palace of Naples
