= Dario Castello =

Italian composer

Dario Castello (bapt. 19 October 1602, Venice – 2 July 1631, Venice) was an Italian composer and violinist from the early Baroque period who worked and published in Venice. As a composer, he was a late member of the Venetian School and had a role in the transformation of the instrumental canzona into the sonata.

== Biographical details ==
Dario Domenico Castello was born in Venice, where he was baptised on 19 October 1602.

The title page of the 1621 edition of the first volume of the Sonate Concertate in stil moderno records him as Capo di Compagnia de Musichi d'Instrumenti da fiato in Venetia, indicating that he led a Venetian company of piffari, a band that could include sackbuts, cornetts, shawms, but also violins and viols.
On 19 November 1624, he was appointed «sonador di violin» (violin player) of the St. Mark's music chapel, at the time headed by Claudio Monteverdi.

The title page of the second volume (1629) of the "Sonate concertate in Stil moderno" lists him as Musico Della Serenissima Signoria di Venetia in S. Marco, & Capo di Compagnia de Instrumenti, indicating that he worked at the great Basilica of St. Mark's where Claudio Monteverdi was maestro di capella. Castello's use of the stile concitato (agitated style) — with quick repeated-note figures— is consistent with his association with Monteverdi.

His brother Francesco (trombonist) and his father Giovanni Battista (violinist) were also working at St Mark's.

Dario Castello died in Venice on 2 July 1631 during the great plague of 1630.

== Style ==
Of his music, 29 separate compositions survive. Castello's music is inventive and technically challenging. Strictly worked polyphonic sections alternate with dramatic recitatives over basso continuo, in keeping with the title of the publications "in stil moderno"; however, he also uses some of the older canzona technique, which uses short sections of highly contrasting texture, and active rather than lyrical melodic lines. Unusually for the time, Castello often specifies the instruments for each part, calling for cornetti, violins, sackbuts and dulcians. That these works were still being reprinted in the 1650s attests to Castello's influence. Modern editions of the complete sonatas are published by Ut Orpheus Edizione.

== Works ==
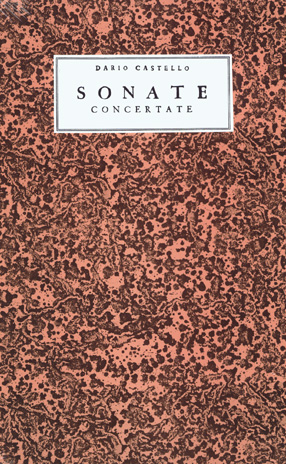
Cover of a facsimile of Dario Castello's "Sonate Concertate in Stil Moderno per Sonar nel Organo overo Spineta, Libro Primo, V".

- Sonate Concertate in Stil Moderno, Libro I, Venice, 1621
- Sonate Concertate in Stil Moderno, Libro II, Venice, 1629
- Exultate Deo, motet (Ghirlanda sacra 1625 and 1636).

== Recordings ==
- The Floating City, His Majesty's Sagbutts and Cornetts, Hyperion CDA67013.
- Viaggio Musicale, Il Giardino Armonico, Teldec 8573825362.
- Dario Castello Sonate, Ensemble La Capriola, Mieroprint EM 6005.
- Dario Castello: Sonata Quarta a2, Reversio, (6-2 studio/REVERSIO. Catalog number: 6-2STD-CD013)
- Falla con misuras - 15th-17th Century Italian Chamber Music, Reversio,(6-2 studio/REVERSIO. Catalog number: 6-2STD-CD008)
- Sonata Concertate - Book I The Academy of Ancient Music dir Richard Egarr, Catalog number: AAM005
- Sonata Concertate, Europa Galante dir Fabio Biondi (Label Opus 111, 1992))
- Sonate concertate in stil moderno, Ensemble Musica Fiorita, Daniela Dolci (Label Tactus, 2006)
- Sonate concertate in stil moderno, John Holloway, Lars Ulrik Mortensen, Jane Gower (Label ECM, 2010)
