= Wolfgang Sauseng =

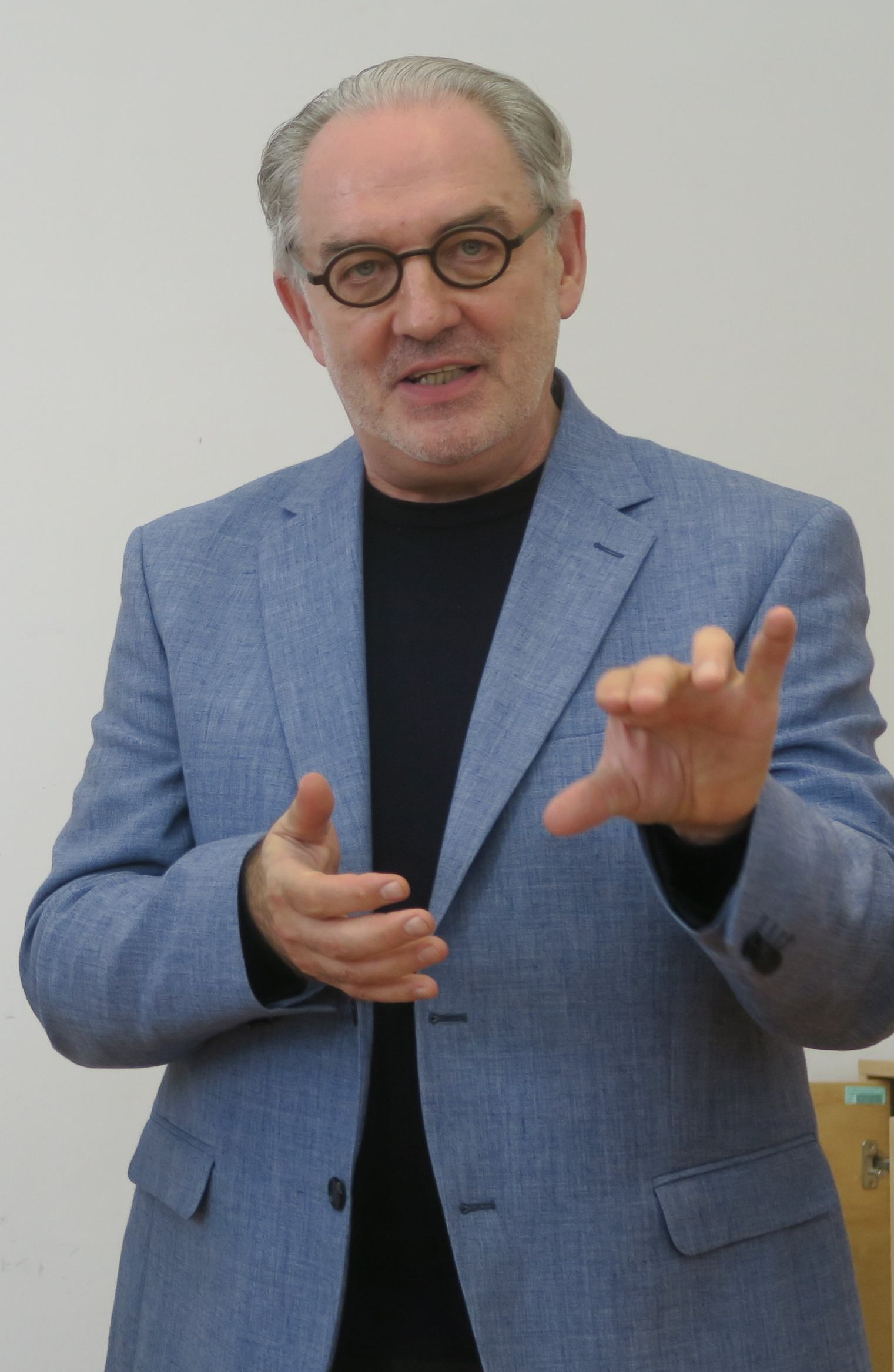
Sauseng, 2018

Wolfgang Sauseng (born Graz, July 6, 1956) is an Austrian composer, conductor and organist.

== Discography ==
- Sauseng: ...in grünen Stein geschlossen; Mondgott
