= Cosimo Stawiarski =

Italian classical violinist

Cosimo Stawiarski (born 1974) is an Italian classical violinist and music editor, focused on music of the late 17th and early 18th century.

== Life ==
Born in Copertino, Stawiarski studied Baroque violin at the University of the Arts Bremen, with Chiara Banchini at the Schola Cantorum Basiliensis and with Lucy van Dael at the Sweelinck Konservatorium Amsterdam. He also studied musicology at the Christian-Albrechts-Universität zu Kiel.

The main focus of his work is the research and performance of North and Central German music of the late 17th and early 18th century. He has played with Jordi Savall, Hermann Max, Frieder Bernius, Paul Goodwin and Howard Arman. He has also performed with the Lautten Compagney, the Leipziger Barockorchester, the ensemble Capriccio Basel, La Chapelle Rhénane and the Johann-Rosenmüller-Ensemble. He is a permanent member of the ensemble Les Cornets Noirs. The latter has made a recording of works by Giovanni Legrenzi, which has been awarded record prizes.

As a music editor, he and his publishing house Musica Poetica focus on less-known vocal and instrumental music of the 17th and 18th centuries, often making works accessible again for musical performance.
