= Konrad Hummler =

Swiss private banker (born 1953)

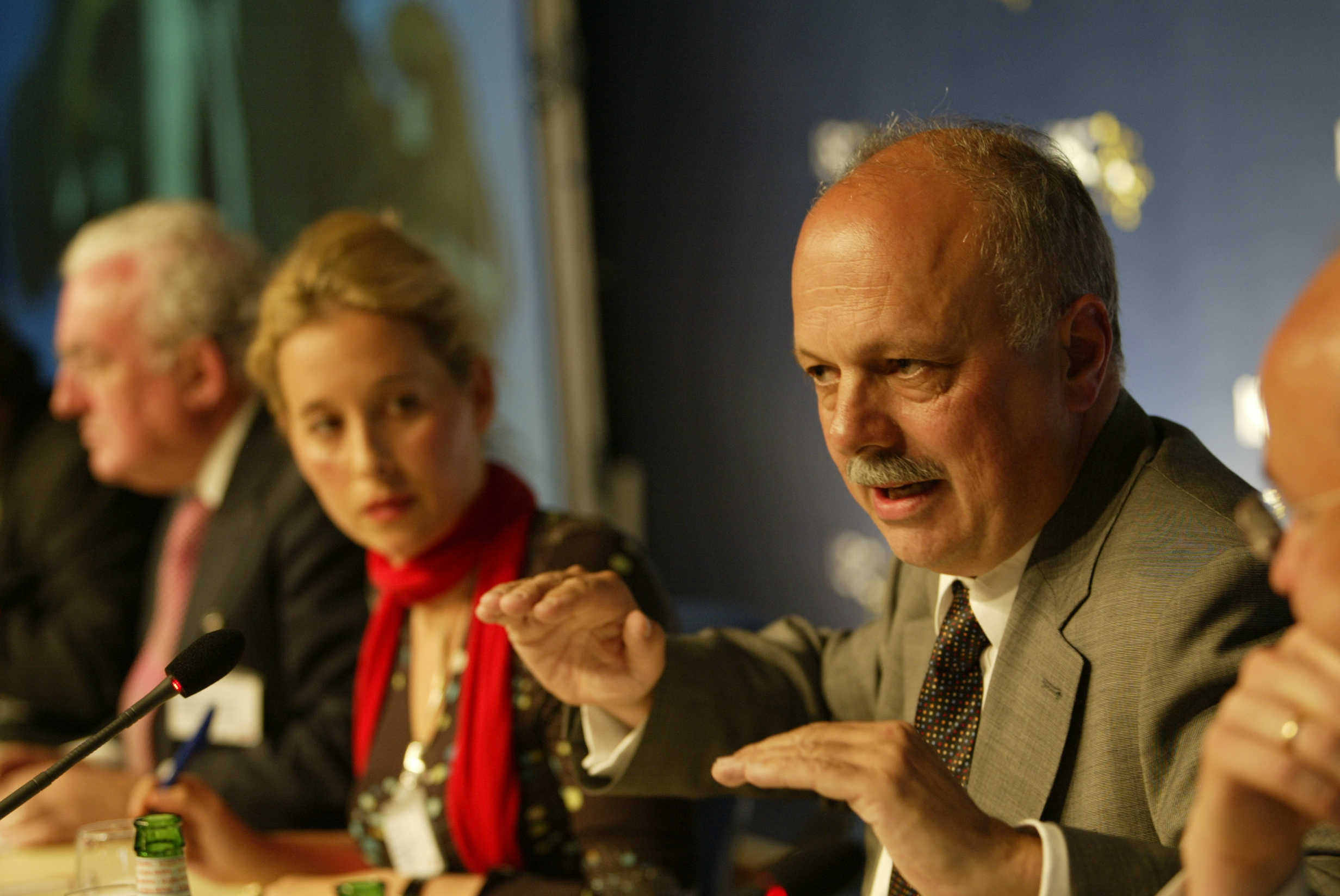
- Born: Konrad Hummler; March 13, 1953 (age 73); St. Gallen, Switzerland
- Education: University of Zurich (Licentiate); University of Rochester (MBA)
- Title: Former chairman and partner of Wegelin & Co.
- Spouse: Liesbeth Streefkerk
- Children: 4

Konrad Hummler (born 13 March 1953 in St. Gallen) is a Swiss businessman, publicist and former private banker.

== Early life and education ==
Hummler had a bourgeois upbringing in the city of St. Gallen. He was the son of former national councillor and attorney Alfred Hummler (1915-2010) and Verena (née Stucki). He completed his Matura at Kantonsschule am Burggraben before studying law at University of Zurich (doctorate) and economics at the University of Rochester in Rochester, New York (MBA). After his studies he launched his banking career at Swiss Bank Corporation (today's UBS) in 1981. Initially, as a financial analyst and later as personal assistant to chairman Robert Holzach. In 1989, he began to work for Wegelin & Co. and subsequently became a Managing Partner in 1991 until its demise in 2012.

He has also been a board member of the Swiss Bankers Association until 2004. From 2004, he was a council member of Swiss National Bank and the German Stock Exchange. From 2008-11 he was also president of the Swiss Private Bankers Association. Between 2002-11 he had been a board member of Neue Zürcher Zeitung, being elected president from 2011-12, remaining a member until his resignation in 2013. Until 2011 he was president of the Chamber of Industry and Commerce St. Gallen-Appenzell. Since 2010, Hummler is a board member of Bühler Group in Uzwil. He is chairman of M1 AG, a private think tank for strategic time questions as well as of satirical magazine Nebelspalter, and Private Client Bank in Zürich.

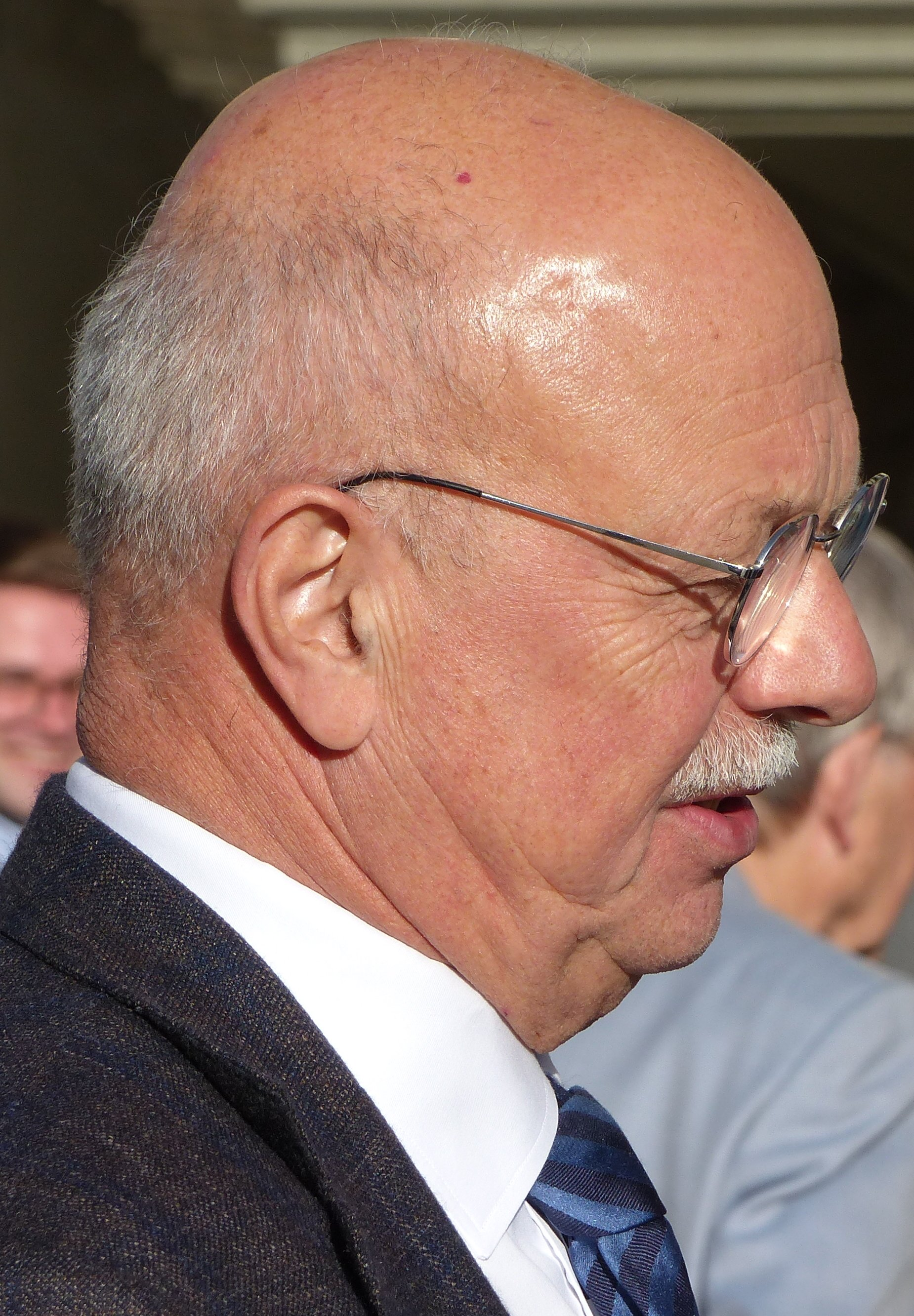
Konrad Hummler in 2024

Hummler is also active as benefactor and philanthropist. He has founded the J.S. Bach Foundation in St. Gallen with his own means which he currently chairs.

== Private ==
Hummler is married to Liesbeth (née Streefkerk) and resides in Teufen, Canton of Appenzell Ausserrhoden, Switzerland. The couple has four daughters.

In the Swiss Armed Forces he held the position of Colonel of the General Staff.

== Works ==
- Versuch, Irrtum, Deutung – Anlagekommentare 1990 bis 2010. Orell Füssli, Zürich 2011, ISBN 978-3-280-05424-6.

== Literature ==
- Crésus: Confessions d’un banquier pourri. Librairie Arthème Fayard, Paris 2009.
