= Martin Rinkart =

German Lutheran clergyman and hymnist

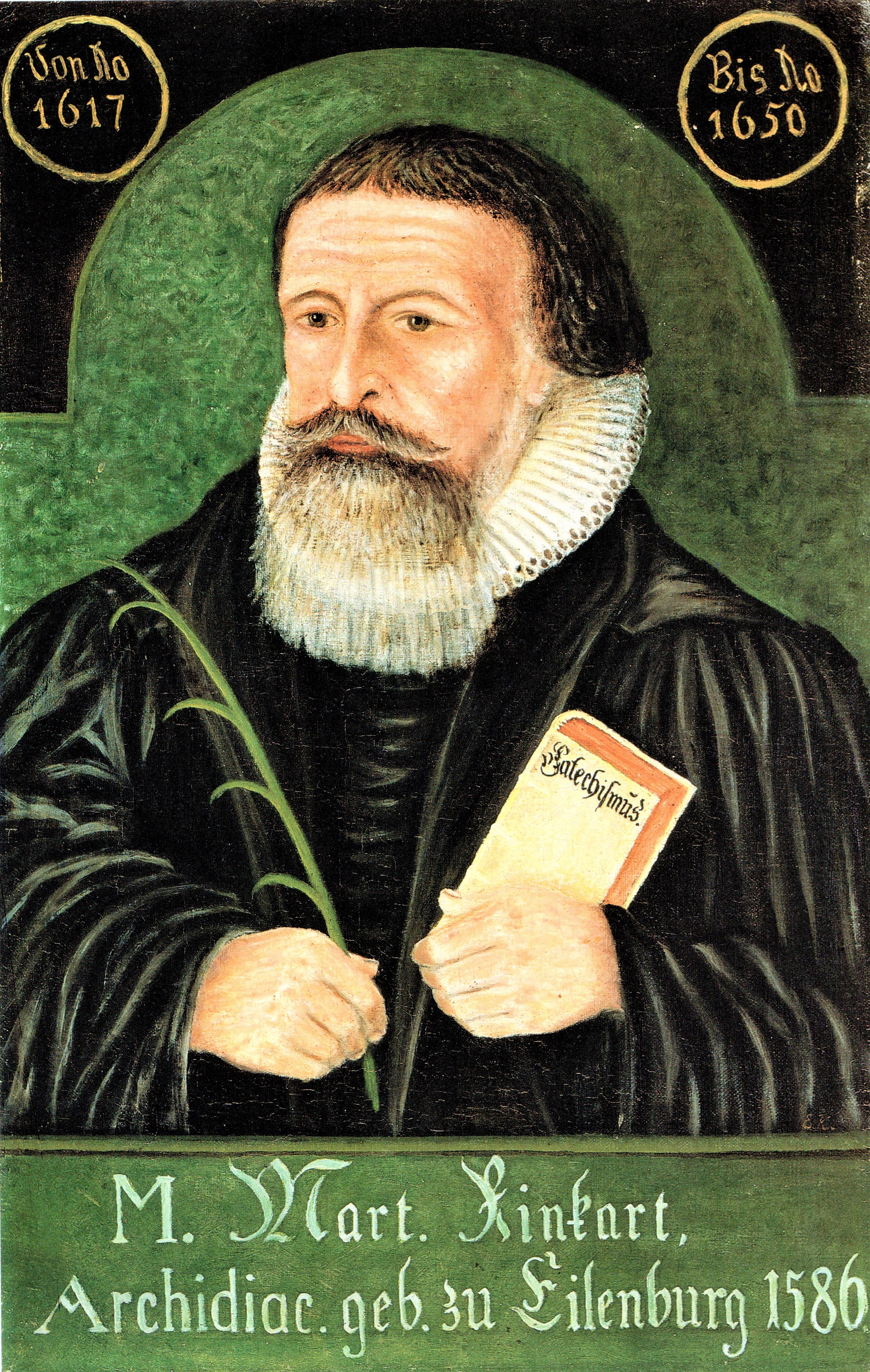
Martin Rinkart (1586–1649)

Martin Rinkart, or Rinckart (23 April 1586, Eilenburg – 8 December 1649) was a German Lutheran clergyman and hymnist. He is best known for the text to "Nun danket alle Gott" ("Now thank we all our God") which was written c. 1636. It was set to music by Johann Crüger about 1647, and translated into English in the 19th century by Catherine Winkworth.

Rinkart was a deacon at Eisleben and archdeacon at Eilenburg, where he was born and also died. He served there during the Thirty Years' War and a severe plague in 1637.

== Hymns ==
- Nun danket alle Gott (Now thank we all our God)
- 'Rinkart' is the name of a tune written by Johann Sebastian Bach for the hymn 'Christ is the world's true Light' by G. W. Briggs (New English Hymnal 494).
