= Michelangelo Grancini =

Italian composer

Michel’Angelo Grancini (Grancino, born in Milan, 1605; died in Milan, April 17, 1669) was an Italian organist and composer. Grancini composed sacred music. Nineteen volumes were published in Milan (1622–29). Some 200 works are at the Milan Cathedral.

Grancini composed religious music almost exclusively, both in 'stile antico' and 'stile moderno'. His vocal writing reflected the seventeenth century, with Monteverdian derivations. His instrumental music shows the characteristics of the sixteenth-century sonata, joining it to the Gabrieli tradition.

== Legacy ==
Iesuè wrote (translated from Italian):

The birth date of this organist and composer is deduced as 1605 on the basis of Picinelli's statement: "at the age of 17 [...] he began to publish his works." His first work was published in 1622, when he was already an organist in the church of S. Maria del Paradiso, a well-to-do parish of the old centre of Milan. Nothing is known about his early education but it is likely he was a pupil of Milanese composer Giovanni Domenico Rognoni Taeggio. In 1624 he moved to the church of S. Sepolcro as an organist, where he remained until 1628-29, when he was employed as organist in the church of S. Ambrogio. On 29 Dec. 1630 he was elected organist at the cathedral with an annual salary of 800 lire imperial. At the death of Antonio Maria Turati (1650), he was appointed master of the chapel of the cathedral with a salary of £1500, which then increased to £1800. The chapel's staff included the chaplain master, his deputy and twenty singers, of which eight were sopranos. This was the main ensemble that would perform the music Grancini composed in the following years. In this position, Grancini assumed the status of Milan's main composer for major political and civic events. In the motet for four choirs Gaudia intonet coelum, the reference to the Pyrénées peace (7 November 1659), which ended the long war between France and Spain, seems clear. The motet Gratulamini, o proceres was dedicated to the crowning of Emperor Leopold I. The motet Arcete merores, fugate languores was composed for the birth of the second-born Prince of Spain.

Biella (1957), in his Eccellente compositore e organista milanese, praised Grancini as Milan's greatest seventeenth century musician.

Grancini's characteristics are "the clarity and nobility of ideas exposed with a first-rate technique and, as a consequence, a persuasive and interesting logic. He is comparable with his contemporary Giacomo Carissimi. Recitative is always fluid and vibrant, just as alive in the choral episodes and the ensembles he masterfully combines when he uses voices and instruments in counterpoint and fugal interplay of great esteem and beauty."

Grancini died in Milan on 17 April 1669.

== Selected works ==
- Partitura dell’armonia ecclesiastica de concerti a 1-4 voci, op.1 (1622–1625)
- Il secondo libro de concerti a 1-4 voci, op 2 (1624–1626)
- Messe, motetti et canzoni a 8 voci, bc (org), op.4 (1627)
- Concerti a 1–4 voci, bc (org), amb la Letanie della madonna, libro III, op 5 (1628)
- Sacri fiori concertati a 1-7 voci con alcuni concerti in sinfonia d'istromenti, op 6 (1631)
- Messa e salmi ariosi con le letanie della Madonna concertati a quattro con la quinta parte a beneplacito, (1632) ampliata con le Antifone della Beata Vergine, op 7 (1637)
- Il quinto libro de concerti ecclesiastici a 1-4 voci, op 8 (1636)
- Novelli fiori ecclesiastici concertati nell'organo all'uso moderno a 4 voci, op 9 (1643)
- Musica ecclesiastica da cappella a 4 voci, … aggiuntovi il basso continuo a beneplacito per l'organo, op. 10 (1645)
- Il primo libro de' madrigali in concerto 2-4 voci, op 11 (1646)
- Il sesto libro de sacri concerti a 2-4 voci, op.12 (1646)
- Corona ecclesiastica divisa in due parti a 2-4 voci, op 13 (1649)
- Il settimo libro de sacri concerti a 2-4 voci, op.14 (1650)
- Varii concerti a 8 voci, op 15 (1652)
- Giardino spirituale de varii fiori musicali a 4 voci, op 16 (1655)
- Sacri concerti espressi in 8 messe a 4 voci et un'altra de' morti a 5 secondo il rito ambrosiano, op 17 (1664)
- Sacri concerti espressi in 4 messe a 5 et 6 voci, op 18 (1666)
- Ottavo libro de' concerti ecclesiastici a 2-4 voci con le letanie della B.M.V. a 4 et 3 voci, op 19 (1666)
- Sacri concerti espressi in 8 Magnificat et 8 Pater a 4 voci, secondo il rito ambrosiano, op 20 (1669)
- 6 mottetti si trovano in raccolte dell'epoca

Around 200 manuscripts are conserved at l'Archivio storico della Fabbrica del duomo di Milano.
