= Musica Fiorita =

German baroque music ensemble

- Origin: Basel, Switzerland
- Genres: Baroque music, Early music
- Years active: 1990–2020

Musica Fiorita was an ensemble for baroque music founded in 1990 and based in Basel, which was conducted by the harpsichordist Daniela Dolci. The ensemble concentrated in particular on rediscovering unknown works by composers of the 17th and 18th centuries and their historical performance practice. In March 2020, it ceased its concert activities.

== The Ensemble ==
For 30 years, the ensemble, under the direction of Daniela Dolci, performed works of the late Renaissance and the Baroque, being committed to historical performance practice and Werktreue, as well as to new ways of musical interpretation. The instrumentation with instruments such as cornet, baroque violin, transverse flute, viola da gamba among others as well as the basso continuo group with lute, theorbo, baroque guitar, salterio, harp, harpsichord and organ aimed at exploring the wealth of finest nuances in 17th century music and 18th century music and to bring it to life. One of the ensemble's focuses was the re-performance of forgotten scores.

In the mixture vocal music and instrumental music and in the contrast between church music and secular works, the ensemble offered a programme with music of the early and high baroque. The performances of selected chamber music were occasionally staged as social events.

While the members of the ensemble came from many parts of the world, they all aspired to the same sound, especially since most of them had studied at the Schola Cantorum Basiliensis, i.e. came from the same school.

The ensemble gave numerous concerts in Western and Eastern Europe, North and South America and Asia and was present at relevant festivals.

== Artistic direction - Daniela Dolci ==
The Sicilian Daniela Dolci studied early music with a major in historical keyboard instruments at the Schola Cantorum Basiliensis in Basel. Subsequently, she worked with Gustav Leonhardt in Amsterdam in order to further her education. The main focus of her interest, inspired by her work with Jesper Bøje Christensen, is the original continuo practice according to 17th and 18th century sources. Her varied activities include concerts, opera performances, television and radio recordings with her and other ensembles René Jacobs - Bach Days Berlin, Hans-Martin Linde - Moscow Chamber Music Festival; with her ensemble MUSICA FIORITA in Tallinn and Riga, St. Petersburg, Oude Muzijk Utrecht; Händel Music Festival in Göttingen, Early Music Days Herne, Innsbruck Early Music Festival; tours in Japan, Poland, Italy, Germany, Argentina, Bolivia, Uruguay; dance projects in collaboration with baroque dance groups; musicological symposia etc.). CDs recordings are available with the ensembles Dulzainas and Concerto di Viole as well as with Ivan Monighetti.

Dolci gives equal weight to the educational aspect. She gives lectures on female composers and performance practice in early music and gives basso continuo and ensemble master classes in (Leipzig, Riga, Moscow, St.Petersburg, Puerto Madryn and Mendoza (Argentina), Santa Cruz (Bolivia), University of Potenza, Matera and Bologna). Meanwhile, she also conducts modern formations that want to deepen their knowledge of early music. In 2006, she was awarded the title of Peace Ambassador through Music by the Honorary Citizens of Chiquito, Bolivia. In 2008, she was awarded the Cavaliere dell'Ordine della Stella della Solidarietà Italiana by the Italian Republic in recognition of her efforts for Italian culture abroad. In 2010, she received the Hans Roth Prize from Bolivia.

== Recordings ==
- Die Herrlichkeit der Erden muss Rauch und Asche werden – Music and poetry from the time of the Thirty Years' War, recitant: Dietrich Fischer-Dieskau
- Celebremus cum gaudio – Work by Johann Melchior Gletle
- Portrait – Work by Élisabeth Jacquet de La Guerre
- Oratorio Alexius of Rome – Camilla de Rossi detta la Romana
- Arie, Lamenti e Cantate – Work by Barbara Strozzi
- Canzoni, Danze e Variazioni – Work by Tarquinio Merula
- Sonate Concertate in Stil Moderno – Work by Dario Castello
- Triumphale canticum – Work by Johann Melchior Gletle
- Céphale et Procris – Tragédie en musique by Elisabeth-Claude Jacquet de la Guerre
- Santa Beatrice d'Este – by Camilla de Rossi detta la Romana
- Antonio Vivaldi, The Four Seasons with Leila Schayegh
