= Lorenz Duftschmid =

Austrian viol player and conductor

Lorenz Duftschmid (born 1964 in Linz, Austria) is an Austrian viol player and conductor.

== Biography ==
Born to a musical family, Duftschmid began studying music in an early age, and enjoyed the opportunity to learn from the great masters of the viol, such as Jordi Savall. He studied at the Schola Cantorum Basiliensis in Basel, Switzerland.

Duftschmid is the director of the ensemble Armonico Tributo Austria, besides his solo career as a gamba player. He is also a member of Jordi Savall's ensembles Hesperion XX and La Capella Reial de Catalunya.

Duftschmid is an expert in the field of Baroque music, and excels in the performance of Renaissance and early Classical repertory as well.

== Instruments ==
Duftschmid owns and plays on the following viols:

- Gasparo da Salo (ca. 1580)
- Jakobus Stainer (Absam-Tirol, 1679)
- Nicolas Bertrand (Paris, 1699)
- Antony Stephan Posch (Vienna, 1717)

== Discography ==
Duftschmid took part in more than 70 recordings. To mention some of the prominent releases:

- Johannes Schenck: Les Fantaisies bisarres de la Goutte (CPO)
- Georg Muffat: Nobilis Juventus (CPO)
- Marin Marais: Pieces de Caractère (CPO)
- Johann Joseph Fux: Concentus Musico-Instrumentalis, Vol. 1 (Arcana)
- Johann Heinrich Schmelzer: La Margarita (Arcana)
- Telemann: Viola di Gamba (Arcana)
