= Wolf Matthias Friedrich =

German opera singer

- Born: Schönheide, Germany
- Education: Musikhochschule Leipzig
- Occupations: Classical baritone; Classical bass
- Website: wolfmatthiasfriedrich.de

Wolf Matthias Friedrich is a classical singer of baritone and bass roles, especially of Early music and Baroque music.

Friedrich studied at the Musikhochschule Leipzig. In 1980, he was the winner of the International Dvorák Competition in Karlovy Vary. From 1982 to 1986 Friedrich was a member of the Opera Studio of the Dresden State Opera. The bass has made guest appearances at the Dresden Music Festival, the Handel Festival in Halle, the Schwetzingen Festival as well as in Berlin, Hanover, Potsdam, Edinburgh and Australia. In 2000, he performed the role of Pluto in the first modern revival of Giovanni Legrenzi's La divisione del mondo at the Schwetzingen Festival. He has focused on Baroque operas. He has often collaborated with the conductor Alessandro De Marchi. In 2002/03, he appeared as Licomede in Handel's Deidamia at the Handel Festival in Halle, conducted by De Marchi. In the 2006/07 season Friedrich performed the role of Publio in Mozart's La clemenza di Tito in a production by Ursel and Karl-Ernst Herrmann, and under the musical direction of De Marchi at the Estates Theatre in Prague. He worked with Norman Shetler in various lied projects, including Franz Schubert, Felix Mendelssohn and Carl Loewe). His recordings have included Schubert’s Schwanengesang. He works regularly with the ensembles Musica Fiata and Cantus Cölln, also as a member of Cantus Cölln. In 2002, Friedrich was one of the co-founders of the Kerll-Rosenmüller Festival, which was held annually from 2002 to 2006 to promote the musical heritage of the Baroque composers Johann Caspar Kerll, Johann Rosenmüller and Sebastian Knüpfer.

== Opera productions ==
- Monteverdi: L'incoronazione di Poppea (Cologne Opera)
- Monteverdi: L'Orfeo (Brisbane, Sydney, Melbourne)
- Monteverdi: Il ritorno d'Ulisse in patria (Cologne)
- Peranda/Bontempi: Dafne (Dresdner Musikfestspiele)
- Legrenzi: La divisione del mondo (Schwetzingen Festival)
- Steffani: Orlando (Hannover Herrenhausen)
- Handel: Deidamia, Semele (Halle)
- Handel: Aci, Galatea e Polifemo (Potsdam)
- Handel: Orlando (Göttingen, Drottningholm, Berlin, New York, Tanglewood)
- Handel: Admeto (Göttingen, Edinburgh)
- Handel: Rinaldo (Cologne, Prague)
- Handel: Alcina (Cologne, Wiesbaden)
- Haydn: Armida (Schwetzingen)
- Mozart: Le nozze di Figaro (Hannover Herrenhausen, Wiesbaden)
- Mozart: Cosi fan tutte (Wiesbaden)
- Mozart: La clemenza di Tito (Prague)
- Mozart: Entführung aus dem Serail (Potsdam, Cologne, Wiesbaden)
- Mozart: Don Giovanni (Cologne)
- Mussorgski: Boris Godunow (Wiesbaden)
- Cimarosa: Il matrimonio segreto (Dresden)
- Weill: Aufstieg und Fall der Stadt Mahagonny (Cologne)
- Rossini: L'italiana in Algeri (Cologne)
- Matthus: Cornet (Dresden)
- Shih: Vatermord (Dresden Hellerau)
- Tschaikowski: Eugene Onegin
- Zimmermann: Weiße Rose (Schwerin).
