= Bartolomé de Selma y Salaverde =

Spanish composer and bassoonist

Fray Bartolomé de Selma y Salaverde (c. 1595, in Cuenca – after 1638) was a Spanish Baroque composer and virtuoso player of the dulcian. He was an Augustinian friar who was employed at the archducal court at Innsbruck from 1628 to 1630, and was the son, or possibly grandson, of Bartolome de Selma (d. 1616), luthier to the Spanish royal chapel. His compositions include manuscript vocal works and the Canzoni, fantasie & correnti (Venice, 1638). Its five part books are titled Primo Libro, Secondo Libro, Terzo Libro, Quarto Libro, and Basso Continuo.

== Works ==
Selected works include:

- Canzoni, fantasie & correnti (1638)
- Canzona a 4 sopra battaglia
