= Camilla de Rossi =

Italian composer (fl. 1670–1710)

Camilla de Rossi (fl. 1670–1710) was an Italian composer known for her oratorios composed in Vienna during the early 1700s. She is recognized for having the most surviving works of any female composer from Northern Italy and Austria during the Baroque period. Her compositions reflect the style of the time, characterized by intricate vocal lines and emotional depth.

Several of De Rossi's oratorios were composed for performance at the Vienna court. Her legacy is notable for the rarity of women composing during the Baroque era, a time when most women composers were marginalized

== Biography ==
Born in the late 17th century, De Rossi likely had Roman citizenship, as she signed the title pages of her manuscripts as Romana, meaning 'a woman of Roman descent'. Rossi composed four oratorios for solo voices and orchestra, all of which were commissioned by Emperor Joseph I of Austria and were performed in the Imperial Chapel in Vienna.

== Work ==
Rossi's oratorios are all for solo voices with orchestral accompaniment; none of her works used choruses.

Rossi's works typically call for various instruments (chalumeaux, archlute, trumpets, oboe), along with string orchestra (including continuo). For example, her oratorio, Il Sacrifizio di Abramo demands two chalumeaux, an instrument first heard in Vienna in 1707, one year before her oratorio was performed for the first time in 1708. Her cantata Frá Dori e Fileno is for strings and two soloists. Barbara Garvey Jackson (University of Arkansas) mentioned Rossi's work as [showing an] "intimate knowledge" of stringed instruments.

=== List of works ===
- Oratorios, for solo voices, orchestra (MSS incl. some libs and orch pts in A-Wm; arias ed. B.G. Jackson in Arias from Oratorios by Women Composers of the Eighteenth Century, Fayetteville, AR, 1987–99):
- Santa Beatrice d'Este (Benedetto Pamphili), 1707
- Il sacrifizio di Abramo (F. Dario), 1708
- Il figliuol prodigo (C. de Rossi),1709
- Sant'Alessio, 1710
- Frà Dori, e Fileno (cant.), S, A, str orch, D-Dl, ed. B.G. Jackson (Fayetteville, 1983)

== Discography ==
- Rossi, Camilla de: Sinfonia [with lute] from "Il Sacrifizio di Abramo, Perf. Terrie Baune, Judith Nelson and the Bay Area Women's Philharmonic. Providence, Rhode Island. Newport Classic, 1990
- Oratorio "Sant'Alessio", perf. Ensemble Musica Fiorita, Daniela Dolci, director (soloists Graham Pushee, countertenor; Rosa Dominguez, soprano; Agnieszka Kowalezyk, soprano; William Lombardi, tenor), Pan Classics 510 136, 2001
- "Il Sacrifizio di Abramo", Weser-Renaissance, Manfred Cordes, conductor (Soloists Susanna Rydén, soprano; Rolf Popken, alto; Jon Strömberg, tenor), Classic Produktion Osnabrück, cpo 999 3712, 1996
- Santa Beatrice d'Este, Musica Fiorita; Daniela Dolci, conductor; (Soloists Graciella Oddone: Santa Beatrice, soprano; Denis Lakey: countertenor), ORF Edition Alte Musik, CD 3092

== Bibliography ==
- Jackson, Barbara Garvey: "Camilla de Rossi," Grove Music Online (1/28/07), http://www.grovemusic.com
- Jackson, Barbara Garvey: "Camilla de Rossi," Composers born 1600–1699, New York, G.K. Hall, 1996, ed. Sylvia Glickman and Martha Furman Schleifer.
- Jackson, Barbara Garvey, Arias from oratorios by women composers of the eighteenth century. Vols. 1, 2, 3, 4, 5, 7. Fayetteville, Arkansas, ClarNan Editions, 1987–1999. Volume 1 also includes Caterina Benedetta Grazianini and Maria Margherita Grimani.
