= Giovanni Paolo Cima =

Italian composer

Giovanni Paolo Cima (c. 1570 – 1630) was an Italian composer and organist in the early Baroque era. He was a contemporary of Claudio Monteverdi and Girolamo Frescobaldi, though not as well known (then or now) as either of those men.

Cima came from a family of musicians and was a leading musical figure in Milan. From 1595 he served as director of music and organist at the chapel of Santa Maria presso San Celso in Milan. His Concerti ecclesiastici, a collection which also includes a mass, two Magnificat settings, and six sonatas for 2, 3, and 4 instruments, were published in 1610.

Cima's church music was generally conservative, but his instrumental works were more innovative. His importance lies primarily in being the second composer to publish a trio sonata (for violin, cornett, and basso continuo), in his 1610 collection (the first was Salamone Rossi, in 1607). It is a single-movement, through-composed work displaying thematic integration and virtuosic display.

Cima died in Milan during the plague of 1630, at about the age of 60. His son Giovanni Battista Cima is not to be confused with the painter Giovanni Battista Cima, called Cima da Conegliano, who was no relation.

== Main works ==
- 1599: Il primo libro delli motetti, for four voices
- 1602: Ricercare per organo
- 1606: Partito di ricercari & canzoni alla francese
- 1610: Concerti ecclesiastici (Ecclesiastical concerti), for 8 voices, together with a mass, two Magnificats, and six sonatas with 2 to 4 instruments and basso continuo
