= Rudolf Lutz =

Swiss organist, harpsichordist, conductor and composer

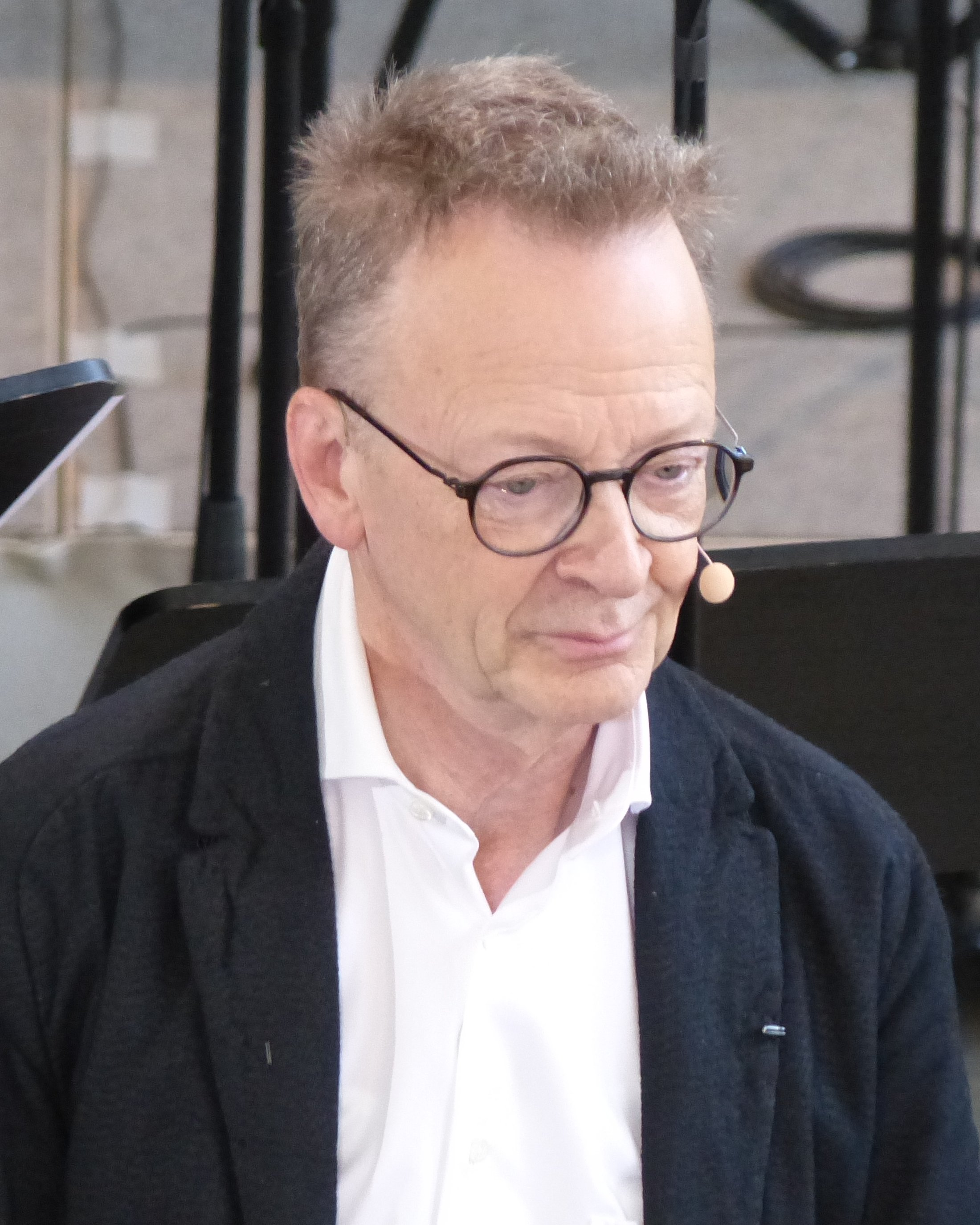
- Lutz in 2024
- Born: 1951 (age 73–74); Lausanne, Switzerland
- Occupations: Conductor; Organist; Harpsichordist; Composer; Academic teacher
- Organizations: Schola Cantorum Basiliensis · J. S. Bach-Stiftung
- Website: rudolflutz.ch

Rudolf Lutz (born 1951) is a Swiss organist, harpsichordist, conductor and composer.

== Education ==
Lutz studied at the Zurich University of the Arts, in Zürich and at the University of Music and Performing Arts, Vienna.

== Career ==
From 1973 he was organist of the St. Laurenzen Kirche, a Protestant church in St. Gallen: he gave up the post in 2013. He has taught improvisation at the Schola Cantorum Basiliensis.

=== J. S. Bach-Stiftung ===
In 2006 Lutz was appointed artistic director of the J. S. Bach-Stiftung, which is based in St. Gallen. The Foundation is engaged in a project to perform and record Bach's complete vocal works at a church in Trogen, a project which began in 2006 and was originally scheduled to take 25 years. The Foundation maintains a choir and an orchestra (founded by Lutz as the "ensemble Schola Seconda Pratica") and features international soloists in the Bach performances.

== Publications ==
- Wege zur Annäherung an den Bedeutungsgehalt einer Kantate von J. S. Bach – Improvisatorisch-kompositorische Ansätze. In: Improvisatorische Praxis vom Mittelalter bis zum 18. Jahrhundert. Basler Jahrbuch für historische Aufführungspraxis, Band 38. Amadeus, Winterthur 2007, ISBN 3-905786-07-9. Seite 185–215.
