= J. S. Bach-Stiftung =

Music foundation in Switzerland

J.S. Bach-Stiftung, known in English as the J.S. Bach Foundation, is a Swiss foundation established in St. Gallen in 1999 to support the performance of the vocal works of Johann Sebastian Bach.

== Founders ==
The J.S. Bach-Stiftung was established, using private funds, by the musician Rudolf Lutz (artistic director) and the private banker Konrad Hummler.

== World Wide Web ==
In addition to CD and DVD recordings, the J.S. Bach-Stiftung operates a channel on YouTube, where selected recordings (e.g., excerpts and including individual movements from cantatas). And, since August 2015 the foundation provides its own streaming media platform, from which the complete discography is obtainable.
