= New Year's Day =

First day of the year in the Gregorian calendar

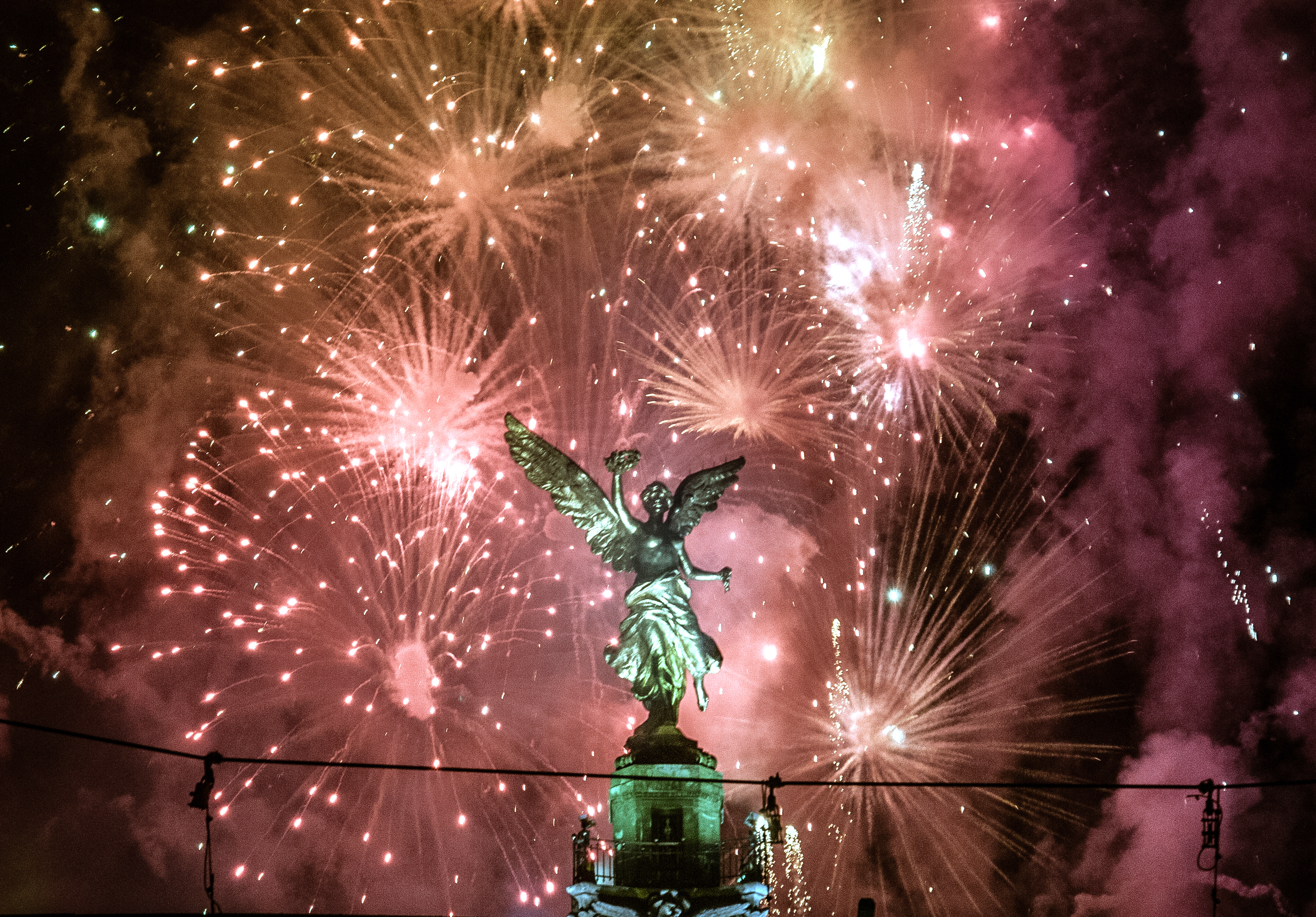
- Fireworks in Mexico City for the Celebration of the New Year in 2013
- Observed by: Users of the Gregorian calendar
- Type: International
- Significance: The first day of the year in the Gregorian calendar
- Celebrations: Making New Year's resolutions, church services, parades, parties, sporting events, fireworks, drone light shows
- Date: 1 January
- Next time: 1 January 2027
- Frequency: Annual
- Related to: New Year's Eve; Hogmanay; Nowruz; Indian New Year; Chinese New Year; Islamic New Year; Christmas and holiday season; Epiphany

In the Gregorian calendar, New Year's Day is the first day of the calendar year, 1 January. Most solar calendars, such as the Gregorian and Julian calendars, begin the year regularly at or near the northern winter solstice. In contrast, cultures and religions that observe a lunisolar or lunar calendar celebrate their Lunar New Year at varying points relative to the solar year.

In pre-Christian Rome, under the Julian calendar, the day was dedicated to Janus, god of gateways and beginnings, for whom January is also named. From Roman times until the mid-18th century, the new year was celebrated at various stages and in various parts of Christian Europe on 25 December, on 1 March, on 25 March and on the movable feast of Easter.

In the present day, with most countries now using the Gregorian calendar as their civil calendar, 1 January according to that calendar is among the most celebrated of public holidays in the world, often observed with fireworks at the stroke of midnight following New Year's Eve, as the new year starts in each time zone. Other global New Year's Day traditions include making New Year's resolutions and calling one's friends and family.

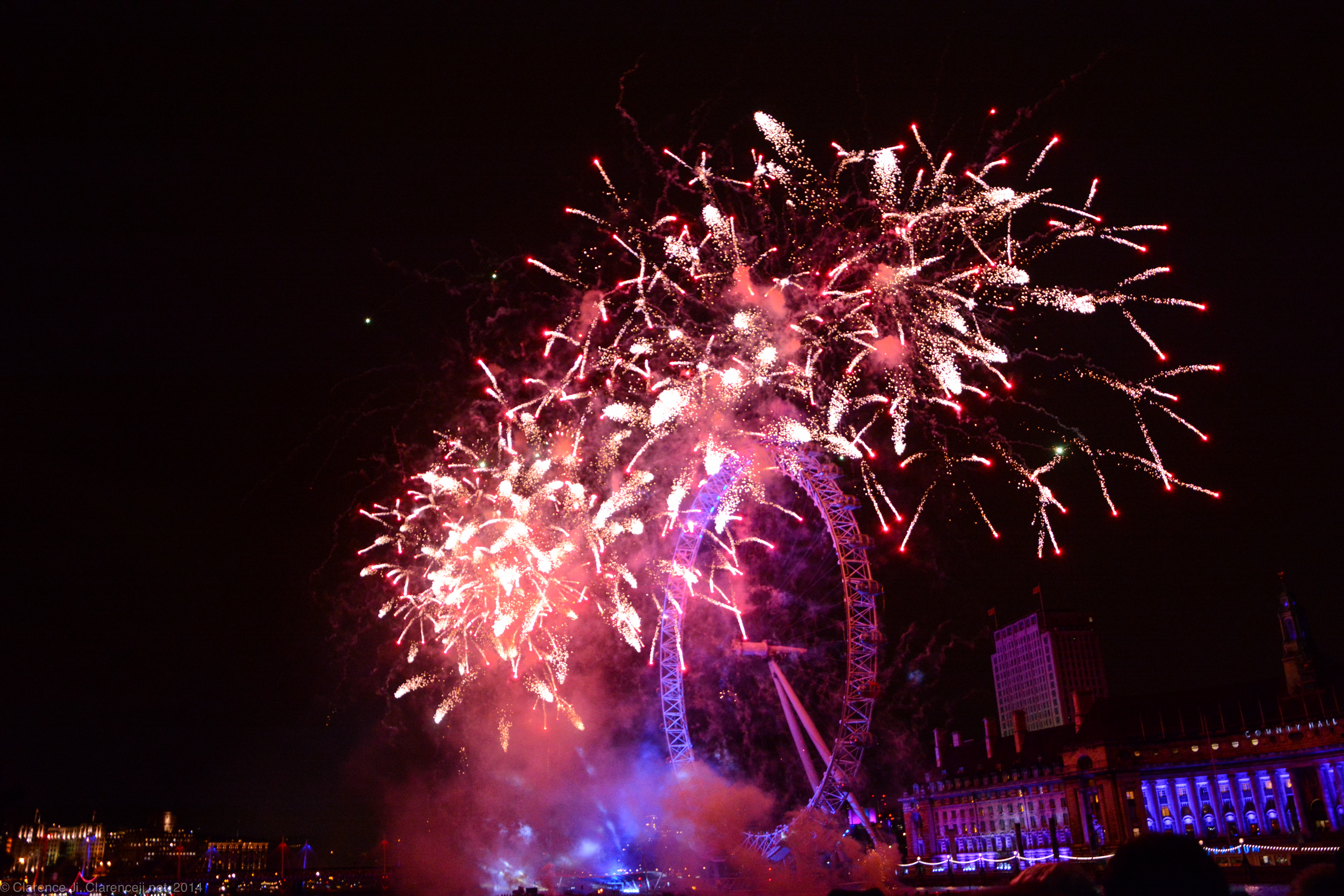
Fireworks in London at the stroke of midnight on New Year's Day 2014

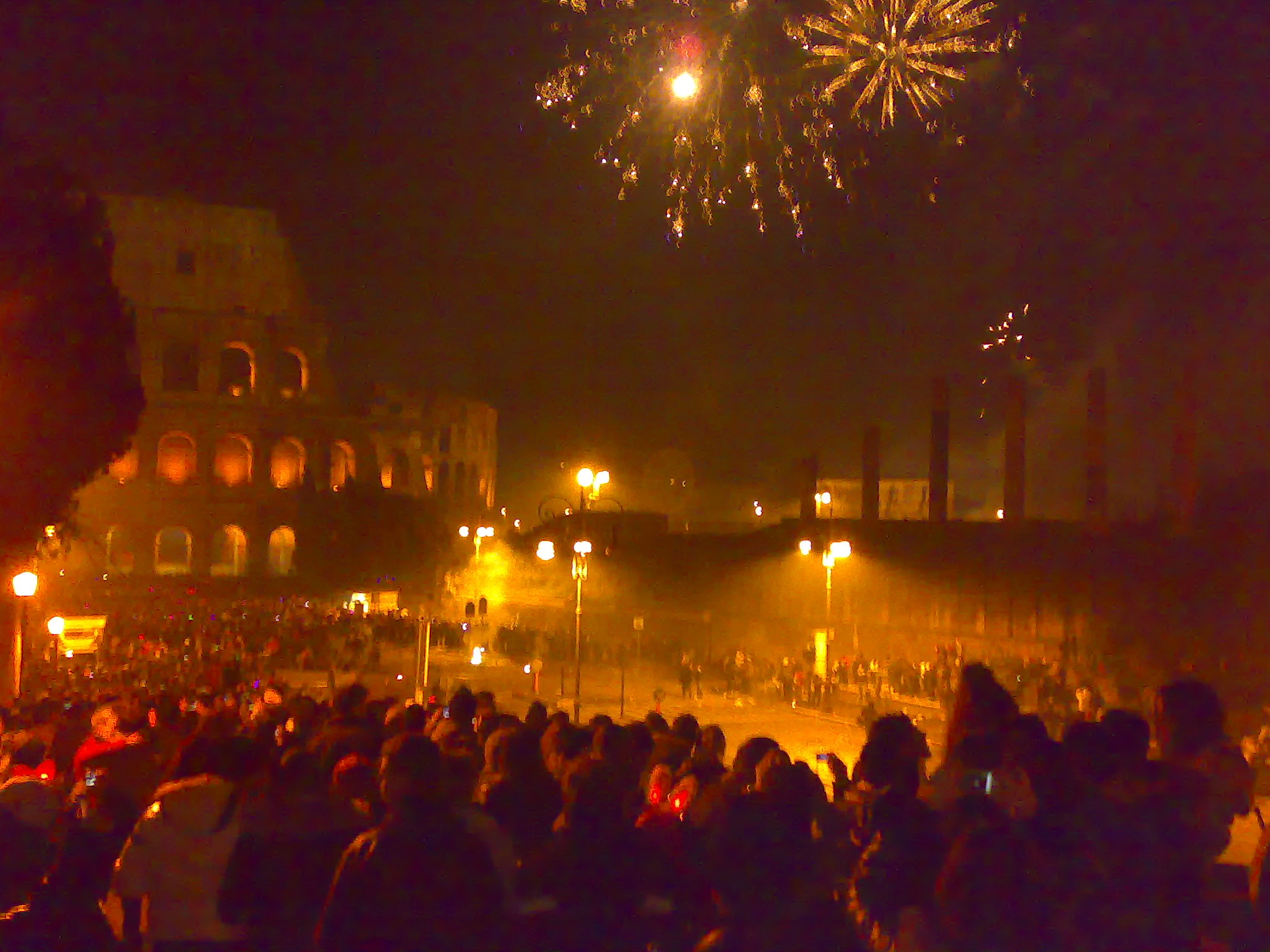
Fireworks in Rome at the stroke of midnight on New Year's Day 2012

== History ==
The ancient Babylonian calendar was lunisolar, and around the year 2000 BC began observing a spring festival and the new year during the month of Nisan, around the time of the March equinox. The early Roman calendar designated 1 March as the first day of the year. The calendar had just 10 months, beginning with March. That the new year once began with the month of March is still reflected in some of the names of the months. September through to December, the ninth through to the twelfth months of the Gregorian calendar, were originally positioned as the seventh through to the tenth months. (Septem is Latin for "seven"; octo, "eight"; novem, "nine"; and decem, "ten") Roman mythology usually credits their second king Numa with the establishment of the two new months of Ianuarius and Februarius. These were first placed at the end of the year, but at some point came to be considered the first two months instead.

The January kalend (Latin: Kalendae Ianuariae), the start of the month of January, came to be celebrated as the new year at some point after it became the day for the inaugurating new consuls in 153 BC as a result of the rebellion in Hispania which began the second Celtiberian War. Romans had long dated their years by these consulships, rather than sequentially, and making the kalends of January start the new year aligned this dating. Still, private and religious celebrations around the March new year continued for some time and there is no consensus on the question of the timing for 1 January's new status. Once it became the new year, however, it became a time for family gatherings and celebrations. A series of disasters, notably including the failed rebellion of M. Aemilius Lepidus in 78 BC, established a superstition against allowing Rome's market days to fall on the kalends of January and the pontiffs employed intercalation to avoid its occurrence.

=== New Year's Day in the older Julian calendar ===
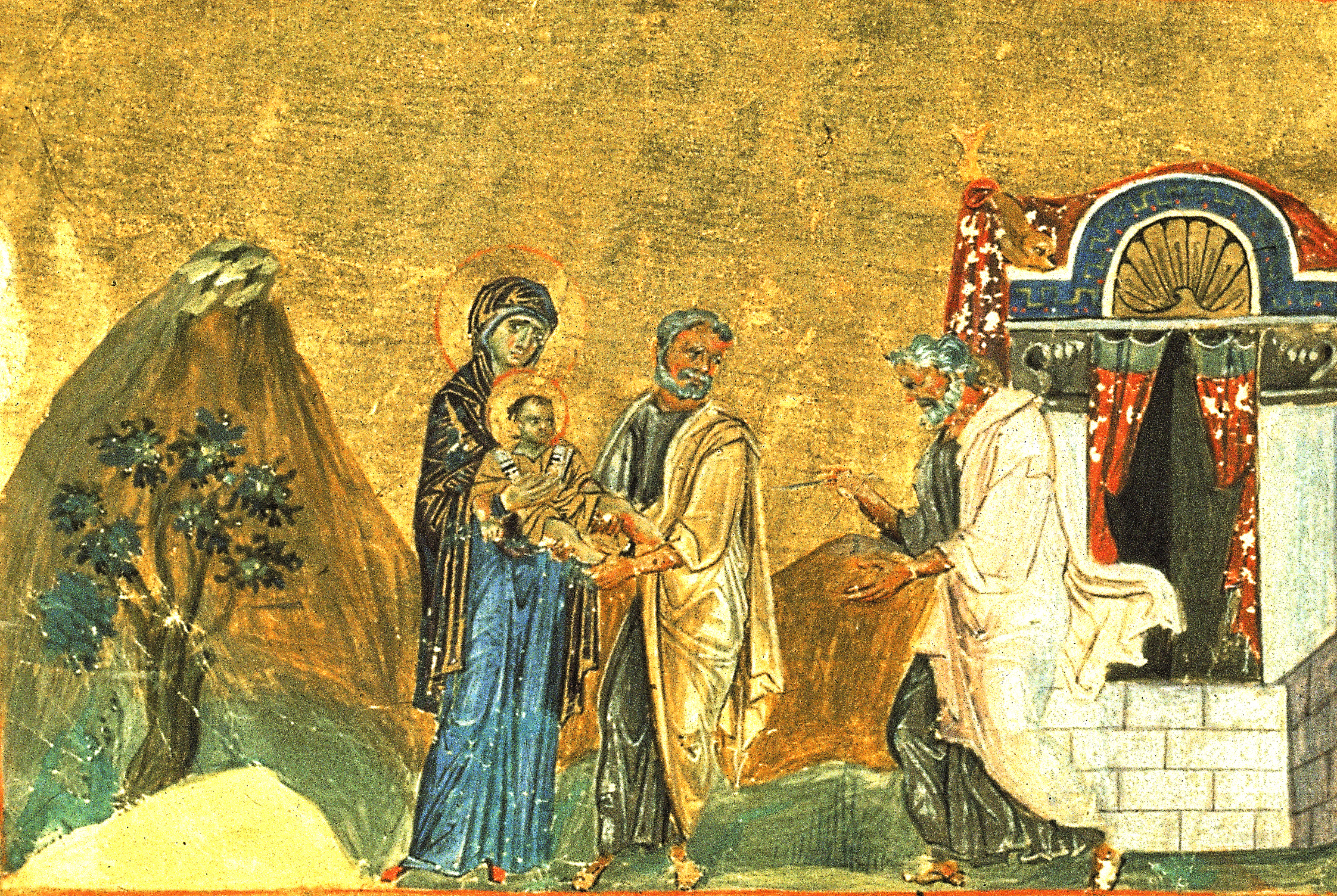
In Christendom, 1 January traditionally marks the Feast of the Circumcision of Christ

The Julian calendar, proposed by Julius Caesar in 46 BC, was a reform of the Roman calendar. It took effect on 1 January 45 BC, by edict. The calendar became the predominant calendar in the Roman Empire and subsequently, most of the Western world for more than 1,600 years. The Roman calendar began the year on 1 January, and this remained the start of the year after the Julian reform. However, even after local calendars were aligned to the Julian calendar, they started the new year on different dates. The Alexandrian calendar in Egypt started on 29 August (30 August after an Alexandrian leap year). Several local provincial calendars were aligned to start on the birthday of the Emperor Augustus, 23 September. The indiction caused the Byzantine year, which used the Julian calendar, to begin on 1 September; this date is still used in the Eastern Orthodox Church for the beginning of the liturgical year.

At various times and in various places throughout mediaeval Christian Europe, the new year was celebrated on 25 December in honour of the birth of Jesus; 1 March in the old Roman style; 25 March in honour of Lady Day (the Feast of the Annunciation, the date of the conception of Jesus); and on the movable feast of Easter.

==== Christian observance ====
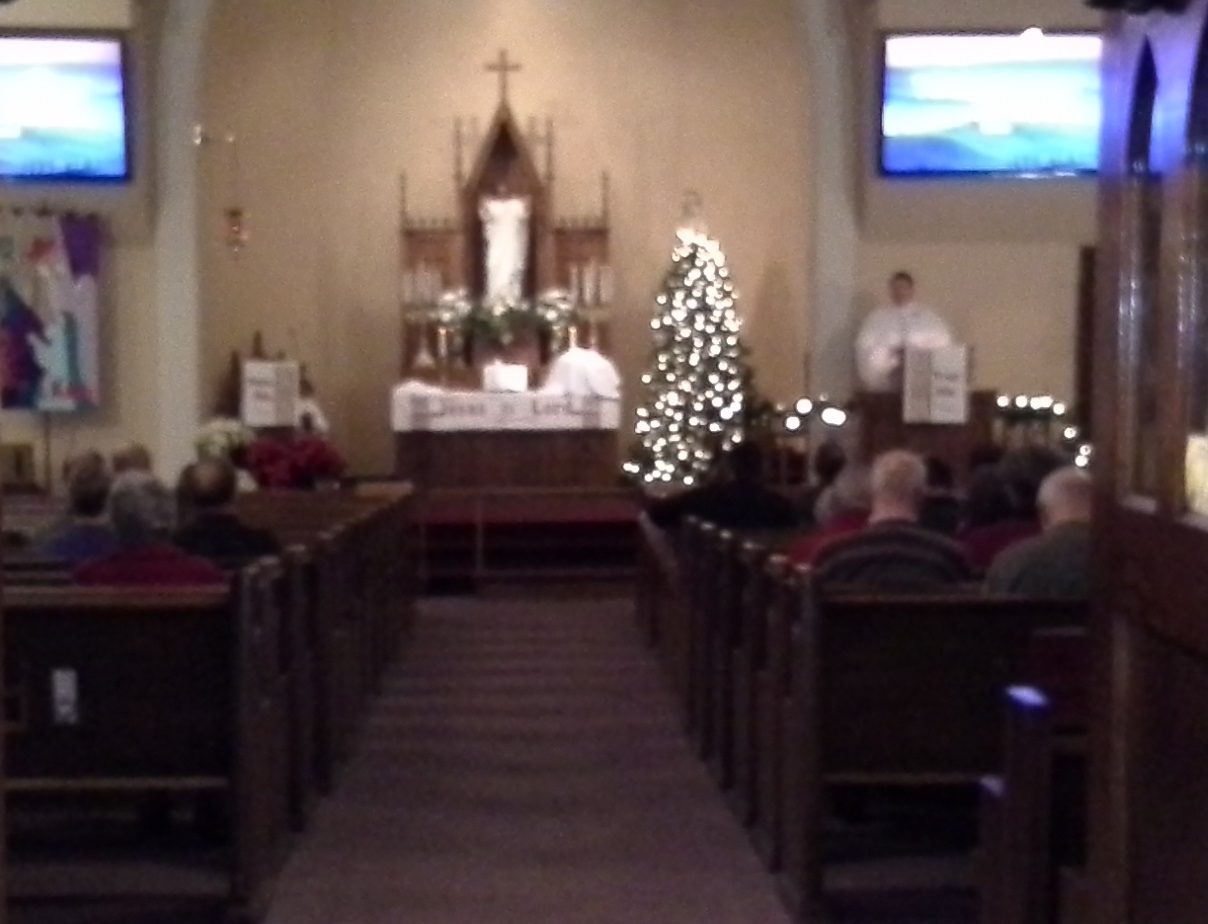
A Watchnight Mass at a Lutheran Christian church on New Year's Eve (2014)

Christians of various denominations (Catholics, Lutherans, Anglicans, and Moravians, among others) often attend a watchnight service (also known as a Watchnight Mass if Holy Communion is celebrated) on the night of New Year's Eve and this liturgy concludes in the morning of New Year's Day. Watchnight services provide the opportunity for Christians to review the year that has passed and make confession, and then prepare for the year ahead by praying and resolving. The services often include singing, praying, exhorting, preaching, and Holy Communion.

As a date in the Christian calendar, New Year's Day liturgically marked the Feast of the Naming and Circumcision of Jesus, which is still observed as such in the Lutheran Church, Anglican Church, the Ambrosian section of the Catholicism, the Eastern Orthodox Church (Julian calendar, see below) and in Traditional Catholicism by those who retain the usage of the General Roman Calendar of 1960. The mainstream Roman Catholic Church celebrates on this day the Solemnity of Mary, Mother of God. In Western Christianity, the Feast of the Naming and Circumcision of Jesus Christ marks the eighth day (octave day) of Christmastide.

In an article in Polityka, a Polish weekly periodical, Aleksander Krawczuk, a professor of history and former Minister of Culture of Poland, wrote that ancient Christians in ancient Rome considered the custom of celebrating the new year to be "scandalous and thoroughly pagan, alien in form and spirit to the worshipers of enlightened religion".

==== Gift giving ====
Among the 7th-century pagans of Flanders and the Netherlands, it was the custom to exchange gifts at the winter solstice. This custom was deplored by Saint Eligius (died 659 or 660), who warned the Flemish and Dutch: "(Do not) make visuals, [little figures of the Old Woman], little deer or iotticos or set tables [for the house-elf, compare Puck] at night or exchange New Year gifts or supply superfluous drinks [another Yule custom]."

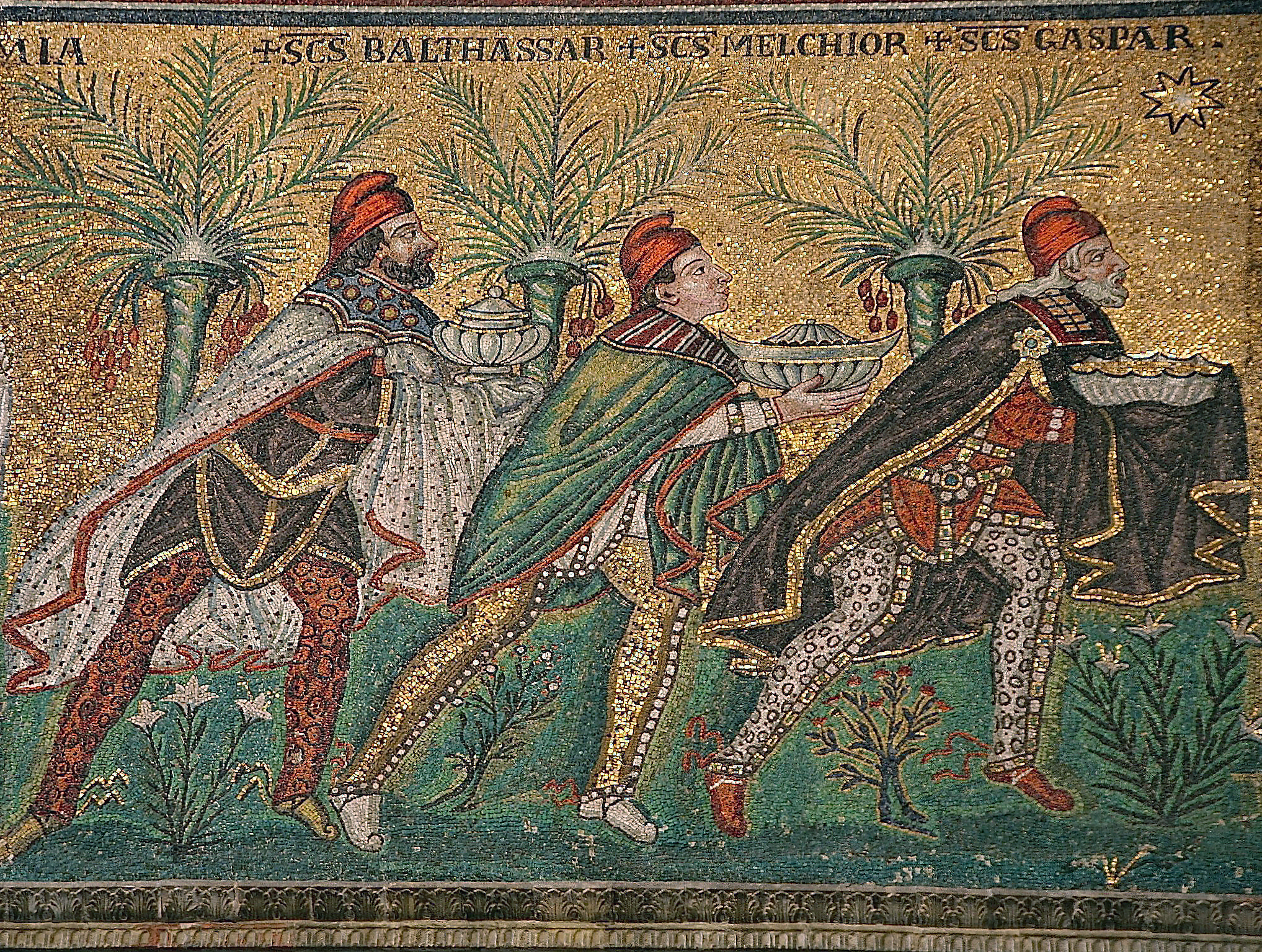
The Three Magi, Byzantine mosaic, c. 565, Basilica of Sant'Apollinare Nuovo, Ravenna, Italy (restored during the 19th century). As here, Byzantine art usually depicts the Magi in Persian clothing, which includes breeches, capes, and Phrygian caps.

On the date that Christians celebrated the Feast of the Circumcision of Christ (1 January), they exchanged Christmas presents because the feast fell within the 12 days of the Christmas season in the Western Christian liturgical calendar; the custom of exchanging Christmas gifts in a Christian context is traced back to the Biblical Magi who gave gifts to the Christ Child. In Tudor England, 1 January (as the Feast of the Circumcision, not New Year's Day), along with Christmas Day and Twelfth Night, was celebrated as one of three main festivities among the twelve days of Christmastide, and gift-giving was customary at the royal court.

=== Acceptance of 1 January as New Year's Day ===
Most nations of Europe and their colonies officially adopted 1 January as New Year's Day somewhat before they adopted the Gregorian calendar. Most of Germany changed to 1 January from 1544, the Netherlands did so from 1556 or 1573 according to sect, Spain and Portugal from 1556, France from 1564, Italy (pre-unification) on a variety of dates, Sweden, Norway and Denmark from 1599, Scotland from 1600, and Russia from 1700 or 1725. England, Wales, Ireland, and Britain's American colonies adopted 1 January as New Year's Day from 1752.

==== Great Britain and the British Empire ====
Until Tuesday, 31 December 1751 (Note: New style: 11 January 1752) (except Scotland), (Note: Scotland had already adopted 1 January, since 1600) the Kingdom of Great Britain and the British Empire at the time had retained 25 March as the official start of the year, although informal use of 1 January had become common. (Note: For example, see Pepys, Samuel. "Tuesday 31 December 1661". "I sat down to end my journey for this year, ..." (The Diary of Samuel Pepys)) With the Calendar (New Style) Act 1750, Britain and the Empire formally adopted 1 January as New Year's Day in 1752 and, with the same Act, also discarded the Julian calendar at the end of Wednesday, 2 September of that same year (though the actions are otherwise unrelated). The Act came into effect "following the last said day of December 1751". (Note: This syntax was needed because, according to the standard of the time the Bill was being written, the next day would still have been 1751.)

By 1750, adjustments needed to be made for an eleven-day difference between the older Julian calendar and the newer (and more accurate) Gregorian calendar. There was some religious dissent regarding feast days being moved, especially Christmas Day (see Old Christmas), and isolated communities continued the old reckoning to a greater or lesser extent. The years 1800 and 1900 were leap years in the Julian calendar but not in the Gregorian, so the difference increased to twelve days, then thirteen. The year 2000 was a leap year in both calendars.

- In the Gwaun Valley in Wales, the new year is celebrated on 13 January, still based on the 19th century difference in the calendars.
- Foula, in the Shetland islands celebrates Yule ('Old Christmas' rather than the December solstice) on 6 January and Newerday on 13 January. Again, both dates reflect the 19th century reckoning and were not moved again in 1900.

=== Eastern Orthodoxy ===
At various stages during the first half of the twentieth century, all countries in Eastern Christendom adopted the Gregorian calendar as their civil calendar but continued – and some continue even into modern times – to use the Julian Calendar for ecclesiastical purposes. As 1 January (Julian) equates to 14 January (Gregorian), a religious celebration of the New Year on this date may seem strange to Western eyes.

== New Year's Day in other calendars ==
In cultures and religions that traditionally or currently use calendars other than the Gregorian, New Year's Day is often also an important celebration. Some countries concurrently use Gregorian and another calendar. New Year's Day in the alternative calendar attracts alternative celebrations of that new year:

=== African ===
- Nayrouz and Enkutatash are the New Year's Days of the Coptic calendar and the Ethiopian calendar, respectively. Both occur on 29 August (Julian) or about 11 September (Gregorian). They preserve the legacy of the ancient Egyptian new year Wept Renpet, which originally marked the onset of the Nile flood but which wandered through the seasons until the introduction of leap years to the Egyptian calendar by Augustus in 30–20 BC. In Ethiopia, the new year is held to mark the end of the summer rainy season.
- The Odunde Festival, also called the African New Year, is celebrated in Philadelphia, Pennsylvania in the United States on the second Sunday of June. While the name was based on the Yoruba African culture, its celebration marks the largest African celebration in the world, which more or less was started by a local tradition.
- The Sotho people of Lesotho and South Africa celebrate Selemo sa Basotho on 1 August during the end of the Southern Hemisphere's winter. This is based on the Sotho calendar, and includes observances such as "Mokete wa lewa", a celebration that follows the harvest.

=== East Asian ===
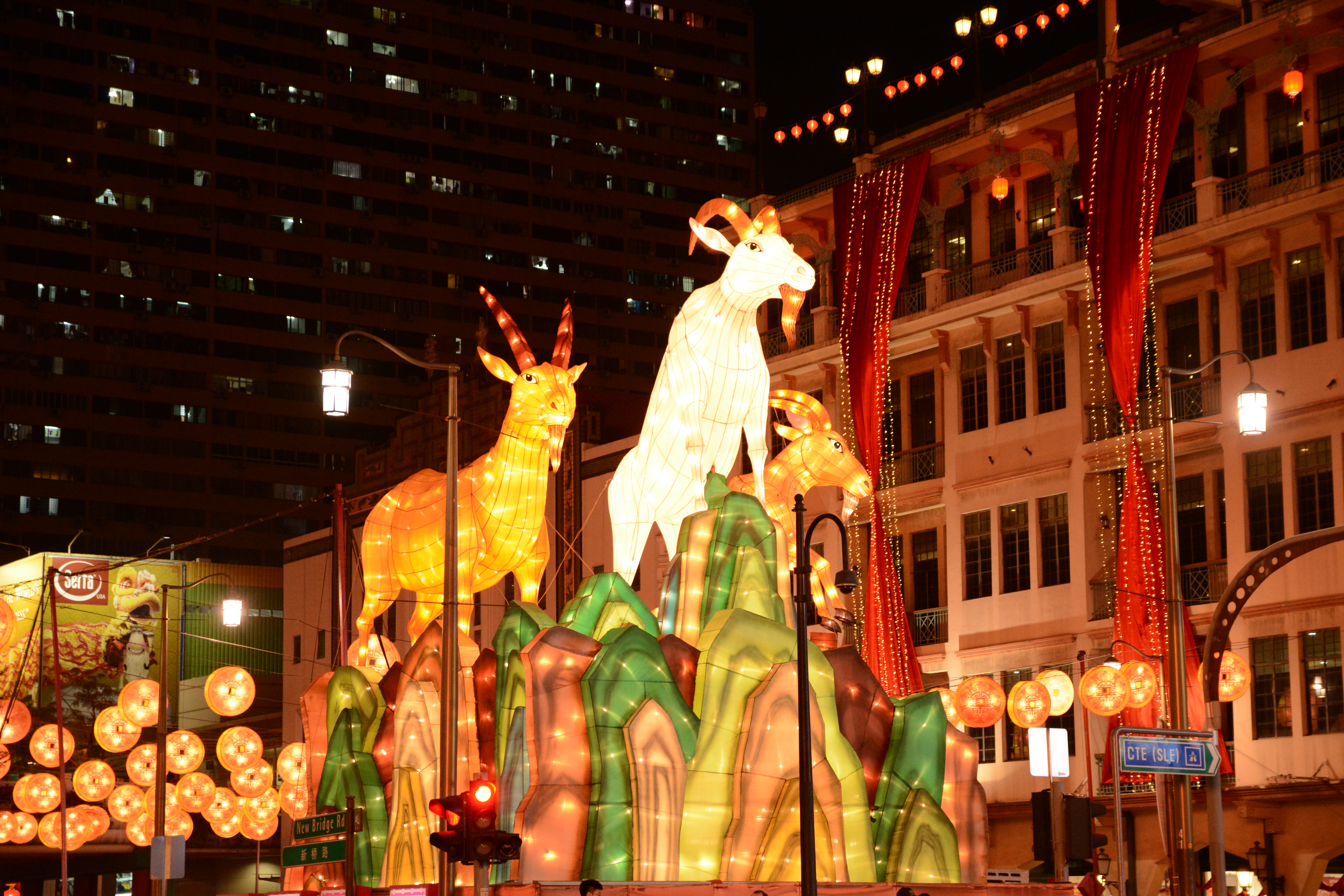
Chinese New Year decorations along New Bridge Road in Singapore

- Chinese New Year is celebrated in some countries in East Asia, including China, and some in Southeast Asia, including Singapore. It is the first day of the traditional Chinese calendar, a lunar calendar that is corrected for the solar changes every three years (i.e. a lunisolar calendar). The holiday normally falls between 20 January and 20 February. The holiday is celebrated with food, family, lucky money (usually in a red envelope), and many other red items that are believed to bring good luck. Lion and dragon dances, drums, fireworks, firecrackers, and other types of entertainment fill the streets on this day. In China, 1 January is also a legal holiday, and people celebrate the Gregorian New Year, but it is not as grand as the traditional Chinese New Year.

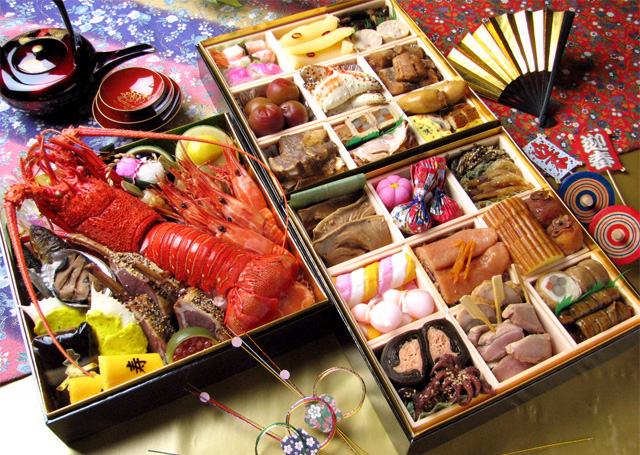
Osechi-ryōri, typical Japanese New Year's dishes

- Japanese New Year is celebrated on 1 January in accordance with the Gregorian calendar instead of with the Chinese calendar (which was in use until 1873).

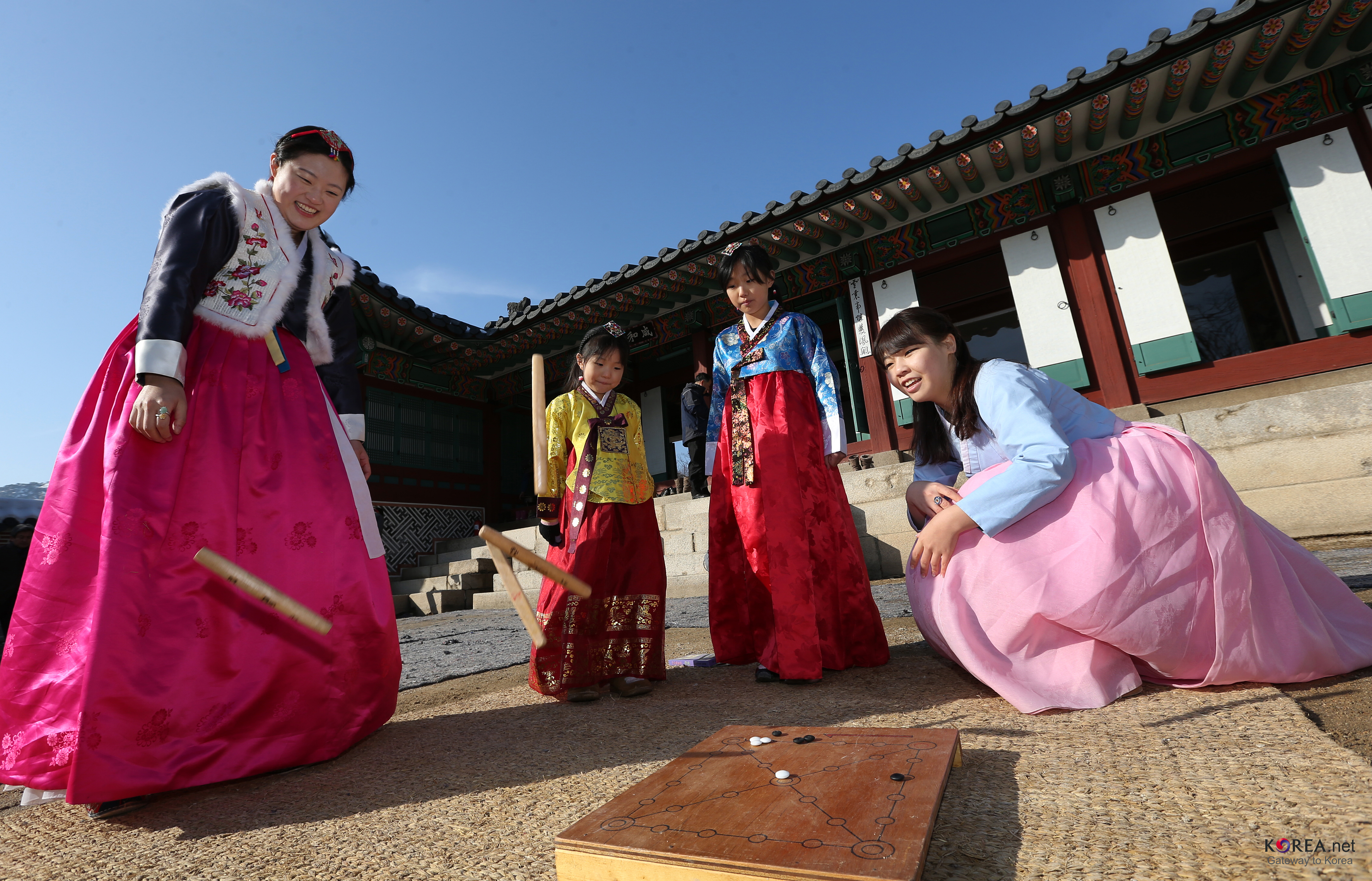
Koreans wearing hanbok and playing yut during the Korean New Year.

- Korean New Year is celebrated on the first day of the traditional Korean calendar in South Korea. The first day of this lunisolar calendar, called Seollal (설날), is an important national holiday (along with Chuseok), with a minimum of three days off work and school. Koreans celebrate New Year's Day by preparing food for their ancestors' spirits, visiting ancestors' graves, and playing Korean games such as yunnori with families and friends. Young children show respect to their parents, grandparents, relatives, and other elders by bowing down in a traditional way and are given good wishes and money by elders.
  - In addition, South Koreans celebrate the 1 January New Year's Day of the Gregorian Calendar, and as a national holiday, people have the day off. The Gregorian calendar is now the official civil calendar in South Korea, so the populace now considers the 1 January New Year's Day to be the first day of the year. South Koreans calculate their age using the East Asian age reckoning method, with all South Koreans adding a year to their age at midnight of the New Year (of the Gregorian, not the Korean calendar). Families enjoy the New Year by counting down to midnight on New Year's Eve on 31 December.
- North Koreans celebrate the New Year's Day holiday on the first day of the Gregorian calendar, 1 January. This New Year's Day, also called Seollal, is a large holiday in North Korea, while they take a day off on the first day of the Korean calendar. The first day of the Korean calendar is regarded as a day for relaxation, but North Koreans consider the first day of the Gregorian calendar to be more important.

=== Southeast Asian ===
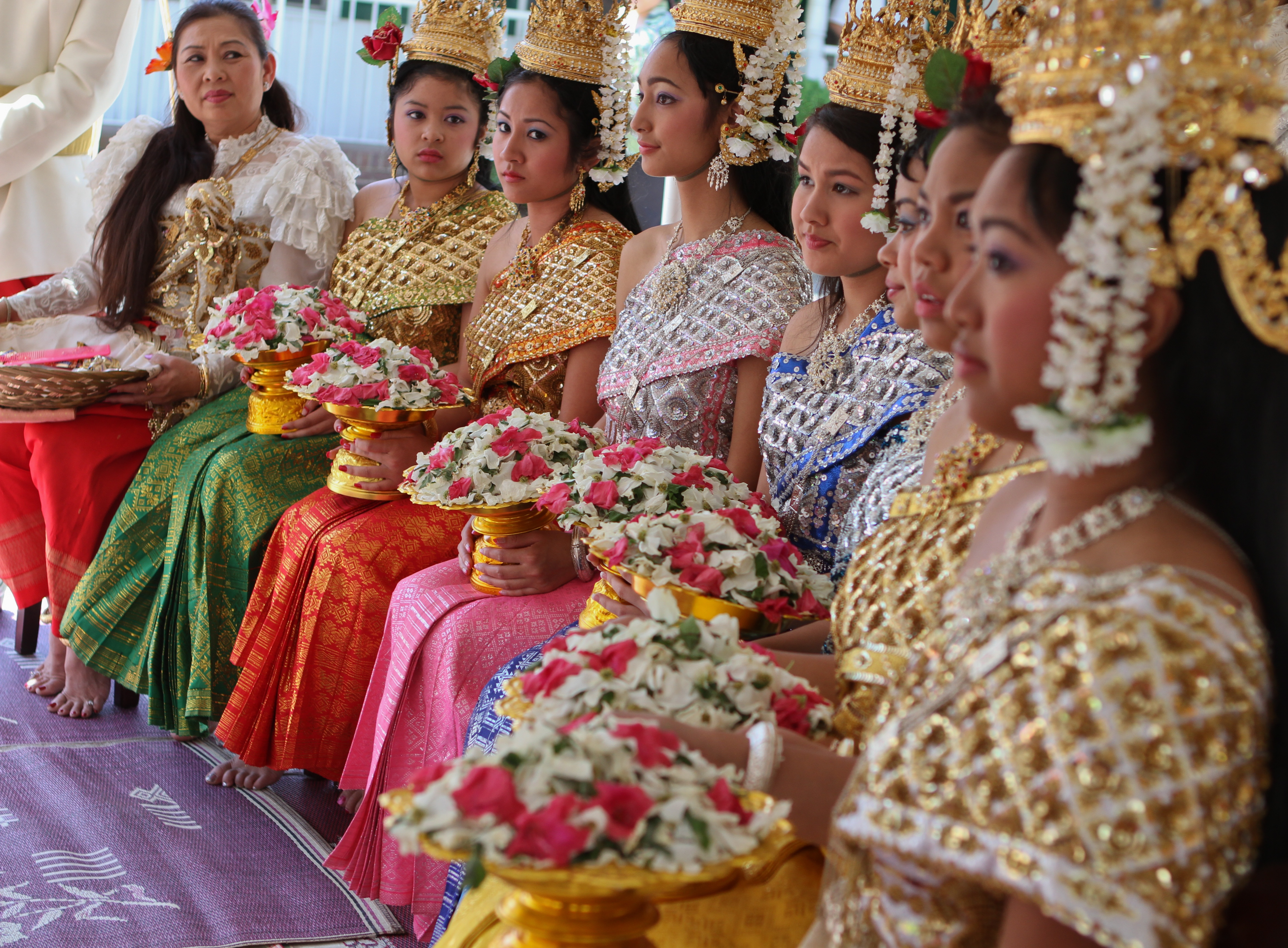
Khmer women at a Cambodian New Year celebration in Lithonia, Georgia, U.S., 2010.

- Cambodian New Year (Chaul Chnam Thmey) is celebrated on 13 April or 14 April. There are three days for the Khmer New Year: the first day is called "Moha Songkran", the second is called "Virak Wanabat" and the final day is called "Virak Loeurng Sak". During these periods, Cambodians often go to the pagoda or play traditional games. Phnom Penh is usually quiet during Khmer New Year as most Cambodians prefer spending it at their respective hometowns.
- Thai New Year is celebrated on 13 April or 14 April and is called Songkran in the local language. People usually come out to splash water on one another. The throwing of water originated as a blessing. By capturing the water after it had been poured over the Buddhas for cleansing, this "blessed" water is gently poured on the shoulder of elders and family for good fortune.
- Thingyan, Burmese new year's celebrations, typically begin on 13 April but the actual New Year's Day falls on 17 April in the 21st century. The day has slowly drifted over the centuries. In the 20th century, the day fell on 15 or 16 April while in the 17th century, it fell on 9 or 10 April.

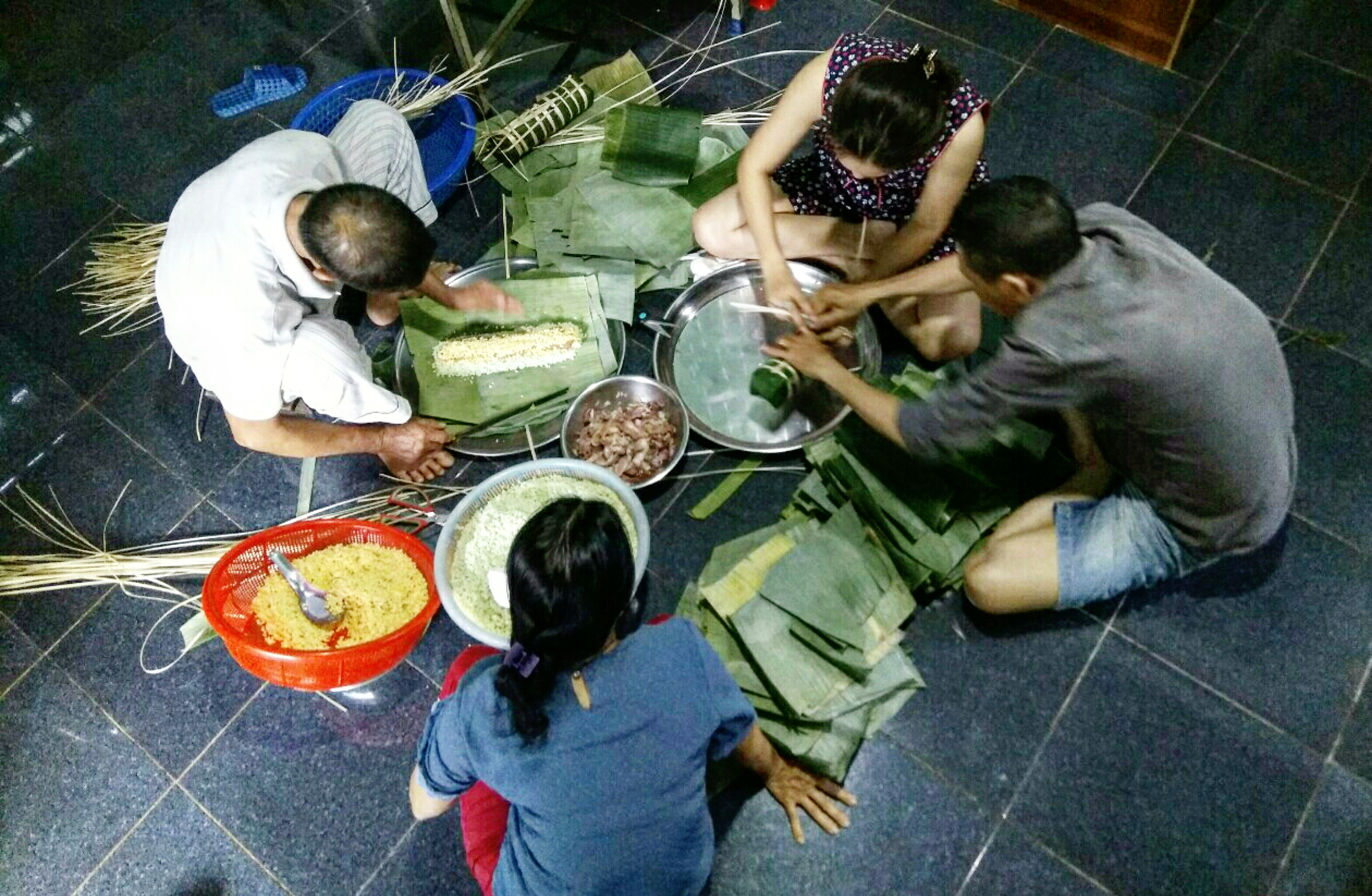
A family gathering to make bánh tét for the Vietnamese New Year celebrations

- Vietnamese New Year (Tết Nguyên Đán or Tết), more commonly known by its shortened name Tết or "Vietnamese Lunar New Year", is the most important and popular holiday and festival in Vietnam, the holiday normally falls between 20 January and 20 February. It is the Vietnamese New Year marking the arrival of spring based on the Chinese calendar, a lunisolar calendar. The name Tết Nguyên Đán is Sino-Vietnamese for Feast of the First Morning, derived from the Hán nôm characters 節 元 旦.

=== South Asian ===
- Diwali related New Year's celebrations include Marwari new year and Gujarati new year.
- Indian New Year's days have several variations depending on the region and are based on the Hindu calendar.
- In Hinduism, different regional cultures celebrate the new year at different times of the year. In Assam, Bengal, Kerala, Nepal, Odisha, Punjab, Telangana, Andhra Pradesh, and Tamil Nadu households celebrate the new year when the Sun enters Aries on the Hindu calendar. This is normally on 14 April or 15 April, depending on the leap year. Elsewhere in northern/central India, the Vikram Samvat calendar is followed. According to that, the new year day is the first day of the Chaitra Month, also known as Chaitra Shukla Pratipada or Gudi Padwa. This is the first month of the Hindu calendar, the first Shukla paksha (fortnight) and the first day. This normally comes around 23–24 March, mostly around the Spring Equinox in Gregorian Calendar. The new year is celebrated by paying respect to elders in the family and seeking their blessings. Celebrants also exchange tokens of good wishes for a healthy and prosperous year ahead.
- Malayalam New Year (Puthuvarsham) is celebrated either on the first day of the month of Medam in mid-April which is known as Vishu, or the first day of the month of Chingam, in the Malayalam Calendar in mid-August according to another reckoning. Unlike most other calendar systems in India, the New Year's Day on the Malayalam Calendar is not based on any astronomical event. It is just the first day of the first of the 12 months on the Malayalam Calendar. The Malayalam Calendar (called Kollavarsham) originated in 825 AD, based on general agreement among scholars, with the re-opening of the city of Kollam (on Malabar Coast), which had been destroyed by a natural disaster.
- Nepal Sambat is the Nepalese New Year celebration specially by the Newar community. Nepali ethnic groups like Gurung, Sherpa and Tamang celebrate Lhosar. While officially Baisakh ek gatey is celebrated. However, there is increased demand from Nepalese of all ethnicity to replace Vikram Sambat with Nepal Sambat as Nepal Sambat is indigenous to Nepal while Vikram Sambat came from India.
- Pahela Baishakh or Bangla Nabobarsho is the first day of the Bengali Calendar. It is celebrated on 14 April as a national holiday in Bangladesh, and on 14 or 15 April in the Indian states of West Bengal, Tripura, and part of Assam by people of Bengali heritage, irrespective of their religious faith.
- The Sikh New Year is celebrated as per the Nanakshahi calendar. The epoch of this calendar is the birth of the first Sikh Guru, Guru Nanak in 1469. New Year's Day falls annually on what is 14 March in the Gregorian Western calendar.

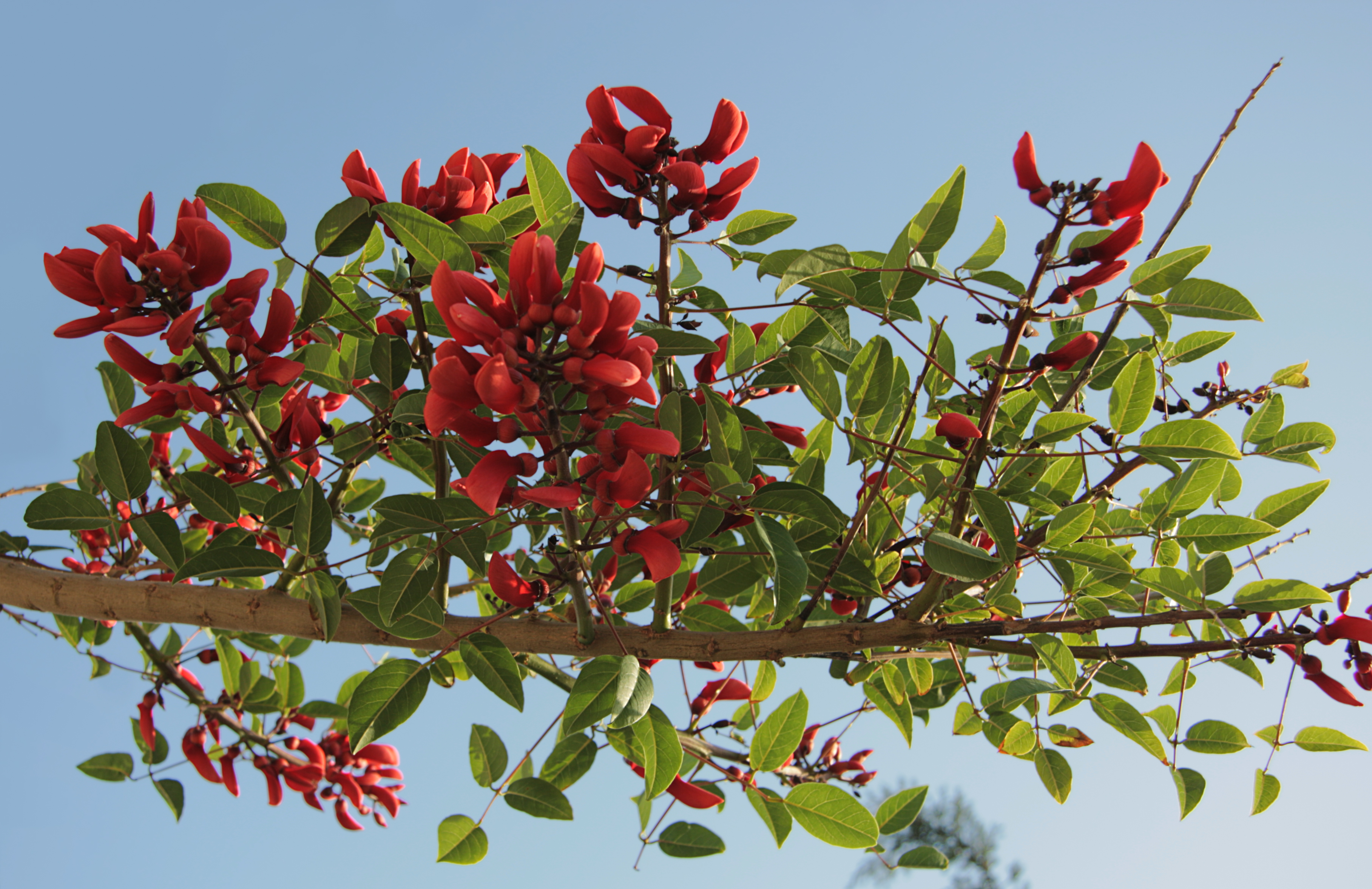
The blossoming flowers of the Yak Erabadu is associated with the advent of the Sinhalese New Year

- Sinhalese New Year is celebrated in Sri Lankan culture predominantly by the Sri Lankan Sinhalese, while the Tamil New Year on the same day is celebrated by Sri Lankan Tamils. The Sinhalese New Year (aluth avurudda), marks the end of the harvest season, by the month of Bak (April) between 13 and 14 April. There is an astrologically generated time gap between the passing year and the New Year, which is based on the passing of the sun from the Meena Rashiya (House of Pisces) to the Mesha Rashiya (House of Aries) in the celestial sphere. The astrological time difference between the New Year and the passing year (nonagathe) is celebrated with several Buddhist rituals and customs that are to be concentrated on, which are exclusive of all types of 'work'. After Buddhist rituals and traditions are attended to, Sinhala and Tamil New Year-based social gatherings and festive parties with the aid of firecrackers, and fireworks would be organized. The exchange of gifts, cleanliness, the lighting of the oil lamp, making kiribath (milk rice), and even the Asian Koel are significant aspects of the Sinhalese New Year.
- Tamil New Year (Puthandu) is celebrated on 13 April or 14 April. Traditionally, it is celebrated as Chiththirai Thirunaal in parts of Tamil Nadu to mark the event of the Sun entering Aries. Panchangam (almanac), is read in temples to mark the start of the Year.
- Telugu New Year (Ugadi), Kannada New Year (Yugadi) is celebrated in March (generally), April (occasionally). Traditionally, it is celebrated as Chaitram Chaitra Shuddha Padyami in parts of Andhra Pradesh, Telangana, and Karnataka to mark the event of New Year's Day for the people of the Deccan region of India. It falls on a different day every year because the Hindu calendar is a lunisolar calendar. The Saka calendar begins with the month of Chaitra (March–April) and Ugadi/Yugadi marks the first day of the new year. Chaitra is the first month in Panchanga which is the Indian calendar. Panchangam (almanac), is read in temples to mark the start of the Year.

=== West Asian ===
The major religions of the West Asia are Islam and Judaism: their adherents worldwide celebrate the first day of their respective new religious calendar years.

==== Islam ====
The two primary sects of Islam are Sunni Islam and Shia Islam. They have different calendars though for both the epoch of the calendar is the Hijrah.

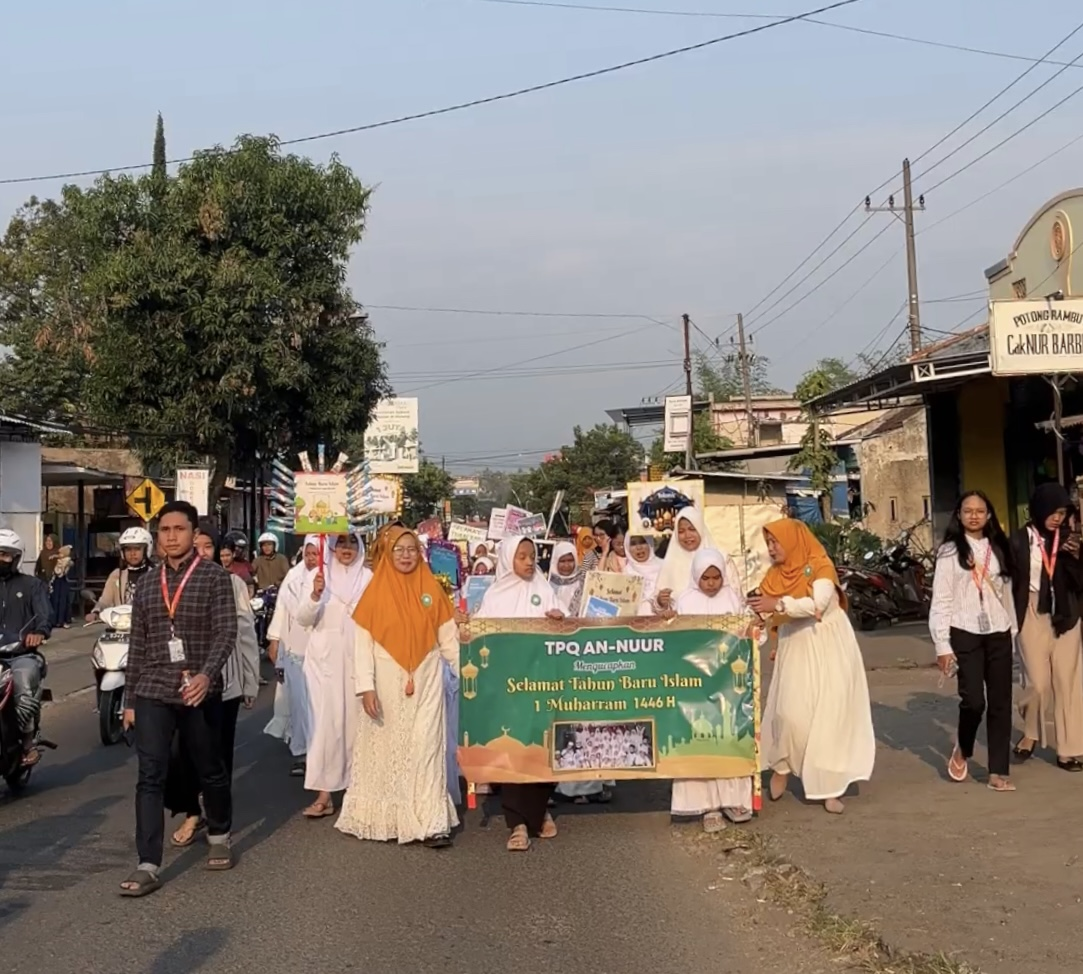
The parade celebrating the 1446th Hijriah Islamic New Year was carried out by several TPQ (a Quran education school in Indonesia) in Nampes Hamlet

- Islamic New Year (or "Hijri New Year", Arabic: رأس السنة الهجرية Ras as-Sanah al-Hijriyah)) is the day in Sunni Islamic culture that marks the beginning of a new year in the Lunar Hijri calendar. It disregards the solar year: its New Year's Day is on a different Gregorian date each year because it is a lunar calendar of twelve lunar months, making it on average 11 to 12 days shorter than a solar year. The first day of the year is observed on the first day of Muharram, the first month in this calendar.
- Nowruz marks the first day of spring and the beginning of the year in the Solar Hijri calendar (one of the Iranian calendars). It is celebrated on the day of the astronomical Northern spring equinox, which usually occurs on or about 20 March (Gregorian calendar). Nowruz has been celebrated for over 3,000 years by the cultural continent of Iran, including Kurdistan and Afghanistan. The holiday is also celebrated and observed by many parts of Central Asia, South Asia, Northwestern China, Crimea and some groups in the Balkans. As well as being a Zoroastrian holiday and having significance amongst the Zoroastrian ancestors of modern Iranians, the same time is celebrated in the Indian subcontinent as the new year. The moment the Sun crosses the celestial equator and equalizes night and day is calculated exactly every year and Iranian families gather together to observe the rituals.

==== Judaism ====
- Rosh Hashanah (the Jewish New Year), is celebrated by Jews in Israel and throughout the world. The date is the new moon of Tishrei, which is the seventh month counting from Nisan, the first month of Spring. It always falls during September or October. The holiday is celebrated by blasting of shofar trumpets, to signify it as a day of judgment, by prayers of penitence, by readings from the law and prophets, and by special meals. The night of 31 December/1 January, the New Year according to the Gregorian calendar, is also celebrated widely in Israel and is referred to as Sylvester or the civil new year.

=== Martian ===
According to a convention established by NASA, the Martian year begins on its Northward equinox, the spring equinox of its northern hemisphere. Its most recent New Year's Day (of MY 37) coincided with 26 December 2022 on Earth's Gregorian calendar. New Year's Day of MY 38 coincided with 12 November 2024.

== Traditional and modern celebrations and customs ==
=== New Year's Eve ===
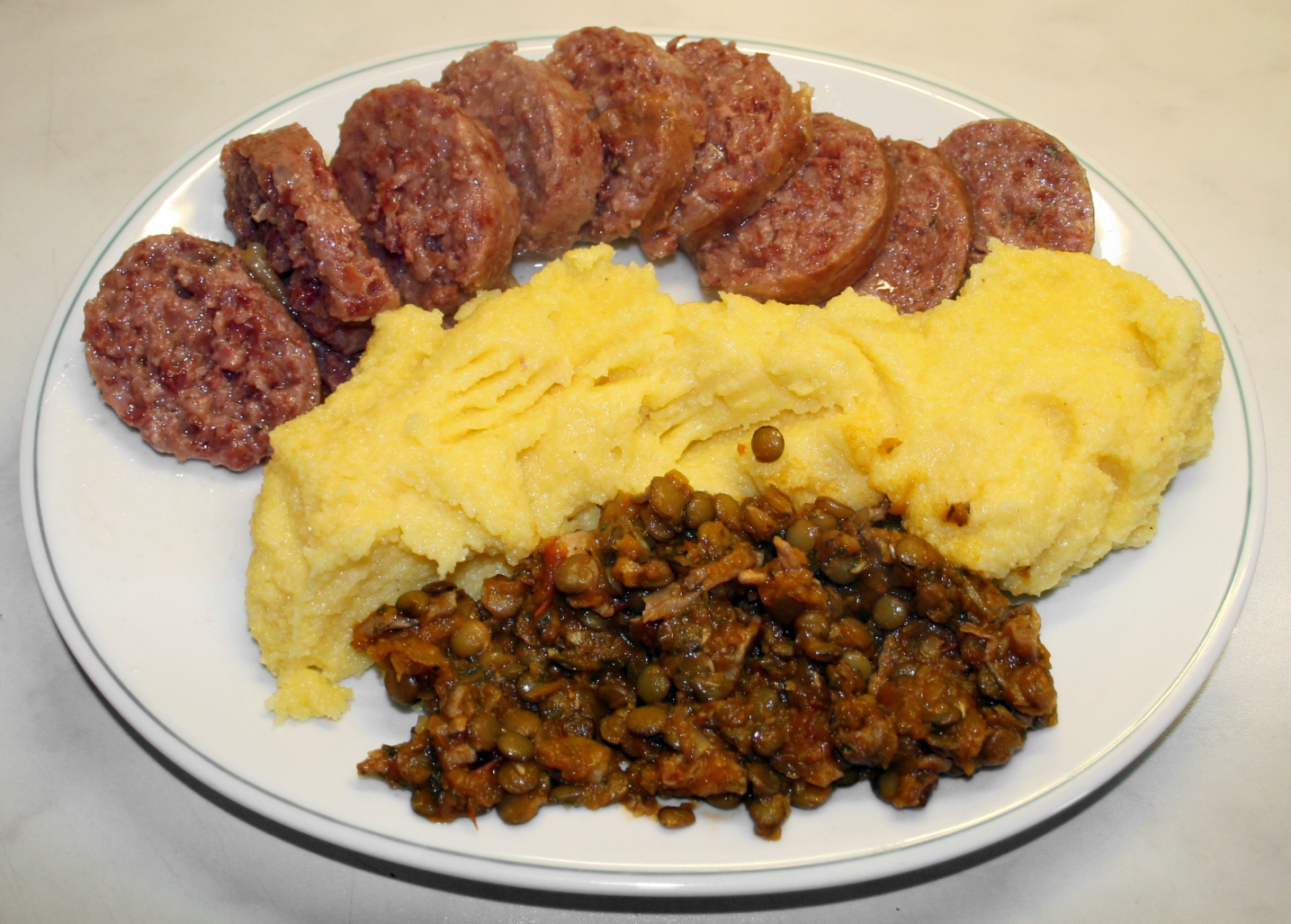
Cotechino, polenta and lentils, traditionally eaten in Italy on New Year's Eve dinner

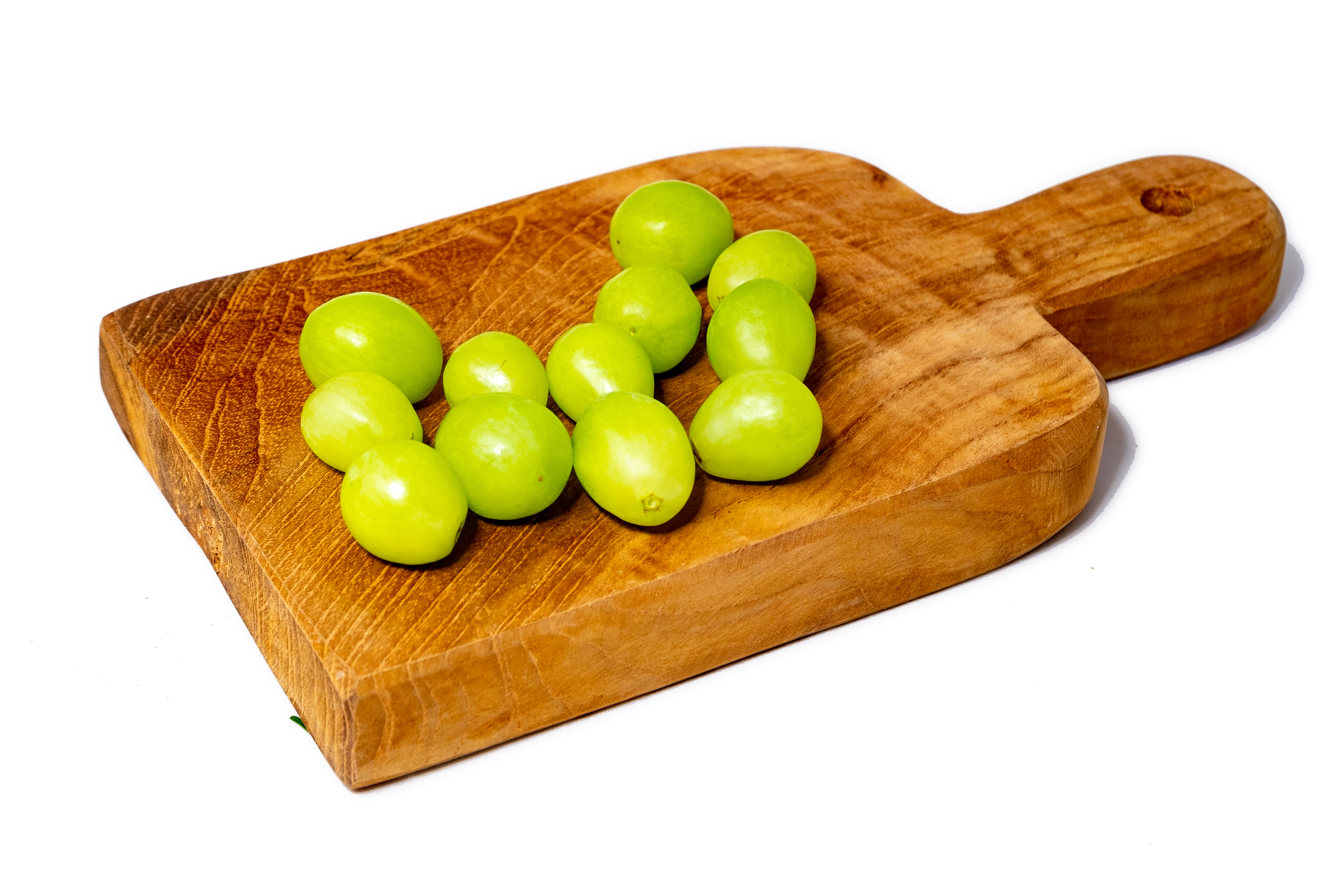
A Spanish tradition consists of eating Twelve Grapes at midnight on New Year's Day, one at each of the twelve strikes of the clock bell ringing at the Puerta del Sol in Madrid.

In the Gregorian calendar, New Year's Eve, also known as Old Year's Day, refers to the evening or the entire day of the last day of the year, 31 December. In many countries, New Year's Eve is celebrated with dancing, eating, drinking, and watching or lighting fireworks. Some Christians attend a watchnight service to mark the occasion. The celebrations generally go on past midnight into New Year's Day, 1 January.

The first places to welcome the New Year are the Line Islands (part of Kiribati), Samoa and Tonga, in the Pacific Ocean. In contrast, American Samoa, Baker Island and Howland Island (part of the United States Minor Outlying Islands) are among the last.

The first of January represents the fresh start of a new year after a period of remembrance of the passing year, including on radio, television, and in newspapers, which starts in early December in countries around the world. Publications have year-end articles that review the changes during the previous year. In some cases, publications may set their entire year's work alight in the hope that the smoke emitted from the flame brings new life to the company. There are also articles on planned or expected changes in the coming year.

This day is traditionally a religious feast, but since the first decade of the 20th century has also become an occasion to celebrate the night of 31 December—New Year's Eve—with parties, public celebrations (often involving fireworks shows) and other traditions focused on the impending arrival of midnight and the new year. Watchnight services are also still observed by many.

=== New Year's Day ===
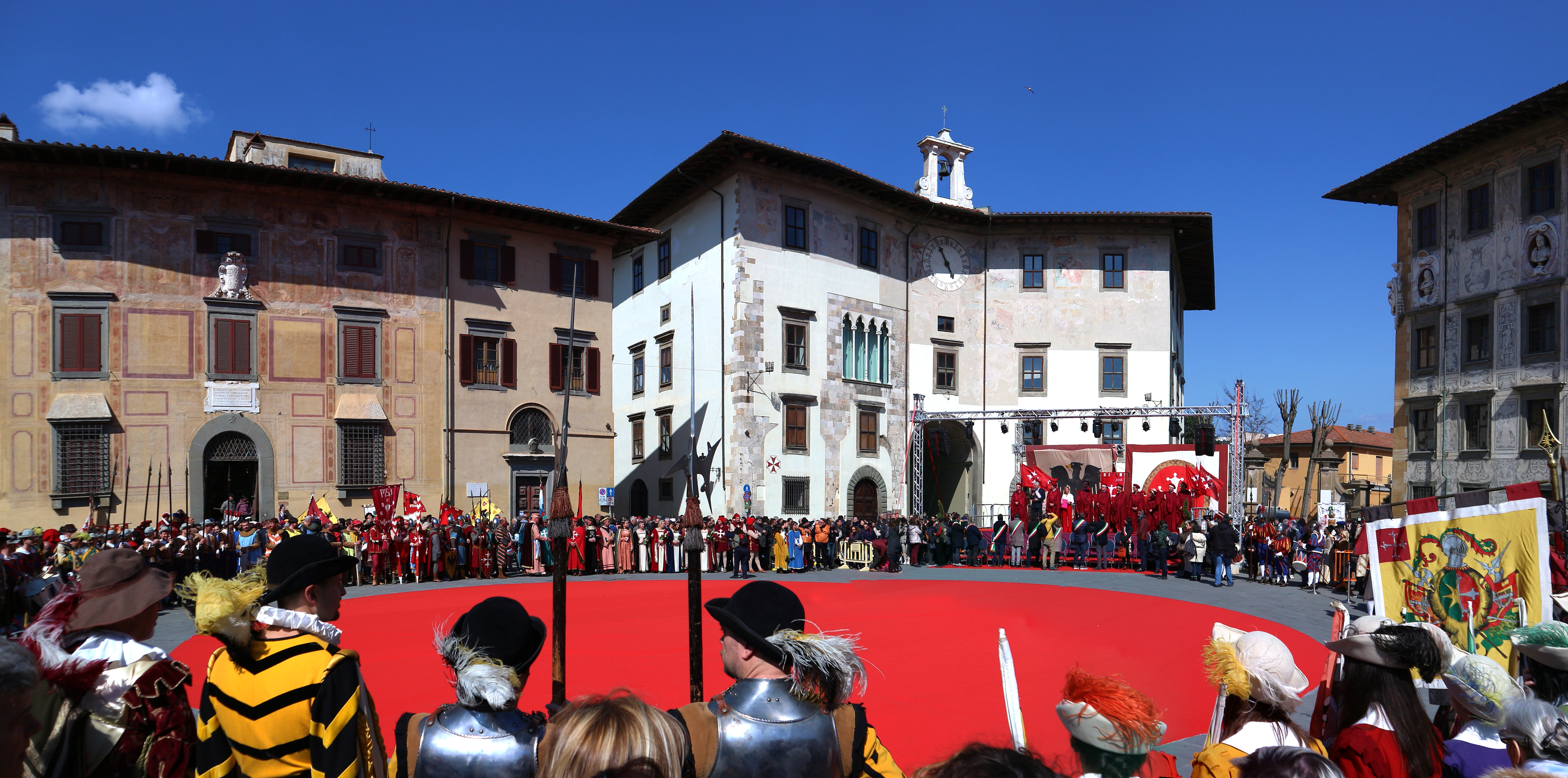
Pisan New Year's Day celebrations, Italy

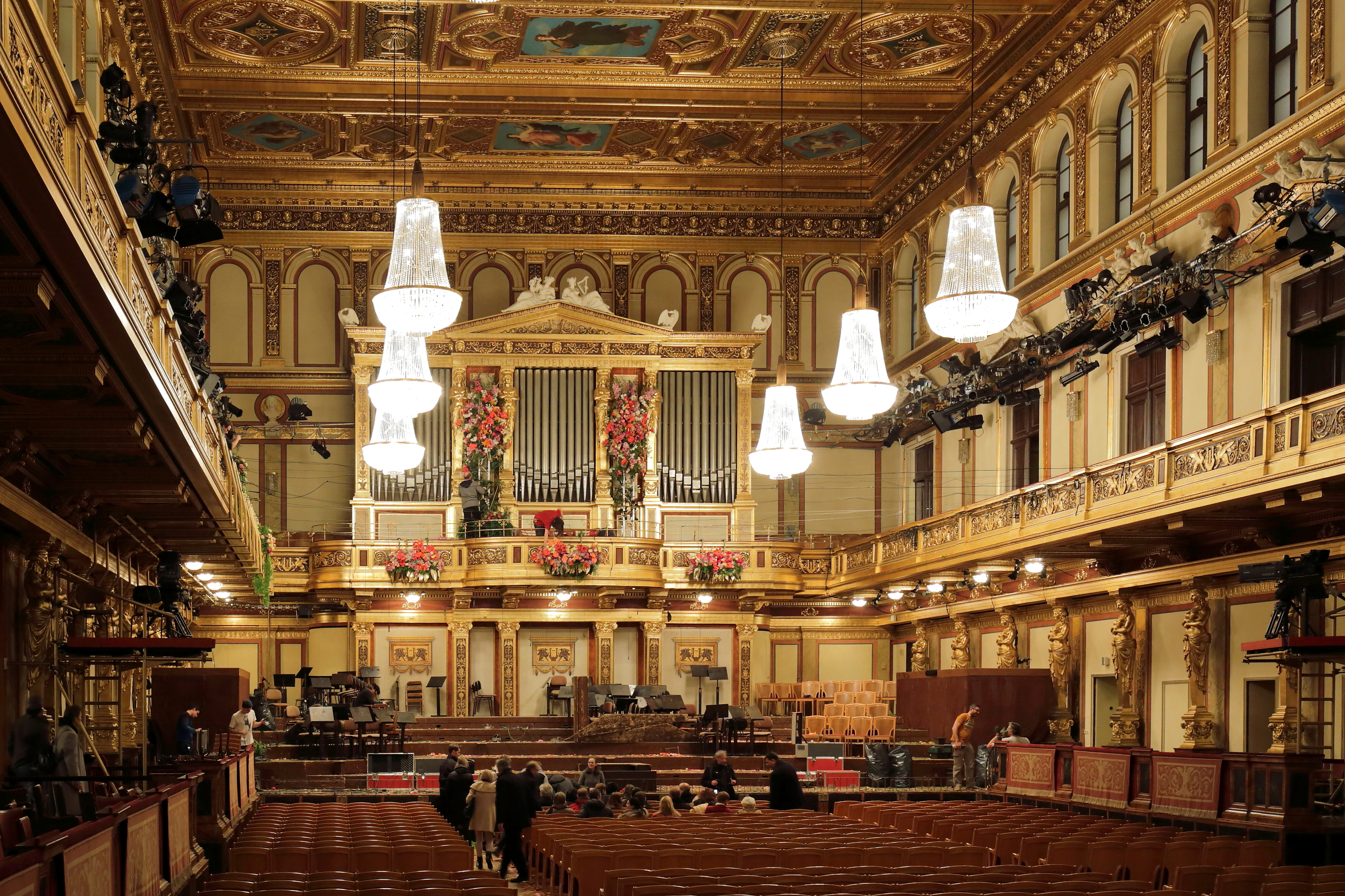
The Golden Hall of the Wiener Musikverein, traditional site of the Vienna New Year's Concert.

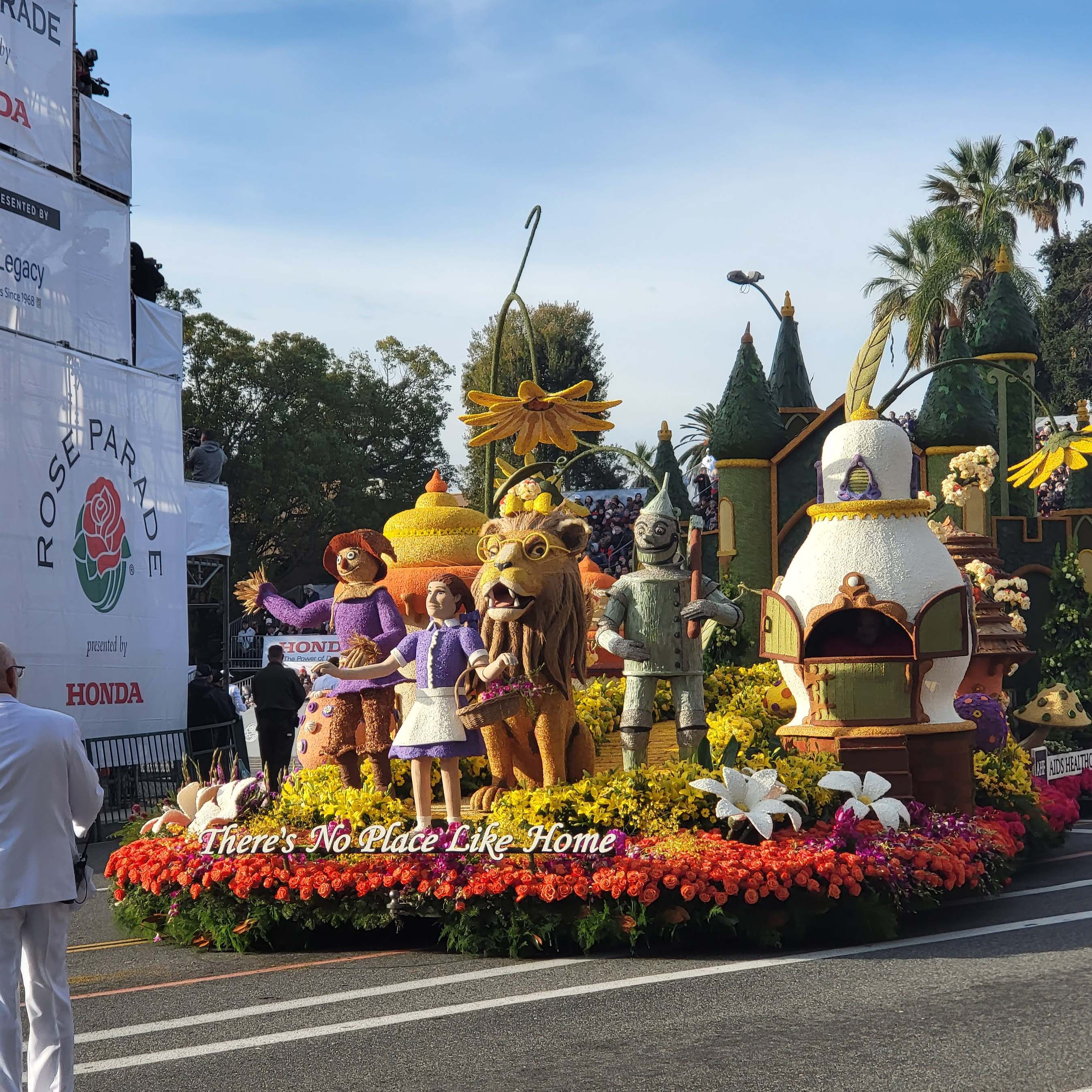
A The Wizard of Oz-themed float at the 2023 Rose Parade in Pasadena, California.

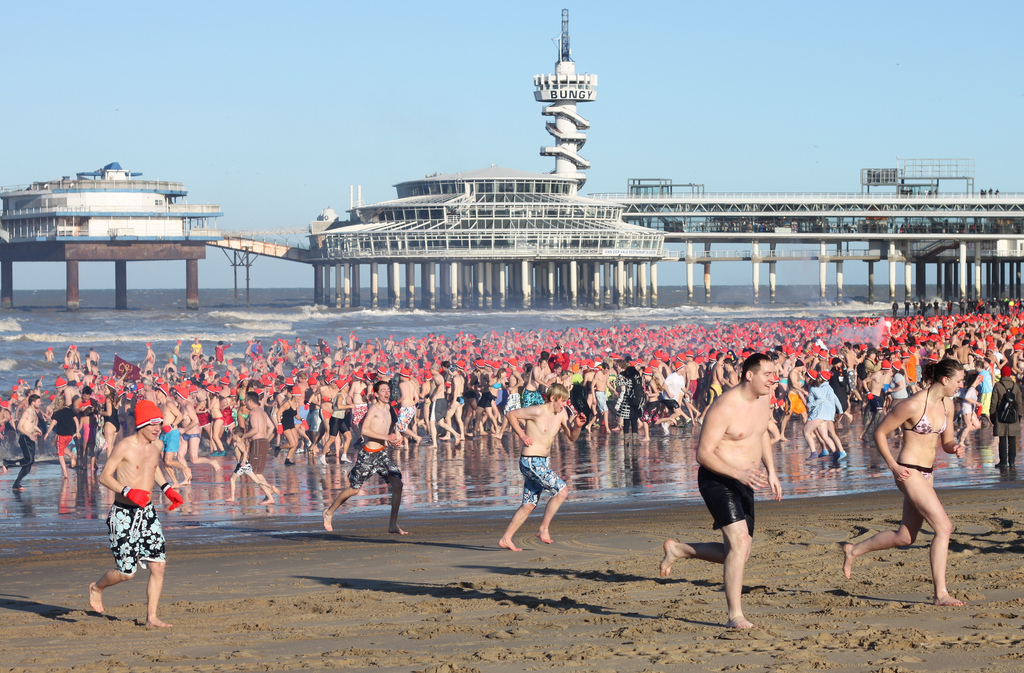
A scene of the "polar bear plunge", or Nieuwjaarsduik, at Scheveningen, Netherlands.

The celebrations and activities held worldwide on 1 January as part of New Year's Day commonly include the following:

- Pisan New Year's Day celebrations was a particular type of calendar in use in Pisa, Italy, and other areas of present-day Tuscany until the mid-18th century, which started the year on 25 March (the feast of the Annunciation of the Virgin Mary according to the liturgical calendar), anticipating its beginning by nine months and seven days compared to the "modern style" or "Circumcision style", still in use today, which indicates 1 January as the first day of the year;
- Several major parades are held on New Year's Day, including the London's New Year's Day Parade, Pasadena's Tournament of Roses Parade (also known as the "Rose Parade"), and Philadelphia's Mummers Parade. In the Bahamas, it is also associated with Junkanoos.
- Beginning in the 2010s, it is also the day that First Day Hikes takes place in the fifty state park systems of the United States.
- The Vienna Philharmonic orchestra traditionally performs a New Year's concert on the morning of New Year's Day.
- A "polar bear plunge" is a common tradition in some countries, where participants gather on beaches and run into the cold water. Polar Bear Clubs in many Northern Hemisphere cities have a tradition of holding organized plunges on New Year's Day, and they are often held to raise money for charity.
- In Ireland, New Year's Day was called Lá na gCeapairí, or the day of the buttered bread. A possible meaning to the consumption of buttered bread was to ward off hunger and famine in the coming year, by placing the buttered bread on the doorstep in the morning. Some traditions saw parties of young people calling from house to house to receive buttered bread and occasionally Poitín, or to give out buttered bread in exchange for pennies. This tradition has since died out, having been popular in the 19th century, and waning in the 1930s and 1940s.
- In Japan, Korea, and areas inhabited by the Inuit, Yupik, Aleut, Chukchi and the Iñupiat, watching the first sunrise is a tradition.
- In the United Kingdom and United States, New Year's Day is associated with several prominent sporting events:
  - In the United States, 1 January is the traditional date for several major post-season college football bowl games, including the Citrus Bowl in Orlando, the Outback Bowl in Tampa, the Rose Bowl Game in Pasadena, and the Sugar Bowl in New Orleans. Since 2025, the Rose and Sugar Bowl games have hosted two of the College Football Playoff quarter-finals, but will move to mid-January to host the semi-finals every three years. From 2008 to 2024, the National Hockey League hosted an annual outdoor game known as the Winter Classic on New Year's Day, which rotates between different host teams annually, and usually showcases a major regional rivalry. The NHL moved the Winter Classic off New Year's Day entirely in 2025 to avoid competition from the expanded College Football Playoff, with the 2025 edition held on New Year's Eve in prime time instead, and the 2026 game scheduled on 2 January.
    - If New Year's Day falls on a Sunday, bowl games traditionally held on New Year's Day are typically delayed to the following Monday in deference to the National Football League—which plays a Sunday game day as normal. The Rose Parade has similarly observed a "never on Sunday" rule since 1893, believing that a parade held on Sunday would scare horses and cause them to disrupt Sunday church services. The NHL also followed suit and delayed the Winter Classic in these cases, although it held a second outdoor game on New Year's Day in 2017—the NHL Centennial Classic—in addition to the Winter Classic to mark the beginning of the league's centennial year.
  - The Premier League in English football traditionally holds a fixture of matches on New Year's Day, stemming from the historic tradition of games being played over the Christmas holiday period (including, just as prominently, Boxing Day).
  - The final of the PDC World Darts Championship typically falls on New Year's Day.
  - The Cheltenham Racecourse holds a New Year's Day fixture, which includes the Fairlawne Handicap Chase, Dipper Novices' Chase, and Relkeel Hurdle.
- New Year's Day is a government and bank holiday in many countries.
- In the Southern United States, a variety of foods considered lucky are cooked and consumed on New Year's Day, including hopping John, red beans and rice, black-eyed peas and collard greens.
- In Sweden, pizza orders spike with some pizzerias bringing in extra staff to handle a surge in demand. Swedish media have described it as 'Pizza Day'.

=== Music ===
Music associated with New Year's Day comes in both classical and popular genres, and there is also Christmas song focus on the arrival of a new year during the Christmas and holiday season.

- Paul Gerhardt wrote the text for a hymn for the turn of the year, "Nun lasst uns gehn und treten", first published in 1653.
- Johann Sebastian Bach, in the Orgelbüchlein, composed three chorale preludes for the new year: Helft mir Gotts Güte preisen ["Help me to praise God's goodness"] (BWV 613); Das alte Jahr vergangen ist ["The old year has passed"] (BWV 614); and In dir ist freude ["In you is joy"] (BWV 615).
- The year is gone, beyond recall is a traditional Christian hymn to give thanks for the new year, dating back to 1713.
- In English-speaking countries, it is traditional to sing Auld Lang Syne at midnight on New Year's.

=== New Year's Day babies ===
A common image used, often as an editorial cartoon, is that of an incarnation of Father Time (or "the Old Year") wearing a sash across his chest with the previous year printed on it passing on his duties to the Baby New Year (or "the New Year"), an infant wearing a sash with the new year printed on it.

Babies born on New Year's Day are commonly called New Year babies. Hospitals, such as the Dyersburg Regional Medical Center in the US, give out prizes to the first baby born in that hospital in the new year. These prizes are often donated by local businesses. Prizes may include various baby-related items such as baby formula, baby blankets, diapers, and gift certificates to stores which specialise in baby-related merchandise.

=== Antarctica ===
On New Year's Day in Antarctica, the stake marking the geographic south pole is moved approximately 10 meters to compensate for the movement of the ice. A new marker stake is designed and made each year by staff at the site nearby.

== See also ==
- First Night
- List of films set around New Year
- List of winter festivals
- Rosh Hashanah
- Saint Sylvester's Day
- New Year's Six
