= Shona calendar =

Calendar used in South Africa

The Shona calendar is used by the Shona people in Southern Africa. The original calendar had 13 months and was based on the lunar cycle.

== Days ==
Sunday	Svondo
Monday	Muvhuro
Tuesday	Chipiri
Wednesday	Chitatu
Thursday	China
Friday	Chishanu
Saturday	Mugovera

== Months ==
The months in Shona are named after relevant events to the Shona. Things involving spiritual activities and agriculture, as well animals and fruits serve as derivatives for month names. For example, November, known as Mbudzi in Shona, means goat. This is a sacred month, many activities such as marriage, eloping, and (kurova makuva) tomb rituals are forbidden; this time is also seen as a time when most goats are pregnant. Therefore, killing goats is seen as taboo during this month. Another example would be the month of August, known as Nyamavhuvhu, meaning the windy one, as this is the windiest month of the year.

English	Shona	Meaning
January	Ndira	The time we harvest hohwa hwe ndira (where ndira means a kind of mushrooms)
February	Kukadzi	Female
March	Kurume	Male
April	Kubvumbi	Month of showers
May	Chivabvu	Last green maize
June	Chikumi	Halfway through (chikumi) of the 12 months (zigumi) in the context of the 12 months of the year.
July	Chikunguru	Chikungurutsa janga. The time where we have the wind that has a rolling effect on the maize and plant stalks that have been left over after harvest.
August	Nyamavhuvhu	The time we have the blowing wind.
September	Gunyana	The time where gunyana gweshiri (nestlings) start showing up after the windy months.
October	Gumiguru	Tenth month
November	Mbudzi	Translates to Goat. During this month, goats are said to not give birth. As such, it is considered a taboo for a couple within the Shona societies to get married in November.
December	Zvita	A time of giving thanks for having made it through the year. Derived from mazvita, which means 'thank you'.

== See also ==
- Xhosa calendar
- Zulu calendar
- Sesotho calendar
