= Nun laßt uns Gott dem Herren =

German Lutheran Hymn

"Nun lasst uns Gott dem Herren"
- Lutheran hymn
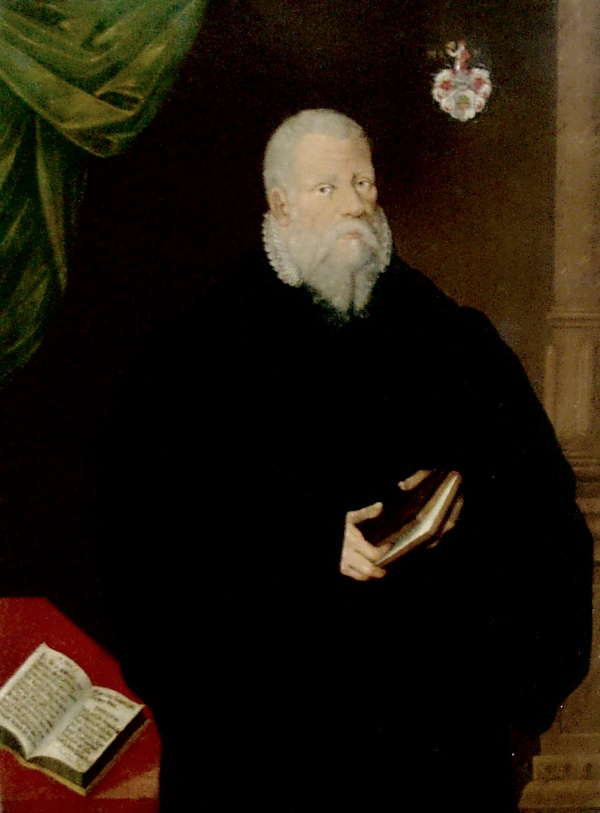
- The lyricist, painting in Divi Blasii
- Catalogue: Zahn 159
- Written: 1575
- Text: by Ludwig Helmbold
- Language: German
- Melody: Balthasar Musculus; Nikolaus Selnecker
- Composed: 1587

"Nun lasst uns Gott dem Herren" ("Now let us thank God, the Lord" or "Now let us come with singing") is a Lutheran hymn of 1575 with words by Ludwig Helmbold. It is a song of thanks, with the incipit: "Nun lasst uns Gott dem Herren Dank sagen und ihn ehren" (Now let us say thanks to God, the Lord, and honour him). The melody, Zahn No. 159, was published by Nikolaus Selnecker in 1587. The song appears in modern German hymnals, including in the Protestant Evangelisches Gesangbuch as EG 320.

== History ==
Ludwig Helmbold was a pedagogue who chose a simple meter of four lines of equal length for the hymn, a format that he used for most of his hymns. According to the header, it was intended as a sung prayer of thanks after a meal: "Eyn Dyncklied, nach essens, vnd sunst, fur allerley Wolthaten Gottes ..." (A song of thanks, after meals, and otherwise, for several of God's benefactions). It was published in Mülhausen in 1575. The title page is lost, but was probably like a later 1589 edition, Geistliche Lieder / den Gottseligen Christen zugericht. It appeared in the hymnal Neu Leipziger Gesangbuch by Gottfried Vopelius in 1682, and in the collection Harmonischer Lieder-Schatz by Johann Balthasar König in 1738.

The song appears in German hymnals, including in the Protestant Evangelisches Gesangbuch as EG 320. It appears in 14 hymnals.

The hymn became a model for other hymns of thanks, including Paul Gerhardt's "Nun lasst uns gehn und treten", a song for New Year's Day which even follows the wording of the beginning, sung to the same tune.

== Melody and settings ==
The melody, Zahn 159, was possibly composed by Balthasar Musculus, edited by Nikolaus Selnecker when it appeared in 1587. As a general song of thanks and praise, the hymn was often reused by other composers. Dieterich Buxtehude composed a cantata, BuxWV 81. Johann Sebastian Bach used the chorale as the conclusion of two cantatas, his Weimar cantata for Trinity Sunday, O heilges Geist- und Wasserbad, BWV 165, and of his cantata for Reformation Day, Gott der Herr ist Sonn und Schild, BWV 79.

Vincent Lübeck composed six variations for organ. Sigfrid Karg-Elert based No. 31 of his 66 Chorale improvisations for organ, published in 1909, on the hymn. Max Drischner composed chorale preludes, including this hymn in 1945.
