= Nun lasst uns gehn und treten =

1653 Lutheran hymn by Paul Gerhardt

- Lutheran hymn
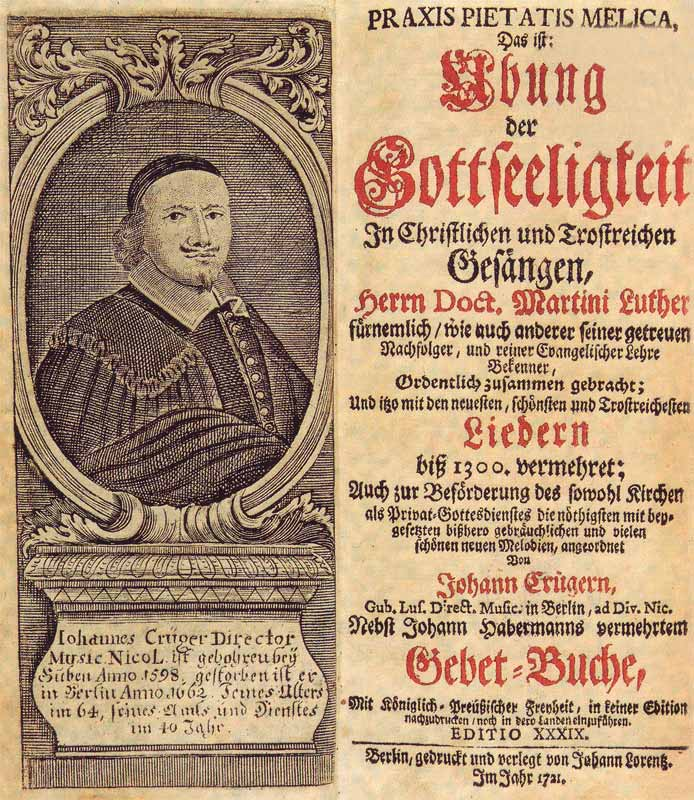
- Title page of Praxis pietatis melica, which contained the hymn in the 1653 edition
- Occasion: New Year's Day
- Text: by Paul Gerhardt
- Language: German
- Melody: Nikolaus Selnecker; Johann Crüger
- Composed: 1587
- Published: 1653

"Nun lasst uns gehn und treten" (Now let us go and walk) is a Lutheran hymn for New Year's Day by Paul Gerhardt. It appeared first in 1653 in Praxis pietatis melica. It is sung to the melody of "Nun laßt uns Gott dem Herren".

== History ==
Paul Gerhardt, then a Lutheran pastor at the Nikolaikirche in Berlin, wrote the text of "Nun lasst uns gehn und treten" in 15 stanzas for the beginning of a new year. He wrote the lyrics to go with the melody of Ludwig Helmbold's" Nun laßt uns Gott dem Herren". It appeared in the 1653 edition of Johann Crüger's hymnal Praxis pietatis melica, in the section Vom neuen Jahre (Of the new year). The content of the 10th stanza has supported the assumption that it was first published in the lost 1648 edition.

The hymn is contained in Protestant hymnals, including in the German Evangelisches Gesangbuch as EG 58, in the Swiss Reformed Hymnal as RG 548, in the Mennonitisches Gesangbuch as MG 273, and in Feiern & Loben as FL 230. It is part of 81 hymnals internationally.

== Text and theme ==
Gerhardt developed his thoughts in 15 stanzas of four lines each, all of equal length, which rhyme AABB. He begins in the first stanza with a call to us to move towards the presence of God with singing and praying, recognizing him as the source of life and strength. In this song, as in others, Gerhardt connects walking and singing, as in a Wanderlied. The turn of a new year is an invitation to reflect on what is worthy to be continued. The hymn is structured in two parts of equal length and a concluding stanza. The first part looks at the past time, in the first person plural as a group or congregation, the second part contains prayers for concerns in the future, occasionally switching to a singular singer.

The text is, according to the Protestant hymnal Evangelisches Gesangbuch:

1. Nun laßt uns gehn und treten
mit Singen und mit Beten
zum Herrn, der unserm Leben
bis hierher Kraft gegeben.

2. Wir gehn dahin und wandern
von einem Jahr zum andern,
wir leben und gedeihen
vom alten bis zum neuen

3. durch so viel Angst und Plagen,
durch Zittern und durch Zagen,
durch Krieg und große Schrecken,
die alle Welt bedecken.

4. Denn wie von treuen Müttern
in schweren Ungewittern
die Kindlein hier auf Erden
mit Fleiß bewahret werden,

5. also auch und nicht minder
läßt Gott uns, seine Kinder,
wenn Not und Trübsal blitzen,
in seinem Schoße sitzen.

6. Ach Hüter unsres Lebens,
fürwahr, es ist vergebens
mit unserm Tun und Machen,
wo nicht dein Augen wachen.

7. Gelobt sei deine Treue,
die alle Morgen neue;
Lob sei den starken Händen,
die alles Herzleid wenden.

8. Laß ferner dich erbitten,
o Vater, und bleib mitten
in unserm Kreuz und Leiden
ein Brunnen unsrer Freuden.

9. Gib mir und allen denen,
die sich von Herzen sehnen
nach dir und deiner Hulde,
ein Herz, das sich gedulde.

10. Schließ zu die Jammerpforten
und laß an allen Orten
auf so viel Blutvergießen
die Freudenströme fließen.

11. Sprich deinen milden Segen
zu allen unsern Wegen,
laß Großen und auch Kleinen
die Gnadensonne scheinen.

12. Sei der Verlaßnen Vater,
der Irrenden Berater,
der Unversorgten Gabe,
der Armen Gut und Habe.

13. Hilf gnädig allen Kranken,
gib fröhliche Gedanken
den hochbetrübten Seelen,
die sich mit Schwermut quälen.

14. Und endlich, was das meiste,
füll uns mit deinem Geiste,
der uns hier herrlich ziere
und dort zum Himmel führe.

15. Das alles wollst du geben,
o meines Lebens Leben,
mir und der Christen Schare
zum sel’gen neuen Jahre.

Gerhardt uses binomials frequently, such as gehn und treten (go and walk) and tun und machen (do and make). In the second stanza, the movement is interpreted as a walk in time, which is described in the following stanzas as many forms of hardship: Angst (anxiety), Schrecken (terror), Blutvergießen (shedding of blood), all caused by the experience of the Thirty Years' War which hit the Brandenburg region hard. Gerhardt contrasts them with the biblical images, of the consoling mother as in Isaiah 66:13, the protecting father as 1 John 1:18, and in the sixth stanza the experience expressed in Psalm 127:1 that human building is futile if the Lord does not support it. At the central point, the seventh stanza, Gerhardt expresses that the goodness and mercy of the Lord, new every morning, sustain us, according to Lamentations 13:22.

The wording of the second part is based on the General Intercessions (Allgemeines Kirchengebet) which traditionally included prayers for the church, all parishes around the world, the local parish and its clergy, widows and orphans, emperor and nation, peace in the world, fertility of the soil and good weather, enemies and persecutors, and in general people in need.

== Legacy ==
The song helped people in distress, such as Jochen Klepper who wrote in his diary at the beginning of 1942, the last year of his life, that single stanzas of the song carried weight against an expanse of horror (Weite des Grauens) that he anticipated. At the turn of the year 1944/45, Hildegard Schaeder, imprisoned at the Ravensbrück concentration camp, wrote the song down on a sheet to console herself and others; the sheet is kept in the memorial exhibition at the camp.

== Melody and musical settings ==
The melody goes back to Nikolaus Selnecker's tune from 1587, which Johann Crüger adapted for his hymnal. Max Reger composed a setting for three women's voices, Op. 79g.
