= Zulu calendar =

Calendar used by the Zulu people

The Zulu calendar is the traditional lunisolar calendar used by the Zulu people of South Africa. Its new year begins at the new moon of uMandulo (September) in the Gregorian calendar.

The calendar is divided into two seasons, the summer and Winter ubuSika. The lunar seasonal calendar has 13 months that do not correspond to the months of the Gregorian calendar.

Twelve(inyanga) of the Zulu calendar have around 28 days. Zulu names for the lunar months are based on observations of nature and seasonal activities. A 13th intercalary month (iNdida) lasts four to five days.

According to Keith Snedegar, consensus was used to settle arguments over the correct month, which arose around every three years when the 12 lunar months failed to correspond to their natural markers. The extra month was sometimes referred to as Ndid'amDoda (the month that puzzles men). Scottish Free Kirk missionary James Macdonald wrote that the confusion was settled with heliacal rising of Pleiades, which is associated with the month of uNhlangulana.

== Months (Izinyanga Zonyaka) ==
Month	Zulu name	Notes
January	uMasingana (let us search)	May refer to searching for ripening crops or even pumpkins
February	uNhlolanja (inspecting dogs)	This is when dogs begin mating, and owners inspect which dogs are gestating.
March	uNdasa (well-fed)	This is when food is more abundant.
April	uMbasa (sweeping the threshing grounds)	This is when cattle are satiated, lying down in the ground and appearing sick.
May	uNhlaba (aloe plant)	This is when the aloe plants start to bloom.
June	uNhlangulana (scattering)	This is when winds blow leaves off trees and the ground.
July	uNtulikazi/uMaquba (with dusts)	This is the month when the winds blow up dust.
August	uNcwaba (glossy)	New grass after veld-burning
September	uMandulo (cultivation)	Start of the farming season. Formerly known as uMpandu, but its name was changed to uMandulo out of respect for King Mpande.
October	uMfumfu (Krossland Ndiweni)	May refer to the blooming of flowers, or the growth of maize and sorghum.
November	uLwezi (a species of froghopper)	This is because of the influx of insects that feast on spring leaves
December	uZibandlela (ignore the path)	May refer to grass growing over the roads and confusing travelers.

== Festivals ==
- Umkhosi Wokweshwama
- Umkhosi woMhlanga
- uMathayi Marula Festival - In Umkhanyakude District, the Tembe clan harvests the marula fruit. Older women from the clan deliver their crops to their chief.

== See also ==
- Xhosa calendar
- Sesotho calendar
- Shona calendar
- Akan calendar
- Igbo calendar
- Yoruba calendar
