= Sotho calendar =

Translation of the Gregorian calendar

- Notes: The orthography used in this and related articles is that of South Africa, not Lesotho. For a discussion of the differences between the two see the notes on Sesotho orthography.

The Sesotho language has traditional names for the months of the familiar Gregorian calendar. The names reflect a deep connection that the Basotho people traditionally have with the natural world and the importance of agriculture.

Although the month names are often not used by the general public (being considered part of "deep Sesotho"), they are regularly used in news broadcasts and other media and are more common than English imports.

Additionally, the names of the seasons and the days of the week are regularly used by all speakers.

== Months ==
The names of the months (dikgwedi) indicate special natural and agricultural events which traditionally happened during the period. Being cattle breeders who lived in the semi-arid regions of southern Africa, a deep understanding of agriculture and the natural world was essential for the survival of the Basotho people.

The year begins roughly in the month of August when the seeds are planted in anticipation of the next month's explosion of life, originally they are believed to be 13 months in a calendar, the Basotho's calendar has 28 days and 13th months.

1. Phato (Pht.) (August) – from the verb -fata (dig) as the barren fields are ploughed and prepared in anticipation of the next months explosion of life.
2. Lwetse (L.) (September) – the grass grows and the cows grow fat on it. They produce so much milk that the expression lebese le wetse (the milk has spilled over) is used.
3. Mphalane (Mph.) (October) – this is a shortening of the compound noun Mphalane-ya-leshoma meaning "The flower shoots of the boophone disticha plant", and it said that this is the time when the flower starts producing shoots.
4. Pudungwana (Pn.) (November) – many wildebeest deliver their young in this month, and the name is a diminutive of pudumo (wildebeest).
5. Tshitwe (Tsh.) (December) – large numbers of a species of small grasshopper (tshitwe) are found at this time. Since cattle start producing less milk in this period, it is said that the cows are being milked by the tshitwe grasshoppers.
6. Pherekgong (Ph.) (January) – the crops begin to grow large and bird-scarers set up camp in their fields. They erect small structures and phera ka khong (set up the rafters using old pieces of dried wood)
7. Hlakola (Tlh.) (February) – the sorghum plants release a white substance (modula) signaling the emergence of the ears of corn. As the ears of corn emerge, it is said that the modula are being wiped off, and this name is a shortening of Hlakola-modula ("Wipe the modula off).
8. Hlakubele (Thlb.) (March) – the sorghum grains are visible and birds start eating them. The name is a compound noun from tlhaku tsa mabele (grains of sorghum)
9. Mmesa (M.) (April) – there are large numbers of a certain species of grasshopper known as mohlwane. Herd boys make fires at night and eat roasted maize with mohlwane. This gave rise to the proverb Mmesa mohlwane ha a panye (one needs to be diligent when doing a job, lit. the mohlwane roaster does not blink); the name comes from the first word in this proverb mmesa (the roaster).
10. Motsheanong (Mtsh.) (May) – the sorghum grains have become hard – too hard for the birds to eat them. It is said that the plants are laughing at the birds, and the name is a contraction of motsheha dinong (the one who laughs at the birds).
11. Phuptjane (Phn.) (June) – this is the beginning of Winter, and all plants seem to die and many wild animals leave on migrations. It is said that Nature is holding back on life. The name means "a small holding back" and is a diminutive of the name of the following month.
12. Phupu (Php.) (July) – everything seems completely dead and lifeless. Nature is holding back completely.

== Seasons ==
Like many other sub-Saharan African societies who historically lived in tropical regions, Sesotho-speaking people generally recognise only two seasons (dihla). However, names do exist for all four of the traditional western European seasons. The year begins in approximately August or September, when the crops are planted.

1. Selemo (spring) – from the verb -lema (plant) as the crops are planted at the beginning of this period. This is also the most common name for "year."
2. Lehlabula (summer) – more often than not this name is used for both the spring and the summer.
3. Lehwetla (autumn) – from the ancient Proto-Bantu root *-ginja ("hot season"). This noun is often used without the class prefix (that is, as Hwetla).
4. Mariha (winter) – from the ancient and widespread Proto-Bantu root *-tîka ("cold weather; cold season; night"). More often than not this name is used to denote both autumn and winter.

== Weekdays ==
The concept of dividing the month into four seven-day weeks (libeke, from Afrikaans "week") is a recent European innovation. The week begins on Monday.

1. Mantaha (Lp.) (Monday)
2. Labobeli (Lb.) (Tuesday) – Contraction of "letsatsi la bobedi" ("the second day").
3. Laboraro (Lr.) (Wednesday) – "the third one."
4. Labone (Ln.) (Thursday) – "the fourth one."
5. Labohlano (Lhl.) (Friday) – "the fifth one."
6. Moqebelo (Lq.) (Saturday) – from isiXhosa "uMgqibelo" ("Saturday, the ending") from the verb "ukugqiba" ("to finish").
7. Sontaha (Ls.) (Sunday) – Meaning "the day of the Lord".

== See also ==
- Xhosa calendar
- Zulu calendar
- Shona calendar
