= Xhosa calendar =

Timekeeping terminology in the Xhosa language

The following is a list of timekeeping terminology in the Xhosa language.

== Month names ==
=== Traditional ===
The traditional isiXhosa names for months of the year poetically come from names of stars, plants, and flowers that grow or seasonal changes that happen at a given time of year in Southern Africa.

The Xhosa year traditionally begins in June and ends in May when the brightest star visible in the Southern Hemisphere, Canopus, signals the time for harvesting.

In urban areas today, anglicized versions of the months are used, especially by the younger generation, but in the rural areas of the Eastern Cape, the old names still stand.

Month by month they are, in relation with:

=== Gregorian ===
English	Xhosa	Explanation of the months
January	EyoMqungu	month of the tambuki grass
February	EyoMdumba	month of the swelling grain
March	EyoKwindla	month of the Autumn
April	UTshazimpuzi	month of the Drying leaves
May	UCanzibe / EyeCanzibe	month of Canopus
June	EyeSilimela	month of the Pleiades
July	EyeKhala / EyeNtlaba	month of the aloes
August	EyeThupha	month of the buds
September	EyoMsintsi	month of the coast coral tree
October	EyeDwarha	month of the lilypad or yet tall yellow daisies
November	EyeNkanga	month of the small yellow daisies
December	EyoMnga	month of the acacia thorn tree

== Seasons ==
- Autumn - eKwindla
- Winter - uBusika
- Spring - iNtlako hlaza/iNtwasahlobo
- Summer - iHlobo

== Days of the week ==
- Sunday - iCawa
- Monday - uMvulo
- Tuesday - uLwesibini
- Wednesday - uLwesithathu
- Thursday - uLwesine
- Friday - uLwesihlanu
- Saturday - uMgqibelo

== See also ==
- Xhosa language
- Xhosa people
- Xhosa clan names
- Zulu calendar
