= Nikolaus Selnecker =

German musician, theologian and Protestant reformer

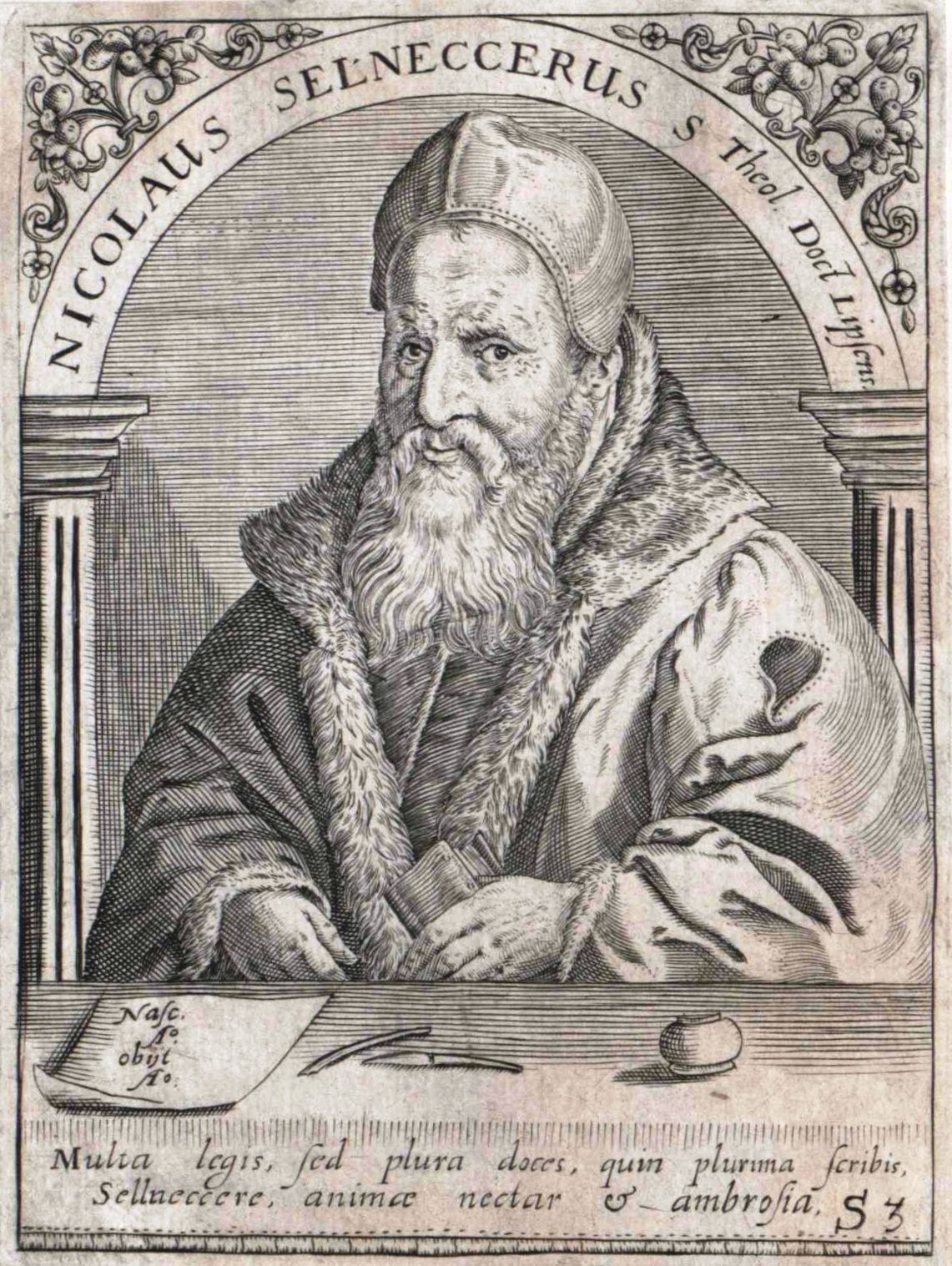
Nikolaus Selnecker

Nikolaus Selnecker (or Selneccer) (December 5, 1530 – May 24, 1592) was a German musician, theologian and Protestant reformer. He is now known mainly as a hymn writer. He is also known as one of the principal authors of the Formula of Concord along with Jakob Andreä and Martin Chemnitz.

== Biography ==
Nikolaus Selnecker was born in Hersbruck in Bavaria, Germany. His father moved him and his family to Nuremberg while he was still a child. At a young age he was an organist at the chapel in the Kaiserburg. He studied under Melanchthon at the University of Wittenberg, graduating M. A. in 1554. Later he was a chaplain and musician at the court of Augustus, Elector of Saxony in Dresden. Additionally he served as a court tutor and supervised education in the court chapel. He was later appointed professor of theology at Leipzig University, and pastor of St. Thomas's Church.

== Other sources ==
- Jungkuntz, Ted (2001) Formulators of the Formula of Concord: Four Architects of Lutheran Unity (Wipf and Stock Publishers) ISBN 9781579107437

== Related Reading ==
- Gritsch, Eric W. (2010) A History of Lutheranism (Fortress Press) ISBN 978-0800697129
