= List of concertos by Johann Sebastian Bach =

Johann Sebastian Bach's Violin Concertos, BWV 1041–1043, and his six Brandenburg Concertos survive in their original instrumentation. His harpsichord concertos are mostly adaptations of concertos originally written for other solo instruments.

In his early career Bach transcribed concertos by other composers for solo organ (BWV 592–596) and for solo harpsichord (BWV 972–987). Bach's Italian Concerto, composed in 1735, was one of his few works that he published during his life-time: it is an example of an unaccompanied concerto for two-manual harpsichord.

== Early encounters with the concerto genre ==
The earliest documentary traces of Bach's involvement with the concerto genre include:

- In 1709 Bach helped copy out the performance parts of a concerto by Georg Philipp Telemann
- Around 1710 or earlier Bach copied the continuo part, BWV Anh. 23, of a concerto included in Tomaso Albinoni's Op. 2, which had been published in 1700.

== Weimar concerto transcriptions ==
Bach wrote most, if not all, of his concerto transcriptions for organ (BWV 592–596) and for harpsichord (BWV 972–987) from July 1713 to July 1714. Most of these transcriptions were based on concertos by Antonio Vivaldi. Other models for the transcriptions included concertos by Alessandro Marcello, Benedetto Marcello, Georg Philipp Telemann and Prince Johann Ernst of Saxe-Weimar.

Weimar concerto transcriptions
BWV	Key	Instr.	Model
592	G major	organ	Johann Ernst of Saxe-Weimar: Violin Concerto in G major
592a	G major	harpsichord	Johann Ernst of Saxe-Weimar: Violin Concerto in G major; BWV 592
593	A minor	organ	Vivaldi, Op. 3 No. 8: Concerto in A minor for two violins and strings, RV 522
594	C major	organ	Vivaldi, RV 208: Violin Concerto in D major "Grosso Mogul" (variant RV 208a published as Op. 7 No. 11)
595	C major	organ	Johann Ernst of Saxe-Weimar: Violin Concerto in C major, first movement, and/or BWV 984/1
596	D minor	organ	Vivaldi, Op. 3 No. 11: Concerto in D minor for two violins, cello and strings, RV 565
972	D major	harpsichord	Vivaldi, Op. 3 No. 9: Violin Concerto in D major, RV 230; BWV 972a
972a	D major	harpsichord	Vivaldi, Op. 3 No. 9: Violin Concerto in D major, RV 230
973	G major	harpsichord	Vivaldi, RV 299: Violin Concerto in G major (published as Op. 7 No. 8)
974	D minor	harpsichord	Marcello, A.: Oboe Concerto in D minor
975	G minor	harpsichord	Vivaldi, RV 316 (variant RV 316a, Violin Concerto in G minor, published as Op. 4 No. 6)
976	C major	harpsichord	Vivaldi, Op. 3 No. 12: Violin Concerto in E major, RV 265
977	C major	harpsichord	
978	F major	harpsichord	Vivaldi, Op. 3 No. 3: Violin Concerto in G major, RV 310
979	B minor	harpsichord	Vivaldi, RV 813: Violin Concerto in D minor (formerly RV Anh. 10 attributed to Torelli)
980	G major	harpsichord	Vivaldi, RV 383: Violin Concerto in B♭ major, (variant RV 383a published as Op. 4 No. 1)
981	C minor	harpsichord	Marcello, B.: Concerto Op. 1 No. 2
982	B♭ major	harpsichord	Johann Ernst of Saxe-Weimar: Concerto Op. 1 No. 1
983	G minor	harpsichord	
984	C major	harpsichord	Johann Ernst of Saxe-Weimar: Violin Concerto in C major, and/or BWV 595
985	G minor	harpsichord	Telemann: Violin Concerto in G minor, TWV 51:g1
986	G major	harpsichord	
987	D minor	harpsichord	Johann Ernst of Saxe-Weimar: Concerto Op. 1 No. 4

== Concerto form in other compositions ==
=== Sonate auf Concertenart ===
The Sonate auf Concertenart (transl. sonata in the style of a concerto) format appears for example in Bach's organ sonatas.

=== In vocal compositions ===
Apart from adaptations of movements of his earlier concertos into his cantatas, Bach also directly composed movements of his vocal works in the concerto form: for example the opening chorus of his cantata BWV 7 has been described as having the format of an Italian violin concerto movement. Another example is the opening choral movement of Bach's Magnificat, the form of which only becomes, in Spitta's words, "thoroughly intelligible" when analysed as a concerto form.

== Harpsichord concertos ==
=== Concerto for two harpsichords, BWV 1061a ===
BWV 1061a, a concerto for two harpsichords without accompaniment, is Bach's original version of the Concerto for two harpsichords and strings, BWV 1061.

=== Italian Concerto, BWV 971 ===
Bach's Italian Concerto, BWV 971, was published in 1735, as first of two compositions included in Clavier-Übung II.

== Concerto as a vocal composition ==
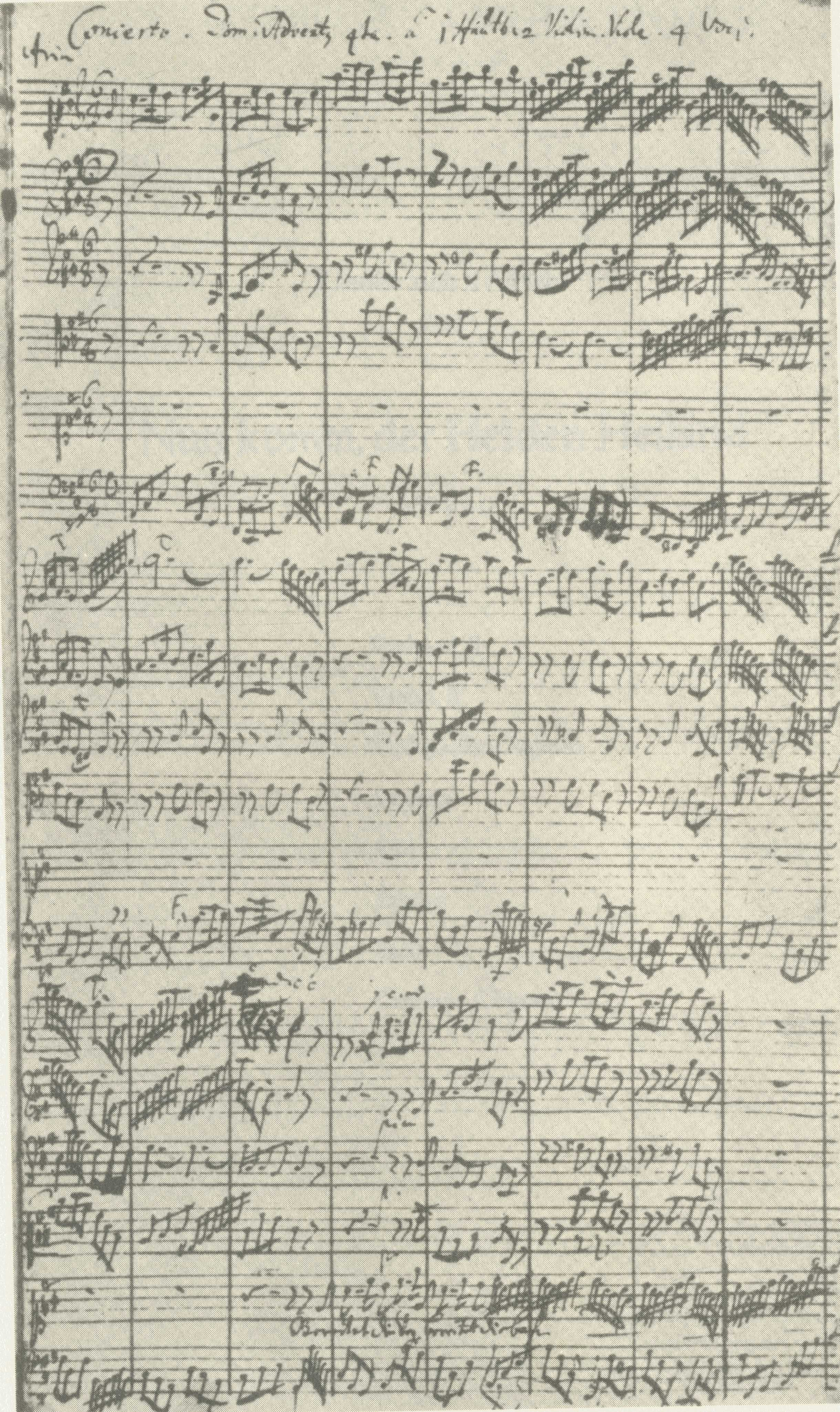
The caption of Bach's autograph score of the cantata Bereitet die Wege bereitet die Bahn, BWV 132 (D-B Mus. ms. Bach P 60) reads: "Concerto. Dom. Advent[us] 4ta. á 1 Hautb. 2 Violini. Viola. 4 Voci." (Concerto. 4th Sunday of Advent. For 1 oboe; 2 violins; viola; 4 voices)

Bach rarely used the name "Cantata" to indicate a vocal composition. Instead, "Concerto", closer to names of cantata precursors such as geistliches Konzert (spiritual concerto) and Choralkonzert (chorale concerto), is the name he used most often to indicate those compositions which later became known as his cantatas.

=== Sinfonia in D major, BWV 1045 ===
BWV 1045, a movement in concerto form for violin and orchestra, is the opening of a cantata titled "Concerto" in Bach's autograph ("J J Concerto. à 4 Voci. 3 Trombe, Tamburi, 2 Hautb: Violino ConC. 2 Violini, Viola e Cont."). The music breaks off before the vocalists enter. In the Bach-Werke-Verzeichnis it appears as "Konzertsatz in D" (Concerto movement in D major), in the range of the orchestral concertos (BWV 1041–65).

== Doubtful and spurious ==
For organ:

- BWV 571 – Fantasia (Concerto) in G major
- BWV 597 – Concerto in E♭ major

For harpsichord:

- BWV 909 – Concerto and Fugue in C minor
- BWV Anh. 151 – Concerto in C major
- BWV Anh. 152 – Concerto in G major
- BWV Anh. 188 – Sonata (Concerto) in F major for two harpsichords by Wilhelm Friedemann Bach (BR A12; F 10)

For chamber ensemble:

- BWV 525a (or: BWV deest) – Concerto (or: Trio Sonata) in C major for violin, cello and continuo (variant of BWV 525/1, 1032/2 and 525/3)

Orchestral concertos:

- BWV Anh. 22 – Concerto for Oboe and Violin in B♭ major [[[:scores:Concerto for Oboe and Violin in B♭ major, BWV Anh.22 (Bach, Johann Sebastian)|scores]]]
- BWV Anh. 155 – Concerto in A major for keyboard, strings and continuo by Wenzel Raimund Birck
- BWV Anh. 189 – Concerto in A minor for keyboard, strings and continuo by Carl Philipp Emanuel Bach

== Reconstructions ==
BWV 156/1, used for reconstructing the middle movement of concertos after BWV 1056 and 1059
BWV 156/1 arranged for violin and piano
Carrie Rehkopf (violin), 1729

Detailed accounts of possible or conjectural reconstructions of Bach's harpsichord concertos for other solo instruments have been described systematically in the hand-book of Siegbert Rampe. No discussion for reconstructions is needed concerning the well-known two violin concertos BWV 1041, BWV 1042 and the double violin concerto BWV 1043, since these predate the harpsichord versions, BWV 1058, BWV 1054 and BWV 1062 respectively. The concerto BWV 1057 for harpsichord and two flutes or recorders also has an extant original: the 4th Brandenburg Concerto, BWV 1049. The concerto for two unaccompanied harpsichords BWV 1061a was modified slightly by adding strings in the first and last movements to produce BWV 1061. Vivaldi's concerto for four violins Op. 3 No. 10 was reworked by Bach as his concerto for four harpsichords BWV 1065.

The 5th Brandenburg Concerto, BWV 1050, always was a concerto for flute, violin and harpsichord, also in its earlier version BWV 1050a. Earlier versions for unaccompanied keyboard instruments of all three movements of the Triple Concerto, BWV 1044, are extant. Other harpsichord concertos, and related cantata movements if available, have been the basis for several reconstructions. The letter "R", abbreviation of "Reconstruction", can be added to the BWV number of an extant Bach concerto to indicate a conjectured original of such concerto.

=== BWV 1052R ===
Based on BWV 1052, 1052a and/or on cantata movements BWV 146/1 (Sinfonia) and /2 (Chorus), and/or on what is known regarding the lost opening Sinfonia of BWV 188 (a variant of the third movement of BWV 1052 scored for oboe, strings and obligato organ):

- Violin Concerto in D minor
- Organ Concerto in D minor

=== BWV 1053R ===
Based on BWV 1053 and/or cantata movements BWV 169/1 (Sinfonia), /5 (Aria) and 49/1 (Sinfonia):

- Oboe d'amore Concerto in D major
- Oboe Concerto in F major
- Organ Concerto in D major

=== BWV 1055R ===
Based on BWV 1055:

- Oboe d'amore Concerto in A major

=== BWV 1056R ===
Based on BWV 1056 and/or (for the middle movement) BWV 156/1 (Sinfonia):

- Violin Concerto in G minor
- Oboe Concerto in G minor

=== BWV 1059R ===
Based on the BWV 1059 fragment and on cantata movements BWV 35/1 (Sinfonia of Part I), 156/1 (Sinfonia) or 35/2 (Aria), and 35/5 (Sinfonia of Part II):

- Harpsichord Concerto in D minor
- Oboe Concerto in D minor
- Organ Concerto in D minor

=== BWV 1060R ===
Based on BWV 1060:

- Concerto for Violin and Oboe in C minor
- Concerto for Violin and Oboe in D minor
- Concerto for Two Violins in C minor

=== BWV 1063R ===
Based on BWV 1063:

- Concerto for Violin, Oboe and Flute in D minor
- Concerto for Three Violins in D minor

=== BWV 1064R ===
Based on BWV 1064:

- Concerto for Three Violins in D major

== Sources ==
- Malcolm Boyd. Bach. Oxford University Press, 2006. ISBN 9780195307719
- Werner Breig, translated by Steward Spencer. "The instrumental music", pp. 123–135, and "Composition as arrangement and adaptation", pp. 154–170, in The Cambridge Companion to Bach, edited by John Butt. Cambridge University Press, 1997. ISBN 9780521587808
- H. Joseph Butler. "Emulation and Inspiration: J. S. Bach’s Transcriptions from Vivaldi’s L’estro armonico" in The Diapason, August 2011.
- Richard D. P. Jones. The Creative Development of Johann Sebastian Bach: Music to Delight the Spirit, Volume I: 1695-1717. Oxford University Press, 2007. ISBN 9780198164401
- Richard D. P. Jones. The Creative Development of Johann Sebastian Bach: Music to Delight the Spirit, Volume II: 1717-1750. Oxford University Press, 2013 ISBN 9780191503849
- Rampe, Siegbert (2013), Bachs Orchester- und Kammermusik, Bach-Handbuch (in German), vol. 5/1, Laaber-Verlag, ISBN 978-3-89007-455-9
- David Schulenberg. The Keyboard Music of J.S. Bach. Routledge, 2013. ISBN 9781136091469
- David Schulenberg. "Updates for The Keyboard Music of J. S. Bach" at faculty.wagner.edu/david-schulenberg/, 10 August 2016 (retrieved 9 December 2016)
- Eleanor Selfridge-Field. The Music of Benedetto and Alessandro Marcello: A Thematic Catalogue with Commentary on the Composers, Repertory, and Sources. Oxford University Press/Clarendon Press, 1990. ISBN 9780193161269
- Michael Talbot. The Vivaldi Compendium. Boydell Press, 2011. ISBN 9781843836704.
- Piotr Wilk, translated by Paweł Wróbel. "On the question of the Baroque instrumental concerto typology", pp. 83–102 in Musica Iagellonica, 2012.
- Peter Williams. The Organ Music of J. S. Bach. Cambridge University Press, 2003. ISBN 9780521891158
- Peter Williams. A Musical Biography. Cambridge University Press, 2016. ISBN 9781107139251
- Christoph Wolff. Johann Sebastian Bach: The Learned Musician. W. W. Norton, 2001. ISBN 9780393322569
