= List of orchestral works by Johann Sebastian Bach =

Structured list and sortable table covering Bach's orchestral suites and concertos

Orchestral works by Johann Sebastian Bach refers to the compositions in the eleventh chapter of the Bach-Werke-Verzeichnis (BWV, catalogue of Bach's compositions), or, in the New Bach Edition, the compositions in Series VII.

== Concertos ==
The orchestra of the concertos for one or more accompanied soloists (BWV 1041–1044, 1049–1050 and 1052–1065) consists in most cases of strings (two parts for violins and one viola part) and continuo (for example performed on cello and harpsichord). Such orchestra of the Baroque era can be indicated as string orchestra or chamber orchestra. In the 19th century, the Bach-Gesellschaft published Bach's concertos BWV 1041–1044 and 1046–1065 as chamber music – the designation as orchestral music becoming more common in the second half of the 20th century. Apart from the concertos for more than one performer listed in the sections below, Bach also wrote concertos for a single unaccompanied harpsichordist or organist:

- Weimar concerto transcriptions, BWV 592–596 and 972–987
- Italian Concerto, BWV 971

=== Violin concertos (BWV 1041–1043) ===
- BWV 1041 – Violin Concerto in A minor
- BWV 1042 – Violin Concerto in E major
- BWV 1043 – Double Concerto in D minor for two violins

=== Triple concerto (BWV 1044) ===
- BWV 1044 – Triple Concerto in A minor for traverso, violin and harpsichord

=== Opening movement for a cantata, for violin and orchestra (BWV 1045) ===
- BWV 1045 – Fragment of a sinfonia in D major for violin and orchestra, from an unknown cantata

=== Brandenburg concertos (BWV 1046–1051) ===
- BWV 1046.1, formerly BWV 1046a, originally BWV 1071 – Sinfonia in F major (early version of Brandenburg Concerto No. 1)
- BWV 1046.2, formerly BWV 1046 – Brandenburg Concerto No. 1 in F major for violino piccolo, three oboes, bassoon, two corni da caccia, strings and continuo
- BWV 1047 – Brandenburg Concerto No. 2 in F major for trumpet, oboe, recorder, violin, strings and continuo
- BWV 1048 – Brandenburg Concerto No. 3 in G major for three violins, three violas, three cellos and continuo
- BWV 1049 – Brandenburg Concerto No. 4 in G major for violin, two fiauti d'echo (recorders), strings and continuo
- BWV 1050.1, formerly BWV 1050a – Concerto in D major for harpsichord, violin, traverso and strings (early version of Brandenburg Concerto No. 5)
- BWV 1050.2, formerly BWV 1050 – Brandenburg Concerto No. 5 in D major for harpsichord, violin, traverso and strings
- BWV 1051 – Brandenburg Concerto No. 6 in B-flat major for two violas, two violas da gamba, cello and continuo

=== Keyboard concertos (BWV 1052–1065) ===
- BWV 1052.1, formerly BWV 1052a – Concerto for harpsichord and strings in D minor
- BWV 1052.2, formerly BWV 1052 – Concerto for harpsichord and strings in D minor (revised version)
- BWV 1053 – Concerto for harpsichord and strings in E major
- BWV 1054 – Concerto for harpsichord and strings in D major (after BWV 1042, Violin Concerto in E major)
- BWV 1055 – Concerto for harpsichord and strings in A major
- BWV 1056 – Concerto for harpsichord and strings in F minor
- BWV 1057 – Concerto for harpsichord, two recorders and strings in F major (after BWV 1049, Brandenburg Concerto No. 4 in G major)
- BWV 1058 – Concerto for harpsichord and strings in G minor (after BWV 1041, Violin Concerto in A minor)
- BWV 1059 – Fragment of a concerto for harpsichord in D minor
- BWV 1060 – Concerto for two harpsichords and strings in C minor
- BWV 1061.1, formerly BWV 1061a – Concerto for two harpsichords in C major (without orchestral accompaniment)
- BWV 1061.2, formerly BWV 1061 – Concerto for two harpsichords and strings in C major
- BWV 1062 – Concerto for two harpsichords and strings in C minor (after BWV 1043, Double Violin Concerto in D minor)
- BWV 1063 – Concerto for three harpsichords and strings in D minor
- BWV 1064 – Concerto for three harpsichords and strings in C major
- BWV 1065 – Concerto for four harpsichords and strings in A minor (after Antonio Vivaldi's concerto for four violins in B minor, RV 580, L'estro Armonico, Op. 3 No. 10)

=== Reconstructed concertos ===
In Series VII of the New Bach Edition:

- BWV 1052R – Violin concerto in D minor
- BWV 1055R – Oboe d'amore concerto in A major
- BWV 1056R – Violin concerto in G minor
- BWV 1060R – Concerto for oboe and violin in C minor
- BWV 1064R – Concerto for three violins in D major

== Suites (BWV 1066–1070) ==
- BWV 1066 – Orchestral Suite No. 1 in C major (for woodwinds, strings and continuo); Movements: [Ouverture] (no description, two sections), Courante, Gavotte I & II, Forlane, Menuet I & II, Bourrée I & II, Passepied I & II
- BWV 1067 – Orchestral Suite No. 2 in B minor (for traverso, strings and continuo); Movements: [Ouverture] (no description, two sections), Rondeau, Sarabande, Bourrée I & II, Polonaise & Double, Menuet, Badinerie
- BWV 1068 – Orchestral Suite No. 3 in D major (for oboes, trumpets, timpani, strings and continuo); Movements: [Ouverture] (no description, two sections), Air, Gavotte I & II, Bourrée, Gigue
- BWV 1069 – Orchestral Suite No. 4 in D major (for oboes, bassoon, trumpets, timpani, strings and continuo); Movements: [Ouverture] (no description, two sections), Bourrée I & II, Gavotte, Menuet I & II, Rejouissance
- BWV 1070 – Orchestral Suite in G minor by an unknown composer

== Sinfonia (BWV 1071) ==
- BWV 1071, renumbered as BWV 1046a: early version of the first Brandenburg Concerto.

== Orchestral works in the 11th chapter of the Bach-Werke-Verzeichnis (1998) ==
Legend to the table
column		content
1	BWV	Bach-Werke-Verzeichnis (lit. 'Bach-works-catalogue'; BWV) numbers. Anhang (Annex; Anh.) numbers are indicated as follows: preceded by I: in Anh. I (lost works) of BWV^{1} (1950 first edition of the BWV); preceded by II: in Anh. II (doubtful works) of BWV^{1}; preceded by III: in Anh. III (spurious works) of BWV^{1}; preceded by N: new Anh. numbers in BWV^{2} (1990) and/or BWV^{2a} (1998)
2	^{2a}	Section in which the composition appears in BWV^{2a}: Chapters of the main catalogue indicated by Arabic numerals (1-13); Anh. sections indicated by Roman numerals (I–III); Reconstructions published in the NBE indicated by "R"
3	Date	Date associated with the completion of the listed version of the composition. Exact dates (e.g. for most cantatas) usually indicate the assumed date of first (public) performance. When the date is followed by an abbreviation in brackets (e.g. JSB for Johann Sebastian Bach) it indicates the date of that person's involvement with the composition as composer, scribe or publisher.
4	Name	Name of the composition: if the composition is known by a German incipit, that German name is preceded by the composition type (e.g. cantata, chorale prelude, motet, ...)
5	Key	Key of the composition
6	Scoring	See scoring table below for the abbreviations used in this column
7	BG	Bach Gesellschaft-Ausgabe (BG edition; BGA): numbers before the colon indicate the volume in that edition. After the colon an Arabic numeral indicates the page number where the score of the composition begins, while a Roman numeral indicates a description of the composition in the Vorwort (Preface) of the volume.
8	NBE	New Bach Edition (German: Neue Bach-Ausgabe, NBA): Roman numerals for the series, followed by a slash, and the volume number in Arabic numerals. A page number, after a colon, refers to the "Score" part of the volume. Without such page number, the composition is only described in the "Critical Commentary" part of the volume. The volumes group Bach's compositions by genre: 1. Cantatas (Vol. 1–34: church cantatas grouped by occasion; Vol. 35–40: secular cantatas; Vol. 41: Varia); 2. Masses, Passions, Oratorios (12 volumes); 3. Motets, Chorales, Lieder (4 volumes); 4. Organ Works (11 volumes); 5. Keyboard and Lute Works (14 volumes); 6. Chamber Music (5 volumes); 7. Orchestral Works (7 volumes); 8. Canons, Musical Offering, Art of Fugue (3 volumes); 9. Addenda (approximately 7 volumes)
9	Additional info	may include: "after" – indicating a model for the composition; "by" – indicating the composer of the composition (if different from Johann Sebastian Bach); "in" – indicating the oldest known source for the composition; "pasticcio" – indicating a composition with parts of different origin; "see" – composition renumbered in a later edition of the BWV; "text" – by text author, or, in source; Provenance of standard texts and tunes, such as Lutheran hymns and their chorale melodies, Latin liturgical texts (e.g. Magnificat) and common tunes (e.g. Folia), are not usually indicated in this column. For an overview of such resources used by Bach, see individual composition articles, and overviews in, e.g., Chorale cantata (Bach)#Bach's chorale cantatas, List of chorale harmonisations by Johann Sebastian Bach#Chorale harmonisations in various collections and List of organ compositions by Johann Sebastian Bach#Chorale Preludes.
10	BD	Bach Digital Work page

Legend for abbreviations in "Scoring" column
Voices (see also SATB)
a	A	b	B	s	S	t	T	v			V	
alto (solo part)	alto (choir part)	bass (solo part)	bass (choir part)	soprano (solo part)	soprano (choir part)	tenor (solo part)	tenor (choir part)	voice (includes parts for unspecified voices or instruments as in some canons)			vocal music for unspecified voice type	
Winds and battery (bold = soloist)
Bas	Bel	Cnt	Fl	Hn	Ob	Oba	Odc	Tai	Tbn	Tdt	Tmp	Tr
bassoon (can be part of Bc, see below)	bell(s) (musical bells)	cornett, cornettino	flute (traverso, flauto dolce, piccolo, flauto basso)	natural horn, corno da caccia, corno da tirarsi, lituo	oboe	oboe d'amore	oboe da caccia	taille	trombone	tromba da tirarsi	timpani	tromba (natural trumpet, clarino trumpet)
Strings and keyboard (bold = soloist)
Bc		Hc	Kb	Lu	Lw	Org	Str	Va	Vc	Vdg	Vl	Vne
basso continuo: Vdg, Hc, Vc, Bas, Org, Vne and/or Lu		harpsichord	keyboard (Hc, Lw, Org or clavichord)	lute, theorbo	Lautenwerck (lute-harpsichord)	organ (/man. = manualiter, without pedals)	strings: Vl I, Vl II and Va	viola(s), viola d'amore, violetta	violoncello, violoncello piccolo	viola da gamba	violin(s), violino piccolo	violone, violone grosso

Background colours
Colour	Meaning
green	extant or clearly documented partial or complete manuscript (copy) by Bach and/or first edition under Bach's supervision
yellow	extant or clearly documented manuscript (copy) or print edition, in whole or in part, by close relative, i.e. brother (J. Christoph), wife (A. M.), son (W. F. / C. P. E. / J. C. F. / J. Christian) or son-in-law (Altnickol)
orange-brown	extant or clearly documented manuscript (copy) by close friend and/or pupil (Kellner, Krebs, Kirnberger, Walther, ...), or distant family member

Orchestral works in Chapter 11 of BWV^{2a}
BWV	^{2a}	Date	Name	Key	Scoring	BG	NBE	Additional info	BD
1041	11.	1730	Concerto for violin and orchestra No. 1	A min.	**Vl** Str Bc	21^{1}: 3; 45^{1}: 233	VII/3: 3	→ BWV 1058	01223
1042	11.		Concerto for violin and orchestra No. 2	E maj.	**Vl** Str Bc	21^{1}: 21	VII/3: 35	→ BWV 1054	01224
1043	11.	1730–1731 or earlier	Concerto for 2 violins and orchestra – Double Concerto	D min.	**2Vl** Str Bc	21^{1}: 41	VII/3: 71	→ BWV 1062	01225
1044	11.	1727 or later	Concerto for flute, violin, harpsichord and orchestra – Triple Concerto	A min.	**Fl Vl Hc** Str Bc	17: 223	VII/3: 105	after BWV 894/1, 527/2, 894/2	01226
1045	11.	1743–1746	Cantata opening: "Concerto" (Symphonic movement for violin and orchestra)	D maj.	**Vl** 3Tr Tmp 2Ob Str Bc	21^{1}: 65	I/34: 305	after unknown model by other composer?	01227
1046.2	11.	1721-03-24	Brandenburg Concerto No. 1	F maj.	2Nho 3Ob Bas Vlp Str Bc	19: 3	VII/2: 3	after BWV 1046.1; /3, /7 → BWV 207(a)/1, /5a	01228
1046.1	11.	c.1712- 1713?	Sinfonia (opening of BWV 208?)	F maj.	2Nho 3Ob Str Bas Bc	31^{1}: 69	VII/2: 225	→ BWV 1046.2; /1 → BWV 52/1; was BWV 1046a, 1071	01229
1047	11.	1721-03-24	Brandenburg Concerto No. 2	F maj.	Tr Fl Ob Vl Str Vne Bc	19: 3	VII/2: 43		01230
1048	11.	1721-03-24	Brandenburg Concerto No. 3	G maj.	3Vl 3Vla 3Vc Vne Hc	19: 3	VII/2: 73	→ BWV 174/1	01231
1049	11.	1721-03-24	Brandenburg Concerto No. 4	G maj.	Vl 2Fl Str Vc Vne Bc	19: 3	VII/2: 99	→ BWV 1057	01232
1050.2	11.	1721-03-24	Brandenburg Concerto No. 5 (early version)	D maj.	**Fl Vl Hc** Vl Va Vc Vne	19: 3	VII/2: 145	after BWV 1050.1	01233
1050.1	11.	1720–1721	Brandenburg Concerto No. 5 (revised version)	D maj.	**Fl Vl Hc** Vl Va Vne	19: 3	VII/2: 145	→ BWV 1050.2	01234
1051	11.	1721-03-24	Brandenburg Concerto No. 6	B♭ maj.	2Vla 2Gam Vc Vne Hc	19: 3	VII/2: 197		01235
1052.2	11.	c.1738	Concerto for harpsichord and orchestra No. 1 (revised version)	D min.	**Hc** Str Bc	17: 3	VII/4: 3	after BWV 1052.1, BWV 146/1, /2 and 188/1	01236
1052.1	11.	before 1726	Concerto for harpsichord and orchestra No. 1 (early version)	D min.	**Hc** Str Bc	17: 3	VII/4: 317	by Bach, C. P. E.?; → BWV 1052.2, BWV 146/1, /2 and 188/1	01237
1053	11.	c.1738	Concerto for harpsichord and orchestra No. 2	E maj.	**Hc** Str Bc	17: 3	VII/4: 79	after BWV 169/1, /5 and 49/1	01238
1054	11.	c.1738	Concerto for harpsichord and orchestra No. 3	D maj.	**Hc** Str Bc	17: 3	VII/4: 127	after BWV 1042	01239
1055	11.	c.1738	Concerto for harpsichord and orchestra No. 4	A maj.	**Hc** Str Bc	17: 3	VII/4: 161	after BWV 1055R?	01240
1056	11.	c.1738	Concerto for harpsichord and orchestra No. 5	F min.	**Hc** Str Bc	17: 3	VII/4: 197	after BWV 1056R?; /2 after BWV 156/1	01241
1057	11.	c.1738	Concerto for harpsichord and orchestra No. 6	F maj.	**Hc** 2Fl Str Bc	17: 3	VII/4: 221	after BWV 1049	01242
1058	11.	c.1738	Concerto for harpsichord and orchestra No. 7	G min.	**Hc** Str Bc	17: 3	VII/4: 283	after BWV 1041	01243
1059	11.	c.1738	Concerto for harpsichord and orchestra No. 8 (abandoned fragment of 1st movement)	D min.	**Hc** Ob Str Bc	17: 3	VII/4: 313	after BWV 35/1 and earlier model (for oboe?); completions/ reconstructions usually based on BWV 35/1, /2 and /5	01244
1060	11.	c.1736	Concerto for 2 harpsichords and orchestra No. 1	C min.	**2Hc** Str Bc	21^{2}: 3	VII/5: 3	after BWV 1060R?	01245
1061.2	11.	after 1732–1733	Concerto for 2 harpsichords and orchestra No. 2	C maj.	**2Hc** Str Bc	21^{2}: 39	VII/5: 109	after BWV 1061.1	01246
1061.1	11.	1732–1733 or earlier	Concerto for 2 harpsichords (No. 2)	C maj.	**2Hc**	21^{2}: 39	VII/5: 83	→ BWV 1061.2	01247
1062	11.	1736	Concerto for 2 harpsichords and orchestra No. 3	C min.	**2Hc** Str Bc	21^{2}: 83	VII/5: 43	after BWV 1043	01248
1063	11.	c.1730	Concerto for 3 harpsichords and orchestra No. 1	D min.	**3Hc** Str Bc	31^{3}: 3	VII/6: 3	after unknown model?	01249
1064	11.	c.1730	Concerto for 3 harpsichords and orchestra No. 2	C maj.	**3Hc** Str Bc	31^{3}: 53	VII/6: 55	after BWV 1064R?	01250
1065	11.	c.1730	Concerto for 4 harpsichords and orchestra	A min.	**4Hc** Str Bc	43^{1}: 71	VII/6: 117	after Vivaldi, Op. 3 No. 10	01251
1066	11.	May 1724–End 1725	Orchestral Suite No. 1	C maj.	2Ob Bas Str Bc	31^{1}: 3	VII/1: 3	Ouverture Courante 2Gavotte Forlane 2Minuet 2Bourrée 2Passepied	01252
1067	11.	1738–1739	Orchestral Suite No. 2	B min.	Fl Str Bc	31^{1}: 24	VII/1: 27	Ouverture Rondeau Sarabande 2Bourrée 2Polonaise Minuet Badinerie	01253
1068	11.	c.1730	Orchestral Suite No. 3	D maj.	3Tr Tmp 2Ob (Vl) Str Bc	31^{1}: 40	VII/1: 49, 119	Ouverture Air 2Gavotte Bourrée Gigue	01254
1069	11.	before late 1727	Orchestral Suite No. 4	D maj.	3Tr Tmp 2Ob Bas Str Bc	31^{1}: 66	VII/1: 79	Ouverture 2Bourrée Gavotte 2Minuet Réjouissance; /1 → BWV 110/1	01255
1071								see BWV 1046.1	01229

== Sources ==
- Forkel, Johann Nikolaus; Terry, Charles Sanford (1920). Johann Sebastian Bach: His Life, Art and Work – translated from the German, with notes and appendices. New York: Harcourt, Brace and Howe.
