= Julian Clarkson =

English baritone

Julian Clarkson (born c. 1955) is an English baritone. He is best known for his work with the Monteverdi Choir, singing Bach cantatas. Among his recordings are Weinen, Klagen, Sorgen, Zagen, BWV 12, Ihr werdet weinen und heulen, BWV 103, and Wir müssen durch viel Trübsal, BWV 146. He has also performed with La Chapelle Royale, Les Musiciens du Louvre, the Orchestra of the Age of Enlightenment, Florilegium and has toured with the Amsterdam Baroque Orchestra.
