= Arioso =

Category of classical solo vocal piece

In classical music, arioso ([aˈrjoːzo]; also aria parlante [ˈaːrja parˈlante]) is a category of solo vocal piece, usually occurring in an opera or oratorio, falling somewhere between recitative and aria in style. Literally, arioso means airy. The term arose in the 16th century along with the aforementioned styles and monody. It is commonly confused with recitativo accompagnato.

Arioso is similar to recitative due to its unrestrained structure and inflexions, close to those of speech. It differs, however, in its rhythm. Arioso is similar to aria in its melodic form, both being closer to singing than recitative; however, they differ in form, arioso generally not resorting to the process of repetition.

== Well-known examples ==
At the start of the finale in the first act of Mozart's The Magic Flute, the andante of the priest (Sprecher) "Sobald dich führt der Freundschaft Hand ins Heiligtum zum ew'gen Band" is an example of arioso. "Amor ti vieta", sung by Loris at Giordano's Fedora could be a modern arioso example.

In 1927, Sir Thomas Beecham referred to Frederick Delius's Sea Drift as 'the finest example in all music of the Arioso recitativo.'

== Instrumental arioso ==
Though originally a vocal form, the term arioso was extended to instrumental compositions of the same melodic character, the same way the terms aria and recitative were used in the case of the instrumental aria and instrumental recitative.

One of the most famous instrumental ariosos was composed by Johann Sebastian Bach, and serves as the sinfonia of his cantata, Ich steh mit einem Fuß im Grabe, BWV 156, as well as the middle movement of the Harpsichord Concerto, BWV 1056.

== See also ==
- Cantata – Vocal composition with an instrumental accompaniment
- Oratorio – Large musical composition including an orchestra, a choir, and soloists
