= Ich habe meine Zuversicht, BWV 188 =

Church cantata by Johann Sebastian Bach

Ich habe meine Zuversicht BWV 188
- Church cantata by J. S. Bach
- Performed: 17 October 1728?: Leipzig
- Movements: 6
- Vocal: SATB choir and solo
- Instrumental: 2 oboes; taille; 2 violins; viola; organ; continuo

Ich habe meine Zuversicht (I have [placed] my confidence), BWV 188, is a church cantata by Johann Sebastian Bach. He composed the cantata in Leipzig for the 21st Sunday after Trinity and probably first performed it on 17 October 1728.

== History and text ==
Bach composed this cantata for the 21st Sunday after Trinity. However, the score was "cut to pieces and sold to private individuals" in the 1800s; the work as it now exists is a reconstruction.

The prescribed readings for the day were Ephesians 6:10–17, and John 4:46–54. The text for movements 2 to 5 was written by Picander. The sixth movement is an anonymous chorale, "Auf meinen lieben Gott", written before 1603.

The earliest possible date for the first performance is 17 October 1728, but it could have also been a year later.

== Scoring and structure ==
The work is scored for four solo voices (soprano, alto, tenor, and bass), a four-part choir, two oboes, taille, two violins, viola, organ, and basso continuo.

The piece has six movements:

1. Sinfonia
2. Aria (tenor): Ich habe meine Zuversicht
3. Recitative (bass): Gott meint es gut mit jedermann
4. Aria (alto): Unerforschlich ist die Weise
5. Recitative (soprano): Die Macht der Welt verlieret sich
6. Chorale: Auf meinen lieben Gott

== Music ==
The opening sinfonia for solo organ and orchestra derives from the third movement of Bach's keyboard concerto in D minor, BWV 1052.

The tenor aria has been compared to movements from both the French Suites and the Fifth English Suite. It opens with a string ritornello doubled by oboe; the two parts move into counterpoint after the tenor enters. Formally, the movement has an extended two-part A section before moving to a B section remarkable for its emphasis on instrumental arpeggiation.

The bass recitative is secco and concludes with a pastoral arioso.

The alto aria is "dark and dramatic", in E minor with cello and organ obbligato. The organ line is complex, contributing to a movement that is "a complex and ever-changing kaleidoscope of richly entwined rhythms and melodies".

The soprano recitative is short and accompanied by chordal strings. The final movement is a four-part setting of the chorale tune, doubled by oboe, taille, and strings.

== Recordings ==
- Gächinger Kantorei / Württembergisches Kammerorchester Heilbronn, Helmuth Rilling. Die Bach Kantate. Hänssler, 1983.
- Holland Boys Choir / Netherlands Bach Collegium, Pieter Jan Leusink. Bach Edition Vol. 5. Brilliant Classics, 1999.
- Monteverdi Choir / English Baroque Soloists, John Eliot Gardiner. Bach Cantatas Vol. 11. Soli Deo Gloria, recorded 2000.
- Amsterdam Baroque Orchestra & Choir, Ton Koopman. J.S. Bach: Complete Cantatas Vol. 19. Antoine Marchand, 2003.
- Bach Collegium Japan, Masaaki Suzuki. J. S. Bach: Cantatas Vol. 49. BIS, 2010.
