= Violin Concerto in A minor (Bach) =

Violin concerto by Johann Sebastian Bach

- BWV 1041
- by J. S. Bach
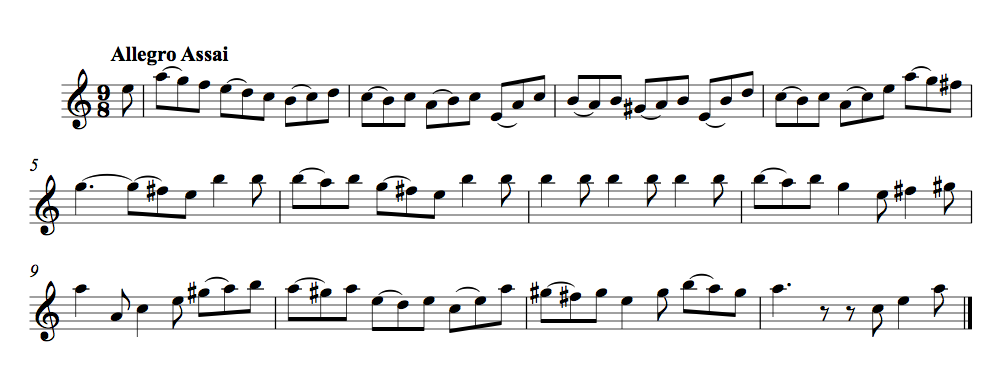
- The first twelve bars of the third movement
- Composed: 1717–1723
- Duration: 15 minutes
- Movements: 3
- Instrumental: Violin; strings; continuo

Recordings
- I. Allegro moderato (U.S. Marine Band): file; help
- II. Andante (U.S. Marine Band): file; help
- III. Allegro assai (U.S. Marine Band): file; help

The Violin Concerto in A minor, BWV 1041, is a violin concerto by Johann Sebastian Bach. It shows the influence of Italian composers such as Bach's older contemporary Vivaldi.

Bach is known to have studied Vivaldi's music from around 1714 when he was working at Weimar. Italian influence can be seen in keyboard music he composed around that time. However, the date of the concerto is the subject of dispute as the original score has not survived. It could have been written at any of three locations:

- Weimar. Most scholars think it was written after Bach left Weimar in 1717 (the violinist Lina Tur Bonet, who suggests it was written there, adheres to the minority position).
- Köthen. It is "generally thought to have been composed at Köthen". Bach worked at the court there in the period 1717–23 and his duties included directing a small orchestra.
- Leipzig. It could have been written at Leipzig, as the only autograph source to survive is a set of parts Bach copied out (along with Carl Philipp Emanuel Bach, Johann Ludwig Krebs, and an unknown copyist) in Leipzig c. 1730 from a now lost score or draft. Christoph Wolff has argued that the work may have been written during Bach's time as director of Leipzig's Collegium Musicum. John Butt takes a similar view, suggesting that Bach wrote it "probably soon after taking over the Leipzig Collegium Musicum in 1729".

== Structure and analysis ==
The piece has three movements:

1. Allegro molto moderato, in A minor, 2/4 meter;
  The opening movement is in ritornello form. This means that there is a main section that comes back in fragments in both the solo violin and orchestral parts. This 'ritornello' can be found in the first movement up until bar 24. The motifs of the theme appear in changing combinations and are separated and intensified throughout the movement.
2. Andante con moto, in C major, meter;
  In the Andante second movement, Bach uses an insistent pattern in the ostinato bass part that is repeated constantly in the movement. He focuses the variation in the harmonic relations. Butt notes that "Bach seems to have associated" the ostinato scheme "particularly with violin concertos.".
3. Allegro assai, in A minor, 9/8 meter.
  In the final movement Bach relies on bariolage figures to generate striking acoustic effects. The meter and rhythm are those of a gigue. Butt describes it as "perhaps Bach's most animated and carefree movement in the minor mode."

A typical performance of the concerto takes around 15 minutes.

== Publication ==
The concerto was published for the first time in 1852. In the 1870s Wilhelm Rust edited it for publication in the first complete edition of Bach's works.

== Instrumentations and transcriptions ==
The Keyboard Concerto in G minor, BWV 1058 is an arrangement of this concerto with harpsichord.
