= Ich steh mit einem Fuß im Grabe, BWV 156 =

Church cantata by Johann Sebastian Bach

Ich steh mit einem Fuß im Grabe
- BWV 156
- Church cantata by J. S. Bach
- Occasion: Third Sunday after Epiphany
- Cantata text: Picander
- Chorale: "Machs mit mir, Gott, nach deiner Güt" by Johann Herman Schein; "Herr, wie du willt, so schicks mit mir" by Kaspar Bienemann
- Performed: 1727 or 1729: Leipzig
- Vocal: SATB choir, alto, tenor, and bass solo
- Instrumental: oboe; 2 violins; viola; basso continuo

Ich steh mit einem Fuß im Grabe (I stand with one foot in the grave), BWV 156, (Note: "BWV" is Bach-Werke-Verzeichnis, a thematic catalogue of Bach's works.) is a church cantata by Johann Sebastian Bach. He composed it in Leipzig for the third Sunday after Epiphany and first performed it in 1727 or 1729. The cantata is well known for its opening sinfonia for orchestra and oboe solo.

== History and text ==
BWV 156 was Bach's fourth and last cantata for the Third Sunday after Epiphany. The prescribed readings for the Sunday were taken from the Epistle to the Romans, rules for life (Romans 12:17–21), and from the Gospel of Matthew, the healing of a leper (Matthew 8:1–13). The librettist was Picander. He incorporated two chorale tunes: "Machs mit mir, Gott, nach deiner Güt" by Johann Hermann Schein (1628) and "Herr, wie du willt, so schicks mit mir" by Kaspar Bienemann (1582).

The sinfonia was likely derived from an earlier oboe concerto and was later adapted as part of Bach's Harpsichord Concerto in F minor, BWV 1056.

The earliest possible date for the first performance is 26 January 1727. 23 January 1729 is another possibility.

== Scoring and structure ==
The work is scored for three vocal soloists (alto, tenor, and bass), four-part choir, oboe, two violins, viola, and basso continuo.

It has six movements:

1. Sinfonia
2. Chorale (soprano) and aria (tenor): Ich steh mit einem Fuß im Grabe
3. Recitative (bass): Mein Angst und Not
4. Aria (alto): Herr, was du willt, soll mir gefallen
5. Recitative (bass): Und willst du, dass ich nicht soll kranken
6. Chorale: Herr, wie du willt, so schicks mit mir

== Music ==
Sinfonia
Arranged for violin and piano, featuring Carrie Rehkopf (violin)

The opening sinfonia is scored for oboe, strings, and continuo. It is in F major and common time. Compared to the later version for harpsichord, the melody is straightforward and unembellished, and is harmonically conceived to prepare the second movement.

The second movement is a combined tenor aria and soprano chorale with obbligato strings. Unusually, it begins with a syncopated continuo line under unison strings. The movement also features sequences and harmonic contrasts.

Both bass recitatives are secco and in minor mode. The first, the third movement of the cantata, is characterized by a disjunct melodic line and a concluding arioso line. The second, the fifth movement, is comparatively "lighter in mood and spirit". It anticipates the melody of the final chorale setting.

The alto aria is accompanied by oboe and violin in parallel thirds and sixths. The movement includes several instances of word painting. Formally, the movement is an altered da capo aria. It has a "generally sunny affect ... only momentarily disturbed by more charged harmonies".

The final movement is a four-part setting of the chorale in C major. The phrase lengths are varied to provide a "hint of timelessness".

== Recordings ==
- American Bach Soloists, Jeffrey Thomas. J. S. Bach: Cantatas Volume II. Koch International Classics, 1992.
- Amsterdam Baroque Orchestra & Choir, Ton Koopman. J. S. Bach: Complete Cantatas Vol. 20. Antoine Marchand, 2003.
- Bach Collegium Japan, Masaaki Suzuki. J. S. Bach: Cantatas Vol. 49. BIS, 2010.
- Figuralchor der Gedächtniskirche Stuttgart / Bach-Collegium Stuttgart, Helmuth Rilling. Die Bach Kantate. Hänssler, 1973.
- Holland Boys Choir / Netherlands Bach Collegium, Pieter Jan Leusink. Bach Edition Vol. 11. Brilliant Classics, 1999.
- Monteverdi Choir / English Baroque Soloists, John Eliot Gardiner. J. S. Bach: Cantatas for the 3rd Sunday of Epiphany. Archiv Produktion, 2000.
