= Wir müssen durch viel Trübsal, BWV 146 =

Cantata by Johann Sebastian Bach

Wir müssen durch viel Trübsal
- BWV 146
- Church cantata by J. S. Bach
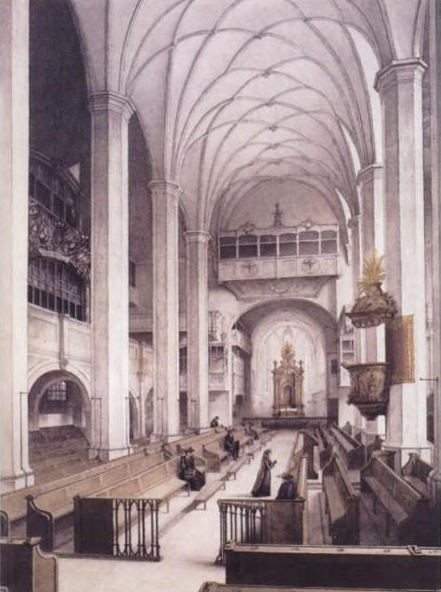
- Thomaskirche, Leipzig
- Occasion: Jubilate
- Bible text: Acts 14:22
- Composed: 1726 or 1727
- Movements: 8
- Vocal: SATB choir and solo
- Instrumental: flauto traverso; 2 oboes d'amore; taille; organ; 2 violins; viola; continuo

Wir müssen durch viel Trübsal (We must [pass] through great sadness), BWV 146, is a cantata by Johann Sebastian Bach, a church cantata for the third Sunday after Easter. Bach composed it in Leipzig in 1726 or 1727.

== History and words ==
Bach composed the cantata in Leipzig for the Third Sunday after Easter, called Jubilate. The prescribed readings for the Sunday were from the First Epistle of Peter, "Submit yourselves to every ordinance of man" (1 Peter 2:11–20), and from the Gospel of John, Jesus announcing his second coming in his Farewell Discourse (John 16:16–23). Bach contrasted sorrow and joy in earlier cantatas for the same occasion, first in Weimar in 1714, Weinen, Klagen, Sorgen, Zagen, BWV 12, then in Leipzig in 1725, Ihr werdet weinen und heulen, BWV 103. The unknown poet chose a quote from Acts 14:22 to begin the cantata, "We must through much tribulation enter into the kingdom of God", which Salomon Franck had already used for the first recitative of Weinen, Klagen, Sorgen, Zagen. The three following movements deplore the sufferings in the world, whereas three more movements depict the joyful hope for a better life in the Kingdom of God. The theme throughout his texts is a longing for death. Movement 5 is a paraphrase of Psalms 126:5–20, which Brahms also chose for his Requiem, "They that sow in tears shall reap in joy". Movement 6 refers to Romans 8:18, "For I reckon that the sufferings of this present time are not worthy to be compared with the glory which shall be revealed in us". Only the music but not the words of the closing chorale is extant. The ninth stanza of Gregorius Richter's hymn "Lasset ab von euren Tränen" has been suggested by Alfred Dürr as a possible text for this closing chorale. Klaus Hofmann suggested "Freu dich sehr, o meine Seele" by Christoph Demantius.

The earliest possible date for the first performance is 12 May 1726. 4 May 1727 is another possibility.

== Scoring and structure ==
The cantata in eight movements is scored for soprano, alto, tenor and bass soloists, a four-part choir, flauto traverso, two oboes d'amore, taille (tenor oboe), organ, two violins, viola and basso continuo.

1. Sinfonia
2. Chorus: Wir müssen durch viel Trübsal in das Reich Gottes eingehen
3. Aria (alto): Ich will nach dem Himmel zu
4. Recitative (soprano): Ach! wer doch schon im Himmel wär!
5. Aria (soprano): Ich säe meine Zähren
6. Recitative (tenor): Ich bin bereit, mein Kreuz geduldig zu ertragen
7. Aria (tenor, bass): Wie will ich mich freuen, wie will ich mich laben
8. Chorale: Denn wer selig dahin fähret or Freu dich sehr, o meine Seele

== Music ==
Two movements of the cantata, the Sinfonia and the first movement, are related to Bach's Harpsichord Concerto in D minor, BWV 1052, which was possibly derived from a lost violin concerto. The original music for the cantata is also lost, but scholars are convinced that it is a work of Bach. He used an instrumental concerto in a similar way for movements of his cantatas Gott soll allein mein Herze haben, BWV 169, and Ich geh und suche mit Verlangen, BWV 49, where his authorship is beyond doubt.

Bach reworked the first movement of the harpsichord concerto to an organ concerto, expanding the strings by woodwind instruments. He changed the second movement to a choral movement by embedding vocal parts in the music, but this time without additional woodwinds. Brian Robins commented:

The opening chorus is superimposed onto the deeply moving slow movement of the concerto, the anguish of the repeated (ostinato) bass line ideally underlining a text concerned with the tribulation that must be endured before the kingdom of heaven is attained.

Musicologist Julian Mincham describes the process of changing a harpsichord concerto movement to a chorus with obbligato organ in detail:

The original thirteen-bar throbbing ritornello theme is retained but its function has changed. The voices soar above it from the very first bar and continue to enhance it throughout its six appearances in different tonal environments. The ritornello theme has virtually become a free "ground bass" throughout. The tortuous melodic line, the main focus of attention in the concerto setting, has now become an obbligato melody of secondary significance. It is played by the organ, the first time Bach has used the instrument in this way in a chorus. The choir rises magnificently above everything else establishing itself as the dominant musical force, even appearing to disregard the phrasing of the original composition. All that was of primary importance in the concerto is now secondary to the chorus and its message. This momentous adagio, seemingly complete in its version for strings and harpsichord, has taken on a whole new dimension of musical meaning.

Hofmann summarizes: "Filled with lamenting in the spirit of the Passion, the movement gains its intensity from the dense and dissonant harmonic expressiveness, and incorporates ostinato phrases whose regular appearances seem to illustrate inevitability."

The third movement is an alto aria with violin obbligato, which transcends "dem Himmel zu" (towards Heaven). The following recitative, a lament on the persecution in the world, is accompanied by long chords in the strings. Movement 5 illustrates in two sections the opposition of sowing with tears and reaping with joy, accompanied by a flute and two oboes d'amore. Movement 7 is probably derived from a secular dance-like movement in da capo form. A ritornello frames the first section, continuo only accompanies the middle section. The final chorale is set for four parts on the melody of "Werde munter, mein Gemüte".

== Recordings ==
- Die Bach Kantate Vol. 33, Helmuth Rilling, Gächinger Kantorei, Bach-Collegium Stuttgart, Helen Donath, Marga Höffgen, Kurt Equiluz, Hanns-Friedrich Kunz, Hänssler 1973
- J. S. Bach: Das Kantatenwerk – Sacred Cantatas Vol. 6, Nikolaus Harnoncourt, Tölzer Knabenchor, Concentus Musicus Wien, soloist of the Tölzer Knabenchor, Paul Esswood, Kurt Equiluz, Thomas Hampson, Teldec 1980
- Bach Cantatas Vol. 24: Altenburg/Warwick, John Eliot Gardiner, Monteverdi Choir, English Baroque Soloists, Brigitte Geller, William Towers, Mark Padmore, Julian Clarkson, Soli Deo Gloria 2000
- Bach Edition Vol. IV–16, Pieter Jan Leusink, Holland Boys Choir, Nethertlands Bach Collegium, Marjon Strijk, Sytse Buwalda, Marcel Beekman, Bas Ramselaar, Brilliant Records, 2000
- J. S. Bach: Complete Cantatas Vol. 15 – Sibylla Rubens, Bogna Bartosz, James Gilchrist, Klaus Mertens, Amsterdam Baroque Orchestra & Choir, Ton Koopman, Antoine Marchand 2001
- J. S. Bach: Cantatas Vol. 19 (Cantatas from Leipzig 1724), Masaaki Suzuki, Bach Collegium Japan, Rachel Nicholls, Robin Blaze, Gerd Türk, Peter Kooy, BIS 2008

== Sources ==
- Wir müssen durch viel Trübsal, BWV 146: Scores at the International Music Score Library Project
- "Wir müssen durch viel Trübsal BWV 146; BC A 70 / Sacred cantata (4th Sunday of Easter)" Bach Digital
- "Cantata BWV 146 Wir müssen durch viel Trübsal in das Reich Gottes eingehen, history, scoring, sources for text and music, translations to various languages, discography, discussion, Bach Cantatas website
- "BWV 146 Wir müssen durch viel Trübsal", English translation, University of Vermont
- "BWV 146 Wir müssen durch viel Trübsal, text, scoring, University of Alberta
- Gardiner, John Eliot (2005). Johann Sebastian Bach (1685-1750) / Cantatas Nos 12, 103, 108, 117, 146 & 166 (Media notes). Soli Deo Gloria (at Hyperion Records website).
