= Werner Breig =

German musicologist (1932–2026)

Werner Breig (29 June 1932 – 25 August 2026) was a German musicologist and music publisher. His research specialized in Baroque and Classical music, particular that of Johann Sebastian Bach and Heinrich Schütz.

== Life ==
Born in Zwickau, Breig studied Protestant sacred music at the Spandauer Kirchenmusikschule from 1950 and musicology, art history and library science at the universities University of Erlangen–Nuremberg and Hamburg from 1955. In 1962 he received his doctorate as D. Phil. at the University of Erlangen-Nuremberg with a dissertation on Heinrich Scheidemann. He worked as research assistant at the musicological seminar of the University of Freiburg and received a scholarship from the German Research Foundation for further studies. In 1973 he received his habilitation in Freiburg im Breisgau. In 1974 he became professor for musicology at the Hochschule für Musik Karlsruhe and director of the musicological institute of the Karlsruhe Institute of Technology. In 1979 he became professor for musicology at the University of Wuppertal. From 1988 until his Emeriterus in 1997, he held the chair of musicology at the Ruhr University Bochum.

His work focuses on the analysis and edition of compositions of the 17th and 18th centuries, including Johann Sebastian Bach and especially Heinrich Schütz. He founded the Schütz-Jahrbuch.

Breig died on 25 August 2026, aged 94.

== Publications ==
- Die Orgelwerke von Heinrich Scheidemann. Franz Steiner, Wiesbaden 1967.
- with Werner Schulz: Richard Wagner und Karlsruhe. Braun, Karlsruhe 1987.
- Bachs Orchesterwerke. Klangfarben-Musikverlag, Witten 1997.
- Schütz-Gesamtausgaben. In Reinmar Emans, Ulrich Krämer (edit): Musikeditionen im Wandel der Geschichte. de Gruyter, Berlin 2015, ISBN 978-3-11-044090-4, pp. 97–125.

as publisher:

- Opernkomposition als Prozess. Bärenreiter, Kassel 1996.
- Johann Sebastian Bach: Sämtliche Orgelwerke. Breitkopf & Härtel, Wiesbanden 2013
