= Sinfonia =

Type of 17th- or 18th-century orchestral piece

Sinfonia (IPA: [siɱfoˈniːa]; plural sinfonie) is the Italian word for symphony, from the Latin symphonia, in turn derived from Ancient Greek συμφωνία symphōnia (agreement or concord of sound), from the prefix σύν (together) and Φωνή (sound). In English it most commonly refers to a 17th- or 18th-century orchestral piece used as an introduction, interlude, or postlude to an opera, oratorio, cantata, or suite. The word is also found in other Romance languages such as Spanish or Portuguese. In the Middle Ages down to as late as 1588, it was also the Italian name for the hurdy-gurdy.

Johann Sebastian Bach used the term for his keyboard compositions also known as Three-part Inventions, and after about 1800, the term, when in reference to opera, meant "overture". Sinfonia in D major, BWV 1045 is considered to belong to a lost cantata, because its manuscript indicates that the piece had four vocal parts.

The instrumental overture to George Frideric Handel's oratorio Messiah, HWV 56, modeled on the French overture, was originally titled "Sinfony" in Händel's autograph score.

Two examples of contemporary use, long after the classical era, include Igor Stravinsky's neoclassical Octet composed in 1923, the first movement of which he titled "Sinfonia", and Benjamin Britten's requiem mass composed in 1940, titled Sinfonia da Requiem.

In the 20th and 21st centuries it is found in the names of some chamber orchestras, often pronounced with stress on the second syllable (IPA: [siɱˈfoniːa]), such as the Northern Sinfonia.

== Sinfonias in the vocal works by Johann Sebastian Bach ==
Work	Movement	Related instrumental work	Movement
Christ lag in Todes Banden, BWV 4	1		
Weinen, Klagen, Sorgen, Zagen, BWV 12	1		
Gleichwie der Regen und Schnee vom Himmel fällt, BWV 18	1		
Ich hatte viel Bekümmernis, BWV 21	1		
Wir danken dir, Gott, wir danken dir, BWV 29	1	Partita for Violin No. 3 in E major, BWV 1006	1
Geist und Seele wird verwirret, BWV 35	1	Concerto in D minor (fragment), BWV 1059	
Geist und Seele wird verwirret, BWV 35	5	Probably the same lost work as BWV 35/1	
Am Abend aber desselbigen Sabbats, BWV 42	1		
Ich geh und suche mit Verlangen, BWV 49	1	Keyboard Concerto No. 2 in E major, BWV 1053	1, 3
Falsche Welt, dir trau ich nicht, BWV 52	1	Sinfonia in F major (early version of Brandenburg Concerto No. 1), BWV 1046a	1
Die Elenden sollen essen, BWV 75	8		
Die Himmel erzählen die Ehre Gottes, BWV 76	8	Organ Sonata No. 4 in E minor, BWV 528	1
Herr Gott, Beherrscher aller Dinge, BWV 120a	4	Partita for Violin No. 3 in E major, BWV 1006	1
Wir müssen durch viel Trübsal, BWV 146	1	Keyboard Concerto No. 1 in D minor, BWV 1052	1
Nach dir, Herr, verlanget mich, BWV 150	1		
Tritt auf die Glaubensbahn, BWV 152	1		
Ich steh mit einem Fuß im Grabe, BWV 156	1	Keyboard Concerto No. 5 in F minor, BWV 1056	2
Gott soll allein mein Herze haben, BWV 169	1	Keyboard Concerto No. 2 in E major, BWV 1053	1
Ich liebe den Höchsten von ganzem Gemüte, BWV 174	1	Brandenburg Concerto No. 3 in G major, BWV 1048	1
Ich habe meine Zuversicht, BWV 188	1	Keyboard Concerto No. 1 in D minor, BWV 1052	3
Der Herr denket an uns, BWV 196	1		
Non sa che sia dolore, BWV 209	1		
St John Passion (third version), BWV 245.3	33 (lost)		
Christmas Oratorio part 2, BWV 248 II	1		
Easter Oratorio, BWV 249; Entfliehet, verschwindet, entweichet, ihr Sorgen, BWV 249a	1		

== See also ==
- Sinfonia concertante
- Sinfonietta (symphony)
- Phi Mu Alpha Sinfonia
- Overture
