= Stéphanie Paulet =

French musician

Stéphanie Paulet is a French classical violinist and musician.

== Biography ==
Originally from the region Rhône-Alpes, Paulet entered the Conservatoire de Paris, and obtained three first prizes for her mastery of the violin.

== Career ==
For nearly ten years, in trios or with orchestras under the direction of Claudio Abbado, Bernard Haitink and Philippe Herreweghe, she performed as the first violin of Parisian Baroque ensembles such as Le Concert d'Astrée, Il Seminario Musicale and Les Talens Lyriques. Since November 2012, Stéphanie Paulet is the concert master of the Insula Orchestra conducted by Laurence Equilbey, a musical training specialized in the practice of historical instruments.

The same year, the musician founded the ensemble "Aliquando". She has previously been a member of various chamber ensembles, including the ensemble "Il Convito" alongside the musicians Maude Gratton and Claire Gratton, with whom she performed, notably in America. Paulet combines her creations with a historical reflection around the Baroque and classical musics repertoires. A first project V. de Velours ou la Leçon de Musique in partnership with the Royaumont Foundation, was presented in Dardilly in June 2012. From theatre to classical music, the show explored the possible links between works for solo violin and the texts of Denis Diderot.

The formation produced two recordings Amusements (2012) dedicated to the French composer Louis-Gabriel Guillemain and Minoritenkonvent (2015). For this second project, she joined the organist Elisabeth Geiger to give life to the manuscript XIV 726 still little explored by musicians. This set of 17th century sonatas was found in the Minorite Convent in Vienna

In 2014, she was named a Chevalier des Arts et des Lettres.

In 2015, associated with the Japanese organist Yasuko Uyama-Bouvard, she proposed a reinterpretation of Wolfgang Amadeus Mozart's sonatas.

Paulet is a violin teacher at the Conservatoire à rayonnement régional de Saint-Maur-des-Fossés. She previously taught at the Hochschule Bremen for five years.

== Discography ==
=== Aliquando ===
- 2012: Amusements by Louis-Gabriel Guillemain, Aliquando, Muso, (Harmonia Mundi)
- 2015: Minoritenkonvent by Heinrich Ignaz Franz Biber, Giovanni Buonaventura Viviani, Jan Ignác František Vojta and Nikolaus Faber with Elisabeth Geiger and Stéphanie Paulet, Aliquando, (Off the Record)

=== Collaborations ===
- 2015: Sonates pour pianoforte avec l'accompagnement d'un violon by Wolfgang Amadeus Mozart by Stéphanie Paulet and Yasuko Uyama-Bouvard, (Hortus)

== Distinctions ==
- 2014: Chevalier des Arts et des Lettres
