= Maude Gratton =

French classical musician (born 1983)

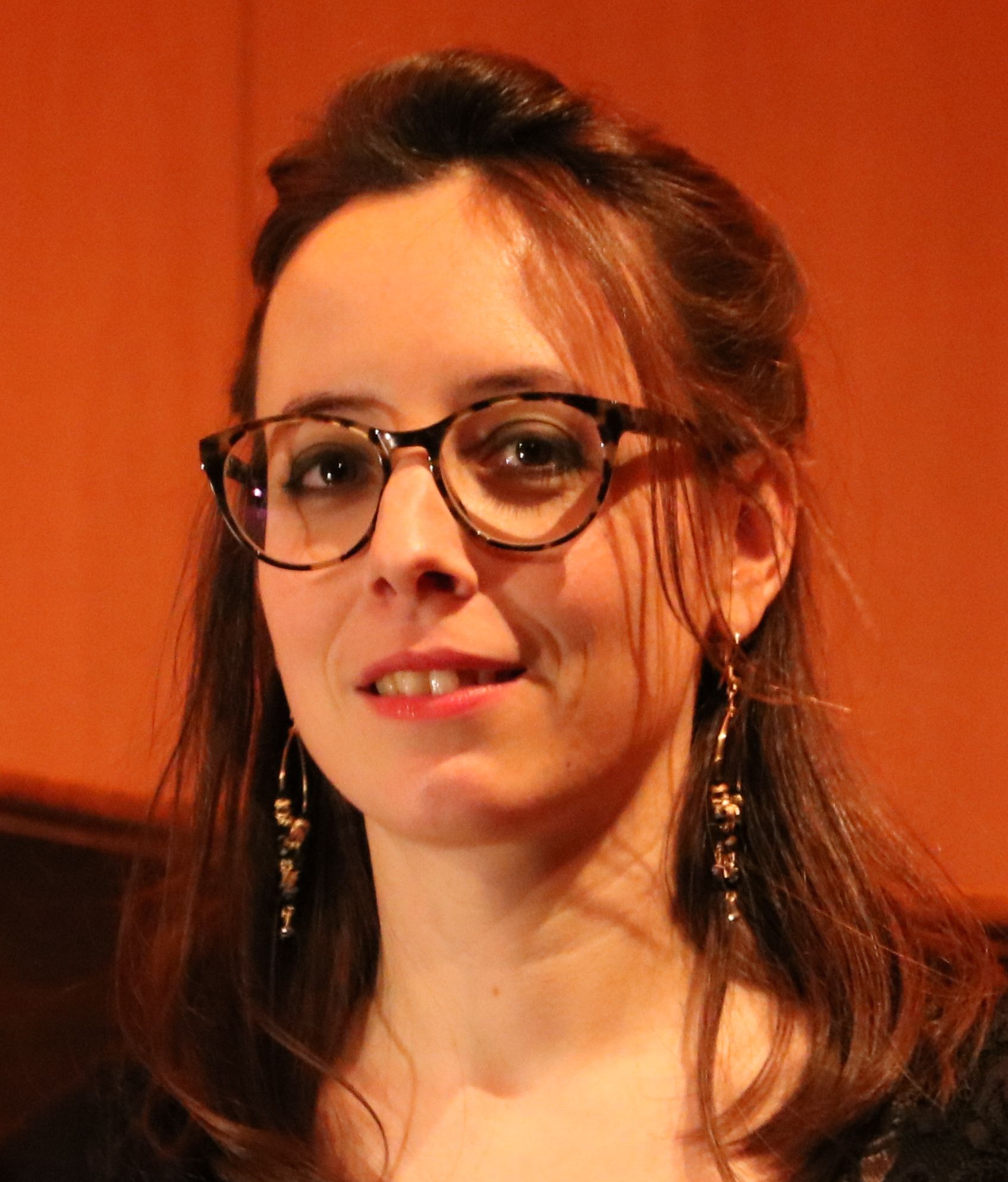
Maude Gratton

Maude Gratton (born 1983) is a French classical musician. She is pursuing a career of soloist, mastering the pipe organ, the piano-forte and the harpsichord.

== Biography ==
Born in Niort, Gratton studied the harpsichord and the organ at the Conservatoire de Poitiers in the class of organist Dominique Ferran.

She graduated from the Conservatoire de Paris in harpsichord, organ, basso continuo and Renaissance counterpoint. In 2003, she distinguished herself with the 2nd prize of the Organ Competition of the MAfestival Brugge and was promoted Young Soloist of the Public Francophone Radios in 2006.

=== Solo career ===
In 2009, Gratton recorded her first solo project devoted to the works of Wilhelm Friedemann Bach. The album was distinguished by the Gramophone's Choice and awarded a Golden Diapason in 2009. Since then she has recorded about ten albums as soloist or through different ensembles of Baroque and chamber music.

Gratton collaborates with operatic soprano Camille Poul.

She is a member of the Collegium Vocale Gent choir, under the direction of conductor Philippe Herreweghe, established in 1970 at Ghent (Belgium).

In 2011, she founded the "Académie de musique de Saint-Loup" then in 2012 became the artistic director of the Festival Musiques en Gâtine in the Poitou-Charentes region, renamed the MM Festival in 2017.

Gratton is part of the teaching staff of the Vannes Early Music Institute (VEMI), the European Academy of classical music of Vannes, headed by French cellist Bruno Cocset.

=== Il Convito Ensemble ===
In 2005, Gratton was at the initiative of the band Il Convito, alongside the musicians Claire Gratton and Stéphanie Paulet. The chamber music ensemble was the 2007 winner of the "Déclic" program supported by Culturesfrance (current Institut français since 2010) and Radio France.

Her repertoire includes both music from the Renaissance music and works from the 19th century, performed on period instruments. "Il Convito" is invited to perform in several festivals including the "Journées musicales d'automne" of Souvigny, La Folle Journée of Nantes and the Bach Académie in Bruges. The musicians have also participated in several tours abroad.

In 2015, the ensemble released its first album dedicated to Concertos for harpsichord and strings by Wilhelm Friedemann Bach at Mirare.

In May 2016, Gratton created "An Evening with Mozart", her first project for an orchestra of "Il Convito", around the work of Wolfgang Amadeus Mozart.

== Discography ==
- Wilhelm Friedemann Bach, Maude Gratton, Mirare (2009)
- Martín Matalon, Trame II for harpsichord and six instruments, conducted by François-Xavier Roth, with the participation of Maude Gratton, Actes Sud (2010)
- Louis-Gabriel Guillemain, Sonatas for violin and continuo, Sonata for violin and obbligato harpsichord, conducted by Stéphanie Paulet, Ensemble Aliquando, with the participation of Maude Gratton, Muso (2012)
- Johann Sebastian Bach, Cantatas for viola and obbligato organ, works for organ, "Le Banquet céleste", conducting by Damien Guillon, with the participation of Maude Gratton, Zig-Zag Territoires (2012)
- George Onslow, Sonatas for Cello and Piano Op. 16, Maude Gratton and Emmanuel Jacques, Mirare (2012)
- Biber Imitatio, Ricercar Consort, Philippe Pierlot and Maude Gratton, Mirare (2014)
- Antonio Vivaldi, Concertos for cello(s), concerto for violin and organ, "Les Basses Réunies", conducted by Bruno Cocset, with the participation of Maude Gratton, Agogique (2014)
- Il Concerto, Concertos for Harpsichord and Strings, conducting by Maude Gratton, Mirare (2015)
- Bach's The Musical Offering, conducted by Philippe Pierlot, François Fernandez and Marc Hantaï, with the participation of Maude Gratton, Mirare (2015)
- Bach, Leipzig Organ Works (1723-1750), Phi – Outhere music (2016).
- Beethoven's Quintet for Piano and Winds, Edding Quartet & Northernlight, with the participation of Maude Gratton, Phi – Outhere music (2016).

== Awards ==
- 1st Prize at the Concours des jeunes organistes de Saint-Germain-des-Fossés, France (2000)
- 2nd prize at the Bruges International Organ Competition, Belgium (2003)
- Youn Soloist of the Radios francophones publiques, France (2006)
- Golden Diapason, Album, Wilhelm Friedemann Bach, Maude Gratton, Mirare, France (2009)
- Golden Diapason, Album, Biber Imitatio, Ricercar Consort, Philippe Pierlot and Maude Gratton, Mirare, France (2014)
