= Camille Poul =

French operatic soprano

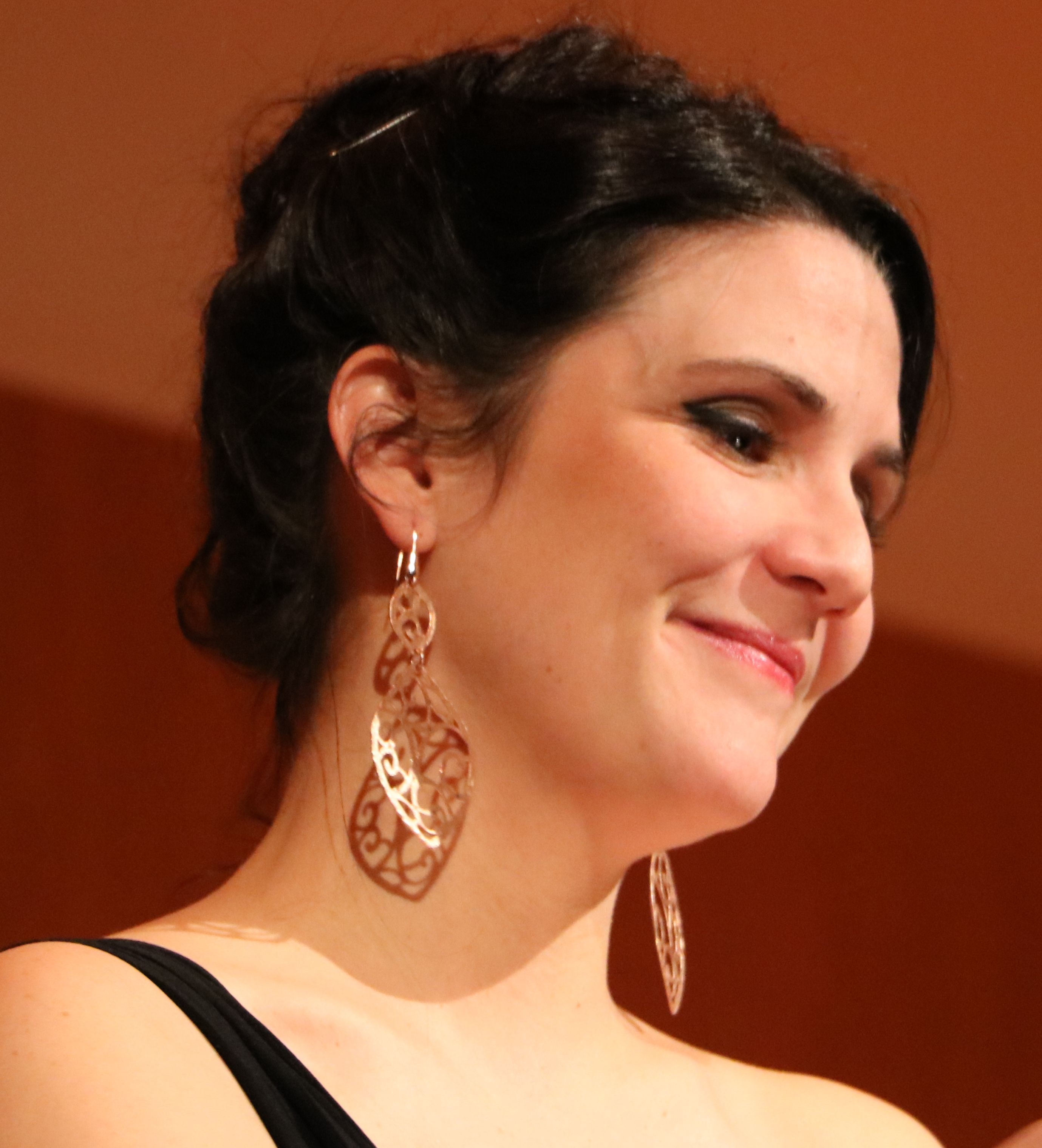
- Poul at La Folle Journée 2017, in Nantes

Background information
- Born: 1982 (age 43–44)
- Origin: France
- Genres: Opera
- Occupation: Soprano
- Website: www.camillepoul.com

Camille Poul (born 1982) is a French operatic soprano.

== Education ==
Poul is a graduate of the Conservatoire de Région of Paris for the Baroque repertoire and of the Conservatoire de Région of Caen. She continued her studies at the Conservatoire de Paris for the lyrical repertoire.

== Career ==
Poul is a trained flutist. Very early, Poul sang as a soloist in the Seine Maritime master's program in Rouen.

In 2013, she doubled the title role of Hippolyte et Aricie at the Glyndebourne Festival Opera. She began her career as a soloist with the ensemble "Les Musiciens du Paradis", conducted by Alain Buet.

Camille Poul performs in duet with Jean-Paul Pruna and Célimène Daudet as pianist, or with Maude Gratton and François Guerrier as harpsichordist and fortepianist.

She performs under the direction of conductors such as Emmanuelle Haïm, William Christie, René Jacobs, Jean-Christophe Spinosi, Stéphane Denève, Giuseppe Grazzioli, Gerard Korsten, David Reiland, Damien Guillon, Vincent Dumestre, Jean-Claude Malgoire and David Stern.

== Discography ==
- L'Enfant et les Sortilèges, SWR de Stuttgart directed by Stéphane Denève (Brilliant Classics)
- La Première Dame in Les Mystères d'Isis pastiche version of The Magic Flute (by Lachnitt-Mozart), label Glossa
- Urgande in Lully's Amadis (label Musiques à la Chabotterie),
- la Deuxième Grâce in Belli's Orfeo (label Alpha), title-role of Caldara's Maddalena ai piedi di Cristo
- Michel de la Barre (La Julie, label Agogique)
- L'incoronazione di Poppea (Virgin Classics) and Amour and Palès in Lulli's Cadmus et Hermione (label Alpha).
- Joseph Bodin de Boismortier - Don Quichotte chez la Duchesse (label Chateau de Versailles Spectacles)
