= Il Seminario Musicale =

Baroque music ensemble

Il Seminario Musicale is a baroque music ensemble founded in 1985 by the French countertenor Gérard Lesne, who is also its artistic director. Since 1990, the group has been resident of the Fondation de l'abbaye de Royaumont, thirty kilometres north of Paris. Their repertoire centers around 17th- and 18th-century Italian and French music, including that of Monteverdi, Cavalli, Vivaldi, Couperin and Charpentier.

Past and current members of the ensemble include Marc Minkowski, Fabio Biondi, Blandine Rannou, Bruno Cocset, Patrick Cohën-Akenine, Florence Malgoire, Benjamin Perrot, Anne-Marie Lasla and Violaine Cochard. Il Seminario Musicale has released almost 30 recordings with EMI-Virgin Classics and Naïve. Amongst the prizes they have received are the French "Diapason d'or" and the "Victoires de la Musique". The ensemble is supported by French Ministry of Culture and Communication, DRAC Ile-de-France, and the Conseil Général du Val d’Oise.
