= Sinfonia in D major, BWV 1045 =

Orchestral work by J. S. Bach

Sinfonia in D major
- by Johann Sebastian Bach
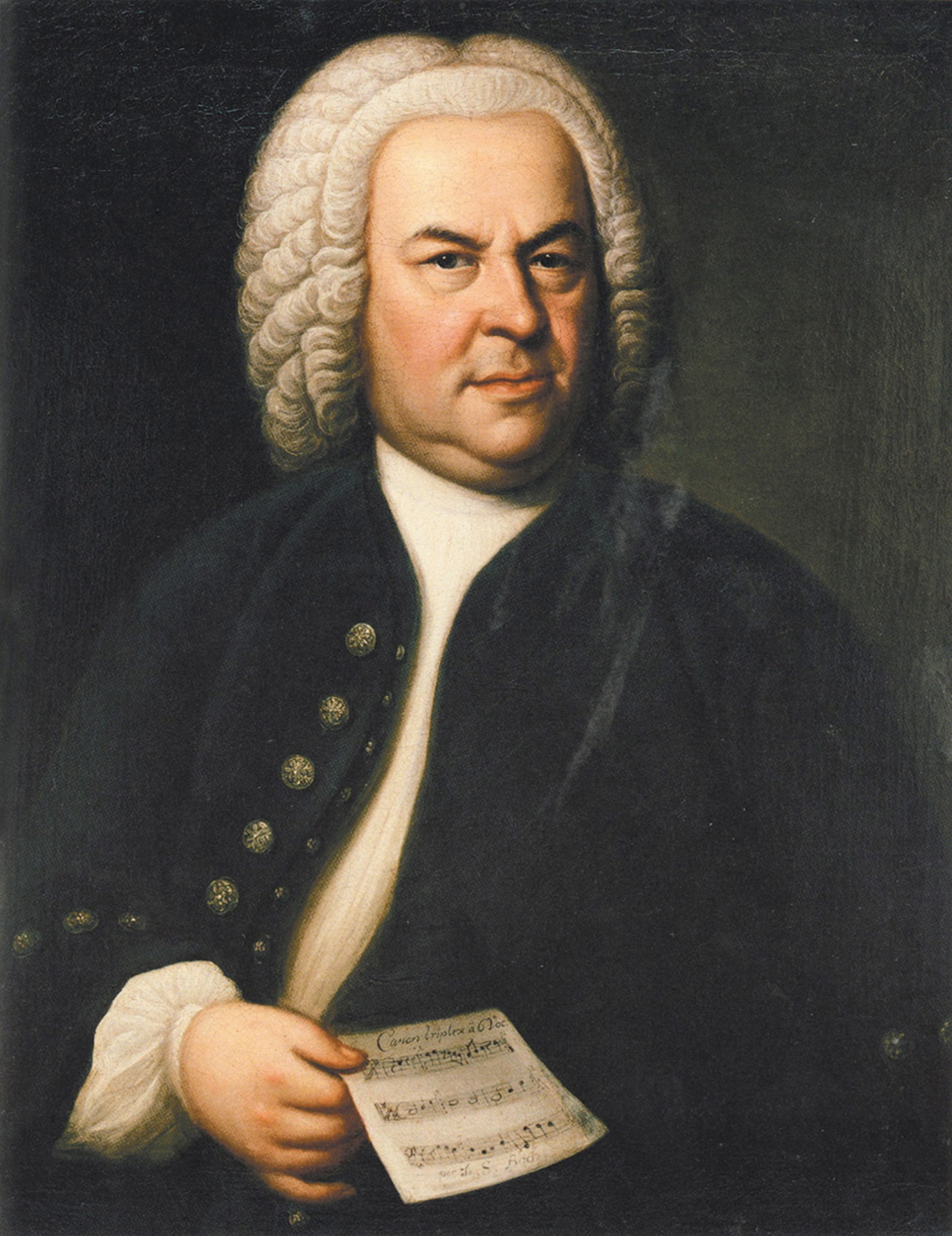
- Key: D major
- Catalogue: BWV 1045
- Year: 1746
- Period: Baroque
- Genre: Concerto/Sinfonia
- Composed: 1742–1746
- Movements: 1
- Scoring: Violin, 3 Trumpets, Timpani, 2 Oboes Strings, and Continuo

Sinfonia in D major, BWV 1045, sometimes referred to as a violin concerto movement (Konzertsatz), is an orchestral work for solo violin, three trumpets, timpani, two oboes, strings and continuo, by Johann Sebastian Bach. A late work composed in Leipzig between c. 1742 and 1746, surviving only as a fragment, the movement is a sinfonia of an otherwise lost cantata. In particular, the piece ends abruptly, with the last two bars (151 and 152) appearing in someone else's hand and attached as a separate page at the end of the manuscript, which is otherwise in Bach's hand. The work features a highly virtuosic concertato part with extensive chordal and arpeggiated passages and at one point reaches an "unusual high for Bach's violin music".
