= Harpsichord Concerto in E major, BWV 1053 =

Composition by Johann Sebastian Bach

Harpsichord Concerto in E major, BWV 1053
1. [Allegro]

2. Siciliano

3. Allegro
Performed by the Advent Chamber Orchestra with Matthew Ganong (harpsichord)

The Harpsichord Concerto in E major, BWV 1053, is a concerto for harpsichord and string orchestra by Johann Sebastian Bach. It is the second of Bach's keyboard concertos composed in 1738, scored for keyboard and baroque string orchestra. The movements were reworkings of parts of two of Bach's church cantatas composed in 1726: the solo obbligato organ played the sinfonias for the two fast movements; and the remaining alto aria provided the slow movement.

== Historical context ==
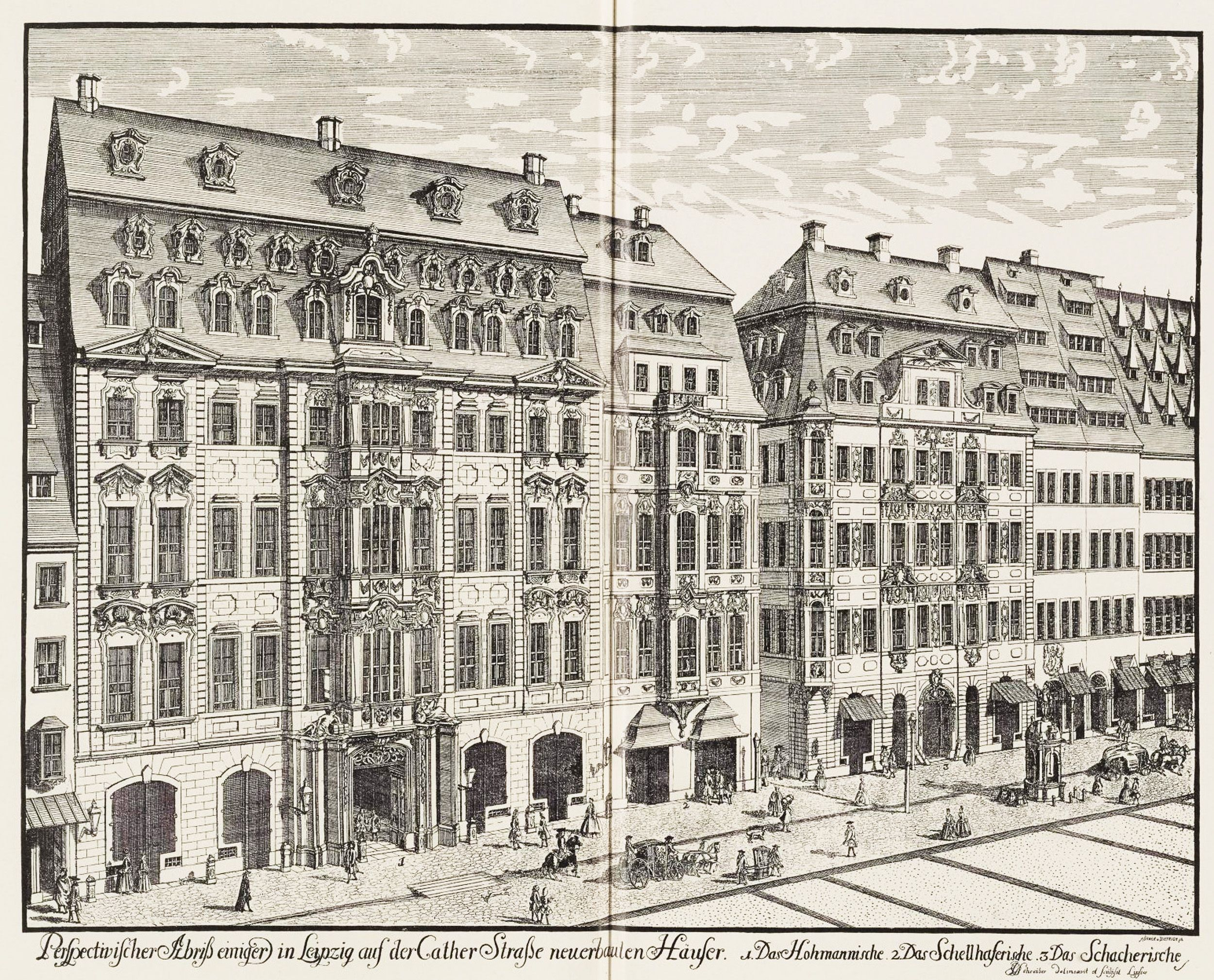
Johann Georg Schreiber, 1720: Engraving of Katherinenstrasse in Leipzig. In the centre is Café Zimmermann, where the Collegium Musicum held weekly chamber music concerts

Like the other harpsichord concertos, BWV 1053 is generally agreed to be a transcription of a lost instrumental concerto. As with the harpsichord concerto BWV 1052, all the movements had previous incarnations in Leipzig cantatas written ten or more years prior to the 1738 or 1739 autograph manuscript, with the part of the melody instrument written for obbligato organ. The first and second movements of BWV 1053 corresponds to the opening Sinfonia (in D major) and alto aria "Stirb in mir, Welt" (in B minor) in Gott soll allein mein Herze haben, BWV 169; and the finale to the opening Sinfonia (in E major) in Ich geh und suche mit Verlangen, BWV 49. The cantatas, part of a series where Bach developed the obbligato organ as a chamber or orchestral instrument, were first performed in October and November 1726 in the Thomaskirche, within two weeks of each other. The scoring in BWV 169 includes two oboes and a taille as ripieno instruments in the sinfonia and an oboe d'amore in the aria. In the aria, the lines of the alto soloist and organ weave around each in what Alfred Dürr has described as "undoubtedly one of the most inspired vocal pieces that Bach ever wrote ... a passionate submersion in heavenly love."

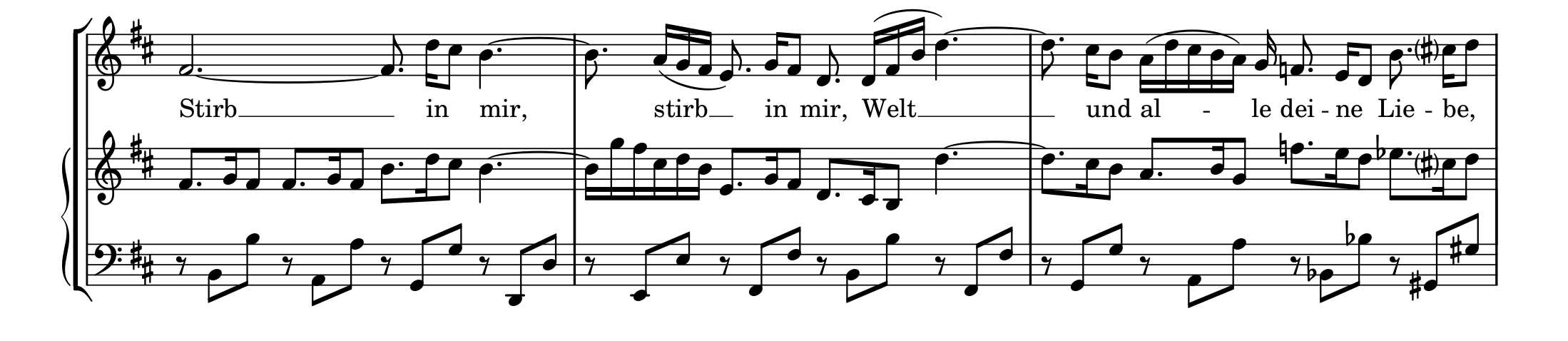

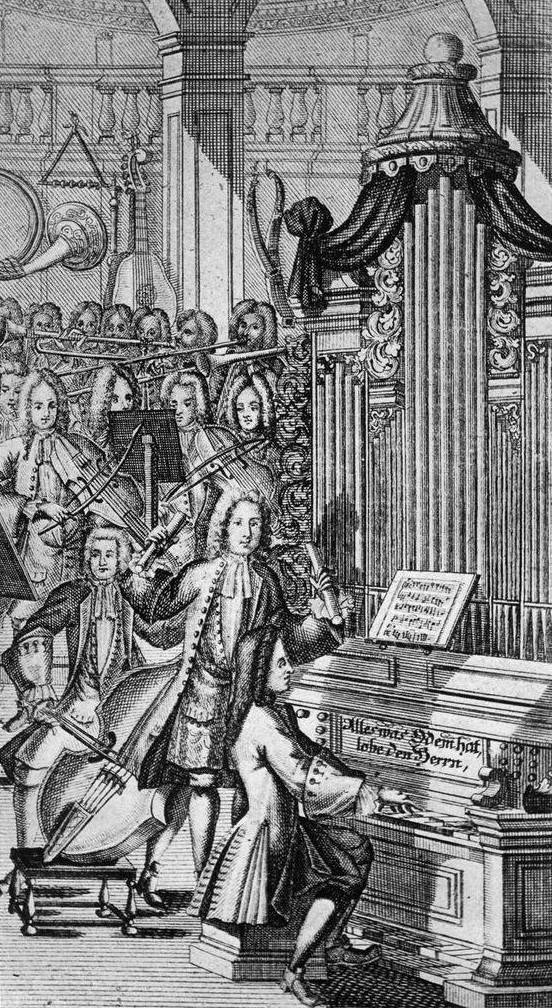
Composer directing cantata from gallery in a church, engraving from Musicalisches Lexicon, Johann Gottfried Walther, 1732

As Wolff (1994) comments, this shows the subtleties in Bach's process of arrangement. In this case the superposition of the additional vocal line over the keyboard part "aims at the exploration, enrichment and perfection of the original compositional material." An oboe d'amore was also added as a ripieno instrument in the sinfonia of BWV 49.

Since Ulrich Siegele's 1957 dissertation, where he suggested that BWV 1053 originated in either a flute concerto in F major or oboe concerto in E♭ major, a number of reconstructions for different melody instruments have been proposed, all discussed in Breig (2001): Hermann Töttcher & Gottfried Müller (in F major for oboe, 1955); by Wilfried Fischer (in E♭ major for oboe, 1966, and viola, 1996); by Joshua Rifkin (in E♭ major for oboe, 1983); by Arnold Mehl (in D major for oboe d'amore. 1983): and by Bruce Haynes (in D major for oboe d'amore, 1998). Further discussions concerning the possible original form of the concerto can be found in Butler (2008), Wolff (2008), and Rampe (2013). In Wolff (2016), problems with all the reconstructions are mentioned: for woodwind instruments, breathing problems created by long uninterrupted passages of semiquaver triplets in the third movement; and for the viola, the complete absence of string-like figurations in the whole concerto. Given the occurrence of all three movements in 1726 cantatas, he has suggested that the concerto might originally have been composed for an unspecified keyboard instrument—interchangeably a harpsichord or an organ depending on the venue—and that it might have been one of the pieces played during Bach's recital on the Silbermann organ in the Sophienkirche, Dresden in September 1725.

The harpsichord part in the first movement of BWV 1053 differs from the 1726 organ part in several ways in the solo passages: in the right hand the melody line became far more elaborate and ornamental; and in the left hand the figured bass line was replaced by a denser texture of fully worked out figures and chords—the left hand was "emancipated" in the words of Wolff (2002). At the same time in the orchestral parts, Bach reduced the contributions of the lower strings and adjusted the contributions from upper strings to create a proper balance with the harpsichord, with none of the string parts doubled except for the bass instruments. The lighter scoring permitted counterpoint between the first violin and the harpsichord in solo episodes. This method of adaptation—in the style of Bach's full maturity—was a departure from that used for BWV 1052 and was employed in the subsequent concertos BWV 1054–1057.

== Musical structure ==
=== First movement: [Allegro] ===
The musical structure of the first movement of BWV 1053—concisely written but complex in its many intricate and ingenious details—has been analysed in Berger (1997) and Rampe (2013). The movement combines the strict da capo A–B–A form of an aria with the ritornello structure of a concerto. Section A comprises 62 bars. In the opening eight-bar ritornello, the harpsichord initially plays as part of the ripieno, taking the first violin part in the right hand and the continuo in the left. After this tutti opening the harpsichord follows its own course, responding with a nine-bar episode that introduces its own material.

There are three further ritornello passages with two intermittent responses in solo episodes for the harpsichord. Bach devised the harpsichord's rhythmic thematic material as a contrasting counter-theme to the semiquaver motifs at the head of the ritornello. In each reprise the scoring of the ritornello is varied: the harpsichord alternates between its own counter-theme and that of the opening ritornello; it plays increasingly brilliant variants of its own material—eventually including joyful dactyl motifs—in counterpoint to the semiquaver violin theme. The middle section B is 51 bars long and is mostly in the minor mode, beginning in F♯ minor. There are three solo episodes for harpsichord punctuated by two reprises of the orchestral ritornello, first in F♯ (bar 69) and then in its relative major key, A major (bar 81). Less tied to the ritornello, the harpsichord freely develops its own material, which is derived from that of section A. The third and longest episode of 27 bars begins in bar 86 and remains centred on the tonality of C♯ minor. The strings provide a simple accompaniment to the long phrases of the extended harpsichord solo; between phrases the first violin plays a brief reprise in C♯ minor of the opening semiquaver motif of the ritornello. The episode culminates in a semiquaver passage over an extended G♯ pedal point and an Adagio cadence and fermata in C♯ minor. The movement then resumes with a recapitulation of the whole of section A.

=== Second movement: Siciliano ===
The slow movement in C♯ minor and 12/8 time is a Siciliano, which Jones (2013) has described as beautiful and haunting. In da capo form, the sustained string ritornello is accompanied by the harpsichord with an explicit realisation of the figured bass by gentle broken chord semiquavers. After the opening ritornello, the harpsichord, accompanied by detached quaver chords in the strings, plays its own melodic line spun out in two long increasingly ornamented phrases, the second of which merges into the semiquaver accompaniment of the closing ritornello.

=== Third movement: Allegro ===
The third movement of BWV 1053 is a sprightly and dance-like allegro in E major and 3/8 time. Like the first movement, its concise and ingenious compositional form combines the da capo structure of an aria with the ritornello structure of a concerto; it also has similarly light scoring in the orchestral parts to create a proper balance between harpsichord and strings. Although the overall structure is similar to that of the first movement, the alternations between concertato soloist and ripieno are more frequent and complex. Rather than the concertos of Vivaldi, Gregory Butler has suggested that this movement is closer in form and style to the concertos of another of Bach's Italian contemporaries, the Venetian composer Tomaso Albinoni. Butler has made a detailed study of Albinoni's two sets of twelve concerti a cinque, Op.7 (1715) and Op.9 (1722), each set having four violin concertos, four oboe concertos and four double oboe concertos, and has proposed the last movement of the double oboe concerto op.9, No.3 as a possible precursor of BWV 1053/3.

Bach's third movement is written in strict da capo A–B–A form, with 137 bars in the A section and 122 in the B section. The opening eighteen-bar ritornello has an introductory section or Vordersatz of four bars: the strings play the "head" motif—three quavers, four semiquavers and a quaver—in canon commencing in the first violin, then the second and then the viola. This rhythm is repeated in the first eight bars of the ritornello. Below the strings and the only instrument starting the movement, the harpsichord plays an introductory flourish of arpeggiated semiquaver triplets filling in the harmonies and spanning almost the entire keyboard. In the remainder of the ritornello the harpsichord doubles the first violin part in the right hand and the continuo in the left.

The harpsichord then begins its own thematic material in the first solo episode. At first it plays only the first four bars as a brief declamation, which elicits the ritornello's Vordersatz as a response. This is followed by a reprise by the harpsichord of the new thematic material, now extended to a sixteen bar episode.

This episode is followed by a reprise of the entire 18-bar ritornello in the dominant key of B major. In this reprise the lower string parts are pruned; now the right hand of the harpsichord part provides the counterpoint to the first violin part that instead of the second violin and viola; and the left hand plays its own semiquaver figuration in tandem with the continuo line. There are two further episodes for the harpsichord in which its own material is developed with passagework in semiquavers, in semiquaver triplets and in parallel and contrary motion semiquavers in both hands. These are separated by a shortened version of the ritornello and followed by a full version, with its last two bars pruned down to harpsichord and first violin. Section A concludes, following the traditional pattern established by Albinoni, with a repetition of the main body (Vorspinnung) and concluding part (Epilog) of the ritornello, with the harpsichord once more doubling the first violin and continuo parts.

In section B, which immediately follows, Bach breaks with tradition: now in the relative minor, G♯ minor, he introduces in the first solo harpsichord episode a highly contrasting chromatic theme accompanied by characteristic semiquaver figures in the left hand.

Of 38 bars in length and punctuated by fragmentary responses from the strings, the solo episode modulates through the keys of B major and C♯ minor to a cadence in F♯ minor. It is followed by a sequence of short passages alternating between ritornello material and solo material for the harpsichord drawn from both section B (semiquaver figures) and then section A (the beginning of the harpsichord theme). The ritornello segments move from F♯ minor to E major, the final segment modulating from F minor to B major and then E major. The next twelve bar solo episode continues with and develops the harpsichord's thematic material from section A, modulating from E major, to B major and then to the distant key of D♯ major. The 4-bar Vordersatz from the ritornello is then played in this key, then in G♯ major, reaching the key of C♯ minor. Section B ends symmetrically with an extended 33-bar solo episode, a variant of the long chromatic episode with which it began, After modulating through the keys of G♯ minor, C♯ minor and D♯ minor, the movement briefly halts in the manner of a Scarlatti da capo aria with a cadence to the mediant key of G♯ minor. The music resumes with a capitulation of section A.

== Selected recordings ==
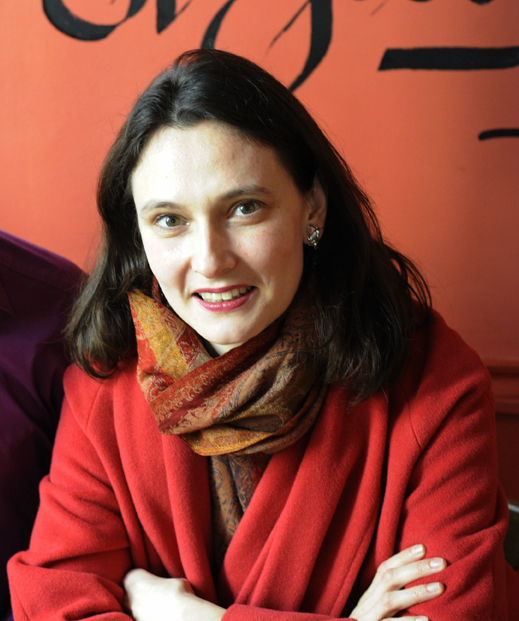
Béatrice Martin, harpsichordist

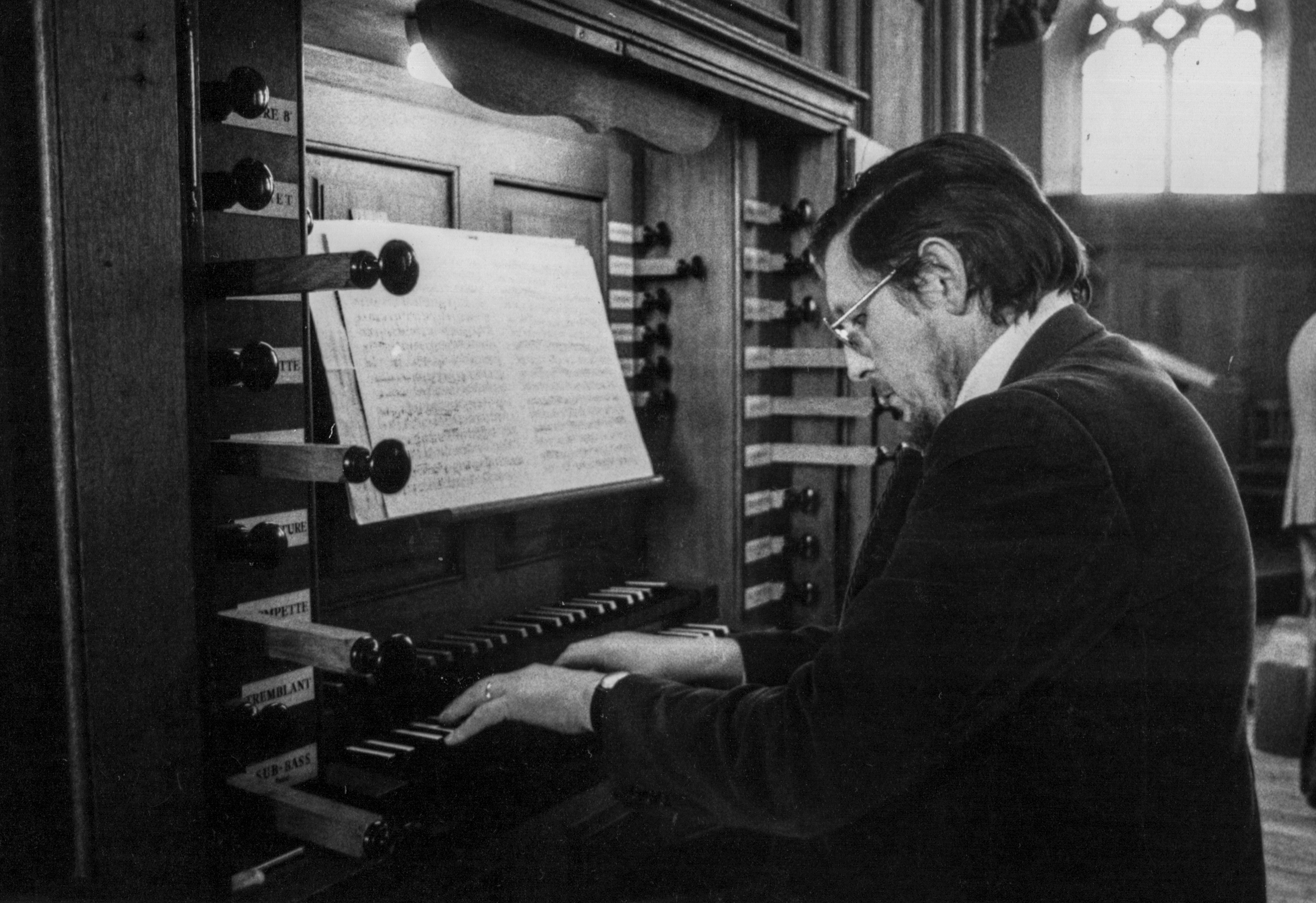
André Isoir, organist

=== With harpsichord ===
- Gustav Leonardt, Leonhardt-Consort; 1968; TelDec
- Igor Kipnis, The London Strings, Neville Marriner; 1971; CBS Masterworks Records M2YK 45616
- Trevor Pinnock, The English Concert; 1981; Archiv Produktion 471754-2 (2002 re-issue)
- Christine Schornsheim, Neues Bachisches Collegium Musicum, Burkhard Glaetzner; 1990-1992; Brilliant Classics
- Andreas Staier, Freiburger Barockorchester; 2013; Harmonia Mundi HMC 902181.82
- Christophe Rousset, The Academy of Ancient Music, Christopher Hogwood; 1999; L'Oiseau Lyre
- Béatrice Martin, Les Folies Françoises, Patrick Cohen-Akenine; 2011; Cypres
- Masaaki Suzuki, Bach Collegium Japan; 2018; Bis-2401

=== With piano ===
- Glenn Gould, Columbia Symphony Orchestra, Vladimir Golschmann; 1969; Columbia Masterworks, MS 7294
- Andrei Gavrilov, Academy of St. Martin in the Fields, Neville Marriner; 1987; EMI Classics 573641-2 (1999 re-issue)
- Murray Perahia, Academy of St. Martin in the Fields; 2000-2001; Sony Classical SK89245 / SK89690
- Angela Hewitt, Australian Chamber Orchestra, Richard Tognetti; 2005; Hyperion

=== With organ ===
- André Isoir, Le Parlement de Musique, Martin Gester; 1993; Calliope CAL 9720
- Peter Hurford, Royal Northern Sinfonia, Richard Hickox; 1990; Argo

=== With oboe ===
- Marcel Ponseele, Il Gardellino; 2005; Accent

== Sources ==
- Berger, Christian (1997), "Ein Spiel mit Form-Modellen. J.S. Bachs Cembalokonzert E-Dur BWV 1053", in Martin Geck; Werner Breig (eds.), Bachs Orchesterwerke: Bericht über das 1. Dortmunder Bach-Symposion im Januar 1996 (in German), Dortmund, pp. 257–263
- Breig, Werner (1999), Bach: Concertos for Harpsichord, Neue Bach Ausgabe, Bärenreiter, preface (note there is a later edition with piano reductions by Werner Breig)
- Breig, Werner (2001), Johann Sebastian Bach: Concertos for Cembalo BWV 1052–1059, with critical commentary, Neue Bach Ausgabe, vol. VII/4, Bärenreiter, ISMN 9790006494699
- Butler, Gregory (1995), "J.S. Bach's reception of Tomaso Albinoni's concertos", in Daniel R. Melamed (ed.), Bach Studies 2, Cambridge University Press, pp. 20–46, ISBN 0521028914
- Butler, Gregory (2008), "Bach the Cobbler: The Origins of Bach's E-major Concerto (BWV 1053)", in Gregory Butler (ed.), J. S. Bach's Concerted Ensemble Music: The Concerto, Bach Perspectives, vol. 7, University of Illinois Press, pp. 1–20, ISBN 9780252031656
- Dürr, Alfred (2006), The cantatas of J. S. Bach, Oxford University Press, pp. 392–397, ISBN 0-19-929776-2
- Haynes, Bruce (2001), The Eloquent Oboe: A History of the Hautboy 1640–1760, Oxford University Press, ISBN 9780198166467
- Jones, Richard D. P. (2013), The Creative Development of Johann Sebastian Bach, Volume II: 1717–1750: Music to Delight the Spirit, Oxford University Press, ISBN 9780199696284
- Rampe, Siegbert (2013), Bachs Orchester- und Kammermusik, Bach-Handbuch (in German), vol. 5/1, Laaber-Verlag, ISBN 978-3-89007-455-9
- Siegele, Ulrich (1957), Kompositionsweise und Bearbeitungstechnik in der Instrumentalmusik Johann Sebastian Bachs (dissertation) (in German), Hänssler, ISBN 3-7751-0117-9
- Williams, Peter (2016), Bach: A Musical Biography, Cambridge University Press, ISBN 978-1107139251
- Wolff, Christoph (1994), Bach: Essays on His Life and Work, Harvard University Press, ISBN 0674059263
- Wolff, Christoph (2002), Johann Sebastian Bach: the learned musician, Oxford University Press, ISBN 0-19-924884-2
- Wolff, Christoph (2008), "Sicilianos and Organ Recitals: Observations on J.S. Bach's concertos", in Gregory Butler (ed.), J. S. Bach's Concerted Ensemble Music: The Concerto, Bach Perspectives, vol. 7, University of Illinois Press, pp. 97–114, ISBN 978-0252031656
- Wolff, Christoph (2016), "Did Bach write organ concertos? A propos the prehistory of cantata movements with obbligato organ", in Dirst, Matthew (ed.), Bach and the Organ, Bach Perspectives, vol. 10, University of Illinois Press, pp. 60–75, ISBN 9780252040191, JSTOR 10.5406/j.ctt18j8xkb
