= Patrick Cohën-Akenine =

French classical violinist and conductor

Patrick Cohën-Akenine (born in 1966) is a French classical violinist and conductor.

== Biography ==
At the age of four, he began playing the violin and received a first prize for excellence from the Conservatoire à rayonnement régional de Rueil-Malmaison.

He then entered the Conservatoire de Paris. He devoted himself with passion to string quartets. He thus had the chance to work with the Amadeus, Alban Berg, Cleveland, Fine Arts, Guarneri quartets. He left for Budapest in order to follow the advice of Vilmos Tátrai. At the end of his studies he obtained a prize from the Ministry of Culture.

Passionate about early music, he learnt baroque violin with Patrick Bismuth at the CNSMDP and perfected his skills with Enrico Gatti.

After playing with Les Musiciens du Louvre and Les Arts Florissants, he took over the role of concertmaster in ensembles like Il Seminario Musicale, La Simphonie du Marais, Capriccio Stravagante, the Ricercar Consort, Les Talens Lyriques, Les Agrémens. Since 1994, he has been solo violin of the Concert Spirituel conducted by Hervé Niquet. Since then, he has recorded with several ensembles.

Since 1996, he has been teaching baroque violin at the Conservatoire of the 11th arrondissement of Paris, and at the Conservatoire à rayonnement départemental d'Orsay. In 2008, under the patronage of the Centre de musique baroque de Versailles, Cohën conducted an orchestra restoration program, Les Vingt-quatre Violons du Roi, with an original setting.

In 2000, with Béatrice Martin, he created the ensemble "Les Folies Françoises", with which he approaches a large number of works from the Baroque music repertoire in a chamber music spirit. In December 2006, he was made a Chevalier of the Ordre des Arts et des Lettres.
