= Robert Reitz =

Swiss classical violinist (1884–1951)

Robert Karl Friedrich Reitz (17 June 1884 – April 1951) was a Swiss violinist and university lecturer. He was concert master of the Staatskapelle Weimar, first violinist of the Reitz Quartet and professor at the Hochschule für Musik Franz Liszt, Weimar.

== Life ==
Reitz was born in 1884 in Burgdorf as the son of the Burgdorf music director Georg Friedrich "Fritz" Reitz (18581956). He received his first violin lessons from his father and began to perform publicly at the age of eight. After attending the grammar school in his home town, he went to Germany and studied violin with Hans Sitt, theory with Paul Quasdorf and chamber music with Carl Reinecke, Carl Herrmann and Julius Klengel at the University of Music and Theatre Leipzig. He also played with the Gewandhausorchester. In 1906, he went to Felix Berber in Munich. In 1912, he had lessons with Hugo Heermann and Carl Flesch.

He found his first employment as concert master in 1904 in Majorenhof near Riga. From 1904 to 1906, he was concertmaster, solo violinist and conductor of the Görlitz City Orchestra. In 1906/07, he took up a position as concertmaster and solo violinist at the Philharmonic Orchestra of Wroclaw. Afterwards, he was 1st concertmaster, quartet leader and conductor at the Theater Kiel and at the orchestra of the Musikfreunde Kiel. During the summer months, he also conducted the Kurkapelle in Westerland.

In 1909, Reitz took over the post of 1st concertmaster at the Staatskapelle Weimar, and in 1915 he was appointed court concertmaster. From 1909 to 1935 he was head of a violin class (from 1926 a university class) at the Staatliche Musikschule Weimar (from 1930 Weimar Conservatory); in 1919, he received a professorat. Among his pupils were among others Marlene Dietrich, with whom he occasionally had an affair. Since Reitz had many fields of activity as a musician, Bruno Hinze-Reinhold additionally engaged the Berlin pedagogue Paul Elgers. In 1920, Reitz temporarily left the music school. In addition to his position as concertmaster, he was primarius of the Reitz Quartet in various formations from 1909 to 1945. In addition, together with Eduard Rosé (violoncello) and Bruno Hinze-Reinhold (piano) he formed the Weimar Trio. His successor became the violin virtuoso Max Strub. Although Reitz had become a member of the NSDAP, the Nazis saw him as a competitor and he was transferred back from the orchestra to the Musikhochschule in 1934. Reitz was an arranger of violin concertos (Tartini, Pisendel and Stamitz) and the Mystery Sonatas of Bieber. He also reconstructed Bach's Violin concert in D minor from BWV 1052, which he published at Breitkopf & Härtel. During his Weimar years, he had a significant influence on the musical life of the city.

In 1942, he moved back to Switzerland and thus escaped denazification after the war. From 1945 to 1951 he was concert master at Radio Beromünster.

Reitz was married and father of three children.

== Awards ==
- 1911: Silver medal for art and science ( Saxe-Coburg and Gotha )
