= Béatrice Martin (harpsichordist) =

French harpsichordist (born 1973)

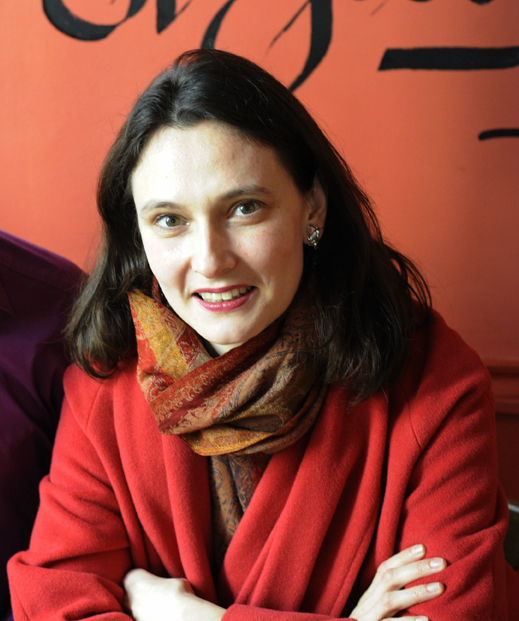
- Martin in 2011

Background information
- Born: 1973 (age 52–53); Annecy, Auvergne-Rhône-Alpes, France
- Instrument: Harpsichord
- Years active: 1979–present
- Member of: Les Folies françoises
- Award: Diapason d'or

Béatrice Martin (born 1973) is a French harpsichordist.

== Life ==
Born in Annecy, Martin began playing the harpsichord at the age of 6 years old in parallel with dancing. She studied at the Conservatoire de Musique de Genève then Conservatoire de Paris. She has been a regular harpsichordist with Les Arts Florissants under William Christie, for whom she acted as principal assistant.

In 2000, she founded the ensemble "Les Folies françoises" with the violinist and conductor Patrick Cohën-Akenine.

She is a professor at the Escola Superior de Música de Catalunya in Barcelona and has been a guest professor at the Juilliard School in New York since 2015.

She has recorded about ten CDs, including recordings of Bach's Sonatas for violin and harpsichord, BWV 1014–1019, with Patrick Cohën-Akenine. Her album Bach: concertos pour clavecin (BWV 1052, 1053, 1055, 1056), with "Les Folies françoises", was awarded a Diapason d'or in 2016.

== Prizes and awards ==
- 1998: First prize for harpsichord at the MAfestival Brugge.
- 1999: Prix Bärenreiter Publishers
- 1999: Révélation de l'ADAMI au MIDEM de Cannes.
