= Damien Guillon =

French countertenor (born 1981)

Damien Guillon (born 1981) is a French countertenor. He is leader of the ensemble Le Banquet Celeste.

== Selected discography ==
Solo recitals:

- JS Bach Cantatas BWV 35, BWV 170. Trio BWV 527. Maude Gratton. Le Banquet Celeste (2012)
- John Dowland Lute songs Eric Bellocq 2012

Opera:

- Stefano Landi La Morte d'Orfeo - in the role of Fosforo.
