= Bruno Cocset =

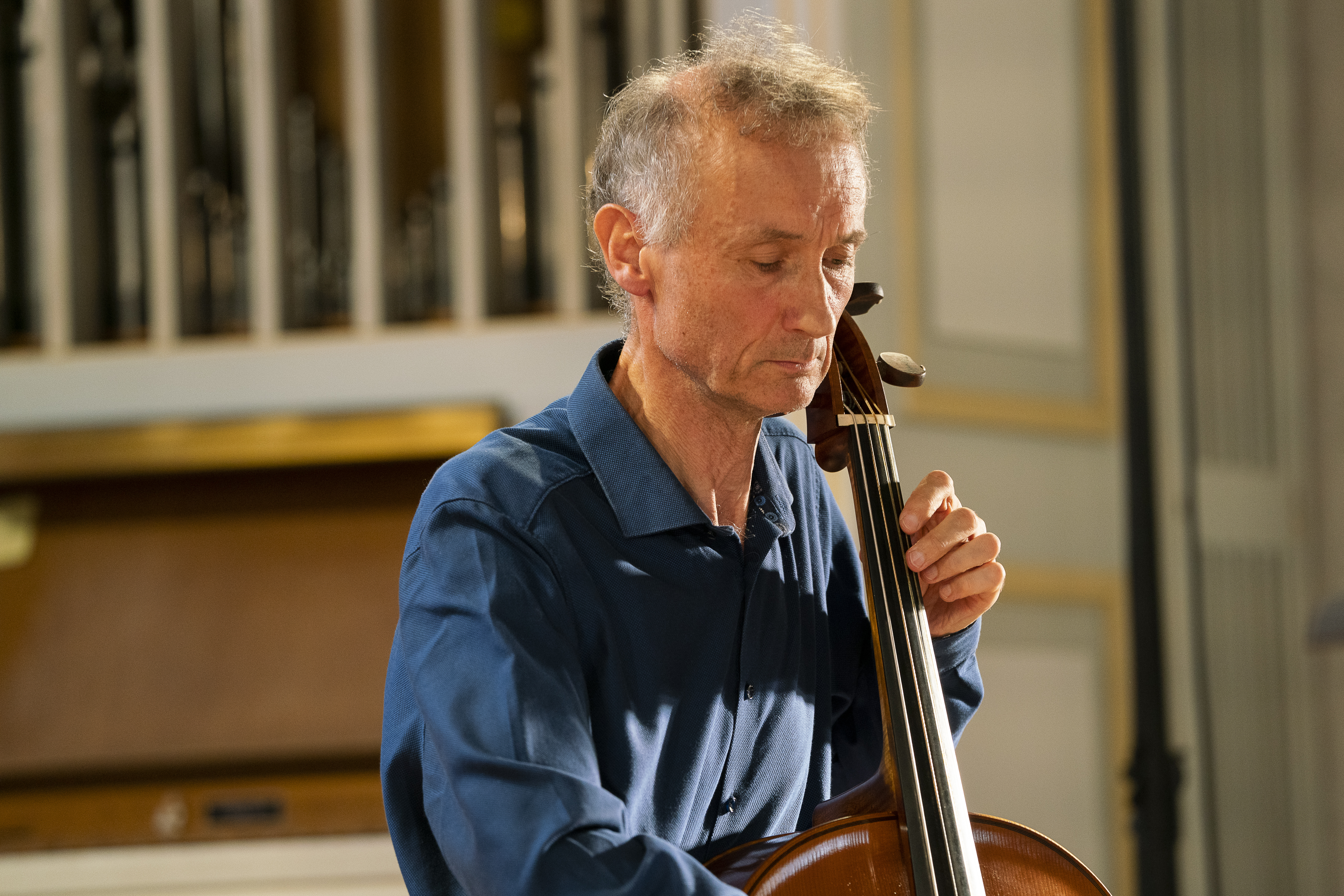
Bruno Cocset. Haapsalu, 2022

Bruno Cocset (born in 1963 in France) is a baroque cello player. After studying in National Conservatory of Tours, he received classes from Anner Bylsma, Jaap Schröder, and Christophe Coin. He has worked with many of the most important "historically informed" groups of Europe, having recording mainly with Jordi Savall's Le Concert des Nations before he created his own baroque ensemble: Les Basses Réunies. He is well known for the "rescue" of forgotten composers, such as Jean-Baptiste Barrière or Evaristo Felice Dall'Abaco, two examples of a vast corpus of recordings including innovative versions of Bach Cello Suites and Vivaldi Cello Concerti and Sonatas.
