= Harpsichord Concerto in D minor, BWV 1052 =

Composition by Johann Sebastian Bach

Harpsichord Concerto
- by J. S. Bach
- Key: D minor
- Catalogue: BWV 1052
- Movements: 3
- Scoring: harpsichord; 2 violins; viola; basso continue

Keyboard Concerto No. 1 in D minor, BWV 1052
1. Allegro

2. Adagio

3. Allegro
Performed by the Fulda Symphonic Orchestra conducted by Simon Schindler with Johannes Volker Schmidt (piano)

The Harpsichord Concerto in D minor, BWV 1052, is a concerto for harpsichord with two violin parts, viola and basso continuo by Johann Sebastian Bach. In three movements, marked Allegro, Adagio and Allegro, it is the first Bach listed in his manuscript of Bach's harpsichord concertos, BWV 1052–1065.

== Historical context ==
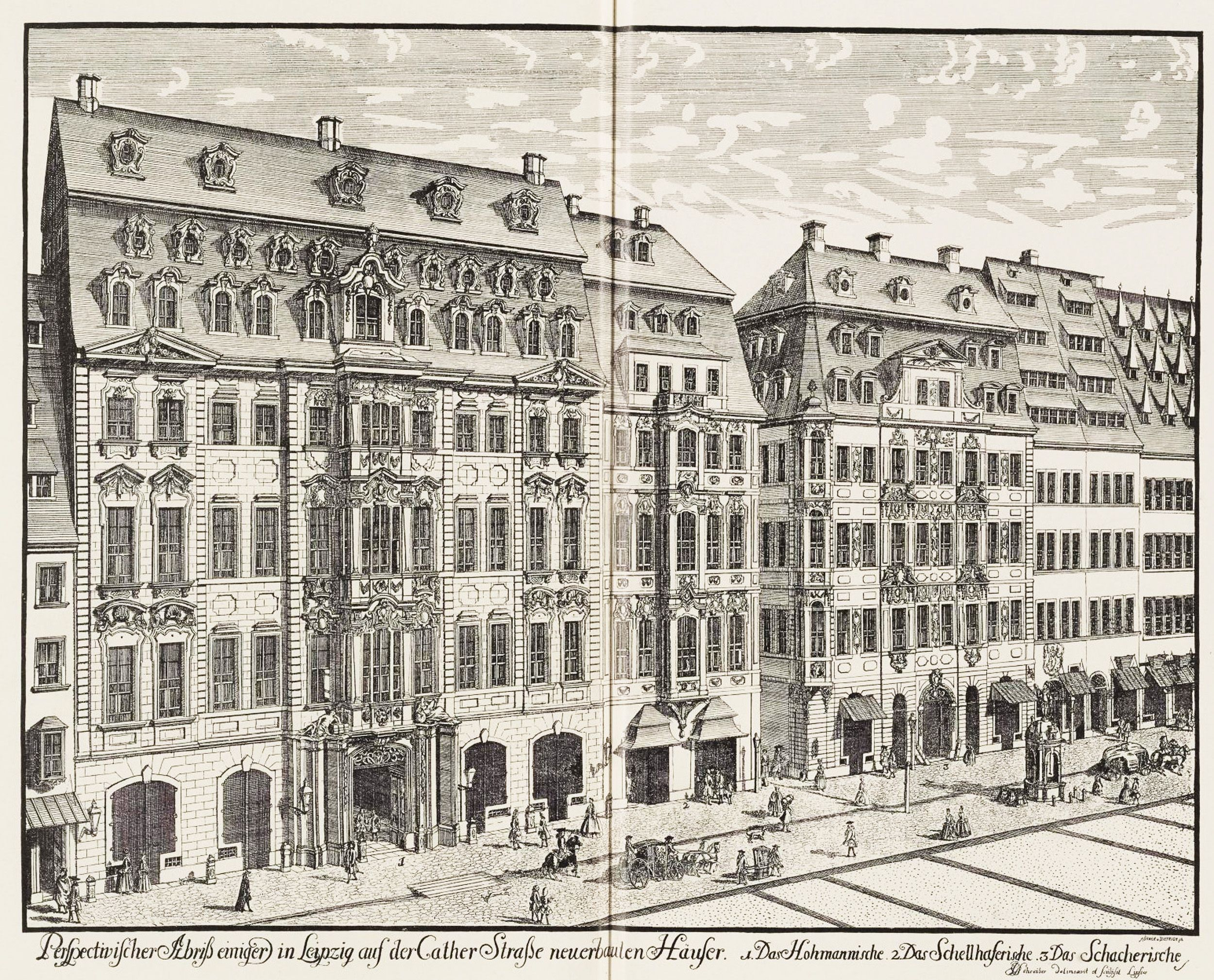
Johann Georg Schreiber, 1720: Engraving of Katherinenstrasse in Leipzig. In the centre is Café Zimmermann, where the Collegium Musicum held weekly chamber music concerts

The earliest surviving manuscript of the concerto can be dated to 1734; it was made by Bach's son Carl Philipp Emanuel and contained only the orchestral parts, the harpsichord part being added later. This version is known as BWV 1052a. The definitive version BWV 1052 was recorded by Bach himself in the autograph manuscript of all eight harpsichord concertos BWV 1052–1058, made around 1738.

In the second half of the 1720s, Bach had already written versions of all three movements of the concerto for two of his cantatas with obbligato organ as solo instrument: the first two movements for the sinfonia and first choral movement of Wir müssen durch viel Trübsal in das Reich Gottes eingehen, BWV 146 (1726); and the last movement for the opening sinfonia of Ich habe meine Zuversicht, BWV 188 (1728). In these cantata versions the orchestra was expanded by the addition of oboes.

Like the other harpsichord concertos, BWV 1052 has been widely believed to be a transcription of a lost concerto for another instrument. Beginning with Wilhelm Rust and Philipp Spitta, many scholars suggested that the original melody instrument was the violin, because of the many violinistic figurations in the solo part—string-crossing, open string techniques—all highly virtuosic. Williams (2016) has speculated that the copies of the orchestral parts made in 1734 (BWV 1052a) might have been used for a performance of the concerto with Carl Philipp Emanuel as soloist. There have been several reconstructions of the putative violin concerto; Ferdinand David made one in 1873; Robert Reitz in 1917; and Wilfried Fischer prepared one for Volume VII/7 of the Neue Bach Ausgabe in 1970 based on BWV 1052. In 1976, in order to resolve playability problems in Fischer's reconstruction, Werner Breig suggested amendments based on the obbligato organ part in the cantatas and BWV 1052a.

In the twenty-first century, however, Bach scholarship has moved away from any consensus regarding a violin original. In 2016, for example, two leading Bach scholars, Christoph Wolff and Gregory Butler, published independently conducted research that led each to conclude that the original form of BWV 1052 was an organ concerto composed within the first few years of Bach's tenure in Leipzig. (Previous scholarship often held that Bach composed the original in Weimar or Cöthen.) Both relate the work to performances by Bach of concerted movements for organ and orchestra in Dresden and Leipzig. Wolff also details why the violinistic figuration in the harpsichord part does not demonstrate that it is a transcription from a previous violin part; for one thing, the "extended and extreme passagework" in the solo part "cannot be found in any of Bach's violin concertos"; for another, he points to other relevant Bach keyboard works that "display direct translations of characteristic violin figuration into idiomatic passagework for the keyboard." Peter Wollny also disagrees with the hypothesis that the works might have originally been a violin concerto. According to Bach Digital,

Dass das Konzert die Bearbeitung eines Violinkonzert darstellt, ist unwahrscheinlich.

Translation:

It is unlikely that the concerto represents the arrangement of a violin concerto.

== Musical structure ==
Bach's first harpsichord in D minor, BWV 1052 is in three movements, marked Allegro, Adagio and Allegro. It is scored for harpsichord and Baroque string orchestra (2 violins, viola, cello and continuo). BWV 1052 has similarities with Vivaldi's highly virtuosic Grosso mogul violin concerto, RV 208, which Bach had previously transcribed for solo organ in BWV 594. It is considered one of Bach's greatest concertos: in the words of Jones (2013) it "conveys a sense of huge elemental power". This mood is created in the opening sections of the two outer movements. Both start in the manner of Vivaldi with unison writing in the ritornello sections.

=== First and third movements: Allegro ===
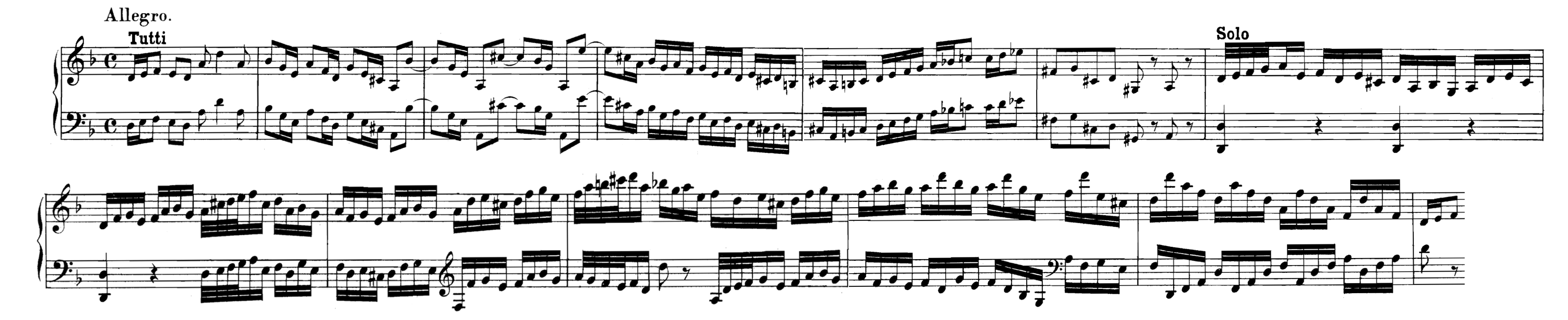

The last movement begins as follows:

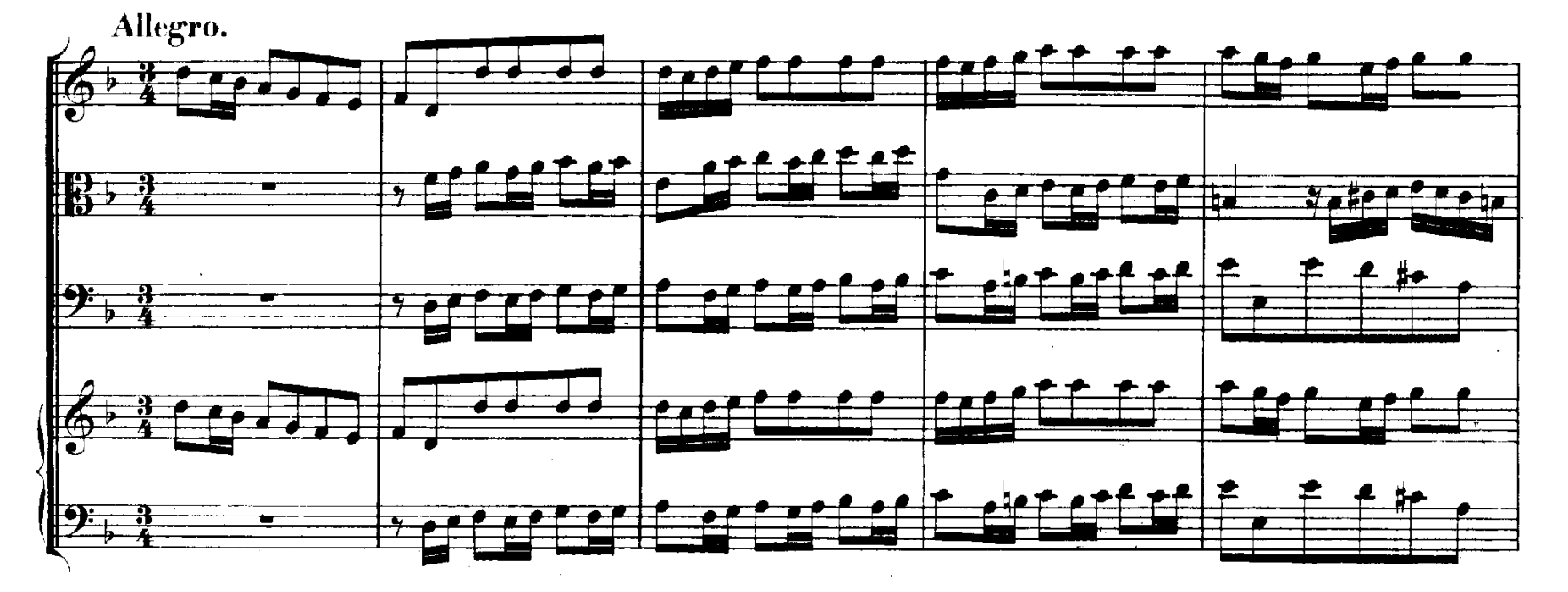

Bach then proceeds to juxtapose passages in the key of D minor with passages in A minor: in the first movement this concerns the first 27 bars; and in the last the first 41 bars. These somewhat abrupt changes in tonality convey the spirit of a more ancient modal type of music. In both movements the A sections are fairly closely tied to the ritornello material which is interspersed with brief episodes for the harpsichord. The central B sections of both movements are freely developed and highly virtuosic; they are filled with violinistic figurations including keyboard reworkings of bariolage, a technique that relies on the use of the violin's open strings. The B section in the first movement starts with repeated note bariolage figures:

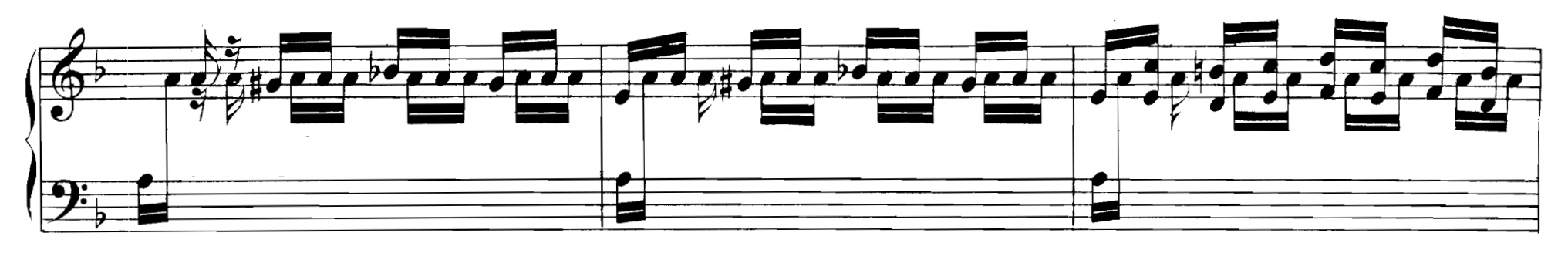

which, when they recur later, become increasingly virtuosic and eventually merge into brilliant filigree demisemiquaver figures—typical of the harpsichord—in the final extended cadenza-like episode before the concluding ritornello.

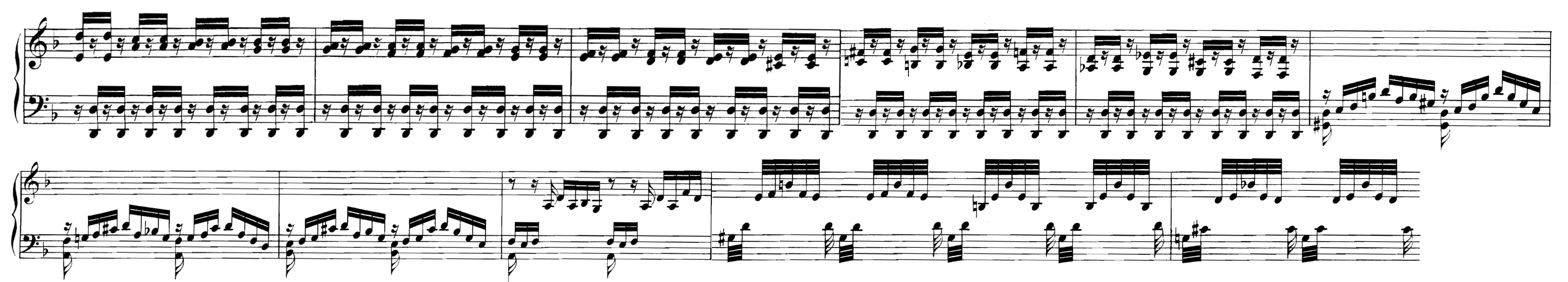

Throughout the first movement the harpsichord part also has several episodes with "perfidia"—the same half bar semiquaver patterns repeated over a prolonged period. Both outer movements are in an A–B–A′ form: the A section of the first movement is in bars 1–62, the B section starts with the bariolage passage and lasts from bar 62 to bar 171, the A′ section lasts from bar 172 until the end; the A section of the final movement is in bars 1–84, the B section in bars 84–224, and the A′ section from bar 224 until the end. In the first movement the central section is in the keys of D minor and E minor; in the last movement the keys are D minor and A minor. As in the opening sections, the shifts between the two minor tonalities are sudden and pronounced. In the first movement Bach creates another equally dramatic effect by interrupting the relentless minor-key passages with statements of the ritornello theme in major keys. Jones describes these moments of relief as providing "a sudden, unexpected shaft of light".

The highly rhythmic thematic material of the solo harpsichord part in the third movement has similarities with the opening of the third Brandenburg Concerto.

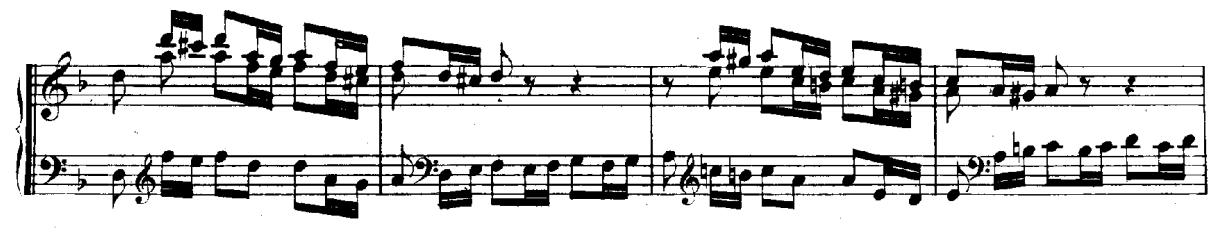

In both B sections Bach adds unexpected features: in the first movement what should be the last ritornello is interrupted by a brief perfidia episode building up to the true concluding ritornello; similarly in the last movement, after five bars of orchestral ritornello marking the beginning of the A′ section, the thematic material of the harpsichord introduces a freely developed 37-bar highly virtuosic episode culminating in a fermata (for an extemporised cadenza) before the concluding 12 bar ritornello.

=== Second movement: Adagio ===
The slow movement, an Adagio in G minor and 3/4 time, is built on a ground bass which is played in unison by the whole orchestra and the harpsichord in the opening ritornello.

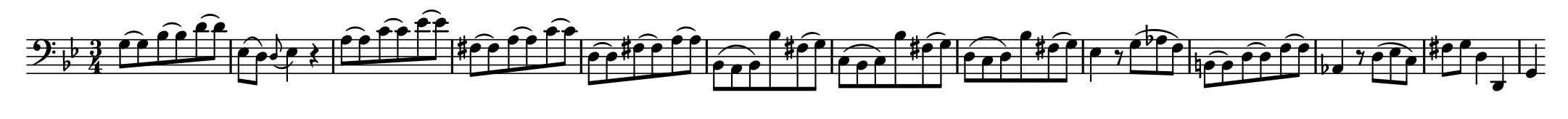

It continues throughout the piece providing the foundations over which the solo harpsichord spins a florid and ornamented melodic line in four long episodes.

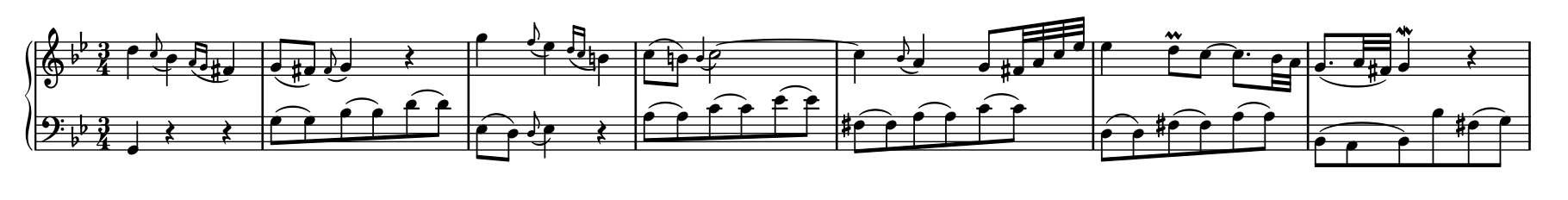

The subdominant tonality of G minor also plays a role in the outer movements, in the bridging passages between the B and A′ sections. More generally Jones (2013) has pointed out that the predominant keys in the outer movements centre around the open strings of the violin.

== Reception ==
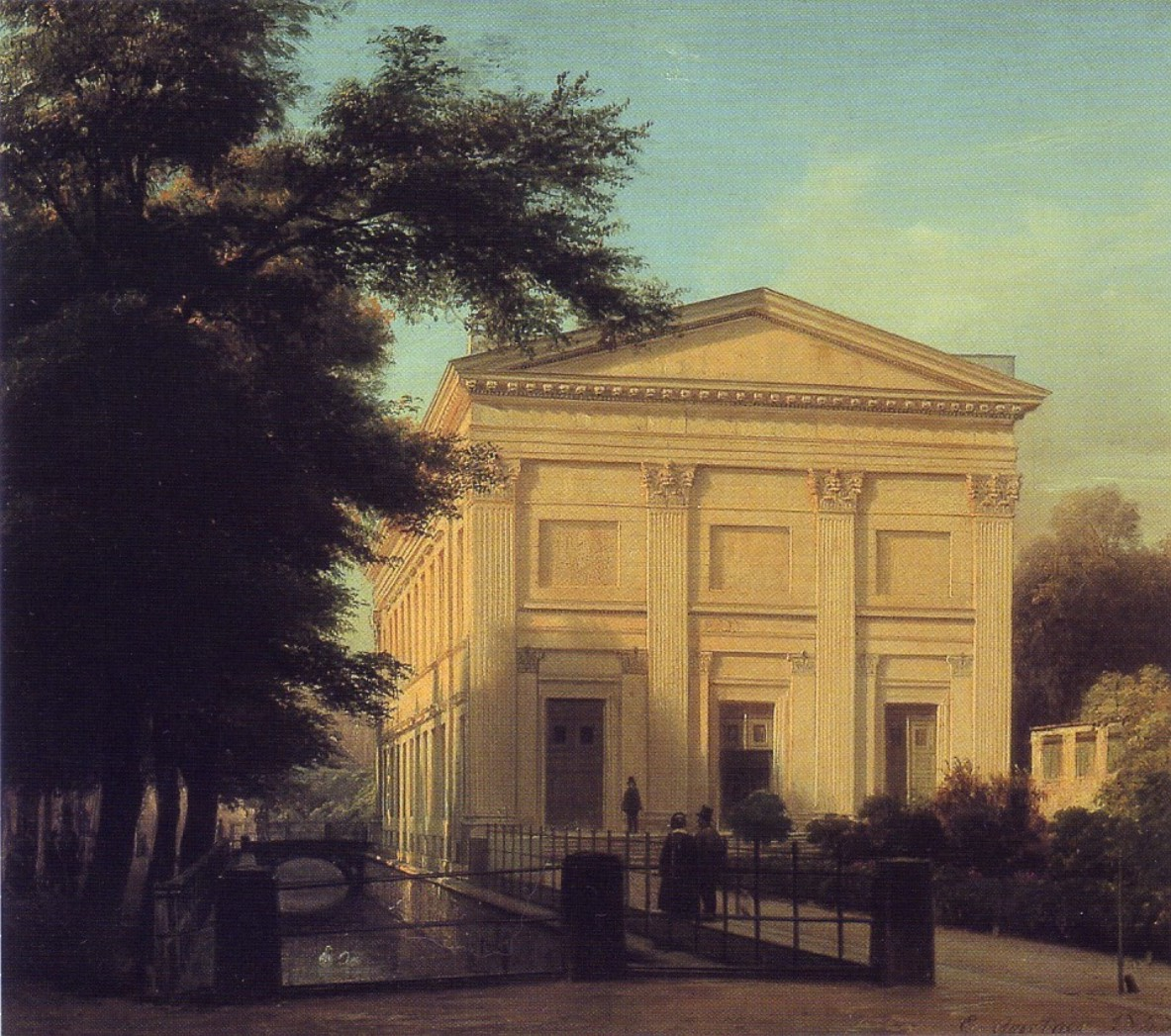
The Singakademie in 1843 (Designed by Carl Theodor Ottmer; painting by Eduard Gaertner)

Several hand copies of the concerto—the standard method of transmission—survive from the 18th century; for instance there are hand copies by Johann Friedrich Agricola around 1740, by Christoph Nichelmann and an unknown scribe in the early 1750s. Its first publication in print was in 1838 by the Kistner Publishing House.

The performance history in the nineteenth century can be traced back to the circle of Felix Mendelssohn. In the first decade of the 19th century the harpsichord virtuoso and great aunt of Mendelssohn, Sara Levy, gave public performances of the concerto in Berlin at the Sing-Akademie, established in 1791 by the harpsichordist Carl Friedrich Christian Fasch and subsequently run by Mendelssohn's teacher Carl Friedrich Zelter. In 1824 Mendelssohn's sister Fanny performed the concerto at the same venue. In 1835 Felix Mendelssohn played the concerto in his first year as director of the Gewandhaus in Leipzig. There were further performances at the Gewandhaus in 1837, 1843 and 1863. Ignaz Moscheles, a friend and teacher of Mendelssohn as well as a fellow devotee of Bach, gave the first performance of the concerto in London in 1836 at a benefit concert, adding one flute and two clarinets, bassoons and horns to the orchestra. In a letter to Mendelssohn, he disclosed that he intended the woodwind section to have the "same position in the Concerto as the organ in the performance of a Mass". Robert Schumann subsequently described Moscheles' reorchestration as "very beautiful". The following year Moscheles performed the concerto at the Academy of Ancient Music with Bach's original string orchestration. The Musical World reported that Moscheles "elicited such unequivocal testimonies of delight, as the quiet circle of the Ancient Concert subscribers rarely indulge in".

The concerto was first published in 1838 in Leipzig. Johannes Brahms later composed a cadenza for the last movement of the concerto, which was published posthumously.

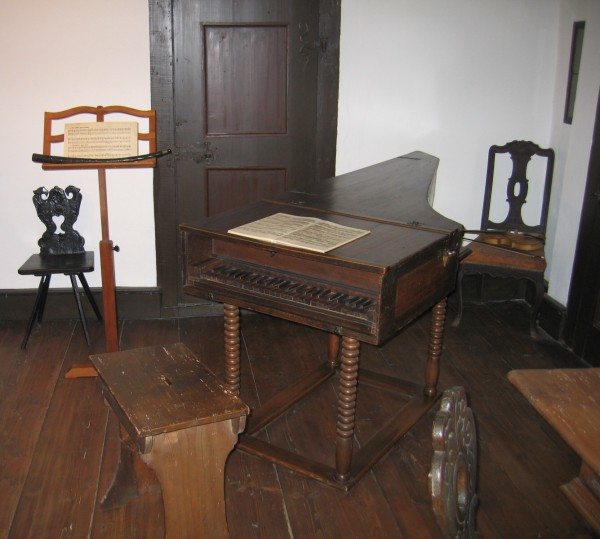
Single-manual harpsichord at the Bach House in Eisenach

== Selected recordings with harpsichord ==
- Herbert Tachezi, Concentus musicus Wien; 1968; Teldec
- Igor Kipnis, The London Strings, Neville Marriner; 1971; CBS Masterworks Records M2YK 45616
- Trevor Pinnock, The English Concert; 1981; Archiv Produktion 471754-2 (2002 re-issue)
- Christine Schornsheim, Neues Bachisches Collegium Musicum, Burkhard Glaetzner; 1990–1992; Brilliant Classics
- Andreas Staier, Freiburger Barockorchester; 2013; Harmonia Mundi HMC 902181.82
- Christophe Rousset, Academy of Ancient Music, Christopher Hogwood; 1999; L'Oiseau Lyre
- Béatrice Martin, Les Folies Françoises, Patrick Cohen-Akenine; 2011; Cypres
- Masaaki Suzuki, Bach Collegium Japan; 2018; Bis-2401
