= Louis-Gabriel Guillemain =

French composer and violinist

- Born: November 5, 1705; Paris, France
- Died: October 1, 1770 (aged 64); Chaville, France
- Occupations: Composer; violinist

Louis-Gabriel Guillemain (5 November 1705 – 1 October 1770) was a French composer and violinist.

== Biography ==
Guillemain is thought to have been born in Paris, was brought up by the Count de Rochechouart, and started studying violin at an early age. He was then sent to Italy to complete his training as violinist, and studied under Giovanni Battista Somis in Turin. At the age of 24, Guillemain was working in Lyons, where he quickly established himself as one of the most sought-after performers, and was appointed first violinist of the Acadèmie de Musique. His opus 1, Premier livre de sonates for violin and basso continuo, was published in Dijon in 1734.

Guillemain eventually moved back to Paris, where, in 1737, he became a musicien ordinaire to the King. His career was progressing rapidly, and by the early 1740s the composer was among the highest-paid musicians at the court, regularly performing in private concerts before the royal couple. He continued publishing his music, and his works were frequently performed at the court in the late 1740s and early 1750s. Fellow composer Louis-Claude Daquin praised Guillemain in his 1752 Lettre sur les hommes célèbres:

When one speaks of a man full of fire, genius and life, one has to think of Monsieur Guillemain, Musician to the King; he is perhaps the most extraordinary and adroit violinist one can hear play. There are no difficulties that can stump him and he can compose learned pieces which sometimes embarrass his rivals. Among the great Masters, this celebrated artist is one of the most productive. His works are full of touching beauty.

However, Guillemain's private life was troubled. He was apparently a heavy drinker, especially in his later years, and he was also continually in debt because of his extravagant spending. He died in Chaville, then a small settlement near Paris, in 1770; some contemporary accounts describe his death as a bloody suicide, with the composer stabbing himself with a knife fourteen times. However, the drinking habit and the fact that Guillemain was buried, may indicate that he died a natural death.

== List of works ==
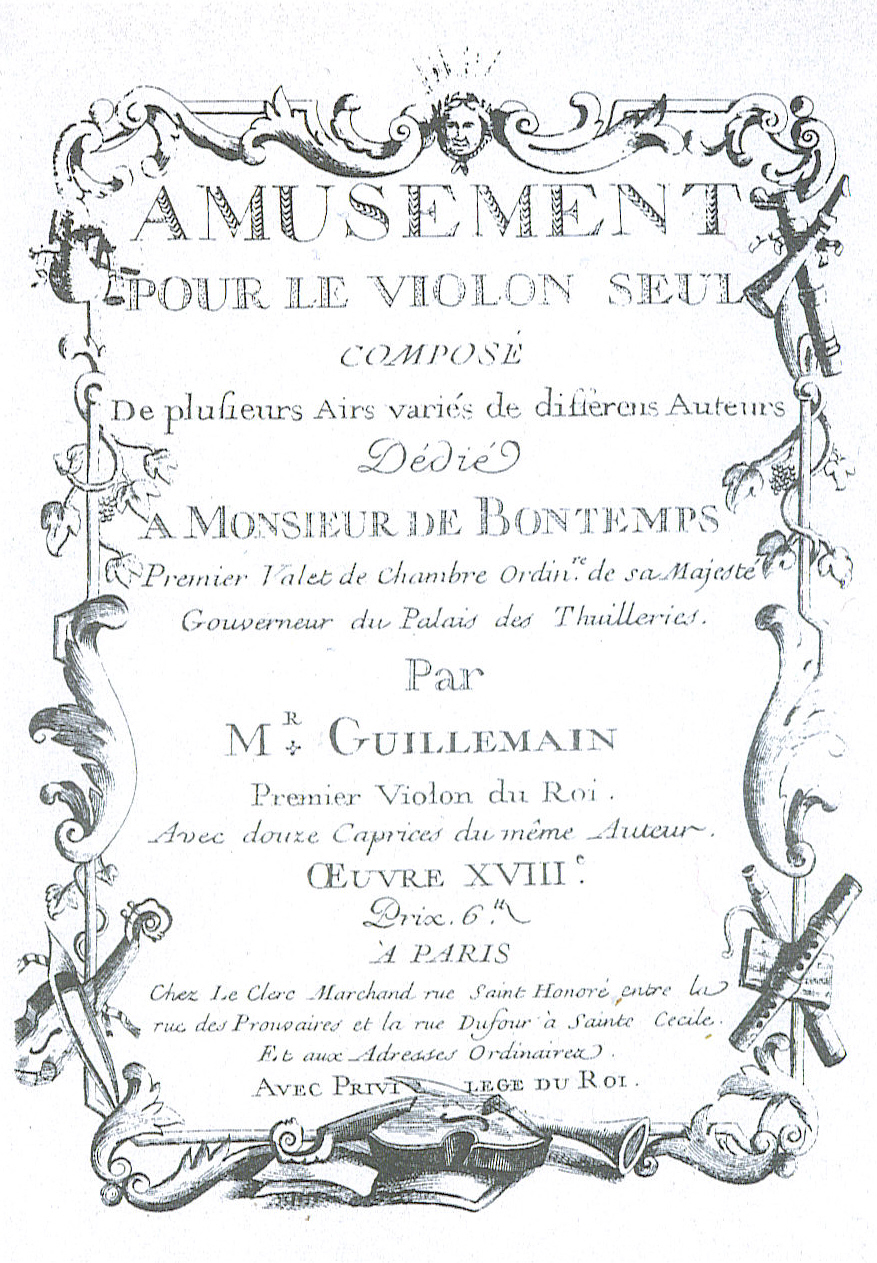
Front cover of Guillemain's Op. 18, the last known publication by him

All published in Paris, unless specified otherwise.

- Opus 1: Premier livre de sonates, 12 sonatas for violin and basso continuo (Dijon, 1734)
- Opus 2: XII sonates en trio pour les violons et flûtes, 12 trio sonatas (c. 1738)
- Opus 3: Deuxième livre de sonates, sonatas for violin and basso continuo (1739)
- Opus 4: VI sonates for 2 violins (1739)
- Opus 5: Deuxième livre de sonates, sonatas for two violins/flutes (1739)
- Opus 6: VI symphonies dans le goût italien en trio, for 2 violins and basso continuo (1740)
- Opus 7: Six concertinos à quatre parties, for 2 violins, viola, and basso continuo (1740)
- Opus 8: Premier amusement à la mode, for two violins/flutes and basso continuo (1740)
- Opus 9: Pièces for two vielles/musettes/flutes/violins (c. 1741), lost
- Opus 10: Six sonates en trio, for 2 violins and basso continuo (1741)
- Opus 11: Troisième livre de sonates, for violin(s) and basso continuo (1742)
- Opus 12: Six sonates en quatuors ou conversations galantes, for flute, violin, bass viol, and basso continuo (1743)
- Opus 13: Pièces de clavecin en sonates avec accompagnement de violon, 6 pieces for violin and harpsichord (1745)
- L'opérateur chinois, ballet-pantomime (c. 1748)
- La Cabale sur un livret de Saint-Foix, comédie épisodique (c. 1748)
- Opus 14: Second livre de symphonies dans le goût italien en trio, 6 symphonies for 2 violins and basso continuo (1748)
- Opus 15: Divertissemens de symphonies en trio, for 2 violins and basso continuo (1751)
- Opus 16: Symphonies d'un goût nouveau en forme de concerto pour les musettes, vielles, flûtes ou hautbois (1752), lost
- Opus 17: Second livre de sonates en quatuor, for flute, violin, bass viol, and basso continuo (1756)
- Opus 18: Amusement pour le violon seul composé de plusieurs airs variés de différens auteurs … avec douze caprices, for solo violin, incl. pieces by other composers (1762)

A few other pieces by Guillemain appeared in contemporary anthologies.
