= Schlage doch, gewünschte Stunde, BWV 53 =

Aria from a church cantata formerly attributed to Johann Sebastian Bach

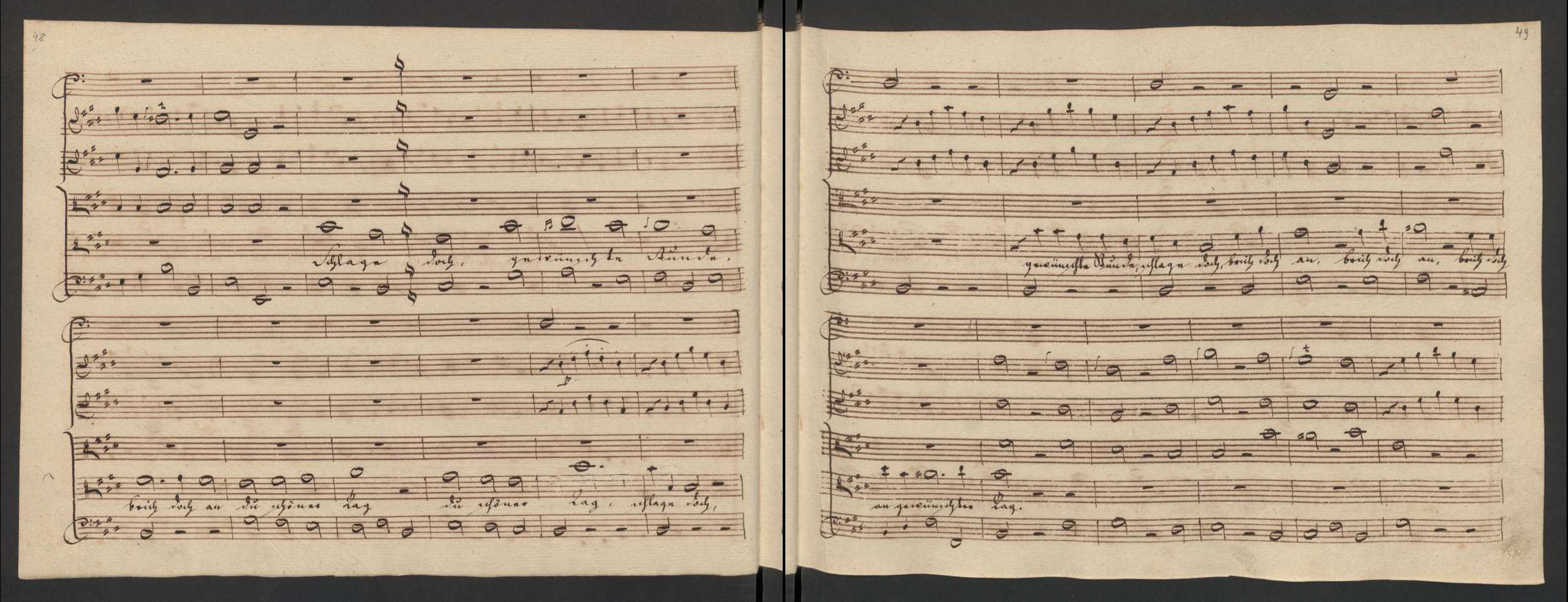
Pages 3–4 of the aria "Schlage doch, gewünschte Stunde". Manuscript copy, 1780, Berlin State Library. The campanella bells are marked on the top stave.

Schlage doch, gewünschte Stunde (Haste to strike, oh longed for hour), BWV 53, is an aria for alto, bells, strings and continuo. It was likely composed in the early 18th century, although its date of first performance is unknown. From the second half of the 18th century until the early 1950s the aria was attributed to Johann Sebastian Bach. In 1955, it was suggested by the Bach scholar Karl Anton that the aria's composer was more likely to be a member of Melchior Hoffmann's circle.

The aria was likely part of an otherwise lost church cantata for a funeral. The aria was first published in 1863, by the Bach Gesellschaft. It is one of three works to have been attributed to Bach before being attributed to Hoffmann, the others being the German Magnificats BWV 189 and BWV Anh. 21. It is one of the oldest known western compositions in which tuned bells are used in concert with other musical instruments.

== History and attribution ==
The cantata has often been attributed to Johann Sebastian Bach. However, Alfred Dürr did not include it in his 1971 book Die Kantaten von Johann Sebastian Bach, based on the Bach-Jahrbuch 1955. In the Appendix of the subsequent English version of the 2006 book on Bach's cantatas with Richard D. P. Jones, BWV 53 appears amongst the spurious cantatas. In that Appendix, the entry for 'composer' is listed as Melchior Hoffmann, accompanied by a question mark.

According to Johann Nikolaus Forkel, the aria was composed by a young Bach, which would mean around the first decade of the 18th century. Philipp Spitta, in his multi-volume Bach biography in the second half of the 19th century, thought that Bach wrote the aria in his middle Leipzig period, that is around the middle of the 1723–1750 period, when he would also have written other chamber cantatas for private performance, most of them solo cantatas. According to Charles Sanford Terry, Bach composed the aria between 1723 and 1734. Biographers in the late 19th and early 20th century attributing the work to Bach include Bitter and Schweitzer. In 1950, Wolfgang Schmieder listed the aria as No. 53 in the first edition of the Bach-Werke-Verzeichnis (BWV).

In 1761, Johann Gottlob Immanuel Breitkopf offered manuscript copies of the aria in a catalogue printed for the Michaelmas fair in Leipzig. This catalogue does not name the composer. Johann Kirnberger added this copy to the Amalienbibliothek – the library of his employer Princess Anna Amalia of Prussia. Wilhelm Rust's edition of Schlage doch, gewünschte Stunde, as Cantata No. 53 in Vol. 12.2 of the Bach-Gesellschaft Ausgabe (BGA), published in 1863, was based on the Amalienbibliothek copy.

The date of the first performance is unknown. The cantata was performed in the Gewandhaus in Leipzig in 1867 and 1873. Martin Elste's history of Bach performances notes that between 1904 and 1907 in Germany, the most performed work was the St Matthew Passion (49 times), with second place taken by BWV 53 (20 times). The Bach-Jahrbuch of 1906 lists 20 public performances of Schlage doch, gewünschte Stunde, in various European cities, in the period from late 1904 to early 1907, which makes it, among the cantatas listed for that period, the most often performed; by the 1930s, Actus tragicus (BWV 106) became the most often performed cantata. Albert Schweitzer in 1935 called Schlage doch, gewünschte Stunde "[t]he best known of the solo cantatas for alto".

While current Bach scholarship has ruled out Bach as its possible composer, there is no clear consensus that Hoffmann should be confirmed as the composer of the piece. In the Bach-Jahrbuch of 1955 (published 1956), Karl Anton described the aria as being extracted from a multi-movement cantata which originated in the circle around Hoffmann. A year later, Dürr confirmed that BWV 53 was likely composed by Hoffmann. In 1994 the musicologist Peter Wollny conjectured that the aria BWV 53 might have been part of the funeral music by Hoffmann, commissioned for the memorial service at Halle on 1 May 1713, to mark the death of Frederick I of Prussia in February 1713. In the 1998 revision of the BWV, by Dürr and Yoshitake Kobayashi, Schlage doch, gewünschte Stunde was moved to the second Anhang, that is the Anhang of works doubtfully attributed to Bach, naming Hoffmann as its possible composer. If composed by Hoffmann, it must have originated from around the first decade of the 18th century: Hoffmann died in October 1715, ten years after becoming organist and director musices (music director) of the Neukirche in Leipzig.

Many modern full scores or vocal scores, such as the editions of Breitkopf & Härtel and Eulenburg, name the composer of "Schlage doch, gewünschte Stunde" as "M. Hoffmann" or "Melchior Hoffmann".

== Text ==
The author of the text is unknown. It is sometimes attributed to Salomon Franck; Spitta believed that Franck's style can be recognized in the text.

As the work was likely composed for a funeral service, the text reflects the hour of death as desired. Translations have included "Haste to strike, oh longed for hour", "Strike my hour, so long awaited", and "Strike then thou, O blessed hour". The title of the cantata is rendered In English as "Strike, O Bell" in the Oxford Orchestral Series, as "Strike thou ear" in the edition of Novello & Co and as "Sound your knell" in the editions of Breitkopf & Härtel and Augener & Co.

In a middle section, the angels are asked to open heavenly meadows, to see Jesus soon ("Kommt, ihr Engel, … Öffnet mir die Himmelsauen, meinen Jesum bald zu schauen").

The German text of the aria and its English translation by Lucy Broadwood are as follows:

Schlage doch, gewünschte Stunde
brich doch an, du schöner Tag!
Kommt, ihr Engel, auf mich zu,
öffnet mir die Himmelsauen,
meinen Jesum bald zu schauen
in vergnügter Seelenruh'!
Ich begehr' von Herzensgrunde,
nur den letzten Stundenschlag.

—Salomon Franck?
Translation:

Sound your knell, blest hour of parting,
Quickly dawn o happy day!
Angels! haste to my release!
Waft me to the realms supernal,
Where in Jesu's arms eternal
I shall rest in perfect peace.
Let me hear the last hour tolling,
That shall call my soul away.

—Lucy Broadwood

== Music and scoring ==
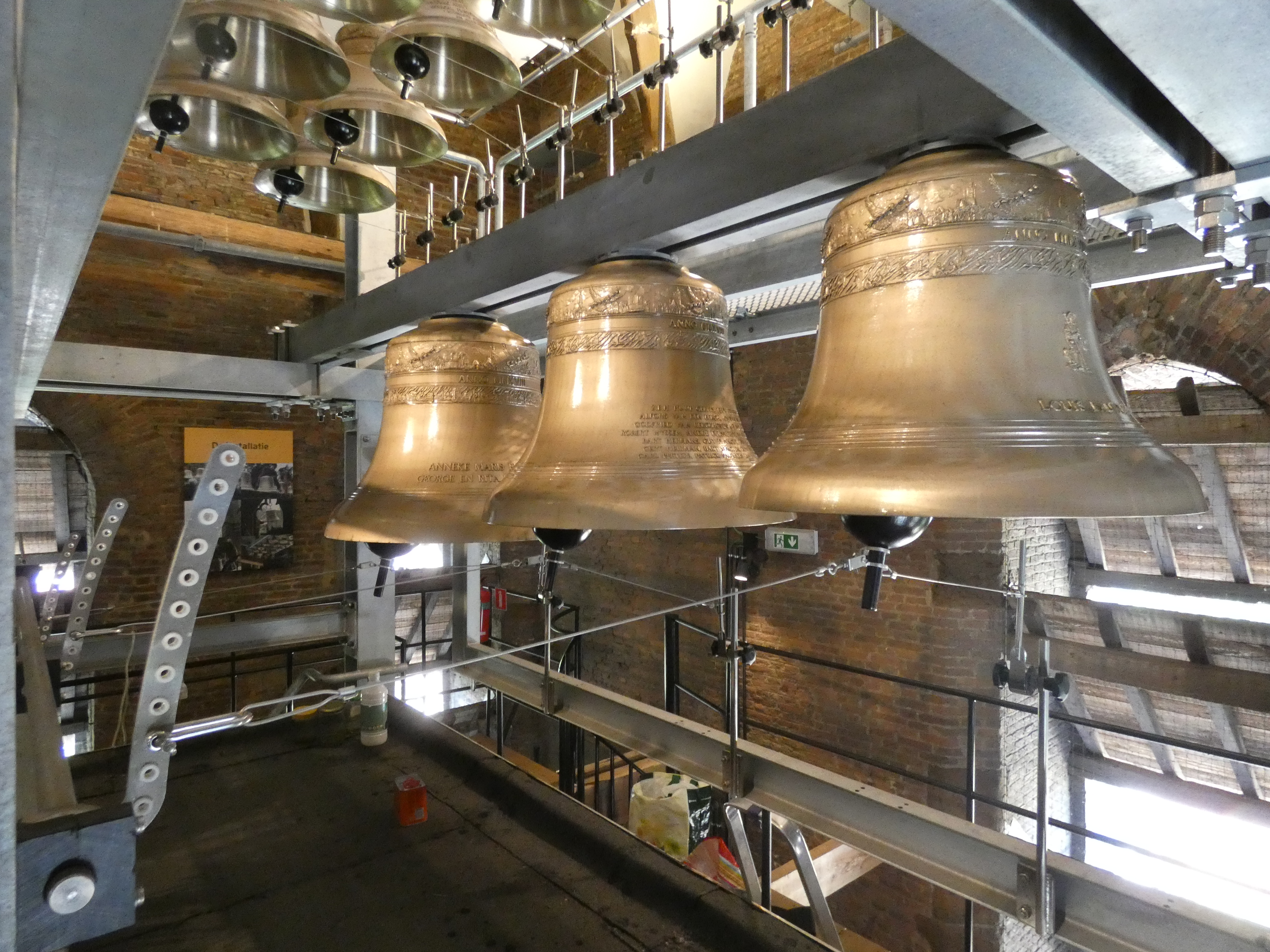
A carillon operated by a keyboard in Aarschot, Flanders, Belgium

The aria is composed in the key of E major and has a time signature of 3/2. It is scored for alto, two bells (respectively playing E and B), two violins, viola, and continuo (cello, organ). It is the oldest known composition in which bells are used as a musical instrument. According to musicologist Jeremy Montagu, it is possible that originally the bells might have been activated by the manuals or pedals in the organ register. In modern editions the bells sound as the E above middle C and the B as a fifth higher; the marking Campanella could signify bells in the treble range, as marked, or in the tenor or bass register one or two octaves below. The aria could not have been performed using conventional church bells, because of their size and the problem of coordinating players in the church and the belfry.

When Bach redesigned the organ of the Blasius church in Mühlhausen in 1708, he added a novelty: a register with bells (chimes) in the pedalboard. This mechanism—a Glockenspiel in German—was one of Bach's own devising and constructed in collaboration with the organ-builder Johann Friedrich Wender, who had previously assisted Bach on a similar project in Arnstadt.

According to W. Gillies Whittaker, the musical style of the cantata is "somewhat unusual", with questionable scoring for the violas. He states, however, that the principal theme "is so lovely and the charm of the whole so great that one questions whether any other composer of the day could have written it". In the aria, the tolling bells and continuo play in concert, echoed in the bell-like accompaniment of the crotchets in the violins. The Campanella scoring for the two bells was originally notated in the bass clef with the standard conventions for transposing instruments (so that B and E are scored as D and G respectively). No clear indication is given of the pitch of bells (high or deep).

The aria is characterized by an obbligato bell duet. Clifford Bartlett calls the bell knell "memorable and powerful". Simon Crouch notes that "some of [the aria's] thematic material is suggestive of Bach but the accompanying bells would be unique amongst Bach's surviving output". Forkel considers the usage of bells of doubtful taste.

== Recordings ==
External audio
- BWV 53 sung by Hilde Rössel-Majdan
- BWV 53 sung by Charles Humphries

The work was first recorded by Emmi Leisner in 1926; this was the first time a cantata credited to Bach was recorded. in 1999 the discographer Martin Elste singled out the recordings of Leisner and of Hildegard Hennecke, conducted by August Wenzinger in 1951, as being noteworthy.

In the table below, voice types in the third column adopt the terminology as rendered on the issued recording.

Significant recordings
Year	Singer	Voice type	Instrumental	Conductor
1926	Emmi Leisner	alto	Berlin State Opera Orchestra	
1936	Lina Falk	contralto	String orchestra & bells	Alexandre Eugène Cellier
1951	Hildegard Hennecke	alto	Schola Cantorum Basiliensis	August Wenzinger
1952	Hilde Rössel-Majdan	contralto	Vienna State Opera Orchestra	Hermann Scherchen
1958	Helen Watts	contralto	Philomusica of London	Thurston Dart
1963	Claudia Hellmann	alto	Pforzheim Chamber Orchestra	Fritz Werner
1964	Maureen Forrester	alto	I Solisti di Zagreb	Antonio Janigro
1984	Shirley Love	mezzo-soprano	Amor Artis	Johannes Somary
1987	René Jacobs	countertenor	Ensemble 415	Chiara Banchini
1993	Jochen Kowalski	altus	Academy of St Martin in the Fields	Kenneth Sillito
1998	Robin Blaze	countertenor	The Parley of Instruments	Peter Holman
2000	Guillemette Laurens	mezzo-soprano	I Barocchisti	Diego Fasolis
2000	Carlos Mena	countertenor	Ricercar Consort	Philippe Pierlot
2001	Daniel Taylor	countertenor	Theatre of Early Music	Daniel Taylor
2001	Gérard Lesne	alto	Il Seminario Musicale	Patrick Cohën-Akenine
2004	Marianne Beate Kielland	mezzo-soprano	Cologne Chamber Orchestra	Helmut Müller-Brühl
2011	Andreas Scholl	countertenor	Kammerorchester Basel	Julia Schröder
2012	Charles Humphries	countertenor	Kontrabande	Charles Humphries
2012	Damien Guillon	alto	il Gardellino	Marcel Ponseele
2015	Robin Blaze	alto	Bach Collegium Japan	Masaaki Suzuki
2017	Bejun Mehta	countertenor	Akademie für Alte Musik Berlin	Forck

== Ballet version ==
In 1992 the choreographer Mark Morris set BWV 53 as a pas de deux for a female and male dancer. It was titled Beautiful Day in explicit reference to Morris's 1985 pas de deux One Charming Night (to music of Henry Purcell). Morris's biographer, Joan Acolella, described "Beautiful Day" as one of his most sublime dances—"intimate" with no vestiges of the perversity of the 1985 piece. In a review in The New York Times, the critic Jack Anderson felt however that the piece was "choreographically rigid" with too much adherence to the musical score.
