= Meine Seel erhebt den Herren, BWV 10 =

Church cantata by Johann Sebastian Bach

Meine Seel erhebt den Herren
- BWV 10
- Chorale cantata by J. S. Bach
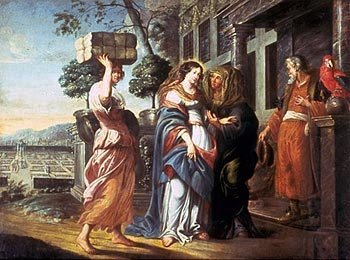
- Heimsuchung, occasion of the song of praise, Rubens school, Unionskirche, Idstein
- Occasion: Visitation
- Bible text: Luke 1:46–55 (partly paraphrased)
- Based on: "Meine Seele erhebt den Herren" (German Magnificat) by Martin Luther
- Performed: 2 July 1724; 302 years ago: Leipzig
- Movements: 7
- Vocal: SATB choir and soloists
- Instrumental: Trumpet; 2 oboes; 2 violins; viola; continuo

In 1724 Johann Sebastian Bach composed the church cantata Meine Seel erhebt den Herren, BWV 10, (Note: "BWV" is Bach-Werke-Verzeichnis, a thematic catalogue of Bach's works.) as part of his second cantata cycle. Taken from Martin Luther's German translation of the Magnificat canticle ("Meine Seele erhebt den Herren"), the title translates as "My soul magnifies the Lord". Also known as Bach's German Magnificat, the work follows his chorale cantata format.

Bach composed Meine Seel erhebt den Herren for the Feast of the Visitation (2 July), which commemorates Mary's visit to Elizabeth as narrated in the Gospel of Luke, 1st chapter, verses 39 to 56. In that narrative the words of the Magnificat, Luke 1:46–55, are spoken by Mary. Traditionally, Luther's translation of the biblical text is sung to a German variant of the tonus peregrinus or ninth psalm tone, concluding with a doxology, translated from the Gloria Patri, on the same tune. Bach based his BWV 10 cantata on Luther's German Magnificat and its traditional setting, working text and melody into the composition as he had done with Lutheran hymns in other chorale cantatas.

By early July 1724 Bach was more than a month into his second year as Thomaskantor in Leipzig. BWV 10 is the fifth of 40 chorale cantatas he started that year. The outer movements of the cantata are set for mixed choir and an orchestra consisting of trumpet, two oboes, strings and continuo. Luther's translation of Luke 1:46–48 is the text of the first movement. The canticle's doxology is the text of the last movement. The five middle movements are a succession of arias and recitatives, with, between the fourth and sixth movement, a duet for alto and tenor. Soprano and bass each have one aria, and the two recitatives are sung by the tenor. The text of the arias and recitatives is paraphrased and expanded from Luke 1:49–53 and 55. The text of the duet is Luther's translation of Luke 1:54. The melody associated with Luther's German Magnificat appears in movements 1, 5 and 7.

The music of two of the cantata's movements was published in the 18th century: an organ transcription of the duet was published around 1748 as one of the Schübler Chorales, and the closing chorale was included in C. P. E. Bach's 1780s collection of his father's four-part chorales. The entire cantata was published in the first volume of the 19th-century first complete edition of Bach's works. In 20th- and 21st-century concert and recording practice the cantata is often combined with other German-language cantatas, but also several times with settings of the Latin Magnificat, by Bach and other composers.

== Background ==
Late May 1723 Bach took office as Thomaskantor (Kantor at St. Thomas) and director musices (music director) in Leipzig. He remained in that office until his death in 1750. From the first Sunday after Trinity in 1723, that year falling on 30 May, to Trinity Sunday of the next year he presented a series of church cantatas known as his first cantata cycle. The cantatas of that cycle were often based on music he had composed before his Leipzig period. From the first Sunday after Trinity in 1724, that year falling on 11 June, he started his second cantata cycle with forty chorale cantatas composed to new librettos. Each of these librettos was based on the text of a known chorale, usually a Lutheran hymn, the tune of which was adopted by Bach in his setting.

The first weeks of the post Trinitatem (after Trinity) season included the Feast of John the Baptist (24 June) and the Feast of the Visitation (2 July). In Bach's time Protestant Leipzig observed three Marian feasts requiring figural music. In the context of the liturgical year Visitation was the third of such occasions, after Purification, falling in the period of the Sundays after Epiphany, and Annunciation, falling around Easter. Several traditions regarding these Marian feasts, such as the selection of readings for the church services, were continued from the period before Leipzig had adopted Lutheranism. Cantatas with a text in the native language had, since the early 18th century, become the dominant genre of figural music in Reformed German regions. Practices rooted in older traditions included the occasional performance of a Latin Magnificat on occasions such as Marian Feasts or Christmas.

Meine Seel erhebt den Herren, BWV 10, for Visitation, is the fifth chorale cantata Bach presented in 1724. Its text is based on Luther's German translation of the Magnificat. The singing tune associated with that version of the Magnificat, a German variant of the tonus peregrinus, appears in Bach's composition.

=== Readings, text and tune ===
The prescribed readings for the feast day were from the Book of Isaiah, the prophecy of the Messiah (Isaiah 11:1–5), and from the Gospel of Luke the narration of Mary's visit to Elizabeth, which includes her song of praise, the Magnificat (Luke 1:39–56). This gospel reading is a biblical episode that is often represented in art, especially in music where it has become a traditional part of Vesper services. In Bach's time, the German Magnificat was regularly sung in Leipzig in vespers in a four-part setting of the ninth psalm tone (tonus peregrinus) by Johann Hermann Schein. Different from the other chorale cantatas of the cycle, the base for text and music is not a chorale, but the German Magnificat. It is a canticle, a biblical song in prose concluded by the traditional doxology. The text is based on Luther's translation of the biblical song to German in the Luther Bible, and on the doxology.

In the format of the chorale cantata cycle, an unknown librettist retained some parts of Luther's wording, while he paraphrased other passages for recitatives and arias. He used the original verses 46–48 for the first movement, verse 54 for the fifth movement, and the doxology for the seventh movement. He paraphrased verse 49 for the second movement, verses 50–51 for the third, verses 52–53 for the fourth, and verse 55 for the sixth movement, the latter expanded by a reference to the birth of Jesus.

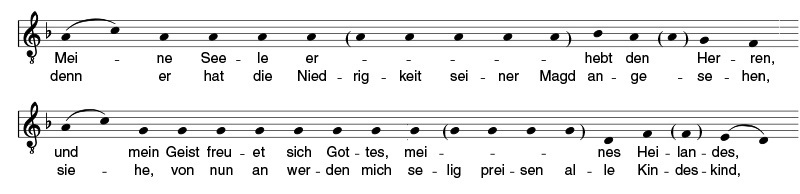
The text of the first two verses with the music of the Ninth psalm tone

Bach's music is based on the traditional ninth psalm tone which was familiar to the Leipzig congregation.

=== Magnificats and Visitation cantatas in Bach's Leipzig ===
Meine Seele rühmt und preist, BWV 189
First movement

Fourth movement (Recitative) and fifth movement (Aria)
Sung by Max Meili; conducted by Curt Sachs; L'anthologie sonore No. 23 (1935)

Doxology of Bach's Latin Magnificat
Gloria Patri part of BWV 243
Performed by The Tudor Consort (2006)

One of Bach's predecessors as director musices of the Neukirche in Leipzig was Melchior Hoffmann. Around 1707 he composed a German Magnificat in A minor based on Luther's German translation of the Magnificat. The portfolio of performance parts of this composition was updated until well into Bach's time in Leipzig. The work, known as Kleines Magnificat (Little Magnificat), was for some time attributed to Bach, but later listed as spurious in the BWV catalogue (BWV Anh. 21 / Anh. III 168‑>). BWV 189, a Visitation cantata on a libretto that paraphrases the text of the Magnificat canticle, also seems rather to have been composed by Hoffmann than by Bach, to whom this work used to be attributed.

Johann Kuhnau, Bach's predecessor as Thomaskantor, composed a Latin Magnificat in two versions: one version with only the Latin text of the Magnificat for Marian feasts such as Visitation, and another version expanded with four German and Latin laudes relating to Christmas. When Bach presented his Latin Magnificat in 1723 (E♭ major version, BWV 243a) it had the same expandable format: without laudes for Visitation, and with four laudes, on the same text as Kuhnau's, for Christmas. Another composition presented by Bach at that year's feast of the Visitation was Herz und Mund und Tat und Leben, BWV 147, an expanded version of an Advent cantata composed before his Leipzig period (BWV 147a).

A repeat performance of BWV 243a may have accompanied the first performance of BWV 10 on 2 July 1724. The libretto of the cantata performed in Leipzig at the feast of the Visitation of 1725 survives. Maria Aurora von Königsmarck is the possible author of this Magnificat paraphrase. Around a decade before the libretto was reprinted in Leipzig it had already been set by Reinhard Keiser and Johann Mattheson. It is not known whether Bach set the libretto, neither which setting of the libretto was used for the 1725 Visitation feast in Leipzig. A year later Bach performed Der Herr wird ein Neues im Lande, JLB 13, a Visitation cantata by his second cousin Johann Ludwig Bach. Picander's libretto for the Visitation cantata of 1728 may have been set as part of Bach's fourth cantata cycle: the libretto, surviving without music, starts with a dictum quoted from Luther's German translation of Luke 1:46–47.

Around 1733 Bach transposed his Latin Magnificat to D major (BWV 243). Besides transposing, he also applied a few modifications: for instance in the movement that has Luke 1:54 as text he replaced the trumpet as performer of the cantus firmus by two oboes. Around a decade later Bach prepared two Latin Magnificats by other composers for performance (BWV 1082, BWV Anh. 30). Probably around the same time Bach performed BWV 10 again.

Several characteristics of the Magnificats and Visitation cantatas of the first half of the 18th century are combined in Bach's German Magnificat: it uses text of Luther's translation of the Magnificat, like BWV Anh. 21 and Picander's 1728 libretto, and it uses text paraphrased from the Magnificat like BWV 189 and the 1725 Visitation cantata. Like the Meiningen libretto used for JLB 13 the cantata not only starts with a dictum but also has a second dictum, directly quoted from Luther's translation of the New Testament, near the middle of the cantata (movement 4, "Meine Seele erhebt den Herrn", in Johann Ludwig's cantata, and movement 5, "Er denket der Barmherzigkeit" in BWV 10). This characteristic sets BWV 10 apart from Bach's other chorale cantatas, which as a rule contained quotes from Lutheran hymns, not from biblical prose.

Some musical similarities between BWV 10 and Bach's Latin Magnificat have been described. Philipp Spitta sees a similar musical treatment at the end of the respective movements based on the Luke 1:51 text, which are the central "Fecit potentiam" movement of the Latin Magnificat and the third "Des Höchsten Güt und Treu" movement of BWV 10. The movements with respectively the German and Latin text of Luke 1:54 present the tonus peregrinus melody associated with Luther's German Magnificat as a cantus firmus played by wind instruments. The "Suscepit Israel" movement of the BWV 243a version of the Latin Magnificat has that cantus firmus performed by a trumpet. In the later BWV 243 version of the same movement the trumpet has been replaced by two oboes. In the corresponding movement of BWV 10 ("Er denket der Barmherzigkeit") the cantus firmus is performed by the trumpet and the two oboes. Masaaki Suzuki assumes that this should be interpreted as trumpet for the original 1724 version, replaced by two oboes in the 1740s revival version, the same modification that occurred to the related movement of the Latin Magnificat.

=== Place of BWV 10 in Bach's chorale cantata cycle ===
Bach followed a specific structure for most of the cantatas of his chorale cantata cycle, especially the 40 he presented consecutively from the first Sunday after Trinity of 1724 to Palm Sunday of 1725. In this chorale cantata format he retained the original text and melody of the chorale on which the cantata was based in the outer stanzas, typically treating the first as a chorale fantasia and the last as a four-part chorale setting, while the inner stanzas were reworded by a librettist as the basis for recitatives and arias, usually with music independent of the chorale tune.

19th-century Bach scholars were largely unaware of the composition history of the chorale cantatas, and how Bach conceived the cycle of these cantatas:

- When Alfred Dörffel listed Bach's chorale cantatas as a cycle in 1878 he ranged Meine Seel erhebt den Herren between the cantata for the sixth Sunday after Trinity (BWV 9) and the one for the seventh Sunday after Trinity (BWV 107).
- Spitta described Bach's chorale cantatas rather as a group than as a cycle, and thought that most of them, including BWV 10, were not composed before the mid-1730s.

Details about the history, organisation and coherence of the cycle were only elucidated in the second half of the 20th century, by scholars such as Alfred Dürr. According to this research the chronology of the first six chorale cantatas Bach presented in 1724 is updated as follows (K numbers of the first edition of the chronological Zwang catalogue are given between brackets):

1. 11 June, Trinity I: O Ewigkeit, du Donnerwort, BWV 20 (K 74)
2. 18 June, Trinity II: Ach Gott, vom Himmel sieh darein, BWV 2 (K 75)
3. 24 June, St. John's Day: Christ unser Herr zum Jordan kam, BWV 7 (K 76)
4. 25 June, Trinity III: Ach Herr, mich armen Sünder, BWV 135 (K 77)
5. 2 July, Visitation (in 1724 coinciding with Trinity IV): Meine Seel erhebt den Herren, BWV 10 (K 78)
6. 9 July, Trinity V: Wer nur den lieben Gott läßt walten, BWV 93 (K 79)

The strong coherence between the first four cantatas of this series, as belonging to the same set, has been described for instance by Christoph Wolff. The first of these cantatas begins with a chorale fantasia in the form of a French overture, with the soprano singing the cantus firmus of the chorale. The opening movement of the cantata for the next Sunday is in motet style, with the cantus firmus sung by the alto. For the next occasion, St. John's Day, Bach wrote a cantata with an opening movement in the style of an Italian violin concerto, in which the cantus firmus was given to the tenor. The next day followed a cantata opening with a movement in vocal and instrumental counterpoint with the cantus firmus sung by the bass. Conductor John Eliot Gardiner writes about these first four cantatas of the chorale cantata cycle: "Together they make a fascinating and contrasted portfolio of choral[e] fantasia openings."

Libretto publications in Bach's Leipzig more than once grouped the first four cantatas after Trinity, or started a new publication with the cantata for the fifth occasion after Trinity. In 1724 that fifth occasion was Visitation, for which Bach composed Meine Seel erhebt den Herren. It is not a typical second cycle chorale cantata in the sense that it was based on a prose text (lacking the metre of a hymn text) and a Gregorian chant melody (lacking a musical metre). Further, the unmodified canticle text and chant melody not only appeared in the outer movements but also in one of the middle movements (the duet, No. 5). The text of the final movement was a generic doxology which could be appended to any religious chant, while other chorale cantatas commonly ended with a text that only appeared in the hymn from which it was quoted. BWV 125, Bach's chorale cantata for Purification based on the Canticle of Simeon (Luke 2:29–32), does not have these exceptions to the second cycle format: it is based on Luther's versified paraphrase of the canticle and its metrical hymn melody. Nonetheless, Dürr writes about BWV 10 (here rendered in Richard D. P. Jones' translation): "if ever a work deserved the description 'chorale cantata' it is this, for it is based on a genuine (Gregorian) chorale melody".

In 1724 the feast of the Visitation fell on the fourth Sunday after Trinity, thus the next cantata Bach composed was a chorale cantata for the fifth Sunday after Trinity. Bach did apparently not compose a cantata for the sixth Sunday after Trinity in 1724 while absent from Leipzig. Bach's second year in Leipzig passed without composing a chorale cantata specifically for the fourth Sunday after Trinity. He composed one for this occasion in 1732, Ich ruf zu dir, Herr Jesu Christ, BWV 177, one of the later additions to the chorale cantata cycle. Also for Trinity VI Bach composed a chorale cantata at a later date (BWV 9).

== Music ==
=== Structure and scoring ===
Bach structured the cantata in seven movements. The first and last are set for four-part choir, and are based on the chant melody. They frame recitatives, arias and a duet of the soloists: (soprano (S), alto (A), tenor (T) and bass (B)). The orchestra of typical baroque instruments is listed on the folder containing the original parts as follows: "Festo Visitationis | Mariae | Meine Seel erhebt den Herren. | â | 4. Voc: | Tromba. | 2. Hautbois. | 2. Violini. | Viola | e | Continuo | di Sigl. | J. S. Bach." The "tromba" or trumpet is only used to highlight the cantus firmus and may have been a tromba da tirarsi, a slide trumpet. Alfred Dürr gives the duration of the piece as 23 minutes.

In the following table of the movements, the column "text" links to the World English Bible, adding "Luther" for the movements kept in his translation, and "anon." for paraphrased and expanded versions of the unknown librettist.

Movements of Meine Seel erhebt den Herren, BWV 10
No.	Title	Text	Type	Voices	Instruments	Key	Time
1	Meine Seel erhebt den Herren	Luke 1:46–48, Luther	Chorale fantasia	SATB	'Tromba', 2 Oboes, strings, bc.	G minor	common time
2	Herr, der du stark und mächtig bist	Luke 1:49, anon.	Aria	S	2 Oboes (unis.), strings, bc.	B♭ major	common time
3	Des Höchsten Güt und Treu	Luke 1:50–51, anon.	Recitative	T	bc.		common time
4	Gewaltige stößt Gott vom Stuhl	Luke 1:52–53, anon.	Aria	B	bc.	F major	common time
5	Er denket der Barmherzigkeit	Luke 1:54, Luther	duet, chorale	A T	Tromba & both oboes unis., bc.	D minor	6/8
6	Was Gott den Vätern alter Zeiten	Luke 1:55, anon.	Accompagnato	T	strings, bc		common time
7	Lob und Preis sei Gott dem Vater	translation of Gloria Patri	Chorale	SATB	Tromba. 2 oboes, strings, bc	G minor	common time

=== Movements ===
==== 1 ====
The opening chorale fantasia is marked vivace (lively). Bach begins the movement with an instrumental introduction that is unrelated to the psalm tone. It is a trio of the violins and the continuo, with the oboes doubling the violin, and the viola filling the harmony. The main motif stands for joy and is set in "rhythmical propulsion".

The chorus enters after 12 measures with "Meine Seel erhebt den Herren" (My soul magnifies the Lord). The cantus firmus is in the soprano, doubled by a trumpet, whereas the lower voices add free polyphony on motifs from the introduction. Bach treats the second verse similarly, but with the third verse, "Denn er hat seine elende Magd angesehen" (for he has looked at the humble state of his handmaid), the cantus firmus appears in the alto. Certain words, such as "freuet" (rejoice) and "selig preisen" (call me blessed) are adorned with melismas. The movement is concluded by a vocal setting without cantus firmus embedded in the music of the introduction, framing the movement.

==== 2 ====
The soprano aria "Herr, der du stark und mächtig bist" (Lord, you who are strong and mighty) is a concerto of the voice and the oboes, accompanied by the strings. It is a da capo aria, expressing praise for God's works in the first section, while the more reticent middle section covers thankfulness for his help in times of distress. It is the first soprano aria in the chorale cantata cycle.

==== 3 ====
The recitative "Des Höchsten Güt und Treu" (The goodness and love of the Highest) ends on an arioso. The thought that God "also uses force with His arm" is expressed with emphasis, and the final "will be scattered like straw by His hand" is an extended coloratura. Spitta compares the end of this movement with the end of the 7th movement of Bach's Latin Magnificat: textually both movements treat the same part of the Magnificat (the end of Luke 1:51), and, although the other movement is set for five-part chorus and tutti orchestra, he considers the closure of this recitative of the German Magnificat cantata "equally picturesque".

==== 4 ====
The following aria "Gewaltige stößt Gott vom Stuhl" (The mighty God casts from their thrones) is set for bass and continuo. A descending bass line in the continuo over two octaves illustrates the fall, which the voice also suggests in descending phrases. The second aspect of the text, the exaltation of the humble, is shown by rising figures, and the final emptiness ("bloß und leer", bare and empty) by pauses.

==== 5 ====
In the fifth movement, "Er denket der Barmherzigkeit" (He remembers his mercy), the text returns to the original German Magnificat, and the music to the psalm tone. It is played by oboes and trumpet as the cantus firmus, while alto and tenor sing in imitation. Klaus Hofmann interprets the bass line of "emphatic downward semitone intervals" as "sighs of divine mercy". The voices often sing in parallel thirds and sixths, as they do also in the corresponding movement from Bach's Latin Magnificat, the duet Et misericordia (And your compassion), in both cases expressing mildness and compassion.

==== 6 ====
The recitative for tenor, "Was Gott den Vätern alter Zeiten" (What God, in times past, to our forefathers), referring to God's promise, begins secco. Starting with the added words "Sein Same mußte sich so sehr wie Sand am Meer und Stern am Firmament ausbreiten, der Heiland ward geboren" (His seed must be scattered as plentifully as sand on the shore and as stars in the firmament, the Savior was born), the lively chords of the added strings emphasize the importance of the promise kept.

==== 7 ====
In the final movement, the two verses of the doxology are set on the psalm tone for four parts, with all instruments playing colla parte. Wind instruments and violin I join the soprano part. The setting is mostly in homophony, but turns to polyphony for the final "von Ewigkeit zu Ewigkeit" (for ever and ever).

== Manuscripts and editions ==
Both Bach's autograph score and the parts used for the cantata's first performance survive. The score, previously owned by Wilhelm Friedemann Bach, Philipp Spitta and Paul Wittgenstein, among others, came in the possession of the Library of Congress in 1948. The original parts remained in Leipzig, where they were entrusted to the Bach Archive in the 20th century.

BWV 648 is a chorale prelude for organ transcribed from the cantata's fifth movement. It was first published around 1748 as fourth of the Schübler Chorales. The music of the cantata's closing movement is included in the Dietel collection, a 1730s manuscript containing 149 of Bach's four-part chorales. C. P. E. Bach published the same music of BWV 10 as No. 357 in Part IV of his 1780s collected edition of four-part chorales by his father.

The entire cantata was published in 1851 in the first volume of the Bach-Gesellschaft Ausgabe (BGA), edited by Moritz Hauptmann. The New Bach Edition (Neue Bach-Ausgabe, NBA) published the score in 1995, edited by Uwe Wolf, with the critical commentary published the same year.

The cantata was also published with a singable English version of the text:

- My soul doth magnify the Lord – English version by E. H. Thorne and G. W. Daisley
- Magnify the Lord, my soul – critical edition by Christoph Großpietsch, published by Carus.
- Now my soul exalts the Lord – based on the NBA edition for the score.

== Concert performances and recordings ==
Karl Richter programmed BWV 10 along Bruckner's 150th Psalm at his first concert in Ottobeuren in 1957. In the 1960s, Paul Steinitz's and Fritz Werner's recordings of the cantata were released on LPs which also featured another German cantata by Bach. On Richter's 1978 LP release BWV 10 was also combined with other German Bach cantatas. Karl Münchinger's 1968 recording and Hans-Joachim Rotzsch's 1978 recording of BWV 10 were issued on LPs which included their respective performances of Bach's Latin Magnificat. Also Michael Gielen's concert at the 1991 Bodenseefestival combined Bach's German and Latin Magnificat. Teldec's, Hänssler's, Koopman's, Brilliant Classics' and Suzuki's complete Bach cantata recordings include a recording of BWV 10.

Roland Büchner's 2000 recording, with the Regensburger Domspatzen, combined Bach's German Magnificat with the 1723 Christmas version of his Latin Magnificat (BWV 243a). Gardiner's Bach Cantata Pilgrimage featured BWV 10 in a concert recorded in 2000. Ton Koopman's concert at the 2003 Leipzig Bach Festival combined BWV 10 with the Christmas versions of Bach's and Kuhnau's Magnificat, thus allowing to compare similar works of two consecutive Thomaskantors. Sigiswald Kuijken recorded BWV 10 for his Cantatas for the Complete Liturgical Year series in 2007. The same year, a concert at the Indiana University combined Bach's Meine Seel erhebt den Herren cantata with a 2005 Magnificat by Sven-David Sandström.

Gustav Leonhardt, Pieter-Jan Leusink and Ton Koopman used period instruments for their complete Bach cantata recordings. Also Musica Florea, the orchestra on Büchner's recording, performs on historic instruments.

Instrumental groups playing period instruments in historically informed performances are highlighted green under the header "Instr.".

Recordings of Meine Seel erhebt den Herren, BWV 10, issued on LP, CD, SACD and/or DVD
Title	Conductor / Choir / Orchestra	Soloists	Label	Year	Instr.
Johann Sebastian Bach: Cantatas 10, 47; BWV 241: Sanctus in D major (LP) Johann Sebastian Bach: Cantata 10 – Cantata 47 (CD)	Paul Steinitz London Bach Society English Chamber Orchestra	Sally Le Sage; Shirley Minty; Nigel Rogers; Neil Howlett	Oryx (LP); Lyrichord (CD)	1965 (LP); 2008 (CD)	
J-S Bach: Les grandes cantates. Vol. 1 (LP) J.S. Bach – Fritz Werner: Cantatas. Vol. 2 (CD)	Fritz Werner Heinrich-Schütz-Chor Heilbronn Pforzheim Chamber Orchestra	Maria Friesenhausen; Emmy Lisken; Georg Jelden; Barry McDaniel	Erato (LP); Warner Classics (CD)	1966 (LP); 2004 (CD)	
Bach: Magnificat in D major – Cantata No. 10 (LP) The Decca Sound, CD 36	Karl Münchinger Wiener Akademiechor Stuttgarter Kammerorchester	Elly Ameling; Helen Watts; Werner Krenn; Marius Rintzler	Decca	1969 (LP); 2011 (CD)	
Joh:Sebas:Bach: Das Kantatenwerk (Complete Cantatas), Vol. 3	Gustav Leonhardt Choir of King's College Leonhardt-Consort	(unnamed boy soprano); Paul Esswood; Kurt Equiluz; Max van Egmond	Das Alte Werk (Teldec)	1972 (LP); 1985 (CD)	Period
Kantaten: Meine Seel' erhebt den Herren, BWV 10 – Ach Herr, mich armen Sünder, BWV 135 – Ein ungefärbt Gemüte, BWV 24 (LP) Bach Cantatas Vol. 3: Ascension Day – Whitsun – Trinity (CD)	Karl Richter Münchener Bach-Chor Münchener Bach-Orchester	Edith Mathis; Anna Reynolds; Peter Schreier; Kurt Moll	Archiv Produktion	1976 (LP); 1993 (CD)	
Johann Sebastian Bach: Magnificat D-dur – Meine Seel erhebt den Herren (LP) Bach Kantaten: Magnificat D-dur – Meine Seel erhebt den Herren (CD)	Hans-Joachim Rotzsch Thomanerchor Neues Bachisches Collegium Musicum	Mitsuko Shirai; Doris Soffel; Peter Schreier; Hermann Christian Polster	VEB-Eurodisc (LP); Berlin Classics (CD)	1979 (LP); 1996 (CD)	
Die Bach Kantate: BWV 10 Meine Seel erhebt den Herren – BWV 93 Wer nur den lieben Gott lässt walten (LP) Die Bach Kantate, Vol. 17 (CD)	Helmuth Rilling Gächinger Kantorei Bach-Collegium Stuttgart	Arleen Augér; Margit Neubauer; Aldo Baldin; Wolfgang Schöne	Claudius (LP); Hänssler (CD)	1979 (LP); 1985 (CD)	
Gielen-Edition: Johann Sebastian Bach Magnificat D-dur BWV 243 Kantate BWV 10 "Meine Seel' Erhebt den Herren"	Michael Gielen Anton-Webern-Chor SWF-Sinfonieorchester Baden-Baden	Christiane Oelze; Cornelia Kallisch; Christoph Prégardien; Anton Scharingere	Intercord	1991 (rec.); 1995 (CD)	
Bach: Complete Cantatas, Vol. 11	Ton Koopman Amsterdam Baroque Orchestra & Choir	Sibylla Rubens; Annette Markert; Christoph Prégardien; Klaus Mertens	Erato (later: Antoine Marchand)	1999 (rec.); 2001 (CD)	Period
J. S. Bach: Magnificat in E flat major BWV 243a – Cantata BWV 10	Roland Büchner Regensburger Domspatzen Musica Florea	Susanne Rydén; Drew Minter; Markus Brutscher; Peter Harvey	Pure; Classics	2000	Period
Bach Edition Vol. 20: Cantatas Vol. XI	Pieter Jan Leusink Holland Boys Choir Netherlands Bach Collegium	Ruth Holton; Sytse Buwalda; Knut Schoch; Bas Ramselaar	Brilliant Classics	2000	Period
Bach Cantatas Vol. 2: Paris/Zürich / For the 2nd Sunday after Trinity / For the 3rd Sunday after Trinity	John Eliot Gardiner Monteverdi Choir English Baroque Soloists	Lisa Larsson; Daniel Taylor; James Gilchrist; Stephen Varcoe	Soli Deo Gloria	2000	Period
J. S. Bach: Cantatas Vol. 23 (Cantatas from Leipzig 1724)	Masaaki Suzuki Bach Collegium Japan	Yukari Nonoshita; Matthew White; Makoto Sakurada; Peter Kooy	BIS	2002	Period
Bach - Kuhnau: Magnificat	Ton Koopman Amsterdam Baroque Orchestra & Choir	Deborah York; Bogna Bartosz; Jörg Dürmüller; Klaus Mertens	Naxos	2003 (rec.); 2004 (DVD)	Period
Johann Sebastian Bach: Cantatas BWV 20 - 2 - 10 (Cantatas for the Complete Liturgical Year Vol. 7)	Sigiswald Kuijken La Petite Bande	Siri Thornhill; Petra Noskaiová; Marcus Ullmann; Jan van der Crabben	Accent	2007 (rec.); 2008 (SACD)	Period

== Sources ==
By author or editor

- Bach, Johann Sebastian (c. 1748). "Meine Seele Erhebt den Herren, a 2 Clav. & Pedal". Sechs Chorale von verschiedener Art. Zella: Johann Georg Schübler. pp. 8–9. (first edition of BWV 648, Schübler Chorale No. 4: transcription of BWV 10's 5th movement as chorale prelude for organ)
- Bach, Carl Philipp Emmanuel (1787). Johann Sebastian Bachs Vierstimmige Choralgesänge (PDF). Vol. IV. Leipzig: Johann Gottlob Immanuel Breitkopf. pp. 167–218.
- Blanken, Christine (2015). "A Cantata-Text Cycle of 1728 from Nuremberg: a Preliminary Report on a Discovery relating to J. S. Bach's so-called 'Third Annual Cantata Cycle'" (PDF). Understanding Bach. 10. Bach Network UK: 9–30. ISSN 1750-3078.
- Dahn, Luke. "Sortable Index of the Chorales by J.S. Bach". lukedahn.net. Archived from the original on 25 September 2021.
- Dahn, Luke (2017). "BWV 10.7". bach-chorales.com.
- Dellal, Pamela (2012). "BWV 10 – Meine Seel erhebt den Herren". Emmanuel Music.
- Dürr, Alfred (1981). Die Kantaten von Johann Sebastian Bach (in German). Vol. 1 (4 ed.). Deutscher Taschenbuchverlag. ISBN 3-423-04080-7.
- Dürr, Alfred; Jones, Richard D. P. (2006). The Cantatas of J. S. Bach: With Their Librettos in German-English Parallel Text. Oxford University Press. ISBN 978-0-19-929776-4.
- Gardiner, John Eliot (2010). "Cantatas for the Second Sunday after Trinity / Basilique Saint-Denis, Paris" (PDF). Soli Deo Gloria. pp. 9–10.
- Glöckner, Andreas (1982). "Die Leipziger Neukirchenmusik und das 'Kleine Magnificat' BWV Anh. 21". In Schulze, Hans-Joachim; Wolff, Christoph (eds.). Bach-Jahrbuch 1982. Bach-Jahrbuch (in German). Vol. 68. Merseburger (for Neue Bachgesellschaft). pp. 97–102.
- Glöckner, Andreas (2003). "Bachs Es-Dur-Magnificat BWV 243a – eine genuine Weihnachtsmusik?". In Schulze, Hans-Joachim; Wolff, Christoph (eds.). Bach-Jahrbuch 2003. Bach-Jahrbuch (in German). Vol. 89. Merseburger (for Neue Bachgesellschaft). pp. 37–45. ISBN 9783374020324.
- Großpietsch, Christoph (2009). "Johann Sebastian Bach / Magnify the Lord, my soul / Visitation / BWV 10". Carus-Verlag.
- Hauptmann, Moritz (1851). "Cantate (Am Feste Mariae Heimsuchung): Meine Seel' erhebt den Herren – No. 10". Joh. Seb. Bach's Kirchenkantaten: Erster Band (Nos. 1–10). Bach-Gesellschaft Ausgabe (in German). Vol. I. Breitkopf & Härtel. pp. XV–XVII and XX (Preface), 275–303 (Score).
- Jenkins, Neil (2000). "Bach Magnificat in D & E flat BWV 243 & 243a" (PDF). Novello.
- Lundberg, Mattias (2013). "J. S. Bach's Meine Seele erhebt den Herren (BWV 10) in the Context of Other Uses of the Magnificat Text for the Feast of Visitatio Mariae" (PDF). Understanding Bach. 8. Bach Network UK: 9–31. ISSN 1750-3078.
- Oron, Aryeh (2014). "Cantata BWV 10: Meine Seel erhebt den Herren". Bach Cantatas Website.
- Peters, Mark A. (2012). "J. S. Bach's Meine Seel' erhebt den Herren (BWV 10) as Chorale Cantata and Magnificat Paraphrase". Bach: Journal of the Riemenschneider Bach Institute. 34 (1). Riemenschneider Bach Institute (Baldwin Wallace University): 29–64. ISSN 0005-3600. JSTOR 41640620.
- Pfau, Marc-Roderich (2008). "Ein unbekanntes Leipziger Kantatentextheft aus dem Jahr 1735: Neues zum Thema Bach und Stölzel" [An unknown Leipzig cantata text publication from the year 1735: News regarding Bach and Stölzel]. In Wollny, Peter (ed.). Bach-Jahrbuch 2008 [Bach Yearbook 2008]. Bach-Jahrbuch (in German). Vol. 94. Neue Bachgesellschaft. Leipzig: Evangelische Verlagsanstalt. pp. 99–122. doi:10.13141/bjb.v2008. ISBN 978-3-374-02668-5. ISSN 0084-7682.
- Rathey, Markus (2016). "A Female Voice: Mary in Bach's Magnificat Settings BWV 243 and 10". Bach's Major Vocal Works: Music, Drama, Liturgy. Yale University Press. pp. 8–34. ISBN 9780300219517.
- Rettinghaus, K. (2017). "Sankt-Peterburg (Sankt Petersburg), Rossijskaja nacional'naja biblioteka (National library): RUS-SPsc F. 446 Lwow A. F., Nr. 65". Bach Digital.
- Rizzuti, Alberto (2013). "One Verse, Two Settings, and Three Strange Youths" (PDF). Gli Spazi della Musica. 2 (2). University of Turin: 1–11. ISSN 2240-7944.
- Stölzel, Gottfried Heinrich (1740). "Melch. Hofmann". In Mattheson, Johann (ed.). Grundlage einer Ehren-Pforte (in German). Hamburg: Berlin, Kommissionsverlag von L. Liepmannssohn. pp. 117–119. Grundlage einer Ehren-Pforte (Mattheson, Johann) at Scores
- Wolf, Uwe (1995). "Bach, Johann Sebastian: Meine Seele erhebt den Herren, BWV 10". Kantaten zu Marienfesten II. New Bach Edition (in German). Vol. Series I: Cantatas, Vol. 28/2. Bärenreiter. pp. 67ff. (Critical Commentary), 131ff. (Score).
- Wolf, Uwe (2015). "Bach, Johann Sebastian / Now my soul exalts the Lord BWV 10 / Cantata for the Feast of Visitation B. V. M." Bärenreiter.
- Wolff, Christoph (2002). Johann Sebastian Bach: The Learned Musician. Oxford University Press. pp. 275–279. ISBN 978-0-393-32256-9.

By title as issued

- Bach, Johann Sebastian: Meine Seel' erhebt den Herren in G minor. Répertoire International des Sources Musicales. (RISM 000102323: description of US-Wc ML30.8b.B2 M4, Bach's autograph score of BWV 10)
- Bach, Johann Sebastian: Meine Seel' erhebt den Herren. Répertoire International des Sources Musicales. (RISM 200020894: description of D-LEb Thomana 10, Bach's performance parts of BWV 10)
- "Berlin, Staatsbibliothek zu Berlin – Preußischer Kulturbesitz: D-B Mus. ms. autogr. Hoffmann, M. 3 N". Bach Digital. 2017. (facsimile and description of the performance parts of the Kleine Magnificat)
- Hoffmann, Melchior: Magnificat in A minor. Répertoire International des Sources Musicales. (RISM 464000199: description of D-B Mus. ms. autogr. Hoffmann, M. 3 N, performance parts of the Kleine Magnificat)
- "Hoffmann, Melchior: Magnificat; S, orch; a-Moll; BWV Anh. 1:21/Anh. 3:168; TWV 1:1748". Berlin State Library. 2014. (facsimile of D-B Mus. ms. autogr. Hoffmann, M. 3 N, performance parts of the Kleine Magnificat)
- J.S. Bach - Cantatas, Vol.23 (BWV 10, 93, 178, 107) (CD). Åkersberga, Sweden: BIS. 2003. BIS-1331. Archived from the original on 9 July 2017. With English liner notes by Klaus Hofmann (pp. 6–11) and Masaaki Suzuki (p. 11)
- "Leipzig, Bach-Archiv Leipzig: D-LEb Thomana 10". Bach Digital. 2017. (facsimile and description of Bach's performance parts of BWV 10)
- "Leipzig, Stadtbibliothek Leipzig, Musikbibliothek: D-LEb Peters Ms. R 18 = Choralsammlung Dietel (Depositum im Bach-Archiv)". Bach Digital. 2017. (description of Dietel's collection of four-part chorales by Johann Sebastian Bach)
- "Magnificat in E flat major (first version) BWV 243a; BC E 13: Magnificat (The Visitation of Mary, 2 July)". Bach Digital. 2015. (BDW 303, with links to libretto and manuscript descriptions)
- "Meine Seel erhebt den Herren BWV 10; BC A 175: Chorale cantata (The Visitation of Mary, 2 July)". Bach Digital. 2017. (BDW 12, with links to libretto and manuscript descriptions)
- "Meine Seele erhebt den Herren (Schübler chorales) BWV 648". Bach Digital. 2015. (BDW 736, with links to descriptions of the first print and later manuscript copies)
- "Meine Seel erhebt den Herren. Notated Music". Library of Congress. 1740. (facsimile and description of US-Wc ML30.8b.B2 M4, Bach's autograph score of BWV 10)
- "Washington, D.C., Library of Congress: US-Wc ML30.8b.B2 M4". Bach Digital. 2017. (description of US-Wc ML30.8b.B2 M4, Bach's autograph score of BWV 10)
