= German Magnificat =

Meine Seele erhebt den Herren is Martin Luther's German translation of the Magnificat.

German Magnificat may also refer to:

- German Magnificat (Bach), Johann Sebastian Bach's cantata Meine Seel erhebt den Herren, BWV 10
- Magnificat in A minor (Hoffmann), BWV Anh. 21, once attributed to Bach, more recently attributed to Melchior Hoffmann
- Magnificat peregrini toni, the traditional setting of Luther's German Magnificat
- Meine Seele erhebt den Herren (Pachelbel), one of two organ preludes Johann Pachelbel composed on the Magnificat peregrini toni
- Meine Seele erhebt den Herren (Schütz), one of several German Magnificat settings by Heinrich Schütz
- Meine Seele rühmt und preist, BWV 189, on a German paraphrase of the Magnificat text, attribution to Bach doubtful, probably composed by Melchior Hoffmann
