= Magnificat in A minor (Hoffmann) =

Vocal composition by Melchior Hoffmann of the Song of Mary from the Gospel of Luke

Magnificat
- Sacred vocal music by Melchior Hoffmann
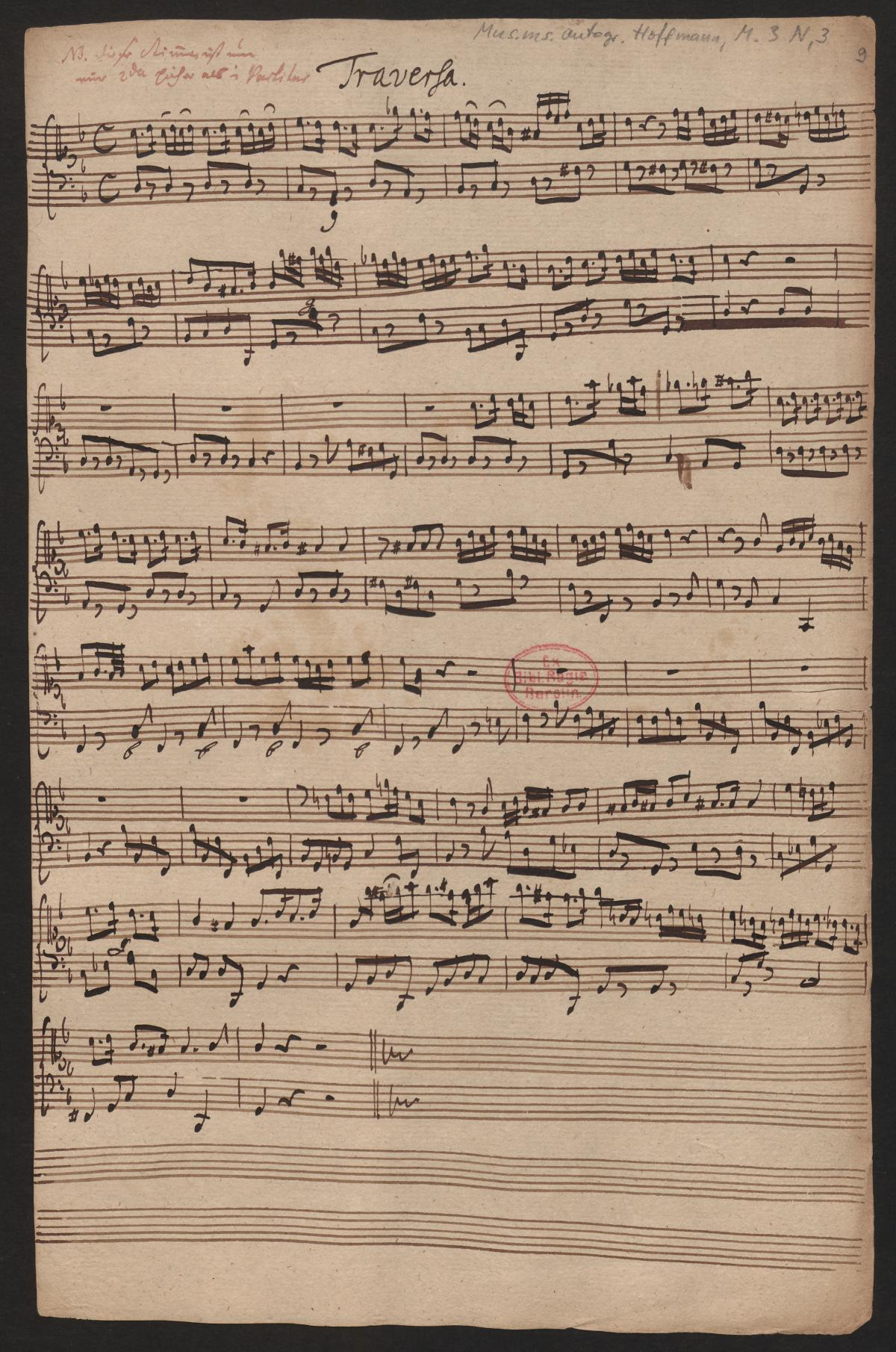
- Early 18th-century manuscript copy, likely written by Gottfried Heinrich Stölzel, of the "Traversa" part of Hoffmann's Magnificat
- Other name: Kleines Magnificat
- Key: A minor
- Catalogue: BWV Anh. 21
- Text: "Meine Seele erhebt den Herren"
- Language: German
- Composed: 1707

The Magnificat in A minor, BWV Anh. 21, TWV 1:1748, is Melchior Hoffmann's musical setting of a German version (Meine Seele erhebt den Herren) of the Song of Mary (Magnificat, "My soul magnifies the Lord") from the Gospel of Luke. The composition originated around 1707, when the composer was director musices and organist of the Neue Kirche in Leipzig. Composed in A minor, the Magnificat is scored for soprano and small orchestra. The work was first published in the 1950s, and it was recorded by Magda László, by Joshua Rifkin, by Wolfgang Helbich, and by Deborah York, among others.

According to the editors of the Bach-Gesellschaft-Ausgabe (BGA), the work, considered lost since the late 1850s, was composed by Johann Sebastian Bach. It was dubbed Kleines Magnificat (kleines translating as "little" or "small") to distinguish it from more extended Magnificat settings, such as BWV 243 in Latin, and BWV 10 and BWV 189 in German (the last of these is listed as a composition by Hoffmann at the Bach Digital website). The 1950 first edition of the Bach-Werke-Verzeichnis (BWV) listed the small Magnificat in its first Anhang, that is the Anhang of lost works. Some years later, when recovered original manuscripts of the composition and of other works by the composer were analysed, the work was, after being erroneously attributed to Georg Philipp Telemann for some years, ultimately attributed to Hoffmann.

== History ==
The Magnificat or Song of Mary is one of the three New Testament canticles, the others being Nunc dimittis and Benedictus. Mary sings the song on the occasion of her visit to Elizabeth, as narrated in the Gospel of Luke (Luke 1:39–56). The Magnificat canticle was, in its Latin version, a regular part in Catholic vesper services, and was also used in the Lutheran church, mostly in German and occasionally in Latin, in vespers and for Marian feasts. On such occasions, a doxology concludes the bible verses from the Gospel of Luke. In the Luther Bible, the first verse of the German Magnificat reads "Meine Seele erhebt den Herren". In 1700, two years before becoming a law student in Leipzig, Melchior Hoffmann composed a Latin Magnificat in D minor.

Hoffmann's A minor setting of the German Magnificat dates from around 1707. At the time he was the organist of Leipzig's Neue Kirche (new church). In 1705 he had succeeded Georg Philipp Telemann both as director musices of the Neue Kirche and as leader of the Collegium Musicum which Telemann had founded in 1702. Among the students of Leipzig University belonging to that ensemble was Gottfried Heinrich Stölzel, who helped Hoffmann copy out performance parts of his Magnificat. In 1729, when a successor of Hoffmann left town, Johann Sebastian Bach became leader of the Collegium Musicum founded by Telemann, and Carl Gotthelf Gerlach, one of Bach's former students, became organist and director musices at the Neue Kirche. Shortly thereafter, Gerlach, who also was a singer, made a new copy of the vocal part of Hoffmann's Magnificat, with some adjustments to make it more suitable for performance.

== Structure ==
Hoffmann structured the Magnificat in 10 movements, eight for the text from the Gospel of Luke, and two for an extended doxology, mostly alternating arias and recitatives, with a chorale setting to begin the doxology:

1. Aria: Meine Seele erhebt den Herren
2. Recitativo: Denn er hat seine elende Magd angesehen
3. Aria: Und seine Barmherzigkeit währet immer
4. Recitativo: Er übet Gewalt mit seinem Arm
5. Aria: Er stößet die Gewaltigen vom Stuhl
6. Recitativo: Die Hungrigen füllet er mit Gütern
7. Aria: Er denket der Barmherzigkeit
8. Recitativo: Wie er gered't hat unseren Vätern
9. Chorale: Lob und Preis sei Gott
10. Aria: Wie es war im Anfang

The Magnificat is scored for soprano, flauto traverso, two violins and continuo.

== Reception ==
Gerlach remained organist and director musices of the Neue Kirche until his death in July 1761. Having died without near relatives, the lion share of his musical legacy appears to have been acquired by the music publishing enterprise of Bernhard Christoph and Johann Gottlob Immanuel Breitkopf. For the Leipzig Michaelmas fair of 1761, the Breitkopf firm issued a catalogue of works that were available at the publisher's. The catalogue included Hoffmann's Magnificats in D minor and in A minor: the former under Hoffmann's name, the latter as an anonymous composition. The manuscript performance parts of the A minor Magnificat which were once owned by Breitkopf later came in the possession of the Berlin State Library (SBB).

In his preface to Vol. 11.1 (1862) of the Bach-Gesellschaft Ausgabe (BGA), Wilhelm Rust mentioned a Magnificat for soprano and small orchestra (German: Magnificat für Sopran und kleines Orchester), of which he had seen a manuscript score, which around the mid-1850s was owned by Siegfried Dehn. According to Rust, what he had seen was an autograph of a composition by Johann Sebastian Bach. Further, Rust considered that manuscript lost. In fact, Dehn, who also assumed that the manuscript was a Bach autograph, had deliberately kept it away from the BGA editors, shipping it to Russia shortly before his death in 1858. Based on Rust, Bach's 19th-century biographer Philipp Spitta described this "small Magnificat" by Bach as lost.

In 1940 the British musicologist William G. Whittaker located the manuscript described by Rust in a library in Saint Petersburg (at the time known as Leningrad). Through the disarray caused by the Second World War, the discovery remained virtually unnoticed in the musical world. When Wolfgang Schmieder published the first edition of the Bach-Werke-Verzeichnis (BWV) in 1950, he listed the Kleines Magnificat in the catalogue's first Anhang, as No. 21, among Bach's lost works (BWV Anh. I 21). In 1954 Alfred Dürr and Frederick Hudson examined the score in the Saint Petersburg library, confirming that it was the manuscript once owned by Dehn, and described by Rust, but determining that it was certainly not written by Bach, and that it was thus very unlikely Bach had composed this Magnificat. It was also determined that the composition in the Saint Petersburg score was identical to the anonymous Magnificat in A minor of which the Berlin State Library had the performance parts.

In his 1958 edition of the Little Magnificat, Ermenegildo Paccagnella indicated Bach as its composer, notwithstanding that this attribution was no longer supported in scholarship. Also in Diethard Hellmann's edition of the Magnificat, published by Hänssler in 1961, the composition was ascribed to Bach. In the next decade Hans-Joachim Schulze attributed it to Georg Philipp Telemann (TWV 1:1748 – the same catalogue number was also used for the cantata Singet dem Herrn ein neues Lied, TWV 1:1748, which was also re-attributed to Hoffmann). Andreas Glöckner sorted the attribution conundrum in his contribution to the Bach-Jahrbuch of 1982, in which he identified Hoffmann as the composer. Hellmann's revised edition of the Magnificat was published by Carus-Verlag in 1987. In the 1998 edition of the BWV, the Magnificat was repositioned in Anh. III, that is the Anhang of spurious works, as a composition by Hoffmann: its full BWV number thus became BWV Anh. 21 / Anh. III 168. A digital facsimile of the 18th-century performance parts of the Magnificat is available at the SBB website since 2014. A similar facsimile is available at the Bach Digital website.

=== Recordings ===
Hoffmann's German Magnificat in A minor was recorded:

- By soprano Magda László accompanied by five instrumentalists, c. 1958.
- In April 1965, by Micheline Tessier, with L'Ensemble instrumental de Arts-Québec conducted by Mireille Lagacé.
- By Brigitte Ganady, with an instrumental ensemble conducted by Georges Aubert (1969).
- Joshua Rifkin recorded the work in 1982, with soprano Jane Bryden.
- In 2001, the work was recorded by Wolfgang Helbich conducting the Alsfelder Vokalensemble. In 2014, this recording was re-issued in the 8 CD Box The Sacred Apocryphal Bach.
- Deborah York sang the Magnificat with the Elbipolis Barockorchester Hamburg for a 2009 recording.
