= Melchior Hoffmann =

Melchior Hoffmann may refer to:

- Melchior Hoffman (c. 1495–1543), Anabaptist prophet
- Melchior Hoffmann (composer) (1679–1715), Baroque composer
