= List of compositions by Johann Joachim Quantz =

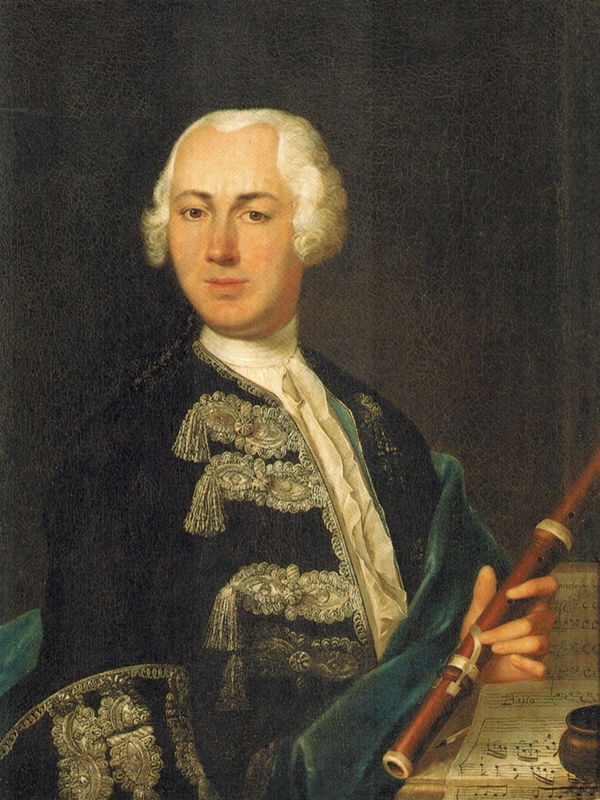
Portrait of Johann Joachim Quantz by Johann Friedrich Gerhard, 1735

The list of compositions by Johann Joachim Quantz was established by Horst Augsbach. QV stands for "Quantz Verzeichnis", and Anh. for "Anhang" (supplement) when the authenticity of the works is spurious.

== Flute sonatas ==
The numbering follows the Catalogue des solos pour Sans Souci and the Catalogue des solos pour le Nouveau Palais that contains works of both Quantz and his student Frederick II, King of Prussia. These two catalogues start at number 88. The previous Catalogue des solos pour Potsdam containing sonatas Nos. 1–87 never existed and there are no missing sonatas. Rather, the copyist of the catalog seems to have copied 87 concertos before turning to the sonatas, at which point he resumed with the no. 88 for the first sonata. The sonatas by Quantz are numbered as follows: 88–105, 142, 219–254 & 265–361. The 121 sonatas by Frederick II are: 106–141, 143–218 & 255–264. The sonatas with a Roman numeral numbering are part of the collection Sonata a flauto traverso solo e cembalo da Gio: Gioacchino Quantz.

- QV 1: 1 – Flute Sonata No. 360 in C major
- QV 1: 2 – Flute Sonata No. 284 in C major
- QV 1: 3 – Flute Sonata No. 346 in C major
- QV 1: 4 – Flute Sonata No. 241 in C major
- QV 1: 5a – Flute Sonata No. 91 in C major
- QV 1: 5b – Flute Sonata XVII in C major
- QV 1: 6 – Flute Sonata No. 226 in C major
- QV 1: 7 – Movement of Flute Sonata in C major
- QV 1: 8 – Flute Sonata No. 312 in C major
- QV 1: 9 – Flute Sonata No. 95 in C major
- QV 1: 10 – Flute Sonata No. 332 in C major
- QV 1: 11 – Flute Sonata No. 319 in C major
- QV 1: 12 – Flute Sonata No. 268 in C major
- QV 1: 13 – Flute Sonata No. 298 in C major
- QV 1: 14 – Flute Sonata No. 305 in C minor
- QV 1: 15 – Flute Sonata III in C minor
- QV 1: 16 – Flute Sonata in C minor, Op. 1 No. 3
- QV 1: 17 – Flute Sonata X in C minor
- QV 1: 18 – Flute Sonata No. 276 in C minor
- QV 1: 19 – Flute Sonata No. 339 in C minor
- QV 1: 20 – Flute Sonata No. 353 in C minor
- QV 1: 21 – Flute Sonata No. 291 in C minor
- QV 1: 22 – Flute Sonata No. 325 in C minor
- QV 1: 23 – Flute Sonata No. 250 in C minor
- QV 1: 24 – Flute Sonata XII in D major
- QV 1: 25 – Flute Sonata in D major
- QV 1: 26 – Flute Sonata No. 292 in D major
- QV 1: 27 – Flute Sonata No. 242 in D major
- QV 1: 28 – Flute Sonata No. 251 in D major
- QV 1: 29 – Flute Sonata No. 299 in D major
- QV 1: 30 – Flute Sonata No. 313 in D major
- QV 1: 31 – Flute Sonata No. 354 in D major
- QV 1: 32 – Flute Sonata No. 269 in D major
- QV 1: 33 – Flute Sonata No. 219 in D major
- QV 1: 34 – Flute Sonata No. 333 in D major
- QV 1: 35 – Flute Sonata No. 247 in D major
- QV 1: 36 – Flute Sonata No. 340 in D major
- QV 1: 37a – Flute Sonata IV in D major
- QV 1: 37b – Flute Sonata No. 227 in D major
- QV 1: 38 – Flute Sonata No. 326 in D major
- QV 1: 39 – Flute Sonata No. 361 in D major
- QV 1: 40 – Flute Sonata No. 92 in D major
- QV 1: 41 – Flute Sonata No. 228 in D major
- QV 1: 42 – Flute Sonata No. 277 in D major
- QV 1: 43 – Flute Sonata No. 96 in D major
- QV 1: 44 – Flute Sonata No. 245 in D major
- QV 1: 45 – Flute Sonata No. 347 in D major
- QV 1: 46 – Flute Sonata No. 285 in D major
- QV 1: 47 – Flute Sonata No. 306 in D major
- QV 1: 48 – Flute Sonata in D major, Op. 1 No. 4
- QV 1: 49 – Flute Sonata in D major, Op. 1 No. 6
- QV 1: 50 – Flute Sonata No. 341 in E♭ major
- QV 1: 51 – Flute Sonata No. 270 in E♭ major
- QV 1: 52 – Flute Sonata No. 327 in E♭ major
- QV 1: 53 – Movement of Flute Sonata in E♭ major published in Quantz's Versuch (1752)
- QV 1: 54 – Flute Sonata No. 348 in E♭ major
- QV 1: 55 – Flute Sonata No. 286 in E♭ major
- QV 1: 56 – Flute Sonata No. 94 in E♭ major
- QV 1: 57 – Flute Sonata V in E♭ major
- QV 1: 58a – Flute Sonata No. 98 in E♭ major
- QV 1: 58b – Flute Sonata XVIII in E♭ major
- QV 1: 59 – Flute Sonata No. 279 in E♭ major
- QV 1: 60 – Flute Sonata No. 300 in E♭ major
- QV 1: 61 – Flute Sonata No. 334 in E major
- QV 1: 62 – Flute Sonata No. 93 in E major
- QV 1: 63 – Flute Sonata No. 223 in E major
- QV 1: 64 – Flute Sonata No. 229 in E major
- QV 1: 65 – Flute Sonata No. 307 in E major
- QV 1: 66 – Flute Sonata No. 97 in E minor
- QV 1: 67 – Flute Sonata No. 355 in E minor
- QV 1: 68 – Flute Sonata No. 103 in E minor
- QV 1: 69 – Flute Sonata No. 220 in E minor
- QV 1: 70 – Flute Sonata No. 314 in E minor
- QV 1: 71 – Flute Sonata No. 101 in E minor
- QV 1: 72 – Flute Sonata No. 278 in E minor
- QV 1: 73 – Flute Sonata No. 252 in E minor
- QV 1: 74 – Flute Sonata No. 243 in E minor
- QV 1: 75 – Flute Sonata No. 234 in E minor
- QV 1: 76 – Flute Sonata No. 318 in E minor
- QV 1: 77 – Flute Sonata in E minor, Op. 1 No. 5
- QV 1: 78 – Flute Sonata No. 293 in E minor
- QV 1: 79 – Flute Sonata No. 320 in E minor
- QV 1: 80 – Flute Sonata No. 335 in F major
- QV 1: 81 – Flute Sonata No. 294 in F major
- QV 1: 82 – Flute Sonata No. 356 in F major
- QV 1: 83 – Flute Sonata No. 253 in F major
- QV 1: 84 – Flute Sonata XVIIII in F major
- QV 1: 85 – Flute Sonata No. 321 in F major
- QV 1: 86 – Flute Sonata XIII in F major
- QV 1: 87 – Flute Sonata No. 301 in F major
- QV 1: 88 – Flute Sonata No. 287 in F major
- QV 1: 89 – Flute Sonata No. 349 in F major
- QV 1: 90 – Flute Sonata No. 308 in F major
- QV 1: 91 – Flute Sonata No. 280 in F major
- QV 1: 92 – Flute Sonata No. 328 in F major
- QV 1: 93 – Flute Sonata No. 272 in F major
- QV 1: 94 – Flute Sonata No. 342 in F major
- QV 1: 95 – Flute Sonata VI in F minor
- QV 1: 96 – Flute Sonata No. 89 in G major
- QV 1: 97 – Flute Sonata No. 238 in G major
- QV 1: 98 – Variations on Ich schlief da träumte mir in G major
- QV 1: 99 – Flute Sonata No. 225 in G major
- QV 1:100 – Flute Sonata No. 244 in G major
- QV 1:101 – Flute Sonata in G major
- QV 1:102 – Flute Sonata No. 309 in G major
- QV 1:103 – Flute Sonata No. 350 in G major
- QV 1:104 – Flute Sonata No. 254 in G major
- QV 1:105 – Flute Sonata No. 343 in G major
- QV 1:106 – Flute Sonata No. 329 in G major
- QV 1:107 – Flute Sonata No. 88 in G major
- QV 1:108a – Flute Sonata in G major
- QV 1:108b – Oboe Sonata in E♭ major
- QV 1:109 – Flute Sonata No. 273 in G major
- QV 1:110 – Flute Sonata No. 246 in G major
- QV 1:111 – Flute Sonata No. 232 in G major
- QV 1:112 – Flute Sonata No. 295 in G major
- QV 1:113 – Flute Sonata No. 236 in G major
- QV 1:114 – Flute Sonata No. 233 in G minor
- QV 1:115 – Flute Sonata No. 281 in G minor
- QV 1:116 – Flute Sonata XIV in G minor
- QV 1:117 – Flute Sonata No. 315 in G minor
- QV 1:118 – Flute Sonata No. 288 in G minor
- QV 1:119 – Flute Sonata No. 265 in G minor
- QV 1:120 – Flute Sonata No. 357 in G minor
- QV 1:121 – Flute Sonata XX in G minor
- QV 1:122 – Flute Sonata No. 271 in G minor
- QV 1:123 – Flute Sonata No. 237 in G minor
- QV 1:124 – Flute Sonata No. 302 in G minor
- QV 1:125 – Flute Sonata VII in G minor
- QV 1:126 – Flute Sonata No. 336 in G minor
- QV 1:127 – Flute Sonata No. 322 in G minor
- QV 1:128 – Flute Sonata No. 142 in G minor
- QV 1:129 – Flute Sonata No. 323 in A major
- QV 1:130 – Flute Sonata No. 289 in A major
- QV 1:131 – Flute Sonata No. 337 in A major
- QV 1:132 – Flute Sonata No. 358 in A major
- QV 1:133 – Flute Sonata No. 224 in A major
- QV 1:134 – Flute Sonata No. 222 in A major
- QV 1:135 – Flute Sonata No. 282 in A major
- QV 1:136 – Flute Sonata No. 296 in A major
- QV 1:137 – Flute Sonata No. 310 in A major
- QV 1:138 – Flute Sonata No. 239 in A major
- QV 1:139 – Flute Sonata No. 344 in A major
- QV 1:140 – Flute Sonata No. 330 in A major
- QV 1:141 – Flute Sonata No. 316 in A major
- QV 1:142 – Flute Sonata No. 266 in A major
- QV 1:143 – Flute Sonata No. 351 in A major
- QV 1:144 – Flute Sonata No. 303 in A major
- QV 1:145 – Flute Sonata No. 274 in A major
- QV 1:146 – Flute Sonata I in A minor
- QV 1:147 – Flute Sonata No. 99 in A minor
- QV 1:148 – Flute Sonata No. 248 in A minor
- QV 1:149 – Flute Sonata No. 235 in A minor
- QV 1:150 – Flute Sonata No. 230 in A minor
- QV 1:151 – Flute Sonata No. 105 in A minor
- QV 1:152 – Flute Sonata in A minor, Op. 1 No. 1
- QV 1:153 – Flute Sonata No. 102 in B♭ major, Op. 1 No. 2
- QV 1:154 – Flute Sonata No. 345 in B♭ major
- QV 1:155 – Flute Sonata No. 304 in B♭ major
- QV 1:156 – Flute Sonata No. 249 in B♭ major
- QV 1:157 – Flute Sonata No. 352 in B♭ major
- QV 1:158 – Flute Sonata No. 290 in B♭ major
- QV 1:159 – Flute Sonata No. 324 in B♭ major
- QV 1:160 – Flute Sonata No. 338 in B♭ major
- QV 1:161 – Flute Sonata No. 275 in B♭ major
- QV 1:162 – Flute Sonata No. 317 in B♭ major
- QV 1:163 – Flute Sonata II in B♭ major
- QV 1:164 – Flute Sonata No. 90 in B♭ major
- QV 1:165 – Flute Sonata No. 331 in B minor
- QV 1:166 – Flute Sonata No. 311 in B minor
- QV 1:167 – Flute Sonata No. 104 in B minor
- QV 1:168 – Flute Sonata No. 231 in B minor
- QV 1:169 – Flute Sonata No. 267 in B minor
- QV 1:170 – Flute Sonata No. 283 in B minor
- QV 1:171 – Flute Sonata XI in B minor
- QV 1:172 – Flute Sonata No. 203 in B minor
- QV 1:173 – Flute Sonata No. 100 in B minor
- QV 1:174 – Flute Sonata No. 297 in B minor
- QV 1:175 – Flute Sonata No. 359 in B minor
- QV 1:176 – Flute Sonata No. 240 in B minor
- QV 1:177 – Pieces for flute & continuo I
- QV 1:178 – Pieces for flute & continuo II
- QV 1:179 – Flute Sonata in C minor
- QV 1:180 – Flute Sonata in G major
- QV 1:181 – Flute Sonata in G major
- QV 1:182 – Flute Sonata in E minor
- QV 1:183 – Flute Sonata in G minor
- QV 1:184 – Flute Sonata in D major
- QV 1:Anh. 1 – Flute Sonata in C major (lost)
- QV 1:Anh. 2 – Flute Sonata in C major
- QV 1:Anh. 3 – Flute Sonata in C major
- QV 1:Anh. 4 – Flute Sonata in C major
- QV 1:Anh. 5 – Flute Sonata in C minor
- QV 1:Anh. 6 – Flute Sonata in D major
- QV 1:Anh. 7 – Flute Sonata in D major (lost)
- QV 1:Anh. 8 – Flute Sonata in D major
- QV 1:Anh. 9a – Flute Sonata in D major
- QV 1:Anh. 9b – Flute Sonata in D major
- QV 1:Anh.10 – Flute Sonata in D major
- QV 1:Anh.11 – Flute Sonata in D major (lost)
- QV 1:Anh.12 – Flute Sonata in D major
- QV 1:Anh.13 – Flute Sonata in D major
- QV 1:Anh.14a – Flute Sonata in D major
- QV 1:Anh.14b – Flute Sonata in D major
- QV 1:Anh.15 – Flute Sonata in D major
- QV 1:Anh.16 – Flute Sonata in D minor
- QV 1:Anh.17 – Flute Sonata in E♭ major (lost)
- QV 1:Anh.18 – Flute Sonata in E minor
- QV 1:Anh.19 – Flute Sonata in E minor
- QV 1:Anh.20 – Flute Sonata in E minor
- QV 1:Anh.21 – Flute Sonata in E minor
- QV 1:Anh.22 – Flute Sonata in E minor
- QV 1:Anh.23 – Flute Sonata in E minor
- QV 1:Anh.24 – Flute Sonata in G major
- QV 1:Anh.25 – Flute Sonata in G major
- QV 1:Anh.26 – Flute Sonata in G major
- QV 1:Anh.27 – Flute Sonata in G major
- QV 1:Anh.28 – Flute Sonata in G major (lost)
- QV 1:Anh.29 – Flute Sonata in G major
- QV 1:Anh.30 – Flute Sonata in G major
- QV 1:Anh.31 – Flute Sonata in G major
- QV 1:Anh.32 – Flute Sonata in G major
- QV 1:Anh.33 – Flute Sonata in G major
- QV 1:Anh.34 – Flute Sonata in G major
- QV 1:Anh.35 – Flute Sonata in G major
- QV 1:Anh.36 – Flute Sonata in G major
- QV 1:Anh.37 – Flute Sonata in A minor
- QV 1:Anh.38 – Flute Sonata in A minor
- QV 1:Anh.39 – Bassoon Sonata in B♭ major
- QV 1:Anh.40 – Oboe Sonata in B♭ major (lost)
- QV 1:Anh.41 – Flute Sonata in B major
- QV 1:Anh.42 – Flute Sonata in B minor
- QV 1:Anh.43 – Flute Sonata in B minor
- QV 1:Anh.44 – Flute Sonata in B minor
- QV 1:Anh.45 – 4 Flute Sonatas

== Trio sonatas ==
The variable instrumentation of the trio sonatas in indicated in parentheses. Some of the trio sonatas call for two instruments only with the harpsichord playing one dessus and the continuo. For example, 'Sonata for flute, (violin) & harpsichord (continuo)' means that it can be played by flute, violin and continuo or flute and harpsichord.

- QV 2: 1 – Sonata for flute, violin (flute) & continuo Op. 3 No. 3 in C major
- QV 2: 2 – Sonata for flute, recorder & continuo in C major
- QV 2: 3 – Sonata for 2 flutes & continuo in C minor
- QV 2: 4 – Sonata for flute, viola d'amore & continuo in C minor
- QV 2: 5 – Sonata for flute, oboe & continuo in C minor
- QV 2: 6 – Sonata for 2 flutes & continuo Op. 3 No. 2 in D major
- QV 2: 7 – Sonata for 2 flutes & continuo in D major
- QV 2: 8 – Sonata for 2 flutes & continuo in D major
- QV 2: 9 – Sonata for flute, violin & continuo in D major
- QV 2:10 – Sonata for flute, violin & continuo Op. 3 No. 6 in D major
- QV 2:11 – Sonata for 2 flutes & continuo in D major (lost)
- QV 2:12 – Sonata for 2 flutes & continuo in D major
- QV 2:13 – Sonata for 2 flutes & continuo in D major
- QV 2:14 – Sonata for flute, (violin) & harpsichord (continuo) in D major
- QV 2:15 – Sonata for 2 flutes & continuo in D major
- QV 2:16 – Sonata for flute, violin & continuo in D minor
- QV 2:17 – Sonata for 2 flutes & continuo in E♭ major
- QV 2:18 – Sonata for flute, (violin) & harpsichord (continuo) in E♭ major
- QV 2:19 – Sonata for 2 flutes & continuo in E minor
- QV 2:20 – Sonata for flute, violin & continuo in E minor
- QV 2:21 – Sonata for flute, (violin) & harpsichord (continuo) in E minor
- QV 2:22 – Sonata for flute, violin (flute) & continuo in E minor
- QV 2:23 – Sonata for 2 flutes, oboes or violins & continuo Op. 3 No. 5 in E minor
- QV 2:24 – Sonata for flute, (violin) & harpsichord (continuo) in F major
- QV 2:25 – Sonata for flute, violin (flute) & continuo in F minor
- QV 2:26 – Sonata for flute, oboe d'amore (violin) & continuo in G major
- QV 2:27 – Sonata for oboe, violin & continuo in G major
- QV 2:28 – Sonata for flute, (violin) & harpsichord (continuo) in G major
- QV 2:29 – Sonata for flute, violin & continuo in G major
- QV 2:30 – Sonata for oboe, cello (bassoon) & continuo in G major
- QV 2:31 – Sonata for flute, oboe (violin) & continuo Op. 3 No. 1 in G major
- QV 2:32 – Sonata for 2 flutes & continuo Op. 3 No. 4 in G major
- QV 2:33 – Sonata for flute, violin (flute) & continuo in G major
- QV 2:34 – Sonata for flute, violin & continuo in G minor
- QV 2:35 – Sonata for flute, (violin) & harpsichord (continuo) in G minor
- QV 2:36 – Sonata for 2 flutes & continuo in A major
- QV 2:37 – Sonata for 2 violins (flutes) & continuo in A major
- QV 2:38 – Sonata for 2 flutes, oboes or violins & continuo in A major
- QV 2:39 – Sonata for flute, violin (flute) & continuo in A minor
- QV 2:40 – Sonata for 2 flutes & continuo in A minor
- QV 2:41a – Sonata for 2 flutes & continuo in A minor
- QV 2:41b – Sonata for 2 oboes & continuo in G minor
- QV 2:42 – Sonata for flute, violin (flute) & continuo in B♭ major
- QV 2:43 – Sonata for flute, violin (flute) & continuo in B minor
- QV 2:Anh.1 – March for 2 oboes & bassoon in E♭ major
- QV 2:Anh.2 – Sonata for 2 flutes (oboe & violin) & continuo in E minor
- QV 2:Anh.3 – Sonata for flute, violin (flute) & continuo in G major
- QV 2:Anh.4 – Sonata for flute, violin & continuo in G major

== Flute Solos ==
The third group of compositions gathers works for 1 to 3 flutes without continuo.

- QV 3:1. 1 – Fantasia for flute solo in C major
- QV 3:1. 2 – Fantasia for flute solo in C major
- QV 3:1. 3 – Vivace alla Francese for flute solo in D major
- QV 3:1. 4 – Capricio for flute solo in D major
- QV 3:1. 5 – Fantasia for flute solo in D major
- QV 3:1. 6 – Capricio for flute solo in D major
- QV 3:1. 7 – Praeludium for flute solo in D major
- QV 3:1. 8 – Capricio I for flute solo in D minor
- QV 3:1. 9 – Fantasia for flute solo in E minor
- QV 3:1.10 – Capricio II for flute solo in E minor
- QV 3:1.11 – Fantasia for flute solo in E minor
- QV 3:1.12 – Capricio for flute solo in F major
- QV 3:1.13 – Capricio for flute solo in G major
- QV 3:1.14 – Capricio VI for flute solo in G major
- QV 3:1.15 – Capricio IV for flute solo in G major
- QV 3:1.16 – Allegretto con variazioni for flute solo in G major
- QV 3:1.17 – Capricio V for flute solo in G major
- QV 3:1.18 – Presto for flute solo in G major
- QV 3:1.19 – Capricio VII for flute solo in A minor
- QV 3:1.20 – Menuetto for flute solo in B♭ major
- QV 3:1.21 – Capricio VIII for flute solo in B♭ major
- QV 3:1.22 – Adagio for flute solo in B minor
- QV 3:1.23 – Presto for flute solo in B minor
- QV 3:1.24 – Fantasia for flute solo in B minor
- QV 3:2.1 – Flute Duet Op. 2 No. 4 in C major
- QV 3:2.2 – Flute Duet Op. 2 No. 5 in D major
- QV 3:2.3 – Flute Duet Op. 2 No. 6 in E minor
- QV 3:2.4 – Flute Duet Op. 2 No. 1 in G major
- QV 3:2.5 – Flute Duet Op. 2 No. 2 in A minor
- QV 3:2.6 – Flute Duet Op. 2 No. 3 in B minor
- QV 3:2.Anh. 1 – Minuet for flute duet in D major
- QV 3:2.Anh. 2 – Flute Duet Op. 5 No. 3 in D major
- QV 3:2.Anh. 3 – Flute Duet Op. 5 No. 2 in D major
- QV 3:2.Anh. 4 – Flute Duet Op. 5 No. 6 in E minor
- QV 3:2.Anh. 5 – Flute Duet Op. 5 No. 4 in G major
- QV 3:2.Anh. 6 – Flute Duet Op. 5 No. 1 in A major
- QV 3:2.Anh. 7 – Flute Duet Op. 5 No. 5 in A minor
- QV 3:2.Anh. 8 – 7 duets for flute
- QV 3:2.Anh. 9 – 6 duets for flute (lost)
- QV 3:2.Anh.10 – 9 Duettino for flutes (flute 1 part is missing in the unique source)
- QV 3:3.1 – Sonata for 3 flutes in D major
- QV 3:3.2 – Sonata for 3 flutes in D major
- QV 3:3.3 – Sonata for 3 flutes in D major

== Flute concertos ==
Like the flute sonatas, the concertos are numbered according to the catalogues contemporary to Quantz, especially the Catalogue des concertos pour le Nouveau Palais. Quantz composed the concertos Nos. 1, 4–78, 80–85, 89 and 92–300. Frederick II composed only four concertos, Nos. 87, 88, 90 and 91. The concerto No. 2 is attributed on one source to Carl Heinrich Graun. As for the concertos Nos. 3, 79 and 86, the composer remains unknown. The flute concertos are listed in two categories, according to whether or not a viola part is included in the string accompaniment.

=== Flute concertos without viola part ===
Instrumentation: Flute, solo; 2 violins and basso continuo.

- QV 4:1 – Concerto No. 14 for flute in D major
- QV 4:2 – Concerto No. 25 for flute in E♭ major
- QV 4:3 – Concerto No. 13 for flute in E minor
- QV 4:4 – Concerto No. 11 for flute in G major
- QV 4:5 – Concerto No. 69 for flute in G major
- QV 4:6 – Concerto No. 12 for flute in A major
- QV 4:7 – Concerto No. 102 for flute in B minor

=== Flute concertos with viola part ===
Instrumentation: Flute, solo; 2 violins, viola and basso continuo.

- QV 5: 1 – Concerto No. 72 for flute in C major
- QV 5: 2 – Concerto No. 71 for flute in C major
- QV 5: 3 – Concerto No. 100 for flute in C major (lost)
- QV 5: 4 – Concerto No. 202 for flute in C major
- QV 5: 5 – Concerto No. 94 for flute in C major
- QV 5: 6 – Concerto No. 156 for flute in C major
- QV 5: 7 – Concerto No. 237 for flute in C major
- QV 5: 8 – Concerto No. 24 for flute in C major
- QV 5: 9 – Concerto No. 63 for flute in C major (lost)
- QV 5: 10 – Concerto No. 118 for flute in C major
- QV 5: 11 – Concerto No. 134 for flute in C major
- QV 5: 12 – Concerto No. 223 for flute in C major
- QV 5: 13 – Concerto No. 23 for flute in C major
- QV 5: 14 – Concerto No. 137 for flute in C major
- QV 5: 15 – Concerto No. 188 for flute in C major
- QV 5: 16 – Concerto No. 293 for flute in C major
- QV 5: 17 – Concerto No. 265 for flute in C major
- QV 5: 18 – Concerto No. 172 for flute in C major (lost)
- QV 5: 19 – Concerto No. 36 for flute in C major
- QV 5: 20 – Concerto No. 279 for flute in C major
- QV 5: 21 – Concerto No. 251 for flute in C major
- QV 5: 22 – Concerto No. 209 for flute in C major
- QV 5: 23 – Concerto No. 272 for flute in C major
- QV 5: 24 – Concerto No. 244 for flute in C minor
- QV 5: 25 – Concerto No. 216 for flute in C minor
- QV 5: 26 – Concerto No. 153 for flute in C minor
- QV 5: 27 – Concerto No. 53 for flute in C minor (lost)
- QV 5: 28 – Concerto No. 181 for flute in C minor
- QV 5: 29 – Concerto No. 164 for flute in C minor (lost)
- QV 5: 30 – Concerto No. 119 for flute in C minor (lost)
- QV 5: 31 – Concerto No. 54 for flute in C minor (lost)
- QV 5: 32 – Concerto No. 108 for flute in C minor
- QV 5: 33 – Concerto No. 230 for flute in C minor
- QV 5: 34 – Concerto No. 258 for flute in C minor
- QV 5: 35 – Concerto No. 147 for flute in C minor
- QV 5: 36 – Concerto No. 7 for flute in C minor
- QV 5: 37 – Concerto No. 286 for flute in C minor
- QV 5: 38 – Concerto No. 300 for flute in C minor
- QV 5: 39 – Concerto No. 195 for flute in C minor
- QV 5: 40 – Concerto No. 26 for flute in D major
- QV 5: 41 – Concerto No. 182 for flute in D major
- QV 5: 42 – Concerto No. 101 for flute in D major (lost)
- QV 5: 43 – Concerto No. 40 for flute in D major
- QV 5: 44 – Concerto No. 231 for flute in D major
- QV 5: 45 – Concerto No. 144 for flute in D major
- QV 5: 46 – Concerto No. 116 for flute in D major
- QV 5: 47 – Concerto No. 92 for flute in D major
- QV 5: 48 – Concerto No. 78 for flute in D major
- QV 5: 49 – Concerto No. 45 for flute in D major
- QV 5: 50 – Concerto No. 259 for flute in D major
- QV 5: 51 – Concerto No. 82 for flute in D major (1st version)
- QV 5: 52 – Concerto No. 82 for flute in D major (2nd version)
- QV 5: 53 – Concerto No. 28 for flute in D major
- QV 5: 54 – Concerto No. 17 for flute in D major
- QV 5: 55 – Concerto No. 127 for flute in D major
- QV 5: 56 – Concerto No. 110 for flute in D major (lost)
- QV 5: 57 – Concerto No. 42 for flute in D major
- QV 5: 58 – Concerto No. 75 for flute in D major
- QV 5: 59 – Concerto No. 217 for flute in D major
- QV 5: 60 – Concerto No. 203 for flute in D major
- QV 5: 61 – Concerto No. 294 for flute in D major
- QV 5: 62 – Concerto No. 41 for flute in D major
- QV 5: 63 – Concerto No. 224 for flute in D major
- QV 5: 64 – Concerto No. 252 for flute in D major
- QV 5: 65 – Concerto No. 238 for flute in D major
- QV 5: 66 – Concerto No. 157 for flute in D major
- QV 5: 67 – Concerto No. 266 for flute in D major
- QV 5: 68 – Concerto No. 245 for flute in D major
- QV 5: 69 – Concerto No. 22 for flute in D major
- QV 5: 70 – Concerto No. 173 for flute in D major (lost)
- QV 5: 71 – Concerto No. 196 for flute in D major
- QV 5: 72 – Concerto No. 280 for flute in D major
- QV 5: 73 – Concerto No. 15 for flute in D major
- QV 5: 74 – Concerto No. 70 for flute in D major
- QV 5: 75 – Concerto No. 29 for flute in D major
- QV 5: 76 – Concerto No. 210 for flute in D major
- QV 5: 77 – Concerto No. 287 for flute in D major
- QV 5: 78 – Concerto No. 273 for flute in D major
- QV 5: 79 – Concerto No. 121 for flute in D minor (lost)
- QV 5: 80 – Concerto No. 30 for flute in D minor
- QV 5: 81 – Concerto No. 113 for flute in D minor
- QV 5: 82 – Concerto No. 189 for flute in D minor
- QV 5: 83 – Concerto No. 37 for flute in D minor
- QV 5: 84 – Concerto No. 165 for flute in D minor (lost)
- QV 5: 85 – Concerto No. 140 for flute in D minor
- QV 5: 86 – Concerto No. 38 for flute in D minor
- QV 5: 87 – Concerto No. 73 for flute in D minor
- QV 5: 88 – Concerto No. 139 for flute in D minor
- QV 5: 89 – Concerto No. 109 for flute in E♭ major
- QV 5: 90 – Concerto No. 260 for flute in E♭ major
- QV 5: 91 – Concerto No. 175 for flute in E♭ major (lost)
- QV 5: 92 – Concerto No. 55 for flute in E♭ major (lost)
- QV 5: 93 – Concerto No. 143 for flute in E♭ major
- QV 5: 94 – Concerto No. 211 for flute in E♭ major
- QV 5: 95 – Concerto No. 159 for flute in E♭ major
- QV 5: 96 – Concerto No. 122 for flute in E♭ major (lost)
- QV 5: 97 – Concerto No. 246 for flute in E♭ major
- QV 5: 98 – Concerto No. 267 for flute in E♭ major
- QV 5: 99 – Concerto No. 281 for flute in E♭ major
- QV 5:100 – Concerto No. 218 for flute in E♭ major
- QV 5:101 – Concerto No. 8 for flute in E♭ major
- QV 5:102 – Concerto No. 190 for flute in E♭ major
- QV 5:103 – Concerto No. 204 for flute in E♭ major
- QV 5:104 – Concerto No. 232 for flute in E♭ major
- QV 5:105 – Concerto No. 166 for flute in E♭ major (lost)
- QV 5:106 – Concerto No. 288 for flute in E♭ major
- QV 5:107 – Concerto No. 178 for flute in E major
- QV 5:108 – Concerto No. 146 for flute in E major
- QV 5:109 – Concerto No. 112 for flute in E minor (lost)
- QV 5:110 – Concerto No. 274 for flute in E minor
- QV 5:111 – Concerto No. 158 for flute in E minor
- QV 5:112 – Concerto No. 197 for flute in E minor
- QV 5:113 – Concerto No. 21 for flute in E minor
- QV 5:114 – Concerto No. 167 for flute in E minor (lost)
- QV 5:115 – Concerto No. 160 for flute in E minor
- QV 5:116 – Concerto No. 114 for flute in E minor
- QV 5:117 – Concerto No. 129 for flute in E minor
- QV 5:118 – Concerto No. 1 for flute in E minor
- QV 5:119 – Concerto No. 62 for flute in E minor (lost)
- QV 5:120 – Concerto No. 57 for flute in E minor
- QV 5:121 – Concerto No. 83 for flute in E minor
- QV 5:122 – Concerto No. 225 for flute in E minor
- QV 5:123 – Concerto No. 142 for flute in E minor
- QV 5:124 – Concerto No. 95 for flute in E minor
- QV 5:125 – Concerto No. 174 for flute in E minor (lost)
- QV 5:126 – Concerto No. 253 for flute in E minor
- QV 5:127 – Concerto No. 32 for flute in E minor
- QV 5:128 – Concerto No. 10 for flute in E minor
- QV 5:129 – Concerto No. 131 for flute in E minor
- QV 5:130 – Concerto No. 183 for flute in E minor
- QV 5:131 – Concerto No. 80 for flute in E minor
- QV 5:132 – Concerto No. 39 for flute in E minor
- QV 5:133 – Concerto No. 239 for flute in E minor
- QV 5:134 – Concerto No. 48 for flute in E minor (lost)
- QV 5:135 – Concerto No. 33 for flute in E minor
- QV 5:136 – Concerto No. 93 for flute in E minor
- QV 5:137 – Concerto No. 295 for flute in E minor
- QV 5:138 – Concerto No. 6 for flute in F major
- QV 5:139 – Concerto No. 103 for flute in F major
- QV 5:140 – Concerto No. 176 for flute in F major (lost)
- QV 5:141 – Concerto No. 254 for flute in F major
- QV 5:142 – Concerto No. 168 for flute in F major (lost)
- QV 5:143 – Concerto No. 126 for flute in F major
- QV 5:144 – Concerto No. 135 for flute in F major
- QV 5:145 – Concerto No. 247 for flute in F major
- QV 5:146 – Concerto No. 138 for flute in F major
- QV 5:147 – Concerto No. 240 for flute in F major
- QV 5:148 – Concerto No. 44 for flute in F major
- QV 5:149 – Concerto No. 191 for flute in F major
- QV 5:150 – Concerto No. 233 for flute in F major
- QV 5:151 – Concerto No. 212 for flute in F major
- QV 5:152 – Concerto No. 219 for flute in F major
- QV 5:153 – Concerto No. 282 for flute in F major
- QV 5:154 – Concerto No. 296 for flute in F major
- QV 5:155 – Concerto No. 205 for flute in F major
- QV 5:156 – Concerto No. 261 for flute in F major
- QV 5:157 – Concerto No. 275 for flute in F major
- QV 5:158 – Concerto No. 268 for flute in F major
- QV 5:159 – Concerto No. 226 for flute in F major
- QV 5:160 – Concerto No. 154 for flute in F major
- QV 5:161 – Concerto No. 198 for flute in F major
- QV 5:162 – Concerto No. 184 for flute in F major
- QV 5:163 – Concerto No. 289 for flute in F major
- QV 5:164 – Concerto No. 50 for flute in G major (lost)
- QV 5:165 – Concerto No. 151 for flute in G major
- QV 5:166 – Concerto No. 117 for flute in G major (lost)
- QV 5:167 – Concerto No. 81 for flute in G major
- QV 5:168 – Concerto No. 27 for flute in G major
- QV 5:169 – Concerto No. 128 for flute in G major
- QV 5:170 – Concerto No. 96 for flute in G major
- QV 5:171 – Concerto No. 107 for flute in G major (lost)
- QV 5:172 – Concerto No. 98 for flute in G major
- QV 5:173 – Concerto No. 84 for flute in G major (= Mus.ms 18 019/32 [No. 29])
- QV 5:174 – Concerto No. 161 for flute in G major
- QV 5:175 – Concerto No. 241 for flute in G major
- QV 5:176 – Concerto No. 136 for flute in G major
- QV 5:177 – Concerto No. 213 for flute in G major
- QV 5:178 – Concerto No. 104 for flute in G major
- QV 5:179 – Concerto No. 20 for flute in G major
- QV 5:180 – Concerto No. 192 for flute in G major
- QV 5:181 – Concerto No. 148 for flute in G major
- QV 5:182 – Concerto No. 283 for flute in G major
- QV 5:183 – Concerto No. 35 for flute in G major
- QV 5:184 – Concerto No. 58 for flute in G major
- QV 5:185 – Concerto No. 68 for flute in G major
- QV 5:186 – Concerto No. 177 for flute in G major
- QV 5:187 – Concerto No. 276 for flute in G major
- QV 5:188 – Concerto No. 66 for flute in G major
- QV 5:189 – Concerto No. 227 for flute in G major
- QV 5:190 – Concerto No. 206 for flute in G major
- QV 5:191 – Concerto No. 255 for flute in G major
- QV 5:192 – Concerto No. 297 for flute in G minor
- QV 5:193 – Concerto No. 132 for flute in G minor
- QV 5:194 – Concerto No. 234 for flute in G minor
- QV 5:195 – Concerto No. 248 for flute in G minor
- QV 5:196 – Concerto No. 262 for flute in G minor
- QV 5:197 – Concerto No. 115 for flute in G minor (lost)
- QV 5:198 – Concerto No. 169 for flute in G minor (lost)
- QV 5:199 – Concerto No. 52 for flute in G minor (lost)
- QV 5:200 – Concerto No. 290 for flute in G minor
- QV 5:201 – Concerto No. 185 for flute in G minor
- QV 5:202 – Concerto No. 43 for flute in G minor
- QV 5:203 – Concerto No. 220 for flute in G minor
- QV 5:204 – Concerto No. 150 for flute in G minor
- QV 5:205 – Concerto No. 19 for flute in G minor
- QV 5:206 – Concerto No. 97 for flute in G minor
- QV 5:207 – Concerto No. 199 for flute in G minor
- QV 5:208 – Concerto No. 269 for flute in G minor
- QV 5:209 – Concerto No. 67 for flute in A major
- QV 5:210 – Concerto No. 76 for flute in A major
- QV 5:211 – Concerto No. 242 for flute in A major
- QV 5:212 – Concerto No. 221 for flute in A major
- QV 5:213 – Concerto No. 125 for flute in A major
- QV 5:214 – Concerto No. 130 for flute in A major
- QV 5:215 – Concerto No. 214 for flute in A major
- QV 5:216 – Concerto No. 249 for flute in A major
- QV 5:217 – Concerto No. 186 for flute in A major
- QV 5:218 – Concerto No. 85 for flute in A major
- QV 5:219 – Concerto No. 64 for flute in A major (lost)
- QV 5:220 – Concerto No. 298 for flute in A major
- QV 5:221 – Concerto No. 270 for flute in A major
- QV 5:222 – Concerto No. 152 for flute in A major
- QV 5:223 – Concerto No. 200 for flute in A major
- QV 5:224 – Concerto No. 256 for flute in A major
- QV 5:225 – Concerto No. 111 for flute in A major
- QV 5:226 – Concerto No. 291 for flute in A major
- QV 5:227 – Concerto No. 263 for flute in A major
- QV 5:228 – Concerto No. 277 for flute in A major
- QV 5:229 – Concerto No. 170 for flute in A major (lost)
- QV 5:230 – Concerto No. 207 for flute in A major
- QV 5:231 – Concerto No. 235 for flute in A major
- QV 5:232 – Concerto No. 284 for flute in A major
- QV 5:233 – Concerto No. 149 for flute in A minor
- QV 5:234 – Concerto No. 162 for flute in A minor
- QV 5:235 – Concerto No. 105 for flute in A minor (lost)
- QV 5:236 – Concerto No. 193 for flute in A minor
- QV 5:237 – Concerto No. 228 for flute in A minor
- QV 5:238 – Concerto No. 123 for flute in A minor
- QV 5:239 – Concerto No. 34 for flute in A minor
- QV 5:240 – Concerto No. 179 for flute in A minor
- QV 5:241 – Concerto No. 49 for flute in A minor (lost)
- QV 5:242 – Concerto No. 16 for flute in A minor
- QV 5:243 – Concerto No. 9 for flute in B♭ major
- QV 5:244 – Concerto No. 243 for flute in B♭ major
- QV 5:245 – Concerto No. 180 for flute in B♭ major
- QV 5:246 – Concerto No. 133 for flute in B♭ major
- QV 5:247 – Concerto No. 163 for flute in B♭ major (lost)
- QV 5:248 – Concerto No. 106 for flute in B♭ major
- QV 5:249 – Concerto No. 124 for flute in B♭ major (lost)
- QV 5:250 – Concerto No. 51 for flute in B♭ major (lost)
- QV 5:251 – Concerto No. 278 for flute in B♭ major
- QV 5:252 – Concerto No. 257 for flute in B♭ major
- QV 5:253 – Concerto No. 155 for flute in B♭ major
- QV 5:254 – Concerto No. 215 for flute in B♭ major
- QV 5:255 – Concerto No. 208 for flute in B♭ major
- QV 5:256 – Concerto No. 271 for flute in B♭ major
- QV 5:257 – Concerto No. 229 for flute in B♭ major
- QV 5:258 – Concerto No. 292 for flute in B♭ major
- QV 5:259 – Concerto No. 194 for flute in B♭ major
- QV 5:260 – Concerto No. 299 for flute in B♭ major
- QV 5:261 – Concerto No. 65 for flute in B minor
- QV 5:262 – Concerto No. 77 for flute in B minor
- QV 5:263 – Concerto No. 5 for flute in B minor
- QV 5:264 – Concerto No. 250 for flute in B minor
- QV 5:265 – Concerto No. 61 for flute in B minor (lost)
- QV 5:266 – Concerto No. 120 for flute in B minor (lost)
- QV 5:267 – Concerto No. 47 for flute in B minor
- QV 5:268 – Concerto No. 141 for flute in B minor
- QV 5:269 – Concerto No. 145 for flute in B minor
- QV 5:270 – Concerto No. 99 for flute in B minor
- QV 5:271 – Concerto No. 201 for flute in B minor
- QV 5:272 – Concerto No. 187 for flute in B minor
- QV 5:273 – Concerto No. 56 for flute in B minor (lost)
- QV 5:274 – Concerto No. 264 for flute in B minor
- QV 5:275 – Concerto No. 285 for flute in B minor
- QV 5:276 – Concerto No. 74 for flute in B minor
- QV 5:277 – Concerto No. 171 for flute in B minor (lost)
- QV 5:278 – Concerto No. 18 for flute in B minor
- QV 5:279 – Concerto No. 46 for flute in B minor
- QV 5:280 – Concerto No. 222 for flute in B minor
- QV 5:281 – Concerto No. 236 for flute in B minor
- QV 5:Anh. 1 – Concerto for flute in C major
- QV 5:Anh. 2 – Concerto No. 86 for flute in C major
- QV 5:Anh. 3 – Concerto for flute in C major (lost)
- QV 5:Anh. 4 – Concerto for flute in C minor (lost)
- QV 5:Anh. 5 – Concerto No. 3 for flute in D major (lost)
- QV 5:Anh. 6 – Concerto for flute in D major
- QV 5:Anh. 7 – Concerto for flute in D major (lost)
- QV 5:Anh. 8 – Concerto for flute in D major
- QV 5:Anh. 9 – Concerto for flute in D major
- QV 5:Anh.10 – Concerto for flute in D major
- QV 5:Anh.11 – Concerto for oboe in D minor
- QV 5:Anh.12 – Concerto for horn in E♭ major (by Melchior Hoffmann)
- QV 5:Anh.13 – Concerto for horn in E♭ major
- QV 5:Anh.14 – Concerto for horn in E♭ major
- QV 5:Anh.15 – Concerto for flute in E minor
- QV 5:Anh.16 – Concerto for oboe in F major (lost)
- QV 5:Anh.17 – Concerto No. 2 for flute in G major
- QV 5:Anh.18 – Concerto for flute in G major
- QV 5:Anh.19 – Concerto for flute in G major
- QV 5:Anh.20 – Concerto for flute in G major
- QV 5:Anh.21 – Concerto for flute in G major (lost)
- QV 5:Anh.22 – Concerto for flute in G major
- QV 5:Anh.23 – Concerto for flute in A major (lost)
- QV 5:Anh.24 – Concerto No. 79 for flute in A major
- QV 5:Anh.25 – Concerto for oboe in B♭ major
- QV 5:Anh.26 – Concerto for flute in B minor

== Other orchestral works ==
- QV 6:1 – Concerto No. 60 for 2 flutes in D major
- QV 6:2 – Concerto for flute & violin in D major
- QV 6:3 – Concerto No. 59 for flute, oboe and violin in E minor
- QV 6:4 – Pastorale in G major
- QV 6:5 – Concerto No. 89 for 2 flutes in G major
- QV 6:6 – Concerto No. 4 a 10 in G major
- QV 6:7 – Concerto for 2 flutes in G major
- QV 6:8 – Concerto for 2 flutes in G minor
- QV 6:Anh.1 – Sinfonia in D major
- QV 6:Anh.2 – Concerto a 10 in G major

== Arias and songs ==
- QV 7: 1 – Aria for soprano: Sembra che il ruscelletto in D major
- QV 7: 2 – Aria for soprano: Padre perdona in E♭ major
- QV 7: 3 – Lied: Die Wahl einer Geliebten in C major
- QV 7: 4 – Lied: Die geliebte Verzweiflung in E♭ major
- QV 7: 5 – Lied: Die Vergötterung in G major
- QV 7: 6 – Lied: An eine kleine Schöne in G major
- QV 7: 7 – Lied: Das Pantheon in B♭ major
- QV 7: 8 – Lied: Der Durstige in B♭ major
- QV 7: 9 – Lied: Die Liebe der Feinde in C major
- QV 7:10 – Lied: Trost eines schwermüthigen Christen in C minor
- QV 7:11 – Lied: Das Gebet in D major
- QV 7:12 – Lied: Danklied in D major
- QV 7:13 – Lied: Auf die Himmelfahrt des Erlösers in D major
- QV 7:14 – Lied: Trost der Erlösung in D minor
- QV 7:15 – Lied: Von der Quelle der guten Werke in E♭ major
- QV 7:16 – Lied: Die Ehre Gottes aus der Natur in E major
- QV 7:17 – Lied: Zufriedenheit mit seinem Zustande in E minor
- QV 7:18 – Lied: Warnung vor der Wollust in F major
- QV 7:19 – Lied: Erweckung zur Busse in F major
- QV 7:20 – Lied: Das Glück eines guten Gewissens in F major
- QV 7:21 – Lied: Das natürliche Verderben des Menschen in F major
- QV 7:22 – Lied: Der Weg des Frommen in G major
- QV 7:23 – Lied: Beständige Erinnerung des Todes in G major
- QV 7:24 – Lied: Um Ergebung in den göttlichen Willen in G minor
- QV 7:25 – Lied: Die Güte Gottes in A major
- QV 7:26 – Lied: Demuth in A major
- QV 7:27 – Lied: Busslied in A minor
- QV 7:28 – Lied: Am Geburtstage in B♭ major
- QV 7:29 – Lied: Wider den ‹bermuth in B♭ major
- QV 7:30 – Lied: Gottes Macht und Vorsehung in B♭ major
- QV 7:Anh.1 – Lied: An eine kleine Schöne in E major
- QV 7:Anh.2 – Selig sind des Himmels Erben in C minor

== Recently discovered works ==
The six flute quartets were discovered, edited and recorded by Mary Oleskiewicz in the Sing-Akademie zu Berlin archives after they were returned to Germany in 2001.

- QV 4:8 – Flute Quartet No. 1 in D major
- QV 4:9 – Flute Quartet No. 2 in E minor
- QV 4:10 – Flute Quartet No. 3 in G major
- QV 4:11 – Flute Quartet No. 4 in G minor
- QV 4:12 – Flute Quartet No. 5 in C major
- QV 4:13 – Flute Quartet No. 6 in B minor
