= Carl Gotthelf Gerlach =

German organist, composer and violinist

Carl Gotthelf Gerlach (31 December 1704 – 9 July 1761) was a German organist, composer and violinist.

== Life ==
He was born in Calbitz, Wermsdorf, near Oschatz in the Electorate of Saxony. Gerlach became a pupil at the Thomasschule in Leipzig, receiving musical training between 1716 and 1723, as an alto singer, violinist and keyboard player, from the Thomaskantor Johann Kuhnau. When Johann Sebastian Bach succeeded Kuhnau in 1723, it is likely that he taught Gerlach. After leaving school, Gerlach assisted with musical duties in the two principal churches in Leipzig, the Nikolaikirche and the Thomaskirche, including acting as a copyist; he occasionally escorted Bach during his travels around Germany.

In 1727 he enrolled as a law student at Leipzig University. In 1729, on Bach's recommendation, he was appointed as musical director of the Neukirche, Leipzig, a post he occupied until his death. He temporarily took over from Bach as director of the Leipzig Collegium Musicum between spring 1737 and autumn 1739, becoming permanent director some time between 1741 and 1744. As a violinist, he became leader of the Grosse Konzert in 1743, financed by the Leipzig merchant class: it was a precursor of the Leipzig Gewandhaus.

In 1729, as Gerlach became more significant in musical circles, he received disproportionately more funding than Bach from the Leipzig city council; they preferred the progressive approach of the Neukirche to the traditional approach of the two main churches. Gerlach died in Leipzig after a long period of poor health, unmarried and heirless; his musical estate was purchased by the Breitkopf family, who later catalogued the large collection of manuscripts.
