= Melchior Hoffmann (composer) =

German composer (c. 1679–1715)

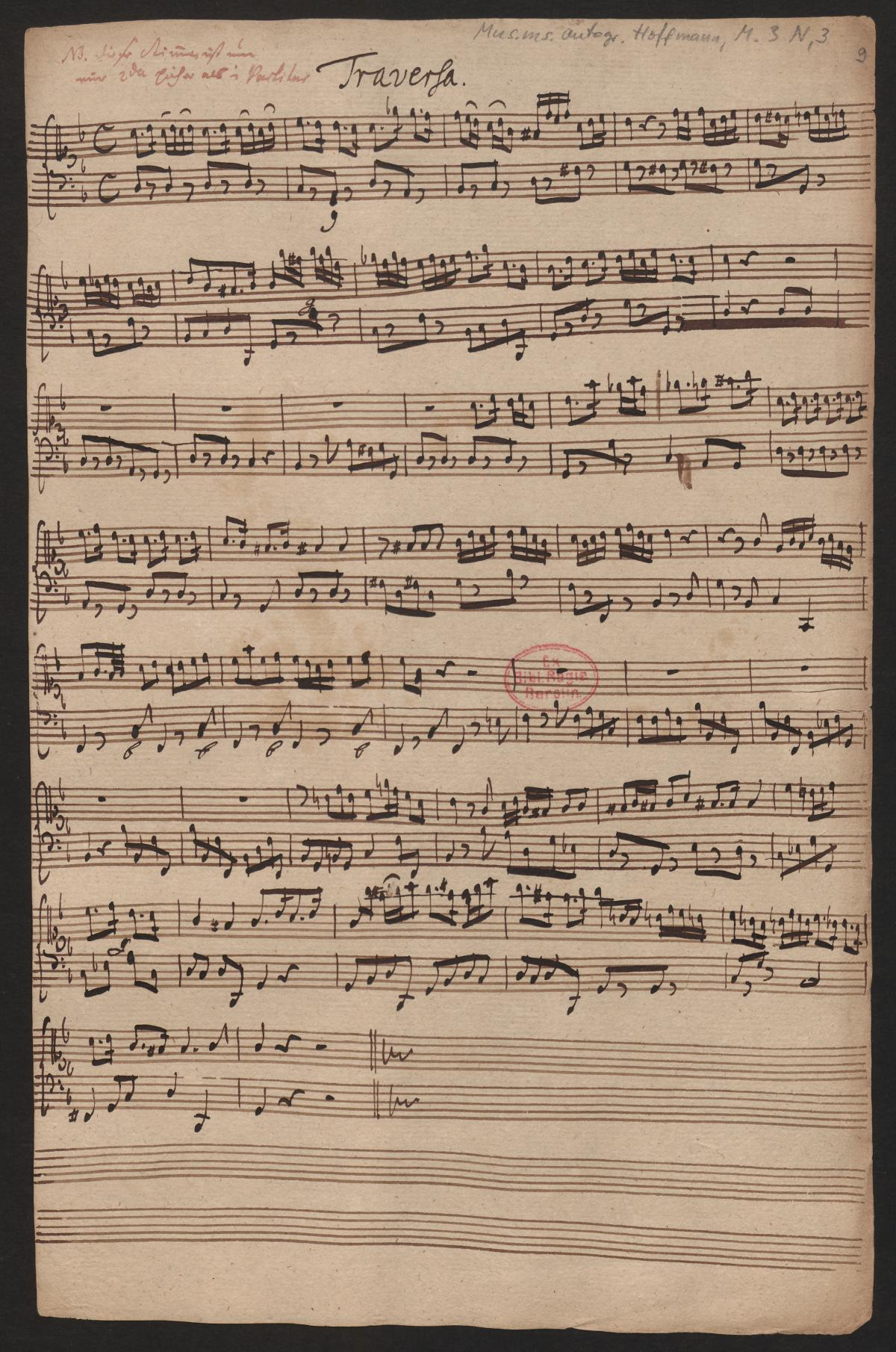
- Early 18th-century manuscript copy, likely written by Gottfried Heinrich Stölzel, of the "Traversa" part of Hoffmann's c. 1707 Magnificat in A minor (BWV Anh. 21, formerly attributed to Bach)
- Born: c1679 Bärenstein, now Altenberg, Saxony
- Died: 6 October 1715; Leipzig
- Other name: Georg Melchior Hoffmann
- Occupations: Composer; Educator
- Spouse: Margaretha Elisabeth Philipp

Georg Melchior Hoffmann (c. 1679 – 6 October 1715) was a Baroque composer who was influential as the leader at the Collegium Musicum in Leipzig. Some of his compositions have been mistaken for those of Johann Sebastian Bach.

== Biography ==
Hoffman was born sometime around 1679 (or 1685 according to some sources) in Bärenstein (now part of Altenberg), Saxony, Germany. His first musical service was as a choirboy in Dresden, under the tutelage of Johann Christoph Schmidt. In 1702 he moved to Leipzig to study law. Simultaneously he joined Georg Philipp Telemann at the Collegium Musicum in Leipzig and acted as the organization's copyist. Hoffmann succeeded Telemann as director of the Collegium Musicum in 1705, a position that did not end until Hoffman's death ten years later. In this position he became an educator, and his students included Gottfried Heinrich Stölzel. He was noted for expanding the orchestra at the Collegium to more than 40 musicians. Other responsibilities included being the organist at the Neukirche, and director of the Leipzig civic opera, for which he composed several works. He is known to have journeyed to England sometime around the years 1709–1710. In 1713 he began to suffer from the malady which would eventually prove fatal. He accepted a position as the organist at the Liebfrauenkirche at Halle in the spring of 1714, but resigned July 12 of that year having never served in that capacity. He married Margaretha Elisabeth Philipp on 9 September 1714. He succumbed to illness, in otherwise prosperous circumstances, on 6 October 1715.

== Compositions ==
Hoffmann's compositions have been mistaken for the work of J. S. Bach. Research has indicated that an aria for alto, Schlage doch, gewünschte Stunde, BWV 53, and the solo cantata for tenor, Meine Seele rühmt und preist, BWV 189, are likely works by Hoffmann, and of more positive identification is a Magnificat in A minor for solo soprano and small group, which during the 19th century was assigned a BWV number of BWV Anh. 21. He has been sometimes confused with composer Johann Georg Hoffmann, although there is no relation. None of his operas survive, but contemporary reviews indicate they were well received. He has been identified as the first composer to use bells in a serious manner.

=== Sacred music ===
Kyrie–Gloria Masses:

- Mass for vocal soloist and small orchestra:
  - Version in E minor: for bass, violin and continuo.
  - Version in A minor: for tenor (or soprano), violetta and continuo.
- Mass in C major (c. 1710).

Sanctuses:

- Sanctus in D major.
- Sanctus in A minor (c. 1708), for Purification.
- Sanctus in C major (c. 1710).

Meine Seele rühmt und preist
First movement

Fourth movement (Recitative) and fifth movement (Aria)
Sung by Max Meili; conducted by Curt Sachs; L'anthologie sonore No. 23 (1935)

Magnificats and church cantatas:

- Entfernet euch ihr schmeichlenden Gedanken, cantata for Annunciation.
- Meine Seele rühmt und preist, German Magnificat (paraphrase), cantata for Visitation, previously attributed to Johann Sebastian Bach (BWV 189) and to Johann Georg Hoffmann.
- Schlage doch gewünschte Stunde, aria, cantata for funeral, also attributed to Johann Sebastian Bach (BWV 53).
- Wie glücklich ist mein Herz das voller Lust und Scherz, cantata for Pentecost or for the second day of Christmas.
- Latin Magnificat in D minor (1700).
- German Magnificat in A minor (c. 1707), Meine Seele erhebt den Herren, previously attributed to Johann Sebastian Bach (BWV Anh. 21) and to Telemann (TWV 1:1748).
- Singet dem Herrn ein neues Lied (1708), Psalm 96, cantata for New Year's Day, previously attributed to Telemann (also TWV 1:1748, like the Magnificat in A minor).

=== Secular music ===
Arias and Operas:

- Aria "Schönste Lippen eure Liebe betet mit entzücktem Triebe"
- From Banise or Die asiatische Banise (III) or L'Idaspe fedele (libretto by/after Heinrich Anselm von Ziegler und Kliphausen: Die Asiatische Banise Oder, Das blutig- doch muthige Pegu, Leipzig 1689):
  - "Ritorna già nel viso"
  - "Sollen nun die grünen Jahre" – attribution doubtful.
  - "Vive sperando nell petto il core"
  - Aria (Act 1, Scene 2): Ich suche mein Leben wo soll ich es finden.
  - Sarabande (?Act 1, Scene 2) – attribution doubtful.
  - Aria (Act 1, Scene 7): "Kann man's närr'scher auch erdenken"
  - Aria (Act 1, Scene 9): "Non spero più di vivere lontana"
  - Aria (Act 2, Scene 11): "Mein Herze brennt vor Courage in meiner Brust schon lichterloh"
  - Duet (Act 3, Scene 7): "La costanza ... La speranza"
  - Aria (Act 3, Scene 12):
    - "Nichts ist süßer als die Liebe"
    - "Voglio partir contento"
- From Die amazonische Königin Orithya:
  - Aria (Act 1, Scene 3): "Denket nach ihr schönsten Lippen"
  - Aria (Act 2, Scene 8): "Es hilft dir wenig armes Herz"
- From Zenobia und Radamisto:
  - Aria (Act 1, Scene 5): "Co' bei concenti di mia zampogna"
  - Aria (Act 1, Scene 6): "Blast die Trompeten"
  - Aria (Act 2, Scene 1): "Accompagna il rossignolo il pastor" (?)
- From Xerxes (Michaelmas 1705):
  - "Ändert euch ihr harten Sinnen" – attribution doubtful.
- From Cyniras und Irene (Easter 1708):
  - "Meine Freiheit geht zu Grabe" – attribution doubtful.
- From Cosroes (Michaelmas 1708):
  - "Find ich denn durch meine Treue" – attribution doubtful.
- From Die über Hass und Rache triumphirende Liebe an dem grossmüthigen Exempel Pharamundi (Easter 1710):
  - "Weicht ihr Schmerzen aus den Herzen" – attribution doubtful.
- From Die rachgierige Nicea (Michaelmas 1710):
  - "Ich will euch küssen ich will euch drücken" – attribution doubtful.
  - "Unbeschreiblich ist mein Glücke" – attribution doubtful.
  - Aria (Act 1, Scene 10): "Ich will dir's nur gestehen du wirst mich niemals sehen" – also attributed to Telemann (TWV 21:149).
  - Aria (Act 1, Scene 14): "Könnt' ich den Geliebten sehen" – also attributed to Telemann (TWV 21:148).
  - Aria (Act 2, Scene 5): "Ihr holden Augen meiner Schönen ach schaut mich einmal gütig an" – also attributed to Telemann (TWV 21:153).
  - Aria (Act 3, Scene 1): "Ich will vergnügt mein Leben schließen" – also attributed to Telemann (TWV 21:147).
  - Aria (Act 3, Scene 13): "Du nennst mich ungerecht weil ich dich treu geliebt" – also attributed to Telemann (TWV 21:145).
  - Aria (Act 3, Scene 14): "Antwortet doch ihr schönsten Lippen" – also attributed to Telemann (TWV 21:151).
- From Balacin or Die asiatische Banise (I) (Easter 1712):
  - "Wo find' ich dich geliebtes Leben" – attribution doubtful.
  - Aria (Act 2, Scene 2):
    - "Es machen's ja die lieben Mädgens zu dieser Zeit recht kunterbunt"
    - "Sag indessen werte Schöne"
  - Aria (Act 2, Scene 3): "Bleib doch allerliebstes Leben"
  - Aria (Act 3, Scene 6): "Soll ich hoffen"
  - Adagio, recitative and aria (Act 3, Scene 10): "Banise auf bereite dich zum Sterben"; "Die Stunde schlägt nun muß ich scheiden"
- From Chaumigrim or Die asiatische Banise II (Easter 1712):
  - "Scheid' ich gleich anjetzt von hinnen" – attribution doubtful.
  - "Wenn die Mütter erst erfahren" – attribution doubtful.
  - Aria (Act 2, Scene 2): "Flieht ihr Seüffzer aus der Seelen"
  - Aria (Act 3, Scene 2): "Schlaf Scandor schlaf auf diesem Bettgestelle"
  - Aria (Act 3, Scene 10): "Ich will sengen, brennen, morden"
- From Echo und Narzissus (Michaelmas 1712):
  - "Ach komm und eile" – attribution doubtful.
  - "Frische Blätter grüne Zweige" – attribution doubtful.
- From Ismenie und Montaldo (New Year 1713):
  - "Mein liebster Schatz mein ander Herze" – attribution doubtful.
  - "Wenn unsre Mienen freundlich geschienen" – attribution doubtful.
- From Ademarus (Easter 1713):
  - "Dir zu Liebe will ich leben schönster Engel" – attribution doubtful.
  - "Du hast in Lieben wenig Glücke" – attribution doubtful.
  - "Herr Niso lässt das Ding wohl bleiben" – attribution doubtful.
  - "Küsse mich mein wertes Leben" – attribution doubtful.
  - Aria (Act 1, Scene 1): "Dies ist der schönste Saft der Reben"
  - Aria (Act 1, Scene 2): "Im Friede zu lieben im Kriege zu streiten"
- From Rhea Sylvia (Easter 1714; libretto by Johann Ulrich von König):
  - "Endlich zeiget mir das Glücke" – attribution doubtful.
  - "Ich will euch küssen liebste Wangen" – attribution doubtful.
  - Aria "Quel d'amore è un certo malo che lo intendoe"
  - Aria "Viva eterna la mia face si che il ciel si girera"
  - Aria (Act 1, Scene 10): "Sarò immobile al martoro"
  - Aria (Act 1, Scene 16): "Die Liebe zeigt dir schon von ferne"
  - Aria (Act 3, Scene 5): "Per uscir di prigionia"

Cantatas (at least in part based on operas):

- Auf muntre Sinnen zum Jagen – attribution doubtful.
- Himmel laß mich doch erlangen – attribution doubtful.
- Ich lebe als im Schlafe und weiß nicht was ich tu'.
- Treue Liebe edler Seelen.
- Verfolge mich immer mit rasenden Stürmen.

Concerto:

- Horn concerto in E-flat major, previously attributed to Johann Joachim Quantz (QV 5:Anh.12).

Trio sonata:

- Sonata in G minor for oboe, violin and continuo.

== Reception ==
Joshua Rifkin has identified Hoffman's style as having "freshness and charm" while noting the "occasional melodic angularity".

=== Recordings ===
German Magnificat in A minor
See Magnificat in A minor (Hoffmann) § Recordings
Meine Seele rühmt und preist
See Meine Seele rühmt und preist, BWV 189 § Recordings
Schlage doch, gewünschte Stunde
See Schlage doch, gewünschte Stunde, BWV 53 § Recordings
Operas
Banise
- "Schlaf, Scandon, schlaf", "Schöne Mädgen bringen Schwäger" and "Wenn die Mütter erst erfahren" recorded by the United Continuo Ensemble in 2010.
Echo und Narcissus
- "Ach, komm und eile" and "Frische Blätter, grüne Zweige" recorded by the United Continuo Ensemble in 2010.
Ismenie und Montaldo
- "Verlass mich nicht, mein liebstes Leben" recorded by the United Continuo Ensemble in 2010.
Rhea Sylvia
- "Ich will euch küssen" recorded by the United Continuo Ensemble in 2010.

== Sources ==
- Glöckner, Andreas (1983). "Die Leipziger Neukirchenmusik und das "Kleine Magnificat" BWV Anh. 21" [The music for the New Church in Leipzig and the "Little Magnificat" BWV Anh. 21]. In Schulze, Hans-Joachim; Wolff, Christoph (eds.). Bach-Jahrbuch 1982 [Bach Yearbook 1982]. Bach-Jahrbuch (in German). Vol. 68. Neue Bachgesellschaft. Berlin: Evangelische Verlagsanstalt. pp. 97–102. doi:10.13141/bjb.v1982. ISSN 0084-7682.
