= Director musices =

Director musices, Latin for director of music, was a title held by music directors especially at European universities or cathedrals; sometimes also at cathedral schools. The title is still used at universities in Sweden. In Finland it is an honorary award granted by the President of the Republic.

Today directores musices are primarily responsible for music activities at a university and choral and/or orchestra conductors.

== Swedish universities with director musices positions ==
- Uppsala University, since 1620
- Lund University, since 1748
- Linköping University, since 1993
- Umeå University, since 2000
- Royal Institute of Technology, since 2002
- Örebro University, since 2003
- Linnaeus University, since 2010

== Directores musices ==
- Johann Sebastian Bach, "Cantor zu St. Thomae et Director Musices Lipsiensis"
- Johann Christian Friedrich Hæffner, Uppsala University 1808–1833
- Wilhelm Stenhammar, Uppsala University 1909
- Hugo Alfvén, Uppsala University 1910–1939
- Lars-Erik Larsson, Uppsala University 1961–1965

== See also ==
- Kapellmeister
- Director of Music
