= Meine Seele rühmt und preist, BWV 189 =

Church cantata

Meine Seele rühmt und preist
- Church cantata by Melchior Hoffmann (likely)
- Catalogue: BWV 189; formerly attributed to Johann Sebastian Bach
- Genre: Solo cantata

Meine Seele rühmt und preist (My soul extols and praises), BWV 189, is a church cantata credited to Johann Sebastian Bach and Melchior Hoffmann.

== History and text ==
This is a solo cantata composed for the Feast of the Visitation of Mary. The prescribed readings for the day were Isaiah 11:1–5, and Luke 1:39–56. The librettist of the work is unknown. The German text of the cantata is a paraphrase of the Magnificat.

An old largely lost source attributes the cantata to Melchior Hoffmann (although seemingly confusing the composer with Johann Georg Hoffmann, an organist in Breslau). Throughout the 19th century the cantata was generally attributed to Bach. Only in the second half of the 20th century was the attribution restored to Melchior Hoffmann again in most sources.

== Movements and scoring ==
The work in five movements is scored for solo tenor voice, two recorders, oboe, violin, and basso continuo.

1. Aria "Meine Seele rühmt und preist"
2. Recitative "Denn seh' ich mich und auch mein Leben an"
3. Aria "Gott hat sich hoch gesetzet"
4. Recitative "O wass vor grosse Dinge treff ich an allen Orten an"
5. Aria "Deine Güte, dein Erbarmen"

== Recordings ==
Meine Seele rühmt und preist, BWV 189
First movement

Fourth movement (Recitative) and fifth movement (Aria)
Sung by Max Meili; conducted by Curt Sachs; L'anthologie sonore No. 23 (1935)

- Curt Sachs ensemble, Max Meili. L'anthologie Sonore, 1935.
- Paris Conservatory Orchestra, Charles Munch. Charles Munch, Vol. 2. Disque Gramophone, 1941.
- Bach-Orchester Stuttgart, Hans Grischkat. J.S. Bach: Cantatas BWV 51 & BWV 189. Renaissance, 1951.
- Orchestre de Chambre "Pro Arte" de Munich, Kurt Redel. J.S. Bach: Cantatas Nos. 189 · 89 · 174. Erato, 1956.
- Ernst Haefliger soloist, Münchner Bach-Orchester, Karl Richter, Kantaten BWV 55 & BWV 189, Archiv-Produktion 1959
- Peter Schreier soloist and conductor, Festival Strings Lucerne, "Bach Kantaten fur Tenor" Ariola-Eurodisc 1976
- Kammerorchester Carl Philipp Emanuel Bach, Peter Schreier. J.S. Bach: Solo-Kantaten und Arien. Philips, 1994.
- Members of Schola Cantorum Basiliensis, Nicolai Gedda (1971). Les introuvables de Nicolai Gedda. EMI Classics, 1995
- Helmut Müller-Brühl, conducting Markus Schäfer and the Cologne Chamber Orchestra (2004).
