= Max Meili =

Swiss tenor

Max Meili: Meine Seele rühmt und preist (Cantata No. 189 (BWV 189)), Johann Sebastian Bach, 1935

Max Meili, a Swiss tenor, was born 11 December 1899 in Winterthur and died 17 March 1970 in Zürich, Switzerland. He first trained as a painter then turned to singing, leading to lessons with Felix von Kraus.

Meili was mainly a concert singer, concentrating on music from the time of Bach and before, then just beginning to experience a revival of public interest; he was recognized as a specialist in medieval vocal music. His appearances at the Salzburg Festival in 1936 and 1937 were as a recitalist. One of Meili's rare appearances in opera involved music at an extreme remove from his usual repertory; in May 1931 he participated in the premiere of Alois Hába's opera Die Mutter at the Gärtnerplatztheater in Munich, Germany. Ten years later, on 15 January 1941, Meili sang Addio terra, addio cielo from Monteverdi's L'Orfeo at the funeral service of James Joyce at Zürich's Fluntern Cemetery.

Meili's recordings from the 78 RPM era included Renaissance lute songs recorded for His Master's Voice (issued in the United States by Victor) and early music released on L'Anthologie Sonore. He continued to record into the LP era, among other things appearing in the title role in the first post-World War II recording of Monteverdi’s L'Orfeo, taped by the Berlin Radio in the late 1940s and released by American Vox. By this time, however, critics began to note a decline in his voice.

Meili was a founding member of the Schola Cantorum Basiliensis in 1933. In 1955 he founded the Collegium Cantorum Turicense, which he directed in music of Monteverdi and Heinrich Schütz.
