= St. Matthew, Leipzig =

St. Matthew
- Barfüßerkirche; Neukirche; Matthäikirche
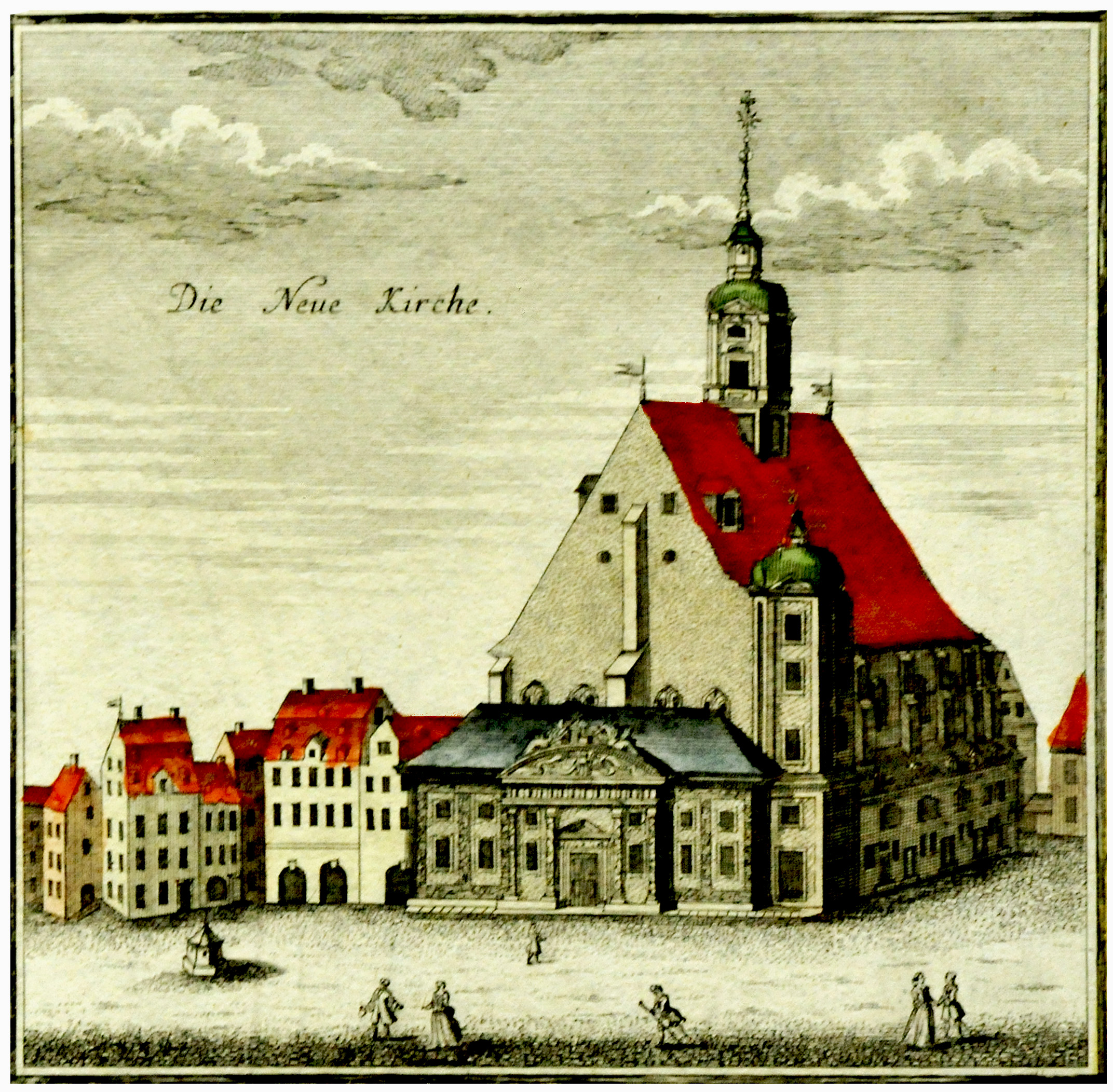
- Neukirche in 1749
- St. Matthew
- 51°20′29″N 12°22′16″E
- Denomination: Lutheran
- Previous denomination: Catholic

History
- Dedication: Holy Spirit (when Catholic)
- Consecrated: 1488

Architecture
- Style: Gothic
- Demolished: 4 December 1943

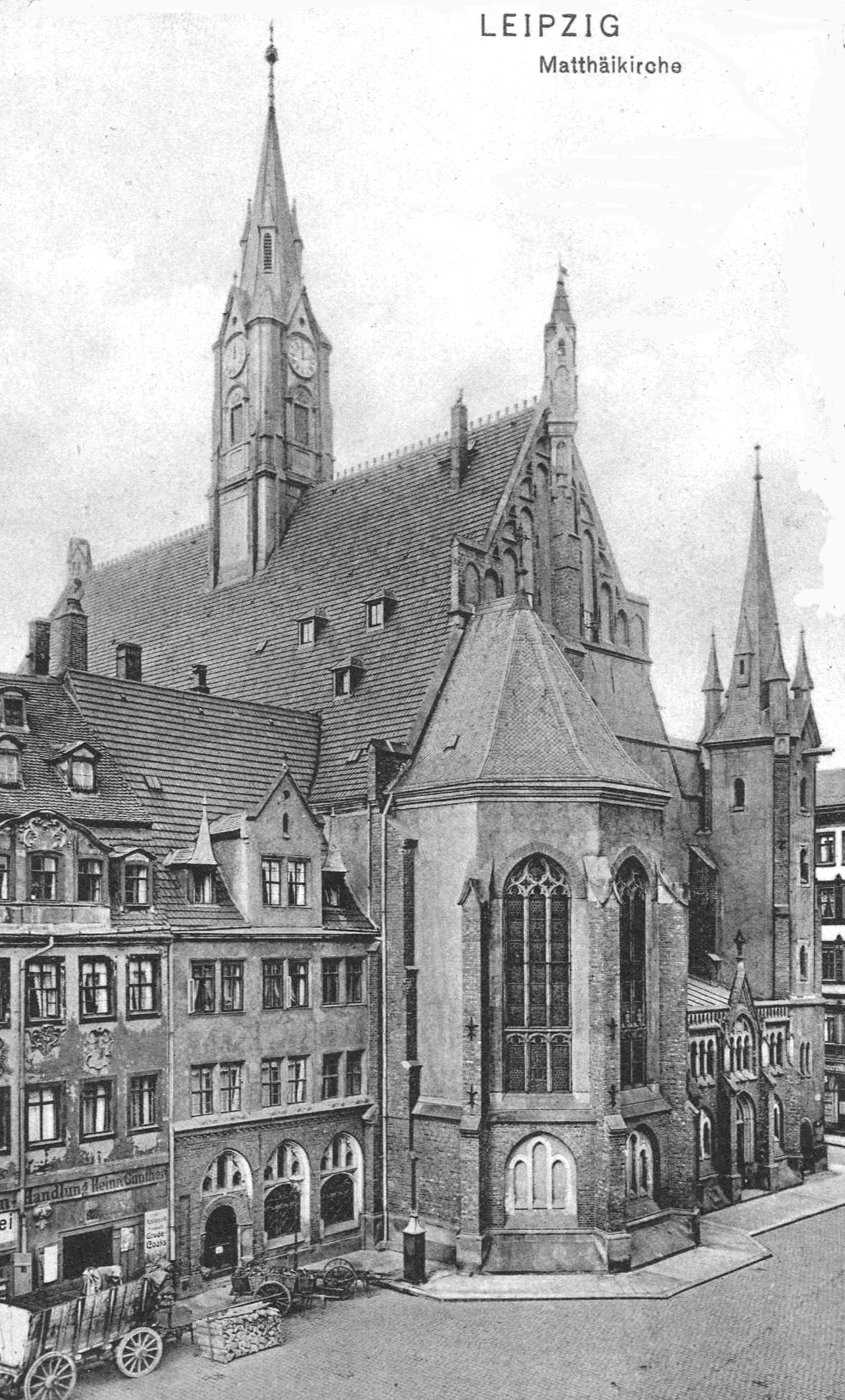
Matthäikirche c. 1912

St. Matthew was a church in the old town of Leipzig. During its history it had several names and functions. As a church of the Franciscan order, built in 1488, it was known as Barfüßerkirche and Heiliggeistkirche. It served as a Lutheran church, known as Neukirche, from 1699. A new congregation formed in 1876 and named the church Matthäikirche (St. Matthew). The building was destroyed in a bombing in 1943.

== Franciscan church ==
The church was built from 1488 for the Franciscan order Barfüßer ("Barefeet") and known as the Barfüßerkirche. It enlarged earlier church buildings dating back to the 1230s. It was dedicated in 1502 to the Holy Spirit and therefore also called Franziskanerkirche zum Heiligen Geist and Heiliggeistkirche. After the Reformation, the building served as storage for merchandise from 1552 to 1699.

== Neukirche ==
The church was remodeled in 1699 in Baroque style as the fourth Lutheran church in Leipzig, known as Neukirche or Neue Kirche (New church). The altar was created by Michael Hoppenhaupt. The church was dedicated on 24 September 1699. An organ was built in 1704 by Christoph Donat. Georg Philipp Telemann was the musical director from 1704, succeeded by Melchior Hoffmann in June 1705, and from 1720 by Georg Balthasar Schott. From 1723, the church music was supervised by the Thomaskantor (director of church music in Leipzig), then Johann Sebastian Bach, with the third choir of the Thomanerchor singing, while the first choirs performed in the main churches Thomaskirche (St. Thomas) and Nikolaikirche (St. Nicholas).

The building served as a prison in 1806 during the War of the Fourth Coalition, and from 1813 as a hospital.

== Matthäikirche ==
In 1876 a new congregation formed and named the church Matthäikirche (St. Matthew), after remodeling in Gothic revival style by Oskar Mothes. It was restructured again by Julius Zeißig from 1892 to 1894.

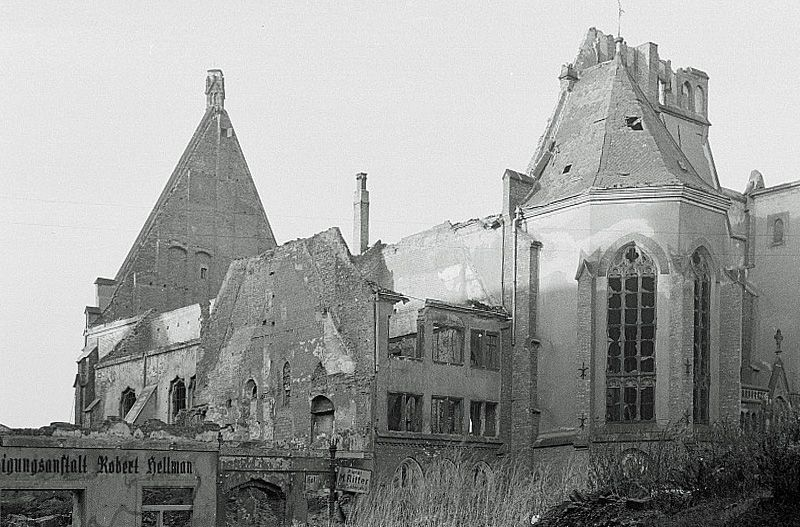
Ruins after the bombing

The church was destroyed during the Bombing of Leipzig on 4 December 1943.

== Bibliography ==
- Bärwald, Manuel; Koska, Bernd (4 September 2012). "Das Forschungsprojekt "Johann Sebastian Bachs Thomaner"" (in German). L.I.S.A der Gerda Henkel-Stiftung.
- Petzoldt, Martin (2013). "Liturgy and Music in Leipzig's Main Churches" (PDF) (in German). bach-cantatas.com.
- Sadie, Stanley; Tyrrell, John, eds. (2001). The New Grove Dictionary of Music and Musicians. Vol. 11 (2 ed.). New York: Grove's Dictionaries, Inc.
- Wolff, Christoph (2002). Johann Sebastian Bach: The Learned Musician. W. W. Norton & Company. ISBN 978-0-393-32256-9.
- "Klosterkirche zum Heiligen Geist" (in German). Leipzig-Lexikon.
- "Matthäikirche" (in German). Leipzig-Lexikon.
- "Telemann-Biographie in Stichpunkten" (in German). Telemann, Dokumente, Texte, Materialien.
- Cornelius Gurlitt: Matthäikirche. In: Beschreibende Darstellung der älteren Bau- und Kunstdenkmäler des Königreichs Sachsen, 17. Volume: Stadt Leipzig (I. Theil). C. C. Meinhold, Dresden, 1895, p. 140.
- Cornelius Gurlitt: Barfüsserkloster. In: Beschreibende Darstellung der älteren Bau- und Kunstdenkmäler des Königreichs Sachsen, 17. Volume: Stadt Leipzig (I. Theil). C. C. Meinhold, Dresden, 1895, p. 239.
- Kirchen in Leipzig. Schriften des Leipziger Geschichtsvereins 2/1993. Sax-Verlag, Beucha 1993
- Heinrich Magirius (u.a.). Stadt Leipzig. Die Sakralbauten. Mit einem Überblick über die städtebauliche Entwicklung von den Anfängen bis 1989. vol 1. Dt. Kunstverlag, München 1995, p. 679-697
