= Organ Sonatas (Bach) =

1720s works by Johann Sebastian Bach

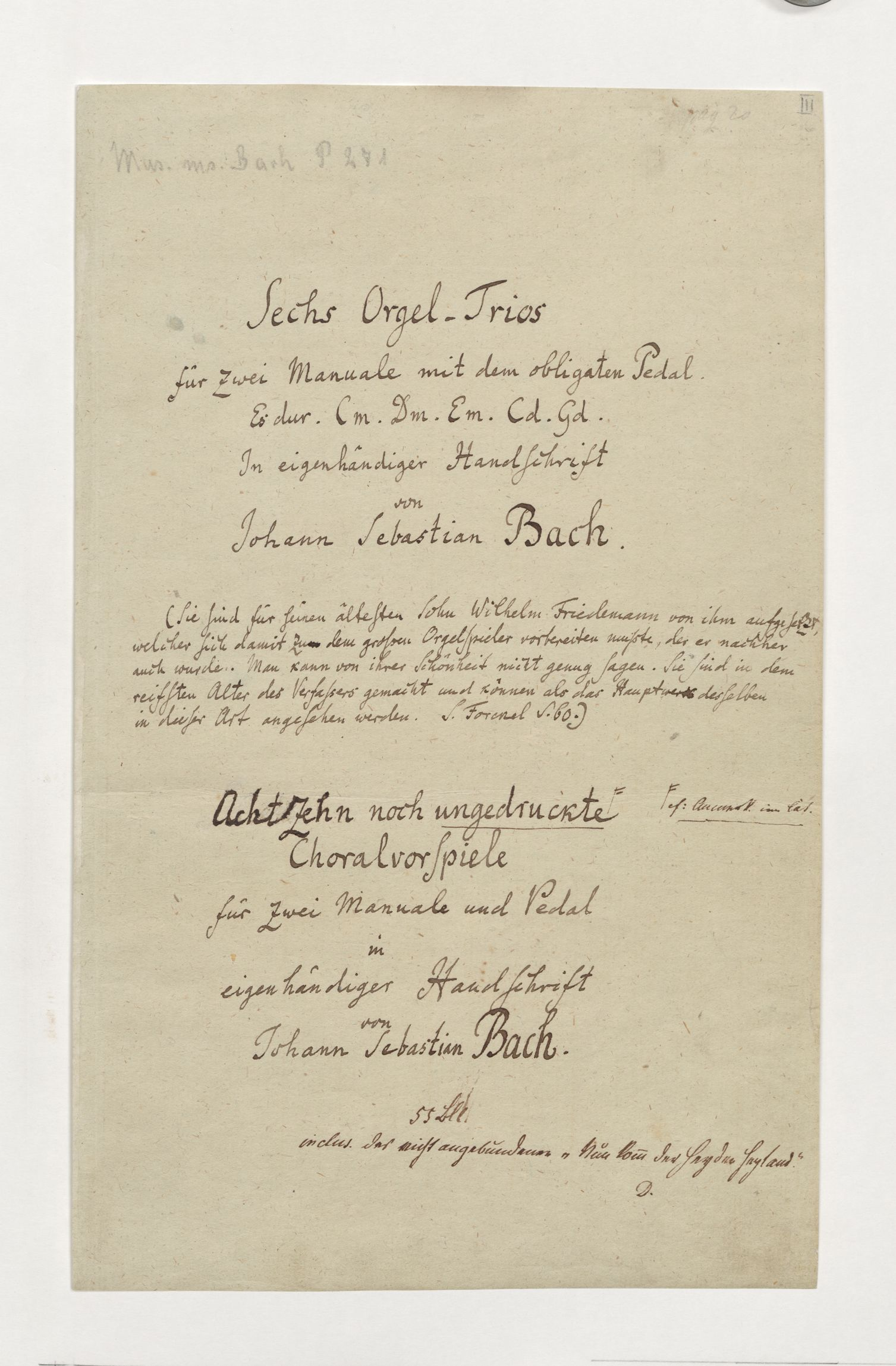
Covering page for the autograph manuscript of the organ sonatas, written some years later by the musician Georg Poelchau

The organ sonatas, BWV 525–530 by Johann Sebastian Bach are a collection of six sonatas in trio sonata form. Each sonata has three movements, with three independent parts in the two manuals and obbligato pedal. The collection is generally regarded as one of Bach's masterpieces for organ. The sonatas are also considered to be amongst his most difficult compositions for the instrument.

The collection was assembled in Leipzig in the late 1720s and contained reworkings of prior compositions by Bach from earlier cantatas, organ works, and chamber music as well as some newly composed movements. The sixth sonata, BWV 530, is the only one for which all three movements were specially composed for the collection.

When played on an organ, the second manual part is often played an octave lower on the keyboard with appropriate registration. Commentators have suggested that the collection might partly have been intended for private study to perfect organ technique, some pointing out that its compass allows it to be played on a pedal clavichord.

== Origins and purpose ==
=== Instructional manual ===
Sechs Sonaten oder Trio für zwey Claviere mit dem obligaten Pedal. Bach hat sie für seinen ältesten Sohn, Wilh. Friedemann, aufgesetzt, welcher sich damit zu dem großen Orgelspieler vorbereiten musste, der er nachher geworden ist. Man kann von ihrer Schönheit nicht genug sagen. Sie sind in dem reifsten Alter des Verfassers gemacht, und können als das Hauptwerk desselben in dieser Art angesehen werden

— Ueber Johann Sebastian Bachs Leben, Kunst und Kunstwerke, Johann Nikolaus Forkel, Leipzig, 1802

The organ sonatas were first gathered together in Leipzig in an autograph manuscript which Bach scholars have dated to a period roughly between 1727 and 1730. Apart from the heading with the numbering of the six sonatas and an indication of where the manuscript ends, Bach himself left no further specifications. After Bach's death, the musician Georg Poelchau (1773–1836) produced a covering page for the collection (along with the Great Eighteen Chorale Preludes) with a title and commentary.

The sonatas were described by Bach's biographer Johann Nikolaus Forkel as follows:

Six sonatas or trios for two keyboards with obbligato pedal. Bach composed them for his eldest son, Willhelm Friedemann, who, by practising them, prepared himself to be the great organist he later became. It is impossible to say enough about their beauty. They were written when the composer was in his full maturity and can be considered his principal work of this kind.

Poelchau's commentary on the covering page is a direct quotation of this passage from Forkel.

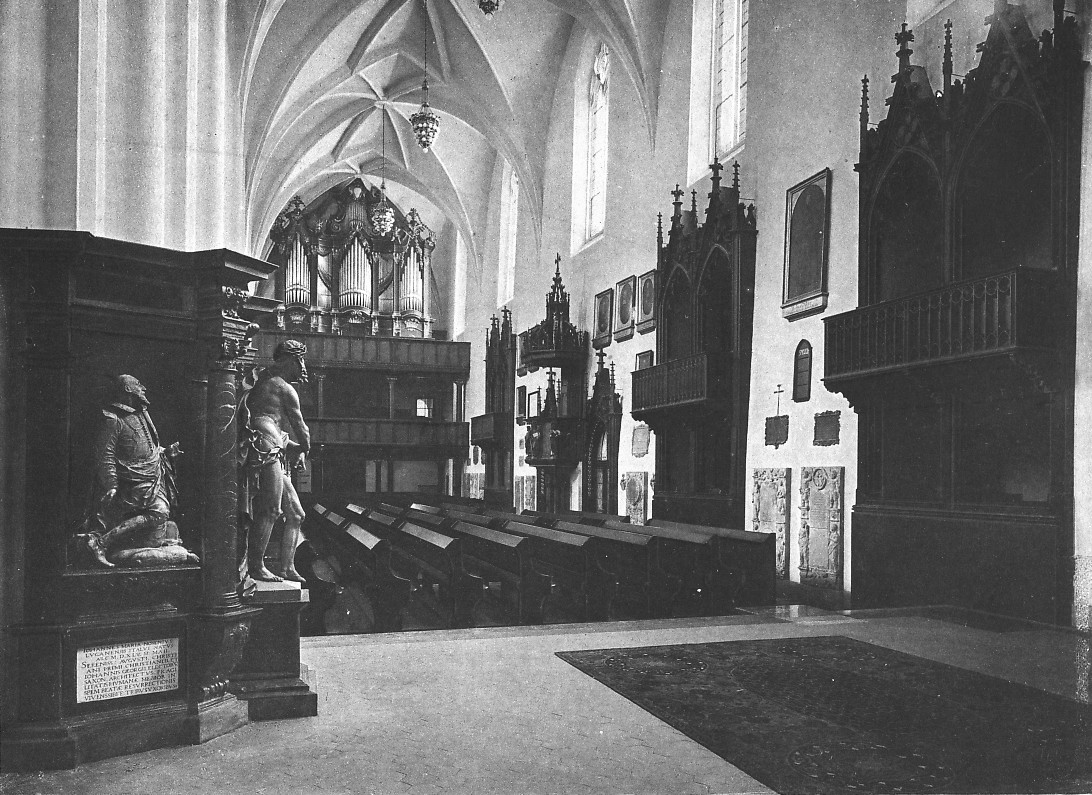
Silbermann Organ (1718–1720) in the Sophienkirche, where Wilhelm Friedemann Bach became organist in 1733

The organ sonatas represent the culmination of Bach's collections of keyboard works with a partly didactic purpose, from the point of both playing and composition. Although intended initially for Bach's eldest son Wilhelm Friedemann Bach, they also became part of the staple repertoire of his students. The keyboard collections include the Orgelbüchlein, the two and three part inventions, the first book of The Well-Tempered Clavier, the French Suites, and the Six Partitas (Clavier–Übung I).

Two main sources are known for the collection of sonatas. The first autograph score—possibly not the original composing score—is on paper with a watermark that allows it to be dated to the period 1727–1730. The second "fair copy" was started by Wilhelm Friedemann and completed by Bach's second wife Anna Magdalena. In addition, there are numerous other later copies by the circle of Bach, including copies of the first movement of BWV 527 and the slow movement of BWV 529 made by Bach's former pupil from Weimar, Johann Caspar Vogler. From these surviving manuscripts of the collection and the circumstances surrounding its composition—including Wilhelm Friedemann's future career (as a law student in Leipzig and then as organist of the Sophienkirche in Dresden) and Bach's renewed interest in the obbligato organ in his third cycle of cantatas—the date when the collection was compiled can be roughly set at a time between 1727 and 1730, although without any precision.

=== Genesis of collection ===
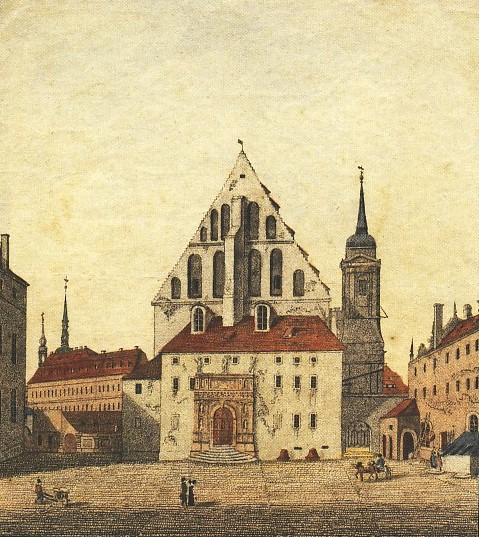
Sophienkirche, Dresden, 1800

From the two main sources, from Bach's knowledge of works by other composers and from his own compositions for organ and instrumental ensemble that predate the collection, it is possible to gain a partial idea of how the collection was put together and how the genre of the Bach organ trio evolved.

Some of the movements had precursors either as organ works or chamber works: only the last sonata BWV 530 had all its movements newly composed. The only other movements that are known with certainty to have been newly composed are the slow movement of BWV 525 and the first movement of BWV 529; the last movement of BWV 529 probably also falls into this category but might be a transcription of a lost instrumental trio sonata from Bach's periods in Cöthen and Weimar. Although Hans Eppstein has suggested that several movements might be transcriptions of lost chamber works, the writing for organ is often so idiosyncratic that his hypothesis can apply to at most a few movements.

There are six movements known with reasonable certainty to date from earlier compositions.

Four movements have previous versions as organ compositions:

- the first movement of BWV 525;
- the first movement of BWV 527;
- the slow movement of BWV 528;
- the slow movement of BWV 529.

Two movements are known to be transcriptions of instrumental trios:

- The slow movement of the BWV 527 is a reworking of a lost instrumental work which was also re-used later in the slow movement of the triple concerto for flute, violin and harpsichord, BWV 1044. This arrangement has been ascribed to the period 1729–1740 when Bach was director of the Collegium Musicum in Leipzig, an association of town musicians that mounted concerts in the Café Zimmermann.
- The first movement of BWV 528 is a transcription of the sinfonia that begins the second part of the cantata Die Himmel erzählen die Ehre Gottes, BWV 76, scored for oboe d'amore, viola da gamba and continuo. Bach (2013), designated BWV 528a, is a reconstruction of an entire trio sonata for the same combination of instruments using the remaining two movements. The lost work is thought to date to Bach's period in Weimar. Pieter Dirksen's edition allows the performers a choice of three possible keys: G minor; E minor; or a mixture of the two.

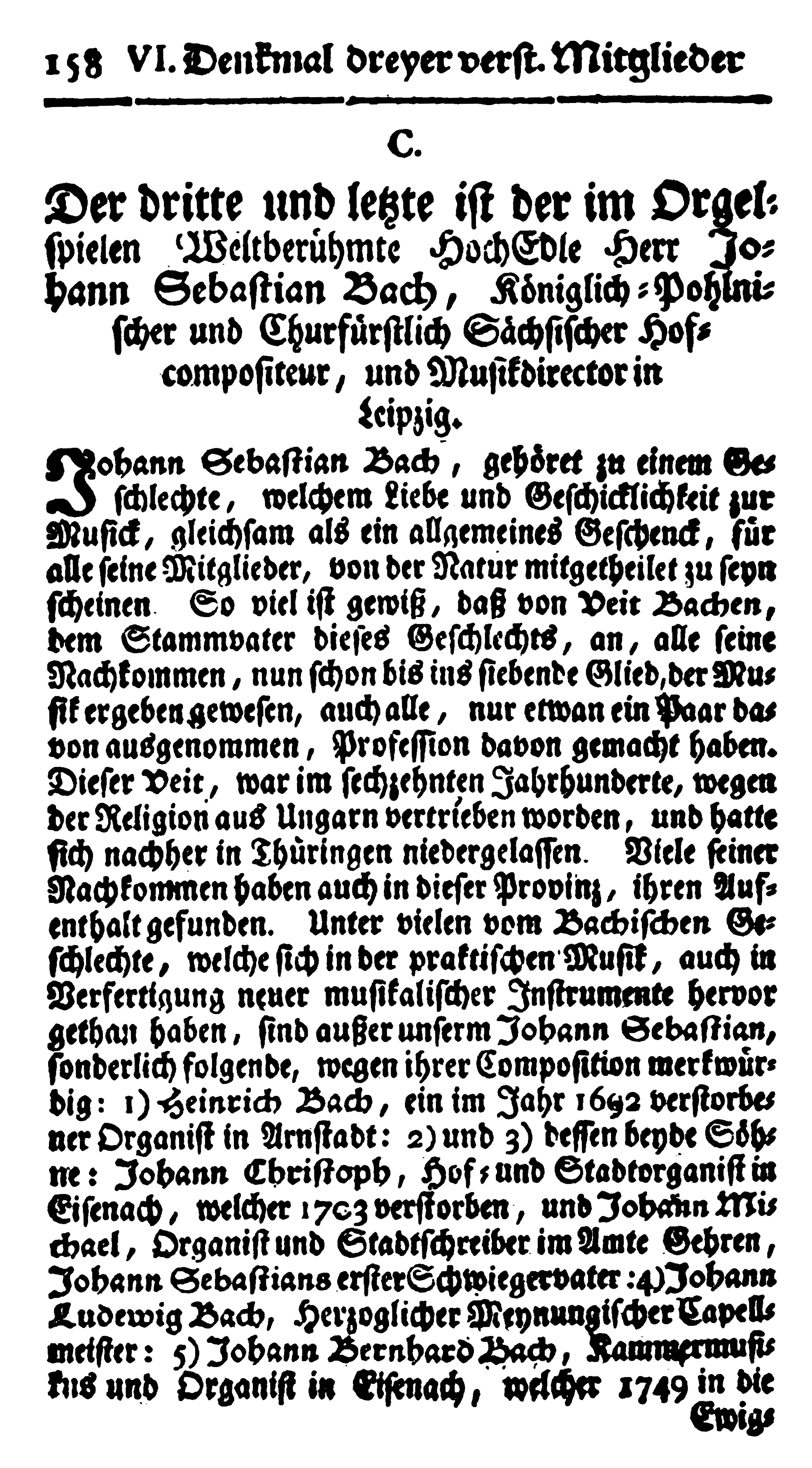
The first page of Bach's Nekrolog in Mizler's Musikalische Bibliothek, 1754

Some individual movements were associated with other organ works of Bach: the earlier version of the slow movement of BWV 529—the most elaborate and skillfully written of the slow movements—was paired with the Prelude and Fugue in C major, BWV 545; and the last movement of BWV 528 was paired with the Prelude and Fugue in G major, BWV 541. It is now thought that these pairings originated in Bach's Leipzig period. One problem in deciding how the collection came about is that many instrumental works on which the organ sonatas might have been based have been lost. Such chamber works are mentioned by Carl Philipp Emanuel Bach in his 1754 Nekrolog and many are thought to have been composed in Cöthen. Wolff (1994) has suggested this might reflect the fact that, after Bach's death, his vocal works passed to Wilhelm Friedemann and Carl Philipp Emanuel who guaranteed their survival; while the chamber works, very few of which survive, were mostly inherited by Bach's younger sons Johann Christian Bach and Johann Christoph Friedrich Bach.

Corrections in the autograph manuscript and a detailed analysis of stylistic elements in the sonatas have led Breig (1999) to suggest that the sonatas were composed in their final state in two distinct groups. The first group, consisting of the first, third and fourth sonatas, has first and last movements which have a fugal character and as close stylistic relation. The second group, consisting of the second, fifth and sixth sonatas where the bulk of composing corrections occur have a concerto-like form, with contrasting tutti and concertato sections in the opening movements and fugal final movements. Even in the second "fair copy" produced by Wilhelm Friedemann and Anna Magdalena, Bach made corrections in three movements (in the first, fifth and sixth sonatas).

=== Origins of organ trio ===
The Sonatas make a world of their own, as distinctive and accomplished as the first movements of Leipzig cantatas or the preludes and fugues of The Well-Tempered Clavier I. The two hands are not merely imitative but so planned as to give a curious satisfaction to the player, with phrases answering each other and syncopations dancing from hand to hand, palpable in a way not quite known even to two violinists. Melodies are bright or subdued, long or short, jolly or plaintive, instantly recognizable for what they are, and so made (as the ear soon senses) to be invertible. Probably the technical demands on the player also contribute to their unique aura.

— Williams (2003, p. 9)

Although Bach created a unique compositional genre in this collection of sonatas, the roots of the organ trio can be traced back to the works of earlier composers and some of Bach's own earlier compositions for organ. Bach had in his possession many organ works by seventeenth century French organists such as Boyvin, Clérambault, Grigny, Lebègue and Raison who wrote trios, trios en dialogue and trios à trois claviers for two manuals and pedal, with distinctive registrations for each manual keyboard. Bach's sonatas however, with their binary or ritornello form, owe very little to these French organ trios.

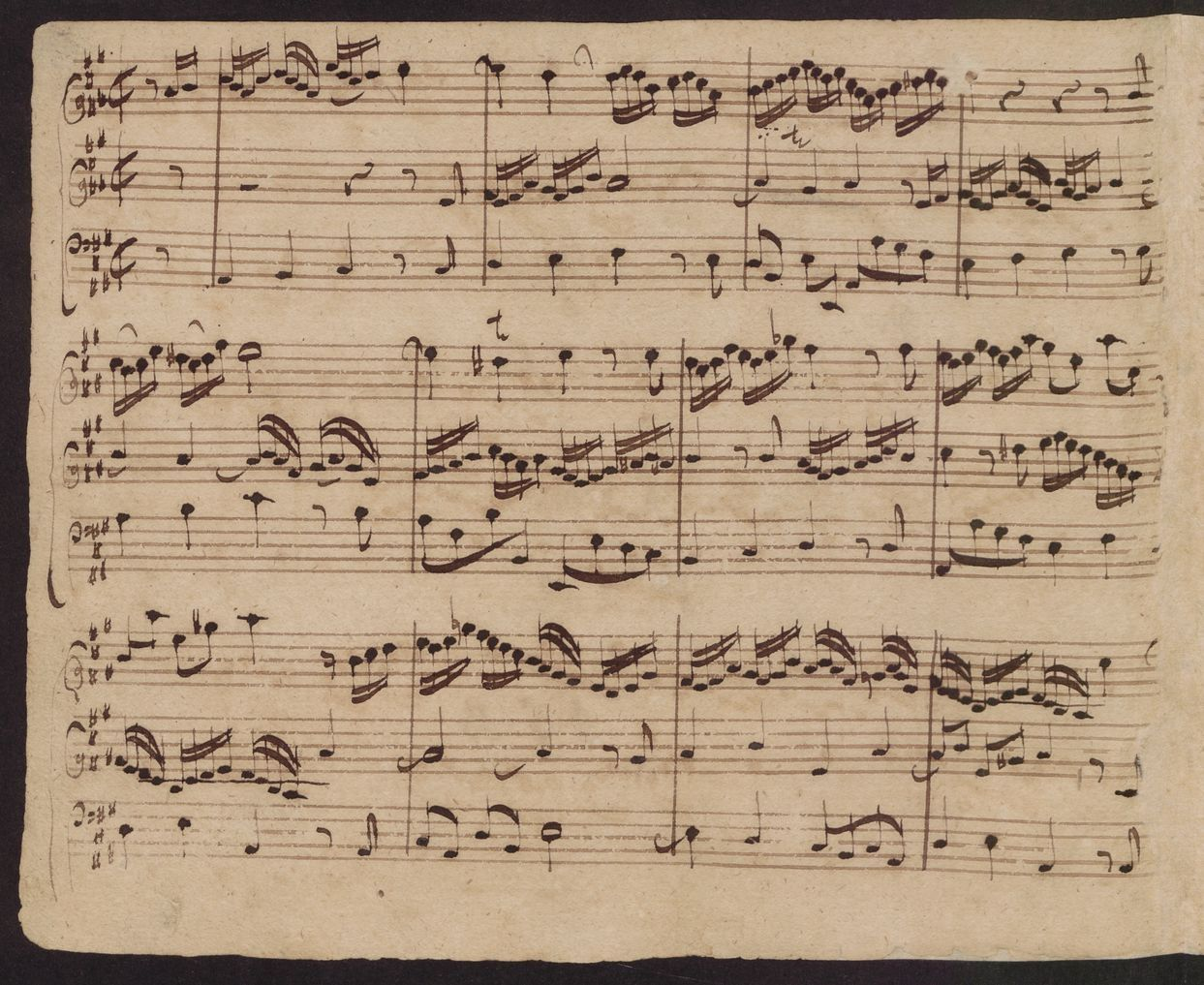
Allein Gott in der Höh' sei Ehr, BWV 664a, in hand copy by Johann Tobias Krebs

Earlier models for Bach's type of organ trio occurred in the first versions of the trios in the Great Eighteen Chorale Preludes, particularly Allein Gott in der Höh' sei Ehr, BWV 664a, and Herr Jesu Christ, dich zu uns wend, BWV 655a. Both these chorale preludes were written towards the end of Bach's years in Weimar. Both BWV 664a and BWV 655a follow the pattern of the Italian trio sonata for two violins involving invertible counterpoint. In a more rudimentary form, trios of this kind already appeared in German organ music in a few of the freely composed chorale preludes of Buxtehude, van Noordt, Armsdorff, and Georg Böhm, Bach's teacher from Lüneburg. In the two chorale preludes of Bach, the organ trio became fully developed into a concerto-like fast movement: they are written in ritornello form, with the theme in the bass as well as the upper parts, which are written imitatively with virtuosic episodes. The first version of the slow movement of BWV 528 also dates from roughly the same period: instead of the larger scale structure of the two chorale preludes, the musical material is broken up into imitative two bar phrases, often of bewitching beauty. Although no longer having any liturgical references (in particular no cantus firmus), the sonatas BWV 525–530 preserve the concerto-like quality of the two Weimar chorale preludes; like them the manual and pedal parts are written within an idiom particular to the organ rather than that of solo instruments like the violin or flute. On the other hand, there is very little similarity between the compositional style of the organ sonatas and that of Bach's organ transcriptions of instrumental concertos by Vivaldi and other composers.

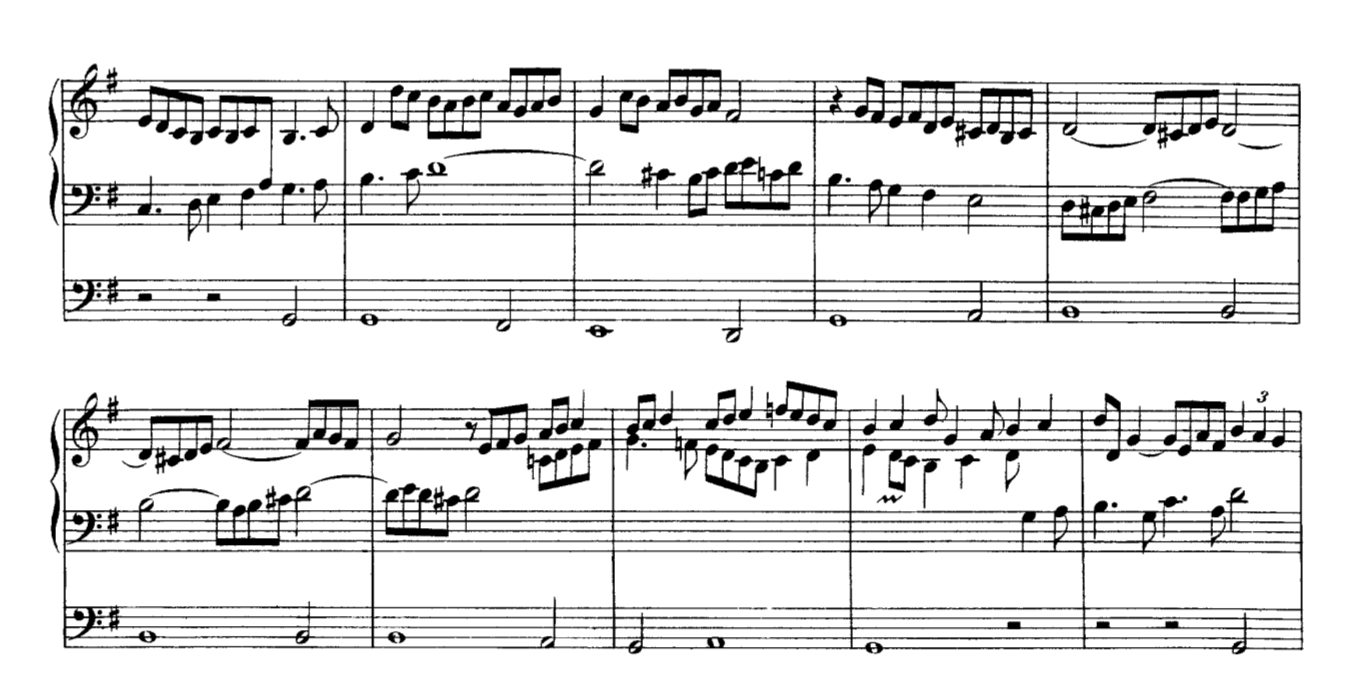
Start of Versus III of Nun lob, mein Seel, BuxWV 213, Dieterich Buxtehude

With their chamber music quality, the organ sonatas have clear affinities with Bach's sonatas for obbligato harpsichord and solo instrument—violin, viola da gamba and flute, also composed or compiled in Leipzig. They are all written in trio sonata form with binary and ritornello movements. Moreover, the collection of six sonatas for obbligato harpsichord and violin, BWV 1014–1019 seems to have involved a similar survey, recording all possible ways of writing for the instrumental combination. There are, however, significant differences:

- the organ sonatas are conceived more in concerto form with three movements, whereas the instrumental sonatas have four or more movements like a sonata da chiesa;
- the instrumental sonatas do not preserve a strict equality between the upper part—there is often a distinction between material for the melody instrument and the keyboard part, which can play a purely continuo-like role;
- in the instrumental sonatas, either part can be divided, with the addition of an extra voice or double stopping;
- while movements from the instrumental sonatas can be diffuse and expansive—possibly because more musical textures are available—movements in the organ sonatas are in general less concerned with texture, clearer in form, and more concise and succinct, sometimes to the extent of seeming like miniatures.

Probably the closest similarities between the instrumental sonatas and the organ sonatas occur in their fugal final movements in every aspect—texture, melody and structure. The distinction between sonata types was subsequently delineated by Scheibe, who introduced the term Sonate auf Concertenart to contrast with the sonata da chiesa (see below), but there are as many exceptions to the rule as adherences. Commentators agree that the collection of organ sonatas marks one of the later stages in Bach's development of the trio form.

One of the main composers to develop the purely instrumental trio sonata was Bach's contemporary Georg Philipp Telemann, godfather to Carl Philipp Emanuel Bach and his predecessor as Kapellmeister in Hamburg. One of the only features that Telemann adopted from the older French tradition of the trio sonata was the adaptability of the instrumentation. Telemann's Six Concerts et Six Suites (1715–1720) could be played on two or three instruments (with an optional viola da gamba or cello). Some movements in the Concerts occasionally show similarities in texture and form with Bach's organ sonatas: Williams (1980) gives the following example from the second half of the second movement of Concert IV for flute and harpsichord in E minor, TWV 42:e3.

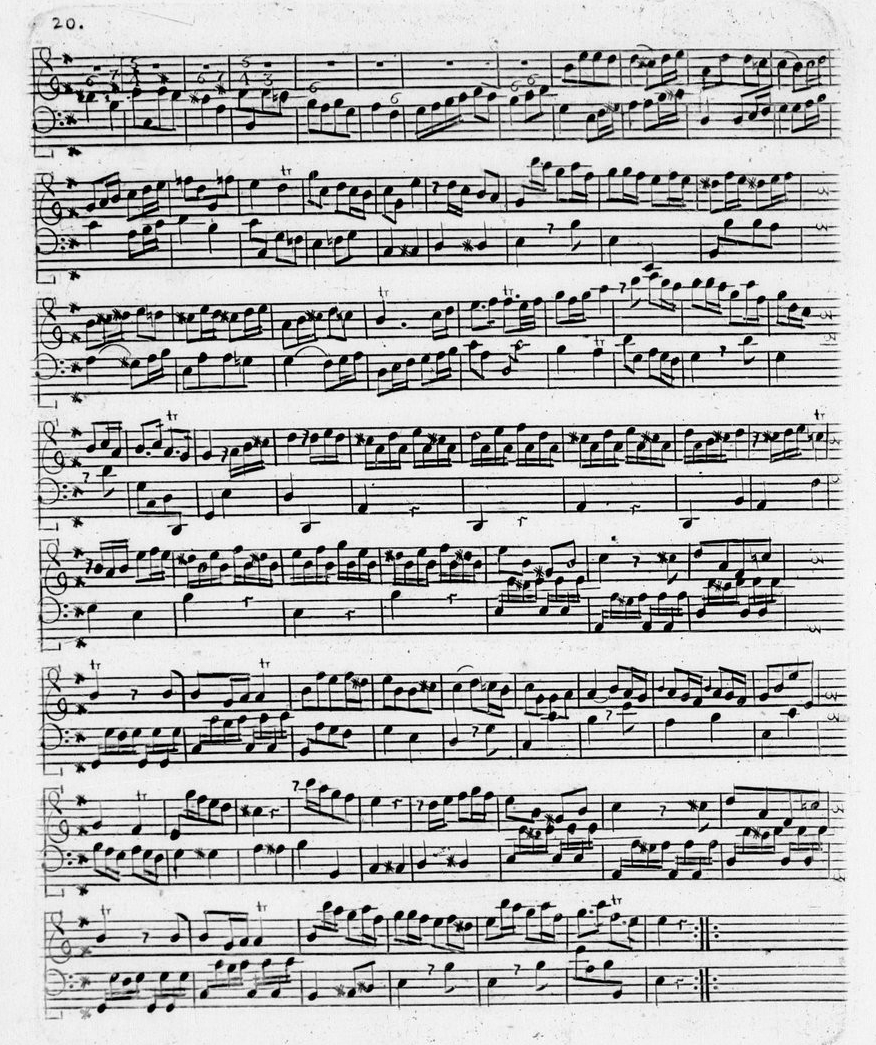
Harpsichord part of second half of second movement of Telemann's Concert IV engraved in Hamburg in 1734 by Telemann himself

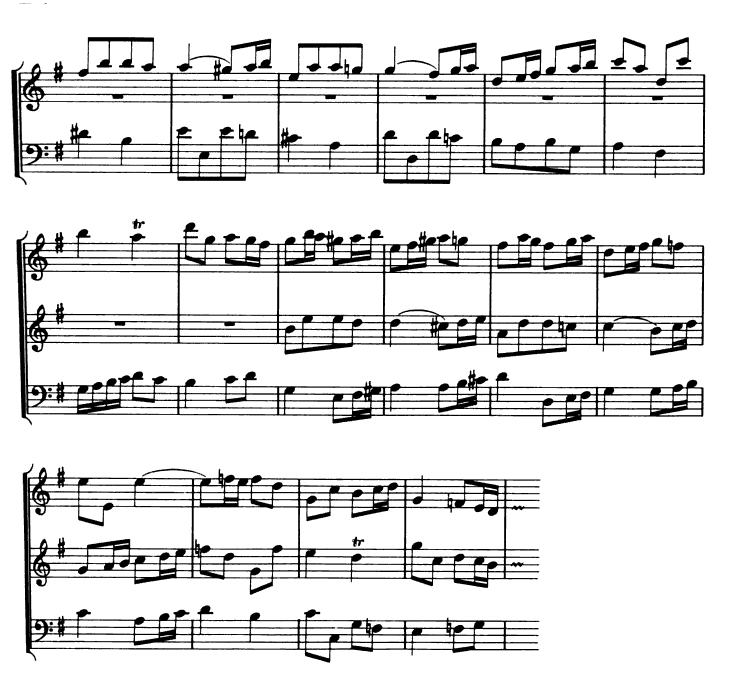

Some of the other movements of the Concerts have been cited by Swack (1993) and Zohn (2015) as examples of the Sonate auf Concertenart. Later organ sonatas by Bach's student Johann Ludwig Krebs show a clear influence of Bach and closely imitate his style; conversely the newer galant style of writing, popular among Krebs' generation, can be discerned in some movements of BWV 525–530, for example the slow movement of the fourth sonata. Several organ trios written by Bach's students survive and are discussed in detail in Stauffer (2016) and by Dirksen in Bach (2010).

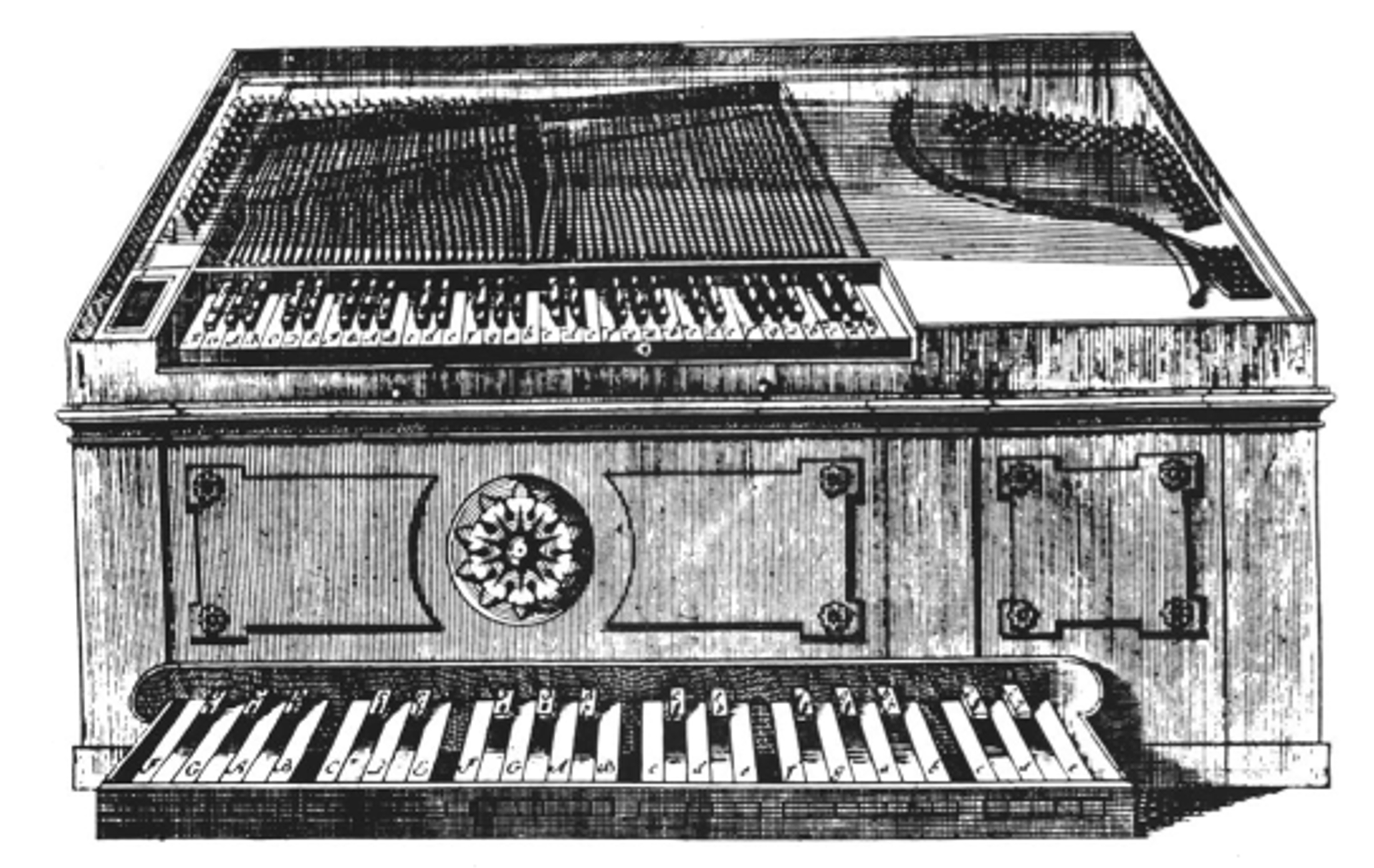
J. Verscheure Reynvaan: engraving of an eighteenth-century pedal clavichord

=== Performance practice ===
Williams (2003) and Speerstra (2004) have noted that the compass of the keyboard parts of Bach's BWV 525–530 rarely go below the tenor C, so they could have been played on a single manual pedal clavichord, by moving the left hand down an octave, a customary practice in the 18th century.

=== Sonaten auf Concertenart ===
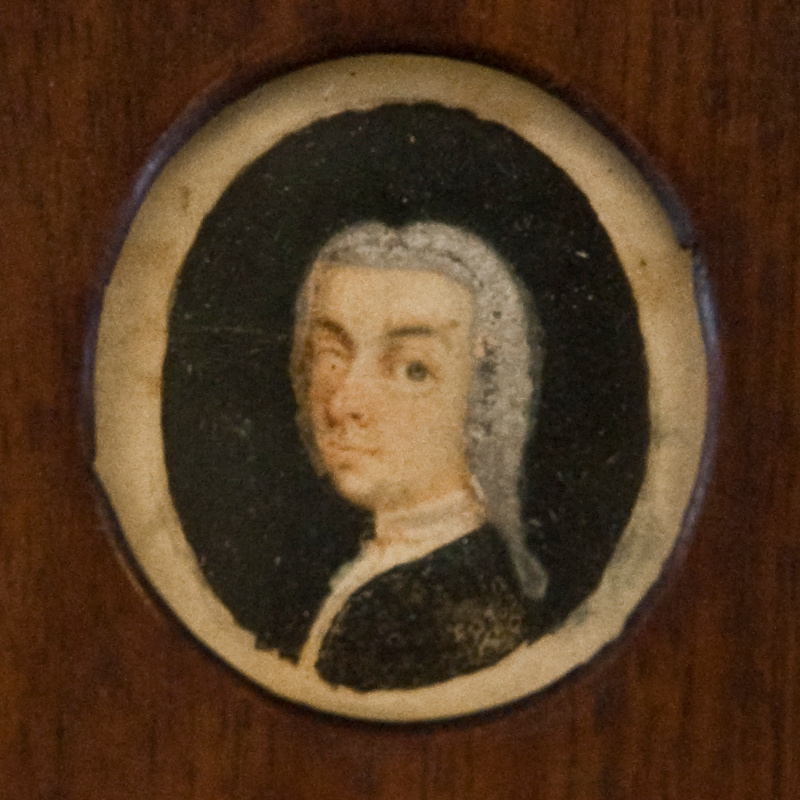
Johann Adolf Scheibe

The music theoretician and organist Johann Adolph Scheibe, a former pupil of Bach, was one of the first people in Germany to describe musical genres, such as the sonata, concerto and sinfonia. He had mixed views on Bach's compositions. He was extremely critical of some of Bach's organ works because of their complexity, comparing Bach's "artful" counterpoint unfavourably with the "natural" melodies of the organist-composer Johann Mattheson, another musical commentator who since 1730 had become a staunch critic of Bach. In 1737, Scheibe wrote that Bach "deprived his pieces of all that was natural by giving them a bombastic and confused character, and eclipsed their beauty by too much art."

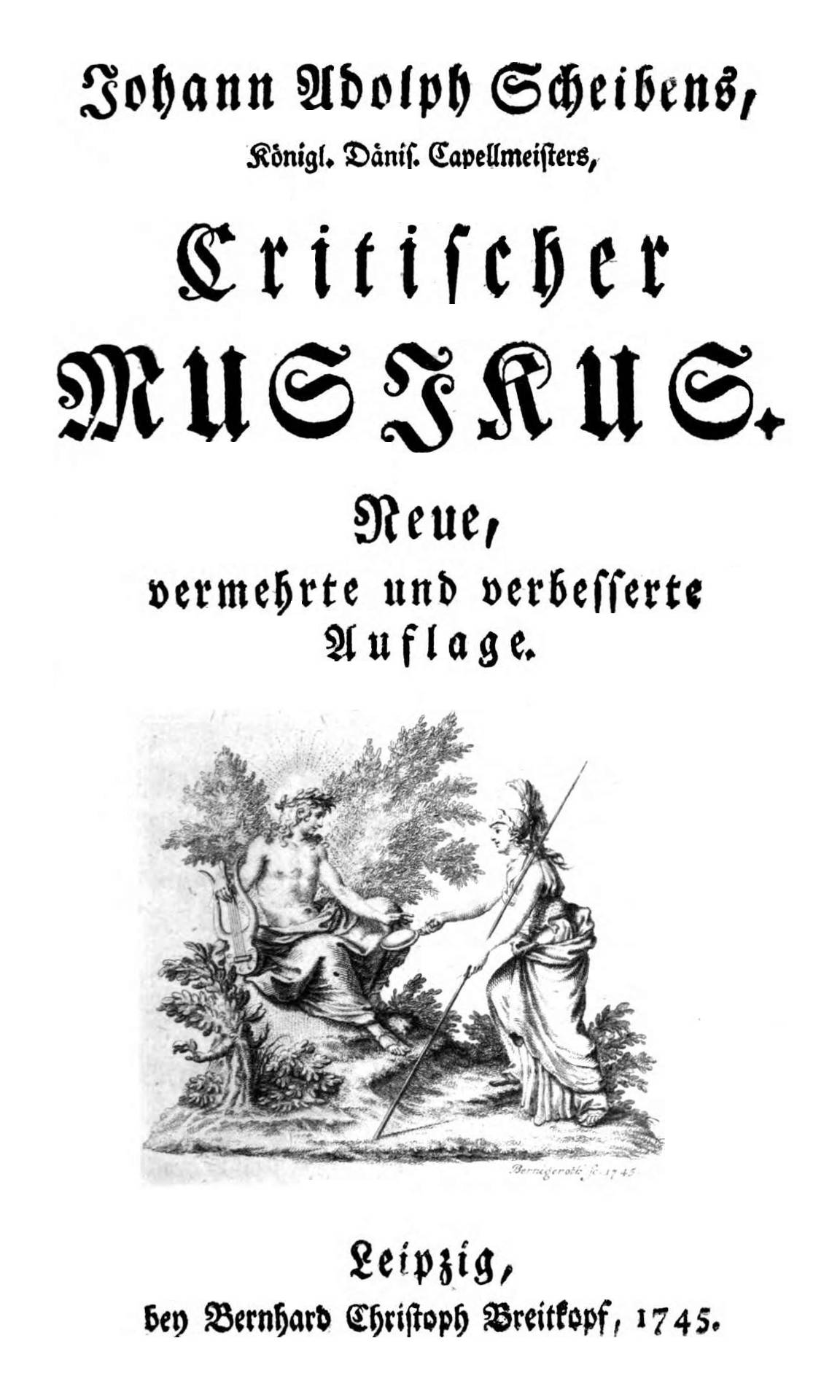
Title page of the revised edition of Scheibe's Critischer Musikus

About the trio sonatas, however, Scheibe had only praise as he considered that they fitted into his theory of the Sonaten auf Concertenart—"sonatas in concerto style". In his treatise Critischer Musikus (1740-1745), Scheibe gave the following description of this musical genre, distinguishing between the a proper or genuine sonata and one auf Concertenart: (Note: Zohn 2015, pp. 286, 566 This is Zohn's translation of the following passage from Scheibe's Critischer Musikus, (1740), a revised and expanded version of what he originally wrote in Der critische Musikus: "Ich will aber zuvörderst von den dreystimmigen und vierstimmigen Sonaten reden, davon die ersten insgemein Trios, die letztern aber Quadros genennet werden, hernach aber auch die übrigen etwas erläutern. Beyde Arten von Sonaten, von welchen ich zuerst reden will, werden eigentlich auf zweyerley Art eingerichtet, nämlich als eigentliche Sonaten, und dann auch auf Concertenart ... "Das eigentliche Wesen dieser Stücke aber ist überhaupt dieses, daß in allen Stimmen, vornehmlich aber in den Oberstimmen ein ordentlicher Gesang, und eine fugenmäßige Ausarbeitung seyn muß. Wenn sie nicht auf Concertenart eingerichtet werden: so darf man wenig kräuselnde und verändernde Sätze anbringen, sondern es muß durchaus eine bündige, fließende und natürliche Melodie vorhanden seyn ... "Die Ordnung aber, die man in diesen Sonaten insgemein zu halten pfleget, ist fol- gende. Zuerst erscheint ein langsamer Satz, hierauf ein geschwinder oder lebhafter Satz; diesem folget ein langsamer, und zuletzt beschließt ein geschwinder und munterer Satz. Wiewohl man kann dann und wann den ersten langsamen Satz weglassen, und so fort mit dem lebhaften Satze anfangen. Dieses letztere pflegt man insonderheit zu thun, wenn man die Sonaten auf Concertenart ausarbeitet ... "Der nunmehro folgende geschwinde oder lebhafte Satz wird insgemein auf Fugenart ausgearbeitet, wo er nicht selbst eine ordentliche Fuge ist ... Wenn das Trio concerten- mässig seyn soll: so kann auch ein[e] Stimme stärker, als die andere, arbeiten, und also mancherley kräuselnde, laufende und verändernde Sätze hören lassen. Die Unterstimme kann auch in diesem Falle nicht so bündig, als in einer andern ordentlichen Sonate, gesetzet werden.")

I will first discuss three- and four-part sonatas, of which the former are usually called "trios," the latter "quartets"; then I will comment upon the others. Both types of sonatas that I will discuss first are properly arranged in one of two ways, namely as proper sonatas or as sonatas in concerto style...

The proper essence of [trios] is above all the presence of a regular melody in all parts, especially the upper voices, and a fugal working out. If they are not arranged in concerto style, one may introduce few convoluted and varied passages; rather, there must be a concise, flowing, and natural melody throughout...

The ordering that one usually observes in these sonatas is the following. First a slow movement appears, then a fast or lively one; this is followed by a slow movement, and finally a fast and cheerful movement concludes. But now and then one may omit the first, slow movement, and begin immediately with the lively one. One does this particularly if composing sonatas in concerto style...

The fast or lively movement that follows [the first, slow movement] is usually worked out in fugal style, if it is not in fact a regular fugue. Should the trio be concerto-like, one [upper] part can be worked out more fully than the other, and thus a number of convoluted, running, and varied passages may be heard. In this case the lowest part can be composed less concisely than in another, regular sonata.

As Breig (1999) comments, Scheibe regarded Bach's organ sonatas as his main contribution to the genre of Sonaten auf Concertenart. They conform to Scheibe's description in two ways: the role and style of the bass part; and the three-movement format. Firstly the limitations on pedalboard technique dictated that the bass line in the pedal had to be simpler than the two upper parts in the manuals. Even so, Scheibe's analysis only applies in its strict form to half the movements: the starting fast movements of all but the first sonata; the slow movements of all but the first and fourth sonatas; and the whole of the third sonata BWV 527. In all the other movements—in particular in the entire first sonata BWV 525 and in all the final fast movements—the theme passes to the pedal, usually in simplified form stripped of ornaments; thus even in these movements the bass line is less elaborate than the upper parts.

Secondly the limitation to three movements, omitting a first slow movement, was perhaps a conscious decision of Bach. In the earlier collection of sonatas for violin and obbligato harpsichord (BWV 1014–1019), mostly composed in four movements, the opening slow movements have long cantilena melodies for the solo violin. This style of writing would not have translated well to the organ: indeed Bach reserved such lines for the elaborate cantus firmus parts in his ornamental chorale preludes. In the sonatas for violin and harpsichord, Bach does not adhere to strict trio sonata form in the slow movements, where the upper part in the obbligato harpsichord part can be divided into two voices; and where the violin can fill out the harmonies with double stopping. In the organ sonatas the harmonies are provided by the pedal and the two manual parts, which play single melodic lines throughout.

== Works ==
=== Sonata No. 1 in E♭ major, BWV 525 ===
Sonata No. 1 in E♭ major, BWV 525
I. Allegro

II. Adagio

III. Allegro
All performed by Johannes-Ernst Köhler, Silbermann organ, Fraureuth

1. [Allegro] (E♭ major, 2/2)
2. Adagio (C minor, 12/8)
3. Allegro (E♭ major, 3/4)

=== Sonata No. 2 in C minor, BWV 526 ===
Sonata No. 2 in C minor, BWV 526
I. Vivace (3:38)

II. Lento (3:09)

III. Allegro
Hans Otto, Silbermann Organ, Fraureuth

1. Vivace (C minor, 2/2)
2. Largo (E♭ major, 3/4)
3. Allegro (C minor, 2/2)

=== Sonata No. 3 in D minor, BWV 527 ===
Sonata No. 3 in D minor, BWV 527
I. Andante

II. Adagio e dolce

III. Vivace
Hans Otto, Silbermann Organ, Großhartmannsdorf

1. Andante (D minor, 2/4)
2. Adagio e dolce (F major, 6/8)
3. Vivace (D minor, 3/8)

=== Sonata No. 4 in E minor, BWV 528 ===
Sonata No. 4 in E minor, BWV 528
I. Adagio – Vivace

II. Andante

III. Un poco Allegro
Christoph Albrecht, Silbermann Organ, Crostau

1. Adagio – Vivace (E minor, 4/4 – 3/4)
2. Andante (B minor, 4/4)
3. Un poco Allegro (E minor, 3/8)

The first movement is a transcription of the eighth movement of Die Himmel erzählen die Ehre Gottes, BWV 76, which is scored there for oboe d'amore and viola da gamba.

=== Sonata No. 5 in C major, BWV 529 ===
Sonata No. 5 in C major, BWV 529
I. Allegro

II. Largo

III. Allegro
Hans Otto, Silbermann Organ, Großhartmannsdorf

1. Allegro (C major, 3/4)
2. Largo (A minor, 6/8)
3. Allegro (C major, 2/4)

==== I. Allegro ====
This brightly scored and skillfully composed movement has a da capo ABA form. In structure and texture, it resembles a trio sonata in the galant style for two flutes and continuo. The range of the keyboard parts, however, is beyond that of such instruments; and the succinct and idiomatic keyboard writing with intricate development sections is typical of the organ sonatas. The A section is 50 bars long. After the 54 bar development section B, it is reprised in its entirety.

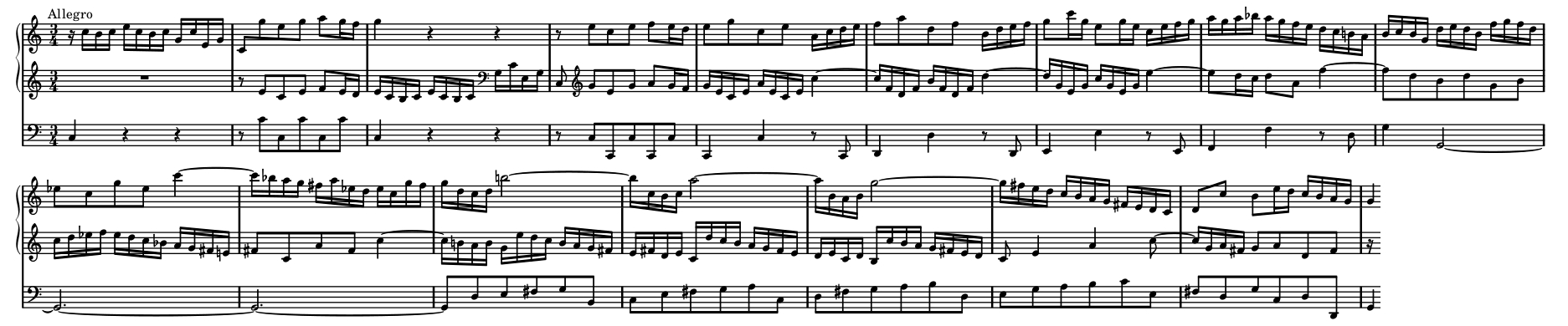

The opening two bars of the A section comprise a solo semiquaver flourish in one of the manuals followed by a tutti response in quavers. It recurs throughout the movement, marking the beginning of new episodes. In the first 16-bar segment, it alternates with semiquaver scale passages played imitatively between the two manuals. That material is then repeated in the dominant key with the upper parts exchanged. There is a short "development" episode of 14 bars where for 7 bars the material of the opening segment is permuted between the parts—at one stage over a long pedal point—and then repeated with the manual parts inverted. A brief 5-bar coda reprising the imitative semiquaver scales leads into section B.

In conformity with the whole movement, the main development section B has a symmetrical da capo aba structure, made up of 21 bars, 12 bars, and 21 bars. A fugue subject in semiquavers is introduced at the beginning of section B: although similar in shape to the flourish opening of the main theme, it involves scale figures in contrast to arpeggios. The fugue subject is freely developed in exchanges between the upper parts before fragments of the main theme of increasing length begin to be heard, starting with the opening flourish. In the central b episode, two 4 bar reprises of the main theme encase 4 bars where elements of both themes are heard simultaneously, alternating between the manuals. There are significant modulations in section B particularly in the interjections of the main theme: the first section a is in the key of C major; section b is in C major with interjections in F major and A minor; and then an inversion of the material of section a returns in A minor with interjections of the main theme in G major, F major, D minor, and C major, in anticipation of the reprise of section A.

Throughout the movement the pedal part plays the role of a continuo, in a particularly simple form in section B. In the A sections the pedal part includes a walking bass in quavers as well as pedal points; many of the pedal motifs are derived from figures in the keyboard parts.

==== II. Largo ====
Manuscript copies, made by Vogler, Walther and Kellner, show that the second movement was often performed as an intermediate movement between the Prelude and Fugue in C major for organ, BWV 545. It is thought to have been originally composed in Weimar and reworked for the collection of organ sonatas.

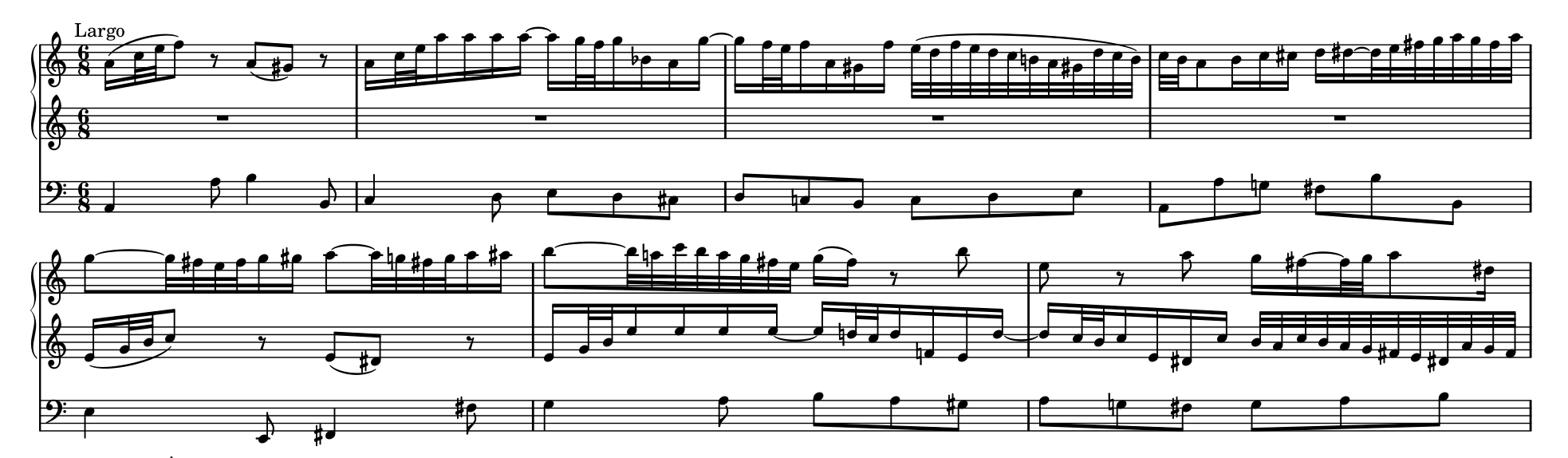

Sackmann (2000) notes that this movement—like many other instrumental slow movements by Bach such as the sinfonia from the Weimar cantata Ich hatte viel Bekümmernis, BWV 21—shows the influence of the so-called "Corelli style," an Italian sonata style refined and perfected by Arcangelo Corelli. The style is exemplified in the "embellished" slow movements of Corelli's violin sonatas Op. 5, in which the range of musical motifs is widely varied, both through rhythm and "diastema" [the intervals between consecutive notes in the melody]. As Crocker (1986) explains, this style is distinguished by its lyricism: Corelli elevated the sonata da chiesa to a new level of eloquence "with a lyricism found only before in vocal music"; the style was "smoother and clearer" than that of earlier composers, "giving a feeling of spaciousness and breadth that happily reinforced the greater length".

Williams (1985) gives a broad musical description of the Largo as a movement with two voices in dialogue over a continuo bass combining aspects of three different musical forms: fugue, ritornello and da capo aria. Together these create a mood or affekt tinged with melancholy. In the opening bars the first fugal subject and countersubject are heard in the manuals over the continuo bass. The elegiac passage with the lyrical subject and countersubject in counterpoint is heard several times, scarcely altered, during the movement. It is instantly recognizable each time it returns and plays the role of a ritornello. The second subject starts at bar 13 and illustrates the other groups of musical figures that Bach employs in the movement.

==== III. Allegro ====
The detailed structure of the movement is as follows:

- A, bars 1–12. Fugal three-bar subject in A minor in the upper manual with a continuo accompaniment in crotchets and quavers in the pedal. A bar before the entry of the subject in the lower manual a fourth below, the chromatic countersubject starts in the upper manual. In the last five bars (mm. 8–12), there is counterpoint between the keyboards derived from figures in the chromatic countersubject, partly in sequence and partly in imitative responses.
- B, bars 13–20. Section with second subject in C major. In the first bar, there are sequences of demisemiquavers in the upper part and semiquavers in the lower part, inverted and exchanged between the parts in the next bar. After a two-bar interlude with contrary motion between the parts and further demisemiquaver figures, the imitative phrases in the episode from section A are heard again, before a reprise in reverse order of the two opening bars of demisemiquaver/semiquaver figures.
- A, bars 21–32. Return of the first fugal subject in C major in the first eight bars, swapped between the manual parts, with the lower manual falling silent in the eighth bar; chromaticism is not used during the counterpoint. This is followed by a reprise of bars 15–18 with the upper voices swapped.
- B, bars 33–40. Second subject (bars 13–14) slightly altered in dominant key of D minor; then reprises of bars 9–12 in D minor followed by a reprise of bars 15–16 modulating back to the home key of A minor.
- A, bars 41–54. Repeat of opening section A, but now with the accompanying countersubject in the lower manual from the start. Coda in the last two bars with a cadence in the phrygian mode.

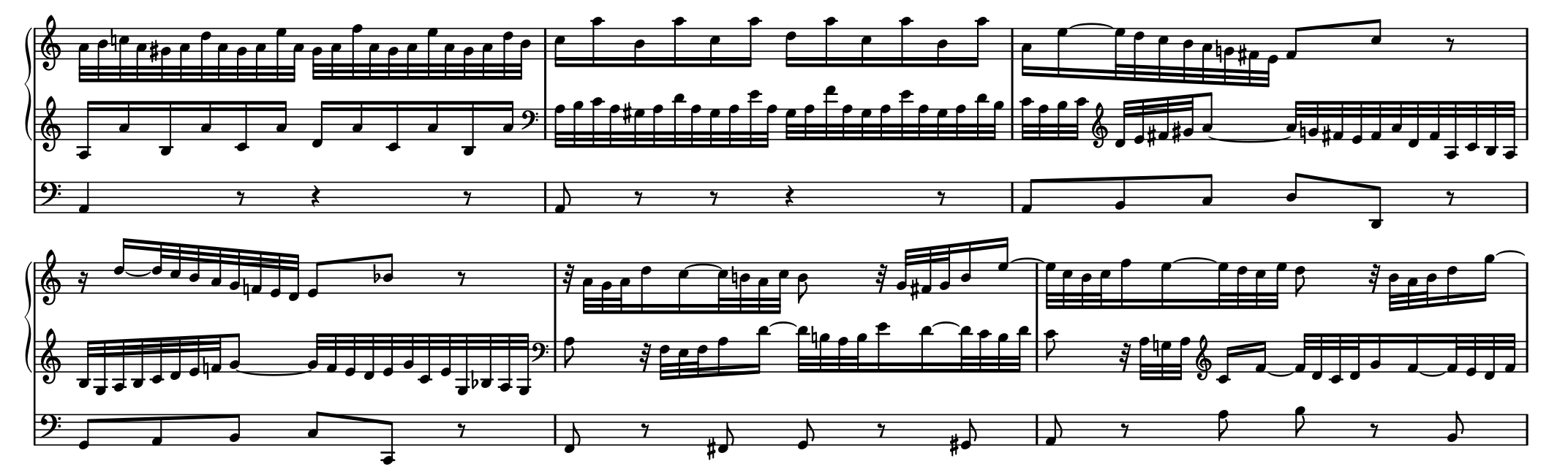

The da capo aspects of the movement are manifested in the first and last sections in A minor, which frame the middle section, comprising bars 13–40, that starts with new musical material in the relative major key of C major. In the movement the seven bar fugal melody segment (bars 1–7, 21–27, 41–47) that forms the ritornello is never divided up, in contrast to the intervening bars which are developed from demisemiquaver figures spun out into long phrases which are freely permuted. The long demisemiquaver phrases are themselves developed from distinct "motif-cells" of four demisemiquavers—these can be seen in the last quaver of bar 4, the first quaver of bar 13 and the last quaver of bar 16. None of these occur in the ritornello segment and are examples of what Walther termed "varied figures" in his 1708 theoretical treatise Praecepta der musicalischen Composition. (Examples of freely developed material occur already in bar 8 (and later in bar 48), which serves as a linking passage: the diminished fifths there are similar to those Bach used later in the opening Fantasia of the third keyboard partita in A minor, BWV 827.) Thus the lyrical thematic material of the ritornello melody is kept distinct from that of the freely developed demisemiquaver episodes it frames. In this way Bach pushed his system of "composing through motifs" even further than he did in the chorale preludes of the Orgelbüchlein.

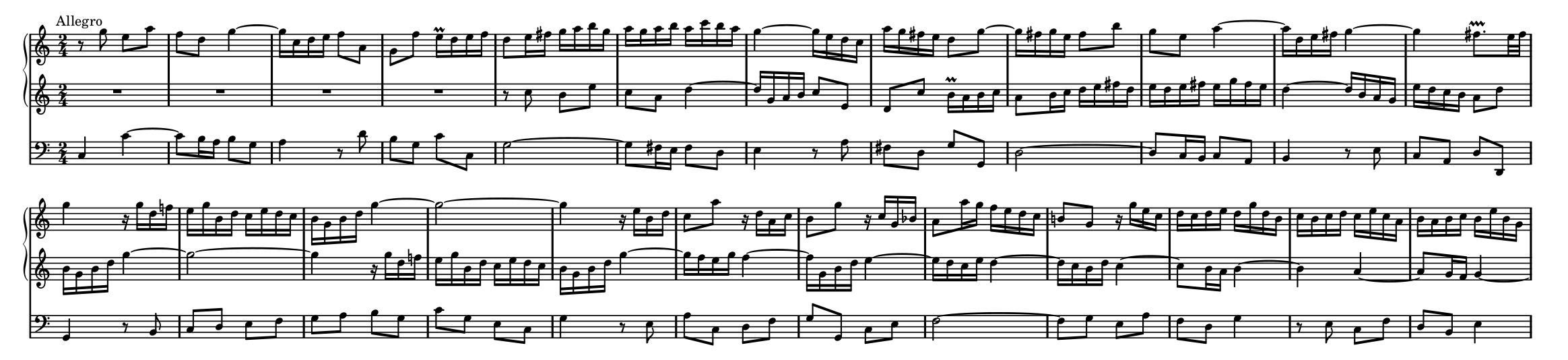

The fugal last movement of BWV 529—in contrast to the more forward-looking first movement—follows established patterns. The opening theme—the first subject—is similar to that of the earlier Allegro in the Violin Sonata No. 3 of Corelli's Op. 5 and that of the later four-part fugue in A♭ major in Book II of The Well-Tempered Clavier. In BWV 529, the pedal also participates as a third voice in the fugue: the quaver chief motif of the first fugue subject (the first six notes) fits well with the pedal; and later on in the second subject the semiquavers in the manuals are also taken up in the pedal part.

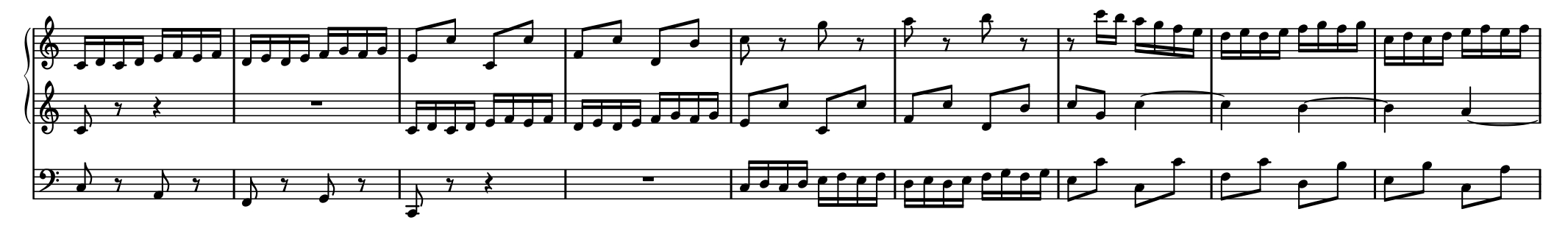

Williams (2003) discusses the "ingenious" structure of the movement which he describes as "bright, extrovert, tuneful, restless, intricate": there is "inventive" semiquaver passagework in the manuals matched by "instructive" or challenging footwork in the pedal. The structure can be seen on two levels. On the one hand there is the broad binary structure of a dance-form: the first part comprising bars 1–73 with the first and second subject followed by a short coda in the dominant key of G major; then the second part, bars 73–163, in which the reprise of the first subject has the form of a development section, followed by the second subject and the coda in the tonic key of C major.

On the other hand, there is a more detailed division into sections:

- A, first subject, bars 1–29. The fugal subject is heard in the manuals followed by a semiquaver countersubject; the pedal plays a continuo role with its own fragmented motifs. An episode begins at bar 13 with semiquaver passagework alternating between the manuals over a walking bass. At bar 21 the counterpoint in the upper voices continues over three statements (bars 21, 23 and 25) of the chief motif of the fugue subject before the concluding cadence.
- B, second subject, bars 29–59. The second subject is heard in the tonic key in the upper keyboard, answered by the lower keyboard and then the pedal an octave lower. At bar 39, it is heard in the lower manual in A minor, answered in the upper manual with the lower manual in parallel thirds. The first subject is then heard again with its countersubject in A minor, starting in the lower manual. At bar 51 section B concludes with an eight-bar coda similar to the close of section A: the upper voices alternate in playing the semiquaver chief motif of the second subject over four statements of the chief motif of the first subject in the pedal.
- A, coda, bars 59–73. In the dominant key of G major, there is a stretto version of the first subject leading to a reprise of the episode starting at bar 13.
- A, first subject, bars 73–119. An extended and complex development section, which modulates through various minor keys and is divided into four parts; it is described in detail below.
- B, second subject, bars 119–149. As in the first section B but now with the upper parts interchanged and in the subdominant key of F major.
- A, coda, bars 149–163. As in the first coda, but again with the upper parts switched and an adjustment for the closing cadence.

The development section (bars 73–119) is formed of four parts. In the first tersely scored part, bars 73–89, the first subject is heard modulating through different minor keys with an almost constant stream of semiquavers running through the three parts.

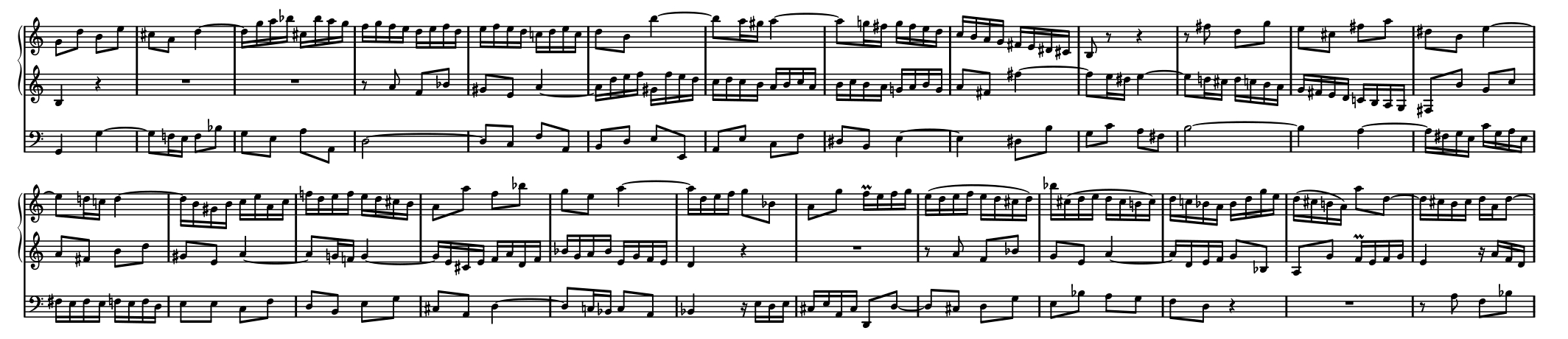

Although the chief motif in the fugue subject is unaltered, the semiquaver countersubject is freely modified. The fugue subject is heard first in the upper keyboard, then in the lower keyboard, and finally in the pedal in bar 79. Without a break in bar 81 the pedal repeats the chief motif off the beat, followed by entries in the upper manual and then lower manual. The latter is accompanied by an angular version of the semiquaver countersubject in the pedal which leads on to a further statement of the head motif. In bars 89–97 the first fugue subject and modified countersubject are heard in the two upper voices in the key of D minor. In bars 97–111, there is another episode with the pedal playing three statements of the chief motif below semiquavers in the upper parts which culminate in six bars of imitative broken chords:

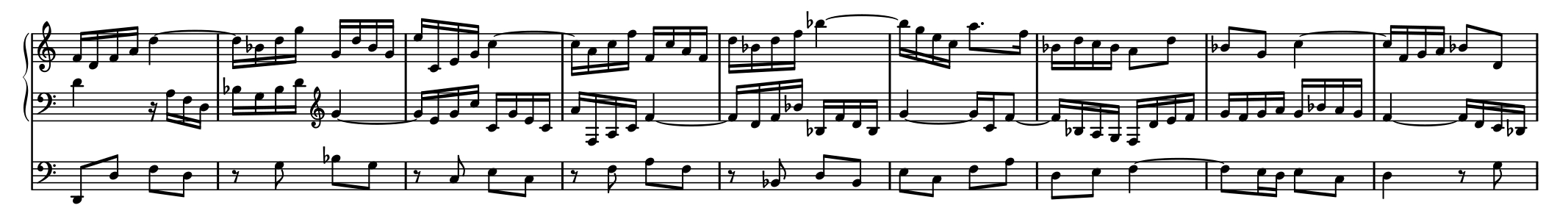

These lead seamlessly into the fourth part, bars 111–119, a 7 bar reprise of the first fugue subject (starting in the last three bars above) in the subdominant key of F major, which concludes the development section.

As Williams (2003) comments, the movement's "lively continuity is aided throughout by the tied notes and suspensions typical of the first subject [...] in all three parts."

=== Sonata No. 6 in G major, BWV 530 ===
Sonata No. 6 in G major, BWV 530
I. Vivace

II. Lento

III. Allegro
Erich Piasetzki, Silbermann Organ, Nassau, Saxony

1. Vivace (G major, 2/4)
2. Lento (E minor, 6/8)
3. Allegro (G major, 2/2)

== Reception and legacy ==
=== German-speaking countries ===
Ich gehe alle Sonntage um 12 uhr zum Baron von Suiten—und da wird nichts gespiellt als Händl und Bach.— ich mach mir eben eine Collection von den Bachischen fugen.— so wohl sebastian als Emanuel und friedemann.— Dann auch von den händlishcen ... Sie werden auch wissen daß der Engländer Bach gestorben ist?— schade der Musikalischer Welt!	At noon every Sunday I go to the Baron van Swieten's where nothing but Handel and Bach is played. I am making a collection of Bach fugues, not only of Sebastian but also of Emanuel and Friedemann. Then also those of Handel ... Have you also heard that the English Bach has died? What a shame for the musical world!
Wolfgang Amadeus Mozart, Vienna, 10 April 1782, letter to his father in Salzburg

In the eighteenth century in Germany, the organ sonatas were transmitted through hand copies made by Bach's pupils and circle, although no copies of the complete collection survive from students such as Johann Peter Kellner, Johann Friedrich Agricola, and Johann Christian Kittel. A copy made by Kittel of part of the autograph manuscript survives; and Johann Ludwig Krebs and Johann Gottfried Walther made copies of individual movements that might predate the manuscript. In 1764 handwritten copies of three movements of the sonatas were also available from the Leipzig publisher Bernhard Christoph Breitkopf, who also produced librettos of Bach's cantatas during his lifetime.

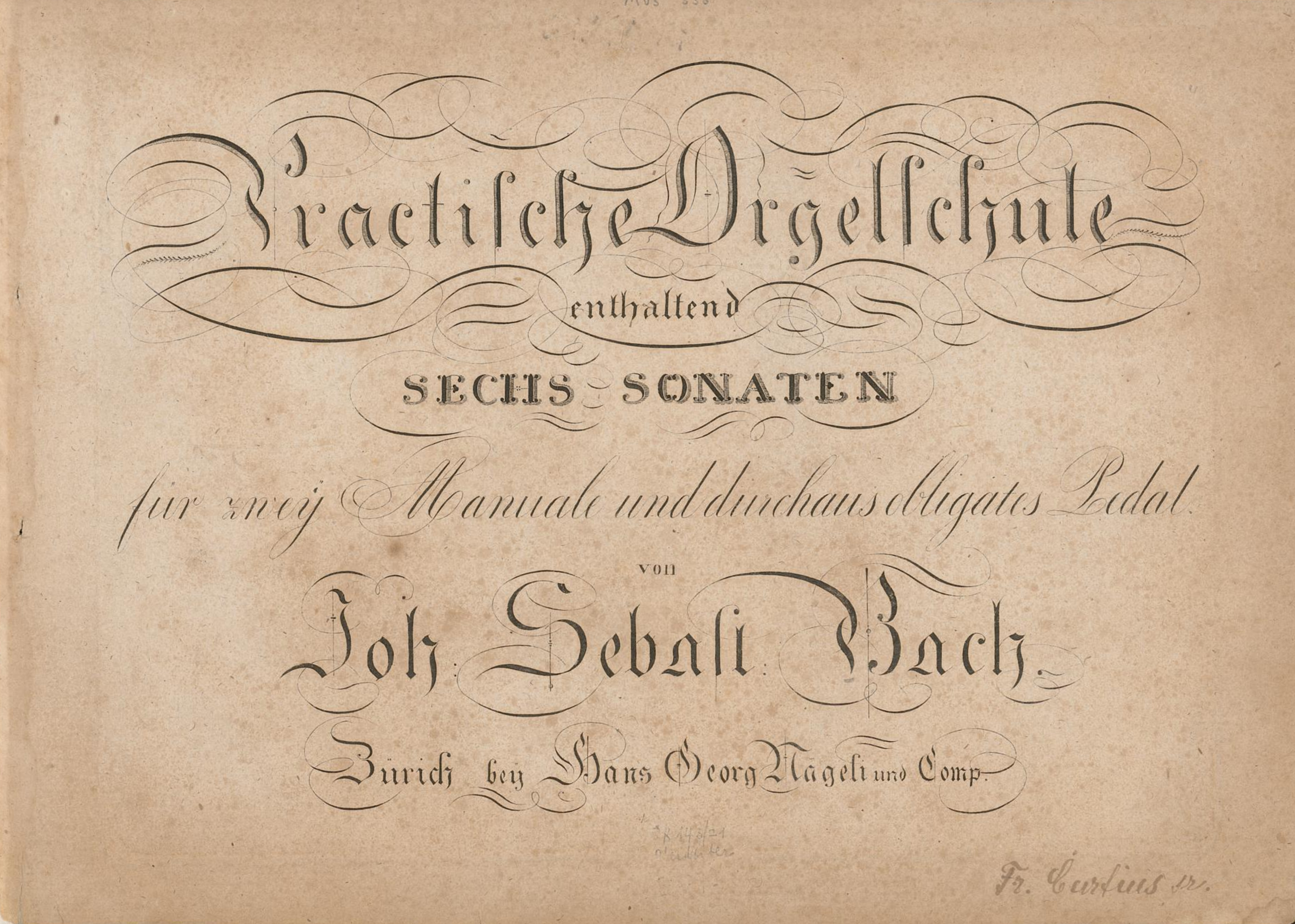
Title page of edition of Hans Georg Nägeli, published in Zürich around 1815

Later in the eighteenth century publishers could supply hand copies of the entire collection: in 1799 the Viennese publisher Johann Traeg advertised the collection on their lists. After Bach's death the organ sonatas entered the standard repertoire of German organists, although more as a benchmark for the mastery of technique than for public performance. The organ sonatas were also disseminated amongst musical amateurs in more accessible arrangements as chamber works or Hausmusik for private performance in the home: an arrangement for two harpsichords, with each player taking an upper part and the bass line, was probably first copied by Wilhelm Friedemann Bach or Carl Philipp Emanuel Bach and might have originated from domestic music-making in the Bach household.

The first printed score for organ only appeared in the early nineteenth century and was also derived from the autograph manuscript. It was published around 1815 in Zürich by the Swiss musicologist Hans Georg Nägeli. The son of a musically inclined Protestant pastor in Wetzikon, Nägeli showed precocious musical skills. In 1790 he moved to Zurich where he took lessons with the Swiss pianist Johann David Brünings, who introduced him to the music of Bach. A year later he set up a music shop and in 1794 a publishing house. Corresponding with Breitkopf and the widow of C.P.E. Bach, he was able to acquire Bach manuscripts, including that of the Mass in B minor, which he eventually published. His Bach publications started with The Well-Tempered Clavier in 1801 and The Art of Fugue in 1802. His interests later turned to pedagogy and singing: in Zurich he set up an institute similar to the Sing-Akademie zu Berlin of Carl Friedrich Christian Fasch.

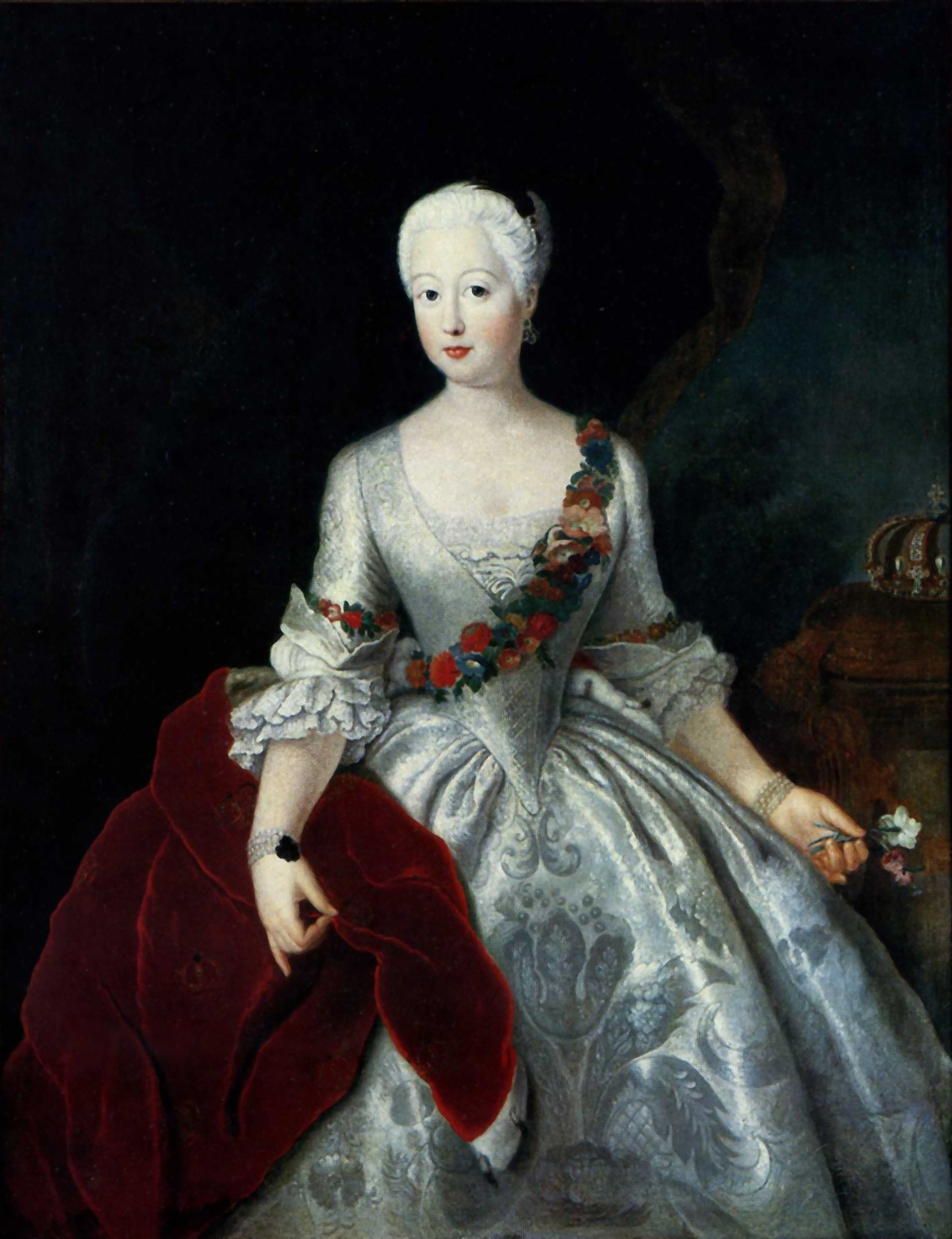
Princess Anna Amalie

There are also later copies of the autograph manuscript in Vienna, made by Johann Christoph Oley in the 1760s, and in Berlin, in the library of Princess Anna Amalia, which contained an exceptional number of Bach manuscripts. Bach's former pupil Johann Kirnberger was music teacher to Anna Amalia: like her flute-playing brother Frederick the Great, who employed Carl Philipp Emanuel Bach as court harpsichordist, she was a keen amateur musician, composing and playing the organ.

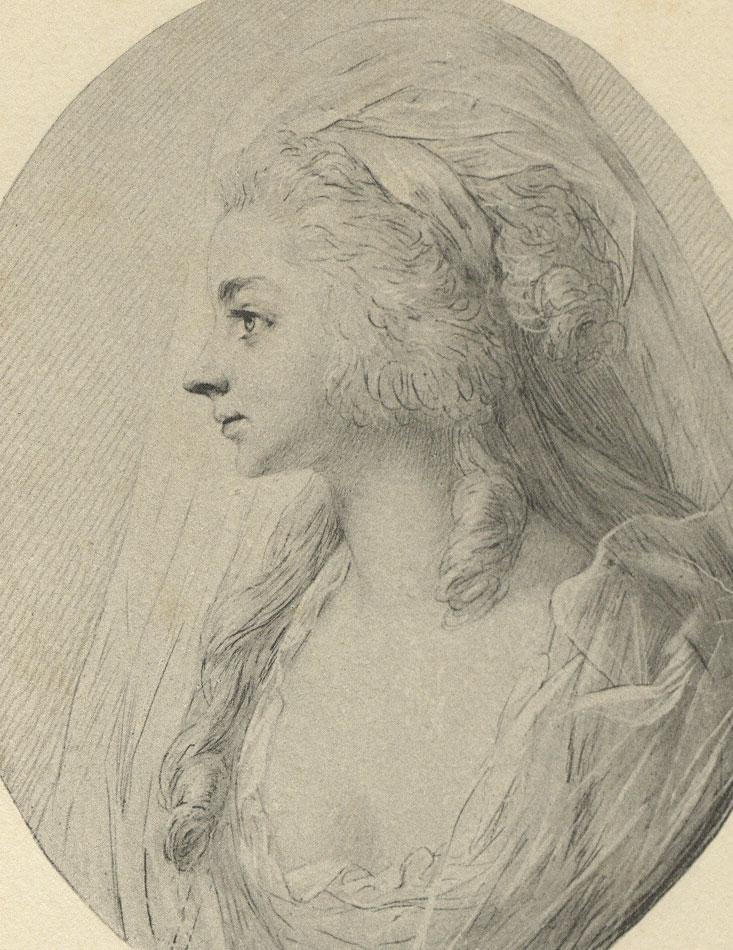
Portrait of Sara Levy by Anton Graff, 1786

The royal court was not the only place in Berlin where Bach was performed. The family of Daniel Itzig, banker to Frederick the Great and his father, also provided a cultural milieu for musical connoisseurs: four of his daughters, Sara, Zippora, Fanny and Bella (maternal grandmother of Felix Mendelssohn), were all keyboard players. Sara was the most gifted harpsichordist, of professional standard. When Wilhelm Friedemann Bach moved to Berlin from Dresden, she took lessons from him and provided him with some financial support in his old age. After her marriage to the banker Samuel Salomon Levy in 1784, she ran a weekly musical salon in their residence on the Museuminsel: the concert room housed both a harpsichord and a fortepiano and was large enough to accommodate a chamber orchestra. With the help of Wilhelm Friedemann and Carl Philipp Emanuel, Sara also built up a significant library of hand copies of Bach manuscripts. Her collection included Bach's organ sonatas, which eventually were passed on to her grandnephew Felix Mendelssohn; there was also a copy of the two harpsichord arrangement of the organ sonatas in the Itzig household, belonging to Sara's sister Fanny. Sara also commissioned works, including C. P. Bach's final composition, the Double concerto for harpsichord and fortepiano (1788). Her salon attracted the Berlin intelligentsia, including Alexander von Humboldt, Wilhelm von Humboldt, Friedrich Schleiermacher and Johann Gottlieb Fichte. Sara herself performed in public, including performances at the Sing-Akademie zu Berlin, from its foundation by Carl Friedrich Christian Fasch in 1791 until her retirement in 1810. Fasch's successor as director of the Sing-Akademie was Carl Friedrich Zelter, another devotee of Bach who later became Mendelssohn's teacher and mentor. Zelter ensured that Bach's organ works featured in the institution's Ripienschule instrumental concerts: both BWV 525 and BWV 526 were included in the concert programme. The collections of Bachiana of Sara Levy and C. P. E. Bach became part of the Sing-Akademie's library, now held in the Berlin State Library.

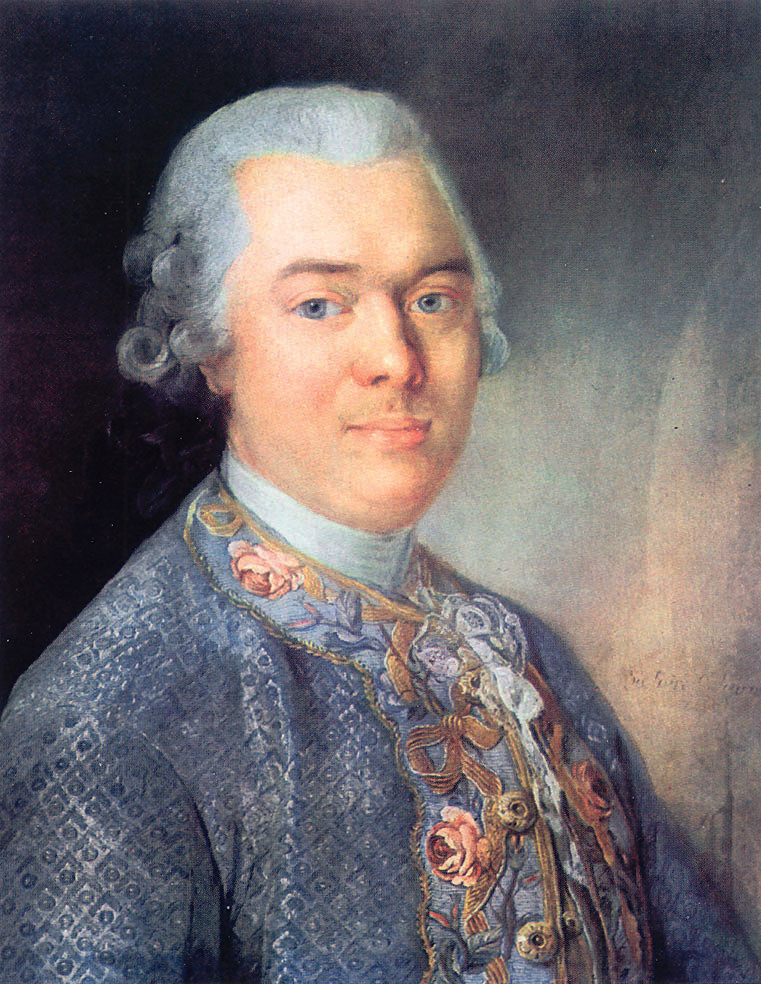
Gottfried van Swieten

The fair copy made by Wilhelm Friedemann Bach and Anna Magdalena Bach was probably disseminated through Bach's biographer Johann Nikolaus Forkel and the Austrian Ambassador to Berlin, Baron Gottfried van Swieten. van Swieten, an avid collector of music, knew Kirnberger and Princess Anna Amalia from Berlin and had brought back to Vienna several hand copies of Bach manuscripts of keyboard and organ works, including a transcription of the organ sonatas for two keyboards: van Swieten's large collection of musical manuscripts is now preserved in the Imperial Library, which he directed from 1777 onwards. In late eighteenth century Vienna renewed interest amongst the musical intelligentsia in the "old music" of Bach had given rise to weekly meetings of a musical salon run by van Swieten; in 1782 the young Wolfgang Amadeus Mozart became an active participant. In both Berlin and Vienna it had become fashionable to play Bach in arrangements more suited for domestic performance. Mozart himself made string quartet arrangements of some of the fugues in The Well-Tempered Clavier; and three of the movements in the string trios for violin, viola and cello, K. 404a, are transcriptions of movements from the organ sonatas (BWV 527/ii, BWV 526/ii and BWV 526/iii).

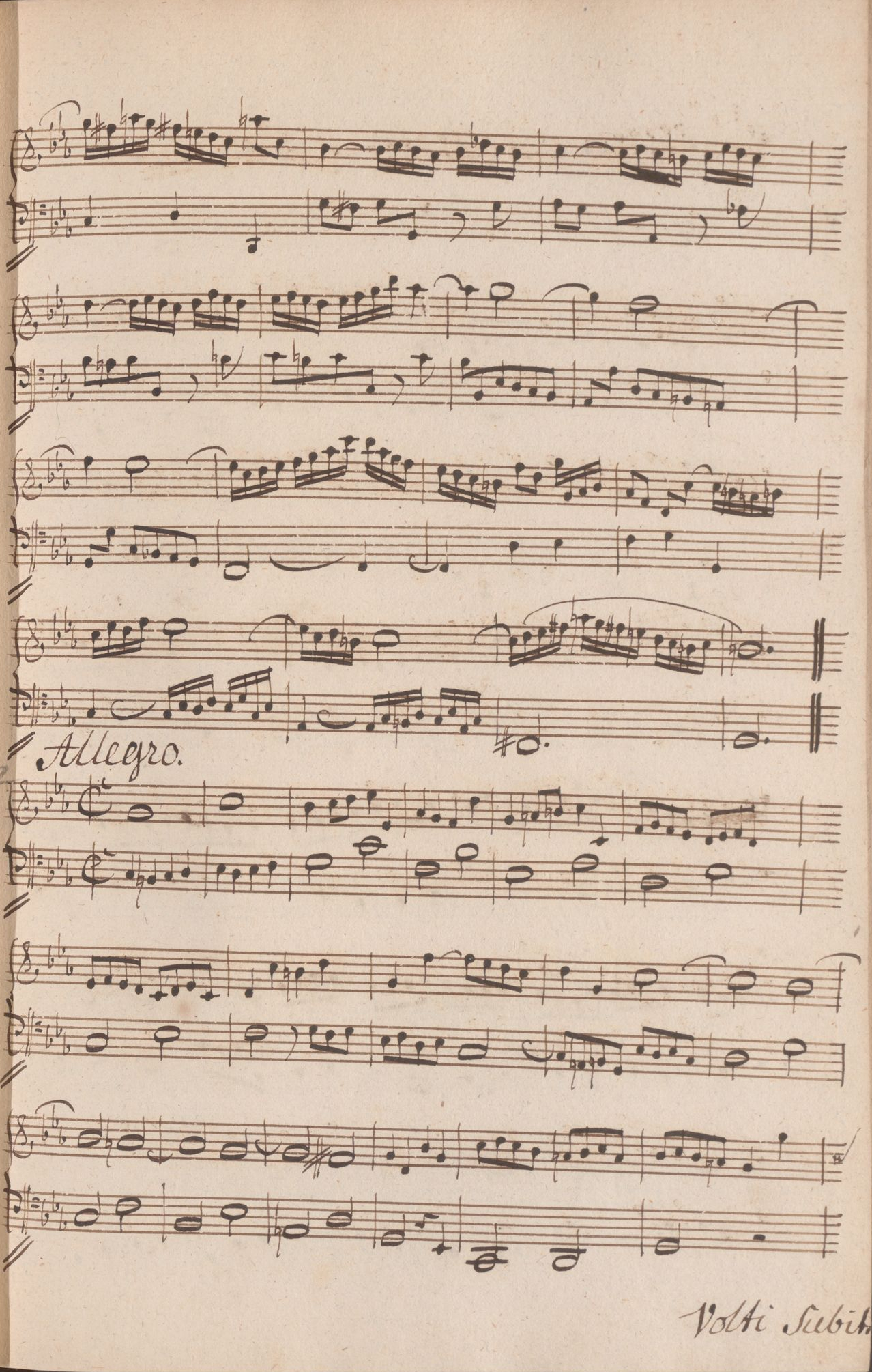
Page from Primo part with end of BWV 526/ii and start of BWV 526/iii in arrangement for two harpsichords from collection of Fanny von Arnstein, ONB, Vienna

The string trios K. 404a have not been included in the Neue Mozart-Ausgabe of 2010. Their previous inclusion in the catalogue of Mozart's works, following the assessments of the musicologists Wilhelm Rust in the nineteenth century and Alfred Einstein in the twentieth century, was challenged in the 1960s due to problems in authenticating the authorship of the newly composed slow movements preceding the fugal movements. In addition it was assumed that the sources for the organ sonatas used in the transcriptions were those brought back to Vienna by Baron van Swieten. Wolff (2012a) has suggested that Mozart's special circumstances in Vienna in 1782 point with high probability to a quite different version of events, which makes Mozart's authorship of K. 404a far more likely.

Mozart's contacts with the Bach circle date back to the concert tour with his sister and father when they stayed in London from April 1764 until July 1765. The eight year old Mozart played before George III. In his second recital he was requested to perform compositions by Bach's son Johann Christian Bach—the "London Bach"—who befriended the family during their visit. In 1781 in Vienna he came into contact with the Itzig family. Sara's older sister Fanny had moved to Vienna in 1776 following her marriage to the Viennese banker Adam Nathan Arnstein. She attended the musical salons of Baron van Swieten and brought with her from Berlin her extensive personal collection of Bach family manuscripts. These included the arrangement of the organ sonatas for two harpsichords; and the Itzig family collection of manuscripts in Berlin frequently had volumes containing fugues from The Well-Tempered Clavier fugues bound with fugues by Bach's two eldest sons. In August 1781 Mozart took up lodgings with his fortepiano in "a very prettily furnished room" (ein recht hüpsches eingerichtetes zimmer) in the servants' quarters on the third floor of the Arnstein family mansion "auf dem Graben". He remained there for eleven months: his letter to his father of 10 April concerning van Zwieten's Sunday salons dates from that period. Wolff considers it likely that Mozart's involvement in van Zwieten's salon came about through Fanny van Arnstein; and that, while lodging with her, Mozart would have had access to her library and in particular the Bach manuscripts on which K. 404a is based.

== Arrangements and transcriptions ==
- Reconstruction of BWV 525/1, BWV 1032/2 and BWV 525/3 as trio sonata in B♭ major for alto recorder/transverse flute, oboe/violin and continuo (bassoon/viola da gamba and harpsichord), Klaus Hofmann, 2006, Breitkopf & Härtel.
- Arrangement of early versions of BWV 525/1, BWV 1032/2 and BWV 525/3 for violin, cello and continuo from mid 18th century sources; in his commentary on sources, Klaus Hofmann and other Bach scholars have questioned the authenticity of this arrangement (see also Concerto, BWV 525a).
- Arrangement of BWV 525–530 for two pianos, Victor Babin, 1942, Boosey and Hawkes
- Arrangement of BWV 530 for solo piano, Béla Bartók, Editio Musica Budapest
- Arrangement of BWv 529–530 for solo piano, Fred Davis
- Arrangement of BWV 529/2 for piano solo, Samuil Feinberg
- Arrangement of BWV 525–526 for piano solo, Hermann Keller, Steingräber
- Arrangement of BWV 525–530 for piano solo, Bernhard Kistler-Liebendörfer
- Arrangement of BWV 525 for piano duet (3 hands), György Kurtág, Editio Musica Budapest
- Arrangements of BWV 530/1 and BWV 530/3 for two pianos, Alexej Parussinof
- Arrangements of BWV 525–530 for piano duet (3 hands), 1809–10 Charles Frederick Horn and Samuel Wesley
- Suite No.5 (BWV 529/1, BWV 528/2, BWV 530/1) for string orchestra, Henry Wood
- Reconstruction of BWV 528 as trio sonata for oboe d'amore, viola da gamba and harpsichord, Pieter Dirksen, 2013, Breitkopf & Härtel.
- Arrangement of BWV 530 as a double concerto for two violins, string orchestra and basso continuo, Guillaume Rebinguet-Sudre, Ensemble baroque Atlantique, 2015
- Arrangement of BWV 528/2 for piano solo, August Stradal. There are numerous recorded performances of the organ sonatas by chamber groups involving different combinations of instruments and sometimes involving transposition of Bach's individual parts.

== Selected recordings ==
- Marie-Claire Alain, Trio sonatas, Erato, 1986, 1 CD,
- Bernard Foccroulle, Complete Organ Works of Bach, Ricercar
- Ton Koopman, Trio sonatas, Deutsche Grammophon, 1999, 1 CD.
- André Isoir, J. S. Bach: The Concertante Organ, Sinfonias, sonatas & concertos, La Dolce Volta: LDV1180, 2013, 3-CD set.
- André Isoir, Trio sonatas, Calliope, 2-CD set.
- Helmut Walcha, Complete Organ Works of Bach, Deutsche Grammophon Archiv, E4637122

Selected arrangements

- Julian Bream (lute) and George Malcolm (harpsichord), BWV 525 and 529, RCA Records, 1969.
- Jean-Pierre Rampal and Robert Veyron-Lacroix, for flute and harpsichord, Erato, 1981 (available as CD 15 of Rampal's Complete Recordings for Erato, Vol.3, 1970–1982).
- Purcell Quartet. Chandos, 2002.
- Alfredo Bernardini (oboe d'amore). Cassandra Luckhardt (viola da gamba) and Pieter Dirksen (harpsichord), BWV 528, Etcetera, 2009.
- Le Concert Français, for alto recorder, violin, viola da gamba and harpsichord, BWV 525, 528, 529 and 530, Naive.
- Samuel Feinberg, The Art of Samuel Feinberg, Vol. 3, BWV 528/2, Classical Records (Feinberg playing his own arrangement, also recorded by many other pianists)
- Arthur Grumiaux (violin), Georges Janzer (viola), Eva Czako (cello), Mozart's Preludes and Fugues for String Trio, K404a, Philips
- The Brook Street Band: Rachel Harris, Farran Scott (violins), Tatty Theo (cello) and Carolyn Gibley (harpsichord), AVIE Records, 2010.
- E. Power Biggs (pedal harpsichord), Essential Classics, Sony Records, 1967.
- Stefan Palm (pedal harpsichord), Amphion Records, 2001.
- David Ponsford and David Hill (harpsichords), BWV 525–530, Nimbus Records, 2020.
- Rebecca Cypess (harpsichord) and Yi-heng Yang (fortepiano), "In Sara Levy's Salon", BWV 526, Acis, 2017.

== Notes and references ==
=== Sources ===
Published editions

- Bach, J. S. (1815), Nägeli, Hans Georg (ed.), Practische Orgelschule enthaltend Sechs Sonaten, Zürich
- Bach, J. S. (2004). Klaus Engler (ed.). 6 Partiten, BWV 825–830. Wiener Urtext Edition. Schott/Universal Edition. (contains detailed preface by Engler)
- Bach, J. S. (2010), Dirksen, Peter (ed.), Sonatas, Trios, Concertos, Complete Organ Works (Breitkopf Urtext), vol. 5 EB 8805, Wiesbaden: Breitkopf & Härtel, ISMN 979-0-004-18366-3 Introduction Archived 2015-09-13 at the Wayback Machine (in German and English) • Commentary Archived 2023-01-09 at the Wayback Machine (English translation—commentary in paperback original is in German)
- Bach, J. S. (2013), Dirksen, Peter (ed.), Trio Sonata in G minor for oboe d'amore [oboe], viola da gamba [viola] and continuo [realised]. Reconstruction based on BWV 76/8 and 528, Wiesbaden: Breitkopf & Härtel (Preface Archived 2016-09-18 at the Wayback Machine)
- Bach, J. S. (2014), Stauffer, George B. (ed.), Six Trio Sonatas and Miscellaneous Trios, Wayne Leupold Editions, ISMN 9790800017025. Early variants of movements Archived 2016-10-26 at the Wayback Machine, designated BWV 525/1a, BWV 517/1a, BWV 528/2a, BWV 528/2b and BWV 529/2a
- Kilian, Dietrich (1988). Johann Sebastian Bach. Neue Ausgabe Sämtlicher Werke (in German). Vol. 7, Serie IV. Sechs Sonaten und verschiedene Einzelwerke. Kritischer Bericht. Kassel: Bärenreiter.
- Mozart, W. A. (2010), "Vorwort", in Berke, Dietrich; Bödeker, Anke; Ferguson, Faye; Leisinger, Ulrich (eds.), Bearbeitungen und Ergänzungen von Werken verschiedener Komponisten, Wolfgang Amadeus Mozart. Neue Ausgabe sämtlicher Werke (NMA) (in German), vol. X/28/3-5, 2, Bärenreiter, pp. XV–XVI, ISMN 9790006546978.

Books and journal articles

- Breig, Werner (1999), "Bachs berufliche Basis. Die Orgelmusik: Freie Orgelwerke", in Küster, Konrad (ed.), Bach-Handbuch, Kassel: Bärenreiter, pp. 678–688
- Crocker, Richard L. (1986), A History of Musical Style (2nd ed.), Dover Publications, ISBN 0486173240
- David, Hans Theodore; Mendel, Arthur; Wolff, Christoph (1998), The New Bach Reader (Revised ed.), W.W. Norton, ISBN 0393319563
- Deutsch, Otto Erich (1965), Mozart: A Documentary Biography, translated by Eric Blom; Peter Branscombe; Jeremy Noble, Stanford University Press
- Dirst, Matthew (2012), Engaging Bach: The Keyboard Legacy from Marpurg to Mendelssohn, Cambridge University Press, ISBN 978-0521651608
- Finscher, Ludwig (1989), "Bach in the eighteenth century", in Franklin, Don O. (ed.), Bach Studies, Cambridge University Press, pp. 281–296, ISBN 0521341051
- Hofmann, Klaus (1999). "Ein verschollenes Kammermusikwerk Johann Sebastian Bachs: Zur Fassungsgeschichte der Orgelsonate Es-Dur (BWV 525) und der Sonate A-Dur für Flöte und Cembalo (BWV 1032)" [A lost chamber music work by Johann Sebastian Bach: On the genesis of the organ sonata in E-flat major (BWV 525) and the sonata in A major for flute and harpsichord (BWV 1032)]. In Schulze, Hans-Joachim; Wolff, Christoph (eds.). Bach-Jahrbuch 1999 [Bach Yearbook 1999]. Bach-Jahrbuch (in German). Vol. 85. Leipzig: Neue Bachgesellschaft. pp. 67–79. doi:10.13141/bjb.v1999. ISBN 3-374-01763-0. ISSN 0084-7682.
- Jones, Richard D. P. (2007), The Creative Development of Johann Sebastian Bach, Volume I: 1695–1717: Music to Delight the Spirit, Oxford University Press, ISBN 9780198164401
- Sackmann, Dominik (2000), Bach und Corelli: Studien zu Bachs Rezeption von Corellis Violinsonaten op. 5 unter besonderer Berücksichtigung der "Sogenannten Arnstädter Orgelchoräle" und der langsamen Konzertsätze, Musikwissenschaftliche Schriften (in German), vol. 36, Katzbichler, ISBN 3873970953
- Speerstra, Joel (2004), Bach and the Pedal Clavichord: an Organist's Guide, University of Rochester Press, ISBN 1-58046-135-2
- Stauffer, George B. (2016), "Miscellaneous organ trios from Bach's Leipzig workshop", in Dirst, Matthew (ed.), Bach and the Organ, Bach Perspectives, vol. 10, University of Illinois Press, pp. 39–59, ISBN 9780252040191, JSTOR 10.5406/j.ctt18j8xkb
- Stinson, Russell (2006), The reception of Bach's organ works from Mendelssohn to Brahms, Oxford University Press, ISBN 0-19-517109-8
- Stinson, Russell (2012), J. S. Bach at His Royal Instrument: Essays on His Organ Works, Oxford University Press, pp. 108–111, ISBN 9780199917235, Chapter VII, "Aspects of Reception from Bach's Day to the Present"
- Swack, Jeanne R. (1993), "On the Origins of the "Sonate auf Concertenart"", Journal of the American Musicological Society, 46 (3): 369–414, doi:10.2307/831926, JSTOR 831926
- Walton, Chris (2007), Richard Wagner's Zurich: The Muse of Place, Camden House, ISBN 978-1571133311
- Williams, Peter F. (1985). The Organ Music of J. S. Bach. Vol. 1 (1st paperback ed.). Cambridge: Cambridge University Press. pp. 103–112. ISBN 9780521317009.
- Williams, Peter (1980). The Organ Music of J. S. Bach. Vol. 1, Preludes, Toccatas, Fantasias, Fugues, Sonatas, Concertos and Miscellaneous Pieces. Cambridge University Press. ISBN 0521217237.
- Williams, Peter (2003), The Organ Music of J. S. Bach (2nd ed.), Cambridge University Press, ISBN 0-521-89115-9
- Wolff, Christoph (1994), "Bach's Leipzig Chamber Music", Bach: Essays on His Life and Work, Harvard University Press, p. 263, ISBN 0674059263 (a reprint of a 1985 publication in Early Music)
- Wolff, Christoph (2012a), "Mozart 1782, Fanny Arnstein und viermal Bach", Mozart-Jahrbuch 2009–2010, Bärenreiter, pp. 141–148
- Wolff, Christoph (2012b), Mozart at the Gateway to His Fortune: Serving the Emperor, 1788-1791, W. W. Norton, ISBN 978-0393084108
- Wollny, Peter (1993), "Sara Levy and the Making of Musical Taste in Berlin", The Musical Quarterly, 77 (4): 651–688, doi:10.1093/mq/77.4.651, JSTOR 742352
- Yearsley, David (1998), "The Organ Music of J. S. Bach", in Thistlethwaite, Nicholas; Webber, Geoffrey (eds.), The Cambridge Companion to the Organ, Cambridge University Press, pp. 236–249, ISBN 0521575842
- Yearsley, David (2002), Bach and the meanings of counterpoint, New perspectives in music history and criticism, vol. 10, Cambridge University Press, ISBN 0-521-80346-2
- Zohn, Steven (2015), "Telemann and the Sonate auf Concertenart", Music for a Mixed Taste: Style, Genre, and Meaning in Telemann's Instrumental Works, Oxford University Press, pp. 283–334, ISBN 978-0190247850
