= Trio sonata =

Musical genre popular in the Baroque era

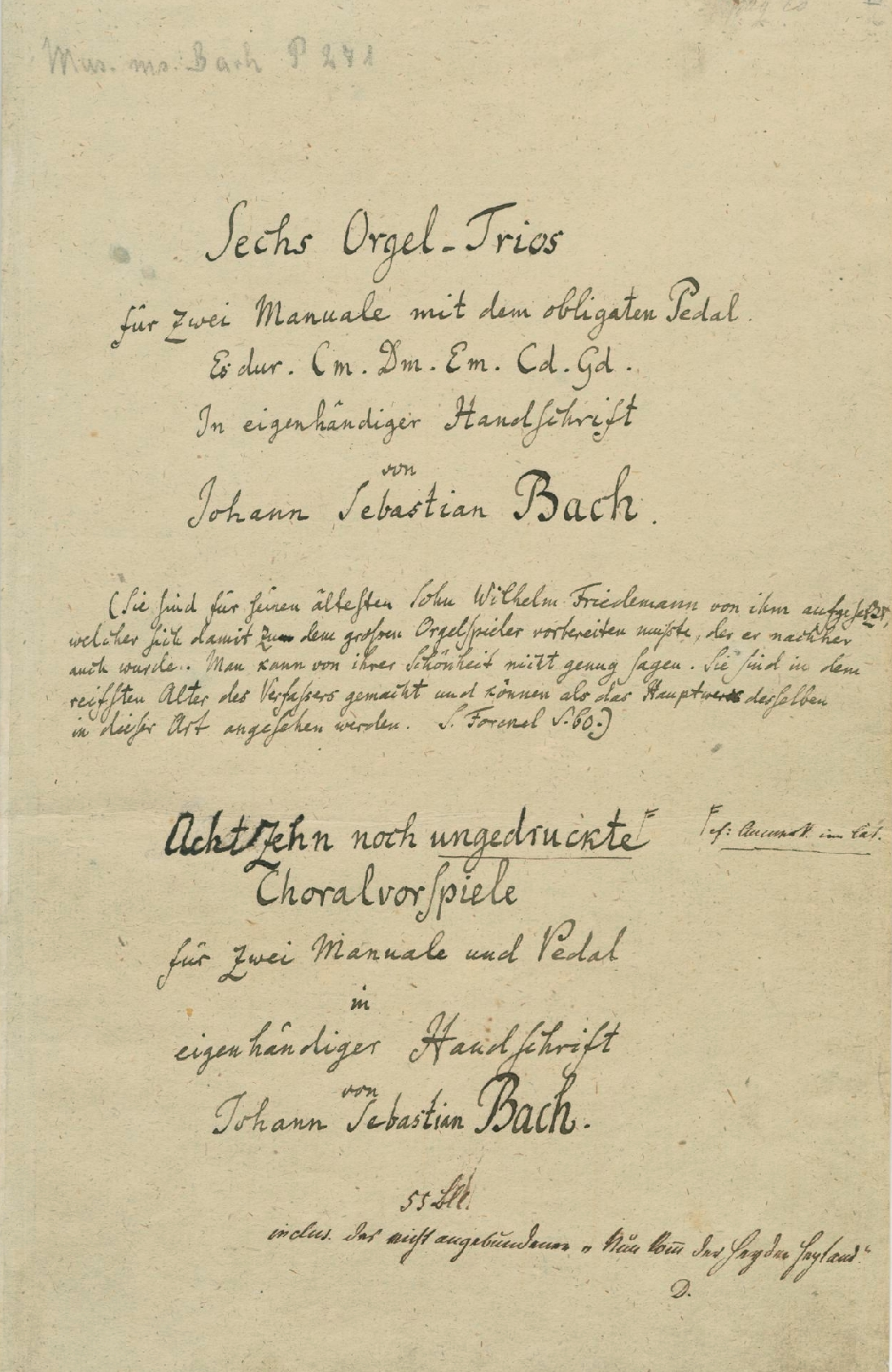
The title page of J.S Bach's autograph copy of the trio sonatas for organ, BWV 525-530

The trio sonata is a genre, typically consisting of several movements, with two melody instruments and basso continuo. It originated in the early 17th century and was a favorite chamber ensemble combination in the Baroque era.

== Basic structure ==
The trio sonata typically was written for two melody instruments (such as two violins) and basso continuo. However, either or both of the melody parts could be played on the flute, recorder, oboe, or even viola da gamba. The bass part, the continuo, typically involves two players. One player plays the bass line on a bass instrument such as a bass viol, violone, violoncello, or bassoon. The second player fills in harmonies above the bass line, using an instrument that can produce chords, such as a small organ, a harpsichord, or a theorbo. These chords are normally indicated to the player by placing numbers above the bass part rather than writing out the chords in full, a style of notation called figured bass.

Because there normally are two people playing the continuo part, there are usually four players in all. This accounts for the title of Henry Purcell's second collection, Ten Sonatas in Four Parts (1697); his first publication Sonnata's of III Parts (1683) likewise included separate parts for cello and keyboard. From about the middle of the 17th century two distinct types of sonatas appeared: sonata da camera (chamber sonata) and sonata da chiesa (church sonata). The sonata da camera was a suite of dances, while the sonata da chiesa had a typical four-movement structure of slow-fast-slow-fast.

== Composers, compositions and variant formats ==
The genre originated as instrumental adaptation of the three-part texture common in Italian vocal music in the late 16th century. The earliest published trio sonatas appeared in Venice (Salamone Rossi Il primo libro delle sinfonie e gagliarde, 1607) and in Milan (Giovanni Paolo Cima, Sonata a tre for violin, cornett and continuo in the collection Concerti ecclesiastici, 1610).

=== Arcangelo Corelli ===
Corelli: Trio Sonata Op. 2 No. 11
I. Preludio. Adagio

II. Allemanda. Presto

III. Giga. Allegro

Italian composer Arcangelo Corelli was one of the most influential composers of the trio sonata. The published trio sonatas by Corelli are:

- Twelve Church Trio-Sonatas, Op. 1 (dedicated to Queen Christina of Sweden), published in Rome in 1681
- Twelve Chamber Trio-Sonatas, Op. 2 (dedicated to Cardinal Pamphili), published in Rome in 1685
- Twelve Church Trio-Sonatas, Op. 3 (dedicated to Francesco II d'Este, Duke of Modena), published in Rome in 1689
- Twelve Chamber Trio-Sonatas, Op. 4 (dedicated to Cardinal Ottoboni), published in Rome in 1694.

An additional collection of Trio Sonatas, for two violins, cello, and organ, was published as "Op. post." in Amsterdam, in 1714. Corelli's trios would serve as models for other composers well into the 18th century.

=== Johann Sebastian Bach ===
J.S. Bach: Organ Trio No. 1 in E♭ major, BWV 525
I. Allegro

II. Adagio

III. Allegro
All performed by Johannes-Ernst Köhler, Silbermann organ, Fraureuth

German composer Johann Sebastian Bach is another notable composer of the trio sonata, but he was known for shying away from the traditional structure of the sonata. He typically played the three parts with fewer than three instruments. One part could be played by a violin and the other two parts could be played by a keyboard, or all three parts could be played on the organ.

Trio sonatas by Bach include:

- Trio Sonatas for organ, BWV 525–530, combining all three parts on one instrument: typically the right hand, left hand and pedals will each take a different part thus creating the same texture as in a trio.
- A further innovation by Bach was the trio sonata involving a concertante (obbligato) right-hand harpsichord part in addition to the bass line, plus one melodic instrument, thus for two players. Examples are the Six Sonatas for Violin and Harpsichord, BWV 1014–1019, three sonatas for viola da gamba and harpsichord, BWV 1027–1029, and two sonatas for flute and harpsichord, BWV 1030 and 1032; BWV 1020, BWV 1031 and BWV 1033 are doubtful.
- Trio Sonatas BWV 1036–1040: BWV 1039 is a variant version of BWV 1027. The attribution of BWV 1036-1038 to Bach is doubtful, but all are typical of baroque chamber music.
- The mid-18th-century manuscript D-B Mus. ms. Bach St 345 contains a Concerto (or: Trio Sonata) in C major for violin, cello and continuo, arranged from (or: earlier version of) BWV 525/1, 1032/2 and 525/3 respectively. The 1998 edition of the Bach-Werke-Verzeichnis lists this version as BWV 525a, and considers the attribution of the arrangement to Bach doubtful. Based on the New Bach Edition, the Bach Digital website gives "BWV deest" instead of the BWV number 525a for this chamber music version.

=== Other composers ===
- Tomaso Albinoni, 12 sonatas da chiesa Op. 1, twelve balletti a tre Op. 3, six sonatas da camera as part of Op. 8, six unpublished trio sonatas Op. 11, and a further six trio sonatas without opus number in a manuscript in Vienna, Österreichische Nationalbibliothek, Musiksammlung.
- Carl Philipp Emanuel Bach wrote at least 44 trio sonatas, including one for flute, viola, and piano, said to have been given its world premiere by the Society for Forgotten Music at the New York Public Library on 30 January 1949. His best-known work in the genre is the programmatic Trio ("Sanguineus und Melancholicus"), in C minor, composed in 1749 and published in Nuremberg in 1751, which exists in two versions: one for obbligato keyboard and violin, the other for two violins and continuo. Trio Sonatas BWV 1036 and BWV 1038.
- William Boyce, 12 Trio Sonatas for two violins and continuo (1747).
- Dieterich Buxtehude, Op. 1, six sonatas, and Op. 2, seven sonatas, scored for violin, viola da gamba and basso continuo. These were the only works by Buxtehude that were published during his lifetime. Though real trio texture does occur from time to time, these are really sonate a due for violin and viola da gamba, with the continuo often being a simplification of the gamba part. There are however four genuine trio sonatas by Buxtehude surviving in manuscript, two for two violins, viola da gamba and continuo in C and G major (BuxWV 266 and 271), one for two violins and continuo in F major (BuxWV 270, fragmentary), and one for viola da gamba, viola, and continuo in D major (BuxWV 267).
- François Couperin published a number of trio sonatas: Le Parnasse, ou L’apothéose de Corelli, grande sonade en trio, for two violins and continuo (Paris, 1724); Concert instrumental sous le titre d’Apothéose composé à la mémoire immortelle de l’incomparable Monsieur de Lully, for two violins (two flutes, or other unspecified instruments), and continuo (Paris, 1725); and the collection Les nations: sonades et suites de simphonies en trio, for two violins and continuo (Paris, 1726), consisting of La Françoise [La pucelle], L’Espagnole [La visionnaire], L’impériale, and La Piemontoise [L’astrée]. In addition, two trio sonatas have survived in manuscript: La Steinquerque and La superbe, both for two violins and continuo.
- Jean-Marie Leclair :
  - JML.062 : trio sonata for 2 violins and bc, op. 4, n^{o} 1
  - JML.063 : trio sonata for 2 violins and bc, op. 4, n^{o} 2
  - JML.064 :trio sonata for 2 violins and bc, op. 4, n^{o} 3
  - JML.065 : trio sonata for 2 violins and bc, op. 4, n^{o} 4
  - JML.066 : trio sonata for 2 violins and bc, op. 4, n^{o} 5
  - JML.067 : trio sonata for 2 violins and bc, op. 4, n^{o} 6
  - JML.068 : Récréation de musique for 2 violins and bc (1), op. 6 (trio instrumental - ouverture en trio)
  - JML.070 : Ouverture for 2 violins and bc, op. 13, n^{o} 1 (trio instrumental - ouverture en trio)
  - JML.071 : Ouverture for 2 violins and bc, op. 13, n^{o} 3 (trio instrumental - ouverture en trio)
  - JML.072 : Ouverture for 2 violins and bc, op. 13, n^{o} 5 (trio instrumental - ouverture en trio)
- Domenico Gallo, 12 trio sonatas for two violins and continuo, long erroneously attributed to Pergolesi, some movements of which were arranged for Stravinsky's ballet Pulcinella.
- Johann Gottlieb Goldberg, a student of J. S. Bach, composed at least six trio sonatas. Four of these are for 2 violins and continuo, one of which used to be attributed to J. S. Bach, as BWV 1037. Two trio sonatas for flute, violin, and continuo are listed in a Breitkopf catalogue, but have gone missing.

Handel's Trio Sonata in B♭ major, Op. 2 No. 3, HWV 388: IV. Allegro
Performed by Les Arts Florissants

- George Frideric Handel, trio sonatas Op. 2 and 5, all in sonata da chiesa form. The attribution to Handel of the six trios HWV 380-385 for two oboes and continuo is doubtful, and the authenticity of the three trios HWV 393-395 is uncertain.
- Johann Adolf Hasse, 6 trio sonatas for two flutes (or violins) and continuo Op. 2 (1739) and 6 trio sonatas for two flutes (or violins) and continuo Op. 3 (1756).
- Jacques-Martin Hotteterre, Sonates en trio pour les flûtes traversières et a bec, violon, hautbois, Op. 3 (1712).
- Pietro Antonio Locatelli, six Trio Sonatas, Op. 5, for two violins or two traversos and continuo (1736).
- Johann Pachelbel, Musikalische Ergötzung ("Musical Delight"), containing six suites for two violins and basso continuo, each commencing with a sonata, followed by a succession of dances. The violin parts use scordatura tuning. The sonatas are of two types. Nos. 1 and 3 are marked Allegro, and are fughettas. The remaining four are Adagio movements and are similar to French overtures, in two sections.
- Henry Purcell, Sonnata's of III Parts, 1683, ten sonatas in four parts, 1697, but both sets are scored for two violins, bass viol, and organ or harpsichord. In terms of style, Purcell's trio sonatas are conservative, modeled on the older generation of Italians (Giovanni Legrenzi, Lelio Colista, and Giovanni Battista Vitali) rather than Corelli or Giovanni Battista Bassani.
- Jean-Féry Rebel :
  - JFR.30 : La Flore (trio sonata)
  - JFR.31 : La Vénus (trio sonata)
  - JFR.32 : L'Apollon (trio sonata)
  - JFR.33 : La Junon (trio sonata)
  - JFR.34 : La Pallas (trio sonata)
  - JFR.35 : L'Immortelle (trio sonata)
  - JFR.36 : Tombeau de Monsieur de Lully (trio sonata)
- Gottfried Heinrich Stölzel, over 25 extant trio sonatas, including two for solo organ. Others for continuo (sometimes indicated as harpsichord) and diverse combinations of flute(s), violin(s), oboes or unspecified instruments.

TWV 42 F7 #I
(freepats sound from a Libre art score)

- Georg Philipp Telemann, around 100 trio sonatas in TWV 42. The earliest sonatas exhibit the Corelli style most clearly, while later works anticipate the mid-century Empfindsamkeit and galant styles, or mix Italian, French, and Polish styles.
- Antonio Vivaldi, 12 trio sonatas da camera Op. 1, two trio sonatas mixed with four solo sonatas in Op. 5, and thirteen unpublished trios. One further trio sonata, RV 80, in G major, for two flutes and continuo, is attributed to Vivaldi but is probably spurious.
- Jan Dismas Zelenka, six sonatas, ZWV 181, composed around 1721–1722.

== Sources ==
- Anon. 1949. "Bach Trio Sonata Heard". The New York Times (31 January): 15.
- Bach, Johann Sebastian (et al.?). 1740–1760. Sonaten. Arr.; vl, vlc, b; C-Dur ("Concerto"; nach BWV 525 und 1032), Mus. ms. Bach St 345 (olim: Mus. ms. Bach P 914), Bach Digital, Berlin State Library. RISM 467234500.
- Bonta, Stephen, and Steven Zohn. 2003. "Trio Sonata". The Harvard Dictionary of Music, fourth edition, edited by Don Michael Randal. Cambridge, MA: Harvard University Press ISBN 0-674-01163-5.
- Boyce, William. 1747. Twelve Sonatas for Two Violins; With a Bass for the Violoncello or Harpsicord. London: John Walsh.
- Breig, Werner. 1997. "Ensemble Sonatas", pp. 128–131 in The Cambridge Companion to Bach edited by John Butt. Cambridge University Press. ISBN 0521587808.
- Deas, Stewart. 1953. "Arcangelo Corelli". Music & Letters 34, no. 1 (January): 1–10.
- Dürr, Alfred (1954). "Johann Gottlieb Goldberg und die Triosonate BWV 1037" [Johann Gottlieb Goldberg and the trio sonata BWV 1037]. In Dürr, Alfred; Neumann, Werner (eds.). Bach-Jahrbuch 1953 [Bach Yearbook 1953]. Bach-Jahrbuch (in German). Vol. 40. Neue Bachgesellschaft. Berlin: Evangelische Verlagsanstalt. pp. 51–80. doi:10.13141/bjb.v1953.
- Dürr, Alfred, and Yoshitake Kobayashi (ed.). Bach Werke Verzeichnis: Kleine Ausgabe – Nach der von Wolfgang Schmieder vorgelegten 2. Ausgabe (Bach Works Catalogue: Small Edition – After Wolfgang Schmieder's 2nd edition), with a preface in English and German, Kirsten Beißwenger, collaborator. BWV^{2a}. Wiesbaden: Breitkopf & Härtel. ISBN 9783765102493.
- Editors of Encyclopædia Britannica. 2007. "Trio Sonata". Encyclopædia Britannica (March 29). Britannica.com. Retrieved July 21, 2017.
- Giannini, Tula. "Hotteterre family [Haulteterre, Hauterre, Hauteterre, Hoteterre, Hoterre, Obterre, etc.]: (4) Jacques(-Martin) Hotteterre (ii) ['le Romain']". The New Grove Dictionary of Music and Musicians, second edition, edited by Stanley Sadie and John Tyrrell. London: Macmillan Publishers.
- Hicks, Anthony. 2001. "Handel [Händel, Hendel], George Frideric [Georg Friederich]". The New Grove Dictionary of Music and Musicians, second edition, edited by Stanley Sadie and John Tyrrell. London: Macmillan Publishers.
- Higginbottom, Edward. 2001. "Couperin [le grand], François(ii)". The New Grove Dictionary of Music and Musicians, second edition, edited by Stanley Sadie and John Tyrrell. London: Macmillan Publishers.
- Hofmann, Klaus. 2006. New Bach Edition, Series VI: Chamber Music, Vol. 5: Various Chamber Music Works, Critical Commentary, p. 98, cited in Bach Digital Work 01718 at Bach Digital website
- Holman, Peter, Robert Thompson, and Mark Humphreys. 2001. "Purcell, § 3: Henry Purcell (ii)". The New Grove Dictionary of Music and Musicians, second edition, edited by Stanley Sadie and John Tyrrell. London: Macmillan Publishers.
- Works by Georg Philipp Telemann at the International Music Score Library Project (IMSLP)
- Locatelli, Pietro Antonio. 1736. Sei Sonate à Trè, o Due Violini, o Due Flauti Traversi, è Basso per il Cembalo. Amsterdam: (published by the composer).
- Mangsen, Sandra. 2001. "Trio Sonata". The New Grove Dictionary of Music and Musicians, second edition, edited by Stanley Sadie and John Tyrrell. London: Macmillan Publishers.
- Mattheson, Johann. 1739. Der Vollkommene Capellmeister. Hamburg: Christian Herold.
- Nolte, Ewald V., John Butt, and H. Joseph Butler. 2001. "Pachelbel: (1) Johann Pachelbel [Bachelbel]". The New Grove Dictionary of Music and Musicians, second edition, edited by Stanley Sadie and John Tyrrell. London: Macmillan Publishers.
- Rubin, Norman. 2001. "Goldberg [Gollberg, Goltberg, etc.], Johann Gottlieb [Théophile]". The New Grove Dictionary of Music and Musicians, second edition, edited by Stanley Sadie and John Tyrrell. London: Macmillan Publishers.
- Snyder, Kerala J. 2001. "Buxtehude, Dieterich". The New Grove Dictionary of Music and Musicians, second edition, edited by Stanley Sadie and John Tyrrell. London: Macmillan Publishers.
- Stölzel, Gottfried Heinrich. c.1700–1799a. Sonata 1 (−2) à 3. / Due Flauti traversi. / Con il / Fondamento, Ms. Instr. mus. i hs. 59:11–12 at Uppsala University Library (Carolina Rediviva). RISM 190025778.
- Stölzel, Gottfried Heinrich. c.1700–1799b. Sonata 3 (−4) à 3. / Flauto traverso / Violino / con il / Fondamento. Ms. Instr. mus. i hs. 59:13–14 at Uppsala University Library (Carolina Rediviva). RISM 190025781.
- Stölzel, Gottfried Heinrich. c.1720–1750. Sonata / a / Oboe / Violino / con / Cembalo, Ms. Mus.2450-Q-6 (olim: Mus.c.Cx 842, Schrank II/23/7, Rötel 7) at Saxon State and University Library Dresden (Königliche Privat-Musikaliensammlung, Sonatas). RISM 212002969.
- Stölzel, Gottfried Heinrich. c.1740. Zwei Trio-Sonaten, Ms. Am.B 411c at Berlin State Library (Amalien-Bibliothek). RISM 452505437.
- Stölzel, Gottfried Heinrich. c.1750. Sechs, (corrected in pencil): Elf Trio-Sonaten/ in / Partitur / für die Orgel, Ms. Am.B 411a at Berlin State Library (Amalien-Bibliothek). RISM 452505424.
- Stölzel, Gottfried Heinrich. c.1760a. Nro. 50. 51. und 52. / III. / Trio. / Violino. & Fl. Traverso. 1. / Violino. & Fl. Traverso 2. / et / Cembalo. Ms. Am.B 411d at Berlin State Library (Amalien-Bibliothek). RISM 452505440.
- Stölzel, Gottfried Heinrich. c.1760b. Two Sonatas for violin, flute, and continuo, Ms. Am.B 500 at Berlin State Library (Amalien-Bibliothek). RISM 452506216.
- Stölzel, Gottfried Heinrich. ca.1770. Trio / dal / Sigre / Stoel / zel. Ms. Am.B 469 at Berlin State Library (Amalien-Bibliothek). RISM 452505898.
- Stölzel, Gottfried Heinrich. n.d. Sonata a tre for two violins and continuo, Ms. XXXIV B 342 at Národní muzeum, Prague (České muzeum hudby, hudebně-historické oddělení). RISM 550041276.
- Talbot, Michael. 2001a. "Albinoni, Tomaso Giovanni [Zuane]". The New Grove Dictionary of Music and Musicians, second edition, edited by Stanley Sadie and John Tyrrell. London: Macmillan Publishers.
- Talbot, Michael. 2001b. "Corelli, Arcangelo". The New Grove Dictionary of Music and Musicians, second edition, edited by Stanley Sadie and John Tyrrell. London: Macmillan Publishers.
- Talbot, Michael. 2001c. "Vivaldi, Antonio (Lucio)". The New Grove Dictionary of Music and Musicians, second edition, edited by Stanley Sadie and John Tyrrell. London: Macmillan Publishers.
- Van Boer, Bertil H. 2012. Historical Dictionary of Music of the Classical Period. Lanham, Maryland: Scarecrow Press ISBN 978-0-8108-7183-0.
- Vetter, Roger. n.d. "Baroque Trio Sonata". Retrieved on 7 May 2020.
- Wolff, Christoph, and Ulrich Leisinger. 2001. "Bach, Carl Philipp Emanuel". The New Grove Dictionary of Music and Musicians, second edition, edited by Stanley Sadie and John Tyrrell. London: Macmillan Publishers.
- Zelenka, Jan Dismas (autograph). [1721–22]. 6 Sonatas, Ms. Mus.2358-Q-1 at Saxon State and University Library Dresden (Königliche Privat-Musikaliensammlung). RISM 211010356.
- Zohn, Steven. 2001. "Telemann, Georg Philipp, § 8: Instrumental Music". The New Grove Dictionary of Music and Musicians, second edition, edited by Stanley Sadie and John Tyrrell. London: Macmillan Publishers.
