= Erich Piasetzki =

Musician

Erich Piasetzki (6 July 1932, East Prussia, – 3 December 2007, Berlin) was a German organist and church musician. In 1954–1958, he studied church music at the Hochschule für Musik Hanns Eisler Berlin in Berlin-Charlottenburg, where he was a pupil of the organist Hans Heintze. In Berlin, he also studied with the Swiss harpsichordist Silvia Kind. After 1958 he became choral director and organist at the Offenbarungskirche, in Friedrichshain, Berlin. He served as organ consultant in 1959–1982 for the district of Berlin-Brandenburg, becoming Kirchenmusikdirektor (director of church music) in 1967. Piasetzki has performed organ concerts all over Europe and the US and became known in the 1960s and 1970s for his recordings of the music of Johann Sebastian Bach on Silbermann organs in Saxony.
