= Hans Otto (organist) =

German cantor and organist (1922–1996)

Hans Otto (29 September 1922, Leipzig–29 October 1996, Freiberg, Saxony) was a German organist, harpsichordist and cantor.

== Life and music ==
Born in Leipzig, Hans Otto was a member of the Thomanerchor, the choir of the St. Thomas Church, Leipzig. Between 1945 and 1948 he studied under the organist Karl Straube at the Institute of Church Music of the University of Music and Theatre Leipzig. After a short spell at the Emmauskirche in Leipzig, Otto moved to Dresden in 1948 as choirmaster, organist and cantor at the Heilig-Geist-Kirche. He remained there until 1968, while still teaching organ pupils at the Dresden Institute of Church Music until 1976. In 1968 he was appointed as Kirchenmusikdirektor (KMD, director of church music) and organist at Freiberg Cathedral. Fifteen years later he became organist at the Georg Philipp Telemann Concert Hall in Magdeburg.

His public duties involved all matters concerning church music in the region. Over many years he collaborated with the Dresdner Kreuzchor and their choral conductor Rudolf Mauersberger. In addition to numerous organ concerts, Otto has become known for his recordings of the music of Johann Sebastian Bach on Silbermann organs in Saxony.

In 1980 he was recognized by an Art Prize of the German Democratic Republic.
