= Concerto, BWV 525a =

The Concerto, BWV 525a (alternatively: BWV deest), is a trio sonata in C major for violin, cello and basso continuo, based on material otherwise found in Johann Sebastian Bach's first Organ Sonata, BWV 525 (outer movements), and Flute Sonata in A major, BWV 1032 (middle movement). The oldest extant manuscript containing the BWV 525a arrangement, D-B Mus.ms. Bach St 345, is dated to the middle of the 18th century. Although this version of Bach's sonata movements may have originated during his lifetime in the circle around him, it seems unlikely that the composer supervised, or even ordered, the manufacture of the string trio adaptation, thus the arrangement has been listed in BWV Anh. II, that is the Anhang (Anh.) of doubtful works, in the 1998 edition of the Bach-Werke-Verzeichnis (BWV). Breitkopf & Härtel published BWV 525a in 1965. Digital facsimiles of 18th- and 19th-century manuscript copies of the arrangement, in which the sonata is titled "Concerto", became available in the 21st century.

== Sources ==
- "Concerto, C BWV deest (NBA Serie VI:10) after BWV 525/1, 1032/2, 525/3". Bach Digital. Leipzig: Bach Archive; et al. 2019-02-15.
- "D-B Mus.ms. Bach St 345". Bach Digital. Leipzig: Bach Archive; et al. 2020-01-09.
- Dürr, Alfred; Kobayashi, Yoshitake, eds. (1998). Bach Werke Verzeichnis: Kleine Ausgabe – Nach der von Wolfgang Schmieder vorgelegten 2. Ausgabe [Bach Works Catalogue: Small Edition – After Wolfgang Schmieder's 2nd edition] (in German). Kirsten Beißwenger (collaborator). (BWV^{2a} ed.). Wiesbaden: Breitkopf & Härtel. ISBN 9783765102493. Preface in English and German.
- Hellmann, Diethard, ed. (1965). Johann Sebastian Bach: Concerto (Triosonate) für Violine, Violoncello und Basso continuo C-dur (BWV 525a) [Johann Sebastian Bach: Concerto (Trio sonata) for violin, cello and basso continuo in C major (BWV 525a)] (in German). Breitkopf & Härtel. ISMN 979-0-004-16727-4. EB 6466.
- Hofmann, Klaus (1999). "Ein verschollenes Kammermusikwerk Johann Sebastian Bachs: Zur Fassungsgeschichte der Orgelsonate Es-Dur (BWV 525) und der Sonate A-Dur für Flöte und Cembalo (BWV 1032)" [A lost chamber music work by Johann Sebastian Bach: On the genesis of the organ sonata in E-flat major (BWV 525) and the sonata in A major for flute and harpsichord (BWV 1032)]. In Schulze, Hans-Joachim; Wolff, Christoph (eds.). Bach-Jahrbuch 1999 [Bach Yearbook 1999]. Bach-Jahrbuch (in German). Vol. 85. Neue Bachgesellschaft, Bach Archive. Leipzig: Evangelische Verlagsanstalt. pp. 67–79. doi:10.13141/bjb.v1999. ISBN 3-374-01763-0. ISSN 0084-7682.
