= Johannes-Ernst Köhler =

German musician and organist (1910–1990)

Johannes-Ernst Köhler (22 June 1910 –12 September 1990; also Johannes Ernst Köhler) was a German organist, cantor and organ teacher in Weimar.

== Career and music ==
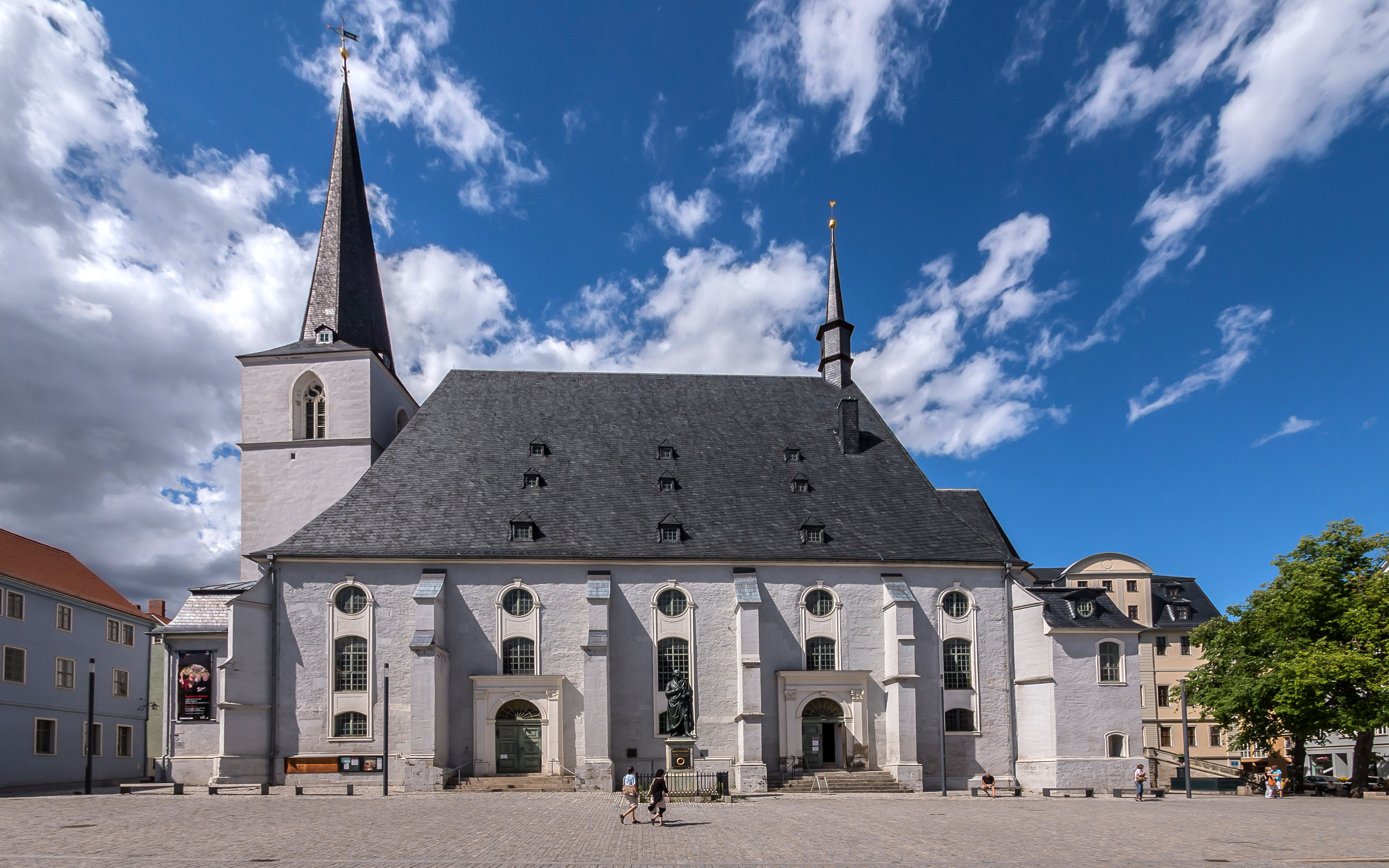
The Herderkirche in Weimar, where Köhler was organist for over forty years

Allegro moderato, Trio Sonata in G major, BWV 1027a • 3:18
Johannes-Ernst Köhler, Silbermann organ, Fraureuth

Köhler was born in 1910 in Meran in the South Tyrol, then part of Austria; after the First World War, it became part of Italy. During 1929–1933, Köhler studied church and school music in Halle and then at the Royal Music Institute of Berlin in Charlottenburg under Hans Chemin-Petit and Fritz Jöde: his organ teacher was the church musician and organist Wolfgang Reimann (1887–1971). In 1932–1933, he served as organist at the Berlin Philharmonie and spent the next year as organist at the Pauluskirche in Berlin-Lichterfelde. He was appointed in 1934 as city organist in Weimar at the Herderkirche, the church of St. Paul and Peter, with a simultaneous lecturership and then professorship at the Hochschule für Musik Franz Liszt until retirement in 1975. He died in Weimar in 1990.

Köhler joined the Nazi Party in 1937. After the Second World War, Köhler became a member of the main board of the CDU in the Soviet occupation zone and the German Democratic Republic. On his suggestion, after 1946 special "Bach Days" were organised in Weimar. To mark the 700th anniversary of the city of Weimar, on 4 August 1950 "Bach Days" were initiated in the chapel of the Ducal Schloss at Weimar for what became legendary organ concerts; in 1962, however, the chapel was requisitioned for a political book store. In 1950 Köhler was appointed as Kirchenmusikdirektor (KMD, director of church music) in the Weimar region and promoted to a professorship at the Hochschule für Musik Franz Liszt; his own personal contributions were added to the archives of the Hochschule in 2007.

Köhler combined his duties in Weimar with concert tours all over Europe and the United States, as well as radio and televisions broadcasts and vinyl recordings. With his dominating musical personality, he established an international reputation: organ masterclasses in Weimar; outstanding performances of the major organ repertoire; and also organ improvisation. From 1960 onwards, he produced recordings of the major organ works of Johann Sebastian Bach on Silbermann organs in Saxony.

== Publications ==
- Köhler, Johannes-Ernst (1974). "Die Orgelkunst – bedeutender Faktor musikalischen Erlebens". In Sekretariat des Hauptvorstandes der CDU (ed.). Bericht über die Tagung des Präsidiums des Hauptvorstandes der CDU mit Künstlern am 23 November 1973 in Burgscheidungen. Auftrag und Verantwortung des Künstlers in der entwickelten sozialistischen Gesellschaft (in German). Berlin. pp. 67–71.
