= Johann Caspar Vogler =

German organist and composer

Johann Caspar Vogler (23 May 1696 – 3 June 1763) was a German organist and composer taught by Johann Sebastian Bach.

== Biography ==
He was born in Hausen, near Arnstadt; from 1706 he studied with Johann Sebastian Bach, who was organist there between 1703 and 1707. He also taught, in Rudolstadt, by P. H. Erlebach and Nicolaus Vetter. He moved to Weimar to study further with Bach from 1710 to 1715, during which time he copied Jacques Boyvin's two livres d'orgue. He was appointed organist at Stadtilm in 1715, leaving in May 1721 to take up Bach's former post of organist to the Weimar court.

He failed in two applications in 1729 for organ posts at the Nikolaikirche, Leipzig, and Sts Peter und Paul, Görlitz, which were filled by Bach pupils Johann Schneider and David Nicolai. The Leipzig judges remarked that he 'played too fast and confused the congregation'; this did not deter him from boasting of his 'swiftness of hand and feet' in the second application.

He was selected for the post of organist of the Marktkirche in Hanover in 1735, but forbidden from leaving Weimar by Duke Ernst August, the same prohibition that Duke Wilhelm Ernst had imposed years before on Bach. Nevertheless, he became deputy mayor of Weimar as some consolation, and mayor two years later; he remained there for the rest of his life.

== Works ==
He composed a St Mark Passion which is now lost, and only three of his works, all organ chorales, are now known. His setting of Jesu Leiden, Pein und Tod, BWV Anh. 57 (modelled on O Mensch, bewein dein Sünde groß, BWV 622, in Bach's Orgelbüchlein) is one of the most elaborately decorated chorales in the whole repertoire, with the chorale melody embellished by hemidemisemiquavers and even shorter notes. He published the two other chorales as Vermischte musikalische Choral-Gedanken (Weimar, 1737; in Incognita organo XXXVI, Hilversum, 1988); they are of a similar style to Bach's 'Arnstadt' chorales with expressive, improvisational interludes to a full harmonised chorale; there are other features resembling Bach's 'Leipzig' chorales, BWV 651–668.

There are some copies of Bach's compositions in Vogler's hand; he was formerly known in the Bach literature as 'Anonymous 18' before his identity was established. The copy he made of the Prelude and Fughetta in C major, BWV 870a, is valued in performance practice studies, for its written-out fingerings.

== Sources ==
- Russell Stinson: 'Vogler, Johann Caspar', Grove Music Online ed. L. Macy (Accessed 2007-06-13), http://www.grovemusic.com/
