= Flute Sonata in A major, BWV 1032 =

Flute Sonata in A major
- BWV 1032
- by J. S. Bach
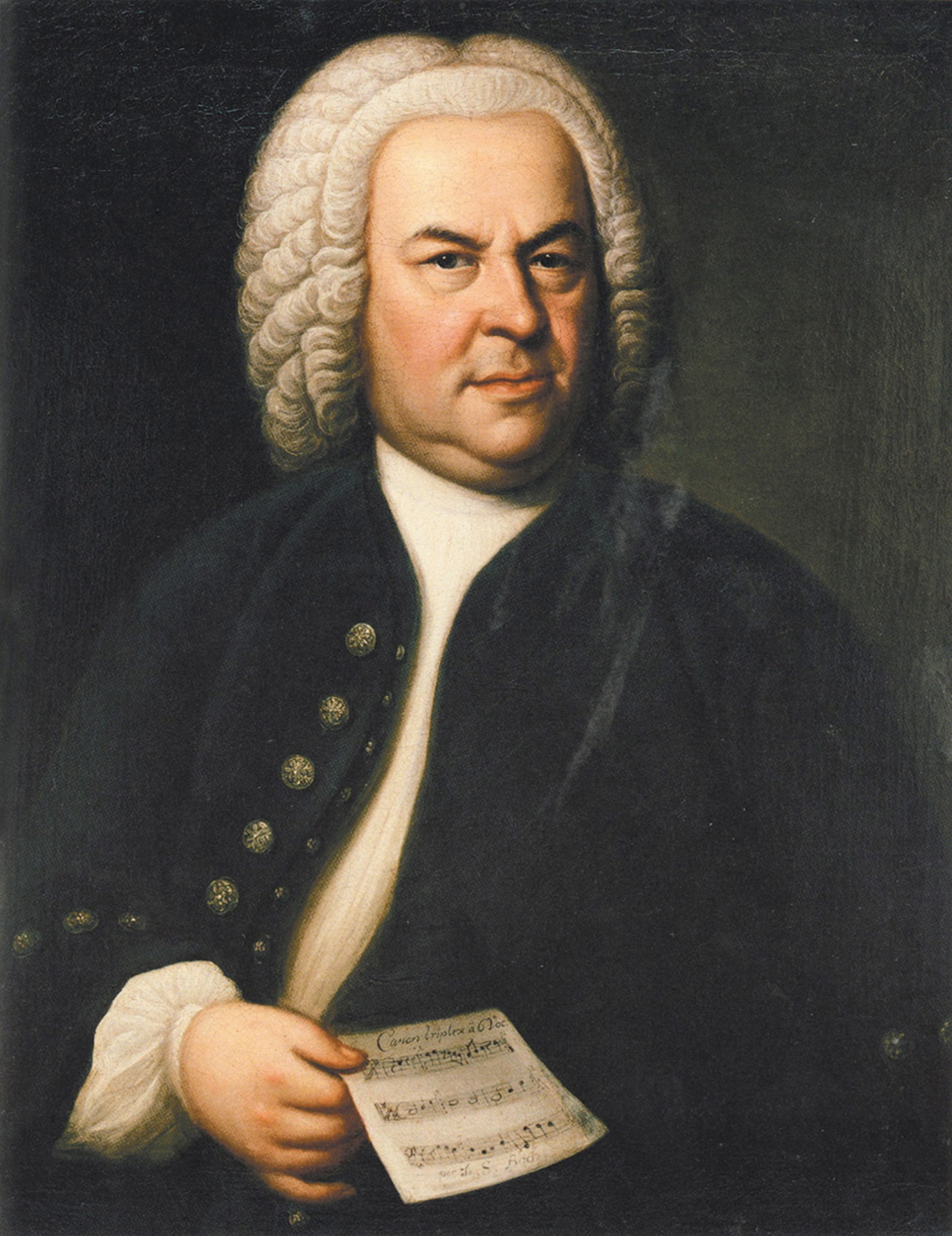
- Bach in 1746; 1748 portrait by Elias Gottlob Haussmann
- Composed: c. 1730s
- Movements: 3
- Scoring: Flute and harpsichord

The Sonata in A major for transverse flute and harpsichord by Johann Sebastian Bach (BWV 1032) is a sonata in three movements:

I. Vivace

II. Largo e Dolce

III. Allegro
Performed by Alex Murray (transverse flute) and Martha Goldstein (harpsichord)

1. Vivace,
2. Largo e dolce, 6/8 in A minor, ending with a half cadence
3. Allegro, 3/8

Unusually, the second movement is written in the parallel minor (A minor), rather than the relative minor (F♯ minor) or another closely related key.

The autograph dates to around the 1730s (debated) and is incomplete; there are 46 bars missing. Reconstructions by various authors exist.

== See also ==
- Concerto, BWV 525a (middle movement)

== Sources ==
- Swack, Jeanne (1995), "J.S. Bach's A Major Flute Sonata BWV 1032 revisited", in Melamed, Daniel R. (ed.), Bach Studies 2, Cambridge University Press, pp. 154–174

=== External links ===
- Flute Sonata in A major, BWV 1032: performance by the Netherlands Bach Society (video and background information)
- Sonatas for Flute and Clavier, BWV 1030-32: Scores at the International Music Score Library Project
