= Kirchenmusikdirektor =

Kirchenmusikdirektor (KMD, director of church music) is a German title for professional church musicians (Kirchenmusiker who have responsibility for not only a parish but a larger region, in both Protestant and Catholic church music. The title is also sometimes awarded for long-term merits for church music.

Depending on the organisation, different qualifications are required for the title. The leading church musician within a Protestant Landeskirche is usually called Landeskirchenmusikdirektor (state church music director), responsible for all church music within that region, and also for contact to church music education in a state. In Catholic dioceses, the equivalent title is Diözesankirchenmusikdirektor (DKMD).
