= BWV Anh. =

Abbreviation for contentious attributions to Bach

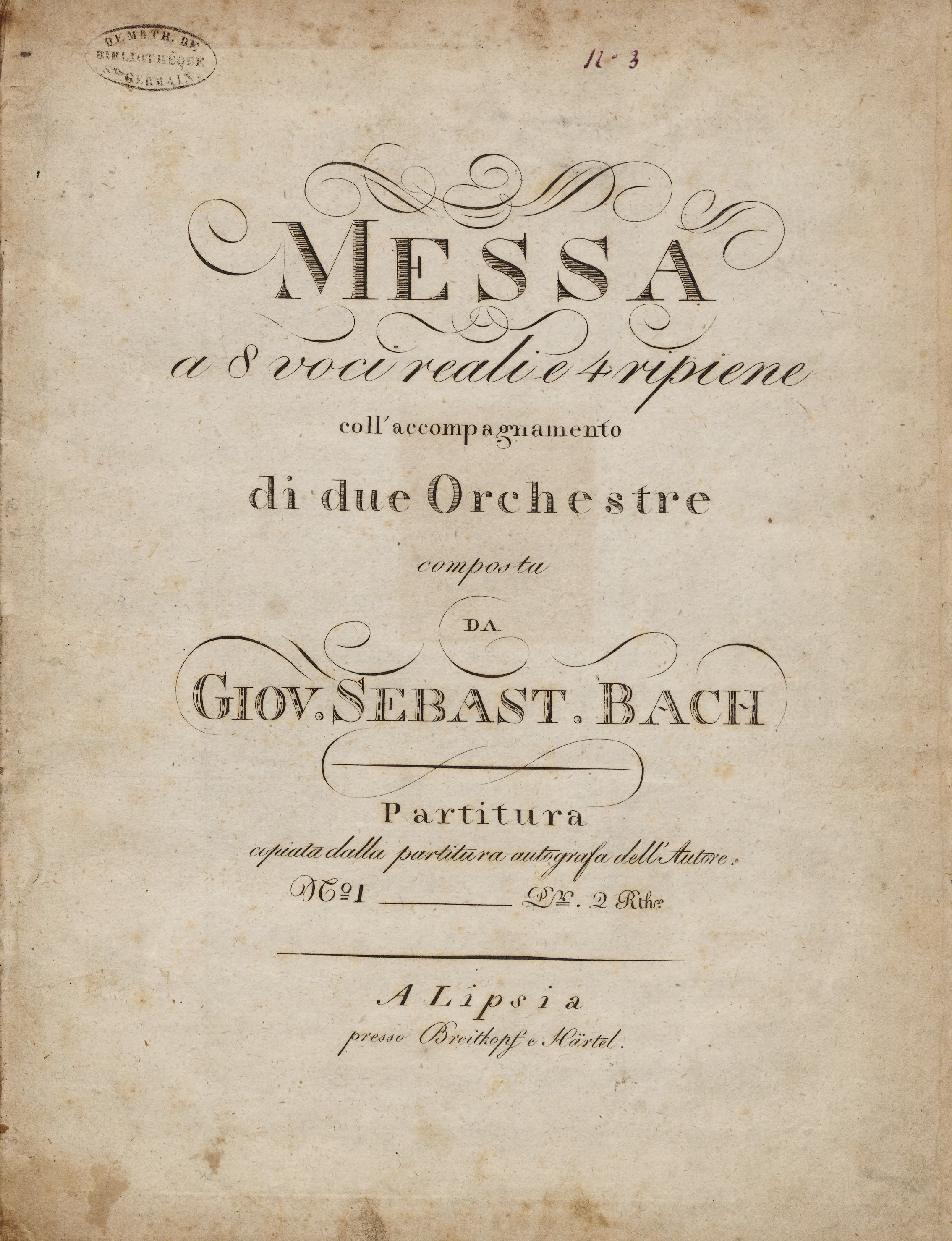
Title page of the 1805 edition of the Kyrie–Gloria Mass for double choir, BWV Anh. 167 – at that moment attributed to Johann Sebastian Bach.

The BWV Anh. (German: Bach-Werke-Verzeichnis Anhang, lit. 'Bach Works Catalogue Annex') is a list of lost, doubtful, and spurious compositions by, or once attributed to, Johann Sebastian Bach.

== History ==
=== First edition of the Bach-Werke-Verzeichnis (1950) ===
In 1950 the Bach-Werke-Verzeichnis was published, allocating a unique number to every known composition by Bach. Wolfgang Schmieder, the editor of that catalogue, grouped the compositions by genre, largely following the 19th-century Bach-Gesellschaft (BG) edition for the collation (e.g. BG cantata number = BWV number of the cantata):

1. Kantaten (Cantatas), BWV 1–224
2. Motetten (Motets), BWV 225–231
3. Messen, Messensätze, Magnificat (Masses, Mass movements, Magnificat), BWV 232–243
4. Passionen, Oratorien (Passions, Oratorios), BWV 244–249
5. Vierstimmige Choräle (Four-part chorales), BWV 250–438
6. Lieder, Arien, Quodlibet (Songs, Arias and Quodlibet), BWV 439–524
7. Werke für Orgel (Works for organ), BWV 525–771
8. Werke für Klavier (Keyboard compositions), BWV 772–994
9. Werke für Laute (Lute compositions), BWV 995–1000
10. Kammermusik (Chamber music), BWV 1001–1040
11. Orchesterwerke (Works for orchestra), BWV 1041–1071, originally in two separate chapters: Concertos (BWV 1041–1065) and Overtures (BWV 1066–1071)
12. Kanons (Canons), BWV 1072–1078
13. Musikalisches Opfer, Kunst der Fuge (Musical Offering, Art of the Fugue), BWV 1079–1080

The Anhang of the BWV listed works that were not suitable for the main catalogue, in three sections:

- I – lost works, or works of which only a tiny fraction had survived (BWV Anh. 1–23)
- II – works of dubious authenticity (BWV Anh. 24–155)
- III – works that were once attributed to Bach, but for which it had been established they were not composed by him (BWV Anh. 156–189)

Within each section of the Anhang the works are sorted by genre, following the same sequence of genres as the main catalogue.

=== Second edition of the Bach-Werke-Verzeichnis (1990 and 1998) ===
Schmieder published the BWV's second edition in 1990, with some modifications regarding authenticity discriminations, and more works added to the main catalogue and the Anhang. A strict numerical collation was abandoned to insert additions, or when for another reason compositions were regrouped. Authenticity discriminations, based on new research, could lead to such repositionings within the catalogue, e.g. "BWV Anh. II 114" became "BWV Anh. 114 / Anh. III 183→" indicating it was now considered a spurious work.

In 1998 Alfred Dürr and Yoshitake Kobayashi published a small edition of the catalogue, based on the 1990 second edition. This edition, known as BWV^{2a}, contained a few further updates and collation rearrangements.

New additions (Nachträge) to BWV^{2}/BWV^{2a} included:

- BWV 1081–1126
- BWV Anh. 190–213

A few exceptions to the principle that compositions were not renumbered were when a composition from the Anhang could be recovered and/or authenticated as Bach's, so that it deserved a place in the main catalogue, in which case it was given a number above 1080. So, for example, BWV Anh. 205 (BWV^{2}) → BWV 1121 (BWV^{2a}, where it is in section 7 as a work for organ).

Other renumberings and additional numbers involved alternative or earlier versions of basically the same composition, which were indicated by adding a lower case letter to the BWV number. For example, BWV Anh. 198 was renumbered to BWV 149/1a (earlier abandoned version of the opening movement of Cantata BWV 149)

Slashes indicate movements: e.g. BWV 149/1 indicates the first movement of the Cantata BWV 149. Another example: the Agnus Dei of the Mass in B minor can be indicated as BWV 232/22 (22nd movement of the composition), or alternatively as BWV 232^{IV}/4 (BWV 232, fourth movement of Part IV).

=== Bachs Notenbibliothek (1992) ===
Kirsten Beißwenger published Bachs Notenbibliothek (BNB) in 1992. As a compendium of works in Bach's musical library, it listed as well Bach's own compositions, as works by other composers of which Bach owned a copy. Several compositions of this latter group are listed in the BWV Anh. (mostly Anh. III). For example, the Kyrie–Gloria Mass for double choir, BWV Anh. 167, is listed as BNB I/An/3 in Beißwenger's catalogue.

=== 21st century ===
As of mid-2018 the Bach Digital website started to implement the new numbers of the next edition of the Bach-Werke-Verzeichnis. The editors of this third edition of the Bach-Werke-Verzeichnis (BWV³: officially presented to the public on June 13, 2022, during the Leipzig Bachfest) recognised that the BWV Anh. had become largely unworkable, calling for a new approach.

== List ==
=== Legend ===
Legend to the table
column		content
1	BWV	Bach-Werke-Verzeichnis (lit. 'Bach-works-catalogue'; BWV) numbers. Anhang (Annex; Anh.) numbers are indicated as follows: preceded by I: in Anh. I (lost works) of BWV^{1} (1950 first edition of the BWV); preceded by II: in Anh. II (doubtful works) of BWV^{1}; preceded by III: in Anh. III (spurious works) of BWV^{1}; preceded by N: new Anh. numbers in BWV^{2} (1990) and/or BWV^{2a} (1998)
2	^{2a}	Section in which the composition appears in BWV^{2a}: Chapters of the main catalogue indicated by Arabic numerals (1-13); Anh. sections indicated by Roman numerals (I–III); Reconstructions published in the NBE indicated by "R"
3	Date	Date associated with the completion of the listed version of the composition. Exact dates (e.g. for most cantatas) usually indicate the assumed date of first (public) performance. When the date is followed by an abbreviation in brackets (e.g. JSB for Johann Sebastian Bach) it indicates the date of that person's involvement with the composition as composer, scribe or publisher.
4	Name	Name of the composition: if the composition is known by a German incipit, that German name is preceded by the composition type (e.g. cantata, chorale prelude, motet, ...)
5	Key	Key of the composition
6	Scoring	See scoring table below for the abbreviations used in this column
7	BG	Bach Gesellschaft-Ausgabe (BG edition; BGA): numbers before the colon indicate the volume in that edition. After the colon an Arabic numeral indicates the page number where the score of the composition begins, while a Roman numeral indicates a description of the composition in the Vorwort (Preface) of the volume.
8	NBE	New Bach Edition (German: Neue Bach-Ausgabe, NBA): Roman numerals for the series, followed by a slash, and the volume number in Arabic numerals. A page number, after a colon, refers to the "Score" part of the volume. Without such page number, the composition is only described in the "Critical Commentary" part of the volume. The volumes group Bach's compositions by genre: 1. Cantatas (Vol. 1–34: church cantatas grouped by occasion; Vol. 35–40: secular cantatas; Vol. 41: Varia); 2. Masses, Passions, Oratorios (12 volumes); 3. Motets, Chorales, Lieder (4 volumes); 4. Organ Works (11 volumes); 5. Keyboard and Lute Works (14 volumes); 6. Chamber Music (5 volumes); 7. Orchestral Works (7 volumes); 8. Canons, Musical Offering, Art of Fugue (3 volumes); 9. Addenda (approximately 7 volumes)
9	Additional info	may include: "after" – indicating a model for the composition; "by" – indicating the composer of the composition (if different from Johann Sebastian Bach); "in" – indicating the oldest known source for the composition; "pasticcio" – indicating a composition with parts of different origin; "see" – composition renumbered in a later edition of the BWV; "text" – by text author, or, in source; Provenance of standard texts and tunes, such as Lutheran hymns and their chorale melodies, Latin liturgical texts (e.g. Magnificat) and common tunes (e.g. Folia), are not usually indicated in this column. For an overview of such resources used by Bach, see individual composition articles, and overviews in, e.g., Chorale cantata (Bach)#Bach's chorale cantatas, List of chorale harmonisations by Johann Sebastian Bach#Chorale harmonisations in various collections and List of organ compositions by Johann Sebastian Bach#Chorale Preludes.
10	BD	Bach Digital Work page

Legend for abbreviations in "Scoring" column
Voices (see also SATB)
a	A	b	B	s	S	t	T	v			V	
alto (solo part)	alto (choir part)	bass (solo part)	bass (choir part)	soprano (solo part)	soprano (choir part)	tenor (solo part)	tenor (choir part)	voice (includes parts for unspecified voices or instruments as in some canons)			vocal music for unspecified voice type	
Winds and battery (bold = soloist)
Bas	Bel	Cnt	Fl	Hn	Ob	Oba	Odc	Tai	Tbn	Tdt	Tmp	Tr
bassoon (can be part of Bc, see below)	bell(s) (musical bells)	cornett, cornettino	flute (traverso, flauto dolce, piccolo, flauto basso)	natural horn, corno da caccia, corno da tirarsi, lituo	oboe	oboe d'amore	oboe da caccia	taille	trombone	tromba da tirarsi	timpani	tromba (natural trumpet, clarino trumpet)
Strings and keyboard (bold = soloist)
Bc		Hc	Kb	Lu	Lw	Org	Str	Va	Vc	Vdg	Vl	Vne
basso continuo: Vdg, Hc, Vc, Bas, Org, Vne and/or Lu		harpsichord	keyboard (Hc, Lw, Org or clavichord)	lute, theorbo	Lautenwerck (lute-harpsichord)	organ (/man. = manualiter, without pedals)	strings: Vl I, Vl II and Va	viola(s), viola d'amore, violetta	violoncello, violoncello piccolo	viola da gamba	violin(s), violino piccolo	violone, violone grosso

Background colours
Colour	Meaning
green	extant or clearly documented partial or complete manuscript (copy) by Bach and/or first edition under Bach's supervision
yellow	extant or clearly documented manuscript (copy) or print edition, in whole or in part, by close relative, i.e. brother (J. Christoph), wife (A. M.), son (W. F. / C. P. E. / J. C. F. / J. Christian) or son-in-law (Altnickol)
orange-brown	extant or clearly documented manuscript (copy) by close friend and/or pupil (Kellner, Krebs, Kirnberger, Walther, ...), or distant family member

=== Table ===
Compositions listed in the Anhang of BWV^{2a}
BWV	^{2a}	Date	Name	Key	Scoring	BG	NBE	Additional info	BD
**Anh. I**	Fragments – lost works								Up ↑
I 1	I	1725-07-15?	Cantata Gesegnet ist die Zuversicht (Trinity VII)		SATB 2Fl Str Bc			by Telemann (TWV 1:617)?; text by Neumeister?	01308
I 2	I							see BWV 1137	01309
I 3	I							see BWV 1140	01310
I 4	I							see BWV 1139.1	01311
I 4a	I							see BWV 1139.2	01312
I 5	I							see BWV 1147	01313
I 6	I							see BWV 1151	01314
I 7	I							see BWV 1153	01315
I 8	I							see BWV 1152	01316
I 9	I							see BWV 1156	01317
I 10	I							see BWV 1160	01318
I 11	I							see BWV 1157	01319
I 12	I							see BWV 1158	01320
I 13	I							see BWV 1161	01321
I 14	I							see BWV 1144	01322
I 15	I							see BWV 1148	01323
I 16	I	1735-11-09	Cantata Schließt die Gruft! ihr Trauerglocken (mourning of Hedwig of Merseburg)					by Roemhildt; text by Hoffmann, B.	01324
I 17	I		Cantata Mein Gott, nimm die gerechte Seele (funeral)		SATB 2Oba Str Bas Bc		I/33		01325
I 18	I							see BWV 1162	01326
I 19	I	1734-11-21	Secular cantata Thomana saß annoch betrübt (welcome to Johann August Ernesti as new rector of St. Thomas school)				I/39	text by Landvoigt?	01327
I 20	I							see BWV 1155	01328
N 190	I	1729-04-18	Cantata Ich bin ein Pilgrim auf der Welt (Easter 2)		b Bc ...		I/33	by Bach, C. P. E.?; text by Picander	01501
N 191	I	1715-05-19	Cantata Leb ich oder leb ich nicht (Cantate)					text by Franck, S.	01502
N 192	I							see BWV 1138.1	01503
N 193	I							see BWV 1141	01504
N 194	I							see BWV 1154	01505
N 195	I	1723-06-09	Secular cantata Murmelt nur, ihr heitern Bäche (celebration of Johann Florenz Rivinus)					text in Acta Lipsiensium 1723, Vol. 5, pp. 515–619	01506
N 196	I							see BWV 1163	01507
N 197	I							see BWV 1150	01508
N 198	I							see BWV 149/1a	01509
N 199	I							see BWV 1135	01510
N 200	I	c.1740	chorale setting "O Traurigkeit, o Herzeleid" (unused sketch for Orgelbüchlein)		Organ		IV/1: 46	after Z 1915; in SBB P 283	01511
N 209	I							see BWV 1136	01520
N 210	I	1734-10-04	Cantata Wo sind meine Wunderwerke (leave-taking of Johann Matthias Gesner)					text in 2° Poet. Germ. I, 6425: 4 Rara; /1 → BWV 193a/7, 193/3?	01521
N 211	I							see BWV 1145	01522
N 212	I							see BWV 1146	01523
N 213	I		Concerto	F maj.	Org			by Telemann; arr. by Bach	01524
223	I	1717–1718?	Cantata Meine Seele soll Gott loben	B♭ maj.			I/34	by Handel?	00280
224	I	1732	Aria "Reißt euch los, bekränkte Sinnen" (fragment)		S		I/41	by Bach, C. P. E.?; in SBB P 491	00281
**Anh. II**	Works of doubtful authenticity								Up ↑
53	II		Aria "Schlage doch, gewünschte Stunde" (Funeral)	E maj.	a Bel Str Bc	12^{2}: 53	I/41	by Hoffmann, M.?	00068
142	II		Cantata Uns ist ein Kind geboren (Christmas)	A min.	atbSATB 2Fl 2Ob Str Bc	30: 19	I/41	text by Neumeister (reworked)	00174
189	II		Cantata Meine Seele rühmt und preist (German Magnificat, Visitation)	B♭ maj.	t Fl Ob Vl Bc	37: 213	I/41	by Hoffmann, M.	00229
217	II		Cantata Gedenke, Herr, wie es uns gehet (Epiphany I)		satbSATB Fl Str Bc	41: 207	I/41	by Altnickol?	00274
220	II		Cantata Lobt ihn mit Herz und Munde (24 June: feast of John the Baptist)		atbSATB Fl 2Ob Str Bc	41: 259	I/41		00277
221	II		Cantata Wer sucht die Pracht, wer wünscht den Glanz		tb 2Vl Bas Vc Org		I/41	in SBB P 191: 83–113	00278
III 159	II							see BWV 1164	01470
II 25	II	1740–1742 (JSB)	Kyrie–Gloria Mass	C maj.	SATB 2Tr 2Vl Org	11^{1}: XVI	II/9	by Bach, J. L.?	01333
239	II	1738–1741 (JSB)	Sanctus	D min.	SATB Str Bc	11^{1}: 89	II/9	after Caldara, Missa Providentiae/4	00298
II 28	II		Sanctus	B♭ maj.	SATB 2Ob 2Cor Str Bc	11^{1}: XVII	II/9		01336
II 29	II	c.1714–17	Kyrie–Gloria Mass (only cello part extant)	C min.			II/9	in BKraków St 547	01337
III 167	II	1738–1739 (JSB)	Kyrie–Gloria Mass for two choirs	G maj.	3SATB 3Ob Tai 2Vl 2Va 2Vne Bc Org		II/9	by Bernhard, Krieger or Pohle?; in SBB P 659	01478
II 30	II	1690s (Tor.) c.1742 (JSB)	Magnificat for double choir	C maj.	2SATB 3Tr Tmp 2Vl 2Vla Bc	11^{1}: XV	II/9	after Torri, Magnificat; Tr3, Tmp by Bach	01338
246	II	1732-04-11 (JSB)	Passion St Luke Passion		ssatbSATB 2Fl 2Ob Tai Bas Str Bc	45^{2}	II/9: 65	→ BWV 246/40a; in SBB P 1017	00311
II 31	II		chorale setting "Herr Gott, dich loben alle wir"		SATB 2Tr 3Ob Str Bc			in SBB P 101	01339
N 201	II		chorale setting "Du Friedefürst, Herr Jesu Christ"		SATB			by Vetter, D.	01512
N 202	II		chorale setting "Gott hat das Evangelium"		SATB			by Vetter, D.	01513
N 203	II		chorale setting "Ich hebe meine Augen auf"		SATB			by Vetter, D.	01514
N 204	II		chorale setting "O Traurigkeit, o Herzeleid"		SATB			by Vetter, D.	01515
II 32	II	1704	Sieben geistliche Oden und ein Gedicht No. 1 "Getrost mein Geist, wenn Wind und Wetter krachen"		Voice Bc			in Deutsche Übersetzungen und Gedichte	01340
II 33	II	1704	Sieben geistliche Oden und ein Gedicht No. 2 "Mein Jesus, spare nicht"		Voice Bc			in Deutsche Übersetzungen und Gedichte	01341
II 34	II	1704	Sieben geistliche Oden und ein Gedicht No. 3 "Kann ich mit einem Tone"		Voice Bc			in Deutsche Übersetzungen und Gedichte	01342
II 35	II	1704	Sieben geistliche Oden und ein Gedicht No. 4 "Meine Seele lass die Flügel"		Voice Bc			in Deutsche Übersetzungen und Gedichte	01343
II 36	II	1704	Sieben geistliche Oden und ein Gedicht No. 5 "Ich stimm' itzund ein Straff-Lied an"		Voice Bc			in Deutsche Übersetzungen und Gedichte	01344
II 37	II	1704	Sieben geistliche Oden und ein Gedicht No. 6 "Der schwarze Flügel trüber Nacht"		Voice Bc			in Deutsche Übersetzungen und Gedichte	01345
II 38	II	1704	Sieben geistliche Oden und ein Gedicht No. 7 "Das Finsterniß tritt ein"		Voice Bc			in Deutsche Übersetzungen und Gedichte	01346
II 39	II	1704	Sieben geistliche Oden und ein Gedicht No. 8 "Ach was wollt ihr trüben Sinnen"		Voice Bc			in Deutsche Übersetzungen und Gedichte	01347
II 40	II	1736	Song "Ich bin nun wie ich bin"		Voice Kb			in Singende Muse an der Pleiße	01348
II 41	II	1736	Song "Dir zu Liebe, wertes Herze"		Voice Kb			in Singende Muse an der Pleiße	01349
571	II	c. 1704	Fantasia, a.k.a. Concerto	G maj.	Organ	38: 67	IV/11: 35		00651
580	II		Fugue	D maj.	Organ	38: 215			00662
II 42	II		Fugue	F maj.	Organ			in SBB P 817: 1–3	01350
576	II		Fugue	G maj.	Organ	38: 106	IV/11		00658
577	II		Fugue	G maj.	Organ	38: 111	IV/11: 44		00659
581	II		Fugue	G maj.	Organ		IV/11	by Homilius?	00663
131a	II		Fugue	G min.	Organ	38: 217	IV/11: 3	after BWV 131/5	00161
534	II		Prelude and Fugue	F min.	Organ	15: 104	IV/5: 130	by Bach, W. F.?	00608
536a	II	c.1760–1789?	Prelude and Fugue	A maj.	Organ		IV/6: 114	after BWV 536, 152/1; arr. by Scholz?	00612
545b	II	1708–1717	Prelude, Trio and Fugue	B♭ maj.	Organ		IV/11: 6	after BWV 545a; ↔ 545, 1029/3	00624
553	II		Eight Short Preludes and Fugues No. 1	C maj.	Organ	38: 23	IV/11	by Krebs, J. T. or J. L.?	00633
554	II		Eight Short Preludes and Fugues No. 2	D min.	Organ	38: 27	IV/11	by Krebs, J. T. or J. L.?	00634
555	II		Eight Short Preludes and Fugues No. 3	E min.	Organ	38: 30	IV/11	by Krebs, J. T. or J. L.?	00635
556	II		Eight Short Preludes and Fugues No. 4	F maj.	Organ	38: 33	IV/11	by Krebs, J. T. or J. L.?	00636
557	II		Eight Short Preludes and Fugues No. 5	G maj.	Organ	38: 36	IV/11	by Krebs, J. T. or J. L.?	00637
558	II		Eight Short Preludes and Fugues No. 6	G min.	Organ	38: 39	IV/11	by Krebs, J. T. or J. L.?	00638
559	II		Eight Short Preludes and Fugues No. 7	A min.	Organ	38: 42	IV/11	by Krebs, J. T. or J. L.?	00639
560	II		Eight Short Preludes and Fugues No. 8	B♭ maj.	Organ	38: 45	IV/11	by Krebs, J. T. or J. L.?	00640
561	II		Fantasia and Fugue	A min.	Organ	38: 48			00641
568	II		Prelude	G maj.	Organ	38: 85	IV/6: 51		00648
584	II		Trio	G min.	Organ		I/12: 23; IV/11	after BWV 166/2	00666
1027 /1a /2a /4a	II		Trio	G maj.	Organ		IV/11	after BWV 1027/1–2 /4, 1039/1–2 /4; arr. by Kellner, J. P.?	01209
591	II		Kleines harmonisches Labyrinth		Organ	38: 225	IV/11: 50	by Heinichen?	00673
597	II		Concerto for solo organ	E♭ maj.	Organ		IV/11	after lost model?	00680
598	II		Pedal-Exercitium (fragment)		Organ	38: 210		by Bach, C. P. E.?	00681
676a	II	1739–1789	chorale setting "Allein Gott in der Höh sei Ehr" (later variant)		Organ	40: 208	IV/4: KB 48	after BWV 676	00792
683a	II	1739–1789	chorale setting "Vater unser im Himmelreich" (later variant)		Organ		IV/4: KB 51	after BWV 683	00800
N 205	II							see BWV 1121	01516
II 48	II		chorale setting "Allein Gott in der Höh sei Ehr"		Organ			by Walther (& Scholz?)	01356
II 49	II		chorale setting "Ein feste Burg ist unser Gott"		Organ			by Walther?	01357
II 50	II		chorale setting "Erhalt uns, Herr, hei deinem Wort"		Organ				01358
II 51	II		chorale setting "Erstanden ist der heilge Christ"		Organ				01359
II 52	II		chorale setting "Freu dich sehr, o meine Seele"		Organ				01360
II 53	II		chorale setting "Freu dich sehr, o meine Seele"		Organ				01361
II 54	II		chorale setting "Helft mir Gotts Güte preisen"		Organ				01362
II 54	II		chorale setting "Von Gott will ich nicht lassen"		Organ				01362
II 55	II	1714-1717 or earlier	chorale setting "Herr Christ, der einig Gottes Sohn"		Organ				01363
II 58	II		chorale setting "Jesu, meine Freude"		Organ				01366
II 59	II		chorale setting "Jesu, meine Freude"		Organ				01367
II 60	II		chorale setting "Nun lob, mein Seel, den Herren"		Organ			by Walther?	01368
II 62a	II		chorale setting "Sei Lob und Ehr mit hohem Preis"		Organ				01370
II 62b	II		chorale setting "Sei Lob und Ehr mit hohem Preis"		Organ				01371
II 63	II		chorale setting "Vom Himmel hoch"		Organ				01372
II 64	II		chorale setting "Vom Himmel hoch"		Organ				01373
II 65	II		chorale setting "Vom Himmel hoch"		Organ				01374
II 66	II		chorale setting "Wachet auf, ruft uns"		Organ Tr			by Krebs, J. L.?	01375
II 67	II		chorale setting "Was Gott tut, das ist wohlgetan"		Organ				01376
II 68	II		chorale setting "Wer nur den lieben Gott läßt walten"		Organ				01377
II 69	II		chorale setting "Wir glauben all an einen Gott"		Organ				01378
II 70	II		chorale setting "Wir glauben all an einen Gott"		Organ				01379
II 71	II							see BWV 1128	01725
II 72	II		chorale setting "Christus der uns selig macht" (Canon)		Organ				01381
II 74	II		chorale setting "Schmücke dich, o liebe Seele"		Organ				01383
II 75	II		chorale setting "Herr Christ, der einig Gottes Sohn"		Organ				01384
II 76	II		chorale setting "Jesu, meine Freude"		Organ				01385
II 77	II		chorale setting "Herr Christ, der einig Gottes Sohn"		Organ				01386
II 78	II		chorale setting "Wenn wir in höchsten Nöten sein"		Organ				01387
II 79	II		chorale setting "Befiehl du deine Wege"		Organ				01388
691a	II	1720–1789	chorale setting "Wer nur den lieben Gott läßt walten" (variant)		Organ	40: 151		after BWV 691	00809
705	II		chorale setting "Durch Adams Fall ist ganz verderbt" (Kirnb. coll. No. 16)		Organ	40: 23	IV/10: 47	after Z 7549	00825
708	II	1700–1789	chorale setting "Ich hab mein Sach Gott heimgestellt" (alio modo; Kirnb. coll. No. 19)		Organ	40: 30	IV/10: 86	after Z 1679	00828
708a	II	1700–1789	chorale setting "Ich hab mein Sach Gott heimgestellt"		Organ	40: 152	IV/10: 86	after Z 1679	00829
716	II		chorale setting "Allein Gott in der Höh sei Ehr" (Fantasia)		Organ	40: 45	IV/10: 14	after Z 4457	00838
726	II	bef. c.1727	chorale setting "Herr Jesu Christ, dich zu uns wend"		Organ	40: 72	IV/3: 45	after Z 624	00849
743	II	bef. c.1740	chorale setting "Ach, was ist doch unser Leben"		Organ		IV/10: 11	after Z 1208b; by Buttstett, J. H.?	00871
745	II	1700–1788	chorale setting "Aus der Tiefe rufe ich"		Organ	40: 171	IV/10: 22	after Z 1217; by Bach, C. P. E.?	00873
749	II	c.1700–1717	chorale setting "Herr Jesu Christ, dich zu uns wend"		Organ		IV/10: 80	after Z 624; by Bach, J. Christoph or Telemann?	00878
750	II	c.1700–1703	chorale setting "Herr Jesu Christ, meins Lebens Licht"		Organ		IV/10: 81		00879
752	II	c.1700–1717	chorale setting "Jesu, der du meine Seele"		Organ			after Z 6779a	00881
754	II	bef. c.1740	chorale setting "Liebster Jesu, wir sind hier"		Organ			after Z 3498b	00883
755	II		chorale setting "Nun freut euch, lieben Christen g'mein"		Organ			after Z 4429a	00884
756	II		chorale setting "Nun ruhen alle Wälder"		Organ			after Z 2293b	00885
757	II		chorale setting "O Herre Gott, dein göttlichs Wort"		Organ			after Z 5690	00886
758	II		chorale setting "O Vater, allmächtiger Gott"		Organ	40: 179	IV/11: 69	after Z 8603b	00887
762	II	bef. c.1717	chorale setting "Vater unser im Himmelreich"		Organ		IV/10: 142	after Z 2561	00891
763	II		chorale setting "Wie schön leucht uns der Morgenstern"		Organ			after Z 8359	00892
765	II	bef. c.1717	chorale setting "Wir glauben all an einen Gott"		Organ	40: 187		after Z 7971	00894
N 206	II		chorale setting "Ach bleib mit deiner Gnade"		Organ			by Pachelbel (P 376)	01517
N 206	II		chorale setting "Christus, der ist mein Leben"		Organ			by Pachelbel (P 376)	01517
II 80	II	1707–1708 or earlier	Suite	F maj.	Keyboard		V/12		01389
821	II		Suite	B♭ maj.	Keyboard	42: 213	V/12: 3		00959
834	II		Allemande	C min.	Keyboard	42: 259	V/12		00973
839	II	1735-03-07 or earlier	Sarabande	G min.	Keyboard		V/12	in Notenbuch der Zeumerin	00978
844	II		Toccatina No. 4 Scherzo	D min.	Keyboard	42: 220	V/12: 16	by Bach, W. F.? ↔ BWV 844a	00983
844a	II		Scherzo	E min.	Keyboard	42: 281	V/12: 22	by Bach, W. F.? (BR A55); ↔ BWV 844	00984
845	II		Gigue	F min.	Keyboard	42: 263	V/12		00985
II 81	II		Gigue (incomplete)	D min.	Keyboard		V/12	by Kellner, J. P.?	01390
II 82	II		Ciacona	B♭ maj.	Keyboard		V/12	by Bach, J. B.?	01391
II 83	II		Ciacona	A maj.	Keyboard		V/12	by Bach, J. B. or H.?	01392
II 84	II		Ciacona	G maj.	Keyboard		V/12	by Bach, J. B.?	01393
II 85	II		Toccata and Fugue	F min.	Keyboard	42: XXXV	V/12: 114, 122	by Dobenecker?	01394
898	II		Prelude and Fugue on B-A-C-H	B♭ maj.	Keyboard	42: XXXIV	V/12		01067
II 86	II		Fantasia	C min.	Keyboard	42: 243	V/12	by Gronau?	01395
II 87	II		Fantasia	C maj.	Keyboard		V/12	by Benda?	01396
905	II		Fantasia and Fugue	D min.	Keyboard	42: 179	V/12: 24		01076
907	II		Fantasia and Fughetta	B♭ maj.	Keyboard	42: 268	V/12: 28	by Kirchhoff?	01078
908	II		Fantasia and Fughetta	D maj.	Keyboard	42: 272	V/12: 34	by Kirchhoff?	01079
909	II		Concerto e Fuga	C min.	Keyboard	42: 190	V/12: 38		01080
919	II		Fantasia	C min.	Keyboard	36: 152	V/12: 48	by Bach, J. B. or J. B. the Younger?	01092
920	II		Fantasia	G min.	Keyboard	42: 183	V/12		01093
923a	II		Toccatina No. 3 Prelude	A min.	Keyboard	42: 279	V/12: 14	after BWV 923	01097
II 89	II		Fugue	C maj.	Keyboard	42: XXXIV	V/12		01398
II 90	II		Fugue	C maj.	Kb (with ped?)	38: 213	IV/11: 58, 61	by Bach, C. P. E. (H 388) or Pachelbel?	01399
II 91	II		Fugue	G maj.	Keyboard	42: XXXIV	V/12		01401
II 92	II		Fugue	G maj.	Keyboard		V/12		01402
II 93	II		Fugue	E min.	Keyboard	42: XXXIV	V/12		01403
II 95	II		Fugue	E min.	Keyboard	42: XXXIV	V/12		01405
II 96	II		Fugue	D maj.	Keyboard		V/12	by Bach, C. P. E.? (H 373.5)	01406
II 98	II		Fugue	D min.	Keyboard		V/12	by Bach, C. P. E.? (H 373.5)	01408
II 99	II		Fugue	D min.	Keyboard		V/12		01409
II 100	II		Fugue	D min.	Keyboard		V/12	by Bach, C. P. E.? (H 373.5)	01410
II 101	II		Fugue	G min.	Keyboard	42: XXXV	V/12: 130	by Dobenecker?	01411
II 102	II		Fugue	E♭ min.	Keyboard		V/12		01412
897/2	II		Fugue	A min.	Keyboard	42: 175	V/12	by Dretzel or Bach, W. F.?	01066
945	II		Fugue	E min.	Keyboard	36: 155	V/12	by Graupner?	01120
956	II		Fugue	E min.	Keyboard	42: 200	V/12: 70		01133
958	II		Fugue	A min.	Keyboard	42: 205	V/12: 74		01135
960	II		Fugue (incomplete)	E min.	Keyboard	42: 276	V/12		01137
N 207	II		Fugue	E min.	Keyboard		IV/11	by Seger?	01518
II 109	II		Fugue on B-A-C-H	G min.	Keyboard		V/12		01419
964	II		Sonata	D min.	Keyboard	42: 3	V/12: 78	after BWV 1003	01141
II 111	II		Largo and Allegro	G maj.	Keyboard	42: XXXV	V/12		01421
968	II		Adagio	G maj.	Keyboard	42: 27	V/12: 94	after BWV 1005/1	01145
969	II		Toccatina No. 5 Andante	G min.	Keyboard	42: 218	V/12: 18		01146
II 113	II	1725 (AMB)	Notebook A. M. Bach (1725) No. 3 Minuet	F maj.	Keyboard	43^{2}: 25	V/4: 82		01423
II 116	II	1725 (AMB)	Notebook A. M. Bach (1725) No. 7 Minuet	G maj.	Keyboard	43^{2}: 28	V/4: 87		01426
II 117	II	1725 (AMB)	Notebook A. M. Bach (1725) No. 8a and 8b two Polonaises	F maj.	Keyboard	43^{2}: 28	V/4: 88		01427; 01428
II 118	II	1725 (AMB)	Notebook A. M. Bach (1725) No. 9 Minuet	B♭ maj.	Keyboard	43^{2}: 29	V/4: 89		01429
II 119	II	1725 (AMB)	Notebook A. M. Bach (1725) No. 10 Polonaise	G min.	Keyboard	43^{2}: 30	V/4: 90		01430
II 120	II	1725 (AMB)	Notebook A. M. Bach (1725) No. 14 Minuet	A min.	Keyboard	43^{2}: 31	V/4: 92		01431
II 121	II	1725 (AMB)	Notebook A. M. Bach (1725) No. 15 Minuet	C min.	Keyboard	43^{2}: 32	V/4: 92		01432
II 126	II	1725 (AMB)	Notebook A. M. Bach (1725) No. 22 Musette	D maj.	Keyboard	43^{2}: 35	V/4: 99		01437
II 127	II	1725 (AMB)	Notebook A. M. Bach (1725) No. 23 March	E♭ maj.	Keyboard	43^{2}: 35	V/4: 100	by Bach, C. P. E.	01438
II 128	II	1725 (AMB)	Notebook A. M. Bach (1725) No. 24 (Polonaise)	D min.	Keyboard	43^{2}: 36	V/4: 101		01439
II 132	II	1725 (AMB)	Notebook A. M. Bach (1725) No. 36 Minuet	D min.	Keyboard	43^{2}: 48	V/4: 125		01443
II 151	II		Concerto	C maj.	Keyboard	42: XXXIV	V/12		01462
II 152	II		Concerto	G maj.	Vl Hc	42: XXXIV	VI/5		01463
990	II		Sarabanda con Partitis	C maj.	Keyboard	42: 221	V/12: 97		01168
II 153	II		Sonata	A maj.	Vl Bc		VI/5		01464
II 154	II		Sonata	E♭ maj.	Vl Hc		VI/5		01465
1020	II		Sonata	G min.	Vl Hc	9: 274	VI/5	by Bach, C. P. E.? (H 542.5)	01201
1022	II		Sonata	F maj.	Vl Hc		VI/5: 27	by Bach, C. P. E.?; after BWV 1021; ↔ BWV 1038	01203
1024	II		Sonata	C min.	Vl Bc		VI/5		01205
1031	II		Sonata	E♭ maj.	Fl Hc	9: 22	VI/5: 13	by Bach, C. P. E.? (H 545)	01213
1033	II		Sonata	C maj.	Fl Bc	43^{1}: 3	VI/5: 3	by Bach, C. P. E.? (H 564.5)	01215
1038	II	1732–1735	Sonata	G maj.	Fl Vl Bc	9: 219	VI/5: 45	by Bach, C. P. E.? (H 590.5); after BWV 1021; ↔ BWV 1022	01220
525a	II		Concerto (Trio sonata)	C maj.	Vl Vc Bc		VI/5	after BWV 525/1, 1032/2, 525/3	01718
II 155	II		Concerto	A maj.	**Kb** Str Bc		VI/5		01466
I 22	II		Concerto	B♭ maj.	**Ob** **Vl** Str Bc		VI/5	by Förster (C.?)?	01330
1070	II		Orchestral Suite (No. 5)	G min.	Str Bc	45^{1}: 190	VI/5	by Bach, W. F.?	01256
**Anh. III**	Works of other composers, spuriously attributed to Bach								Up ↑
III 156	III		Cantata Herr Christ, der einge Gottes Sohn (Annunciation)		SATB Str Bc			by Telemann (TWV 1:732)	01467
III 157	III		Cantata Ich habe Lust zu scheiden (Purification)		s 2Fl Str Bc			by Telemann (TWV 1:836)	01468
15	III	1726-04-21 (JSB)	Cantata Denn du wirst meine Seele nicht in der Hölle lassen (Easter)		satbSATB 3Tr Tmp Str Bc	2: 135	I/41	by Bach, J. L. (JLB 21); text in Meiningen 1704	00017
141	III		Cantata Das ist je gewißlich wahr (3rd Sunday of Advent)		atbSATB 2Ob Str Bc	30: 3	I/41	by Telemann (TWV 1:183)	00173
145/b	III		Cantata movement So du mit deinem Munde bekennest Jesum (Easter)	D maj.	SATB Tr Str Bc	30: 96	I/10: 142	by Telemann (TWV 1:1350/1)	00178
160	III	1725–1732?	Cantata Ich weiß, daß mein Erlöser lebt (Easter)	C maj.	t Vl Bas Bc	32: 171	I/41	by Telemann (TWV 1:877)	00194
218	III		Cantata Gott der Hoffnung erfülle euch (Pentecost)		satbSATB 2Hn Str Bc	41: 223		by Telemann (TWV 1:634)	00275
219	III		Cantata Siehe, es hat überwunden der Löwe (Michaelmas)		sabSATB Str Bc	41: 239		by Telemann (TWV 1:1328)	00276
222	III		Cantata Mein Odem ist schwach (Purification)		sabSATB Str Bc			by Bach, J. Ernst; → BWV Anh. 165	00279
III 158	III		Aria "Andrò dall'colle al Prato"		s 2Fl (2Hn) Str Bc			by Bach, J. C.	03022
III 160	III	1750–1755? (Harrer?)	Motet Jauchzet dem Herrn alle Welt, TWV 8:10	C maj.	2SATB		III/3: 15	after Telemann (/1; /3 after TWV 1:1066), BWV 28/2 (/2 = BWV 28/2a); text after Psalm 100	01471
III 161	III		Motet Kündlich groß ist das gottselige Geheimnis/1 (Christmas)	D maj.	SATB Str? Bc		III/3	by Graun (C. H.?), precedes laudes A and B of BWV 243a	01472
III 162	III		Motet Lob und Ehre und Weisheit und Dank		2SATB		III/3	by Wagner, G. G.	01473
III 163	III		Motet Merk auf, mein Herz, und sieh dorthin		2SATB		III/3	by Bach, J. B. or J. Ernst	01474
III 164	III		Motet Nun danket alle Gott		SSATB		III/3: 52	by Altnickol	01475
III 165	III		Motet Unser Wandel ist im Himmel		SATB		III/3	by Bach, J. Ernst; after BWV 222/3 /4 /6	01476
III 166	III	1716 (JLB); 1729 (JSB)	Kyrie–Gloria Mass Missa sopra cantilena "Allein Gott in der Höh' sei Ehr"	E min.	SSATB 2Vl 2Vla Vc Bc	11^{1}: XV; 41: 276	II/9	by Bach, J. L. (JLB 38), start of Gloria arr. by Bach	01477
II 24	III	1715–1717, 1724 (JSB)	Kyrie–Gloria Mass	A min.	SATB Str Bc	11^{1}: XV	II/9	after Missa Sancti Lamberti by Pez, J. C.	01332
II 26	III	1727–1732 (JSB)	Kyrie–Gloria Mass	C min.	satbSATB 3Tbn 2Vl Bc	41: 193; 11^{1}: XVI	II/2: 295	by Durante (alternative Christe: BWV 242)	01334
II 27	III	c. 1745? (JLK)	Sanctus	F maj.	SATB 2Hn 2Ob Str Bc	11^{1}: XVII	II/9	by Krebs, J. L. (Krebs‑WV 104)	01335
III 168	III	c. 1747? (WFB)	Kyrie and German Gloria	G min.	sSATB Str Bc	11^{1}: XVII	II/9	by Bach, W. F. (BR E1 F 100)	01479
I 21	III	c. 1707 (MH)	Magnificat Meine Seel erhebt den Herren	A min.	s Fl 2Vl Bc	11^{1}: XVIII	II/9	by Hoffmann, M.	01329
III 169	III	1724–1725	Passion Erbauliche Gedanken auf den Grünen Donnerstag und Charfreitag über den Leidenden Jesum					text by Picander partly used in BWV 244 but no other known setting	01480
8/6	III	1713 (Vet.); 1724-09-24 (JSB)	chorale setting "Liebster Gott, wenn werd ich sterben" (s. 5)	E maj.	SATB	1: 241	I/23: 161	by Vetter, D. (Z 6634); text by Neumann	00009
8/6	III	1713 (Vet.); 1724-09-24 (JSB)	chorale setting "Liebster Gott, wenn werd ich sterben" (s. 5)	E maj.	SATB	1: 241	III/2.1: 63; III/2.2: 25	by Vetter, D. (Z 6634); text by Neumann	11228
8/6	III	1713 (Vet.); 1724-09-24 (JSB)	chorale setting "Liebster Gott, wenn werd ich sterben" (s. 5)	D maj.	SATB		I/23: 219	by Vetter, D. (Z 6634); text by Neumann	00010
27/6	III	1652 (Ros.); 1726-10-06 (JSB)	chorale setting "Welt, ade, ich bin dein müde" (s. 1)	B♭ maj.	SSATB	5^{1}: 244	I/23: 251	by Rosenmüller (Z 6531); text by Albinus	01481
III 170	III	1652 (Ros.); 1726-10-06 (JSB)	chorale setting "Welt, ade, ich bin dein müde" (s. 1)	B♭ maj.	SSATB	5^{1}: 244	III/2.2: 86	by Rosenmüller (Z 6531); text by Albinus	11345
43/11	III	1652 (Pet.); 1726-05-30 (JSB)	chorale setting "Du lebensfürst, Herr Jesu Christ" (ss. 1, 13)	G maj.	SATB	10: 126	I/12: 164	by Peter after Z 5741b; text by Rist	11241
43/11	III	1652 (Pet.); 1726-05-30 (JSB)	chorale setting "Ermuntre dich, mein schwacher Geist"	G maj.	SATB	10: 126	III/2.1: 74; III/2.2: 57	by Peter after Z 5741b; text by Rist	11241
567	III		Prelude	C maj.	Organ	38: 84	IV/11	by Krebs, J. L. (Krebs‑WV 401)	00647
III 178	III	last third of 17th century	Toccata quasi Fantasia con Fuge	A maj.	Organ	42: 250	V/12	by Reincken?	01489
II 43	III	c. 1788	Fugue	B min.	Organ		IV/11	by Pölitz; after H 776/18	01351
II 44	III		Fugue	G maj.	Organ		IV/11	by Kellner, J. P. or J. C.	01352
II 45	III	c. 1799	Fugue on B-A-C-H	B♭ maj.	Organ		IV/11	by Knecht	01353
II 88	III	1765	Fugue	C maj.	Keyboard		V/12	by Kellner, J. C.	01397
II 97	III		Fugue	F♯ maj.	Keyboard	42: XXXV	IV/11: 63	by Krebs, J. L. (Krebs‑WV 409/2)	01407
II 103	III	c. 1711–1718 (GFH)	Fugue	A min.	Keyboard		V/12	by Handel (HWV 609)	01413
II 104	III	c. 1711–1718 (GFH)	Fugue	C min.	Keyboard		V/12	by Handel (HWV 610)	01414
II 105	III	c. 1711–1718 (GFH)	Fugue	B♭ maj.	Keyboard		V/12	by Handel (HWV 607)	01415
II 106	III	c. 1711–1718 (GFH)	Fugue	G min.	Keyboard		V/12	by Handel (HWV 605)	01416
N 208	III	1747 (JEE)	Fugue	E♭ min.	Keyboard		IV/11	After Toccata nona by Eberlin	01519
II 46	III		Trio	C min.	Organ		IV/11	by Krebs, J. T.	01354
692	III		chorale setting "Ach Gott und Herr" (Kirnb. coll. No. 3)	C maj.	Organ	40: 4	IV/11	by Walther; after BWV 692a	00810
692a	III		chorale setting "Ach Gott und Herr" (early version)	C maj.	Organ	40: 152	IV/11	by Walther; → BWV 692	00811
693	III		chorale setting "Ach Gott und Herr" (Kirnb. coll. No. 4)	C maj.	Organ	40: 5	IV/11	by Walther	00812
723	III		chorale setting "Gelobet seist du, Jesu Christ" (also in Neumeister Collection)		Organ	40: 63		after Z 1947; by Bach, J. Michael	00846
740	III		chorale setting "Wir glauben all an einen Gott"		Organ	40: 103		after Z 4000; by Krebs, J. L. (Krebs‑WV 554c)	00868
744	III		chorale setting "Auf meinen lieben Gott"		Organ	40: 170	IV/10: 20	after Z 2164; by Krebs, J. L. (Krebs‑WV 517)	00872
746	III	1715 or earlier (JCFF)	chorale setting "Christ ist erstanden"	D min.	Organ	40: 173	IV/10	by Fischer (Ariadne Musica No. 24)	00874
748	III	1700–1739	chorale setting "Gott der Vater wohn uns bei"	D maj.	Organ	40: 177	IV/10	by Walther; → BWV 748a	00876
748a	III	1700–1789	chorale setting "Gott der Vater wohn uns bei" (variant)	D maj.	Organ		IV/10	by Scholz (arr.)?; after BWV 748	00877
751	III		chorale setting "In dulci jubilo" (also in Neumeister Collection)		Organ		IV/10	by Bach, J. Michael	00880
759	III		chorale setting "Schmücke dich, o liebe Seele"	F maj.	Organ	40: 181	IV/10	by Homilius (HoWV VIII.17)	00888
760	III		chorale setting "Vater unser im Himmelreich"		Organ	40: 183	IV/10	by Böhm	00889
761	III		chorale setting "Vater unser im Himmelreich"		Organ	40: 184	IV/10	by Böhm	00890
1096	III		chorale setting "Christe, der du bist Tag und Licht" (3 versions; Neumeister Chorales No. 8)	A min.	Organ		IV/9: 16, 76	by Pachelbel?	01282
1096	III		chorale setting "Wir danken dir, Herr Jesu Christ" (3 versions; Neumeister Chorales No. 8)	A min.	Organ		IV/9: 16, 76	by Pachelbel?	01282
771	III		chorale setting "Allein Gott in der Höh sei Ehr"	G maj.	Organ	40: 195	IV/11	by Vetter, A. N.	00901
II 47	III		chorale setting "Herzlich tut mich verlangen"	A min.	Organ		IV/10	by Kellner, J. P.	01355
II 47	III		chorale setting "Ach Herr, mich armen Sünder"	A min.	Organ		IV/10	by Kellner, J. P.	01355
II 56	III	1735 (Telem.)	chorale setting "Herr Jesu Christ dich zu uns wend"		Organ		IV/10	by Telemann (TWV 31:8)	01364
II 57	III		chorale setting "Jesu Leiden, Pein und Tod"		Organ		IV/10	by Vogler	01365
II 61	III		chorale setting "O Mensch, bewein dein Sünde groß"	F maj.	Organ		IV/10	by Pachelbel (P 396)	01369
II 73	III	1720–1788	chorale setting "Ich ruf zu dir, Herr Jesu Christ"	F min.	Organ		IV/10	by Bach, C. P. E.; after BWV 639	01382
III 171	III		chorale setting "Christ lag in Todesbanden"		Organ	40: 174	IV/10	by Pachelbel (P 58)	01482
III 172	III		chorale setting "Herr Jesu Christ, dich zu uns wend"	G maj.	Organ		IV/10	by Krebs, J. L. (Krebs‑WV 524)	01483
824	III	1720 (WFB)	Klavierbüchlein WFB No. 47: Suite	A maj.	Keyboard	36: 231	V/5: 78	by Telemann (TWV 32:14)	00962
835	III	1761 (Kirnb.)	Allemande	A min.	Keyboard	42: 267	V/12	by Kirnberger (EngK 74)	00974
838	III		Allemande and Courante	A maj.	Keyboard	42: 265	V/12	by Graupner (GWV 849/2 /3)	00977
840	III		Courante	G maj.	Keyboard		V/12	by Telemann (TWV 32:13/2)	00979
897/1	III	c. 1736–1743 (CHD)	Prelude	A min.	Keyboard	42: 173	V/12	by Dretzel ("Adagiosissimo")	01065
962	III	c. 1783 (JGA)	Fugue	E min.	Keyboard	42: 198	V/12	by Albrechtsberger (Op. 1/8)	01139
970	III		Toccatina No. 6 Presto	D min.	Keyboard	42: XXXIV	V/12	by Bach, W. F. (BR A49 F 25/2)	11148
II 94	III	1774 (Kirnb.)	Fugue	E min.	Keyboard	42: XXXIV	V/12	by Kirnberger (EngK 35)	01404
II 107	III		Fugue on B-A-C-H	C maj.	Keyboard	42: XXXIV	V/12	by Sorge?	01417
II 108	III		Fugue on B-A-C-H	C maj.	Keyboard	42: XXXIV	V/12	by Bach, C. P. E. (H 373) or Sorge?	01418
II 110	III		Fugue on B-A-C-H	C min.	Keyboard	42: XXXIV	V/12	by Sorge?	01420
II 112	III	1780 (Kirnb.)	Grave	E min.	Keyboard		V/12	by Kirnberger (EngK 16)	01422
II 114	III	1725 (AMB)	Notebook A. M. Bach (1725) No. 4 Minuet	G maj.	Keyboard	43^{2}: 26	V/4: 83	by Petzold	01424
II 115	III	1725 (AMB)	Notebook A. M. Bach (1725) No. 5 Minuet	G min.	Keyboard	43^{2}: 26	V/4: 84	by Petzold	01425
II 122	III	1725 (CPE)	Notebook A. M. Bach (1725) No. 16 March	D maj.	Keyboard	43^{2}: 32	V/4: 94	by Bach, C. P. E. (H 1/1)	01433
II 123	III	1725 (CPE)	Notebook A. M. Bach (1725) No. 17 Polonaise	G min.	Keyboard	43^{2}: 32	V/4: 95	by Bach, C. P. E. (H 1/2)	01434
II 124	III	1725 (CPE)	Notebook A. M. Bach (1725) No. 18 March	G maj.	Keyboard	43^{2}: 33	V/4: 96	by Bach, C. P. E. (H 1/3)	01435
II 125	III	1725 (CPE)	Notebook A. M. Bach (1725) No. 19 Polonaise	G min.	Keyboard	43^{2}: 33	V/4: 97	by Bach, C. P. E. (H 1/4)	01436
II 129	III	1725 (AMB)	Notebook A. M. Bach (1725) No. 27 Solo per il cembalo	E♭ maj.	Keyboard	43^{2}: 38	V/4: 104	by Bach, C. P. E. (H 16)	01440
II 130	III	1725 (AMB)	Notebook A. M. Bach (1725) No. 28 Polonaise	G maj.	Keyboard	43^{2}: 39	V/4: 106	by Hasse	01441
II 131	III	c.1745?	Notebook A. M. Bach (1725) No. 32	F maj.	Keyboard	43^{2}: 46	V/4: 121	by Bach, J. C. (W A22)	01442
II 133	III	1763 or later	Musical clock No. 1 Fantasia	G maj.	Musical clock		V/12	by Bach, W. F. (BR A63 F 207)	01444
II 134	III	1763 or later	Musical clock No. 2 Scherzo	G maj.	Musical clock		V/12	by Bach, W. F. (BR A64 F 207)	01445
II 135	III	1763 or later	Musical clock No. 3 Bourlesca	A min.	Musical clock		V/12	by Bach, W. F. (BR A65 F 207)	01446
II 136	III	1763 or later	Musical clock No. 4 Trio	A min.	Musical clock		V/12	by Bach, W. F. (BR A66 F 207)	01447
II 137	III	1763 or later	Musical clock No. 5 L'Intrada della Caccia	E♭ maj.	Musical clock		V/12	by Bach, W. F. (BR A67 F 207)	01448
II 138	III	1763 or later	Musical clock No. 6 Continuazione della Caccia	E♭ maj.	Musical clock		V/12	by Bach, W. F. (BR A68 F 207)	01449
II 139	III	1763 or later	Musical clock No. 7 Il Fine delle Caccia I	D maj.	Musical clock		V/12	by Bach, W. F. (BR A69 F 207)	01450
II 140	III	1763 or later	Musical clock No. 8 Il Fine delle Caccia II	D min.	Musical clock		V/12	by Bach, W. F. (BR A70 F 207)	01451
II 141	III	1763 or later	Musical clock No. 9 Song "O Gott die Christenheit"	F maj.	Musical clock		V/12	by Bach, W. F. (BR A71 F 207)	01452
II 142	III	1763 or later	Musical clock No. 10 Psalm 110	A min.	Musical clock		V/12	by Bach, W. F. (BR A72 F 207)	01453
II 143	III	1763 or later	Musical clock No. 11 Polonaise	E min.	Musical clock		V/12	by Bach, W. F. (BR A73 F 207)	01454
II 144	III	1763 or later	Musical clock No. 12 Polonaise Trio	A min.	Musical clock		V/12	by Bach, W. F. (BR A74 F 207)	01455
II 145	III	1763 or later	Musical clock No. 13 March	C maj.	Musical clock		V/12	by Bach, W. F. (BR A75 F 207)	01456
II 146	III	1763 or later	Musical clock No. 14 March	F maj.	Musical clock		V/12	by Bach, W. F. (BR A76 F 207)	01457
II 147	III	1763 or later	Musical clock No. 15 La Combattuta	G maj.	Musical clock		V/12	by Bach, W. F. (BR A77 F 207)	01458
II 148	III	1763 or later	Musical clock No. 16 Scherzo	G min.	Musical clock		V/12	by Bach, W. F. (BR A78 F 207)	01459
II 149	III	1763 or later	Musical clock No. 17 Minuet	G maj.	Musical clock		V/12	by Bach, W. F. (BR A79 F 207)	01460
II 150	III	1763 or later	Musical clock No. 18 Trio	G min.	Musical clock		V/12	by Bach, W. F. (BR A80 F 207)	01461
III 177	III		Prelude and Fugue	E♭ maj.	Keyboard	36: 88	V/12: 134	by Bach, J. Christoph?	01488
III 179	III	1728 (JDH)	Fantasia durch alle Tonarten gehend	A min.	Keyboard		V/12	by Heinichen	01490
III 180	III		Fugue	D min.	Keyboard	36: 188	V/12	by Kellner, J. P.	01491
III 181	III		Fugue	A min.	Keyboard		V/12	by Krebs, J. L. (Krebs‑WV 825/2)	01492
III 182	III		Passacaglia	D min.	Keyboard	42: 234	V/12	by Witt	01493
III 183	III	1725 (AMB)	Notebook A. M. Bach (1725) No. 6 Rondeau	B♭ maj.	Keyboard	43^{2}: 27	V/4: 85	by Couperin (6^{ième} Ordre: Les Bergeries)	01494
1036	III	1731 (CPE)	Trio	D min.	Vl Hc (2Vl Bc)		VI/5	by Bach, C. P. E. (H 569; Wq 145)	01218
1037	III	c. 1740s (JGG)	Sonata	C maj.	2Vl Bc	9: 229	VI/5	by Goldberg	01219
III 173	III	1712 (FAB) c. 1723 (JSB)	Invention	B min.	Vl Kb	45^{1}: 172	VI/5	by Bonporti (Op. 10 No. 2)	01484
III 174	III	1712 (FAB) c. 1723 (JSB)	Invention	B♭ maj.	Vl Kb	45^{1}: 176	VI/5	by Bonporti (Op. 10 No. 5)	01485
III 175	III	1712 (FAB) c. 1723 (JSB)	Invention	C min.	Vl Kb	45^{1}: 181	VI/5	by Bonporti (Op. 10 No. 6)	01486
III 176	III	1712 (FAB) c. 1723 (JSB)	Invention	D maj.	Vl Kb	45^{1}: 185	VI/5	by Bonporti (Op. 10 No. 7)	01487
III 184	III	c. 1747 (Zuc.)	Sonata	A min.	Vl Bc		VI/5	by Zuccari (Op. 1 No. 10)	01495
III 185	III		Sonata	D maj.	2Vl Bc		VI/5	by Bach, C. P. E. (H 585; ≈H 507; Wq 74)	01496
III 186	III		Sonata	F maj.	2Vl Bc		VI/5	by Bach, C. P. E. (H 576; Wq 154)	01497
III 187	III		Sonata (Trio)	F maj.	Bas Fl Vne		VI/5	by Bach, C. P. E. (H 589)	02454
III 188	III	c. 1740 (WFB)	Sonata (Concerto)	F maj.	2Hc	43^{1}: 47	V/12	by Bach, W. F. (BR A12 F 10)	01499
I 23	III	1710 (Alb.) c.1710 (JSB)	Concerto	E min.	2Vl Va Vc Vne		VI/5	by Albinoni (Op. 2 No. 4 = 2nd Concerto)	01331
III 189	III	1745–1747 (JSB)	Concerto	A min.	**Hc** Str Bc		VI/5	by Bach, C. P. E. (H 403; Wq 1)	01500
**Anh. N**	New additions to the Anhang								Up ↑

== Sources ==
- Acta Lipsiensium Academica, Oder, Leipziger Universitäts-Geschichte (in German). Leipzig: Johann Christoph Cörner. 1723. OCLC 875373050.
- Ahlgrimm, Isolde (1969). "Cornelius Heinrich Dretzel, der Autor des J. S. Bach zugeschriebenen Klavierwerkes BWV 897" [Cornelius Heinrich Dretzel, the composer of the keyboard piece BWV 897, ascribed to J. S. Bach]. In Dürr, Alfred; Neumann, Werner (eds.). Bach-Jahrbuch 1969 [Bach Yearbook 1969]. Bach-Jahrbuch (in German). Vol. 55. Neue Bachgesellschaft. Berlin: Evangelische Verlagsanstalt. pp. 67–77. doi:10.13141/bjb.v1969.
- Beißwenger, Kirsten (1991). "Bachs Eingriffe in Werke fremder Komponisten: Beobachtungen an den Notenhandschriften aus seiner Bibliothek unter besonderer Berücksichtigung der lateinischen Kirchenmusik" [Bach's editing of works by other composers: observations regarding the musical manuscripts from his library, with a particular focus on Latin church music]. In Schulze, Hans-Joachim; Wolff, Christoph (eds.). Bach-Jahrbuch 1991 [Bach Yearbook 1991]. Bach-Jahrbuch (in German). Vol. 77. Neue Bachgesellschaft. Berlin: Evangelische Verlagsanstalt. pp. 127–158. doi:10.13141/bjb.v1991. ISBN 3-374-01104-7. ISSN 0084-7682.
- Beißwenger, Kirsten (1992). Johann Sebastian Bachs Notenbibliothek [Johann Sebastian Bach's musical library]. Catalogus musicus (in German). Vol. XIII. Bärenreiter. ISBN 9783761810361. OCLC 680040660.
- Blanken, Christine (2019). "Das neue Bach-Werke-Verzeichnis: Das revidierte BWV enthält Neuerkenntnisse aus 15 Jahren Bachforschung" [The new Bach-Works-Catalogue: the revised BWV contains new data from fifteen years of Bach research]. www.bach-leipzig.de (in German). Leipzig: Bach Archive. "Der inzwischen durch zahlreiche Verschiebungen unübersichtlich gewordene Anhang wird ebenfalls komplett überarbeitet (transl.: The Anhang, which in the meanwhile has become confusing because of many changes, will also be completely reworked)"
- Bonporti, Francesco Antonio (1712). Invenzioni [Inventions] (in Italian). Vol. Op. 10. Bologna: Giuseppe Antonio Silvani.
- Buhle, Edward, ed. (1909). Sperontes Singende Muse an der Pleisse [Sperontes's Singing muse at the Pleisse]. Denkmäler Deutscher Tonkunst: Erste Folge (in German). Vol. XXXV–XXXVI. Leipzig: Breitkopf & Härtel.
- Dadelsen, Georg von (1957). Bemerkungen zur Handschrift Johann Sebastian Bachs, seiner Familie und seines Kreises [Remarks regarding the handwriting of Johann Sebastian Bach, his family and his circle]. Tübinger Bach-Studien (in German). Vol. I. Trossingen: Hohner. OCLC 642403437.
- David, Hans T. (1961). "A Lesser Secret of J. S. Bach Uncovered". Journal of the American Musicological Society. 14 (2). American Musicological Society. University of California Press: 199–223. doi:10.2307/829757. JSTOR 829757.
- Dirksen, Pieter [in Dutch] (1998). "Zur Frage des Autors der A-Dur-Toccata BWV Anh. 178" [On the question of the composer of the Toccata in A major BWV Anh. 178]. In Schulze, Hans-Joachim; Wolff, Christoph (eds.). Bach-Jahrbuch 1998 [Bach Yearbook 1998]. Bach-Jahrbuch (in German). Vol. 84. Neue Bachgesellschaft, Bach Archive. Leipzig: Evangelische Verlagsanstalt. pp. 121–136. doi:10.13141/bjb.v1998. ISBN 3-374-01695-2. ISSN 0084-7682.
- Dirksen, Pieter [in Dutch], ed. (2010). Johann Sebastian Bach: Complete Organ Works – Urtext (in German and English). Vol. 5: Sonatas / Trios / Concertos. Breitkopf & Härtel. EB 8805.
- Dirksen, Pieter [in Dutch], ed. (2016). Johann Sebastian Bach: Complete Organ Works – Urtext (in German and English). Vol. 3: Fantasias / Fugues. Breitkopf & Härtel. EB 8803.
- Dömling, Wolfgang [in German]; Kohlhase, Thomas [in German] (1971). Federhofer, Hellmut (ed.). "Kein Bach-Autograph: Die Handschrift Brüssel, Bibliothèque Royale, II. 4093 (Fétis 2960)". Acta Musicologica (in German). 43 (1/2). Basel: Bärenreiter: 108–109. doi:10.2307/932505. JSTOR 932505. Not a Bach-autograph: The manuscript Brussels, Royal Library, II 4093 (Fétis 2960)
- Dürr, Alfred (1952). "Zur Echtheit einiger Bach zugeschriebener Kantaten" [On the authenticity of some cantatas ascribed to Bach]. In Schneider, Max (ed.). Bach-Jahrbuch 1951–1952 [Bach Yearbook 1951–1952]. Bach-Jahrbuch (in German). Vol. 39. Neue Bachgesellschaft. Leipzig: VEB Deutsche Musikaliendruckerei. pp. 30–46. doi:10.13141/bjb.v1952.
- Dürr, Alfred (1954). "Johann Gottlieb Goldberg und die Triosonate BWV 1037" [Johann Gottlieb Goldberg and the trio sonata BWV 1037]. In Dürr, Alfred; Neumann, Werner (eds.). Bach-Jahrbuch 1953 [Bach Yearbook 1953]. Bach-Jahrbuch (in German). Vol. 40. Neue Bachgesellschaft. Berlin: Evangelische Verlagsanstalt. pp. 51–80. doi:10.13141/bjb.v1953.
- Dürr, Alfred, ed. (1987). Eight Short Preludes and Fugues BWV 553–560: formerly ascribed to Johann Sebastian Bach (in German and English). Kassel: Bärenreiter. ISMN 9790006480098. BA 6497.
- Dürr, Alfred; Kobayashi, Yoshitake, eds. (1998). Bach Werke Verzeichnis: Kleine Ausgabe – Nach der von Wolfgang Schmieder vorgelegten 2. Ausgabe [Bach Works Catalogue: Small Edition – After Wolfgang Schmieder's 2nd edition] (in German). Kirsten Beißwenger (collaborator). (BWV^{2a} ed.). Wiesbaden: Breitkopf & Härtel. ISBN 9783765102493. Preface in English and German.
- Dürr, Alfred; Jones, Richard D. P. (2006). The Cantatas of J. S. Bach: With Their Librettos in German-English Parallel Text. Oxford University Press. ISBN 978-0-19-929776-4.
- Eichberg, Hartwig (1976). "Unechtes unter Johann Sebastian Bachs Klavierwerken" [Inauthentic among the keyboard works of Johann Sebastian Bach]. In Schulze, Hans-Joachim; Wolff, Christoph (eds.). Bach-Jahrbuch 1975 [Bach Yearbook 1975]. Bach-Jahrbuch (in German). Vol. 61. Neue Bachgesellschaft. Berlin: Evangelische Verlagsanstalt. pp. 7–49. doi:10.13141/bjb.v1975.
- Eppstein, Hans [in German] (1966). Studien über J. S. Bachs Sonaten für ein Melodieinstrument und obligates Cembalo [Studies on J. S. Bach's Sonatas for a melody instrument and harpsichord obligato]. Studia musicologica Upsaliensia (in German). Vol. 2. Uppsala: Almqvist & Wiksell.
- Eppstein, Hans [in German] (1982). "Zur Problematik von Johann Sebastian Bachs Flötensonaten" [On the problems of Johann Sebastian Bach's flute sonatas]. In Schulze, Hans-Joachim; Wolff, Christoph (eds.). Bach-Jahrbuch 1981 [Bach Yearbook 1981]. Bach-Jahrbuch (in German). Vol. 67. Neue Bachgesellschaft. Berlin: Evangelische Verlagsanstalt. pp. 77–90. doi:10.13141/bjb.v1981. ISSN 0084-7682.
- Feder, Georg (1958). Albrecht, Hans [in German] (ed.). "Bemerkungen über einige J. S. Bach zugeschriebene Werke". Die Musikforschung (in German). 11 (1). Gesellschaft für Musikforschung. Bärenreiter: 76–79. JSTOR 41115075.
- Glöckner, Andreas (1983). "Die Leipziger Neukirchenmusik und das "Kleine Magnificat" BWV Anh. 21" [The music for the New Church in Leipzig and the "Little Magnificat" BWV Anh. 21]. In Schulze, Hans-Joachim; Wolff, Christoph (eds.). Bach-Jahrbuch 1982 [Bach Yearbook 1982]. Bach-Jahrbuch (in German). Vol. 68. Neue Bachgesellschaft. Berlin: Evangelische Verlagsanstalt. pp. 97–102. doi:10.13141/bjb.v1982. ISSN 0084-7682.
- Heinichen, Johann David (1728). Der General-Bass in der Composition (in German). Vol. II. Dresden.
- Hellmann, Diethard, ed. (1965). Johann Sebastian Bach: Concerto (Triosonate) für Violine, Violoncello und Basso continuo C-dur (BWV 525a) [Johann Sebastian Bach: Concerto (Trio sonata) for violin, cello and basso continuo in C major (BWV 525a)] (in German). Breitkopf & Härtel. ISMN 979-0-004-16727-4. EB 6466.
- Henrici, Christian Friedrich (a.k.a. Picander) (1725). "Erbauliche Gedanken auf den Grünen Donnerstag und Charfreitag über den Leidenden Jesum". Sammlung erbaulicher Gedancken über und auf die gewöhnlichen Sonn- und Festtage (in German). Leipzig: Boetius. pp. 293ff.
- Hoffmann, Balthasar (1738). "IX. Bey der Lob- und Trauerrede auf die verwitwete Herzoginn von Merseb. Hedwig, im Jahre 1735". In Gottsched, Johann Christoph (ed.). Der Deutschen Gesellschaft in Leipzig Oden und Cantaten in vier Büchern (in German). Vol. I. Leipzig: Bernhard Christoph Breitkopf. pp. 143–146.
- Hofmann, Klaus (1983). "Zur Echtheit der Motette "Jauchzet dem Herrn, alle Welt" BWV Anh. 160". In Rehm, Wolfgang (ed.). Bachiana et alia musicologica: Festschrift Alfred Dürr zum 65. Geburtstag am 3. Marz 1983 (in German). Bärenreiter. pp. 126–140. ISBN 3761806833.
- Hofmann, Klaus (1987). "'Wo sind meine Wunderwerke' – eine verschollene Thomasschulkantate Johann Sebastian Bachs?" [Wo sind meine Wunderwerke – a lost St Thomasschool cantata by Johann Sebastian Bach?]. In Schulze, Hans-Joachim; Wolff, Christoph (eds.). Bach-Jahrbuch 1988 [Bach Yearbook 1988]. Bach-Jahrbuch (in German). Vol. 74. Neue Bachgesellschaft. Berlin: Evangelische Verlagsanstalt. pp. 211–218. doi:10.13141/bjb.v1988. ISBN 3-374-00176-9. ISSN 0084-7682.
- Hofmann, Klaus (1999). "Ein verschollenes Kammermusikwerk Johann Sebastian Bachs: Zur Fassungsgeschichte der Orgelsonate Es-Dur (BWV 525) und der Sonate A-Dur für Flöte und Cembalo (BWV 1032)" [A lost chamber music work by Johann Sebastian Bach: On the genesis of the organ sonata in E-flat major (BWV 525) and the sonata in A major for flute and harpsichord (BWV 1032)]. In Schulze, Hans-Joachim; Wolff, Christoph (eds.). Bach-Jahrbuch 1999 [Bach Yearbook 1999]. Bach-Jahrbuch (in German). Vol. 85. Neue Bachgesellschaft, Bach Archive. Leipzig: Evangelische Verlagsanstalt. pp. 67–79. doi:10.13141/bjb.v1999. ISBN 3-374-01763-0. ISSN 0084-7682.
- Keller, Hermann [in French] (1937). "Unechte Orgelwerke Bachs" [Inauthentic Bach compositions for organ]. In Schering, Arnold (ed.). Bach-Jahrbuch 1937 [Bach Yearbook 1937]. Bach-Jahrbuch (in German). Vol. 34. Neue Bachgesellschaft. Leipzig: Breitkopf & Härtel. pp. 59–82. doi:10.13141/bjb.v1937.
- Kenyon, Nicholas (2011). The Faber Pocket Guide to Bach. Faber & Faber. ISBN 9780571272006.
- Kirnberger, Johann Philipp (1774). "(Anhang)". Die Kunst des reinen Satzes in der Musik (in German). Vol. I. pp. I–VI.
- Kirnberger, Johann Philipp (1780). "Præludium". Diverses Pièces pour le Clavecin (in French). J. J. Hummel. p. 16.
- Kobayashi, Yoshitake (1978). "Neuerkenntnisse zu einigen Bach-Quellen an Hand schriftkundlicher Untersuchungen" [New acknowledgements regarding some Bach-sources based on handwriting research]. In Schulze, Hans-Joachim; Wolff, Christoph (eds.). Bach-Jahrbuch 1978 [Bach Yearbook 1978]. Bach-Jahrbuch (in German). Vol. 64. Neue Bachgesellschaft. Berlin: Evangelische Verlagsanstalt. pp. 43–60. doi:10.13141/bjb.v1978.
- Koska, Bernd (2011). "Bach oder Dobenecker? Zur Frage der Autorschaft von BWV Anh. 85 und 101" [Bach or Dobenecker? On the authorship question of BWV Anh. 85 and 101]. In Wollny, Peter (ed.). Bach-Jahrbuch 2011 [Bach Yearbook 2011]. Bach-Jahrbuch (in German). Vol. 97. Neue Bachgesellschaft. Leipzig: Evangelische Verlagsanstalt. pp. 259–263. doi:10.13141/bjb.v2011. ISBN 978-3-374-02986-0. ISSN 0084-7682.
- Kretzschmar, Hermann (1910). "Das Notenbuch der Zeumerin" [The notebook of the Zeumerin]. Jahrbuch der Musikbibliothek Peters für 1909 [Yearbook of the musiclibrary Peters for 1909]. Jahrbuch der Musikbibliothek Peters (in German). Vol. 16. Musikbibliothek Peters. Leipzig: C. F. Peters. pp. 57–72.
- Landmann, Arno (1907). "Angeblich von J. S. Bach komponierte Oden von Chr. H. von Hoffmannswaldau" [Likely by J. S. Bach composed odes of Chr. H. von Hoffmannswaldau]. In Schering, Arnold (ed.). Bach-Jahrbuch 1907 [Bach Yearbook 1907]. Bach-Jahrbuch (in German). Vol. 4. Neue Bachgesellschaft. Breitkopf & Härtel. pp. 79–88. doi:10.13141/bjb.v1907.
- Leisinger, Ulrich [in German]; Wollny, Peter (1993). "'Altes Zeug von mir': Carl Philipp Emanuel Bachs kompositorisches Schaffen vor 1740" ['Old stuff for me': Carl Philipp Emanuel Bach's compositorial activities before 1740]. In Schulze, Hans-Joachim; Wolff, Christoph (eds.). Bach-Jahrbuch 1993 [Bach Yearbook 1993]. Bach-Jahrbuch (in German). Vol. 79. Neue Bachgesellschaft. Leipzig: Evangelische Verlagsanstalt. pp. 127–204. doi:10.13141/bjb.v1993. ISBN 3-374-01516-6. ISSN 0084-7682.
- Meiningen 1704: Sonn- und Fest-Andachten Uber die ordentlichen Evangelia Aus gewissen Biblischen Texten Alten und Neuen Testaments Und In der Hoch-Fürstl. Sachs. Meining. Hof-Capell Der Heil. Dreyfaltigkeit Deroselben zu Ehren abgesungen (in German). Meiningen. 1704.
- Morana, Frank (1993). "The 'Dobenecker' Toccata, BWV-Anh. II 85: An Early Bach Work?". Bach. 24 (2). Berea, Ohio: Riemenschneider Bach Institute: 26–37. ISSN 0005-3600. JSTOR 41640382.
- Perreault, Jean M. (2004). Fitch, Donna K. (ed.). The Thematic Catalogue of the Musical Works of Johann Pachelbel. Lanham, Maryland: Scarecrow Press. ISBN 0-8108-4970-4.
- Pfau, Marc-Roderich (2008). "Ein unbekanntes Leipziger Kantatentextheft aus dem Jahr 1735: Neues zum Thema Bach und Stölzel" [An unknown Leipzig cantata text publication from the year 1735: News regarding Bach and Stölzel]. In Wollny, Peter (ed.). Bach-Jahrbuch 2008 [Bach Yearbook 2008]. Bach-Jahrbuch (in German). Vol. 94. Neue Bachgesellschaft. Leipzig: Evangelische Verlagsanstalt. pp. 99–122. doi:10.13141/bjb.v2008. ISBN 978-3-374-02668-5. ISSN 0084-7682.
- Platen, Emil [in German] (1976). "Zur Echtheit einiger Choralsätze Johann Sebastian Bachs" [On the authenticity of some of Johann Sebastian Bach's chorale settings]. In Schulze, Hans-Joachim; Wolff, Christoph (eds.). Bach-Jahrbuch 1975 [Bach Yearbook 1975]. Bach-Jahrbuch (in German). Vol. 61. Neue Bachgesellschaft. Berlin: Evangelische Verlagsanstalt. pp. 50–62. doi:10.13141/bjb.v1975.
- Scheide, William H. [in German] (1960). "Johann Sebastian Bachs Sammlung von Kantaten seines Vetters Johann Ludwig Bach" [Johann Sebastian Bach's collection of cantatas by his cousin Johann Ludwig Bach]. In Dürr, Alfred; Neumann, Werner (eds.). Bach-Jahrbuch 1959 [Bach Yearbook 1959]. Bach-Jahrbuch (in German). Vol. 46. Neue Bachgesellschaft. Berlin: Evangelische Verlagsanstalt. pp. 52–94. doi:10.13141/bjb.v1959.
- Schicht, Johann Gottfried, ed. (1805). Messa a 8 voci reali e 4 ripiene coll'accompagnamento di due Orchestre, composta da Giov. Sebast. Bach: Partitura, copiata dalla partitura autografa dell' Autore [Mass in eight real voices and four additional voices, accompanied by two Orchestras, composed by Joh. Sebast. Bach: Score, copied from the autograph score of the Author] (in Italian and Latin). Leipzig: Breitkopf & Härtel. Harvard Digital Collections.
- Schmieder, Wolfgang, ed. (1950). Thematisch-systematisches Verzeichnis der musikalischen Werke von Johann Sebastian Bach: Bach-Werke-Verzeichnis [Thematic-Systematic Catalogue of the Musical Works of Johann Sebastian Bach: Bach-Works-Catalogue] (in German) (BWV^{1} ed.). Leipzig: Breitkopf & Härtel. OCLC 963027464. Unaltered up unto its eighth printing in 1986.
- Schmieder, Wolfgang, ed. (1990). Thematisch-systematisches Verzeichnis der musikalischen Werke von Johann Sebastian Bach: Bach-Werke-Verzeichnis – 2. überarbeitete und erweiterte Ausgabe [Thematic-Systematic Catalogue of the Musical Works of Johann Sebastian Bach: Bach-Works-Catalogue – 2nd reworked and enlarged edition] (in German) (BWV^{2} ed.). Wiesbaden: Breitkopf & Härtel. ISBN 9783765102554.
- Schneider, Max (1907). "Thematisches Verzeichnis der musikalischen Werke der Familie Bach (I. Teil)" [Thematic catalogue of compositions by the Bach family (Part I)]. In Schering, Arnold (ed.). Bach-Jahrbuch 1907 [Bach Yearbook 1907]. Bach-Jahrbuch (in German). Vol. 4. Neue Bachgesellschaft. Breitkopf & Härtel. pp. 103–177. doi:10.13141/bjb.v1907.
- Schneider, Max (1912). "Zur Lukaspassion" [On the St Luke Passion]. In Schering, Arnold (ed.). Bach-Jahrbuch 1911 [Bach Yearbook 1911]. Bach-Jahrbuch (in German). Vol. 8. Neue Bachgesellschaft. Breitkopf & Härtel. pp. 105–108. doi:10.13141/bjb.v1911.
- Scholze, Johann Sigismund (a.k.a. Sperontes) (1736). Singende Muse an der Pleiße [Singing muse at the Pleiße] (in German). Vol. I. Leipzig.
- Schulenberg, David [in French] (2010). "An Enigmatic Legacy: Two Instrumental Works Attributed to Wilhelm Friedemann Bach". Bach. 41 (2). Berea, Ohio: Riemenschneider Bach Institute: 24–60. ISSN 0005-3600. JSTOR 41640603.
- Schulenberg, David [in French], ed. (2013). Johann Sebastian Bach: Complete Organ Works – Urtext (in German and English). Vol. 1: Preludes and Fugues I. Breitkopf & Härtel. EB 8801.
- Schulze, Hans-Joachim (1980). "Ein 'Dresdner Menuett' im zweiten Klavierbüchlein der Anna Magdalena Bach: Nebst Hinweisen zur Überlieferung einiger Kammermusikwerke Bachs" [A Minuet from Dresden in the second keyboard booklet of Anna Magdalena Bach: Further, indications regarding the transmission of some of Bach's chamber music compositions]. In Schulze, Hans-Joachim; Wolff, Christoph (eds.). Bach-Jahrbuch 1979 [Bach Yearbook 1979]. Bach-Jahrbuch (in German). Vol. 65. Neue Bachgesellschaft. Berlin: Evangelische Verlagsanstalt. pp. 45–64. doi:10.13141/bjb.v1979.
- Schulze, Hans-Joachim (1984). Studien zur Bach-Überlieferung im 18. Jahrhundert [Studies of the Bach-transmission in the 18th century] (in German). Peters. ISBN 3-87626-095-7. EP 9346.
- Siegele, Ulrich (1957). "Noch einmal: Die Violinsonate BWV 1024" [Yet again: The violin sonata BWV 1024]. In Dürr, Alfred; Neumann, Werner (eds.). Bach-Jahrbuch 1956 [Bach Yearbook 1956]. Bach-Jahrbuch (in German). Vol. 43. Neue Bachgesellschaft. Berlin: Evangelische Verlagsanstalt. pp. 124–139. doi:10.13141/bjb.v1956.
- Spitta, Philipp (1899). Johann Sebastian Bach: His Work and Influence on the Music of Germany, 1685–1750. Translated by Bell, Clara; Fuller Maitland, John Alexander. Novello & Co.
  - Volume I
  - Volume II
  - Volume III
- Spitta, Philipp (1894). "Sperontes' Singende Muse an der Pleisse: Zur Geschichte des deutschen Hausgesanges im achtzehnten Jahrhundert" [Sperontes's Singende Muse an der Pleisse: On the history of German singing-at-home in the 18th century]. Musikgeschichtliche Aufsätze [Essays on music history] (in German). Berlin: Paetel. pp. 175ff.
- Thielemann, Arne (2012). "Zur Identifizierung des Magnificats BWV Anh. 30 aus Johann Sebastian Bachs Notenbibliothek" [On the identification of the Magnificat BWV Anh. 30 from Johann Sebastian Bach's music library]. In Wollny, Peter (ed.). Bach-Jahrbuch 2012 [Bach Yearbook 2012]. Bach-Jahrbuch (in German). Vol. 98. Neue Bachgesellschaft. Leipzig: Evangelische Verlagsanstalt. pp. 217–224. doi:10.13141/bjb.v2012. ISBN 978-3-374-02668-5. ISSN 0084-7682.
- Tittel, Karl (1966). "Welche unter J. S. Bachs Namen geführten Orgelwerke sind Johann Tobias bzw. Johann Ludwig Krebs zuzuschreiben? Ein Versuch zur Lösung von Autorschaftsproblemen" [Which of the organ works for which J. S. Bach has been named as author can be ascribed to Johann Tobias or Johann Ludwig Krebs? An attempt to resolve authorship issues]. In Dürr, Alfred; Neumann, Werner (eds.). Bach-Jahrbuch 1966 [Bach Yearbook 1966]. Bach-Jahrbuch (in German). Vol. 52. Neue Bachgesellschaft. Berlin: Evangelische Verlagsanstalt. pp. 102–137. doi:10.13141/bjb.v1966.
- Torri, Pietro (2013). Thielemann, Arne (ed.). Magnificat in C: BWV Anh. 30. Stuttgarter Bach-Ausgaben. Vol. Full score. Bach, Johann Sebastian (arranger); Horn, Paul (basso continuo realization). Stuttgart: Carus. 35.012.
- "US-NHub Music Deposit 31 (Klavierbüchlein für W. F. Bach)". Bach Digital. Leipzig: Bach Archive; et al. 2020-03-03.
- van Leyden, Rolf (1956). "Die Violinsonate BWV 1024" [The violin sonata BWV 1024]. In Dürr, Alfred; Neumann, Werner (eds.). Bach-Jahrbuch 1955 [Bach Yearbook 1955]. Bach-Jahrbuch (in German). Vol. 42. Neue Bachgesellschaft. Berlin: Evangelische Verlagsanstalt. pp. 73–102. doi:10.13141/bjb.v1955.
- Vetter, Daniel (1713). Musicalische Kirch- und Hauß-Ergötzlichkeit (in German). Vol. 2. Leipzig. OCLC 857536916.
- Williams, Peter (2003). The Organ Music of J. S. Bach. Cambridge University Press. ISBN 978-0-521-89115-8.
- Wollny, Peter (2015). "Vom "apparat der auserleßensten kirchen Stücke" zum "Vorrath an Musicalien, von J. S. Bach und andern berühmten Musicis": Quellenkundliche Ermittlungen zur frühen Thüringer Bach-Überlieferung und zu einigen Weimarer Schülern und Kollegen Bachs". Bach-Jahrbuch 2015 [Bach Yearbook 2015]. Bach-Jahrbuch (in German). Vol. 101. Neue Bachgesellschaft. Leipzig: Evangelische Verlagsanstalt. ISBN 978-3-374-04320-0. ISSN 0084-7682.
- Wright, Craig (2000). "Bachs Kleines harmonisches Labyrinth (BWV 591): Echtheitsfragen und theologischer Hintergrund" [Bach's Little Harmonical Labyrinth (BWV 591): Authenticity issues and theological background]. In Schulze, Hans-Joachim; Wolff, Christoph (eds.). Bach-Jahrbuch 2000 [Bach Yearbook 2000]. Bach-Jahrbuch (in German). Vol. 86. Translated by Steinwachs, Barbara. Neue Bachgesellschaft. Leipzig: Evangelische Verlagsanstalt. pp. 51–65. doi:10.13141/bjb.v2000. ISBN 3-374-01828-9. ISSN 0084-7682.
- Zahn, Johannes (1889–1893). Die Melodien der deutschen evangelischen Kirchenlieder (in German). Vol. I–VI. Gütersloh: Bertelsmann.
- Zuccari, Carlo (c. 1747). "Sonata X" [Sonata No. 10]. Sonate a Violino, e Basso ò Cembalo: Opera Prima [Sonatas for violin, and bass or harpsichord, Op. 1] (in Italian). Vol. I. Milan. pp. 16–20.
