= List of compositions by Johann Ludwig Krebs =

This page contains a list of compositions by Johann Ludwig Krebs as compiled by Felix Friedrich in the Krebs-Werkeverzeichnis (Krebs Works Catalogue).

The catalogue is divided into nine sections by category, with each work assigned a Krebs-WV number (sometimes seen as KrebsWV or KWV in recordings and other sources). Unassigned numbers were left at the end of each section to accommodate future discoveries or attributions while maintaining the category structure.

The order within each category is not chronological, as many of Krebs' works cannot be dated. The order within published collections, such as the Clavier-Übung, was maintained.

Questions of authorship were addressed in several ways. A number of anonymous works were listed in the final section (Krebs-WV 9xx) that have been attributed to Krebs but cannot be verified. There are also a number of works that are ascribed to Krebs and other composers in various sources. These were included in the main sections but noted as such.

The Eight Short Preludes and Fugues, originally attributed to Johann Sebastian Bach as BWV 553–560, were not included in the Krebs-WV. The authorship of these pieces has been debated for many years, with Krebs, his father Johann Tobias Krebs and other students of Bach suggested as the true author. Friedrich decided not to include the pieces in the catalogue, noting that recent scholarship, including the critical reports submitted for the New Bach Edition, has viewed Krebs's authorship with extreme doubt, and that no new insights on the issue have emerged in recent years.

== Masses, cantatas, motets and arias (Krebs-WV 1xx) ==
Krebs-WV	Composition	Notes
100	Oratorio funebre	Dramma per Musica
100	Oratorio funebre (Dramma per Musica)	
101	Missa (brevis) in F major	
102	Sanctus in D major	
103	Sanctus in D major	
104	Sanctus in F major	BWV Anh. II 27/Anh. III 167→
105	Magnificat in D major	
106	Cantata Der Herr hat Großes an uns getan	
107	Cantata Erthönt erfreute Andachts-Lieder	Music lost.
108	Cantata Gott fähret auf mit Jauchzen	
109	Cantata Herzlich tut mich verlangen	
110	Cantata Jesu, meine Freude	
111 *	Cantata Lobet den Herrn in seinem Heiligtum	Also attributed to his son, Johann Gottfried Krebs.
112	Cantata Seid barmherzig, wie auch euer Vater barmherzig ist	
113	Cantata Uns ist ein Kind	
150	Magnificat in F major	
151	Motet Enforsche mich, Gott	
152	Motet Tröste uns Gott, unser Heiland	Music lost.
153	Aria Bist du noch fern	

== Orchestral works (Krebs-WV 2xx) ==
Krebs-WV	Composition	Notes
200	Sinfonia in C minor	2 Violins, Viola and Basso Continuo
201	Sinfonia in E♭ major	2 Violins, Viola and Basso Continuo
202	Concerto for Lute and Strings in C major	
203	Concerto for Lute and Strings in F major	
204	Concerto for Oboe, Harpsichord and Strings in B minor	

== Chamber music (Krebs-WV 3xx) ==
Krebs-WV	Composition	Notes
300	Sonata I in A major	Sonatas da camera for harpsichord with flute or violin (publ. 1760)
301	Sonata II in G major	Sonatas da camera for harpsichord with flute or violin (publ. 1760)
302	Sonata III in C major	Sonatas da camera for harpsichord with flute or violin (publ. 1760)
303	Sonata IV in E minor	Sonatas da camera for harpsichord with flute or violin (publ. 1760)
304	Sonata V in A minor	Sonatas da camera for harpsichord with flute or violin (publ. 1760)
305	Sonata VI in D major	Sonatas da camera for harpsichord with flute or violin (publ. 1760)
306	Sonata I in D major	Two Sonatas for harpsichord and flute or violin (publ. c.1752)
307	Sonata II in G major	Two Sonatas for harpsichord and flute or violin (publ. c.1752)
308	Sonata I in E♭ major	Six Sonatas for solo violin and bass (publ. 1767)
309	Sonata II in B♭ major	Six Sonatas for solo violin and bass (publ. 1767)
310	Sonata III in A major	Six Sonatas for solo violin and bass (publ. 1767)
311	Sonata IV in C minor	Six Sonatas for solo violin and bass (publ. 1767)
312	Sonata V in E♭ major	Six Sonatas for solo violin and bass (publ. 1767)
313	Sonata VI in A minor	Six Sonatas for solo violin and bass (publ. 1767)
314	Sonata I in D major	Three Sonatas for violin and harpsichord
315	Sonata II in E major	Three Sonatas for violin and harpsichord
316	Sonata III in C major	Three Sonatas for violin and harpsichord
317	Trio I in D major	Six Trios for flute I, flute II or violin, and harpsichord (publ. c.1743)
318	Trio II in B minor	Six Trios for flute I, flute II or violin, and harpsichord (publ. c.1743)
319	Trio III in A minor	Six Trios for flute I, flute II or violin, and harpsichord (publ. c.1743)
320	Trio IV in E minor	Six Trios for flute I, flute II or violin, and harpsichord (publ. c.1743)
321	Trio V in G major	Six Trios for flute I, flute II or violin, and harpsichord (publ. c.1743)
322	Trio VI in A minor	Six Trios for flute I, flute II or violin, and harpsichord (publ. c.1743)
323	Trio I in D minor	Sonatas for flute and violin with bass (publ. 1763)
324	Trio II in D minor	Sonatas for flute and violin with bass (publ. 1763)
325	Trio III in D major	Sonatas for flute and violin with bass (publ. 1763)
326	Trio in A minor / C major	
327	Sonata in A major	
328	Sonata in C major	

== Free organ works (Krebs-WV 4xx) ==
Krebs-WV	Composition	Notes
400	Prelude and Fugue in C major	
401	Prelude in C major	Formerly attributed to J. S. Bach as BWV 567.
402	Prelude and Fugue in C minor	
403	Prelude in C minor	
404	Prelude and Fugue in D major	
405	Prelude and Fugue in D minor	
406	Toccata and Fugue in E major	
407	Prelude and Fugue in F minor	
408	Prelude and Fugue in F minor	Published as separate pieces in Weinberger's edition (vol. II, nos. 3 & 14). (Note: There is no autograph for the prelude. It first appears, paired with the fugue, in 19th-century published editions. An autograph for the fugue exists, but it bears no indication of an accompanying prelude. So while the works are a harmonious combination, there is no definitive evidence that Krebs intended them to be paired. Weinberger publishes them separately but performs them together in his recording. Friedrich combines them in the catalogue but performs them separately in his recording.)
409 *	Prelude and Fugue in F♯ major	Fugue also attributed to J. S. Bach (BWV Anh. II 97/Anh. III 181→)
410	Prelude and Fugue in G major	
411	Toccata and Fugue in A minor	
412	Prelude in F major	
413	Prelude in F major	
414	Prelude in C major	
415	Prelude in C major	
416	Prelude	
417	Prelude	
418	Fantasia in F major	
419	Fantasia in F major	
420	Fantasia and Fugue in F major	
421	Fantasia in F major	
422	Fantasia á gusto italiano	
423	Fantasia and Fugue fragment in G major	
424 *	Fantasia in A major (An imitation of the Nightingale)	Attribution doubted on stylistic grounds; possibly by his father, Johann Tobias Krebs.
425	Fugue in C minor	
426	Fugue in C minor	
427	Fugue in E♭ major	
428	Fugue in F major	
429	Fugue in F minor	
430	Fugue in G minor	
431	Fugue in A minor	
432	Fugue in A minor	
433	Fugue in B♭ major	
434	Fugue in B♭ major on B-A-C-H	
435	Trio in C major	
436	Trio in C major	
437	Trio in C minor	
438	Trio in C minor	
439	Trio in D minor	
440	Trio in D minor	
441	Trio in D minor	
442	Trio in E♭ major	
443	Trio in E♭ major	
444	Trio in E minor	
445	Trio in E minor	
446	Trio in F major	
447	Trio in F major	
448	Trio in F major	
449	Trio in G major	
450	Trio in A minor	
451	Trio in B♭ major	
?	Fuga in G minor	No. 16 in G. Weinberger's J. L. Krebs Sämtliche Orgelwerke edition, Band II (1985).

== Organ works based on chorales (Krebs-WV 5xx) ==
Krebs-WV	Composition	Notes
Each work in part I of the Clavier-Übung (500-512) consists of a preambulum, a chorale setting, and a chorale alio modo (melody with b.c.)
500	Allein Gott in der Höh sei Ehr	Clavier-Übung, part I (publ. 1744)
501	Wer nur den lieben Gott läßt walten	Clavier-Übung, part I (publ. 1744)
502	Jesu, meine Freude	Clavier-Übung, part I (publ. 1744)
503	Christ lag in Todesbanden	Clavier-Übung, part I (publ. 1744)
504	Ach Gott, vom Himmel sieh darein	Clavier-Übung, part I (publ. 1744)
505	Auf meinen lieben Gott	Clavier-Übung, part I (publ. 1744)
506	Vater unser im Himmelreich	Clavier-Übung, part I (publ. 1744)
507	Sei Lob und Ehr	Clavier-Übung, part I (publ. 1744)
508	Was Gott tut, das ist wohlgetan	Clavier-Übung, part I (publ. 1744)
509	Erbarm dich mein, o Herre Gott	Clavier-Übung, part I (publ. 1744)
510	Von Gott will ich nicht lassen	Clavier-Übung, part I (publ. 1744)
511	Warum betrübst du dich, mein Herz	Clavier-Übung, part I (publ. 1744)
512	Jesus, meine Zuversicht	Clavier-Übung, part I (publ. 1744)
513	Ach Gott, erhör mein Seufzen	
514 *	Ach Herr, mich armen Sünder	Also attributed to JS Bach and to Gottfried August Homilius.
515 *	Ach Herr, mich armen Sünder	Anonymous chorale to which Krebs' name was inscribed at a later date. Possibly by Homilius.
516	Allein Gott in der Höh sei Ehr	
517 *	Auf meinen lieben Gott	Also attributed to JS Bach (BWV 744, Emans 29).
518	Ein feste Burg ist unser Gott	
519	Fantasia on Freu dich sehr, o meine Seele	
520 *	Freu dich sehr, o meine Seele	Attributed to Krebs but uncertainty because of 520a. If 520a is by Bach, then perhaps Krebs added the pedals.
520a *	Freu dich sehr, o meine Seele (variant, manuals only)	Attributed to JS Bach (BWV deest, Emans 72)
521	Herr Gott, dich loben alle wir	a 2 Claviere e Pedal
522	Herr Gott, dich loben alle wir	per Canonem
523	Herr, ich habe mißgehandelt	
524	Fantasia on Herr Jesu Christ, dich zu uns wend	= BWV Anh. III 172
525	Herr Jesu Christ, du höchstes Gut	
526	Herzlich lieb hab ich dich, o Herr	
527	Herzlich lieb hab ich dich, o Herr	
528 *	Heut triumphieret Gottes Sohn	Attributed to Krebs at a later date, but doubtful on stylistic grounds. Possibly by Christian Friedrich Rolle.
529	Ich ruf zu dir, Herr Jesu Christ	
529a	Ich ruf zu dir, Herr Jesu Christ (variant)	
530	Ich ruf zu dir, Herr Jesu Christ	
531	Jesu, der du meine Seele	
532 *	Jesu, meine Freude	Doubts due to stylistic issues and the unreliability of the only source.
533	Jesu, meines Lebens Leben	
534 *	Jesu, meines Lebens Leben	Manuscript bears no attribution of authorship but follows five chorales that have been attributed to Krebs, and is consistent with his style.
535	Fantasia sopra Jesus, meine Zuversicht	
536	Meinen Jesum laß ich nicht	
537 *	Prelude on Meinen Jesum laß ich nicht	Questionable on stylistic grounds, perhaps by Gottfried Krebs or Ehrenfried Christian Traugott Krebs.
538	Trio on Mein Gott, das Herze bring ich dir	
539	Mitten wir im Leben sind	
540	Nun freut euch, lieben Christen gmein	
541	Nun freut euch, lieben Christen gmein	
542	O Ewigkeit, du Donnerwort	
543	O Gott, du frommer Gott	
544	O König, dessen Majestät	
545	Vom Himmel hoch, da komm ich her	
546	Von Gott will ich nicht lassen	
547	Warum betrübst du dich, mein Herz	
548	Fantasia on Warum sollt ich mich denn grämen	
548a	Fantasia on Warum sollt ich mich denn grämen (variant)	
549	Was Gott tut, das ist wohlgetan	
550	Wenn mein Stündlein vorhanden	
551	Fantasia on Wer nur den lieben Gott läßt walten	
552	Wie schön leuchtet der Morgenstern	
553	Wir glauben all an einen Gott	Three verses
554	Wir glauben all an einen Gott	Cantus firmus in tenor.
554a	Wir glauben all an einen Gott (variant)	Double pedal, cantus firmus in soprano.
554b	Wir glauben all an einen Gott (variant)	Cantus firmus in soprano.
554c *	Wir glauben all an einen Gott (variant)	Double pedal, cantus firmus in soprano. Previously attributed to Bach (BWV 740) but now generally considered to be by Krebs. (Note: There has been much debate over the authorship of Krebs-WV 554c (BWV 740). All four versions of the chorale have been handed down only in published editions: Krebs-WV 554, 554a and 554b attributed to Krebs, and 554c attributed to Bach. However, the structural concept of 554c is very similar to that of 554a, suggesting that they are by the same author. Doubts of Bach's authorship of 554c have also been raised on stylistic grounds. The likely attribution of 554c to Krebs is asserted by Tittel (1966) and accepted by Emans (1997), Weinberger (1986) and Williams (2003). BWV 740 was not included in the New Bach Edition (Emans 2008).)
555	Wo soll ich fliehen hin	
556	Zeuch ein zu deinen Toren	

== Free works for organ and a second instrument (Krebs-WV 6xx) ==
Krebs-WV	Composition	Notes
600	Fantasia in C major	trumpet and organ
601	Fantasia in C major	flute and organ
602	Fantasia in F major	oboe and organ
603	Fantasia in F major	oboe and organ
604	Fantasia in F minor	oboe and organ

== Works based on chorales for organ and a second instrument (Krebs-WV 7xx) ==
Krebs-WV	Composition	Notes
700	Es ist gewisslich an der Zeit	corno da caccia and organ
701	Gott der Vater wohn uns bei	trumpet and organ
702	Herr Jesu Christ, meines Lebens Licht	oboe and organ
703	Herzlich lieb ich dich, o Herr	trumpet and organ
704	Ich hab in Gottes Herz	oboe and organ
705	In allen meinen Taten	trumpet and organ
706	Jesu, meine Freude	oboe and organ
707	Komm, Heiliger Geist	oboe and organ
708	Kommt her zu mir, spricht Gottes Sohn	oboe and organ
709	Meine Seel ermuntre dich	oboe and organ
710	O Gott, du frommer Gott	oboe and organ
711	Treuer Gott, ich muß dir klagan	oboe and organ
712	Wachet auf, ruft uns die Stimme	trumpet and organ
713	Wachet auf, ruft uns die Stimme	clarino and organ
714	Wachet auf, ruft uns die Stimme	trumpet and organ
715	Wie schön leucht uns der Morgenstern	oboe and organ

== Keyboard works (Krebs-WV 8xx) ==
Krebs-WV	Composition	Notes
800	Suite in C major	Clavier-Übung, part II (publ. 1744)
801	Sonatina Prima in A minor	Clavier-Übung, part III (publ. 1744)
802	Sonatina Seconda in D major	Clavier-Übung, part III (publ. 1744)
803	Sonatina Terza in C minor	Clavier-Übung, part III (publ. 1744)
804	Sonatina Quarta in B♭ major	Clavier-Übung, part III (publ. 1744)
805	Sonatina Quinta in E♭ major	Clavier-Übung, part III (publ. 1744)
806	Sonatina Sesta in F minor	Clavier-Übung, part III (publ. 1744)
807	Suite I in D major	Six Suites from Clavier-Übung, part IV (publ. 1746)
808	Suite II in B minor	Six Suites from Clavier-Übung, part IV (publ. 1746)
809	Suite III in E♭ major	Six Suites from Clavier-Übung, part IV (publ. 1746)
810	Suite IV in C major	Six Suites from Clavier-Übung, part IV (publ. 1746)
811	Suite V in F major	Six Suites from Clavier-Übung, part IV (publ. 1746)
812	Suite VI in C minor	Six Suites from Clavier-Übung, part IV (publ. 1746)
813	Prelude I in C major	Six Preludes from Pieces, part I (publ. 1740)
814	Prelude II in D minor	Six Preludes from Pieces, part I (publ. 1740)
815	Prelude III in E minor	Six Preludes from Pieces, part I (publ. 1740)
816	Prelude IV in F major	Six Preludes from Pieces, part I (publ. 1740)
817	Prelude V in G major	Six Preludes from Pieces, part I (publ. 1740)
818	Prelude VI in A minor	Six Preludes from Pieces, part I (publ. 1740)
819	Suite in A minor (nach dem heutiger Gusto)	Pieces, part II (publ. 1741)
820	Overture in G minor (in Franzöischen Gout)	Pieces, part III (publ. 1741)
821	Concerto in G major (in Italiänischen Gusto)	Pieces, part IV (publ. 1743)
822	Partita I	Lost
823	Partita II in B♭ major	
824	Partita III	Lost
825	Partita IV in A minor	
826	Partita V	Lost
827	Partita VI in E♭ major	
827a	Partita VI in E♭ major (later version)	
828	Sonata I in A minor	Four Sonatas for solo harpsichord (publ. 1763)
829	Sonata II in D major	Four Sonatas for solo harpsichord (publ. 1763)
830	Sonata III in G minor	Four Sonatas for solo harpsichord (publ. 1763)
831	Sonata IV in B♭ major	Four Sonatas for solo harpsichord (publ. 1763)
832	Sonata I in C major	Six Keyboard Sonatas (1713)
833	Sonata II in G major	Six Keyboard Sonatas (1713)
834	Sonata III in B♭ major	Six Keyboard Sonatas (1713)
835	Sonata IV in D major	Six Keyboard Sonatas (1713)
836	Sonata V in F major	Six Keyboard Sonatas (1713)
837	Sonata VI in D minor	Six Keyboard Sonatas (1713)
838	Sonata in A minor	
839	Divertimento	
840	Concerto in A minor	
841 *	Aria di Krebs	Doubts due to stylistic issues.
842 *	Menuet	Doubtful, likely by Johann Christoph Schmügel.
843	Fugue in C major	
844	Fugue in E major	
845	Fugue in F major	
846	Fugue in F minor	
847	Fugue in G major	
848	Fugue in A minor	

== Doubtful works (Krebs-WV 9xx) ==
Krebs-WV	Composition	Notes
900 *	Ach Herr, mich armen Sünder	oboe d'amore and organ. KrebsWV 900-907, 909-910 are from an unattributed collection which bears Krebs' name in a pencilled note. Several have been attributed to Homilius, while the rest are unverified.
901 *	Allein zu dir Herr Jesu Christ	oboe d'amore and organ. See above.
902 *	Ich ruf zu dir, Herr Jesu Christ	oboe and organ. See above.
903 *	Jesus meine Zuversicht	trombone, oboe and organ. See above.
904 *	Keinen hat Gott verlassen	oboe and organ. See above.
905 *	O du allersüßeste Freude	oboe and organ. See above.
906 *	O Gott, du frommer Gott	oboe and organ. See above.
907 *	O Gott, du frommer Gott	oboe d'amore and organ. See above.
908 *	Wachet auf, ruft uns die Stimme	Fragment, possibly by August Gottfried Ritter.
909 *	Warum sollt ich mich denn grämen	oboe and organ. See above.
910 *	Wer weiß wie nahe mir mein Ende	oboe and organ. See above.

== Lost works ==
	Composition	Notes
I.	Cantata Erthönt erfreute Andachts-Lieder	See Krebs-WV 107.
II.	Motet Tröste uns Gott, unser Heiland	See Krebs-WV 153.
III.	21 Chorales	Listed in a catalog by Hoffmeister and Kühnel with no further information. Considered lost.
IV.	27 Chorales	Listed in a catalog by Breitkopf. Considered lost.
V.	Toccata	From a note in a private collection. Unknown whether this is for Krebs-WV 406 or 411, or for a previously unknown work.

== Sources ==
- Dürr, Alfred, ed. (1987). Eight Short Preludes and Fugues BWV 553–560: formerly ascribed to Johann Sebastian Bach (in German and English). Kassel: Bärenreiter. ISMN 9790006480098. BA 6497.
- Emans, Reinmar 1997. Johann Sebastian Bach, Organ Chorales of Dubious Authenticity: Thematic Catalogue. Das Institut, Göttingen, Germany.
- Emans, Reinmar (ed.) 2008. Bach: Organ Chorales from Miscellaneous Sources, Band 10 of the New Bach Edition. Bärenreiter, Kassel, Germany.
- Friedrich, Felix 2009. Krebs-Werkeverzeichnis (Krebs-WV) : Thematisch-systematisches Verzeichnis der musikalischen Werke von Johann Ludwig Krebs. Verlag Kamprad, Altenburg, Germany. ISBN 978-3-930550-59-3
- Tittel, Karl (1966). "Welche unter J. S. Bachs Namen geführten Orgelwerke sind Johann Tobias bzw. Johann Ludwig Krebs zuzuschreiben? Ein Versuch zur Lösung von Autorschaftsproblemen" [Which of the organ works for which J. S. Bach has been named as author can be ascribed to Johann Tobias or Johann Ludwig Krebs? An attempt to resolve authorship issues]. In Dürr, Alfred; Neumann, Werner (eds.). Bach-Jahrbuch 1966 [Bach Yearbook 1966]. Bach-Jahrbuch (in German). Vol. 52. Neue Bachgesellschaft. Berlin: Evangelische Verlagsanstalt. pp. 102–137. doi:10.13141/bjb.v1966 – via Qucosa.
- Weinberger, Gerhard (ed.) 1985-6. Johann Ludwig Krebs: Sämtliche Orgelwerke. Published in four volumes. Breitkopf & Härtel, Wiesbaden, Germany.
- Weinberger, Gerhard 2001-2007. Liner notes to Krebs: Sämtliche Orgelwerke, 7 CD compilation, Motette.
- Williams, Peter (2003). The Organ Music of J. S. Bach (2nd ed.). Cambridge University Press. ISBN 978-0-521-89115-8.
