= Cornelius Heinrich Dretzel =

German organist and composer (bapt. 1697–1775)

Cornelius Heinrich Dretzel (18 September 1697 (bapt.) – 7 May 1775) was a German organist and composer. He was born in Nuremberg, where he appears to have spent his whole life in various organists' posts, including:

- St. Egidien, Nuremberg 1719–1743
- St. Lorenz, Nuremberg 1743–1764
- St. Sebaldus Church, Nuremberg 1764–1775

He may have studied with J. S. Bach in Weimar (1716–1717), and his compositions reveal points of contact with Bach. They include a concerto for harpsichord solo, perhaps modelled on the Italian Concerto. A variant of the slow movement of his solo concerto Divertimento armonico was once thought to be by Bach: it was published as a prelude by Bach in the 19th-century Bach-Gesellschaft edition, and listed in the first edition of the Bach-Werke-Verzeichnis (BWV) as the first movement of BWV 897 (BWV 897/1).

== Sources ==
- Ahlgrimm, Isolde (1969). "Cornelius Heinrich Dretzel, der Autor des J. S. Bach zugeschriebenen Klavierwerkes BWV 897" [Cornelius Heinrich Dretzel, the composer of the keyboard piece BWV 897, ascribed to J. S. Bach]. In Dürr, Alfred; Neumann, Werner (eds.). Bach-Jahrbuch 1969 [Bach Yearbook 1969]. Bach-Jahrbuch (in German). Vol. 55. Neue Bachgesellschaft. Berlin: Evangelische Verlagsanstalt. pp. 67–77. doi:10.13141/bjb.v1969.
