= Max Schneider (music historian) =

German musicologist and music historian

Max Schneider (20 July 1875 – 5 May 1967) was a German music historian.

== Life ==
Born in Eisleben, Schneider studied musicology at the University of Leipzig with Hermann Kretzschmar and Hugo Riemann and composition with Salomon Jadassohn. After his time as second Kapellmeister in Halle from 1897 to 1901, he continued his studies of music history with Kretzschmar. In 1904, he moved to Berlin, where he worked from 1905 to 1915 as a "scientific assistant" at the Alte Bibliothek.

At the Royal Music Institute of Berlin, Schneider learnt orchestration and received the title of professor in 1913. In 1915, he accepted a professorship at the University of Breslau; two years later he obtained his doctorate with a dissertation on the beginnings of the basso continuo. From 1927, he was director of the Hochschule für Kirchenmusik der Evangelischen Kirche der schlesischen Oberlausitz in Breslau. In 1928, he succeeded Arnold Schering as professor for musicology at the Martin-Luther-University of Halle-Wittenberg. After 1933, Schneider was member of the organizations National Socialist Teachers League, National Socialist German Lecturers League, Nationalsozialistischer Altherrenbund, and the Reichsluftschutzbund. In December 1938 he resigned from his post as Dean of the Faculty of Philosophy, which he had held since 1936, "because of the consequences of the "Rosenberg Politic".

After 1945 he joined the Free German Trade Union Federation. He taught far beyond his Emeritus in 1950 until 1962. Furthermore he taught music history and score playing at the Staatliche Hochschule für Theater und Musik Halle founded in 1947.

Schneider took on the editorship of the Bach-Jahrbuch of the Neue Bachgesellschaft. This annual publication had been suspended during the war years and the previous editor Arnold Schering had died. The Jahrbuch covering the years 1940-1948 came out in 1947 as Volume 37 (published by Breitkopf & Härtel, Leipzig). Schneider was co-editor of the Archiv für Musikwissenschaft (1918–1927), the Händel-Jahrbuch (1955–1967), the Hallische Händel-Ausgabe (from 1955) as well as the series Musikgeschichte in Bildern (from 1961). He dealt almost exclusively with the history of music from the late 16th to the middle of the 18th century, in particular with performance practice and source material. Schneider published important studies on Johann Sebastian Bach's biography and the sources of his works and helped to rehabilitate Georg Philipp Telemann.

From 1955 to 1967 he was president of the Georg-Friedrich-Händel-Gesellschaft in Halle. In 1961 he was awarded the Handel Prize.

Schneider died in Halle at age 91. His grave is located on the Laurentius-Cemetery in Halle.
