= Anhang =

Anhang (German for annex), often abbreviated as Anh., refers to sections in publications such as the Bach-Werke-Verzeichnis (BWV), the Köchel catalogue (KV), or the Deutsch catalogue (D):

- BWV Anh.: list of lost, doubtful and spurious compositions by, or once attributed to, Johann Sebastian Bach
- D Anh. I: List of compositions by Franz Schubert (doubtful and spurious), compositions which are spuriously or doubtfully attributed to Franz Schubert
- D Anh. II: List of compositions by Franz Schubert (arrangements), arrangements by Franz Schubert, of compositions by other composers
- D Anh. III: List of compositions by Franz Schubert (copies), copies by Franz Schubert, of compositions by other composers
