= Carlo Zuccari =

Italian composer (1703–1792)

Carlo Zuccari Italian pronunciation: [ˈkarlo dˈdzukkari] (November 10, 1703 – May 3, 1792) was an Italian composer and violinist. Active during the late Baroque and early Classical music periods, Zuccari worked mainly in Milan, Olomouc, and London.

== Personal life and career ==
Zuccari was born in Casalmaggiore, Italy, a flourishing small town. He began studying the violin at a young age and demonstrated considerable talent. At the age of 19, he moved to Vienna to pursue his musical training. There, his skills garnered the attention of nobility. He eventually met the Milanese noblewoman Francesca Radaelli, an amateur singer, whom he married when he was 29.

Immediately afterward, he spent years traveling Europe to build his fame as a virtuoso, serving for a time as a Kapellmeister before eventually settling in Milan. At age 43, he published his masterpiece Sonate a Violino, e Basso ò Cembalo, Opera Prima. He also served as the director of the Accademia Filarmonica Milanese and, in 1748, became a member of the Orchestra Ducale. In 1750, he was first violinist with the orchestra of G.B. Sammartini. In 1760, he ended up in London as a member of the Opera Italiana Orchestra. There, he published a method for violin in 1762 and, in 1764, the Sonate per due Violini e Basso.

In 1778, Zuccari retired from the musical life of Milan and returned with his wife and five children to his native Casalmaggiore, where he taught music until his death.

== Works and musical style ==
Zuccari's works were mainly of the Baroque style, despite his time in the early Classical era. As a violinist, Zuccari focused on intricate musical ornamentation for sonatas that relied heavily on his expertise. His sonatas emphasized the history of music with authentic sounds, as opposed to cantatas, which were generally sung. A majority of his prominent pieces were released between the late 1740s and the mid-1760s.

His works include:

- Sonate a Violino, e Basso ò Cembalo, Opera Prima (c. 1747, Milan) — the 10th of these 12 sonatas for violin and continuo was for some time attributed to Bach (BWV Anh. 184)
- The True Method of Playing at Adagio (1762)
- Four Manuscripts (1764, London)

- Concerti per Concertato Violino e strumenti
- Solo per Violino e Basso
- Sonata per flauto solo e basso
- Sonate per violoncello

- 12 Trio Sonatas (1765, Milan)
