= Flute Sonata in C major, BWV 1033 =

I. Andante – Presto

II. Allegro

III. Adagio

IV. Menuett I and II
Performed by Alex Murray (traverso) and Martha Goldstein (harpsichord)

The Sonata in C major for flute and basso continuo (BWV 1033) is a sonata in 4 movements. It is attributed to Johann Sebastian Bach in the manuscript, which is in the hand of his son Carl Philipp Emanuel Bach and has been dated to about 1731, although scholars question the attribution

The movements are:

1. Andante – Presto
2. Allegro
3. Adagio
4. Menuet 1 – Menuet 2

Jeanne Swack notes that the first menuet "is related to the first in a set of variations in a concerto for oboe, obligato cembalo and doubling cello by the Merseburg composer Christoph Förster"; this suggests that the movements of BWV 1033 "may have had a disparate origin, as does the sudden appearance of an obbligato cembalo part solely for that movement."

The basso continuo can be provided by a variety of instruments. For example, in complete Bach recordings, Stephen Preston on Brilliant Classics (originally recorded by CRD UK) is accompanied by harpsichord and viola da gamba while on Hänssler Classic Jean-Claude Gérard solos without basso continuo.
