= Johann Christoph Altnickol =

German organist, bass singer, and composer (1720–1759)

Johann Christoph Altnickol, or Altnikol, (baptised 1 January 1720, buried 25 July 1759) was a German organist, bass singer, and composer. He was a student, copyist and son-in-law of Johann Sebastian Bach.

== Biography ==
Altnikol was born in Berna bei Seidenberg, Oberlausitz, and first educated at the Lauban Lyceum in 1733. He was employed as a singer and assistant organist at St Maria Magdalena, Breslau, between 1740 and 1744. He began studying theology at the University of Leipzig from March 1744, after being granted four thalers as a viaticum in January of that year. From Michaelmas 1745 he sang as a bass in Johann Sebastian Bach's choirs (asserted by Bach in May 1747 when Altnickol claimed a grant of 12 thalers in April/May 1747 for the work), something he should not have been allowed to do as a university student. He also served as a scribe for Bach, copying for example The Well-Tempered Clavier. He was recommended by W. F. Bach as the successor to his post at Dresden in April 1746, with the assertion that he had studied keyboard and composition with his father, but was not awarded the appointment.

He was appointed as organist and schoolmaster at Niederwiesa, near Greiffenberg, Silesia, in January 1748, after Bach testified that he was a satisfactory student. In September of that year, he moved to a post at St Wenzel, Naumburg, after another recommendation from Bach; the council unanimously agreed to appoint him before they had received his formal application. He married Bach's daughter Elisabeth Juliane Friderica in January 1749; their first son was born in October of the same year and named Johann Sebastian, but died in infancy. Forkel wrote that Bach dictated his last chorale prelude (Vor deinen Thron tret ich hiermit, BWV 668) to Altnickol on his deathbed, although this manuscript did not survive.

Johann Sebastian Bach died in 1750. One of his last students, Johann Gottfried Müthel, continued his studies with Altnikol, who was also involved in the marketing of the Art of Fugue which had been initiated by Bach's heirs. Altnikol was unsuccessful in an application for a post at the Johanniskirche, Zittau, in 1753, along with W. F. Bach. He taught trumpeter J. Ernst Altenburg in 1757, and is known to have directed a pasticcio passion cantata Wer ist der, so von Edom kömmt, featuring music by C. H. Graun, Bach and Telemann, as well as Bach's St Matthew Passion. He was succeeded by Johann Friedrich Gräbner at Naumburg upon his death in 1759. Shortly afterwards his widow returned to Leipzig with her two daughters. She received allowance from C. P. E. Bach, her half-brother, and died on 24 August 1781.

== Compositions ==
Many of his works have been lost.

=== Vocal ===
- Missa in D minor (Kyrie and Gloria)
- Sanctus (2 settings), 1748

==== Cantatas ====
- Frohlocket und jauchzet in prächtigen Chören
- Ich lebe und ihr sollt auch leben

==== Motets ====
- Befiehl du deine Wege
- Nun danket alle Gott (SSATB), BWV Anh. 164, partly based on BWV 386.

=== Keyboard ===
- Sonata in C major
- 7 dances
- Ricercar a 4
