= Johann Bernhard Bach the Younger =

Johann Bernhard Bach
- Birth name: Johann Bernhard Bach
- Born: 24 November 1700; Ohrdruf, Germany
- Died: 12 June 1743 (aged 42); Ohrdruf, Germany
- Occupation(s): Composer, Organist
- Instrument: Organ

Johann Bernhard Bach (the younger; to distinguish him from an older family member with the same name) (24 November 1700 – 12 June 1743) was a nephew of Johann Sebastian Bach. He was a German composer and organist.

Johann Bernhard was born in and he died in Ohrdruf. In 1721 he followed his father, Johann Christoph Bach, in the post of organist at St. Michael in Ohrdruf.

== Sources ==
- This article was translated from the German Wikipedia.
