= Mein Odem ist schwach, BWV 222 =

Church cantata by Johann Ernst Bach II

Mein Odem ist schwach (My breath is weak), BWV 222, is a church cantata composed by Johann Ernst Bach II. It had been accredited to Johann Sebastian Bach. The intended occasion and the librettist are unknown.

== Scoring and structure ==
The cantata is scored for soprano, alto and bass soloists, SATB choir, two violins, viola and organ.

It is six movements:

1. Aria (bass): Mein Odem ist schwach
2. Aria (alto): O seid mir sehnsuchtsvoll geküßt
3. Chorus: Unser Wandel ist im Himmel
4. Chorale: Wie du mir, Herr, befohlen hast
5. Chorale: Lass mich nur, Herr, wie Simeon
6. Chorus: Wir aber sind getrost und haben vielmehr Lust

== Motet Unser Wandel ist im Himmel ==
The motet Unser Wandel ist im Himmel, BWV Anh. 165 is derived from movements 3, 4 and 6 of the cantata Mein Odem ist schwach. As for the cantata its authorship is attributed to Johann Ernst Bach II.

== Recording ==
- Alsfelder Vokalensemble / Steintor Barock Bremen, Wolfgang Helbich. The Apocryphal Bach Cantatas. CPO, 1991.
