= Johann Ernst Bach II =

German composer (1722–1777)

Johann Ernst Bach
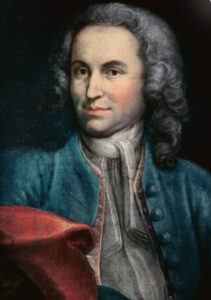
- Possible portrait of Bach.
- Born: 28 January 1722; Eisenach, Saxe-Weimar
- Died: 1 September 1777 (aged 55); Eisenach, Saxe-Weimar
- Era: Classical
- Known for: Composition
- Father: Johann Bernhard Bach

Johann Ernst Bach (28 January 1722 – 1 September 1777) was a German composer of the Classical Period. He was the son of Johann Bernhard Bach.

== Life ==
Johann Ernst Bach, the son of Johann Bernhard Bach, was born in Eisenach and baptized on 30 January 1722. In his early life, Bach studied at the Lateinschule in Eisenach from 1732 to 1735. On 16 January 1737 he entered the Thomasschule in Leipzig, where he then became a pupil of his uncle Johann Sebastian Bach. Being a student of J.S Bach, he assisted his uncle in copying his music. During the years of 1740 to 1741, he studied law at the Universität Eisenach. He returned to Eisenach in 1741 or 1742 and filled in for his ailing father as a choirmaster and organist. In 1748, he became his father's official assistant, and in 1749 he was his successor. He continued to practice law as well. In 1756, he was appointed Hofkapellmeister "in view of his well known skill and musical knowledge". Due to the fusion of the courts, he frequently travelled between Weimar, Gotha, and Eisenach; during this time, he worked with Georg Benda on the reorganization of the Hofkapelle. When it was dissolved in 1758, after the death of Duke Ernst August, he retained his title and took over duties in the administration of the ducal finances. He died on 1 September 1777.

== Style ==
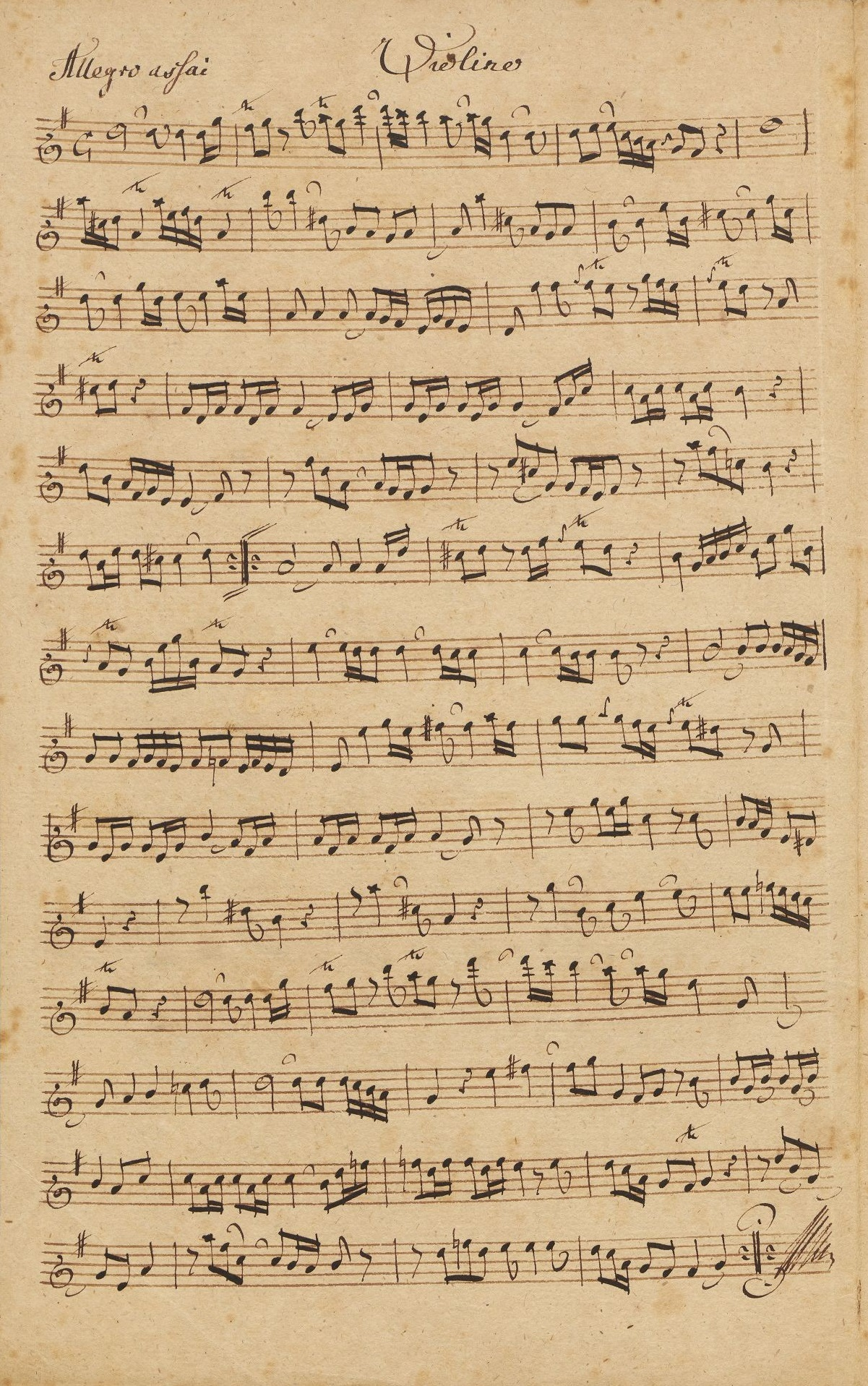
Page from Sonata per il clavicembalo col violino, 18th century, by Bach

As a composer, Johann Ernst was abreast of the stylistic innovations of his time, although he did not exclude contrapuntal writings. His works are often highly dramatic and full of effects. His songs depend on the past tradition of Görner, Gräfe, and Mizler; he often wrote galant melodies filled with lively basses and elaborate accompaniments. A picture of his perceptions of music can be deduced from the introduction he wrote to Jacob Adlung's Anleitung zu der musikalischen Gelahrtheit (1758). In it he generally criticizes the declining trend of the religious music of his time and promotes the works of Johann Sebastian Bach, Georg Philipp Telemann and Gottfried Heinrich Stelzel. His distaste for secular music can be seen through his surviving compositions, most of which are sacred. It has been widely accepted that Bach had private lessons with his uncle, which likely had an influence on his own composition.

== Works ==
=== Vocal ===
- O Seele, deren Sehnen (Passion oratorio), 1764
- 2 Passions, lost

=== Sacred cantatas ===
- Ach Herr, strafe mich nicht
- Alles was Odem hat
- Auf und säumt euch nicht, ihr Frommen
- Der Herr ist nahe bei denen, for the funeral of Duke Ernst August Constantin
- Der Meer ist nahe
- Die Liebe Gottes ist ausgegossen
- Ein feste Burg ist unser Gott
- Herzlich lieb hab ich dich, o Herr, on Schalling's hymn
- Kein Stündlein geht dahin
- Kommt herzu, lasset uns frohlocken
- Magnificat
- Mass on Es wolle Gott uns gnädig sein
- Mein Odem ist schwach, BWV 222, choral movements also as motet, Unser Wandel ist im Himmel, BWV Anh. 165
- Meine Seele erhebet den Herrn (i)
- Meine Seele erhebet den Herrn (ii)
- Meine Seele erhebet den Herrn (iii)
- Nach dir, Herr, verlanget mich
- Sei willkommen, mächtiger Herrscher
- Singet dem Herrn ein neues Lied
- So gehst du nun, mein Jesu, hin
- Straf mich nicht in deinem Zorn, on the hymn by Albinus
- Wenn Donnerwolken über dir sich türmen (Das Vertrauen der Christen auf Gott)
- Wünschet Jerusalem Glück
- Wie der Hirsch schreiet, lost
- Lobe den Herrn, meine Seele, lost
- several other lost cantatas (for the annual cycle 1766)

=== Other sacred works ===
- Aus der Tiefen, motet, SATB
- Mein Odem ist schwach, motet, SATB
- Unser Wandel ist im Himmel (= bwv Anh. 165), motet, SATB
- 11 motets, ARk [? by C. P. E. Bach, H865]

=== Secular cantatas ===
- Gesegneten Auftritt, for birthday of Duke Friedrich of Saxe-Gotha, 1756, lost
- Wer sagt mir doch, was für Entzücken, lost
- Sammlung auserlesener Fabeln.
  - part 1, Nuremberg, 1749
  - part 2, unpublished
- Lächerliche Mammonshüter (An die Geizigen), 1770

=== Instrumental ===
- Sinfonia in B
- Other lost sinfonias
- 3 Sonaten (Kbd/Vn), part 1, Eisenach, 1770
- 3 Sonaten (Kbd/Vn), part 2, Eisenach, 1772
- Sonata in A (Fl/Vn/Bc)

==== Keyboard works ====
- Sonata in G, harpsichord
- Sonata in F, harpsichord
- Sonata in G, harpsichord
- Sonata in A, harpsichord
- Fantasia and fugue in D
- Fantasia and fugue in A
- Fantasia and fugue in F
- Chorale Valet will ich dir geben

== Sources ==
- H. Kühn: Vier Organisten Eisenachs aus Bachischem Geschlecht, Bach in Thüringen, 1950
- C. Oefner: Die Musikerfamilie Bach in Eisenach, Eisenach, 1984
- H. Max: Verwandtes im Werk Bachs, seiner Schüler und Söhne, 1986
- E. Odrich and P. Wollny: Die Briefkonzepte des Johann Elias Bach, 2000
- C. Wolff: The New Grove Bach Family, 1983
