= Bach (journal) =

BACH: Journal of the Riemenschneider Bach Institute
- Discipline: Johann Sebastian Bach, Baroque music
- Language: English
- Edited by: Mary Greer, Laura Kennelly (associate)

Publication details
- History: 1970-present
- Publisher: Riemenschneider Bach Institute, Baldwin Wallace University (United States)
- Frequency: Biannual

Standard abbreviations
- ISO 4: Bach

Indexing
- ISSN: 0005-3600
- LCCN: 79646834
- JSTOR: 00053600
- OCLC no.: 2092949

Links
- Journal homepage

Bach is a biannual peer-reviewed academic journal published by the Riemenschneider Bach Institute at Baldwin Wallace University. It covers the study of Johann Sebastian Bach and Baroque music. The journal was established in 1970, and the 2016–2017 guest editor is Mary Greer (Cambridge, Massachusetts, U.S.).
