= Reißt euch los, bekränkte Sinnen, BWV 224 =

Church cantata

Reißt euch los, bekränkte Sinnen (You are torn loose, afflicted sinners), BWV 224, is a cantata, possibly by Carl Philipp Emanuel Bach or Johann Sebastian Bach. It was composed around 1732–1734 for an unknown occasion. The author of the text is unknown, and there are only 30 measures of the aria for soprano extant, copied by C. P. E. Bach.
