= Wer sucht die Pracht, wer wünscht den Glanz, BWV 221 =

Cantata by an unknown composer

Wer sucht die Pracht, wer wünscht den Glanz (Who seeks the splendour, who desires the radiance), BWV 221, (Note: "BWV" is Bach-Werke-Verzeichnis, a thematic catalogue of Bach's works.) is a cantata by an unknown composer, formerly attributed to Johann Sebastian Bach. The event for which it was written is also unknown.

== Scoring and structure ==
The cantata is scored for tenor and bass soloists, bassoon, three violins, viola, cello and organ.

It has nine movements:

1. Sinfonia
2. Recitative (tenor): Wer sucht die Pracht, wer wünscht den Glanz
3. Duet aria (tenor and bass): Seele suchst du dein Vergnügen
4. Recitative (bass): Umsonst ist hier die Kunst, nur Schatten
5. Aria (tenor): Felsenfest muß der Grund von Herzen Stehen
6. Recitative (bass): So ist denn das dein einziges Bemühen
7. Aria (bass): Entfernet euch, Vergänglichkeiten
8. Recitative (tenor): O schöner Schluß, o wohl
9. Duet aria (tenor and bass): Der Himmel selbst zerfällt, sein Glanz

== Recording ==
- Alsfelder Vokalensemble / Steintor Barock Bremen, Wolfgang Helbich. The Apocryphal Bach Cantatas. CPO, 1991.
