= Annex =

Annex or annexe may refer to:

== Places ==
- The Annex, a neighbourhood in downtown Toronto, Ontario, Canada
- The Annex, New Haven, a neighborhood of New Haven, Connecticut, United States
- Annex, Oregon, a census-designated place in the United States
- RELLIS Campus, a satellite campus of Texas A&M University in Bryan, Texas, US; formerly named the Research Annex, and commonly known as the Riverside Annex or simply the Annex

== Other uses ==
- Annexation
- Annex (comics), a Marvel Comics character
- Addendum or appendix at the end of a document
- The Annex, Grand Cayman, a football ground in George Town, Cayman Islands
- "Annex", B-side of the 1980 Orchestral Manoeuvres in the Dark single "Enola Gay"
- Annex, an early name for the Bangkok Adventist Hospital
- Wing (building), a part of a building subordinate to the main structure
