= Johann Bernhard Bach =

German composer

Johann Bernhard Bach (23 May 1676 – 11 June 1749) was a German composer, and second cousin of J. S. Bach.

== Life ==
Johann Bernhard Bach was born in Erfurt, Electorate of Mainz, in 1676, in the house named "Zu den drei Rosen" (The Three Roses) on Junkersand Street, and was baptized on 25 November 1676 in Erfurt's Kaufmannskirche (Merchant's Church). He (like his younger brother Johann Christoph, born in 1685) received his early musical tuition from his father, Johann Aegidius Bach. After attending the Schola Mercatorum at Erfurt, he entered Erfurt's major secondary school at that time, the Ratsgymnasium. As early as 1695, at the age of 18, he became the organist at the Kaufmannskirche. In 1699, he moved to Magdeburg where he was appointed organist for St Catharine's Church. In 1703, John William III, Duke of Saxe-Eisenach called him to Eisenach to serve as harpsichordist at the ducal court. In Eisenach, he also became the organist at St George's Church, succeeding his uncle Johann Christoph Bach.

From 1708 to 1712, Johann Bernhard Bach worked together with Georg Philipp Telemann who held, first, the position of the leader of the violin section, and, from August 1709, that of a conductor (Kapellmeister) at Eisenach's ducal orchestra.

On 6 August 1716, Johann Bernhard Bach married Johanna Sophia Siefer. Three children were born into the family.

In 1741, the ducal orchestra was dissolved, which meant that Johann Bernhard continued to work exclusively as choirmaster and organist, until his death, apparently still receiving the ducal allowance of 100 Thalers per year.

Johann Bernhard kept a life-long friendship with his famous cousin Johann Sebastian Bach. In 1715, he acted as godfather for Johann Sebastian's son Johann Gottfried Bernhard, whilst Johann Sebastian became godfather to Johann Bernhard's eldest son Johann Ernst in 1722. This latter was to succeed his father Johann Bernhard as organist at St George's Church in Eisenach.

Bach died in 1749 at the age of 73

== Work ==
Most of his musical output has been lost, but amongst his surviving music there are four orchestral suites. It is known that J.S. Bach had individual parts prepared for performance by his orchestra.

His musical style has been described as being similar to that of Telemann.

The surviving orchestral suites (overtures) are as follows:

- Suite No. 1 in G minor
- Suite No. 2 in G major
- Suite No. 3 in E minor
- Suite No. 4 in D major

They are thought to have been written before 1730.

Surviving keyboard music:

- Fantasia in C minor (originally thought to have been composed by J.S. Bach as BWV 919)
- Chaconne in A major
- Chaconne in B-flat major
- Chaconne in G major
- Chorales for organ
  - "Du Friedefürst, Herr Jesu Christ"
  - "Nun freut euch lieben Christen g'mein"
  - "Vom Himmel hoch da komm ich her"

Two fugues composed by Johann Bernhard Bach also survive.

== Discography ==
- "Ouvertures", Johann Bernhard Bach : L'Achéron / François Joubert-Caillet, Ricercar - "Orchestral Suites - Johann Bernhard Bach", Johann Bernhard Bach, Thüringer Bach Collegium, audite Musikproduktion
