= Christoph Förster =

German composer (1693–1745)

Christoph Förster (30 November 1693 – 6 December 1745) was a German composer of the baroque period.

== Life ==
Christoph Förster (spelled Johann Christoph Friedrich in his death register) was born in Bibra, Thuringia as the son of council treasurer Christian Förster who gave him his first musical instruction in singing and playing on various instruments. He began organ studies with local organist Johann Philipp Pitzler, with whom he traveled. In 1710 he met Johann David Heinichen in Weissenfels, who at the time was working as a lawyer. With Heinichen, he took lessons in general bass and also began studying composition. When Heinichen went to Italy, Förster moved to Merseburg where he continued his studies with the Kapellmeister and court organist Georg Friedrich Kaufmann. Later, in 1717 he was employed as a chamber musician in the Sachsen-Merseburg Hofkapelle where he played second violin to Johann Gottlieb Graun, whom he later superseded as Konzertmeister.

In 1723, Förster traveled to Prague with his employer for the coronation of Charles VII of Bohemia. In Prague, he made the acquaintance of the Viennese court musicians Fux, Caldara, Conti and Piani and also took part in a performance of Fux's Constanza e Fortezza and performed in a concert as a harpsichord soloist and violinist for a Dutch ambassador.

He continued to serve at his post in Merseburg until the Hofkapelle was dissolved in 1738 following the death of the Duke Moritz Wilhelm.

At the birthday of Frederick Anton, Prince of Schwarzburg-Rudolstadt he played as a soloist under the leadership of Kapellmeister Johann Graf. Still without a fixed position, he applied for the position of vice-kapellmeister in Rudolstadt which he received on 3 May 1743 without a fixed salary. He died there two years later in 1745.

Throughout his life, Förster maintained numerous contacts with other musicians. Most notably, he is known to have subscribed to two of Telemann's publications of the 1730s; Tafelmusik and the Paris quartets. It was Telemann who published Förster's Sei Duetti, Op. 1 in Paris in 1737.

Förster was proficient in the Italian style of composition, which he learned from Heinichen and from his subsequent trips to Leipzig and Dresden (1719), and then Prague (1723). This is evident in his wealth of orchestral and chamber music, much of which was probably composed for performance at the Merseburg court. During his time in Merseburg he was also required to compose Italian cantatas, and purportedly also learned Italian for this purpose. Although there are several Italian cantatas listed in Breitkopf's thematic catalogue, few, if any, of these pieces have survived.

== Works ==
Christoph Förster appears to have been a very prolific composer, however as most of his surviving manuscripts are signed only "Förster", it is possible that some pieces have been misattributed. Works which are likely to be by Christoph Förster are listed below.

- Approximately 50 concerti for oboe, violin, flute, oboe d'amore, horn, or keyboard with the accompaniment of strings and continuo
- 3 concerti for oboe, violin, strings and basso continuo
- Concerto in D major for 2 flutes, 2 oboes, 2 bassoons, 2 horns, strings, continuo
- Concerto in D major for 2 oboes, 3 trumpets, timpani, strings, continuo
- Concerto à 5 in G major for 3 oboes and 2 bassoons
- Concerto à 6 in C major for 5 oboes and bassoon
- Approximately 15 sinfonias
- Numerous trio sonatas
- 3 sonatas for violin and basso continuo
- Sonata in C minor for oboe and basso continuo
- Approximately 50 sacred cantatas for solo voices, choir and orchestra
- 1 Mass

=== Lost works ===
The following pieces are listed in Breitkopf's thematic catalogue unless otherwise stated.

- Flute Concerto in F major
- Flute Concerto in G major
- Flute Concerto in A major
- Concerto in F major for flauto piccolo
- Oboe Concerto in B♭ major
- Oboe Concerto in B♭ major
- Concerto for flute and oboe in D major
- Concerto for oboe d'amore and violino piccolo in A major
- Violin Concerto in D major
- Violin Concerto in D major
- Violin Concerto in B♭ major
- Violin Concerto in B♭ major
- Violin Concerto in G major
- Violin Concerto in A major
- Violin Concerto in E♭ major
- Violin Concerto in E♭ major
- Concerto in F major for violoncello piccolo
- Harpsichord Concerto in G major
- Ouverture in A major for 2 flutes, strings and continuo
- Ouverture in E♭ major for violin, strings, 2 horns, and continuo
- Ouverture in B♭ major for violin, 2 flutes, strings and continuo
- Ouverture in D major for 2 oboes, strings and continuo
- Ouverture in B♭ major for 2 oboes, 2 bassoons, strings and continuo
- Ouverture in E major for 2 horns, strings and continuo
- Partita a 6 in D major for 2 flutes, strings and continuo
- Partita a 5 in D major for 2 flutes, 2 horns and bassoon
- Flute sonata in E minor
- Violin sonata in C major
- Sonata in A major for violoncelo piccolo
- 10 Sinfonias
- Cantata Inimica d'amore for soprano, trumpet, strings, 2 oboes and continuo
- Cantata Zeffiretti che... for soprano, strings and continuo
- Cantata Clori, sei tutta bella, for soprano, strings and continuo
- Cantata Vieni ò morte for soprano, strings and continuo
- Cantata Zeffiretto for soprano, strings and continuo
- Cantata Sei gentile for soprano, strings and continuo
