= Arnold Schering =

German musicologist (1877–1841)

Arnold Schering (2 April 1877 in Breslau, German Empire – 7 March 1941 in Berlin) was a German musicologist.

He grew up in Dresden as the son of an art publisher. He learned violin at the Annengymnasium from which he graduated in 1896. Thereafter he studied violin at the Berlin School of Music under Joseph Joachim. From 1898 until 1902 he studied music in Berlin and Leipzig and wrote his dissertation on the instrumental concertos of Antonio Vivaldi (in German, Geschichte des Instrumentalkonzertes bei Antonio Vivaldi) and this work was influential in resurrecting the music of this composer. In 1907 he made his habilitation and was made a professor of music in 1915. In 1920 Schering gathered evidence that composer Johann Sebastian Bach usually used 12 singers in his cantatas and other vocal works. This insight eventually became influential in the early music movement. From 1928 onward he taught as a professor of musicology in Berlin.

After the Nazis rose to power, Schering became a member of the National Socialist Teachers League and the executive council of the Reichsmusikkammer. Until 1936 he served as president of the German Society for Musicology (until 1933 the German Music Society), which was transformed according to Nazi principles: "The employment of young Nazis was encouraged, but Alfred Einstein (1880–1952) was forced to resign from the editorship of the Journal of Musicology, which he had led since its first appearance in 1918. The "Führerprinzip" followed, especially in 1936 or 1937 under Ludwig Schiedermair (1876–1957), who succeeded him as president".

In January 1934, Schering delivered a lecture at the German Society for Education about "The Germanic in German music" In the same year appeared his book "Beethoven in a New Interpretation" in which he parallels in the works of Beethoven scenes from Shakespeare's plays, and where Schering put forward the bold claim that this formal design along the line of Shakespeare scenes was intentional. Also in the same year he wrote an article in the Journal for Musicology where he characterized Beethoven's famous 5th symphony as a "Symphony of National Rising," much in the sense of the rising of the National Socialist regime. Finally in 1936, he wrote, in Beethoven and Poetry, "If a brutal, sensual, and to us, racially-foreign music threatens to alienate us from the insoluble relationship between high music and high art, it is in Beethoven we can once again make a new ideal covenant."

In August 1940 he took leave from his work due to illness. He died the following year and was buried in the Friedhof Heerstraße. The location of his grave is unknown.
