= Werner Neumann (musicologist) =

German musicologist

- Born: 21 January 1905; Königstein, German Empire
- Died: 24 April 1991 (aged 86); Leipzig, Germany
- Education: Conservatory of Leipzig; University of Leipzig
- Occupation: Musicologist
- Organizations: Bach-Archiv Leipzig; Neue Bach-Ausgabe

Werner Neumann (21 January 1905, Königstein – 24 April 1991, Leipzig) was a German musicologist. He founded the Bach-Archiv Leipzig on 20 November 1950 and was a principal editor of the Neue Bach-Ausgabe, the second edition of the complete works of Johann Sebastian Bach.

== Professional career ==
Neumann studied at the Conservatory of Leipzig from 1928 to 1930, and at the University of Leipzig from 1928 to 1933, besides Musicology also Philosophy, Psychology and Romance studies. He wrote his thesis in 1938 on Bach's choral fugue, "J. S. Bachs Chorfuge. Ein Beitrag zur Kompositionstechnik Bachs". He worked as a teacher from 1934 to 1940 and served the military for five years. From 1945 to 1950 he worked as a freelance teacher, writer on music and teacher at the Musikhochschule Leipzig.

After the Deutsche Bachfeier 1950, the bicentennial of Bach, he founded the Bach-Archiv Leipzig for documentation and research, which he presided until 1973, achieving international recognition.

From 1953 to 1974 Neumann was, together with Alfred Dürr, editor of the Bach-Jahrbuch (Bach almanach), writing several contributions himself. He started in 1951 to lead the East German section of the Neue Bach-Ausgabe, the second complete edition of Bach's works, whereas Dürr was the director of the West German section. Neumann added several volumes of cantatas to the project.

In 1974 Neumann became a member of the Sächsische Akademie der Wissenschaften, the Saxonian Academy of Sciences.

== Awards ==
- 1954 Title "Professor" in recognition of his research of Bach and his merits as the director of the Bach-Archiv Leipzig
- 1968 Vaterländischer Verdienstorden in Bronze
- 1973 National Prize of East Germany
- 1981 Vaterländischer Verdienstorden in Silver

== Selected publications ==
- Johann Sebastian Bachs Chorfuge, 1938, 1950
- Handbuch der Kantaten J. S. Bachs, 1947 (Handbook of the Bach cantatas)
- Katechismus der Musik (Lobe-Neumann), 1949
- Auf den Lebenswegen J. S. Bachs, 1953
- J. S. Bachs sämtliche Kantantentexte, 1956, 1967 (complete texts of the Bach cantatas)
- Bach-Dokumente, volume 1–4 (Neumann-Schulze), 1963 to 1979
- Bach, Eine Bildbiographie (Bach and His World (Pictorial Biography)), 1961
- Das kleine Bachbuch, 1971 and 1985
- Sämtliche von J. S. Bach vertonte Texte, 1974 (complete texts composed by Bach)
- Neue Bach-Ausgabe, 1954 to 1969 (cantatas' music volumes and critical reviews)
- Faksimile-Reihe Bachscher Werke und Schriftstücke (facsimiles of Bach's works and documents)

Neumann wrote liner notes, articles for magazines, reviews, essays, music editions.
