= Neue Bachgesellschaft =

German organization dedicated to J.S. Bach

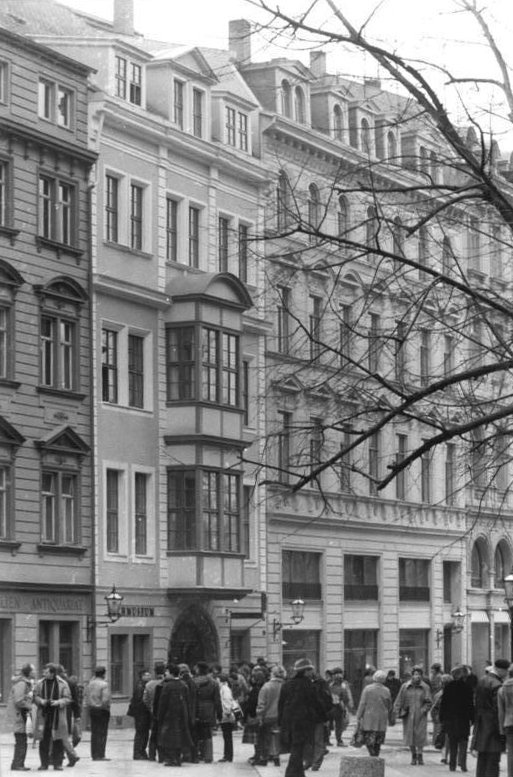
The Bosehaus in Leipzig, headquarters of the New Bach Society and the Bach-Archiv Leipzig

The Neue Bachgesellschaft, or New Bach Society, is an organisation based in Leipzig, Germany, devoted to the music of the composer Johann Sebastian Bach. It was founded in 1900 as the successor to the Bach Gesellschaft, which between 1850 and 1900 produced a complete edition of Bach's works, publishing many pieces for the first time. On completion of these collected works (the Bach-Ausgabe), the original society dissolved itself.

The new society approved three enduring projects:

- the annual edition of a Bach-Jahrbuch (Bach yearbook)
- biannual (today: annual) Bachfeste (Bach festivals). The venues of the Bachfest have mainly been in Germany, but the 2012 Festival had an international dimension, being held in Görlitz-Zgorzelec on the German-Polish border.
- the founding of a Bach museum. In 1907 the society opened the first museum dedicated to Bach at Eisenach, the town where he was born. This Bachhaus is managed by the Bachhaus Eisenach gemeinnützige GmbH, a registered charitable company, with the New Bach Society as its sole associate.

The society has not been directly involved in publishing scores in the way that its predecessor was. However, in 1950 it recommended that the second complete edition of Bach's music be undertaken, the Neue Bach-Ausgabe (NBA, in English: New Bach Edition). The project was a joint venture of musicologists in Göttingen, West Germany, and Leipzig, East Germany, in order to stress that the common cultural heritage was indivisible.
