= Siehe, ich will viel Fischer aussenden, BWV 88 =

Church cantata by Johann Sebastian Bach

Siehe, ich will viel Fischer aussenden
- BWV 88
- Church cantata by Johann Sebastian Bach
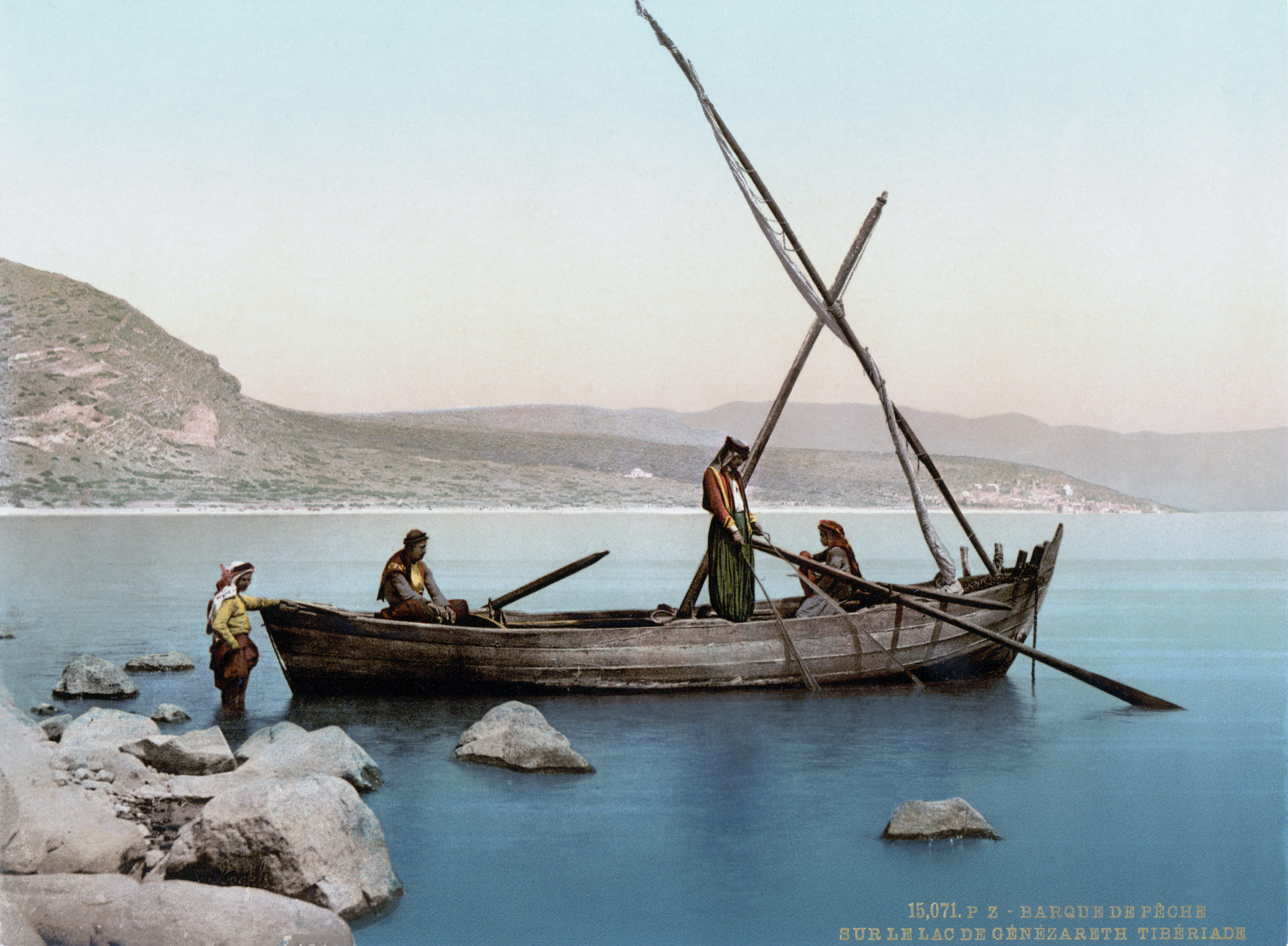
- Fisherman in the Lake of Gennesaret, where Jesus called his disciples (1890–1900)
- Occasion: Fifth Sunday after Trinity
- Chorale: "Wer nur den lieben Gott läßt walten" by Georg Neumark
- Performed: 21 July 1726: Leipzig
- Movements: seven
- Vocal: SATB soloists and choir
- Instrumental: 2 horns; 2 oboes d'amore; taille; 2 violins; viola; continuo

Johann Sebastian Bach composed the church cantata Siehe, ich will viel Fischer aussenden (Behold, I will send out many fishers), BWV 88 in Leipzig for the fifth Sunday after Trinity within the liturgical year and first performed it on 21 July 1726.

Bach composed the cantata after several complete cantata cycles written in Leipzig for the occasions of the liturgical year. The cantata text resembles works which his second cousin Johann Ludwig Bach set to music. Based on the prescribed gospel reading of the great catch of fish, an unknown librettist based his poetry on quotations from the Old Testament in the opening movement and the New Testament as the central movement, and closed it by the final stanza of Georg Neumark's hymn "Wer nur den lieben Gott läßt walten". The cantata is structured in seven movements in two parts (three and four movements), to be performed before and after the sermon. It is scored for an intimate ensemble of four vocal soloists, a choir only in the chorale, two horns, two oboes d'amore, taille, strings and continuo. The central movement is composed as a biblical scene, with the Evangelist introducing Jesus sending Peter, a fisherman, to "fish" men.

== History and words ==
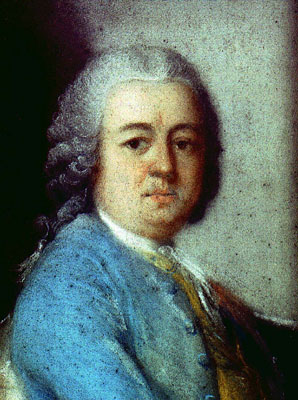
Portrait of Johann Ludwig Bach

Bach composed the cantata in Leipzig for the Fifth Sunday after Trinity. The prescribed readings for the Sunday were from the First Epistle of Peter, 1 Peter 3:8–15 "Sanctify the Lord God in your hearts", and from the Gospel of Luke, Luke 5:1–11, Peter's great catch of fish. The text of this cantata and six others is similar in structure and content to cantatas texts set by Johann Ludwig Bach, his second cousin. The theme is derived from the gospel. A related verse of Jeremiah (Jeremiah 16:16) opens the cantata. The prophecy referred originally to the return from the captivity in Babylon. The central movement, opening the second part to be performed after the sermon, is the quotation of verse 10 from the gospel. The cantata is closed by the final stanza of Georg Neumark's hymn "Wer nur den lieben Gott läßt walten" (1641). This chorale had served as the base for Bach's chorale cantata for the same occasion in 1724, Wer nur den lieben Gott läßt walten, BWV 93, part of his second annual cycle.

Bach led the first performance of the cantata on 21 July 1726.

== Music ==
=== Scoring and structure ===
The cantata is structured in two parts to be performed before and after the sermon, the first part in three solo movements, the second in three solo movements and a closing chorale. It is scored for four vocal soloists (soprano (S), alto (A), tenor (T) and bass (B)), a four-part choir SATB only in the chorale, two horns (Co), two oboes d'amore (Oa), taille (Ot), two violins (Vl), viola (Va), and basso continuo (Bc). The duration is given as 22 minutes. The autograph title page reads: "Domin. 5 post Trinit. / Siehe, ich will viel Fischer aussenden, / a / 4 Voci / 2 Corni / 3 Hautb. d'Amour / 2 Viol. / Viola / e / Cont. / di / J.S.Bach."

In the following table of the movements, the scoring follows the Neue Bach-Ausgabe. The keys and time signatures are taken from Alfred Dürr, using the symbols for common time (4/4) and alla breve (2/2). The instruments are shown separately for winds and strings, while the continuo, playing throughout, is not shown.

Movements of Siehe, ich will viel Fischer aussenden – Part 1
No.	Title	Text	Type	Vocal	Winds	Strings	Key	Time
1	Siehe, ich will viel Fischer aussenden; Und darnach will ich viel Jäger aussenden	Jeremiah 16:16	Basso solo	B	2Oa Ot; 2Co 2Oa Ot	2Vl Va	D major; G major	6/8
2	Wie leichtlich könnte doch der Höchste uns entbehren	anon.	Recitative	T				common time
3	Nein, Gott ist allezeit geflissen	anon.	Aria	T	2Oa	2Vl Va	E minor	3/8

Movements of Siehe, ich will viel Fischer aussenden, BWV 88 – Part II
No.	Title	Text	Type	Vocal	Winds	Strings	Key	Time
4	Jesus sprach zu Simon: Fürchte dich nicht	anon.	Arioso	T B		2Vl Va	G major; D major	3/4
5	Beruft Gott selbst, so muss der Segen	anon.	Duet aria	S A	2Oa	2Vl Va	A major	cut time
6	Was kann dich denn in deinem Wandel schrecken	anon.	Recitative	S				
7	Sing, bet und geh auf Gottes Wegen	Neumark	Chorale	SATB	2Ob Ot	2Vl Va	B minor	common time

=== Movements ===
==== 1 ====
The opening movement, "Siehe, ich will viel Fischer aussenden" (Behold, I will send out many fishers), is given to the bass solo, possibly because Jeremiah has God speak in the first person. The music follows the text in two sections, as in a motet. Probably, therefore, Bach avoided the title aria and wrote basso solo instead. Some cantatas on texts by Christiana Mariana von Ziegler from the second annual cycle begin in a similar way with a bible quotation, of Jesus saying "Ich bin ein guter Hirt" (I am a Good Shepherd, BWV 85), "Es ist euch gut, daß ich hingehe" (It is good for you that I leave, BWV 108), and Jesus saying "Bisher habt ihr nichts gebeten in meinem Namen" (Until now you have asked for nothing in My name, BWV 87).

The two sections reflect two concepts mentioned in the text: Fischer (fishermen) and Jäger (hunters). The first section paints a seascape in an undulating figuration of the strings with the oboes in 6/8 time on a pedal point. Bach "represents the movement of waves and water", described as a barcarolle by John Eliot Gardiner, the conductor of the Bach Cantata Pilgrimage in 2000. The voice presents the text several times in varied declamation. Suddenly the scene changes to a hunting scene, horns join the orchestra, the tempo in common time is marked "allegro quasi presto". The voice is again set in expressive declamation, saying "And afterwards I will send out many hunters ...".

==== 2 ====
The recitative "Wie leichtlich könnte doch der Höchste uns entbehren" (How easily could the Highest do without us), ends on a question, "Does He ... abandon us to the deceit and trickery of the enemy?"

==== 3 ====
The answer is given in the aria "Nein, Gott ist allezeit geflissen" (No, God is always concerned), It begins immediately, without the usual ritornello, a passionate: "Nein, nein" (No, no). The middle section begins with a contrasting, but also passionate "Ja, ja" (Yes, yes). In the very end, the strings join the obbligato oboe d'amore and play a ritornello, reminiscent of a minuet. According to Alfred Dürr, the clear, even structure may symbolize the "rechte Bahn" ("right path" or "true path") mentioned in the text.

==== 4 ====
Movement 4 is a scene from the gospel, and forms the centre of the composition. The tenor as the Evangelist announces "Jesus sprach zu Simon:" (Jesus said to Simon). The direct speech of Jesus, calling Peter as his disciple, is sung by the bass as the vox Christi (voice of Christ): "Fürchte dich nicht; den von nun an wirst du Menschen fahen" (Fear not, from henceforth thou shalt catch men). The careful phasing is set on a continuo quasi ostinato.

==== 5 ====
A duet of soprano and alto, "Beruft Gott selbst, so muss der Segen" (If God Himself calls, then blessing) reflects God's blessing.

==== 6 ====
A recitative of the soprano, "Was kann dich denn in deinem Wandel schrecken" (What then can frighten you in your journey) expresses the consequence.

==== 7 ====
The closing chorale confirms, "Sing, bet und geh auf Gottes Wegen" (Sing, pray and walk in God's ways). It is a four-part setting.

== Recordings ==
The listing is taken from the selection provided on the Bach Cantatas Website. Ensembles playing period instruments in historically informed performance are marked by green background.

Recordings of Siehe, ich will viel Fischer aussenden
Title	Conductor / Choir / Orchestra	Soloists	Label	Year	Orch. type
Die Bach Kantate Vol. 42	Helmuth Rilling Figuralchor of the Gedächtniskirche Stuttgart Bach-Collegium Stuttgart	Ingeborg Reichelt; Verena Gohl; Adalbert Kraus; Wolfgang Schöne	Hänssler	1970	
J. S. Bach: Das Kantatenwerk • Complete Cantatas • Les Cantates, Folge / Vol. 79	Gustav Leonhardt: Knabenchor Hannover; Collegium Vocale Gent; Leonhardt-Consort	boy soloist of the Knabenchor Hannover; Paul Esswood; Kurt Equiluz; Max van Egmond	Teldec	1979	Period
Bach Cantatas Vol. 3: Tewkesbury/Mühlhausen / For the 4th Sunday after Trinity / For the 5th Sunday after Trinity	John Eliot Gardiner Monteverdi Choir English Baroque Soloists	Joanne Lunn; William Towers; Kobie van Rensburg; Peter Harvey	Soli Deo Gloria	2000	Period
Bach Edition Vol. 2 – Cantatas Vol. 6	Pieter Jan Leusink Holland Boys Choir Netherlands Bach Collegium	Ruth Holton; Sytse Buwalda; Marcel Beekman; Bas Ramselaar	Brilliant Classics	2000	Period
J. S. Bach: Complete Cantatas Vol. 19	Ton Koopman Amsterdam Baroque Orchestra & Choir	Johannette Zomer; Bogna Bartosz; Christoph Prégardien; Klaus Mertens	Antoine Marchand	2002	Period
J. S. Bach: Cantatas Vol. 44	Masaaki Suzuki Bach Collegium Japan	Rachel Nicholls; Robin Blaze; Gerd Türk; Peter Kooy	BIS	2008	Period

== Sources ==
- Siehe, ich will viel Fischer aussenden, BWV 88: Scores at the International Music Score Library Project
- Siehe, ich will viel Fischer aussenden BWV 88; BC A 105 / Sacred cantata (5th Sunday after Trinity) Bach Digital
- BWV 88 Siehe, ich will viel Fischer aussenden English translation, University of Vermont
- Luke Dahn: BWV 88.7 bach-chorales.com
