= Bleib bei uns, denn es will Abend werden, BWV 6 =

Church cantata by Johann Sebastian Bach

Bleib bei uns, denn es will Abend werden
- BWV 6
- Church cantata by J. S. Bach
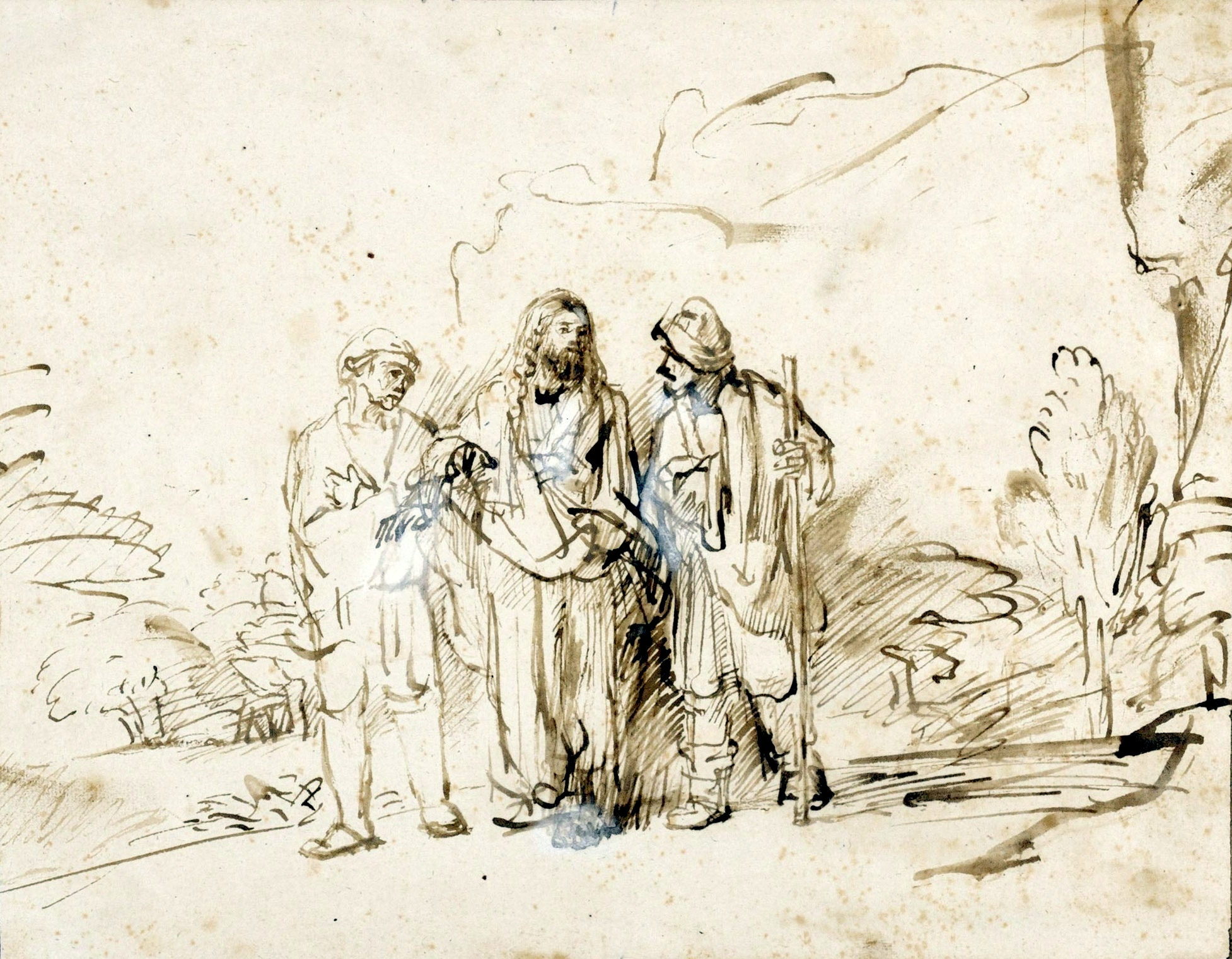
- Christ with Two Disciples, by Rembrandt
- Occasion: Easter Monday
- Chorale: "Ach bleib bei uns, Herr Jesu Christ" by Philipp Melanchthon, Nikolaus Selnecker; "Erhalt uns, Herr, bei deinem Wort" by Martin Luther
- Performed: 2 April 1725: Leipzig
- Vocal: SATB choir and solo
- Instrumental: 2 oboes; oboe da caccia; 2 violins; viola; violoncello piccolo; continuo

Bleib bei uns, denn es will Abend werden (Stay with us, for evening falls), BWV 6, is a cantata by Johann Sebastian Bach for use in a Lutheran service. He composed it in Leipzig in 1725 for Easter Monday and first performed it on 2 April 1725.

The prescribed readings for the feast day were Peter's sermon from the Acts of the Apostles, and the Road to Emmaus narration from the Gospel of Luke. The text by an anonymous librettist begins with a line from the gospel, and includes as the third movement two stanzas from Philipp Melanchthon's hymn "Ach bleib bei uns, Herr Jesu Christ", one stanza written by Nikolaus Selnecker. The text ends with the second stanza of Martin Luther's hymn "Erhalt uns, Herr, bei deinem Wort". Derived from the gospel scene, the topic is pleading for light in a situation of threatening darkness.

Bach structured the cantata in six movements and scored it for four vocal soloists, a four-part choir and a Baroque instrumental ensemble of oboes, strings and continuo. The extended opening chorus is formed like a French overture and has been compared to Ruht wohl, ihr heiligen Gebeine, the last chorus of Bach's St John Passion.

== History and text ==
In 1723, Bach was appointed as Thomaskantor (director of church music) in Leipzig, where he was responsible for the music at four churches and for the training and education of boys singing in the Thomanerchor. He took office in the middle of the liturgical year, on the first Sunday after Trinity. In his first twelve months in office, Bach decided to compose new works for almost all liturgical events, known as his first cantata cycle. The year after, he continued that effort, composing chorale cantatas based on Lutheran hymns. He kept the format of the chorale cantata cycle until Palm Sunday of 1725, but performed on Easter Sunday both the new Kommt, gehet und eilet, BWV 249, and the early chorale cantata Christ lag in Todes Banden, BWV 4. He wrote Bleib bei uns, denn es will Abend werden for Second Day of Easter as the first cantata in his second cantata cycle that was not a chorale cantata. The change was possibly due to the loss of a librettist.

The prescribed readings for the feast day were from the Acts of the Apostles, the sermon of Peter (Acts 10:34–43), and from the Gospel of Luke, the Road to Emmaus (Luke 24:13–35). Bach used a text by an anonymous poet who had already supplied librettos for his first cycle. The poet took verse 29 from the Gospel of Luke as a starting point: the two disciples ask the stranger whom they met on their way to stay with them, as darkness is about to fall. The situation represents the position of the Christian in general. The librettist chose two stanzas from "Ach bleib bei uns, Herr Jesu Christ" for the third movement, one written by Philipp Melanchthon as a German version of "Vespera iam venit", and of similar content as the first movement, and the other the hymn's second stanza which was added by Nikolaus Selnecker. The closing chorale is the second stanza of Martin Luther's hymn "Erhalt uns, Herr, bei deinem Wort" (Maintain us, Lord, within thy word). The libretto, of rather dry and didactic quality, is focused on the contrast between light and dark, viewing Jesus as the light of a sinful world. The author was possibly a theologian, who alluded to the Book of Revelation in the last aria.

Bach first performed the cantata on 2 April 1725. A subsequent performance is known for 13 April 1727, and later changes to instrumental parts are extant.

== Music ==
=== Scoring and structure ===
Bach structured the cantata in six movements. The first and last are set for choir, while the inner movements are set for soloists, in a sequence of aria – chorale – recitative – aria. Bach scored the work for four vocal soloists (soprano (S), alto (A), tenor (T) and bass (B)), a four-part choir, and a Baroque instrumental ensemble: two oboes (Ob), oboe da caccia (Oc), two violins (Vl), viola (Va), violoncello piccolo (Vp) and basso continuo (Bc). The duration of the piece was stated as 26 minutes by Bach scholar Alfred Dürr but some currently available recordings last about 20 minutes.

In the following table of the movements, the scoring follows the Neue Bach-Ausgabe. The keys and time signatures are taken from Dürr's book about the cantatas, using the symbol for common time (4/4). The instruments are shown separately for winds and strings, while the continuo, playing throughout, is not shown.

Movements of Bleib bei uns, denn es will Abend werden
No.	Title	Text	Type	Vocal	Winds	Strings	Key	Time
1	Bleib bei uns, denn es will Abend werden	Luke 24:29	Chorus	SATB	2Ob Oc	2Vl Va	C minor	3/4; 3/4
2	Hochgelobter Gottessohn	anon.	Aria	A	Oc	(or Va)	E♭ major	3/8
3	Ach bleib bei uns, Herr Jesu Christ; In dieser letzt'n betrübten Zeit	Melanchthon; Selnecker	Chorale	S		Vp	B♭ major	common time
4	Es hat die Dunkelheit an vielen Orten	anon.	Recitative	B				common time
5	Jesu, laß uns auf dich sehen	anon.	Aria	T		2Vl Va	G minor	cut time
6	Beweis dein Macht, Herr Jesu Christ	Luther	Chorale	SATB	2Ob Oc	2Vl Va	G minor	common time

=== Movements ===
==== 1 ====
The cantata opens with "Bleib bei uns, denn es will Abend werden" (Abide with us; for it is toward evening), a large-scale tripartite chorus, reminiscent of a slow sarabande or of the closing Ruht wohl, ihr heiligen Gebeine of the St John Passion. The instruments, a choir of three oboes and strings, present a theme which Dürr describes as "of speech-like gestures". It is picked up by the voices, first in homophony. The vocal lines in this movement descend on "denn es will Abend werden" (for evening is nigh) "as if the gloom of night were weighing upon them". While the beginning of the movement has no tempo marking, the middle section is marked Andante and in Alla-breve time, suggesting a faster pace. The voices, accompanied first only by the continuo, perform a fugue on two subjects at the same time: "denn es will Abend werden" (for it is toward evening) and "und der Tag hat sich geneiget" (and the day is far spent). A third motif, long notes on the same pitch, illustrates the "abiding" or staying. The movement is closed by a shortened reprise of the beginning. The Bach scholar Klaus Hofmann compares the slow-fast-slow structure of the movement to the French overture and notes that it opens a new series of cantatas.

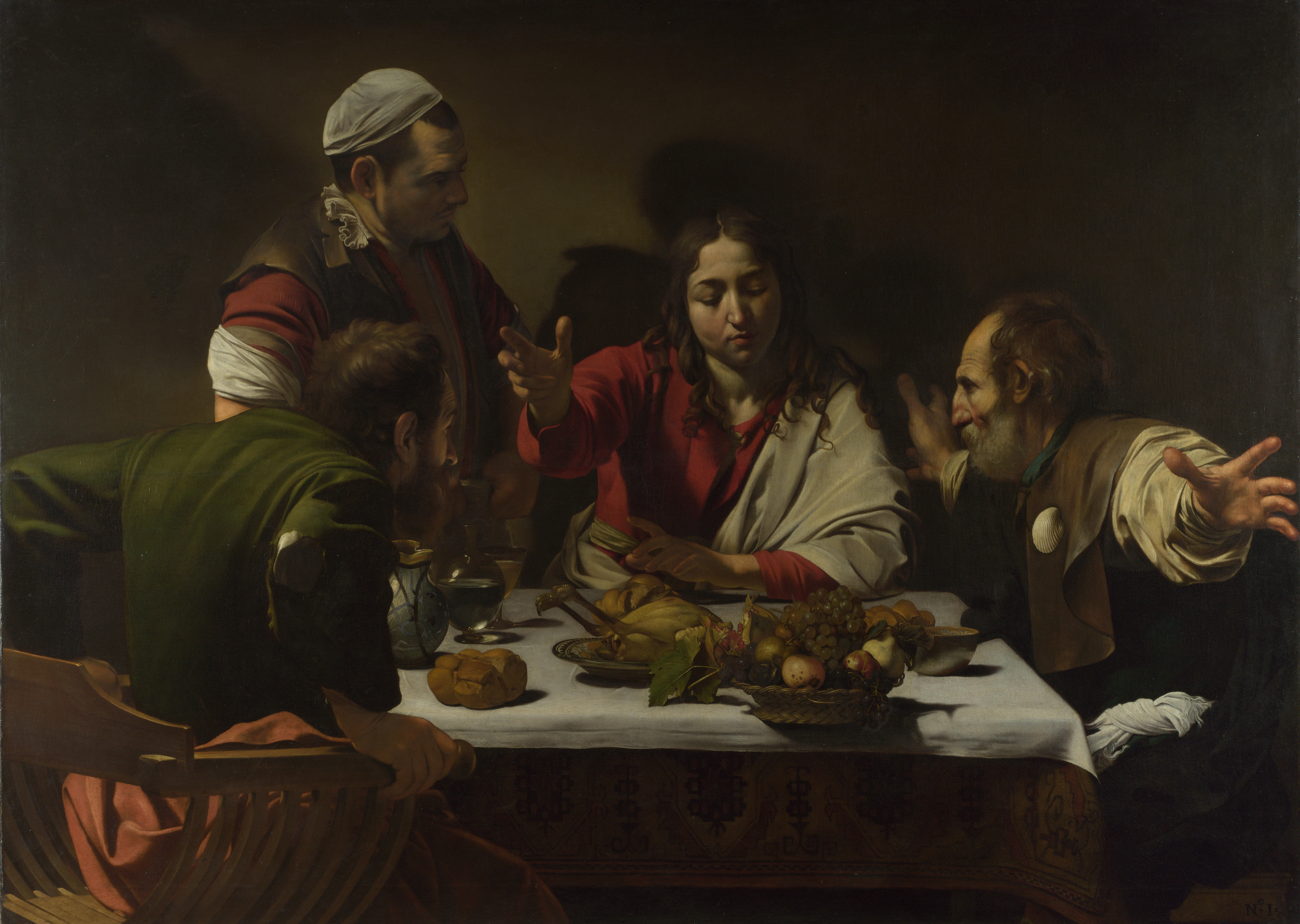
Supper at Emmaus by Caravaggio

John Eliot Gardiner, who conducted the Bach Cantata Pilgrimage in 2000, also noted the similarity to the last chorus, Ruht wohl, from the St John Passion, describing the cantata's "tender pleadings which become ever more gestural and urgent for enlightenment in a darkening world from which Jesus' presence has been removed." He notes that while descending motifs and modulations illustrate the emotions of insecurity when left alone in the dark, Bach "introduces a counter-balance" of remaining steadfast, "by threading 25 Gs then 35 B♭s played in unison by violins and violas through the surrounding dissonance" and by repeated pleas to Jesus to remain sung on one note during the fugue. Gardiner was reminded of a similar stark contrast of light and darkness in the painting Supper at Emmaus by Caravaggio.

==== 2 ====
The second movement, "Hochgelobter Gottessohn" (Highly praised Son of God), is a da capo aria for the alto, accompanied by an obbligato oboe da caccia, which was replaced by viola in later performances. Dürr describes the choice of voice and obbligato in the same range as unusual and "of special charme". The opening phrase is illustrated by an upward line, while the mention of falling darkness is interpreted by downward whole-tone steps.

==== 3 ====
The third movement, "Ach bleib bei uns, Herr Jesu Christ" (Ah remain with us, Lord Jesus Christ), is a setting of the chorale with a virtuoso part for violincello piccolo, while the two stanzas are sung by the soprano only. This movement was later adapted as one of the Schübler Chorales, BWV 649.

==== 4 ====
The only recitative is for bass, "Es hat die Dunkelheit an vielen Orten überhand genommen" (The darkness has taken over in many places). Its "threatening chromatic bass line" reminds the listeners of "the gravity of the situation".

==== 5 ====
The last aria, "Jesu, laß uns auf dich sehen" (Jesus, let us look upon You), is for tenor with string accompaniment. The four notes for the name Jesu are a cross motif. The movement is characterised by a persistent walking rhythm, somewhat mitigated by the flowing triplets in the violin line. Hofmann notes that the lively violin figures illustrate from the start the text about the "light of the Word of God shining more brightly", which appears only in the second part.

==== 6 ====
The four-part closing chorale, "Beweis dein Macht, Herr Jesu Christ" (Reveal Your strength, Lord Jesus Christ,), chorale is "quarried very little for musical building blocks", according to Julian Mincham, ending the work on a sombre tone.

== Recordings ==
The selection is taken from the listing on the Bach Cantatas Website. Instrumental groups playing period instruments in historically informed performances are marked green.

Recordings of Bleib bei uns, denn es will Abend werden
Title	Conductor / Choir / Orchestra	Soloists	Label	Year	Instr.
J. S. Bach: Cantatas BWV 6 & BWV 19	Hans Grischkat Stuttgart Choral Society Bach-Orchester Stuttgart	Agnes Giebel; Hetty Plümacher; Werner Hohmann; Bruno Müller	Renaissance	1951	
Les Grandes Cantates de J. S. Bach Vol. 7	Fritz Werner Heinrich-Schütz-Chor Heilbronn Pforzheim Chamber Orchestra	Ingeborg Reichelt; Hertha Töpper; Helmut Krebs; Franz Kelch	Erato	1959 (reissued)	
J. S. Bach: Das Kantatenwerk • Complete Cantatas • Les Cantates, Folge / Vol. 2	Nikolaus Harnoncourt: Wiener Sängerknaben; Chorus Viennensis; Concentus Musicus Wien	boy soloist; Paul Esswood; Kurt Equiluz; Max van Egmond	Teldec	1971	Period
Bach Cantatas Vol. 2 – Easter	Karl Richter Münchener Bach-Chor Münchener Bach-Orchester	soloist of the choir; Anna Reynolds; Peter Schreier; Theo Adam	Archiv Produktion	1974	
Die Bach Kantate Vol. 11	Helmuth Rilling Gächinger Kantorei Bach-Collegium Stuttgart	Edith Wiens; Carolyn Watkinson; Adalbert Kraus; Walter Heldwein	Hänssler	1980	
J. S. Bach: Easter Cantatas	John Eliot Gardiner Monteverdi Choir English Baroque Soloists	soloist of the choir; Bernarda Fink; Steve Davisilim; Julian Clarkson	Archiv Produktion	1999	Period
Bach Edition Vol. 11 – Cantatas Vol. 5	Pieter Jan Leusink Holland Boys Choir Netherlands Bach Collegium	Ruth Holton; Sytse Buwalda; Nico van der Meel; Bas Ramselaar	Brilliant Classics	1999	Period
J. S. Bach: Complete Cantatas Vol. 14	Ton Koopman Amsterdam Baroque Orchestra & Choir	soloist of the choir; Bogna Bartosz; Jörg Dürmüller; Klaus Mertens	Antoine Marchand	2001	Period
J. S. Bach: Cantatas Vol. 36 – Cantatas from Leipzig 1725	Masaaki Suzuki Bach Collegium Japan	Yukari Nonoshita; Robin Blaze; James Gilchrist; Dominik Wörner	BIS	2006	Period
Bach: Ascension oratorio & Easter cantatas, BWV 43 & 6	Philippe Herreweghe Collegium Vocale Gent	Dorothee Mields; Damien Guillon; Thomas Hobbs; Peter Kooy	YouTube	2014	Period
