= Ich hatte viel Bekümmernis, BWV 21 =

Church cantata by Johann Sebastian Bach

Ich hatte viel Bekümmernis
- BWV 21
- Church cantata by J. S. Bach
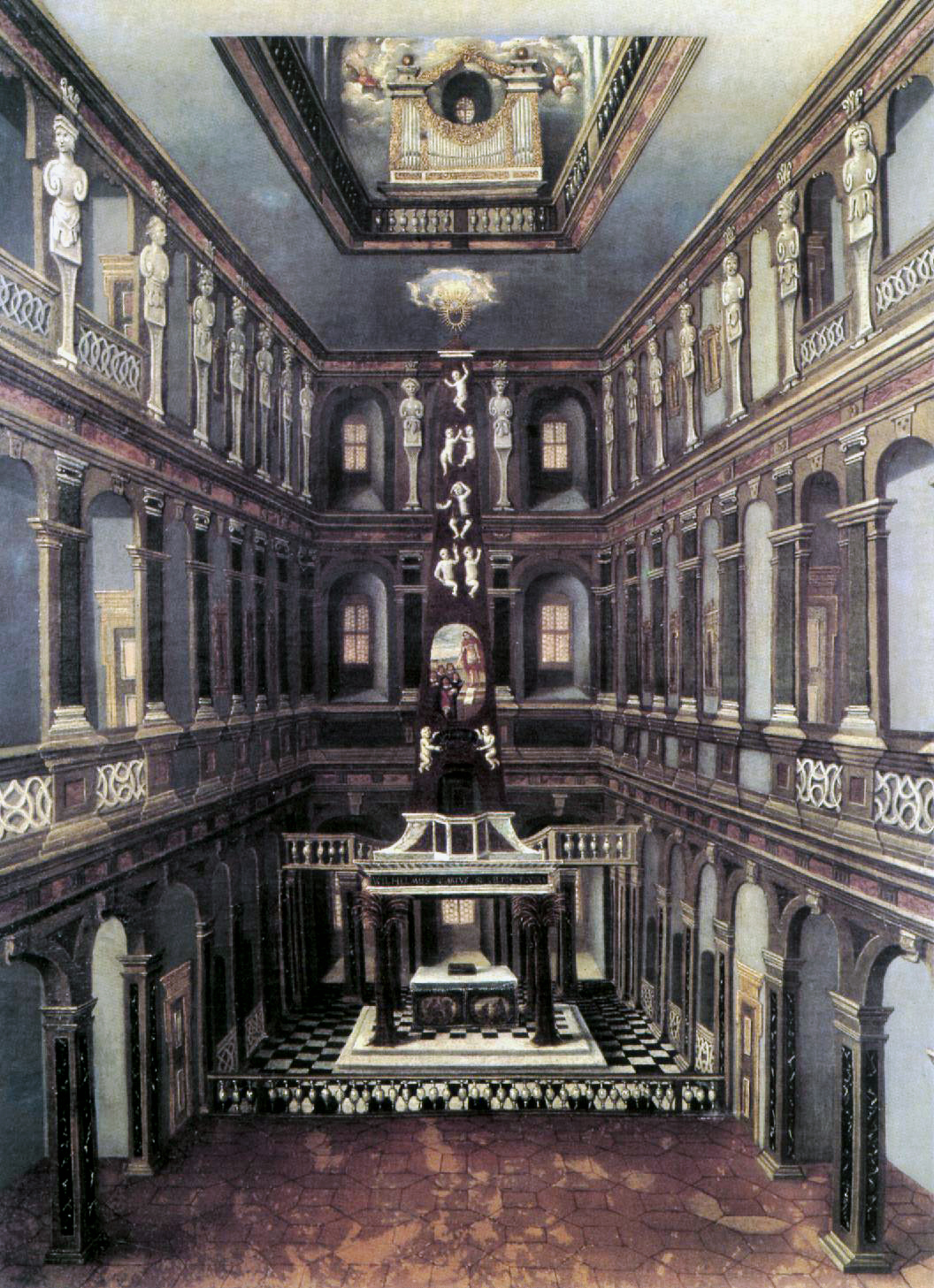
- The Schlosskirche in Weimar
- Occasion: Third Sunday after Trinity; any time
- Cantata text: Likely Salomon Franck
- Bible text: Psalms 94:19; Psalms 42:11; Psalms 116:7; Revelation 5:12–13
- Chorale: by Georg Neumark
- Performed: 17 June 1714: Weimar
- Movements: 11 in two parts (6 + 5)
- Vocal: SATB choir; Solo: soprano, tenor, bass
- Instrumental: 3 trumpets; timpani; 4 trombones; oboe; bassoon; 2 violins; viola; continuo

Johann Sebastian Bach composed the church cantata Ich hatte viel Bekümmernis (I had much grief), BWV 21 in Weimar, possibly in 1713, partly even earlier. He used it in 1714 and later for the third Sunday after Trinity of the liturgical year. The work marks a transition between motet style on biblical and hymn text to operatic recitatives and arias on contemporary poetry. Bach catalogued the work as e per ogni tempo (and for all times), indicating that due to its general theme, the cantata is suited for any occasion.

The text was probably written by the court poet Salomon Franck, who includes four biblical quotations from three psalms and from the Book of Revelation, and juxtaposes in one movement biblical text with two stanzas from Georg Neumark's hymn "Wer nur den lieben Gott lässt walten". The cantata is structured in eleven movements, including an opening sinfonia. It is divided in two parts to be performed before and after the sermon, and scored for three vocal soloists (soprano, tenor, and bass), a four-part choir, and a Baroque instrumental ensemble of three trumpets, timpani, oboe, strings and continuo.

Bach led a performance in the court chapel of Schloss Weimar on 17 June 1714, known as the Weimar version. He revised the work for performances, possibly in Hamburg and several revivals in Leipzig, adding for the first Leipzig version four trombones playing colla parte.

== History and words ==
Bach composed the cantata in Weimar, but the composition history is complicated and not at all stages certain. Findings by Martin Petzoldt suggest that the cantata began with the later movements 2–6 and 9–10, most of them on biblical text, performed at a memorial service of Aemilia Maria Haress, the wife of a former prime-minister of Schwarzburg-Rudolstadt, at the church St. Peter und Paul in Weimar on 8 October 1713. Bach may then have expanded it and presented it for his application in December 1713 at the Liebfrauenkirche in Halle. The performance material of this event, the only surviving source, shows on the title page the designation e per ogni tempo, indicating that the cantata with its general readings and texts is suitable for any occasion.

Bach designated the cantata to the Third Sunday after Trinity of 1714. The prescribed readings for the Sunday were from the First Epistle of Peter, "Cast thy burden upon the Lord" (1 Peter 5:6–11), and from the Gospel of Luke, the parable of the Lost Sheep and the parable of the Lost Coin (Luke 15:1–10). The librettist was probably the court poet Salomon Franck, as in most cantatas of the period, such as Erschallet, ihr Lieder, erklinget, ihr Saiten! BWV 172. The text shows little connection to the prescribed gospel, but is related to the epistle reading. The poet included biblical texts for four movements: for movement 2 Psalms 94:19, for movement 6 Psalms 42:11, translated in the King James Version (KJV) to "Why art thou cast down, O my soul? and why art thou disquieted in me? hope thou in God: for I shall yet praise him for the help of his countenance.", for movement 9 Psalms 116:7 (KJV: "Return unto thy rest, O my soul; for the Lord hath dealt bountifully with thee."), and for movement 11 Revelation 5:12–13, "Worthy is the Lamb", the text also chosen to conclude Handel's Messiah. Similar to other cantatas of that time, ideas are expressed in dialogue: in movements 7 and 8 the soprano portrays the Seele (Soul), while the part of Jesus is sung by the bass as the vox Christi (voice of Christ). Only movement 9 uses text from a hymn, juxtaposing the biblical text with stanzas 2 and 5 of "Wer nur den lieben Gott lässt walten" by Georg Neumark, who published it with his own melody in Jena in 1657 in the collection Fortgepflantzter Musikalisch-Poetischer Lustwald.

Bach performed the cantata in the court chapel of Schloss Weimar on 17 June 1714, as his fourth work in a series of monthly cantatas for the Weimar court which came with his promotion to Konzertmeister (concert master) in 1714. The so-called Weimar version, his first composition for an ordinary Sunday in the second half of the liturgical year, marked also a farewell to Duke Johann Ernst who began a journey then. A performance, documented by original parts, could have been in Hamburg to apply for the position as organist at St. Jacobi in November 1720, this time in D minor instead of C minor. As Thomaskantor in Leipzig, Bach performed the cantata again on his third Sunday in office on 13 June 1723, as the title page shows. For this performance, now again in C minor, he also changed the instrumentation, adding four trombones to double the tutti voices within movement 9. This version was used in several revivals during Bach's lifetime and is mostly played today.

== Music ==
=== Scoring and structure ===
Bach structured the cantata in eleven movements in two parts, Part I (movements 1–6) to be performed before the sermon, Part II (7–11) after the sermon. He scored it for three vocal soloists (soprano (S), tenor (T) and bass (B)), a four-part choir SATB, three trumpets (Tr) and timpani only in the final movement, four trombones (Tb) (only in Movement 9 and only in the 1723 version to double voices in the fifth stanza of the chorale), oboe (Ob), two violins (Vl), viola (Va), and basso continuo (Bc), with bassoon (Fg) and organ (Org) explicitly indicated. The duration is given as 44 minutes.

In the following table of the movements, the scoring and keys are given for the version performed in Leipzig in 1723. The keys and time signatures are taken from Alfred Dürr, using the symbol for common time (4/4). The instruments are shown separately for winds and strings, while the continuo, playing throughout, is not shown.

Movements of Ich hatte viel Bekümmernis – Part I
| No. | Title | Text | Type | Vocal | Winds | Strings | Key | Time |
|---|---|---|---|---|---|---|---|---|
| 1 | | | Sinfonia | | Ob | 2Vl Va | C minor | common time |
| 2 | Ich hatte viel Bekümmernis in meinem Herzen | Psalm 94:19 | Chorus | SATB | Ob Fg | 2Vl Va | C minor | common time |
| 3 | Seufzer, Tränen, Kummer, Not | Likely Franck | Aria | S | Ob | | C minor | 12/8 |
| 4 | Wie hast du dich, mein Gott | Likely Franck | Recitative | T | | 2Vl Va | | common time |
| 5 | Bäche von gesalznen Zähren | Likely Franck | Aria | T | Fg | 2Vl Va | F minor | common time |
| 6 | Was betrübst du dich, meine Seele | Psalm 42:11 | Chorus | SATB | Ob Fg | 2Vl Va | F minor; C minor | 3/4 |

Movements of Ich hatte viel Bekümmernis – Part II
| No. | Title | Text | Type | Vocal | Winds | Strings | Key | Time |
|---|---|---|---|---|---|---|---|---|
| 7 | Ach Jesu, meine Ruh | Likely Franck | Recitative Dialogus | S B | | 2Vl Va | E-flat major | common time |
| 8 | Komm, mein Jesu, und erquicke / Ja, ich komme und erquicke | Likely Franck | Aria | S B | | | E-flat major | 3/8 |
| 9 | Sei nun wieder zufrieden, meine Seele | Psalm 116:7; Neumark | Chorus and Chorale | SATB | Ob 4Tbne Fg | 2Vl Va | G minor | 3/4 |
| 10 | Erfreue dich, Seele, erfreue dich, Herze | Likely Franck | Aria | T | | | F major | 3/8 |
| 11 | Das Lamm, das erwürget ist | Revelation 5:12–13 | Chorus | SATB | 3Tr Timpani Ob Fg | 2Vl Va | C major | common time |

=== Movements ===
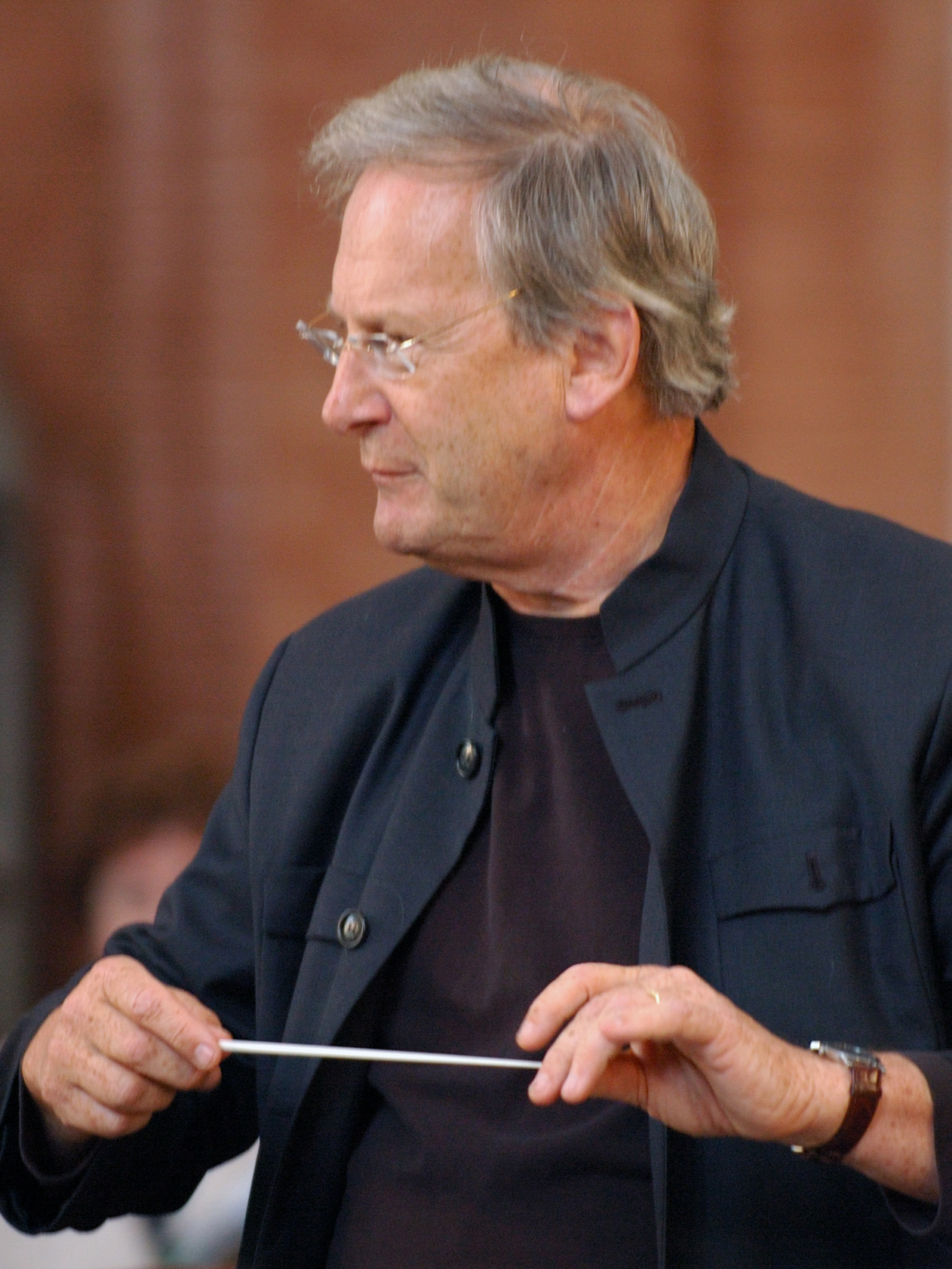
John Eliot Gardiner, who conducted the Bach Cantata Pilgrimage, in 2007

The music for this early cantata uses motet style in the choral movements. Biblical words are used in a prominent way. They are treated in choral movements, different from other cantatas of the Weimar period where they were typically composed as recitatives. John Eliot Gardiner, who conducted all of Bach's church cantatas in 2000 as the Bach Cantata Pilgrimage, termed the cantata "one of the most extraordinary and inspired of Bach's vocal works". He notes aspects of the music which are similar to movements in Bach's early cantatas, suggesting that they may have been composed already when Bach moved to Weimar in 1708: the psalm verses resemble movements of cantatas such as Nach dir, Herr, verlanget mich, BWV 150, and Aus der Tiefen rufe ich, Herr, zu dir, BWV 131, the dialogue of the Soul and Jesus (movement 8) is reminiscent of the Actus tragicus, and the hymn in motet style (movement 9) recalls movements 2 and 5 of the chorale cantata Christ lag in Todes Banden, BWV 4.

==== Part I ====
Themes of deep suffering, pain and mourning dominate the music in the first part of the cantata. Gardiner notes that five of the six movements are "set almost obsessively in C minor".

===== 1 =====
The work is opened by a Sinfonia similar to the cantata Weinen, Klagen, Sorgen, Zagen, BWV 12, possibly the slow movement of a concerto for oboe and violin. A sighing motif, the picture of a storm of tears, and the flood image conjured by the upwelling music characterizes the dark and oppressive feeling.

===== 2 =====
The first vocal movement is a choral motet on the psalm verse "Ich hatte viel Bekümmernis in meinem Herzen" (I had much trouble in my heart). The music has two contrasting sections, following the contrast of the psalm verse which continues "aber deine Tröstungen erquicken meine Seele" (but your consolations revive my soul). The word "Ich" (I) is repeated several times, followed by a fugal section. A homophonic setting of aber (but) leads to the second section, in free polyphony, marked Vivace. It broadens to Andante for a solemn conclusion.

===== 3 =====
The soprano aria "Seufzer, Tränen, Kummer, Not" (Sighs, tears, anguish, trouble) is one of the first arias in Italian style in a Bach cantata, accompanied by an obbligato oboe.

==== 4 ====
The tenor sings in accompanied recitative with the strings "Wie hast du dich, mein Gott" (What? have You therefore, my God,).

===== 5 =====
The tenor, accompanied by the strings, intensifies the mood: "Bäche von gesalznen Zähren" (Streams of salty tears).

===== 6 =====
A consoling verse from a psalm is treated as a closing motet of Part I: "Was betrübst du dich, meine Seele" (Why do you trouble yourself, my soul). Alfred Dürr analyzes in detail how different means of expression follow the text closely, with shifts in tempo and texture, culminating in a "permutation fugue of remarkably logical structure" on the final "daß er meines Angesichtes Hilfe und mein Gott ist" (for being the help of my countenance and my God).

==== Part II ====
The second part begins in a different mood, through the trust of sinners in the grace of God. In a recitative and an aria, the Soul (soprano) and Jesus (bass as the voice of Christ) enter a dialogue, leading to a final choral movement as a strong hymn of praise.

===== 7 =====
Soprano and bass enter a dialogue in accompanied recitative with the strings. The Soul asks: "Ach Jesu, meine Ruh, mein Licht, wo bleibest du?" (Ah, Jesus, my peace, my light, where are You?). Dialogue was common in Protestant church music from the 17th century but is especially dramatic here.

===== 8 =====
Soprano and bass unite in an aria: "Komm, mein Jesu, und erquicke / Ja, ich komme und erquicke" (Come, my Jesus, and revive / Yes, I come and revive), accompanied only by the continuo. It resembles passionate love duets from contemporary opera.

First few bars of the duet, continuo omitted

===== 9 =====
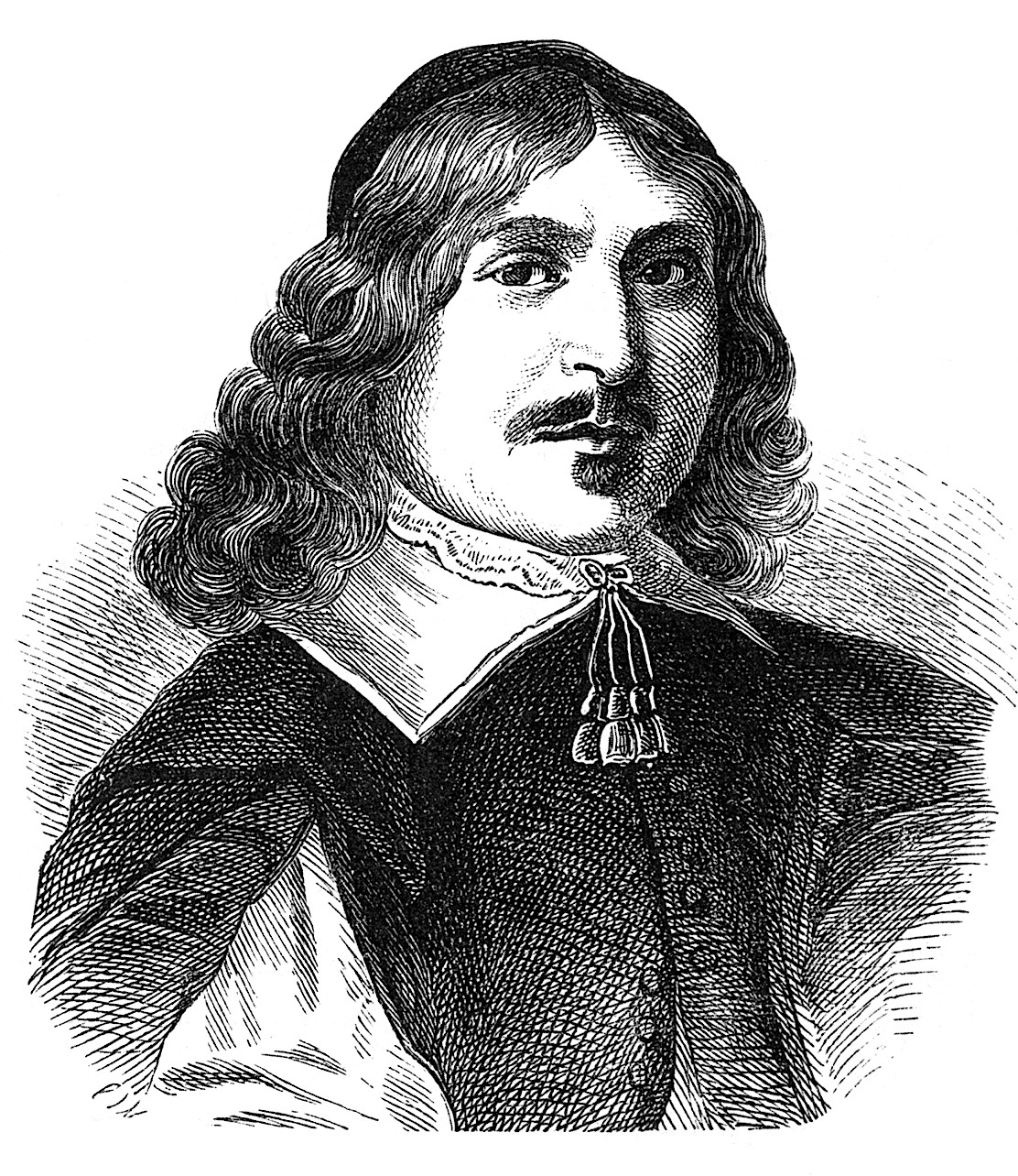
Georg Neumark, the author of the hymn "Wer nur den lieben Gott lässt walten"

In a movement unusual in Bach works, biblical text from a psalm, "Sei nun wieder zufrieden, meine Seele" (Be at peace again, my soul), is juxtaposed with two stanzas from Georg Neumark's hymn, stanza 2, "Was helfen uns die schweren Sorgen" (What good are heavy worries?), and stanza 5, "Denk nicht in deiner Drangsalshitze" (Think not, in your heat of despair,) The first hymn stanza is sung by tenors while solo voices render the biblical text. In the second stanza the soprano has the melody and the voices are doubled by a choir of trombones introduced in the Leipzig version of 1723.

===== 10 =====
The tenor aria "Erfreue dich, Seele, erfreue dich, Herze" (Rejoice, soul, rejoice, heart) is accompanied only by the continuo. Dürr describes the mood as "spirited, excited abandon".

===== 11 =====
The concluding movement is a motet on a quotation from Revelation, "Das Lamm, das erwürget ist" (The Lamb, that was slain). Three trumpets and timpani appear only in this triumphant movements of praise. It begins in homophony and expresses the text "Lob und Ehre und Preis und Gewalt" (Glory and honour and praise and power) in another permutation fugue with a climax in the subject played by the first trumpet.

== Recordings ==
A list of recordings is provided on the Bach Cantatas Website. Ensembles playing period instruments in historically informed performance are marked by a green background.

Recordings of Ich hatte viel Bekümmernis
| Title | Conductor / Choir / Orchestra | Soloists | Label | Year | Orch. type |
|---|---|---|---|---|---|
| J. S. Bach: Kantaten BWV 21, 110 (Ramin Edition Vol. 1) | Günther Ramin Thomanerchor Gewandhausorchester | boy soloist of the Thomanerchor; Gert Lutze; Friedrich Härtel; Diethard Hellmann (organ) | Fidelio | 1947 | |
| J. S. Bach: Cantata BWV 21 | Fritz Lehmann Berliner Motettenchor Berliner Philharmoniker | Gunthild Weber; Helmut Krebs; Hermann Schey | Deutsche Grammophon | 1952 | |
| J. S. Bach: Cantata BWV 21 | Marcel Couraud Stuttgarter Chor Stuttgarter Orchester | Friederike Sailer; Fritz Wunderlich; Robert Titze | Les Discophiles | 1955 | |
| Les Grandes Cantates de J. S. Bach Vol. 11 | Fritz Werner Heinrich-Schütz-Chor Heilbronn Pforzheim Chamber Orchestra | Edith Selig; Georg Jelden; Erich Wenk | Erato | 1962 | |
| Bach Cantatas Vol. 3 – Ascension Day, Whitsun, Trinity | Karl Richter Münchener Bach-Chor Münchener Bach-Orchester | Edith Mathis; Ernst Haefliger; Dietrich Fischer-Dieskau | Archiv Produktion | 1969 | |
| J. S. Bach: Das Kantatenwerk • Complete Cantatas • Les Cantates, Folge / Vol. 20 | Nikolaus Harnoncourt Wiener Sängerknaben Concentus Musicus Wien | soloist of the Wiener Sängerknaben; Kurt Equiluz; Walker Wyatt | Teldec | 1973 | Period |
| Die Bach Kantate Vol. 14 | Helmuth Rilling Indiana University Chamber Singers Bach-Collegium Stuttgart | Arleen Augér; Adalbert Kraus; Wolfgang Schöne | Hänssler | 1976 | |
| J. S. Bach: Magnificat BWV 243 · Cantata BWV 21 | Sigiswald Kuijken Nederlands Kamerkoor La Petite Bande | Greta De Reyghere; Christoph Prégardien; Peter Lika | Virgin Classics | 1983 | Period |
| J. S. Bach: Ich hatte viel Bekümmernis | Philippe Herreweghe Collegium Vocale Gent La Chapelle Royale | Barbara Schlick; Howard Crook; Peter Harvey | Harmonia Mundi | 1990 | Period |
| Christmas With the Vienna Boys Choir | Peter Marschik Wiener Sängerknaben Stuttgart Philharmonic Orchestra | Stefan Preyer; Albin Lenzer; Michael Knapp; Ernst Jankowitsch | Delta Entertainment Corporation | 1993 | |
| J. S. Bach: Complete Cantatas Vol. 1 | Ton Koopman Amsterdam Baroque Orchestra & Choir | Barbara Schlick; Guy de Mey; Klaus Mertens | Antoine Marchand | 1994 | Period |
| J. S. Bach: Cantatas Vol. 6 | Masaaki Suzuki Bach Collegium Japan | Monika Frimmer; Gerd Türk; Peter Kooy | BIS | 1997 | Period |
| Bach Edition Vol. 19 – Cantatas Vol. 10 | Pieter Jan Leusink Holland Boys Choir Netherlands Bach Collegium | Ruth Holton; Knut Schoch; Bas Ramselaar | Brilliant Classics | 2000 | Period |
| Bach Cantatas Vol. 2: Paris/Zürich / For the 2nd Sunday after Trinity / For the 3rd Sunday after Trinity | John Eliot Gardiner Monteverdi Choir English Baroque Soloists | Lisa Larsson; James Gilchrist; Stephen Varcoe | Soli Deo Gloria | 2000 | Period |
