= Siehe zu, daß deine Gottesfurcht nicht Heuchelei sei, BWV 179 =

Church cantata by Johann Sebastian Bach

Siehe zu, daß deine Gottesfurcht nicht Heuchelei sei
- BWV 179
- Church cantata by Johann Sebastian Bach
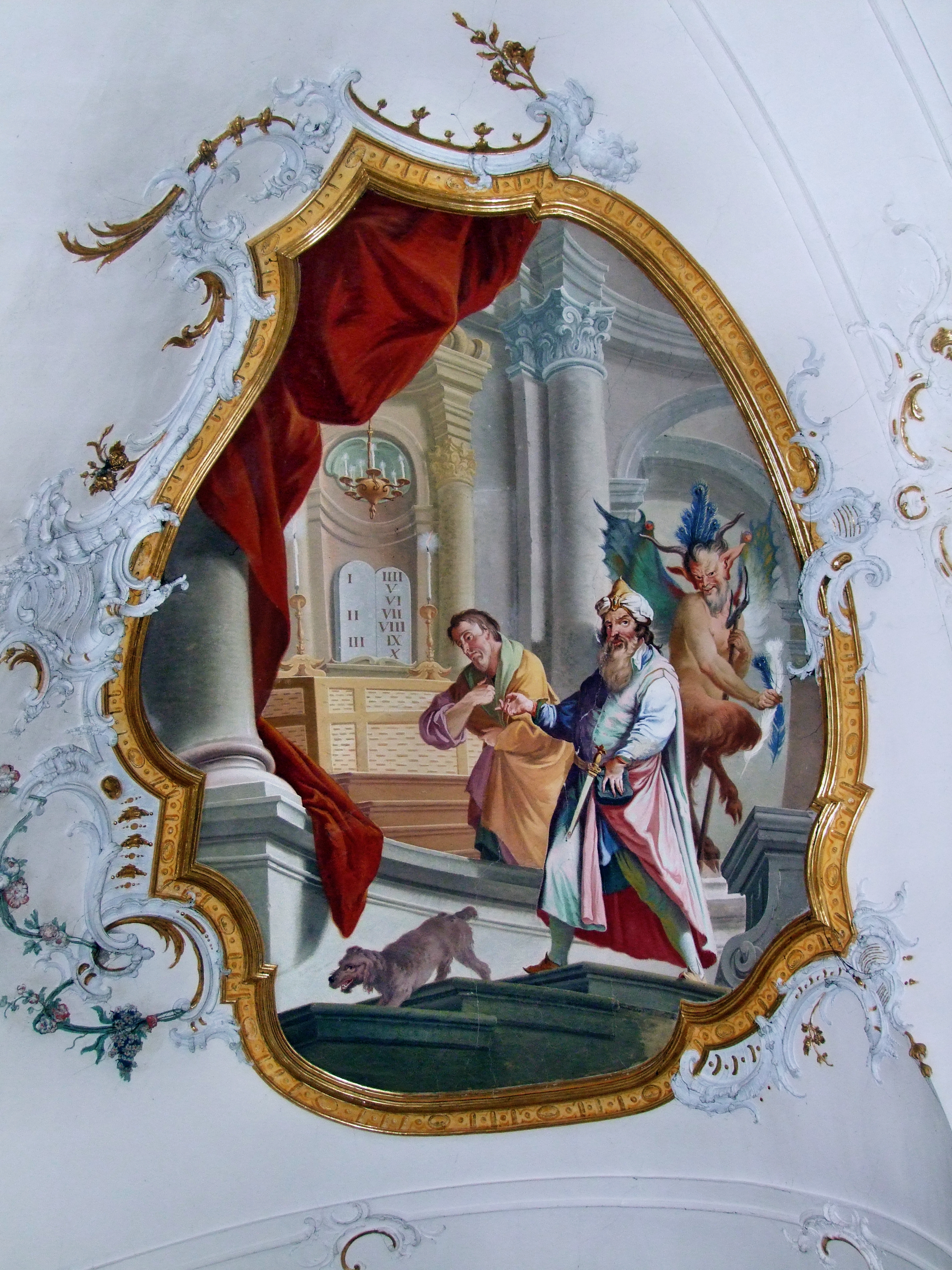
- Fresco of Pharisee and tax collector
- Occasion: Eleventh Sunday after Trinity
- Chorale: by Christoph Tietze
- Performed: 8 August 1723: Leipzig
- Movements: six
- Vocal: SATB choir and solo
- Instrumental: 2 oboes da caccia; 2 violins; viola; continuo

Johann Sebastian Bach composed the church cantata Siehe zu, daß deine Gottesfurcht nicht Heuchelei sei (See to it, that your fear of God be not hypocrisy), BWV 179 in Leipzig for the eleventh Sunday after Trinity and first performed it on 8 August 1723.

== History and words ==
Bach composed the cantata in his first year in Leipzig, which he had started after Trinity of 1723, for the Eleventh Sunday after Trinity. The prescribed readings for the Sunday were from the First Epistle to the Corinthians, on the gospel of Christ and Paul's duty as an apostle (1 Corinthians 15:1–10), and from the Gospel of Luke, the parable of the Pharisee and the Tax Collector (Luke 18:9–14). The unknown poet stayed close to the gospel and alluded to several Bible passages. The cantata is opened by a line from Wisdom of Sirach 1:29. the closing chorale is the first stanza of Christoph Tietze's hymn "Ich armer Mensch, ich armer Sünder" (1663).

Bach first performed the cantata on 8 August 1723. Alfred Dürr assumes that Mein Herze schwimmt im Blut, BWV 199, composed for the same occasion in Weimar, was also performed at the service.

== Scoring and structure ==
The cantata in six movements is scored for soprano, tenor and bass soloists, a four-part choir, and a Baroque instrumental ensemble of two oboes da caccia, two violins, viola, and basso continuo.

1. Chorus: Siehe zu, daß deine Gottesfurcht nicht Heuchelei sei
2. Recitative (tenor): Das heutge Christentum ist leider schlecht bestellt
3. Aria (tenor): Falscher Heuchler Ebenbild
4. Recitative (bass): Wer so von innen wie von außen ist
5. Aria (soprano): Liebster Gott, erbarme dich
6. Chorale: Ich armer Mensch, ich armer Sünder

== Music ==
In the opening chorus the instruments go with the voices as in a motet. The words are set in a strict counter-fugue: each entrance is followed by an entrance in inversion. The sequence is concluded by a canonic imitation on a new theme: in the words "und diene Gott nicht mit einem falschen Herzen" (and do not serve God with a false heart) the falseness is expressed by chromaticism. A second expanded fugue presents even more complex counterpoint than the first.

A secco recitative prepares the aria with an accompaniment of the two oboe da caccia and violin I in syncopation, which even the tenor voice picks up in the first part. It is not a da capo aria, as only the ritornello repeats the beginning. The final words of the second recitative end like an arioso to stress "So kannst du Gnad und Hilfe finden!" (so that you can find mercy and aid). The soprano aria expresses like a prayer "Liebster Gott, erbarme dich" (Beloved God, have mercy). The two oboes da caccia illustrate a movement of supplication even together with the soprano voice.

The final chorale is sung on the melody of ""Wer nur den lieben Gott läßt walten", which Bach also used in his choral cantata BWV 93.

Bach used the music of the opening chorus again for the Kyrie of his Missa in G major, the first aria for the Quoniam of that mass, and the second aria for the Qui tollis of the Missa in A major.

== Performances ==
The cantata was performed at The Proms of 2007 with the Bach Collegium Japan and soloists Carolyn Sampson, Gerd Türk and Peter Kooy, conducted by Masaaki Suzuki.

== Recordings ==
- Die Bach Kantate Vol. 46, Helmuth Rilling, Gächinger Kantorei, Bach-Collegium Stuttgart, Arleen Augér, Kurt Equiluz, Wolfgang Schöne, Hänssler 1974
- Bach Cantatas Vol. 4 – Sundays after Trinity I, Karl Richter, Münchener Bach-Chor, Münchener Bach-Orchester, Edith Mathis, Peter Schreier, Dietrich Fischer-Dieskau, Archiv Produktion 1977
- J. S. Bach: Das Kantatenwerk – Sacred Cantatas Vol. 9, Nikolaus Harnoncourt, Tölzer Knabenchor, Concentus Musicus Wien, soloist of the Tölzer Knabenchor, Kurt Equiluz, Robert Holl, Teldec 1988
- J. S. Bach: Complete Cantatas Vol. 6, Ton Koopman, Amsterdam Baroque Orchestra & Choir, Ruth Ziesak, Paul Agnew, Klaus Mertens, Antoine Marchand 1997
- J. S. Bach: Cantatas Vol. 10, Masaaki Suzuki, Bach Collegium Japan, Miah Persson, Makoto Sakurada, Peter Kooy, BIS 1999
- J. S. Bach: Trinity Cantatas II, John Eliot Gardiner, Monteverdi Choir, English Baroque Soloists, Magdalena Kožená, Mark Padmore, Stephan Loges, Archiv Produktion 2000
- J. S. Bach: Cantatas for the Complete Liturgical Year Vol. 5, Sigiswald Kuijken, La Petite Bande, Gerlinde Sämann, Jan Kobow, Jan van der Crabben, Accent 2006

== Sources ==
- Siehe zu, dass deine Gottesfurcht, BWV 179: Scores at the International Music Score Library Project
- Siehe zu, dass deine Gottesfurcht nicht Heuchelei sei BWV 179; BC A 121 / Sacred cantata (11th Sunday after Trinity) Bach Digital
- Siehe zu, daß deine Gottesfurcht nicht Heuchelei sei history, scoring, sources for text and music, translations to various languages, discography, discussion, Bach Cantatas Website
- BWV 179 Siehe zu, daß deine Gottesfurcht nicht Heuchelei sei English translation, University of Vermont
- BWV 179 Siehe zu, daß deine Gottesfurcht nicht Heuchelei sei text, scoring, University of Alberta
- Luke Dahn: BWV 179.6 bach-chorales.com
