= Schübler Chorales =

Set of chorale preludes by Johann Sebastian Bach

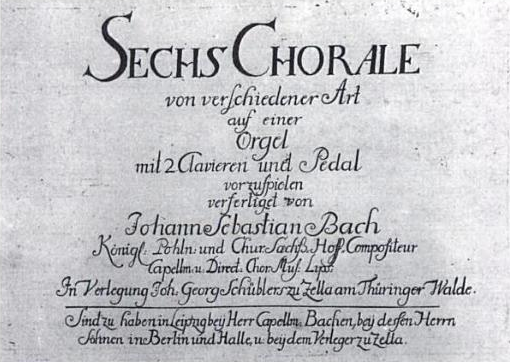
Title page of the 1740s first edition of the Schübler Chorales

Sechs Chorale von verschiedener Art: auf einer Orgel mit 2 Clavieren und Pedal vorzuspielen (lit. 'six chorales of diverse kinds, to be played on an organ with two manuals and pedal'), commonly known as the Schübler Chorales (German: Schübler-Choräle), BWV 645–650, is a set of chorale preludes composed by Johann Sebastian Bach. Johann Georg Schübler, after whom the collection came to be named, published it in 1747 or before August 1748, in Zella St. Blasii. At least five preludes of the compilation are transcribed from movements in Bach's church cantatas, mostly chorale cantatas he had composed around two decades earlier.

The fact that Bach had gone to the trouble and expense of securing the services of a master engraver to produce a collection of note-for-note transcriptions of this kind indicates that he did not regard the Schübler Chorales as a minor piece of hack-work, but as a significant public statement. These six chorales provide an approachable version of the music of the cantatas through the more marketable medium of keyboard transcriptions. Virtually all Bach's cantatas were unpublished in his lifetime.

== Context and content ==
The hymn tunes of the Lutheran hymns on which the chorale settings included in the Schübler Chorales are based can be identified by their Zahn number. The fourth chorale of the set is however based on a German variant of the Ninth psalm tone.

Five of the Schübler Chorales are transcriptions of movements of extant church cantatas by Bach. These cantatas belong to the chorale cantata or second year cycle. Bach began to present the cantatas of this cycle from the first Sunday after Trinity 11 June 1724, which was the start of his second year in Leipzig. He continued to present 40 new chorale cantatas until Easter of the next year, 1 April 1725, from which day the chorale cantata cycle and the second year cycle no longer coincide: for the remainder of his second year in Leipzig his newly composed church cantatas were no longer in the chorale cantata format, while on the other hand he added chorale cantatas to the cycle which were composed outside the period of his second year in Leipzig. Listed according to the sequence of the liturgical year:

- BWV 6 is a cantata for Easter Monday: it was first presented in Bach's second year in Leipzig, on 2 April 1725, shortly after Bach had discontinued chorale cantatas in that year. Its third movement is the model for BWV 649.
- BWV 10 is a cantata for Visitation: this chorale cantata was presented during Bach's second year in Leipzig, on the Feast of the Visitation, 2 July 1724. Its fifth movement is the model for BWV 648.
- BWV 93 is a cantata for the fifth Sunday after Trinity: first presented one week after BWV 10, on 9 July 1724, it also belongs to both the chorale cantata cycle and the second year cycle. Its fourth movement is the model for BWV 647.
- BWV 137 is a cantata for the twelfth Sunday after Trinity: first performed on 19 August 1725 it is a later addition to the chorale cantata cycle. Its second movement is the model for BWV 650.
- BWV 140 is a cantata for the 27th Sunday after Trinity (or: the last Sunday before Advent): first performed on 25 November 1731 it is a later addition to the chorale cantata cycle. Its fourth movement is the model for BWV 645.

For BWV 646 there is no extant model from which the chorale prelude may have transcribed. Apart from some original manuscripts of the preceding cantata models there are no extant manuscripts of the Schübler Chorales older than their 1747–1748 printed version: Bach's only extant autograph regarding the organ versions consists of the corrections and improvements he wrote, before August 1748, in his copy of the first edition.

All six Schübler Chorales are in the chorale fantasia format: this means that one of the melody lines in the setting is the relatively unadorned chorale tune, which is called cantus firmus. The two central preludes of the set (BWV 647 and 648) are four-part settings, while the others are three-part settings (trios).

External audio
- You may hear the Chorale Prelude For Organ, BWV 645: "Wachet auf, ruft uns die Stimme" as performed by E. Power Biggs in 1968; Here on archive.org

BWV	#	Title	Model	Date	Tune
645	1	Wachet auf, ruft uns die Stimme	BWV 140/4	25 November 1731	Zahn No. 8405
646	2	Wo soll ich fliehen hin	(unknown)		Zahn No. 2164
646	2	Auf meinen lieben Gott	(unknown)		Zahn No. 2164
647	3	Wer nur den lieben Gott lässt walten	BWV 93/4	9 July 1724	Zahn No. 2778
648	4	Meine Seele erhebt den Herren	BWV 10/5	2 July 1724	9th psalm tone
649	5	Ach bleib bei uns, Herr Jesu Christ	BWV 6/3	2 April 1725	Zahn No. 493
650	6	Kommst du nun, Jesu, vom Himmel herunter	BWV 137/2	19 August 1725	Zahn No. 1912a

=== Wachet auf, ruft uns die Stimme, BWV 645 ===
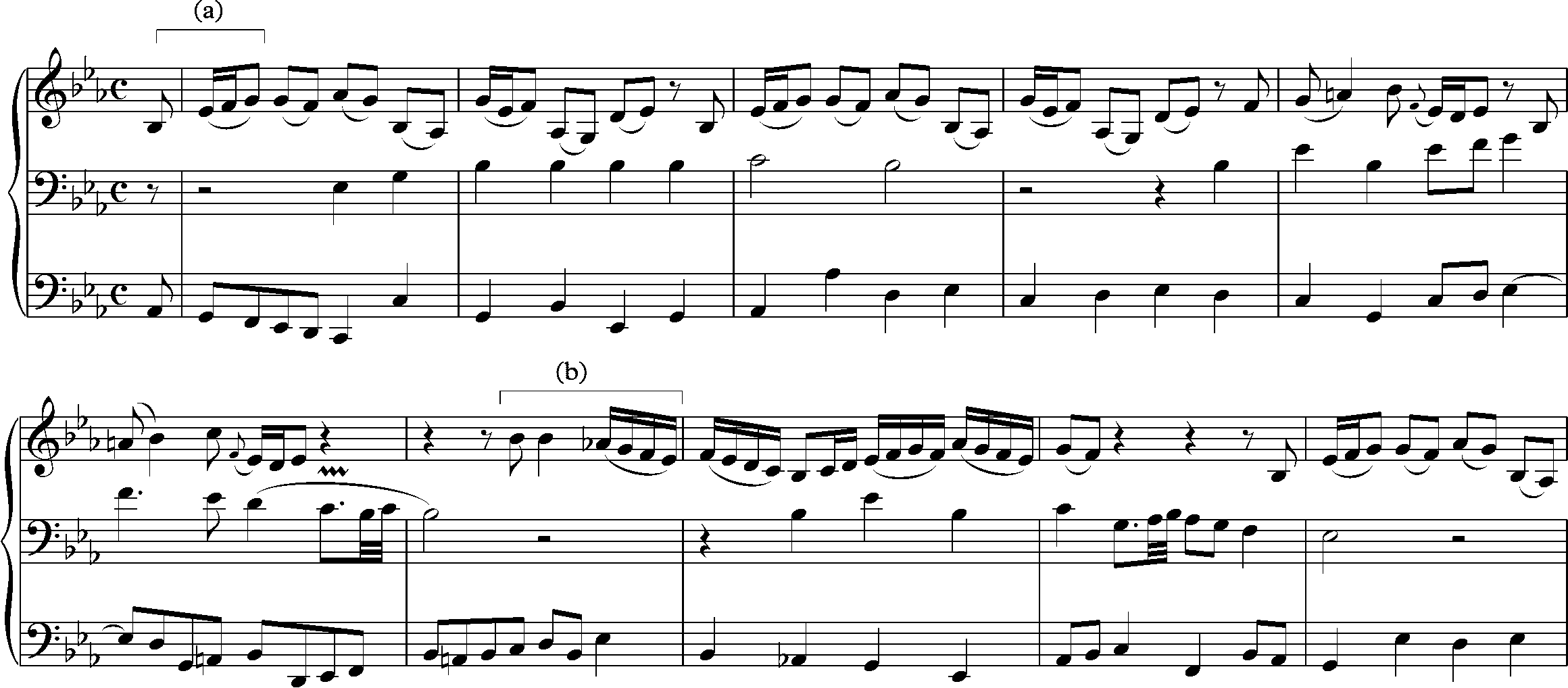
BWV 645 (excerpt)

Wachet auf, ruft uns die Stimme, BWV 645.

==== Chorale melody ====
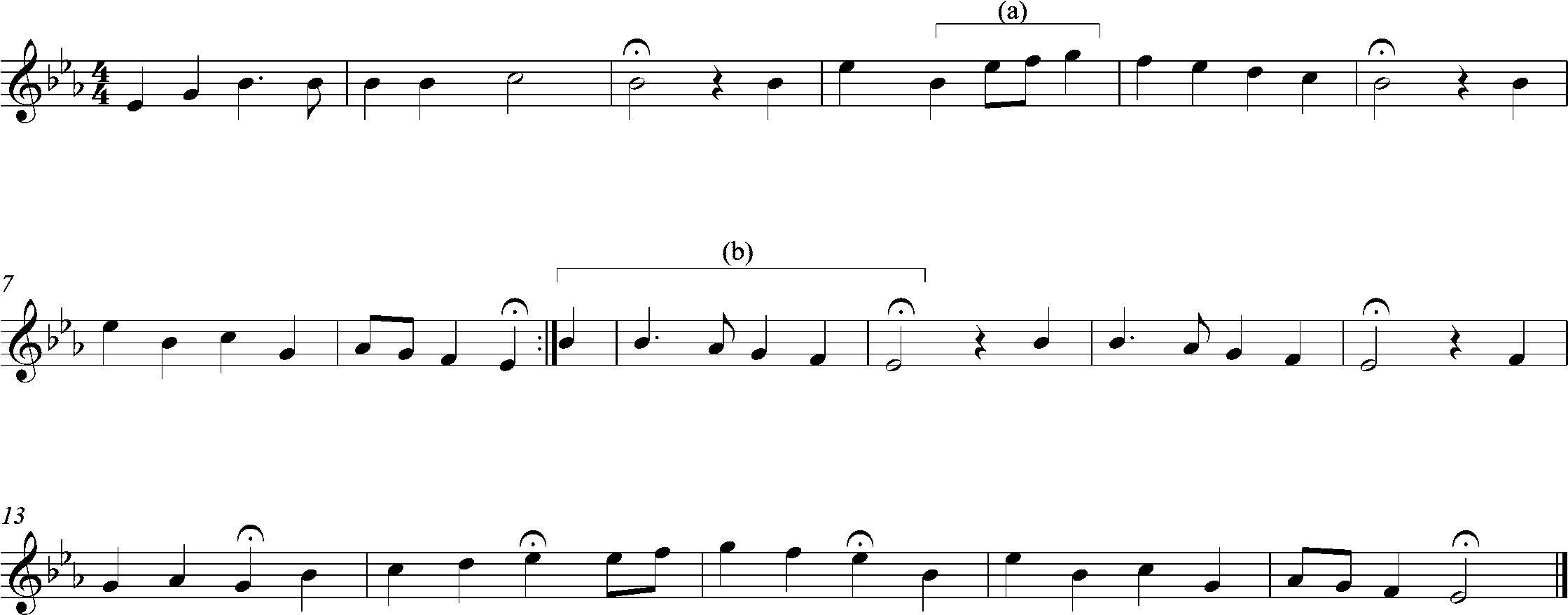
Hymn tune of BWV 645

The hymn tune of this chorale prelude is "Wachet auf, ruft uns die Stimme" ("Wake, Awake for Night is Passing"), Zahn No. 8405.

==== Model ====
From Wachet auf, ruft uns die Stimme, BWV 140
4. "Zion hört die Wächter singen"
performed by MIT Concert Choir (Cutter)

The chorale prelude is a transcription of "Zion hört die Wächter singen" ("Zion hears the watchmen sing"), the 4th movement of the cantata Wachet auf, ruft uns die Stimme, BWV 140, which is a chorale for tenor voice accompanied by unison strings and continuo.

=== Wo soll ich fliehen hin (or) Auf meinen lieben Gott, BWV 646 ===
Wo soll ich fliehen hin (or) Auf meinen lieben Gott, BWV 646.

==== Chorale melody ====
Hymn tune: "Wo soll ich fliehen hin" ("Whither shall I flee?"), or, "Auf meinen lieben Gott", Zahn No. 2164.

==== Model ====
Since no model has been found for BWV 646, most scholars assume that the source cantata is one of the 100 or so believed to have been lost. The trio scoring of the movement suggests the original may have been for violin, or possibly violins and violas in unison (right hand), and continuo (left hand), with the chorale (pedal) sung by soprano or alto.

=== Wer nur den lieben Gott lässt walten, BWV 647 ===
Wer nur den lieben Gott lässt walten, BWV 647.

==== Chorale melody ====
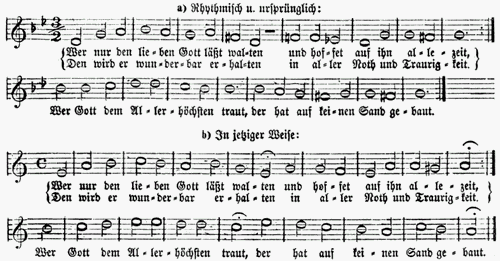
Hymn tune of BWV 647

Hymn tune: "Wer nur den lieben Gott läßt walten" ("Who allows God alone to rule him"), Zahn No. 2778.

==== Model ====
Arranged from Wer nur den lieben Gott läßt walten, BWV 93, movement 4 (duet for soprano and alto).

=== Meine Seele erhebt den Herren, BWV 648 ===
Meine Seele erhebt den Herren, BWV 648.

==== Chorale melody ====
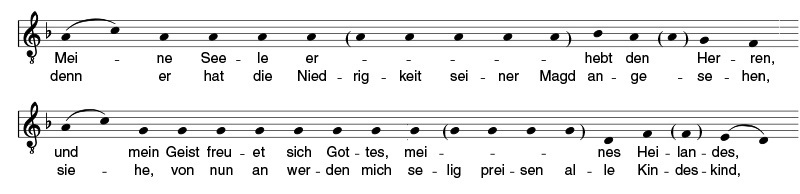
Tune of BWV 648

Tune: "Meine Seele erhebt den Herren" ("My soul doth magnify the Lord"), a German variant of the tonus peregrinus or ninth psalm tone.

==== Model ====
Arranged from Meine Seel erhebt den Herren, BWV 10, movement 5 (duet for alto and tenor, chorale instrumental).

=== Ach bleib bei uns, Herr Jesu Christ, BWV 649 ===
Ach bleib bei uns, Herr Jesu Christ, BWV 649.

==== Chorale melody ====
Hymn tune: "Ach bleib bei uns, Herr Jesu Christ" ("Lord Jesus Christ, with us abide"), Zahn No. 493 (a.k.a. "Danket dem Herrn heut und allzeit").

==== Model ====
Arranged from Bleib bei uns, denn es will Abend werden, BWV 6, movement 3 (soprano chorale).

=== Kommst du nun, Jesu, vom Himmel herunter, BWV 650 ===
Kommst du nun, Jesu, vom Himmel herunter, BWV 650.

==== Chorale melody ====
Hymn tune: "Kommst du nun, Jesu, vom Himmel herunter auf Erden" ("Come thou, Jesu, from heaven to earth"), Zahn No. 1912a (a.k.a. "Hast du denn, Jesus, dein Angesicht gänzlich verborgen").

==== Model ====
Lobe den Herren, den mächtigen König der Ehren, BWV 137, movement 2 (alto solo).

== Reception ==
In Bach's Nekrolog the Schübler Chorales were listed as the fifth item, after the four Clavier-Übung volumes, among the composer's printed works: "Sechs dreystimmige Vorspiele, vor eben so viel Gesänge, für die Orgel" (lit. 'six three-part preludes, to as many hymns, for the organ'). In 1776 Johann Friedrich Köhler wrote admiringly about the chorales. Early Bach-biographies by Hiller (1784), Gerber (1790) and Forkel (1802) listed the six chorale preludes among Bach's printed works. Forkel added that they were "full of dignity and religious feeling", and mentioned that the registration was sometimes indicated by Bach in greater detail than usual, for example in the second chorale (BWV 646). At least seven manuscript copies of the preludes, based on the uncorrected or corrected original print, were realised before Breitkopf & Härtel republished them in the early 19th century.

In 1847 C. F. Peters published the six Schübler Chorales, edited by Griepenkerl and Roitzsch, as part of larger sets of chorale preludes. Biographers Schauer (1850), Hilgenfeldt (1850) and Bitter (1865) included the chorales in their overviews of Bach's compositions.

== Sources ==
Manuscripts (chronological)

- US-Wc ML30.8b.B2 M4 (Bach's autograph score containing BWV 10/5, composed for performance on 2 July 1724 – description at Bach Digital website; facsimile at Library of Congress website; RISM 000102323)
- D-LEb Thomana 10 (original performance parts, partially autograph, containing BWV 10/5, copied from the autograph score for its first performance on 2 July 1724 – description and facsimile at Bach Digital website; RISM 200020894)
- D-LEb Thomana 93, Fascicle 1 (original performance parts, partially autograph, containing BWV 93/4, copied for its first performance on 9 July 1724 – description and facsimile at Bach Digital website; RISM 200020910)
- D-B Mus. ms. Bach P 44, Fascicle 2 (Bach's autograph score containing BWV 6/3, composed for performance on 2 April 1725 – description and facsimile at Bach Digital website; facsimile at Berlin State Library website; RISM 467004402)
- D-B Mus. ms. Bach St 7 (original performance parts, partially autograph, containing BWV 6/3, copied from the autograph score for its first performance on 2 April 1725 – description and facsimile at Bach Digital website; facsimile at Berlin State Library website; RISM 467200700)
- D-LEb Thomana 137 (original performance parts, partially autograph, containing BWV 137/2, copied for its first performance on 19 August 1725 – description and facsimile at Bach Digital website; RISM 200020932)
- D-LEb Thomana 140 (original performance parts, partially autograph, containing BWV 140/4, copied for its first performance on 25 November 1731 – description and facsimile at Bach Digital website; RISM 200020935)
- US-PRscheide BWV 645-650 (original print of the Schübler Chorales with Bach's handwritten corrections and additions from before August 1748 – description at Bach Digital website)
- A-Wn SH J. S. Bach 40 (original print of the Schübler Chorales with handwritten corrections which Johann Christoph Oley copied from US-PRscheide BWV 645-650 before 1762 – description at Bach Digital website; facsimile at Austrian National Library website)

Publications

- Bach, Johann Sebastian (1747–1748). Sechs Chorale von verschiedener Art: auf einer Orgel mit 2 Clavieren und Pedal vorzuspielen. Zella St. Blasii: Johann Georg Schübler. (D-LEb Peters PM 5694: facsimile and description of the original print at Bach Digital website; RISM 00000990003418)
- Breig, Werner (2010). "Introduction " (pp. 14, 17–18), pp. 101–113 (score) and "Commentary " (pp. 9–12) in Vol. 6: Clavierübung III, Schübler-Chorales, Canonische Veränderungen of Johann Sebastian Bach: Complete Organ Works. Breitkopf.
- Grace, Harvey (1922). The Organ Works of Bach. London: Novello & Co, pp. 252–260.
- Griepenkerl, Friedrich Konrad; Roitzsch, Ferdinand August (1847). "Ach bleib bei uns, Herr Jesu Christ" in Vol. 6 and "Kommst du nun, Jesu, vom Himmel herunter", "Meine Seele erhebt den Herren", "Wachet auf, ruft uns die Stimme", "Wer nur den lieben Gott läßt walten", "Wo soll ich fliehen hin (oder: Auf meinen lieben Gott)" in Vol. 7 of Johann Sebastian Bach's Compositionen für die Orgel: Kritisch-korrecte Ausgabe. Leipzig: C. F. Peters.
- Löhlein, Heinz-Harald (1983: Score / 1987: Critical Commentary). "Sechs Choräle von verschiedener Art (Schübler-Choräle)", pp. 86–103 (Score) and pp. 127-172 (Critical Commentary) in Vol. 1: Orgelbüchlein – Six Chorales of Different Kinds (Schübler Chorales) – Chorale Partitas of Series IV: Organ Works of the New Bach Edition. Bärenreiter
- Nies-Berger, Édouard; Schweitzer, Albert (1967). Johann Sebastian Bach: Schübler chorales - Eighteen chorales - Chorale variations, Vol. VIII of Complete Organ Works: a critico-practical edition in eight volumes. New York: G. Schirmer.
- Rust, Wilhelm (1878). "Vorwort" (pp. V–IX, XV–XIX) and "II. Sechs Choräle von verschiedener Art", pp. 61–76 in Joh. Seb. Bach's Orgelwerke: Zweiter Band, Vol. 25.2 of the Bach-Gesellschaft Ausgabe. Leipzig: Breitkopf & Härtel.
- Schweitzer, Albert (1935). J. S. Bach – Vol. 1 London: A. & C. Black, pp. 282, 294.
- Schweitzer, Albert (1995). Die Orgelwerke Johann Sebastian Bachs: Vorworte zu den "Sämtlichen Orgelwerken". Georg Olms Verlag. ISBN 9783487416977, pp. 99–102
- Spitta, Philipp, translated by Clara Bell and J. A. Fuller Maitland (1899). Johann Sebastian Bach: His Work and Influence on the Music of Germany, 1685–1750. Novello & Co. Vol. 3: p. 219 and endnote No. 9 p. 294
- Stauffer, George B. (2016). "Noch ein „Handexemplar“: Der Fall der Schübler-Choräle", pp. 177–192 in Bach-Jahrbuch 2015 in Bach-Jahrbuch, edited by Peter Wollny. Leipzig: Evangelische Verlagsanstalt. ISBN 978-3374043200
- Stinson, Russell (2012). J. S. Bach at His Royal Instrument: Essays on His Organ Works. OUP USA. ISBN 9780199917235, p. 14.
- Terry, Charles Sanford (1921). Bach's Chorals – Part III: The Hymns and Hymn Melodies of the Organ Works. Cambridge University Press, pp. 70–74, 314–316, 341–345, 324–327, 260–261, 83–85, 246–248
- Williams, Peter (1985). "645–650 Schübler Chorales", pp. 103–123 in The Organ Music of J. S. Bach: II BWV 599–771, etc.. Cambridge: Cambridge University Press. ISBN 9780521317009.
- Williams, Peter (2003). "Schübler Chorales BWV 645–650", pp. 317–335 in The Organ Music of J. S. Bach. Cambridge: Cambridge University Press. ISBN 9780521891158.
