= Johann Christoph Oley =

German musician

- Born: 1 June 1738; Bernburg
- Baptised: 3 June 1738
- Died: 20 January 1789 (aged 50); Aschersleben
- Era: Baroque

Johann Christoph Oley (1738–1789) was a German organist and composer.

== Life ==
Nothing is known about Oley's early life, except that he was a son of Joachim Ernst Oley, a slater and brick-maker. In 1755 Johann Christoph became organist of the church of Bernburg, his home town, but in 1762 he moved to the church of St Stephan, Aschersleben, because of its more important organ. In order to improve his salary, he also took on the duties of assistant teacher at the church school. He remained at St Stephan until the end of his life. Contrary to earlier assumptions, it seems unlikely that Oley met J.S. Bach or was his pupil, but he was a copyist of Bach's keyboard works and a collector of Bach copies and prints (he owned one of the four extant copies of the Schübler Chorales).

== Works ==
Only two publications of Oley's works have survived:

- 14 variations on a polonaise for keyboard (Nuremberg, about 1767)
- Various chorales for the organ (Quedlinburg, 1773), containing 77 settings for organ solo, two for solo oboe and organ, and six for organ and instrumental ensemble
