= Meine Seele erhebt den Herren =

Martin Luther's translation of the Magnificat canticle

Meine Seele erhebt den Herren (My soul magnifies the Lord) is Martin Luther's translation of the Magnificat canticle. It is traditionally sung to a German variant of the tonus peregrinus, a rather exceptional psalm tone in Gregorian chant. The tonus peregrinus (or ninth tone) is associated with the ninth mode or Aeolian mode. For the traditional setting of Luther's German Magnificat that is the minor mode for which the last note of the melodic formula is the tonic, a fifth below its opening note.

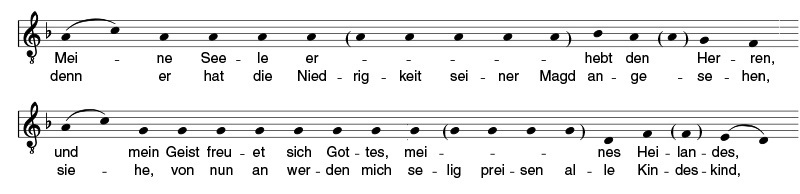
Traditional D minor setting of Luther's German Magnificat, which is a particular German version of the ninth tone or tonus peregrinus

== Traditional setting ==
The tonus peregrinus is an exceptional psalm tone in Gregorian chant: there it was most clearly associated with Psalm 113, traditionally sung in vespers. In Lutheranism, the tonus peregrinus is associated with the Magnificat (also usually sung in vespers): the traditional setting of Luther's German translation of the Magnificat ("Meine Seele erhebt den Herren") is a German variant of the tonus peregrinus. Typical for all German variants of the tonus peregrinus, it starts with the same note as the tenor and then moves a minor third up before returning to the tenor note. Particular for the version associated with Luther's German translation of the Magnificat is that the same two notes are repeated at the start of the second half of the melodic formula.

== Usage by various composers ==
Johann Sebastian Bach adopted text and/or melody of Luther's German Magnificat in various compositions:

- Magnificat (instrumental cantus firmus in No. 10: "suscepit Israel")
- Cantata BWV 10 (German Magnificat)
- Chorale harmonisations BWV 323 ("Gott sei uns gnädig und barmherzig" text) and 324
- Fourth Schübler Chorale, BWV 648, which is an organ transcription of the fifth movement of BWV 10.

Also in BWV 733, Fuga sopra il Magnificat, the melodic formula is used as a theme: this chorale prelude may however be the work of Bach pupil Johann Ludwig Krebs.

Other German Baroque composers that adopted Luther's German Magnificat in their compositions include Johann Hermann Schein, Samuel Scheidt, Heinrich Schütz, Johann Pachelbel, Dietrich Buxtehude, Johann Gottfried Walther and Johann Mattheson.

== Sources ==
- Mattias Lundberg. Tonus Peregrinus: The History of a Psalm-tone and its use in Polyphonic Music Ashgate Publishing, Ltd., 2012 ISBN 1409455076 ISBN 9781409455073
