= Wer nur den lieben Gott läßt walten =

1641 hymn by Geork Neumark

- German Christian hymn by Georg Neumark
- English: He who allows dear God to rule
- Catalogue: Zahn 2778
- Written: 1641
- Language: German
- Published: 1657

Organ recording of the hymn

"Wer nur den lieben Gott läßt walten" (He who allows dear God to rule) is a 1641 hymn by Georg Neumark, who also composed the melody for it. It has seven verses and deals with the Christian putting their trust in God. Its author referred to it as a "Trostlied" or song of consolation and it first appeared in his Fortgepflantzer musikalisch-poetischer Lustwald (published in Jena in 1657). It also appeared in Johann Crüger's 1672 Praxis pietatis melica and in the first part of Johann Anastasius Freylinghausen's 1704 Geistreiches Gesangbuch. It has inspired musical settings, and is part of current German hymnals, both Protestant and Catholic.

== Text ==
Neumark's original German text with the English translation of Catherine Winkworth:

Wer nur den lieben Gott läst walten
Und hoffet auf Ihn allezeit
Der wird Ihn wunderlich erhalten
In aller Noht und Traurigkeit.
Wer Gott dem Allerhöchsten traut
Der hat auf keinen Sand gebaut.

Was helfen uns die schweren Sorgen?
Was hilft uns unser Weh und Ach?
Was hilft es daß wir alle Morgen
Beseuftzen unser Ungemach?
Wir machen unser Kreutz und Leid
Nur größer durch die Traurigkeit.

Man halte nur ein wenig stille
Und sey doch in sich selbst vergnügt
Wie unsres Gottes Gnadenwille
Wie sein’ Allwissenheit es fügt
Gott der uns Ihm hat auserwehlt
Der weis auch sehr wohl was uns fehlt.

Er kennt die rechte Freudenstunden
Er weis wohl wenn es nützlich sey
Wenn Er uns nur hat treu erfunden
Und merket keine Heucheley.
So kömmt Gott eh wir uns versehn
Und lesset uns viel Guts geschehn.

Denk nicht in deiner Drangsalshitze
Daß du von Gott verlassen seyst
Und daß Gott der im Schoße sitze
Der sich mit stetem Glükke speist.
Die Folgezeit verändert viel
Und setzet Jeglichem sein Ziel.

Es sind ja Gott sehr schlechte Sachen
Und ist dem Höchsten alles gleich
Den Reichen klein und arm zu machen
Den Armen aber groß und reich.
Gott ist der rechte Wundermann
Der bald erhöhn bald stürtzen kan.

Sing bet und geh auf Gottes Wegen
Verricht das Deine nur getreu
Und trau des Himmels reichem Segen
So wird Er bey dir werden neu.
Denn Welcher seine Zuversicht
Auf Gott setzt den verläst Er nicht.

If thou but suffer God to guide thee,
And hope in Him through all thy ways,
He'll give thee strength, whate'er betide thee.
And bear thee through the evil days.
Who trusts in God's unchanging love
Builds on the rock that naught can move.

What can these anxious cares avail thee,
These never-ceasing moans and sighs?
What can it help, if thou bewail thee,
O'er each dark moment as it flies?
Our cross and trials do but press
The heavier for our bitterness.

Only be still and wait His leisure
In cheerful hope, with heart content
To take whate'er thy Father's pleasure
And all-deserving love hath sent,
Nor doubt our inmost wants are known
To Him Who chose us for His own.

He knows the time for joy, and truly
Will send it when He sees it meet.
When He hath tried and purged thee throughly
And finds thee free from all deceit;
He comes to thee all unaware
And makes thee own His loving care.

Nor think amid the heat of trial
That God hath cast thee off unheard,
That He whose hopes meet no denial
Must surely be of God preferred;
Time passes and much change doth bring,
And sets a bound to everything.

All are alike before the Highest.
'Tis easy to our God, we know.
To raise thee up, though low thou liest,
To make the rich man poor and low;
True wonders still by Him are wrought
Who setteth up and brings to nought.

Sing, pray, and keep His ways unswerving.
So do thine own part faithfully.
And trust His word; though undeserving,
Thou yet shalt find it true for thee —
God never yet forsook at need
The soul that trusted Him indeed.

== Neumark's 1657 hymnbook ==
In his 1657 hymnbook, Fortgepflantzter musikalisch-poetischer Lustwald, Neumark devoted five pages to the text, a prelude, melody and accompaniment of the hymn "Wer nur den lieben Gott läßt walten".

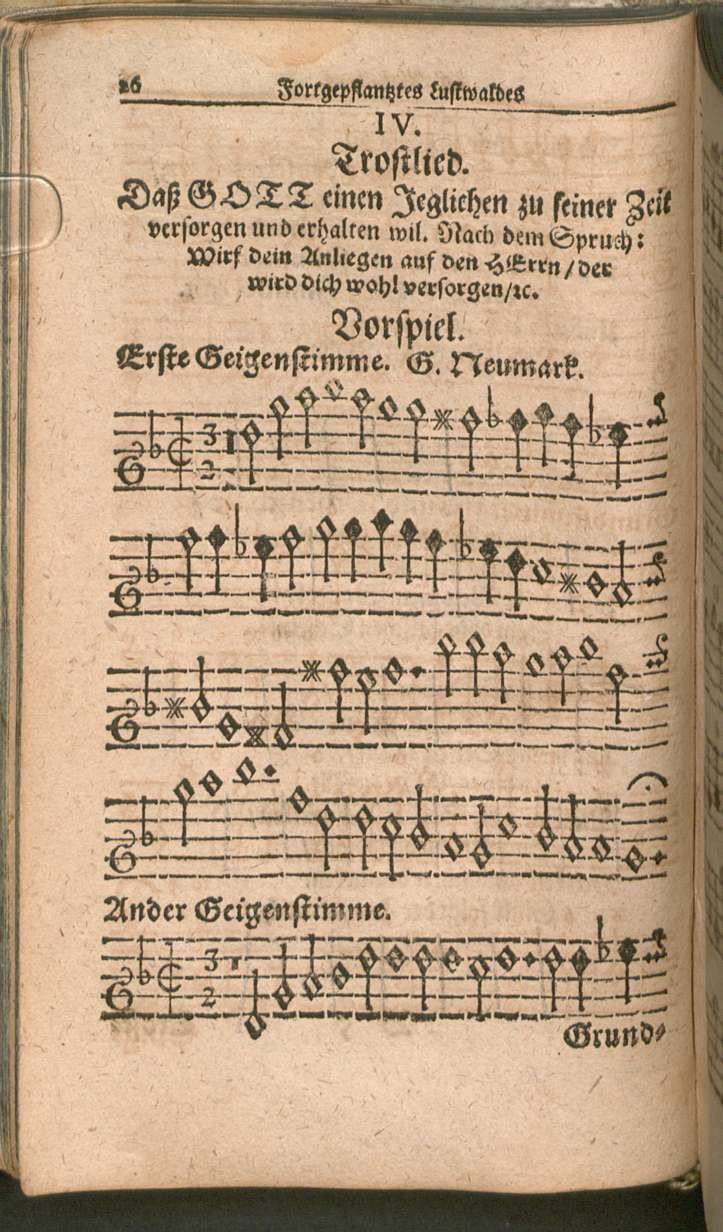
1st page, instrumental introduction, violin 1, beginning of violin 2

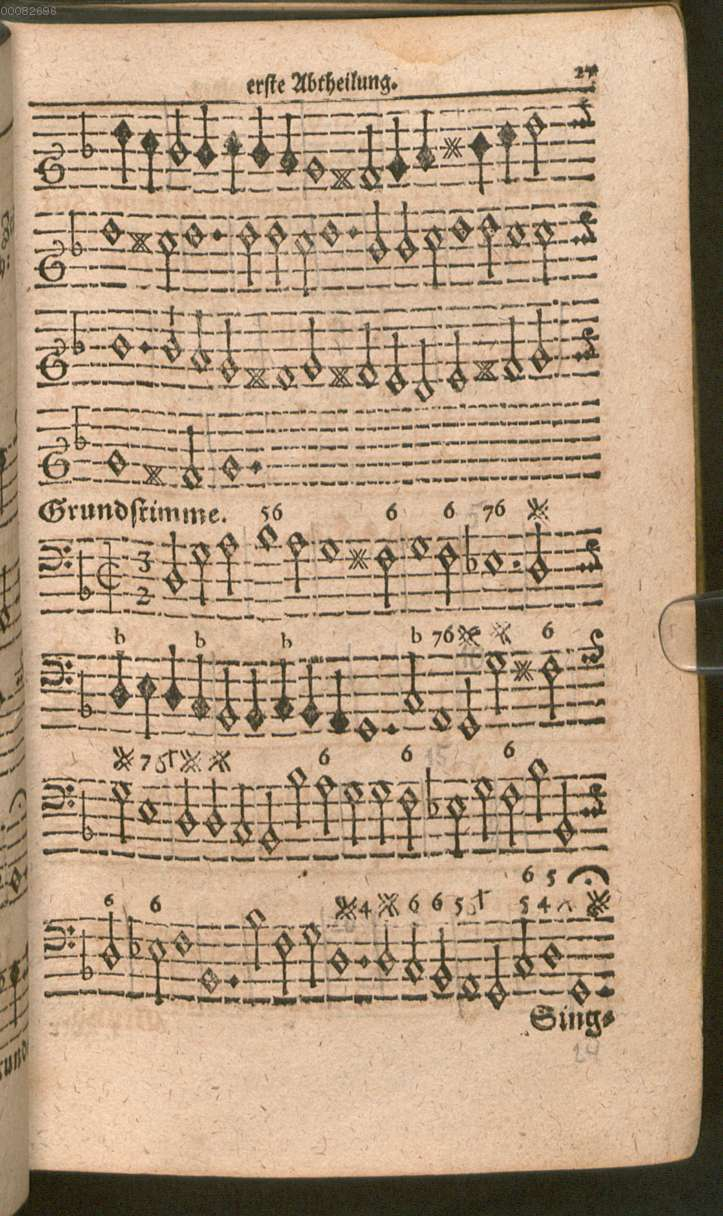
2nd page, violin 2 continued, figured bass

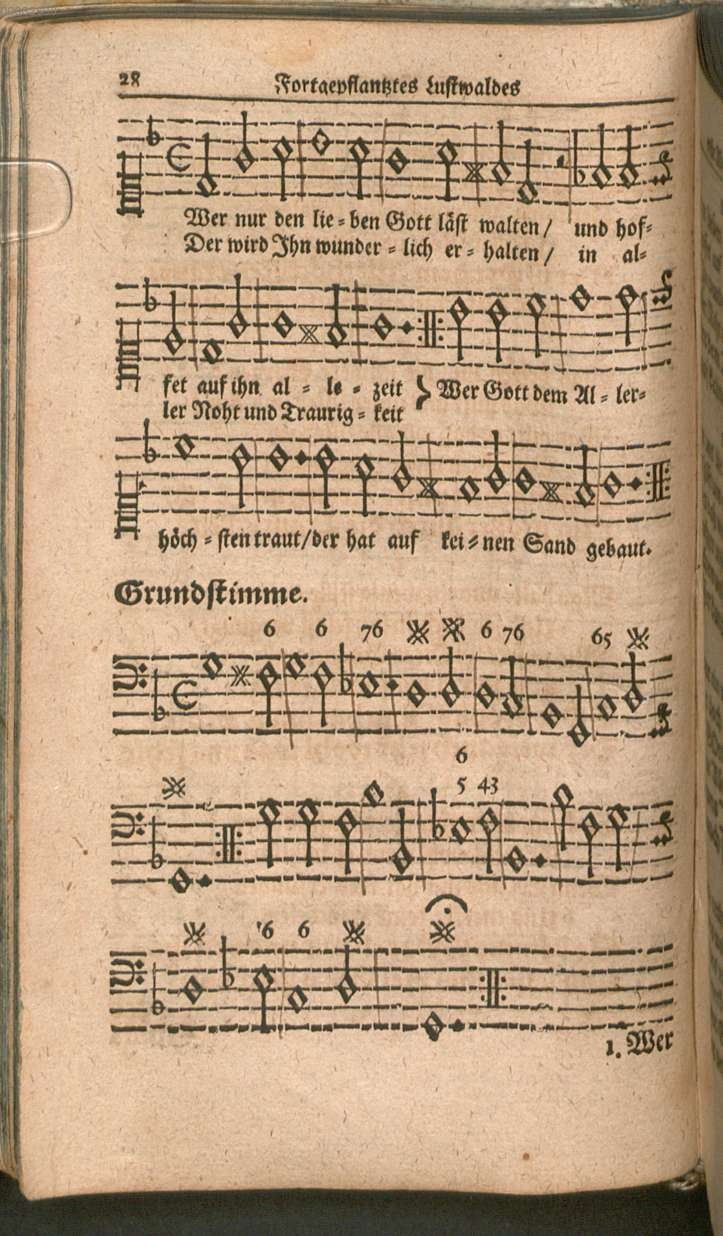
3rd page, melody with text of the first stanza, figured bass

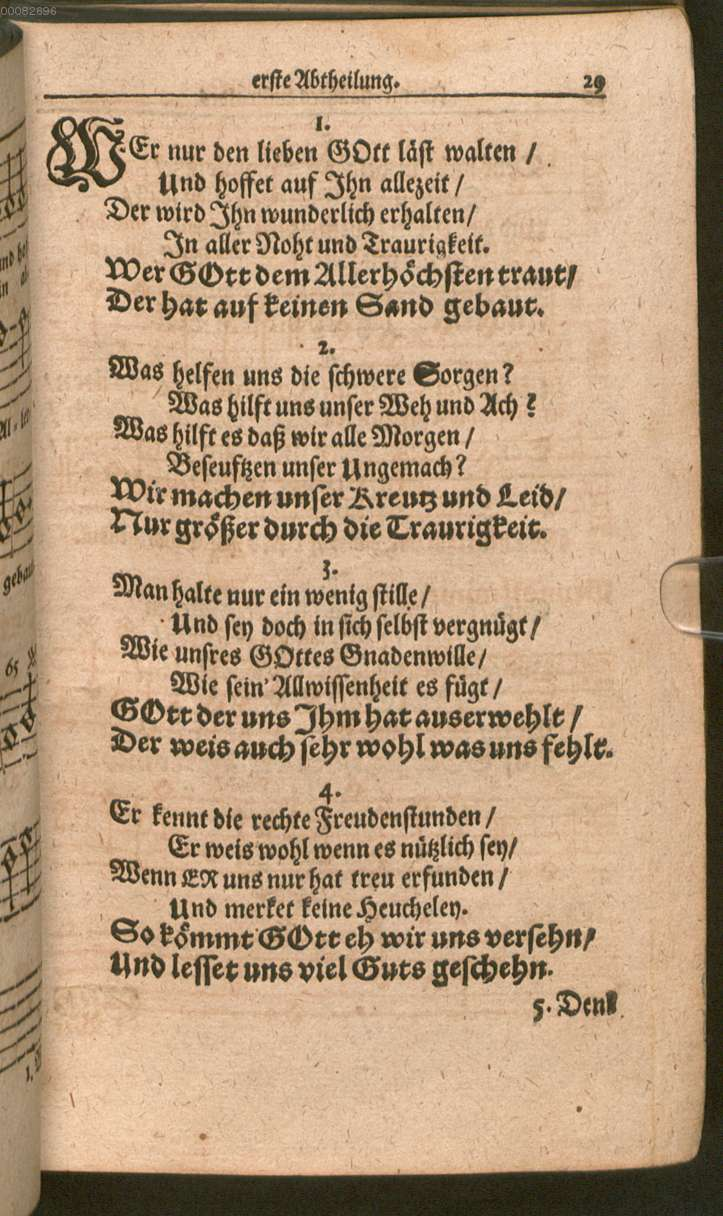
4th page, text of stanzas 1–4

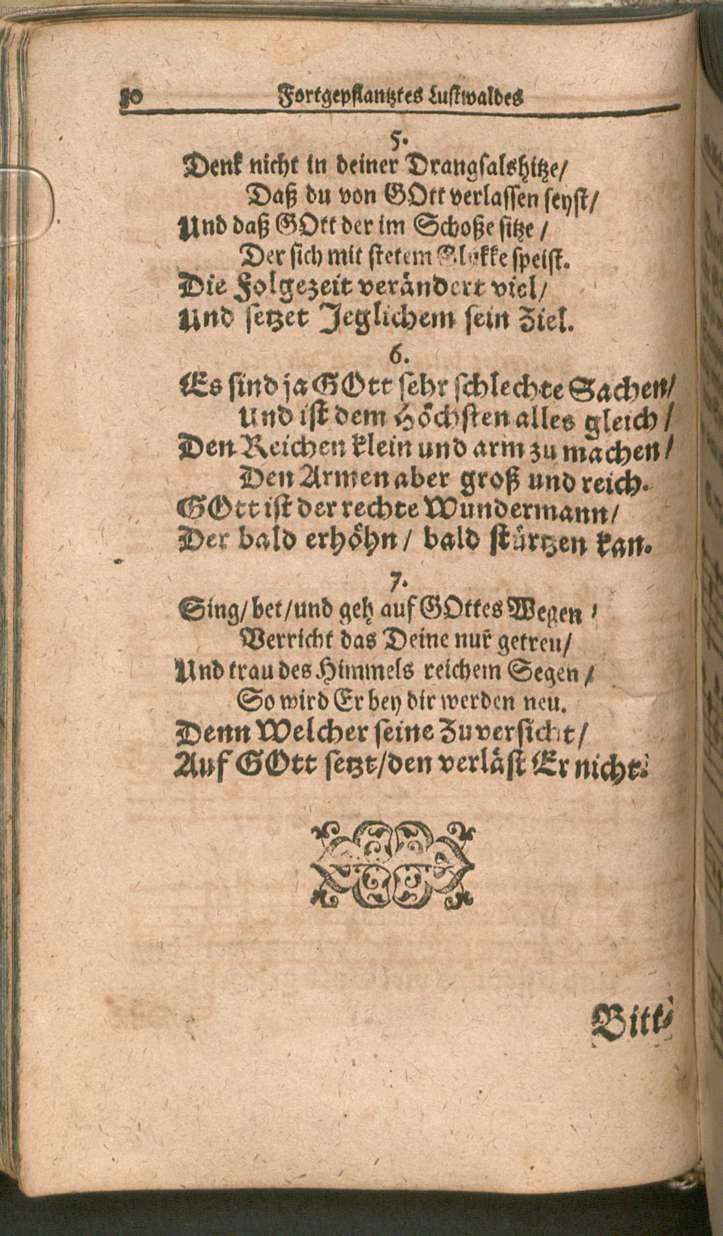
5th page, text of stanzas 5–7

== Melody ==
Twenty other melodies have since been written for the text, though none have reached the same popularity as the original, Zahn No. 2778. The original melody has a wide usage in Protestant hymnody, including several other texts. Neumark's original is in the dorian mode, although later settings, such as by Bach, render this into G harmonic minor.

Melody in 3/2 time by Georg Neumark 1657

In 4/4 time used by J. S. Bach

== Use in musical compositions ==
After it was written, the hymn tune has frequently been used by baroque composers. These include cantatas by Johann Samuel Welter and Georg Philipp Telemann as well as chorale preludes by Georg Friedrich Kauffmann, Johann Gottfried Walther and Georg Böhm. Christoph Graupner, a close colleague of Telemann, composed numerous cantatas based on the chorale, including GWV 1148/44 and GWV 1156/09.

Johann Sebastian Bach repeatedly used the hymn tune in his compositions, most notably in BWV 93, his cantata of the same name, for the fifth Sunday after Trinity, composed for 9 July 1724. Its text is based on Neumark's original, which is retained verbatim in the first and last verses and rewritten elsewhere. The same melody was set to different words in other hymns, notably "Wer weiß, wie nahe mir mein Ende" ("Who knows how near is my end?"). Cantatas BWV 21, BWV 27, BWV 84, BWV 88, BWV 166, BWV 179 and BWV 197 use the original melody, with words taken from one or other of the texts. Cantata 21 links two stanzas with a three-part fugue (Sei nun wieder zufrieden, meine Seele); the tenor and soprano sing the cantus firmus.

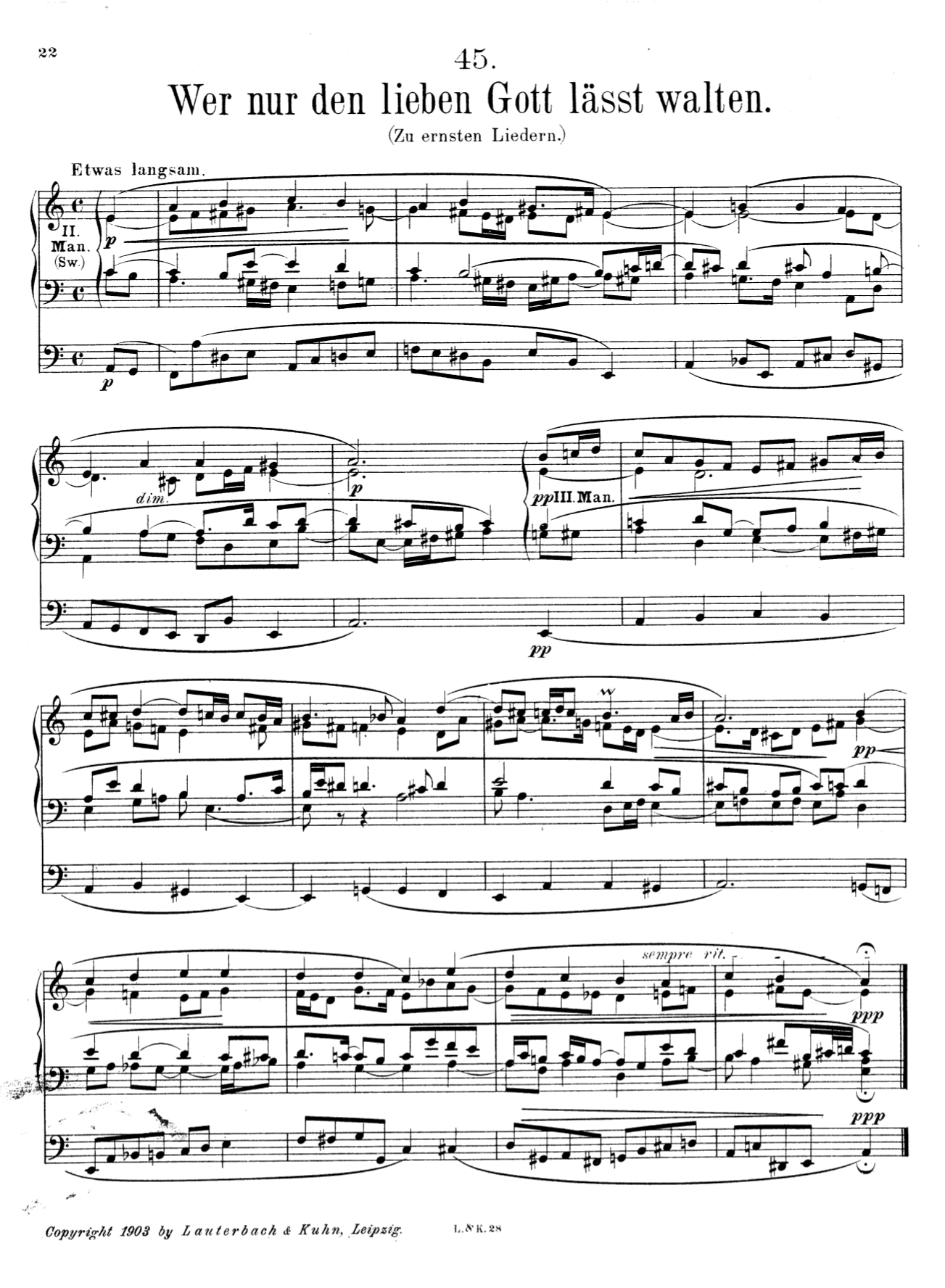
"Wer nur den lieben Gott lässt walten", Op. 67, no. 45, by Max Reger

BWV 642 in the Orgelbüchlein is an organ chorale prelude, with the hymn tune as its cantus firmus; whilst BWV 647 in the Schübler Chorales is an organ transcription of the fourth movement of the cantata BWV 93. In addition, two organ adaptations of the hymn are included in the Kirnberger Collection – BWV 690 (with a following figured basso-chorale) and BWV 691 (with an interesting variant and additional interludes). Another variant BWV 691a can be found in the Klavierbüchlein für Wilhelm Friedemann Bach.

After Bach and his forebears, there have been numerous arrangements of the hymn, in the eighteenth century and beyond. Organ preludes on the theme have been composed by Johann Peter Kellner, Johann Ludwig Krebs, Gottfried August Homilius and Johann Kirnberger.

Amongst later generations, Felix Mendelssohn adapted the text and melody for a cantata, while Johannes Brahms used it as a theme at various points in his Deutsches Requiem. Franz Liszt arranged the melody for piano as no. 11 of his Zwölf alte deutsche geistliche Weisen, S. 504b (1878–1879). Max Reger composed three organ preludes on the hymn: nos. 45 and 46 of his 52 chorale preludes, Op. 67 (1902); and no. 28 of his 30 short chorale preludes, Op. 135a (1914).

== Current hymnals ==
The hymn is no. 369 in the Protestant hymnal Evangelisches Gesangbuch, and no. 367 in the hymnbook of the Evangelisch-methodistische Kirche in Germany, though in the latter verse 5 is omitted. In the German hymnbook of the Neuapostolische Kirche, stanzas 1–5 and 7 appear as number 154.

The hymn became part of the 1938 Kirchenlied. Three stanzas were included in the first edition of the Catholic hymnal Gotteslob as GL 295. The same stanzas (1, 2 and 7) are number 451 in the Swiss Katholisches Gesangbuch der deutschsprachigen Schweiz. In the Gotteslob of 2013, stanzas 1–3, 6 and 7 appear as GL 424.

The tune of "Wer nur den lieben Gott" has also been used for a variety of other texts.
