= Tonus peregrinus =

Psalm tone in Gregorian chant

The tonus peregrinus, also known as the wandering tone, or the ninth tone, is a psalm tone used in Gregorian chant.

== Characteristics ==
As a reciting tone the tonus peregrinus does not fit in any of the original eight church modes, because a verse recited in this tone has a different tenor note in the first half of the verse from the second half of the verse. It is this diversion from a single recitation note which gives the name peregrinus, literally "wandering".

Traditionally, the tenor note in the first half of a verse sung according to the tonus peregrinus is a tone higher than the tenor note in the second half of the verse. Also usually the last note of a tonus peregrinus melodic formula is a perfect fifth below the first tenor note.

== History ==
In Gregorian chant the tonus peregrinus existed before the modal system was expanded beyond the eighth mode. Later the ninth tone became associated with the ninth mode, or Aeolian mode, which, in a more modern understanding of harmony, can be equalled with a standard minor mode.

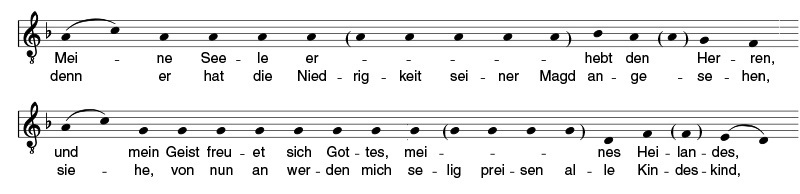
The traditional German Magnificat, sung on a German variant of the ninth tone or tonus peregrinus

The tonus peregrinus is an exceptional reciting tone in Gregorian chant: there it was most clearly associated with Psalm 113 (in the Vulgate numbering), traditionally sung in vespers. In Lutheranism, the tonus peregrinus is associated with the Magnificat (also usually sung in vespers): the traditional setting of Luther's German translation of the Magnificat ("Meine Seele erhebt den Herren") is a German variant of the tonus peregrinus.

== Musical settings ==
Tonus peregrinus variants appear in:

- "Suscepit Israel" from the Magnificat in D major by Johann Sebastian Bach
- Requiem by Wolfgang Amadeus Mozart (used in the Introit)
- Miserere Mei, Deus by Gregorio Allegri
- Sonata No. 4, Op. 98, by Josef Rheinberger (harmonized version is used as the second theme in the opening movement)
