= Cross motif =

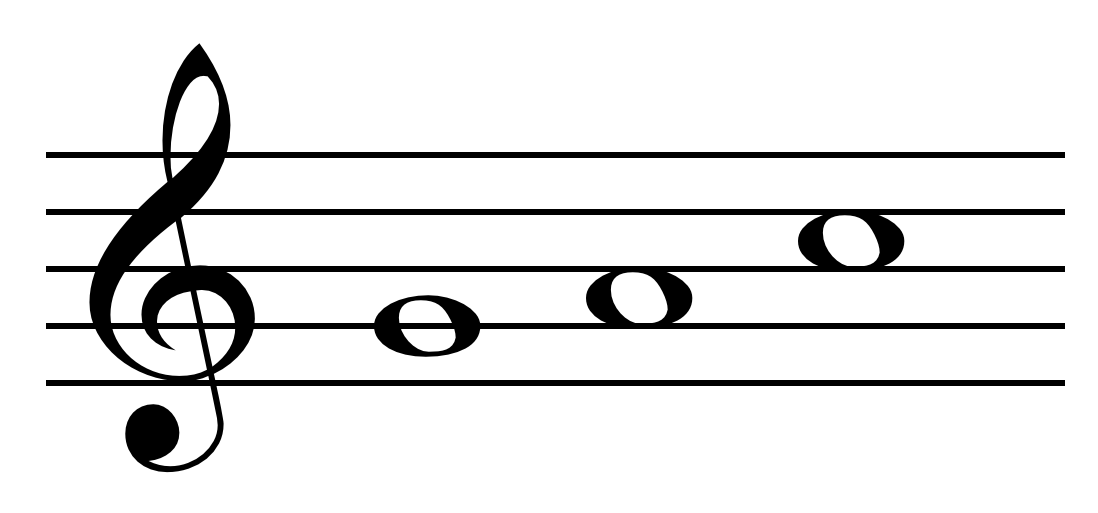
Liszt's cross motif.

In music, the cross motif is a motif.

A motif (Crux fidelis) was used by Franz Liszt to represent the Christian cross ('tonisches Symbol des Kreuzes' or tonic symbol of the cross) and taken from Gregorian melodies.

== See also ==
- Bach motif
- Cruciform#Cruciform melody
