= Wer nur den lieben Gott läßt walten, BWV 93 =

1724 chorale cantata by Johann Sebastian Bach

Wer nur den lieben Gott läßt walten
- BWV 93
- Chorale cantata by J. S. Bach
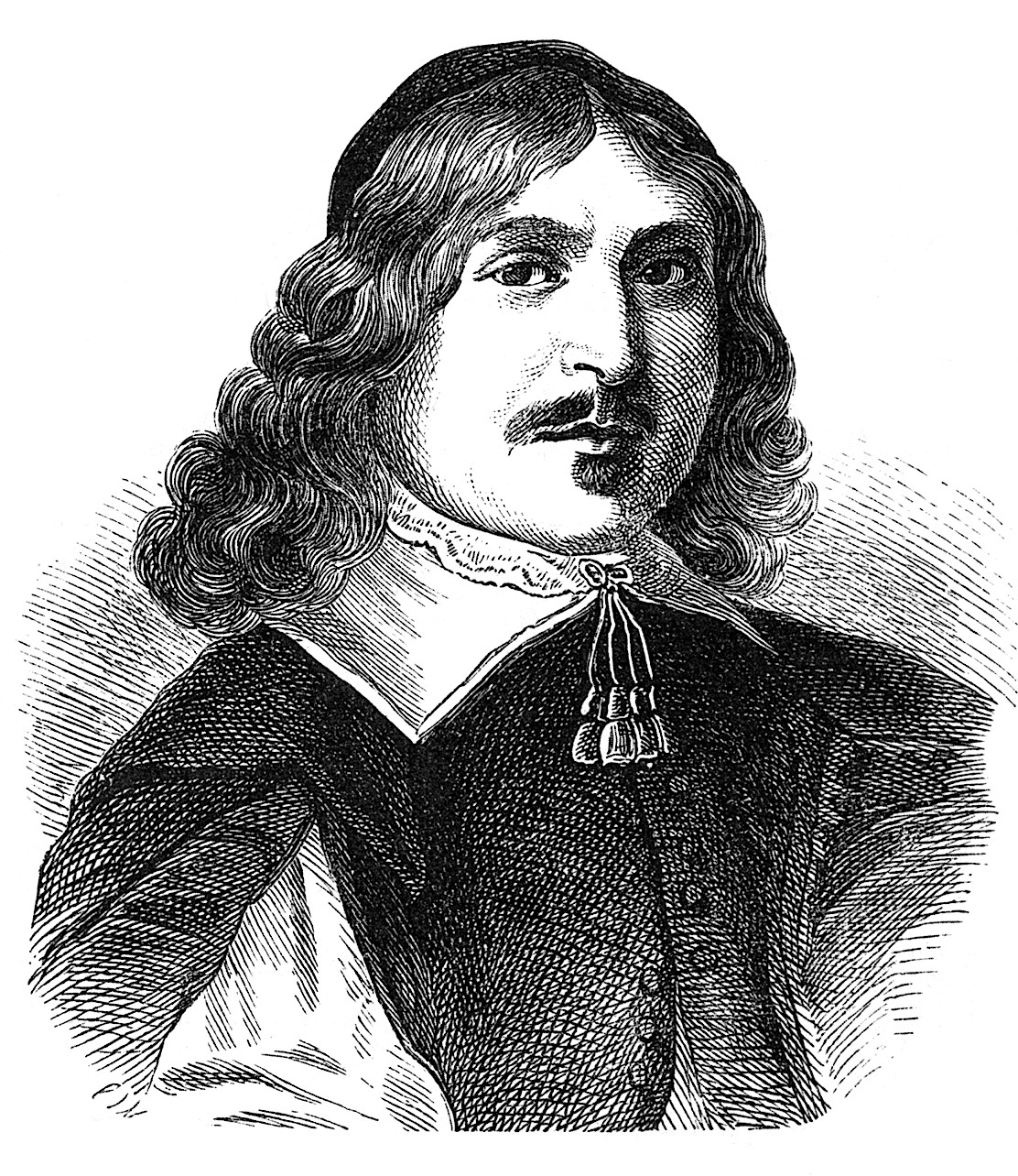
- Georg Neumark, author of the hymn
- Occasion: Fifth Sunday after Trinity
- Chorale: Wer nur den lieben Gott läßt walten
- Performed: 9 July 1724: Leipzig
- Movements: seven
- Vocal: SATB choir and solo
- Instrumental: 2 oboes; 2 violins; viola; viola da gamba; continuo

Johann Sebastian Bach composed the church cantata Wer nur den lieben Gott läßt walten (Who only lets dear God rule), BWV 93, in Leipzig for the fifth Sunday after Trinity and first performed it on 9 July 1724. It is part of his chorale cantata cycle, the second cantata cycle he started after being appointed Thomaskantor in 1723.

The cantata is based on the seven stanzas of the hymn "Wer nur den lieben Gott läßt walten" by Georg Neumark, published in 1657. The first and last stanza of the chorale were used for the outer movements of the cantata, while an unknown librettist paraphrased the inner stanzas of the hymn into the text for the five other movements. The first movement, a chorale fantasia, is followed by a succession of arias alternating with recitatives, leading to a four-part closing chorale and featuring a duet in the centre.

The cantata is scored for four soloists—soprano, alto, tenor and bass—a four-part choir, and a Baroque ensemble of two oboes, two violins, viola, viola da gamba and basso continuo.

== History ==
Bach composed the chorale cantata in 1724 as part of his second annual cycle for the Fifth Sunday after Trinity. Only continuo parts of the first four movements survived of the first performance. The manuscripts of the complete music date from another performance around 1732/1733, therefore it is unknown if the cantata had the same structure from the beginning.

The prescribed readings for the Sunday were from the First Epistle of Peter, "Sanctify the Lord God in your hearts" (1 Peter 3:8–15), and from the Gospel of Luke, Peter's great catch of fish (Luke 5:1–11. The cantata text is based on the chorale in seven stanzas of Georg Neumark, written in 1641 and published in 1657 in Fortgepflantzter Musikalisch-Poetischer Lustwald. The chorale is connected in general to the prescribed readings. Specific reference to the Gospel appears in the recitative addition of movement 5. The words of the chorale remain unchanged in movements 1, 4 and 7 in a symmetric arrangement. The changes in the other movements are the work of an unknown poet. In movements 2 and 5 he kept the original words but expanded them by recitatives, in movements 3 and 6 he transformed the ideas of the chorale to arias.

This chorale cantata is not to be confused with the chorale prelude of the same name, BWV 642. That chorale prelude, which is in the Orgelbüchlein collection, was also based upon the hymn by Georg Neumark.

== Scoring and structure ==
The cantata in seven movements is scored for four soloists—soprano, alto, tenor and bass—a four-part choir, two oboes, two violins, viola, viola da gamba and basso continuo.

1. Chorus: Wer nur den lieben Gott läßt walten
2. Recitative (+ chorale, bass): Was helfen uns die schweren Sorgen?
3. Aria (tenor): Man halte nur ein wenig stille
4. Duet aria (soprano, alto): Er kennt die rechten Freudenstunden
5. Recitative (+ chorale, tenor): Denk nicht in deiner Drangsalhitze
6. Aria (soprano): Ich will auf den Herren schaun
7. Chorale: Sing, bet und geh auf Gottes Wegen

== Music ==
In the central duet violins and violas play the melody of the chorale. Bach later arranged this movement for organ as one of the Schübler Chorales, BWV 647.

The opening chorus is a concerto of three elements: the orchestra, dominated by the two oboes, playing an introduction and ritornellos, the cantus firmus in the soprano, and the other voices which start each of the three sections and keep singing on the long final notes of the cantus firmus, soprano and alto opening the first section, tenor and bass the second, all four voices the last section.

Movements 2 and 5 are composed in the same fashion, alternating the slightly ornamented lines of the chorale with recitative.

In the first aria for tenor Bach uses a motive which turns the beginning of the chorale melody to major, to express trust in God. Johann David Heinichen used a similar major-mode variant, almost a very altered parody of Bach's, for the Recordare in his 1726 requiem in E-flat major, S. 18.

The cantata concludes with a four-part setting of the chorale's last stanza.

== Recordings ==
- J. S. Bach: Cantatas BWV 93 & BWV 131, Hans Thamm, Windsbacher Knabenchor, Consortium Musicum, Teresa Żylis-Gara, Ingeborg Ruß, Peter Schreier, Franz Crass, EMI Electrola 1966
- Bach Cantatas Vol. 3 – Ascension Day, Whitsun, Trinity, Karl Richter, Münchener Bach-Chor, Münchener Bach-Orchester, Edith Mathis, Anna Reynolds, Peter Schreier, Dietrich Fischer-Dieskau, Archiv Produktion 1975
- Die Bach Kantate Vol. 14, Helmuth Rilling, Gächinger Kantorei, Bach-Collegium Stuttgart, Arleen Auger, Ann Murray, Adalbert Kraus, Walter Heldwein, Hänssler 1979
- J. S. Bach: Das Kantatenwerk – Sacred Cantatas Vol. 5, Nikolaus Harnoncourt, Tölzer Knabenchor, Concentus Musicus Wien, soloist of the Tölzer Knabenchor, Paul Esswood, Kurt Equiluz, Ruud van der Meer, Teldec 1979
- J. S. Bach: Kantaten O ewiges Feuer, o Ursprung der Liebe BWV 34; Wer nur den lieben Gott läßt walten BWV 93; Was Gott tut, das ist wohlgetan BWV 100, Karl-Friedrich Beringer, Windsbacher Knabenchor, Consortium Musicum, Susanne Winter, Rebecca Martin, Markus Schäfer, Sebastian Bluth, Rondeau Production 1999
- J. S. Bach: Complete Cantatas Vol. 21, Ton Koopman, Amsterdam Baroque Orchestra & Choir, Deborah York, Franziska Gottwald, Paul Agnew, Klaus Mertens, Antoine Marchand 2000
- J. S. Bach: Cantatas for the Complete Liturgical Year Vol. 5, Sigiswald Kuijken, La Petite Bande, Siri Thornhill, Petra Noskaiová, Christoph Genz, Jan van der Crabben, Accent 2005
