= Georg Neumark =

German poet and composer of hymns

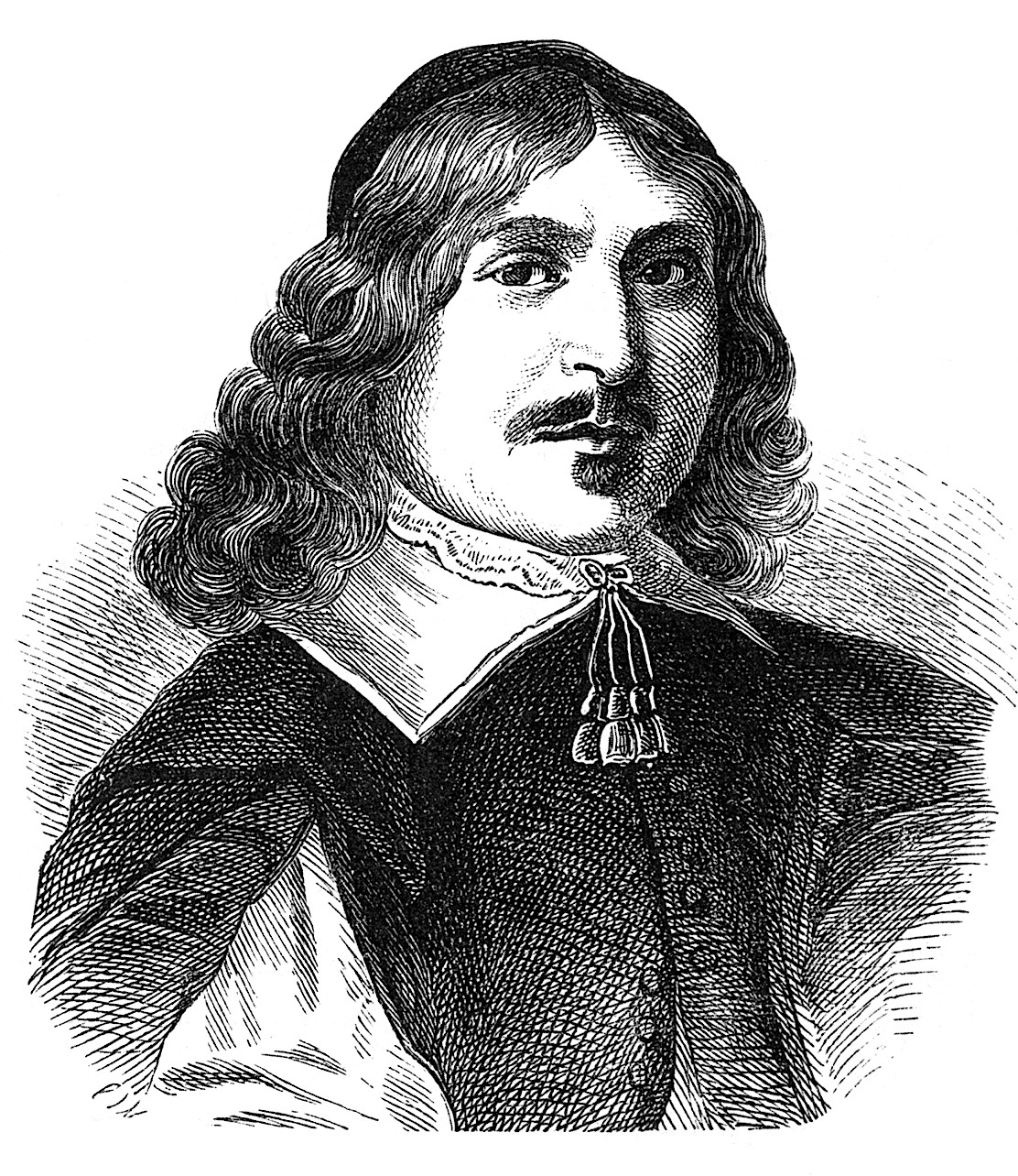
Georg Neumark in "Illustrierte Literaturgeschichte" (1880)

Georg Neumark (16 March 1621 – 8 July 1681) was a German poet and composer of hymns.

== Life ==
Neumark was born in Langensalza, the son of Michael Neumark and his wife Martha. From 1630 he attended the gymnasium in Schleusingen and later transferred to that of Gotha. In 1640 he began law studies at the University of Königsberg. Fleeing the tumult of war he took a position as tutor in Kiel. In 1643 he was able to return to Königsberg, where he devoted himself more and more to music, in which he was greatly supported by Simon Dach.

After graduating in law Neumark went first to Danzig and in 1649 to Thorn. Two years later, in 1651, he returned to his native Thuringia. There his uncle, councilor Plattner, introduced him to the duke Wilhelm IV of Saxe-Weimar, who appointed him Kanzleiregistrator and in 1652 librarian.

In the following year the duke brought Neumark into the Fruchtbringende Gesellschaft. He received the nickname der Sprossende (the sprouting) and the motto Nützlich und ergetzlich (useful and delightful), as well as the emblem Schwarzbraune gefüllte Nelken (dark-brown carnation). In 1656 he was elected Erzschreinhalter der Fruchtbringenden Gesellschaft (guardian of the shrine). His famous hymn Wer nur den lieben Gott läßt walten appeared in 1641.

The Pegnesische Blumenorden (a poet's society in Nürnberg named after the river Pegnitz) accepted Neumark as a member in 1679. He carried on an extensive but not untroubled correspondence with the society's president, Sigmund von Birken, who acted as his literary agent.

A writer of both sacred and secular poetry, he was considered one of the more imaginative composers of continuo songs of Baroque Music in Germany, with mostly secular texts, and some melodies considered the best of his time. Many songs have violin and gamba obbligatos and ritornellos, in which he likely played the gamba in his presentations of the songs. His choral Wer nur den lieben Gott lässt walten appears in Bach's cantata Gott ist uns`re Zuversicht, BWV 197.

On 8 July 1681, Neumark died at the age of 60 in Weimar, where he was interred in the Jacobsfriedhof. The Evangelical Church marks his memorial on 9 July.

== Selected works ==
- Wer nur den lieben Gott läßt walten, 1641, his most famous hymn, used by Johann Sebastian Bach in 1724 for his chorale cantata Wer nur den lieben Gott läßt walten, BWV 93
- Poetisch- und Musikalisches Lustwäldchen, Hamburg 1652
- Fortgepflantzter Musikalisch-Poetischer Lustwald, Jena 1657
- Christlicher Potentaten Ehren-Krohne, Jena 1675
- Poetisch-Historischer Lustgarten, Frankfurt/Main 1666
- Poetische Tafeln, oder gründliche Anweisung zur deutschen Verskunst, Nürnberg 1668
- Der Neu-Sprossende Teutsche Palmbaum, Nürnberg 1669
- Thränendes Haus-Kreutz, Weimar 1681 (Digitalisat)

== Bibliographies ==
- Gerhard Dünnhaupt: "Georg Neumark (1621–1681)", in: Personalbibliographien zu den Drucken des Barock, Bd. 4. Stuttgart: Hiersemann 1991, S. 2958–78. ISBN 3-7772-9122-6
