= Münchener Bach-Orchester =

German baroque orchestra

Münchener Bach-Orchester Munich Bach Orchestra
- Founded: 1954
- Location: Munich
- Principal conductor: Hansjörg Albrecht
- Website: www.muenchener-bachchor.de/orchester/

The Münchener Bach-Orchester (Munich Bach Orchestra) is a classical music ensemble based in Munich, Germany, which specialises in the performance of works by Johann Sebastian Bach performed on modern instruments. It was founded in 1954 by the conductor Karl Richter. It works closely with its partner vocal ensemble, the Münchener Bach-Chor.

== History ==
After Karl Richter founded the Münchener Bach-Chor in 1954, he formed the Münchener Bach-Orchester to provide the choir with instrumental accompaniment. The orchestra rapidly became established as a prominent international ensemble in its own right. The ensemble began touring around the world, putting on performances in Paris, Moscow, Tokyo and New York. Before historically informed performance practice gained popularity, Richter's orchestra was especially noted for its interpretations of the works of J. S. Bach and other Baroque composers. In addition to Baroque music, the orchestra has also performed works by Ludwig van Beethoven, Claudio Monteverdi and Sofia Gubaidulina.

The orchestra often performs in major Munich concert halls such as the Gasteig, the Herkulessaal and the Prinzregententheater, frequently along with the Münchener Bach-Chor (who also perform with the Bach Collegium München).

== Recordings ==
Numerous Münchener Bach-Orchester recordings have been made on the Deutsche Grammophon label, including collaborations with noted soloists such as Dietrich Fischer-Dieskau, Fritz Wunderlich, Edith Mathis and Maurice André.

In 1977, a Munich Bach Orchestra recording of the first movement from J. S. Bach's Brandenburg Concerto No. 2 directed by Richter was selected by NASA to be included on the Voyager Golden Record, a gold-plated copper record that was sent into space on the Voyager space craft. The record contained sounds and images which had been selected as examples of the diversity of life and culture on Earth.

In 2011, the Münchener Bach-Orchester recorded a new version of Gustav Mahler's Das Lied von der Erde arranged for chamber orchestra and four soloists.

== Conductors ==
Richter served as conductor of both the orchestra and the choir from 1954 until 1981. He was succeeded by Hanns-Martin Schneidt, who served as the artistic director from 1984 to 2001. Today, the ensembles are led by Hansjörg Albrecht.

The orchestra has also worked with a number of guest conductors, including Leonard Bernstein (who conducted Richter's memorial concert in 1981), Bruno Weil and Peter Schreier.
