= List of compositions by Johann Sebastian Bach =

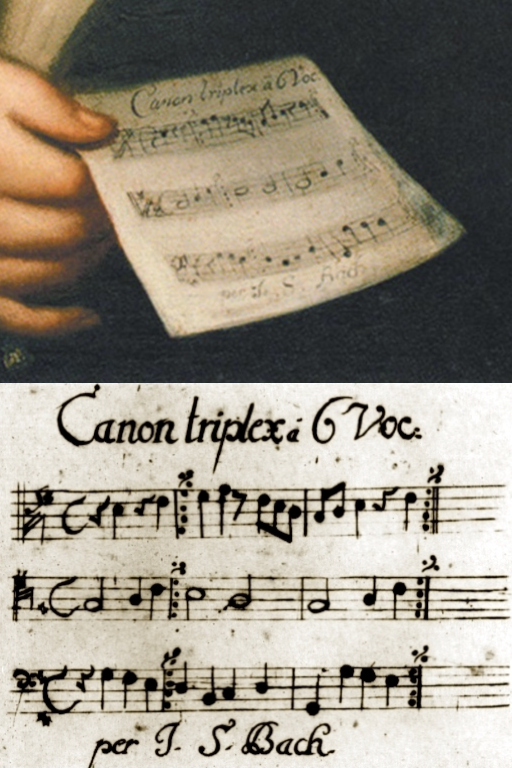
Canon triplex a 6: first printed in 1747 (below), it appears on both versions of the portrait Haussmann made of Bach (1746, 1748 – above). In the 19th-century Bach Gesellschaft edition the canon was published in Volume 45^{1}, p. 138. In 1950 the piece was assigned the number 1076 in Schmieder's catalogue of Bach's works (BWV). The 1998 edition of that catalogue (BWV^{2a}) mentions Haussmann's paintings as original sources for the work (p. 438), and likewise the Bach digital website gives a description of both paintings as sources for the piece (linked from Bach digital Work page 01262).

Johann Sebastian Bach's vocal music includes cantatas, motets, masses, Magnificats, Passions, oratorios, four-part chorales, songs and arias. His instrumental music includes concertos, suites, sonatas, fugues, and other works for organ, harpsichord, lute, violin, viola da gamba, cello, flute, chamber ensemble, and orchestra.

There are over 1,000 known compositions by Bach. Almost all are listed in the Bach-Werke-Verzeichnis (BWV), which is the best known and most widely used catalogue of Bach's compositions.

== Listing Bach's compositions ==
Some of the early biographies of Johann Sebastian Bach contain lists of his compositions. For instance, his obituary contains a list of the instrumental compositions printed during the composer's lifetime, followed by an approximate list of his unpublished work. The first separately published biography of the composer, by Johann Nikolaus Forkel, follows the same approach: its ninth chapter first lists printed works (adding four-part chorales which had been published in the second half of the 18th century), followed by a rough overview of the unpublished ones. In the first half of the 19th century more works were published, so the next biographies (Schauer and Hilgenfeldt in 1850) had more elaborate appendices listing printed works, referring to these works by publisher, and the number or page number given to the works in these publications. So, for example, the Prelude and Fugue in E♭ major can be indicated as "C. F. Peters Vol. III No. 1", or any of the variants ("Griepenkerl and Roitzsch Vol. 3 p. 2", "Peters Book 242 p. 2", "P. S. V., Cah. 3 (242), No. 1", etc.)

=== BG ===
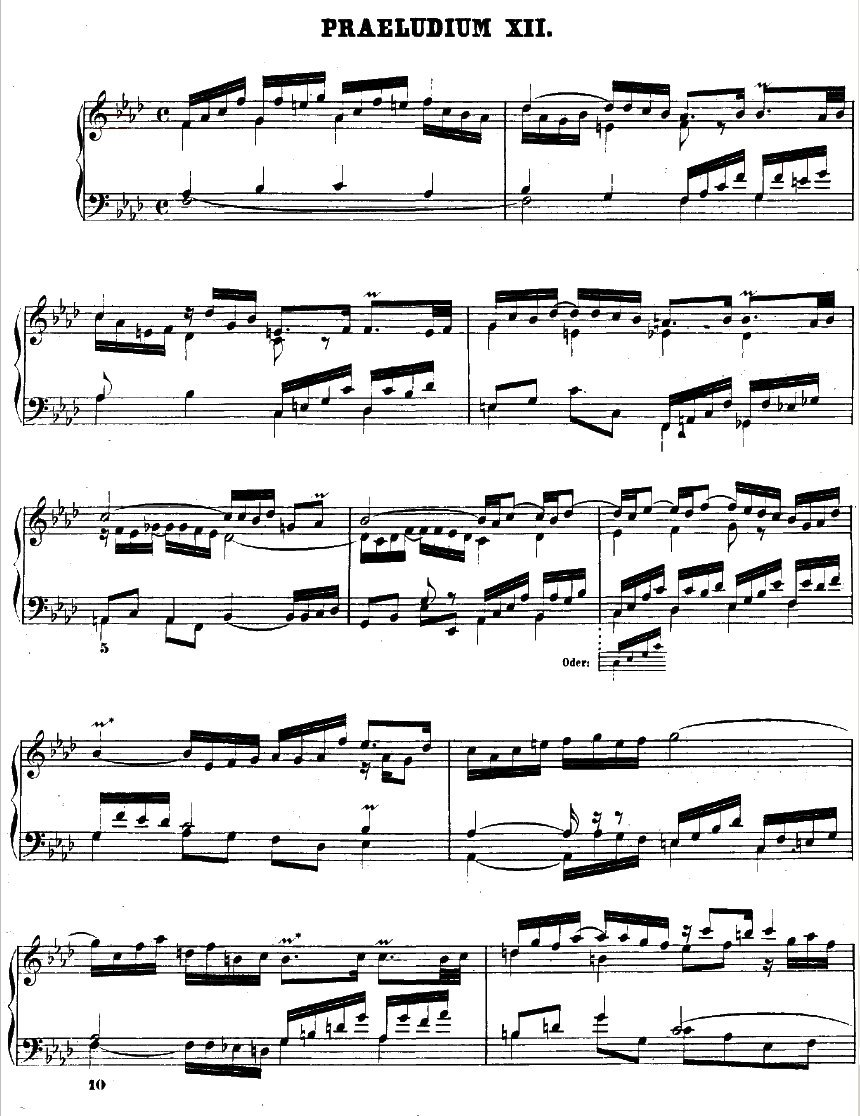
The Prelude in F minor of The Well-Tempered Clavier book 1, in the BGA known as Vol. 14, p. 44, over eighty years before it was given the number 857 in the Bach-Werke-Verzeichnis

In the 2nd half of the 19th century the Bach-Gesellschaft (BG) published all Bach's works in around 50 volumes, the so-called Bach Gesellschaft Ausgabe (BGA). This offered a unique identification of all Bach's known works, a system that was quickly adopted, for instance, by the biographers: Philipp Spitta used it complementarily to the Peters edition's numbering for the BG volumes that had appeared when he was writing his Bach-biography in the second half of the 19th century (e.g. "B. G., III., p. 173" for the above-mentioned Prelude in E♭ major), and Terry used it in the third Appendix to his 20th-century translation of Forkel's biography.

Despite this, there was still much confusion. Some authors preferred to list Bach's works according to Novello's editions, or Augener's, or Schirmer's, giving rise to various conversion tables at the end of books on Bach's compositions (e.g. Harvey Grace's in a 1922 book on Bach's organ compositions).

==== NBG ====
In 1900 the BG published its last volume, and dissolved itself, as its primary goal, publishing all of Bach's known works, was accomplished. The BG was succeeded by the Neue Bachgesellschaft (NBG), with a new set of goals (Bach yearbook, Bach festivals, and a Bach museum). Occasionally, however, the NBG published newly discovered works, or variants not published in the BGA. For instance the 1740s version of O Jesu Christ, meins Lebens Licht was published in NBG XVII^{1} in 1916 (the 1730s version of the same piece, with a different orchestration, had been published in BG 24, pp. 185–192).

=== BWV ===
In 1950 the Bach-Werke-Verzeichnis (lit. 'Bach Works Catalogue'; BWV) was published, allocating a unique number to every known composition by Bach. Wolfgang Schmieder, the editor of that catalogue, grouped the compositions by genre (not chronologically), largely following BG for the collation (e.g., BG cantata number = BWV number of the cantata):

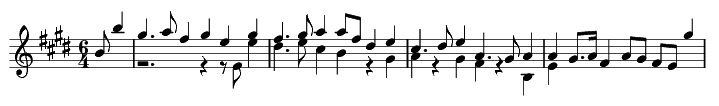
The BWV is a thematic catalogue, thus it identifies every movement of every composition by its first measures, like the opening of BWV 1006, movement 2 (Loure) above.

1. Kantaten (Cantatas), BWV 1–224
2. Motetten (Motets), BWV 225–231
3. Messen, Messensätze, Magnificat (Masses, Mass movements, Magnificat), BWV 232–243
4. Passionen, Oratorien (Passions, Oratorios), BWV 244–249
5. Vierstimmige Choräle (Four-part chorales), BWV 250–438
6. Lieder, Arien, Quodlibet (Songs, Arias and Quodlibet), BWV 439–524
7. Werke für Orgel (Works for organ), BWV 525–771
8. Werke für Klavier (Keyboard compositions), BWV 772–994
9. Werke für Laute (Lute compositions), BWV 995–1000
10. Kammermusik (Chamber music), BWV 1001–1040
11. Orchesterwerke (Works for orchestra), BWV 1041–1071, originally in two separate chapters: Concertos (BWV 1041–1065) and Overtures (BWV 1066–1071)
12. Kanons (Canons), BWV 1072–1078
13. Musikalisches Opfer, Kunst der Fuge (Musical Offering, Art of the Fugue), BWV 1079–1080

For instance, the Prelude and Fugue in E♭ major now became BWV 552, situated in the range of the works for organ.

In contrast to other catalogues, such as the Köchel catalogue for Mozart's compositions, no attempt is made at chronological organization in the BWV numbering; for instance, although BWV 992 has a relatively high number, it happens to be an early composition by Bach.

Although not as common, BWV numbers are sometimes also known as Schmieder (S) numbers, after the original editor; for example, S. 225 is the same as BWV 225.

Another consequence of the ordering principles of the BWV was that it split known collections apart; for instance, Clavier-Übung III was partly in the organ compositions range (BWV 552 and 669–689), with the four duets listed among the keyboard compositions (BWV 802–805).

==== BWV Anh. ====
The Anhang (Anh.), i.e. Appendix, of the BWV listed works that were not suitable for the main catalogue, in three sections:

- I – lost works, or works of which only a tiny fraction had survived (Anh. 1–23)
- II – works of dubious authenticity (Anh. 24–155)
- III – works that were once attributed to Bach, but for which it had been established they were not composed by him (Anh. 156–189)

Within each section of the Anhang the works are sorted by genre, following the same sequence of genres as the main catalogue.

Schmieder published the BWV's second edition in 1990, with some modifications regarding authenticity discriminations, and more works added to the main catalogue and the Anhang. A strict numerical collation was abandoned to insert additions, or when for another reason compositions were regrouped. For example, BWV 11, formerly listed as a Cantata, was moved to the fourth chapter of the main catalogue as an Oratorio. Rather than renumbering a composition, an arrow indicated where the composition was inserted: "BWV 11/249b→" meaning "BWV 11, inserted after BWV 249b" (4th chapter). Similarly, BWV 1083/243a→ meant BWV 1083, inserted after BWV 243a (3rd chapter). Also, authenticity discriminations, based on new research, could lead to such repositionings within the catalogue; for example, "BWV Anh. II 114" became "Anh. II 114/Anh. III 183→, indicating it was now considered a spurious work.

In 1998, Alfred Dürr and Yoshitake Kobayashi published a small edition of the catalogue, based on the 1990 second edition. This edition, known as BWV^{2a}, contained a few further updates and collation rearrangements.

New additions (Nachträge) to BWV^{2}/BWV^{2a} included:

- BWV 1081–1126
- BWV Anh. 190–213

A few exceptions to the principle that compositions were not renumbered were when a composition from the Anhang could be recovered or authenticated as Bach's, so that it deserved a place in the main catalogue, in which case it was given a number above 1080. So, for example, BWV Anh. 205 (BWV^{2}) → BWV 1121 (BWV^{2a}, where it is in section 7 as a work for organ).

Other renumberings and additional numbers involved alternative or earlier versions of basically the same composition, which were indicated by adding a lower case letter to the BWV number. Examples:

- BWV 243a: 1723 E♭ major version of the 1733 Magnificat in D major BWV 243
- BWV 1071 renumbered to BWV 1046a (early version of the first Brandenburg Concerto)
- BWV Anh. 198 renumbered to BWV 149/1a (earlier abandoned version of the opening movement of Cantata BWV 149)

Some versions were completely removed from the catalogue, e.g. BWV 655b and c.

Slashes indicate movements: e.g. BWV 149/1 indicates the first movement of the Cantata BWV 149. Another example: the Agnus Dei of the Mass in B minor can be indicated as BWV 232/22 (22nd movement of the composition), or alternatively as BWV 232^{IV}/4 (BWV 232, fourth movement of Part IV).

==== 21st-century additions ====
Numbers above BWV 1126 were added in the 21st century.

==== Reconstructed versions ====
An upper case R added to a BWV number indicates a reconstructed version, that is a conjectured earlier version of a known composition. One of such reconstructions, the Concerto for oboe and violin, as published in NBA VII/7 (Supplement) p. 75, based on the double harpsichord concerto BWV 1060, is known as BWV 1060R.

==== BWV^{3} ====
As of mid-2018 the Bach digital website started to implement the new numbers of the 3rd edition of the Bach-Werke-Verzeichnis, which has been announced for publication in 2020. For example, the Leipzig version of the Christ lag in Todes Banden cantata used to be BWV 4 in previous versions of the catalogue, and, in BWV^{3}, has become BWV 4.2.

=== NBA ===
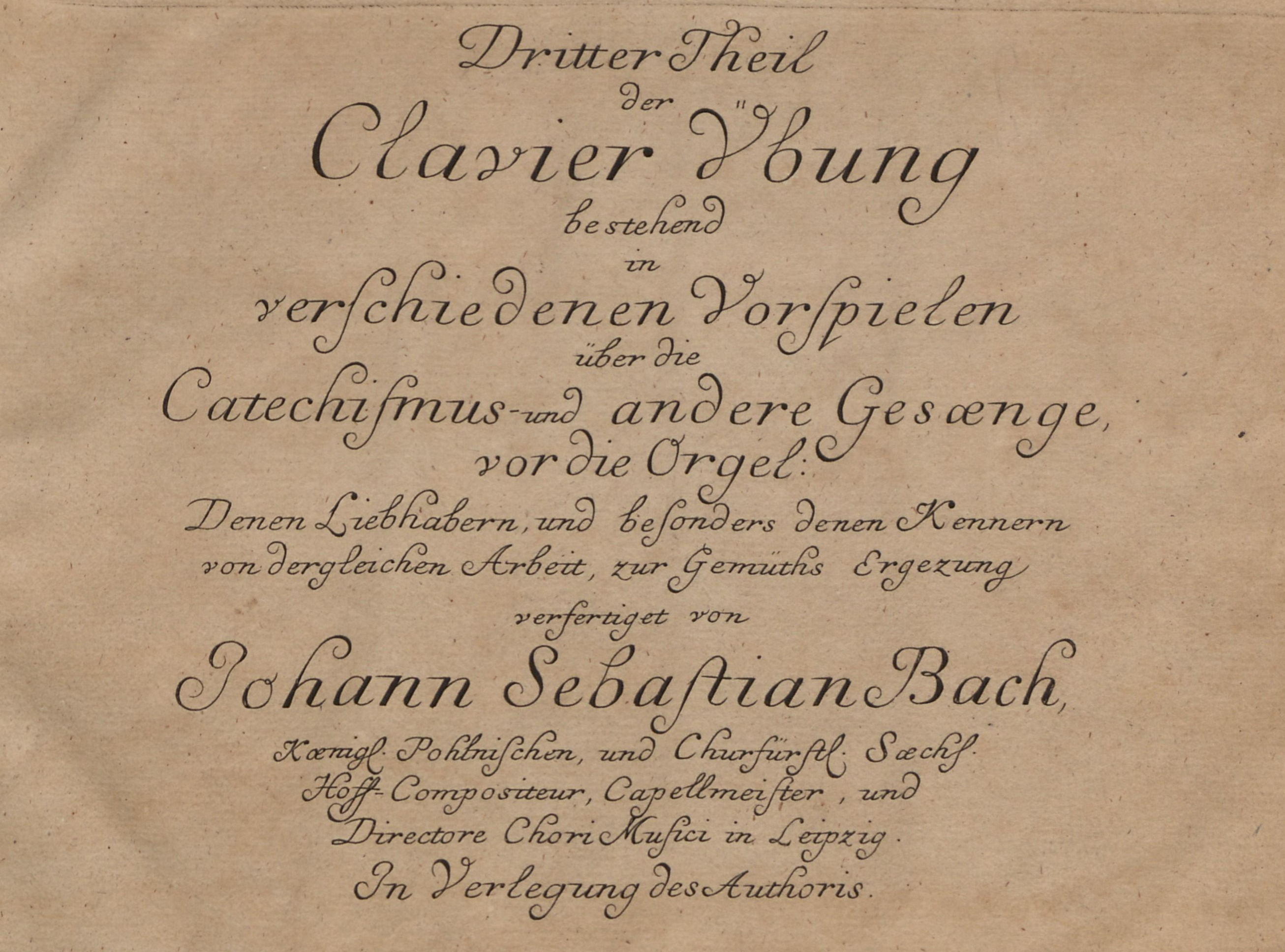
The NBA illustrates its score editions with facsimiles from manuscripts or contemporary editions: for instance NBA Series IV Volume 4 (Clavier-Übung III) contains a facsimile of the title page of the 1739 first edition of that collection.

In the meantime, the New Bach Edition (Neue Bach-Ausgabe, abbreviated as NBA) was being published, offering a new system to refer to Bach's works, e.g. NBA IV/4: 2, 105, which is Series IV, Volume 4, p. 2 (Prelude) and p. 105 (Fugue), for BWV 552.

==== NBArev ====
Some years after the completion of the NBA in 2007 its publisher Bärenreiter joined with the Bach Archive again to publish revised editions of some of Bach's scores. These revised editions, aligning with the NBA editions (format, layout), but outside that group of publications, were published under the name Johann Sebastian Bach: New Edition of the Complete Works – Revised Edition (Johann Sebastian Bach: Neue Ausgabe sämtlicher Werke – Revidierte Edition), in short: New Bach Edition – Revised (Neue Bach-Ausgabe – Revidierte Edition), abbreviated as NBArev. Where the original NBA editions were exclusively in German, the volumes of the Revised series have their introductions both in German and English. Its first volume, NBArev 1, was a new edition of the Mass in B minor, appearing in 2010.

=== BC ===
The Bach Compendium (BC), a catalogue covering Bach's vocal works was published in 1985. Occasionally works that have no BWV number can be identified by their BC number, e.g. BC C 8 for "Der Gerechte kömmt um" an arrangement attributed to Bach on stylistic grounds, but unmentioned in the BWV.

=== BNB ===
Bachs Notenbibliothek (BNB) is a list of works Bach had at his disposition. Works of other composers which were arranged by Bach or which he (had) copied for performance usually have a BNB number.

=== SBB ===
The Berlin State Library (Staatsbibliothek zu Berlin = SBB) holds an important collection of composition manuscripts relating to Bach. Some versions of works are best known by their principal manuscript in the SBB, for instance BWV 525a = SBB St 345, or according to the abbreviations used at the Bach-digital website D-B Mus. ms. Bach St 345.

=== By opus number, and chronological lists ===
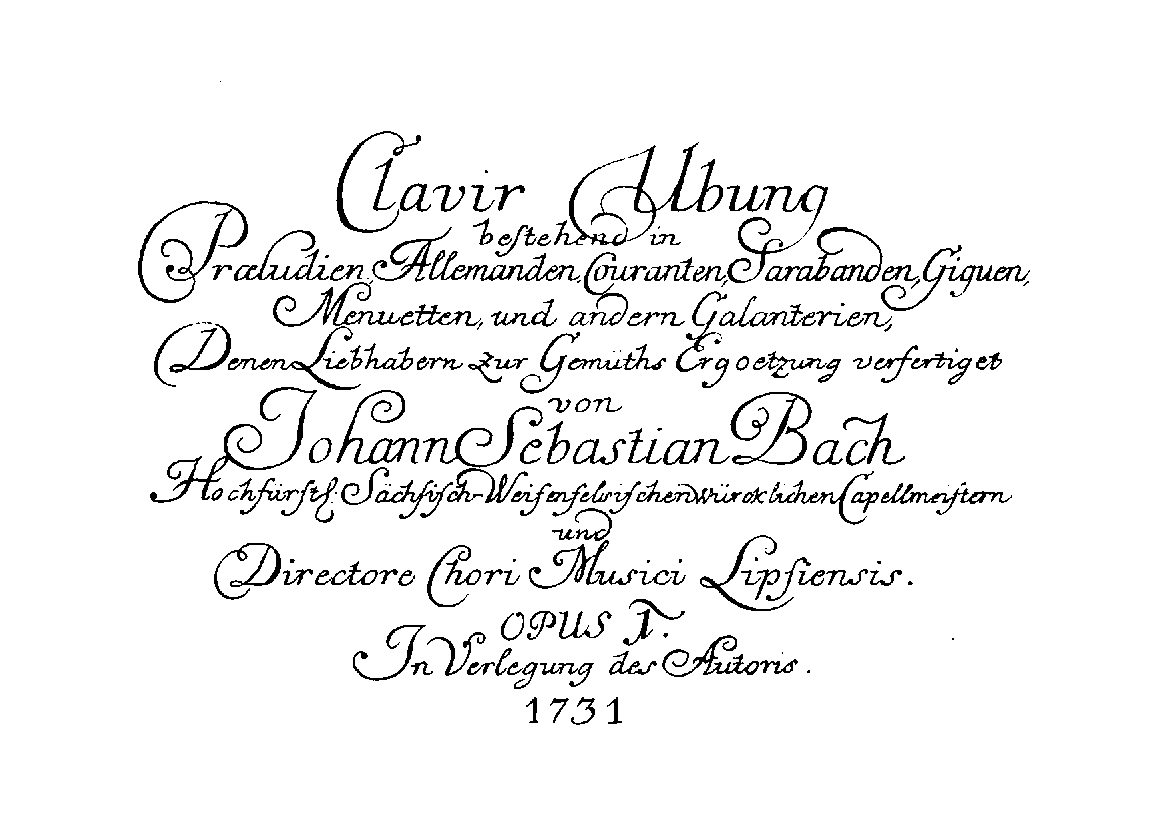
Title page of Bach's Opus 1 (Clavier-Übung I, 1731), the only time he seems to have used an opus number

Apart from indicating his first published keyboard composition as Opus 1, Bach did not use opus numbers. Lists following publication chronologies are for example implied in the first list in Bach's obituary, and BG numbers (within the BGA sequence of publication) – overall lists covering all of Bach's compositions in order of first publication are however not a way Bach's compositions are usually presented.

Listing Bach's works according to their time of composition cannot be done comprehensively: for many works the period in which they were composed is a very wide range. For Bach's larger vocal works (cantatas, Passions,...) research has led to some more or less generally accepted chronologies, covering most of these works: a catalogue in this sense is Philippe (and Gérard) Zwang's list giving a chronological number to the cantatas BWV 1–215 and 248–249. This list was published in 1982 as Guide pratique des cantates de Bach in Paris, ISBN 2-221-00749-2. A revised edition was published in 2005 (ISBN 2747598888).

=== Other composers ===
Various catalogues with works by other composers have intersections with collections of works associated with Bach:

BR-WFB (or) BR
Bach-Repertorium numbers for works by Wilhelm Friedemann Bach, e.g. BWV 970 = BR A49
Other BRs:
- BR-CPEB: works by Carl Philipp Emanuel Bach (for this composer Helm or Wotquenne numbers are however more often used)
- BR-JCFB: works by Johann Christoph Friedrich Bach
Fk (or) F
Falck catalogue numbers for works by Wilhelm Friedemann Bach, e.g. BWV 970 = F 25/2
H
Helm numbers for works by Carl Philipp Emanuel Bach, e.g. BWV 1036 = H 569
HWV
Works by George Frideric Handel, e.g. BWV Anh. 106 = HWV 605
TWV
Compositions by Georg Philipp Telemann, e.g. BWV 824 = TWV 32:14
Warb (or) W
Warburton numbers for works by Johann Christian Bach, e.g. BWV Anh. II 131 = W A22 (or: Warb A 22)
Wq
Wotquenne numbers for works by Carl Philipp Emanuel Bach, e.g. BWV 1036 = Wq 145

== Works in Bach's catalogues and collections ==
There are over 1500 works that feature in a catalogue of works by Bach, like the Bach-Werke-Verzeichnis, or in a collection of works associated with Bach (e.g. in one of the Notebooks for Anna Magdalena Bach). Of these around a thousand are original compositions by Bach, that is: more than a mere copy or transcription of an earlier work by himself or another composer.

Legend to the table
column		content
1	BWV	Bach-Werke-Verzeichnis (lit. 'Bach-works-catalogue'; BWV) numbers. Anhang (Annex; Anh.) numbers are indicated as follows: preceded by I: in Anh. I (lost works) of BWV^{1} (1950 first edition of the BWV); preceded by II: in Anh. II (doubtful works) of BWV^{1}; preceded by III: in Anh. III (spurious works) of BWV^{1}; preceded by N: new Anh. numbers in BWV^{2} (1990) and/or BWV^{2a} (1998)
2	^{2a}	Section in which the composition appears in BWV^{2a}: Chapters of the main catalogue indicated by Arabic numerals (1-13); Anh. sections indicated by Roman numerals (I–III); Reconstructions published in the NBE indicated by "R"
3	Date	Date associated with the completion of the listed version of the composition. Exact dates (e.g. for most cantatas) usually indicate the assumed date of first (public) performance. When the date is followed by an abbreviation in brackets (e.g. JSB for Johann Sebastian Bach) it indicates the date of that person's involvement with the composition as composer, scribe or publisher.
4	Name	Name of the composition: if the composition is known by a German incipit, that German name is preceded by the composition type (e.g. cantata, chorale prelude, motet, ...)
5	Key	Key of the composition
6	Scoring	See scoring table below for the abbreviations used in this column
7	BG	Bach Gesellschaft-Ausgabe (BG edition; BGA): numbers before the colon indicate the volume in that edition. After the colon an Arabic numeral indicates the page number where the score of the composition begins, while a Roman numeral indicates a description of the composition in the Vorwort (Preface) of the volume.
8	NBE	New Bach Edition (German: Neue Bach-Ausgabe, NBA): Roman numerals for the series, followed by a slash, and the volume number in Arabic numerals. A page number, after a colon, refers to the "Score" part of the volume. Without such page number, the composition is only described in the "Critical Commentary" part of the volume. The volumes group Bach's compositions by genre: 1. Cantatas (Vol. 1–34: church cantatas grouped by occasion; Vol. 35–40: secular cantatas; Vol. 41: Varia); 2. Masses, Passions, Oratorios (12 volumes); 3. Motets, Chorales, Lieder (4 volumes); 4. Organ Works (11 volumes); 5. Keyboard and Lute Works (14 volumes); 6. Chamber Music (5 volumes); 7. Orchestral Works (7 volumes); 8. Canons, Musical Offering, Art of Fugue (3 volumes); 9. Addenda (approximately 7 volumes)
9	Additional info	may include: "after" – indicating a model for the composition; "by" – indicating the composer of the composition (if different from Johann Sebastian Bach); "in" – indicating the oldest known source for the composition; "pasticcio" – indicating a composition with parts of different origin; "see" – composition renumbered in a later edition of the BWV; "text" – by text author, or, in source; Provenance of standard texts and tunes, such as Lutheran hymns and their chorale melodies, Latin liturgical texts (e.g. Magnificat) and common tunes (e.g. Folia), are not usually indicated in this column. For an overview of such resources used by Bach, see individual composition articles, and overviews in, e.g., Chorale cantata (Bach)#Bach's chorale cantatas, List of chorale harmonisations by Johann Sebastian Bach#Chorale harmonisations in various collections and List of organ compositions by Johann Sebastian Bach#Chorale Preludes.
10	BD	Bach Digital Work page

Background colours
Colour	Meaning
green	extant or clearly documented partial or complete manuscript (copy) by Bach and/or first edition under Bach's supervision
yellow	extant or clearly documented manuscript (copy) or print edition, in whole or in part, by close relative, i.e. brother (J. Christoph), wife (A. M.), son (W. F. / C. P. E. / J. C. F. / J. Christian) or son-in-law (Altnickol)
orange-brown	extant or clearly documented manuscript (copy) by close friend and/or pupil (Kellner, Krebs, Kirnberger, Walther, ...), or distant family member

Table sections (collated as in BWV^{2a} for BWV 1–1126 and Anhang)
BWV (original ranges in parentheses)
1. Cantatas (1–224) • 2. Motets (225–231) • 3. Masses, Mass movements, Magnificat (232–243) • 4. Passions, Oratorios (244–249) • 5. Four-part chorales (250–438) • 6. Songs, Arias and Quodlibet (439–524) • 7. Works for organ (525–771) • 8. Keyboard compositions (772–994) • 9. Lute compositions (995–1000) • 10. Chamber music (1001–1040) • 11. Works for orchestra (1041–1071) • 12. Canons (1072–1078) • 13. Musical Offering, The Art of Fugue (1079–1080) • Later additions (1081–...) • Reconstructions
BWV Anhang (Appendix)
I: Lost/fragmentary (1–23) • II: Doubtful (24–155) • III: Spurious (156–189) • N: Nachträge (New additions, 190–213)
Not in BWV (BWV deest)
Sorted by BC, BGA, BNB, NBA, etc.

Collections
Without resorting the table (i.e. collection kept together in BWV^{2a})
Cello Suites BWV 1007–1012 • Christmas Oratorio, BWV 248 • Clavier-Übung IV = Goldberg Variations BWV 988 • Inventions BWV 772–786 • Sinfonias BWV 787–801 • Sonatas and partitas for solo violin BWV 1001–1006
Using the sort function (not available in all browsers)
- Cantatas by function (Advent I → Trinity XXVII; other Feasts, celebrations and church services; Secular cantatas): sort by NBA → **I/1**
- Clavier-Übung I (1731): sort by NBA → **V/1**
- Clavier-Übung II (1735): sort by NBA → **V/2**
- Clavier-Übung III (1739): sort by NBA → **IV/4**
- Kirnberger collection of chorale preludes: sort by BWV → **BWV 690**
- Klavierbüchlein für Wilhelm Friedemann Bach (1720): sort by NBA → **V/5**
- Twelve Little Preludes: sort by BG → **36: 118**
- Neumeister Chorales by J. S. Bach (without BWV 601, 639, 719, 723, 737 and 751): sort by NBA → **IV/9**
- Notebook for Anna Magdalena Bach (1722): sort by Name → **Notebook A. M. Bach (1722)**
- Notebook for Anna Magdalena Bach (1725): sort by Name → **Notebook A. M. Bach (1725)**
- Vivaldi arrangements: sort by Additional info → **after Vivaldi**
- The Well-Tempered Clavier book I (1722): sort by BG → **Vol. 14**
- The Well-Tempered Clavier book II (1739–1742): sort by NBA → **V/6.2**
- The Well-Tempered Clavier book II (1744): sort by BG → **14: 91**

Works in Bach's catalogues and collections
BWV	^{2a}	Date	Name	Key	Scoring	BG	NBE	Additional info	BD
**1.**	Cantatas (see also: List of Bach cantatas, Church cantata (Bach) and List of secular cantatas by Johann Sebastian Bach)								Up ↑
1	1.	1725-03-25	Cantata Wie schön leuchtet der Morgenstern (Annunciation)	F maj.	stbSATB 2Hn 2Odc 2**Vl** Str Bc	1: 1	I/28.2: 3	after Z 8359; text after Nicolai	00001
2	1.	1724-06-18	Cantata Ach Gott, vom Himmel sieh darein (Trinity II)	G min.	atbSATB 4Tbn 2Ob Str Bc	1: 53	I/16: 81	after Z 4431; text after Luther	00002
2/6	1.	1724-06-18	chorale setting "Ach Gott, vom Himmel sieh darein" (s. 6)	G Dor.	SATB	1: 72	III/2.1: 25; III/2.2: 156	after Z 4431; text by Luther	11189
3	1.	1725-01-14	Cantata Ach Gott, wie manches Herzeleid (Epiphany II)	A maj.	satbSATB Hn Tbn 2Oba Str Bc	1: 73	I/5: 189	after Z 533a; text after Moller	00003
3/6	1.	1725-01-14	chorale setting "Ach Gott, wie manches Herzeleid" (s. 18)	A maj.	SATB	1: 94	III/2.1: 26; III/2.2: 90	after Z 533a; text by Moller	11191
4.2	1.	1724-04-09	Cantata Christ lag in Todes Banden (Easter)	E min.	satbSATB Cnt 3Tbn Str Bc	1: 95	I/9: 1	after BWV 4.1; text by Luther	00004
4/8	1.	1724-04-09	chorale setting "Christ lag in Todes Banden" (s. 7)	E min. D min.	SATB	1: 124	III/2.2: 104	after Z 7012a; text by Luther	11295
4.1	1.	1707-04-24	Cantata Christ lag in Todes Banden (Easter; early version, lost)		satbSATB 2Vl 2Va Bc		I/9	after Z 7012a; → BWV 4.2; text by Luther	00005
5	1.	1724-10-15	Cantata Wo soll ich fliehen hin (Trinity XIX)	G min.	satbSATB Tdt 2Ob Str Bc	1: 125	I/24: 133	after Z 2164; text after Heermann	00006
5/7	1.	1724-10-15	chorale setting "Wo soll ich fliehen hin" (s. 11)	G min.	SATB	1: 150	III/2.1: 66; III/2.2: 180	after Z 2164; text by Heermann	11232
5/7	1.	1724-10-15	chorale setting "Auf meinen lieben Gott"	G min.	SATB	1: 150	III/2.1: 66; III/2.2: 180	after Z 2164	11232
6	1.	1725-04-02	Cantata Bleib bei uns, denn es will Abend werden (Easter 2)	C min.	satbSATB 2Ob Odc Str Vc Bc	1: 151	I/10: 43	after Z 439 (/3: → BWV 649), Z 350a (/6); text after Lk 24:29 (/1), by Melanchthon & Selnecker (/3), Luther (/6)	00007
6/6	1.	1725-04-02	chorale setting "Erhalt uns, Herr, bei deinem Wort" (s. 2)	G min.	SATB	1: 176	III/2.2: 40	after Z 350a; text by Luther	11338
7	1.	1724-06-24	Cantata Christ unser Herr zum Jordan kam (24 June: feast of John the Baptist)	E min.	atbSATB 2Oba 2**Vl** Str Bc	1: 177	I/29: 25	after Z 7246; text after Luther	00008
8.1	1.	1724-09-24	Cantata Liebster Gott, wenn werd ich sterben? (Trinity XVI; 1st version)	E maj.	satbSATB Hn Fl 2Oba Str Bc	1: 211	I/23: 105	after Z 6634; by Vetter, D. (/6); text after Neumann; → BWV 8.2	00009
8.2	1.	1747-09-17	Cantata Liebster Gott, wenn werd ich sterben? (Trinity XVI; 2nd version)	D maj.	satbSATB Fl 2Oba Tai 2**Vl** Str Bc		I/23: 163	after BWV 8.1	00010
9	1.	1734-08-01	Cantata Es ist das Heil uns kommen her (Trinity VI)	E maj.	satbSATB Fl Oba Str Bc	1: 243	I/17.2: 83	after Z 4430; text after Speratus	00011
9/7	1.	1734-08-01	chorale setting "Es ist das Heil uns kommen her" (s. 12)	E maj.	SATB	1: 274	III/2.1: 52; III/2.2: 172	after Z 4430; text by Speratus	11213
10	1.	1724-07-02	Cantata Meine Seel erhebt den Herren a.k.a. German Magnificat (Visitation)	G min.	satbSATB Tr 2Ob Str Bc	1: 275	I/28.2: 131	after Magnificat peregrini toni; text after Magnificat; → BWV 648	00012
10/7	1.	1724-07-02	chorale setting "Meine Seel erhebt den Herren" (doxology, ss. 10–11)	G min.	SATB	1: 303	III/2.1: 82; III/2.2: 205	after Magnificat peregrini toni; text: German Magnificat	11248
12	1.	1714-04-22	Cantata Weinen, Klagen, Sorgen, Zagen (Jubilate; two versions)	F Dor.	atbSATB Tr Ob 2Vl 2Va Bas Bc	2: 59	I/11.2: 1	after Z 5629 (/7: → BWV 69.1/6); text by Franck, S.?; text after Acts 14:22 (/3); text by Rodigast (/7); /2 → BWV 232/14	00014
12	1.	1724-04-30	Cantata Weinen, Klagen, Sorgen, Zagen (Jubilate; two versions)	G min.	atbSATB Tr Ob 2Vl 2Va Bas Bc		I/11.2: 1	after Z 5629 (/7: → BWV 69.1/6); text by Franck, S.?; text after Acts 14:22 (/3); text by Rodigast (/7); /2 → BWV 232/14	00014
13	1.	1726-01-20	Cantata Meine Seufzer, meine Tränen (Epiphany II)	D min.	satbSATB 2Fl Odc Str Bc	2: 79	I/5: 229	after Z 6543 (/3), Z 2293b (/6); text by Lehms, Heermann (/3), Fleming (/6)	00015
13/6	1.	1726-01-20	chorale setting "In allen meinen Taten" (s. 9)	B♭ maj.	SATB	2: 98	III/2.2: 58	after Z 2293b; text by Fleming	11347
13/6	1.	1726-01-20	chorale setting "Nun ruhen alle Wälder"	G maj.	SATB		III/2.2: 216	after Z 2293b; text by Fleming	11347
14	1.	1735-01-30	Cantata Wär Gott nicht mit uns diese Zeit (Epiphany IV)	G min.	stbSATB Hn 2Ob Str Bc	2: 99	I/6: 139	after Z 4434; text after Luther	00016
14/5	1.	1735-01-30	chorale setting "Wär Gott nicht mit uns diese Zeit" (s. 3)	G min.	SATB	2: 132	III/2.1: 88; III/2.2: 103	after Z 4434; text by Luther	11250
16	1.	1726-01-01	Cantata Herr Gott, dich loben wir (New Year/Circumcision)	A min.	atbSATB Hn 2Ob Odc Str Bc	2: 173	I/4: 103	after Z 8652 (/1), 5267 (/6; → BWV 419); text by Lehms, Luther (/1), Eber (/6)	00018
16	1.	1731-01-01	Cantata Herr Gott, dich loben wir (New Year/Circumcision)	A min.	atbSATB Hn 2Ob Va Str Bc	2: 173	I/4: 103	after Z 8652 (/1), 5267 (/6; → BWV 419); text by Lehms, Luther (/1), Eber (/6)	00018
16/6	1.	1726-01-01	chorale setting "Helft mir Gotts Güte preisen" (s. 6)	A min.	SATB	2: 198	III/2.2: 56	after Z 5267; text by Eber	11324
17	1.	1726-09-22	Cantata Wer Dank opfert, der preiset mich (Trinity XIV)	A maj.	satbSATB 2Ob Str Bc	2: 199	I/21: 147	after Z 8244 (/7); text: Meiningen, after Ps 50:23 (/1; → BWV 236/6), Lk 17:15–16 (/4), by Gramann (/7)	00019
17/7	1.	1726-09-22	chorale setting "Nun lob, mein Seel, den Herren" (s. 3)	A maj.	SATB	2: 225	III/2.2: 4	after Z 8244; text by Gramann	11330
18.2	1.	1724-02-13	Cantata Gleichwie der Regen und Schnee vom Himmel fällt (Sexagesima)	A min.	stbSATB 2Fl Bas 4Va Vc Bc	2: 227 (in g)	I/7: 107	after BWV 18.1; text by Neumeister, after Is 55:10–11 (/2), Luther (/3), by Spengler (/5)	00020
18/5	1.	1724-02-13	chorale setting "Durch Adams Fall ist ganz verderbt" (s. 8)	A min.	SATB	2: 252 (in g)	III/2.2: 71	after Z 7549; text by Spengler	11301
18/5	1.	1715-02-24	chorale setting "Ich ruf zu dir, Herr Jesu Christ"	G min.	SATB	2: 252 (in g)	III/2.2: 56	after Z 7549; text by Agricola	11301
18.1	1.	1715-02-24	Cantata Gleichwie der Regen und Schnee vom Himmel fällt (Sexagesima)	G min.	stbSATB Bas 4Va Vc Bc		I/7: 81	after Z 7549 (/5); text by Neumeister, after Is 55:10–11 (/2), Luther (/3), by Spengler (/5); → BWV 18.2	00021
19	1.	1726-09-29	Cantata Es erhub sich ein Streit (Michaelmas)	C maj.	stbSATB 3Tr Tmp 2Ob 2Oba Tai Str Bc	2: 253	I/30: 55	after Z 6543 (/7); text after Picander	00022
19/7	1.	1726-09-29	chorale setting "Freu dich sehr, o meine Seele" (s. 9)	C maj.	SATB	2: 288	III/2.1: 62; III/2.2: 177	after Z 6543	11227
19/7	1.	1726-09-29	chorale setting "Weg, mein Herz, mit den Gedanken"	C maj.	SATB	2: 288	III/2.1: 62; III/2.2: 177	after Z 6543; text by Gerhardt	11227
20	1.	1724-06-11	Cantata O Ewigkeit, du Donnerwort (Trinity I)	F maj.	atbSATB Tdt Tmp 3Ob Str Bc	2: 291	I/15: 133	after Z 5820; text after Rist	00023
20/7; 20/11	1.	1724-06-11	chorale setting "O Ewigkeit, du Donnerwort" (ss. 11, 16)	F maj.	SATB	2: 317, 327	III/2.2: 17	after Z 5820; text by Rist	11332
21.1	1.	before Dec. 1713	Cantata Ich hatte viel Bekümmernis (1st version: in ogni tempore; 1714-06-17: Trinity III)	C min.	satbSATB 3Tr Tmp Ob Str Bc		I/16: 109	after Z 2778 (/9); text by Franck, S.?; text after Ps 94:19 (/2), 42:12 (/6), 116:7 (/9), Rv 5:12–13 (/11), by Neumark (/9); → BWV 21.2	00024
21.2	1.	c. autumn 1720	Cantata Ich hatte viel Bekümmernis (2nd version: in ogni tempore)	D min.	satbSATB 3Tr Tmp Ob Str Bas Bc		I/16	after BWV 21.1 (same text); → BWV 21.3	00025
21.3	1.	1723-06-13	Cantata Ich hatte viel Bekümmernis (3rd version: Trinity III)	C min.	satbSATB 3Tr Tmp 4Tne Ob Str Bas Bc	5^{1}: 1	I/16	after BWV 21.2 (same text)	00026
22	1.	1723-02-07	Cantata Jesus nahm zu sich die Zwölfe (Estomihi)		satbSATB Ob Str Bc	5^{1}: 65	I/8: 1	after Z 4297a (/5); text after Luke 18:31, 34 (/1), by Cruciger (/5)	00027
23.1	1.	1723	Cantata Du wahrer Gott und Davids Sohn (1st version, 3 movements: Estomihi)	C min.	satbSATB 2Ob Str Bc	5^{1}: 93	I/8: 33	→ BWV 23.2, .3	00028
23.2	1.	1723-02-07	Cantata Du wahrer Gott und Davids Sohn (2nd version, 4 movements: Estomihi)	B min.	satbSATB Cnt 3Tbn 2Oba Str Bc		I/8: 69	after BWV 23.1, Z 58 (/4); text by Luther after Agnus Dei (/4); → BWV 23.3, 245.2/40	00029
23.3	1.	1728–1731	Cantata Du wahrer Gott und Davids Sohn (3rd version, 4 movements: Estomihi)	C min.	satbSATB 2Ob Str Bc	5^{1}: 93	I/8: 33	after BWV 23.1, .2; text by Luther after Agnus Dei (/4)	00030
24	1.	1723-06-20	Cantata Ein ungefärbt Gemüte (Trinity IV)	F maj.	satbSATB Tr 2Ob 2Oba Str Bc	5^{1}: 125	I/17.1: 47	after Z 5148 (/6); text by Neumeister, Heermann (/6), after Mt 7:12 (/3)	00031
24/6	1.	1723-06-20	chorale setting "O Gott, du frommer Gott" (s. 1)	F maj.	SATB	5^{1}: 150	III/2.2: 195	after Z 5148; text by Heermann	11333
24/6	1.	1723-06-20	chorale setting "Was frag ich nach der Welt"	F maj.	SATB	5^{1}: 150	III/2.2: 195	after Z 5148; text by Kindermann	11333
25	1.	1723-08-29	Cantata Es ist nichts Gesundes an meinem Leibe (Trinity XIV)	E min.	stbSATB Cnt 3Tbn 3Fl 2Ob Str Bc	5^{1}: 153	I/21: 79	after Z 6543 (/6); text after Rambach, Ps 38:4 (/1), by Heermann (/6)	00032
25/6	1.	1723-08-29	chorale setting "Treuer Gott, ich muss dir klagen" (s. 12)	C maj.	SATB	5^{1}: 188	III/2.1: 15; III/2.2: 150	after Z 6543; text by Heermann	11177
25/6	1.	1723-08-29	chorale setting "Weg, mein Herz, mit den Gedenken"	C maj.	SATB	5^{1}: 188	III/2.1: 15; III/2.2: 150	after Z 6543; text by Gerhardt	11177
25/6	1.	1723-08-29	chorale setting "Freu dich sehr, o meine Seele"	C maj.	SATB	5^{1}: 188	III/2.2: 168	after Z 6543	11177
26	1.	1724-11-19	Cantata Ach wie flüchtig, ach wie nichtig (Trinity XXIV)	A min.	satbSATB Hn Fl 3Ob Str Bc	5^{1}: 189	I/27: 29	after Z 1887b; text after Franck, M.	00033
26/6	1.	1724-11-19	chorale setting "Ach wie flüchtig, ach wie nichtig" (s. 8)	A min.	SATB	5^{1}: 216	III/2.2: 28	after Z 1887b; text by Franck, M.	11289
27	1.	1726-10-06	Cantata Wer weiß, wie nahe mir mein Ende? (Trinity XVI)	C min.	satbSSATB Hn 2Ob Odc Str Org Bc	5^{1}: 217	I/23: 221	after Z 2778 (/1); by Rosenmüller (/6 = BWV Anh. 170); text by E. J. of Schwarzburg-Rudolstadt (/1), Albinus (/6), after Neumeister (/3)	00034
28	1.	1725-12-30	Cantata Gottlob! nun geht das Jahr zu Ende (Christmas I)	A min.	satbSATB Cnt 3Tbn 2Ob Tai Str Bc	5^{1}: 245	I/3.2: 75	after Z 8244 (/2), 5267 (/6); text by Neumeister, Gramann (/2), Eber (/6), after Jer 32:41 (/3); → BWV 28/2a, Anh. 160/2	00035
28/6	1.	1725-12-30	chorale setting "Helft mir Gotts Güte preisen" (s. 12)	A min.	SATB	5^{1}: 272	III/2.1: 13; III/2.2: 49	after Z 5267; text by Eber	11175
28/6	1.	1725-12-30	chorale setting "Zeuch ein zu deinen Toren"	A min.	SATB	5^{1}: 272	III/2.2: 15	after Z 5267; text by Gerhardt	11175
28/2a	1.	1725?	Motet Sei Lob und Preis mit Ehren	C maj.	SATB	39: 167	III/3: 15	after BWV 28/2; ↔ Anh. 160/2; was BWV 231	00036
29	1.	1731-08-27	Cantata Wir danken dir, Gott, wir danken dir (council election)	D maj.	satbSATB 3Tr Tmp 2Ob Str Org Bc	5^{1}: 273	I/32.2: 1	after BWV 120.2/4 (/1), Z 8244 (/8); text after Ps 75:2 (/2; → BWV 232/7, /23), by Gramann (/8)	00037
29/8	1.	1731-08-27	chorale setting "Nun lob, mein Seel, den Herren" (s. 5)	D maj.	SATB	5^{1}: 316	III/2.2: 65	after Z 8244; text by Gramann	11331
30.2	1.	1738-06-24	Cantata Freue dich, erlöste Schar (24 June: feast of John the Baptist)	D maj.	satbSATB 2Fl 2Ob Oba **Vl** Str Bc	5^{1}: 321	I/29: 59	after BWV 30.1, Z 6543 (/6); text by Picander?, Olearius, J. (/6)	00038
30.2/6	1.	1738-06-24	chorale setting "Tröstet, tröstet, meine Lieben" (s. 3)	A maj.	SATB	5^{1}: 360	III/2.2: 42	after Z 6543; text by Olearius, J.	11318
30.2/6	1.	1738-06-24	chorale setting "Freu dich sehr, o meine Seele"	G maj.	SATB	5^{1}: 360	III/2.2: 42	after Z 6543	11318
30.1	1.	1737-09-28	Secular cantata Angenehmes Wiederau (for Hennicke at Wiederau manor)	D maj.	satbSATB 3Tr Tmp 2Fl 2Ob Oba Str Bc	5^{1}: 399; 34: 325	I/39: 51	text by Picander; → BWV 30.2, 195.2/6, /8	00039
31.2	1.	1724-04-09	Cantata Der Himmel lacht! Die Erde jubilieret (Leipzig version: Easter)	C maj.	stbSSATB 3Tr Tmp Ob 2Oba Bas 2Vl 2Va Bc	7: 1	I/9: 41	after BWV 31.1 (same text)	00040
31/9	1.	1724-04-09	chorale setting "Wenn mein Stündlein vorhanden ist" (s. 5)	C maj.	SATB	7: 50	III/2.1: 56	after Z 4482a; text by Herman	11221
31.1	1.	1715-04-21	Cantata Der Himmel lacht! Die Erde jubilieret (Weimar version: Easter)	C maj.	stbSSATB 3Tr Tmp 3Ob Tai Bas 2Vl 2Va Bc		I/9 rev 2: 37	after Z 4482a (/9); text by Franck, S, Herman (/9); → BWV 31.2	00041
32	1.	1726-01-13	Cantata Liebster Jesu, mein Verlangen (Epiphany I)	E min.	sbSATB Ob Str Bc	7: 53	I/5: 143	after Z 6543 (/6); text by Lehms, Gerhardt (/6)	00042
32/6	1.	1726-01-13	chorale setting "Weg, mein Herz, mit den Gedenken" (s. 12)	G maj.	SATB	7: 80	III/2.2: 18	after Z 6543; text by Gerhardt	11317
32/6	1.	1726-01-13	chorale setting "Freu dich sehr, o meine Seele"	G maj.	SATB	7: 80	III/2.2: 18	after Z 6543	11317
33	1.	1724-09-03	Cantata Allein zu dir, Herr Jesu Christ (Trinity XIII)	A min.	atbSATB 2Ob Str Bc	7: 81	I/21: 23	after Z 7292b; text after Hubert	00043
33/6	1.	1724-09-03	chorale setting "Allein zu dir, Herr Jesu Christ" (s. 4)	A min.	SATB	7: 114	III/2.1: 58; III/2.2: 10	after Z 7292b; text by Hubert	11223
34.1	1.	1727-06-01	Cantata O ewiges Feuer, o Ursprung der Liebe (Pentecost)	D maj.	atbSATB 3Tr Tmp 2Fl 2Ob Str Bc	7: 115	I/13: 129	text after Ps 128:6 (/5); → BWV 34.2	00044
34.2	1.	after 1727	Cantata O ewiges Feuer, o Ursprung der Liebe (wedding; incomplete)	D maj.	satbSATB Vl Va Bc	41: 117	I/33: 27	after BWV 34.1; text after Ps 128:4–6 (/3–/4), Nm 6:24–26 (/7)	00045
35	1.	1726-09-08	Cantata Geist und Seele wird verwirret (Trinity XII)	D min.	a 2Ob Tai Str Org Bc	7: 171	I/20: 215	text by Lehms; → BWV 1059	00046
36.4	1.	c. 1726–1730	Cantata Schwingt freudig euch empor (Advent I; early version)	D maj.	stbSATB Oba Str Bc	7: 395	I/1: 17	after BWV 36.1, Z 8359 (/5); text by Picander?, by Nicolai (/5); → BWV 36.5	00048
36.4/5	1.	c. 1726–1730	chorale setting "Wie schön leuchtet der Morgenstern" (s. 7)	D maj.	SATB	7: 399	III/2.1: 28	after Z 8359; text by Nicolai	11193
36.5	1.	1731-12-02	Cantata Schwingt freudig euch empor (Advent I)	D maj.	satbSATB 2Oba Str Bc	7: 221	I/1: 41	after BWV 36.4, Z 1174 (/2, /6, /8), Z 8359 (/4); text by Picander?, by Luther (/2, /6, /8), Nicolai (/4)	00047
36.5/4	1.	1731-12-02	chorale setting "Wie schön leuchtet der Morgenstern" (s. 6)	D maj.	SATB	7: 243	III/2.2: 48, 109, 180	after Z 8359; text by Nicolai	11346
36.5/8	1.	1731-12-02	chorale setting "Nun komm, der Heiden Heiland" (s. 8)	B min.	SATB	7: 258	III/2.2: 18	after Z 1174; text by Luther	11329
36.2	1.	1726-11-30 or 1725-11-30	Secular cantata Steigt freudig in die Luft (birthday of Charlotte Friederike Wilhelmine of Anhalt-Köthen; music lost)		stbSATB Oba Va Str Bc (?)		I/35	text by Picander; after BWV 36.1/1, /3, /5, /7, /9	00049
36.3	1.	1735-07-27	Secular cantata Die Freude reget sich (birthday of Rivinius, J. F.?)	D maj.	satSATB Fl Oba Str Bc	34: 39	I/38: 255	after BWV 36.1/1, /3, /5, /7, /8	00050
36.1	1.	April–May 1725	Secular cantata Schwingt freudig euch empor (birthday of Mencke, J. B.?)	D maj.	stbSATB Oba Str Va Bc	34: 39	I/39: 1	→ BWV 36.2–.4	00051
37	1.	1724-05-18	Cantata Wer da gläubet und getauft wird (Ascension)	A maj.	satbSATB 2Oba Str Bc	7: 259	I/12: 79	after Z 8359 (/3), 5354 (/6); text after Mk 16: 16, by Nicolai (/3), Kolross (/6)	00052
37/6	1.	1724-05-18	chorale setting "Ich dank dir, lieber Herre" (s. 4)	A maj.	SATB	7: 282	III/2.2: 197	after Z 5354; text by Kolross	11304
38	1.	1724-10-29	Cantata Aus tiefer Not schrei ich zu dir (Trinity XXI)	E min.	satbSATB 2Ob 4Tbn Str Bc	7: 283	I/25: 217	after Z 4437; text after Luther	00053
38/6	1.	1724-10-29	chorale setting "Aus tiefer Not schrei ich zu dir" (s. 5)	E min.	SATB	7: 300	III/2.1: 67; III/2.2: 8	after Z 4437; text by Luther	11233
39	1.	1726-06-23	Cantata Brich dem Hungrigen dein Brot (Trinity I)	G min.	sabSATB 2Fl 2Ob Str Bc	7: 336	I/15 179	after Z 6543 (/7); text: Meiningen, after Is 58:7–8 (/1), Hb 13:16 (/4), by Denicke (/7)	00054
39/7	1.	1726-06-23	chorale setting "Kommt, lasst euch den Herren lehren" (s. 6)	B♭ maj.	SATB	7: 348	III/2.1: 81; III/2.2: 37	after Z 6543; text by Denicke	11247
39/7	1.	1726-06-23	chorale setting "Freu dich sehr, o meine Seele"	B♭ maj.	SATB	7: 348	III/2.1: 81; III/2.2: 37	after Z 6543	11247
40	1.	1723-12-26	Cantata Darzu ist erschienen der Sohn Gottes (Christmas 2)	F maj.	atbSATB 2Hn 2Ob Str Bc	7: 349	I/3.1: 3	after Z 2072 (/3), 4870 (/6), 7880a (/8); text after 1Jh 3:8 (/1; → BWV 233/6), by Füger (/3), Gerhardt (/6), Keymann (/8)	00055
40/3	1.	1723-12-26	chorale setting "Wir Christenleut" (s. 3)	G min.	SATB	7: 377	III/2.2: 186	after Z 2072; text by Füger	11315
40/6	1.	1723-12-26	chorale setting "Schwing dich auf zu deinem Gott" (s. 2)	D min.	SATB	7: 387	III/2.2: 82	after Z 4870; text by Gerhardt	11343
40/8	1.	1723-12-26	chorale setting "Freuet euch, ihr Christen alle" (s. 4)	F min.	SATB	7: 394	III/2.2: 6	after Z 7880a; text by Keymann	11339
41	1.	1725-01-01	Cantata Jesu, nun sei gepreiset (New Year)	C maj.	satbSATB 3Tr Tmp 3Ob Str Vc Bc	10: 1	I/4: 37	after Z 8477a; text after Hermann; /6 → BWV 171/6	00056
41/6	1.	1725-01-01	chorale setting "Jesu, nun sei gepreiset" (s. 3)	C maj.	SATB	10: 58	III/2.1: 90; III/2.2: 8	after Z 8477a; text by Hermann	11253
42	1.	1725-04-08	Cantata Am Abend aber desselbigen Sabbats (Quasimodogeniti)	D maj.	satbSATB 2Ob Bas Str Bc	10: 63	I/11.1: 61	after Z 1945b (/7); text after Jh 20:19 (/2), by Fabricius (/4), Luther after Da pacem Domine & Walter after 1Tm 2:2 (/7)	00057
42/7	1.	1725-04-08	chorale setting "Verleih uns Frieden gnädiglich" (ss. 1–2)	F♯ min.	SATB	10: 91	III/2.1: 21; III/2.2: 51, 154	after Z 1945b; text by Luther after Da pacem Domine & Walter after 1Tm 2:2	11186
43	1.	1726-05-30	Cantata Gott fähret auf mit Jauchzen (Ascension)	C maj.	satbSATB 3Tr Tmp 2Ob Str Bc	10: 93	I/12: 133	after Z 5741b (/11: by Peter); text: Meiningen, after Ps 47:6–7 (/1), Mk 16:19 (/4), by Rist (/11)	00058
44	1.	1724-05-21	Cantata Sie werden euch in den Bann tun (Exaudi)	G min.	satbSATB 2Ob Str Bc	10: 127	I/12: 165	after Z 533a (/4), 2293b (/7); text after Jh 16:2 (/1–2), by Moller (/4), Fleming (/7)	00059
44/7	1.	1724-05-21	chorale setting "In allen meinen Taten" (s. 7)	B♭ maj.	SATB	10: 150	III/2.1: 75; III/2.2: 203	after Z 2293b; text by Fleming	11242
44/7	1.	1724-05-21	chorale setting "Nun ruhen alle Wälder"	B♭ maj.	SATB	10: 150	III/2.1: 75; III/2.2: 203	after Z 2293b; text by Gerhardt	11242
45	1.	1726-08-11	Cantata Es ist dir gesagt, Mensch, was gut ist (Trinity VIII)	E maj.	atbSATB 2Fl Ob Oba Str Bc	10: 151	I/18: 197	after Z 5206b–c (/7); text: Meiningen, after Mh 6:8 (/1), Mt 7:22–23 (/4), by Heermann (/7)	00060
45/7	1.	1726-08-11	chorale setting "O Gott, du frommer Gott" (s. 7)	E maj.	SATB	10: 186	III/2.2: 47	after Z 5206b–c; text by Heermann	11297
46	1.	1723-08-01	Cantata Schauet doch und sehet, ob irgend ein Schmerz sei (Trinity X)	D min.	atbSATB Tdt Hn 2Fl 2Odc Str Bc	10: 187	I/19: 109	after Z 5105a (/6); text after Lm 1:12 (/1), by Meyfart (/6)	00061
46/6	1.	1723-08-01	chorale setting "O großer Gott von Macht" (s. 9)	G min.	SATB	10: 236	III/2.2: 45	after Z 5105a; text by Meyfart	11341
47	1.	1726-10-13	Cantata Wer sich selbst erhöhet, der soll erniedriget werden (Trinity XVII)	G min.	sbSATB 2Ob Str Org Bc	10: 239	I/23: 319	after Z 1689a (/5); text by Helbig, after Lk 14:11 (/1)	00062
47/5	1.	1726-10-13	chorale setting "Warum betrübst du dich, mein Herz" (s. 11)	G min.	SATB	10: 274	III/2.2: 52	after Z 1689a	11336
48	1.	1723-10-03	Cantata Ich elender Mensch, wer wird mich erlösen (Trinity XIX)	G min.	atSATB Tr 2Ob Str Bc	10: 275	I/24: 105	after Z 2051 (/3), 4486 (/7); text after Rm 7:24, by Rutilius (/3)	00063
48/3	1.	1723-10-03	chorale setting "Ach Gott und Herr" (s. 4)	B♭ maj.	SATB	10: 288	III/2.1: 30; III/2.2: 166	after Z 2051; text by Rutilius	11197
48/7	1.	1723-10-03	chorale setting "Herr Jesu Christ, ich schrei zu dir" (s. 12)	G min.	SATB	10: 298	III/2.1: 33; III/2.2: 158	after Z 4486	11320
48/7	1.	1723-10-03	chorale setting "Herr Jesu Christ, du höchstes Gut"	G min.	SATB	10: 298	III/2.1: 33; III/2.2: 158	after Z 4486; text by Ringwaldt	11320
49	1.	1726-11-03	Cantata Ich geh und suche mit Verlangen (Trinity XX)	G min.	sb Oba Str Vl Org Bc	10: 299	I/25: 107	after Z 8359; text by Birkmann, Nicolai & after Jer 31:3, Rv 3:20 (/6); /1 → BWV 1053/3	00064
50	1.		Cantata Nun ist das Heil und die Kraft (single movement; arrangement or fragment of a cantata for Michaelmas?)	D maj.	2SATB 3Tr Tmp 3Ob Str Bc	10: 341	I/30: 141	text after Rv 12:10; in SBB P 136	00065
51	1.	1730-09-17	Cantata Jauchzet Gott in allen Landen (Trinity XV)	C maj.	s (2)Tr (Tmp) Str Bc	12^{2}: 1	I/22: 77	after Z 8244 (/4); text after Ps 128:2 & 26:2 (/2), by Gramann (/4)	00066
52	1.	1726-11-24	Cantata Falsche Welt, dir trau ich nicht (Trinity XXIII)	F maj.	sSATB 2Hn 3Ob Bas Str Bc	12^{2}: 25	I/26: 131	after BWV 1046a/1 (/1), Z 2461 (/6); text by Birkmann, Reusner (/6)	00067
54	1.	1714–1717?	Cantata Widerstehe doch der Sünde (Oculi)	E♭ maj.	a 2Vl 2Va Bc	12^{2}: 59	I/18: 3	text by Lehms; → BWV 247/53?	00069
55	1.	1726-11-17	Cantata Ich armer Mensch, ich Sündenknecht (Trinity XXII)	G min.	tSATB Fl Oba Str Bc	12^{2}: 73	I/26: 55	after Z 6551 (/5); text by Birkmann, Rist (/5)	00070
55/5	1.	1726-11-17	chorale setting "Werde munter, mein Gemüte" (s. 6)	B♭ maj.	SATB	12^{2}: 86	III/2.2: 53	after Z 6551; text by Rist	11319
56	1.	1726-10-27	Cantata Ich will den Kreuzstab gerne tragen (Trinity XIX)	G min.	bSATB 2Ob Tai Str Vc Bc	12^{2}: 87	I/24: 173	after Z 6773 (/5); text by Birkmann, Franck, J. (/5)	00071
56/5	1.	1726-10-27	chorale setting "Du, o schönes Weltgebäude" (s. 6)	C Dor.	SATB	12^{2}: 104	III/2.2: 48	after Z 6773; text by Franck, J.	11300
57	1.	1725-12-26	Cantata Selig ist der Mann (Christmas 2)	G min.	sbSATB 2Ob Tai Str Bc	12^{2}: 105	I/3.1: 83	after Z 1912a–c (/8); text by Lehms, Fritsch (/8), after Jm 1:12 (/1)	00072
57/8	1.	1725-12-26	chorale setting "Hast du denn, Jesu, dein Angesicht gänzlich verborgen" (s. 6)	B♭ maj.	SATB	12^{2}: 132	III/2.2: 50	after Z 1912a–c; text by Fritsch	11323
58.2	1.	1733-01-04 or 1734-01-03	Cantata Ach Gott, wie manches Herzeleid (New Year I)	C maj.	sb 2Ob Tai Vl Str Bc	12^{2}: 133	I/4: 217	after BWV 58.1; text by Birkmann, Moller (/1), Behm (/5)	00073
58.1	1.	1727-01-05	Cantata Ach Gott, wie manches Herzeleid (New Year I; early version)	C maj.	sb Vl Str Bc		I/4: 241	after Z 533a (/1, /5); text by Birkmann, Moller (/1), Behm (/5); → BWV 58.2	00074
59	1.	1724-05-28	Cantata Wer mich liebet, der wird mein Wort halten (Pentecost)	C maj.	sbSATB 2Tr Tmp Str Bc	12^{2}: 151	I/13: 65	after Z 7445a (/3); text by Neumeister, Luther (/3), after Jh 14:23 (/1); → BWV 74/1–/2, 175/7	00075
60	1.	1723-11-07	Cantata O Ewigkeit, du Donnerwort (Trinity XXIV)	D maj.	atbSATB Hn 2Oba Str Bc	12^{2}: 169	I/27: 1	after Z 5820 (/1), 7173 (/5); text by Rist (/1), Burmeister (/5), after Rv 14:13 (/4)	00076
60/5	1.	1723-11-07	chorale setting "Es ist genug, so nimm" (s. 5)	A maj.	SATB	12^{2}: 190	III/2.1: 37; III/2.2: 127	after Z 7173; text by Burmeister	11203
61	1.	1714-12-02	Cantata Nun komm, der Heiden Heiland (Advent I – first setting)	A min.	stbSATB Fag 2Vl 2Va Bc	16: 1	I/1: 1	after Z 1174 (/1), 8359 (/6); text by Neumeister, Luther (/1), Nicolai (/6), after Rv 3:20 (/4)	00077
62	1.	1724-12-03	Cantata Nun komm, der Heiden Heiland (Advent I – second setting)	B min.	satbSATB Hn 2Ob Str Bc	16: 19	I/1: 75	after Z 1174; text after Luther	00078
62/6	1.	1724-12-03	chorale setting "Nun komm, der Heiden Heiland" (s. 8)	B min.	SATB	16: 50	III/2.1: 68	after Z 1174; text by Luther	11234
62/6	1.	1724-12-03	chorale setting "Nun komm, der Heiden Heiland" (s. 8)	A min.	SATB		III/2.2: 97	after Z 1174; text by Luther	11234
63	1.	1714-12-25; 1723-12-25	Cantata Christen, ätzet diesen Tag (Christmas; two versions)	C maj.	satbSATB 4Tr Tmp 3Ob Bas Str Bc	16: 51	I/2: 1	text by Heineccius?	00079
64	1.	1723-12-27	Cantata Sehet, welch eine Liebe hat uns der Vater erzeiget (Christmas 3)	E min.	sabSATB Cnt 3Tbn Oba Str Bc	16: 111, 371	I/3.1: 113	after Z 1947 (/2), 5206b–c (/4), 8032 (/8); text after Knauer, 1Jh 3:1 (/1), by Luther (/2), Kindermann (/4), Franck, J. (/8)	00080
64/2	1.	1723-12-27	chorale setting "Gelobet seist du, Jesu Christ" (s. 7)	G maj.	SATB	16: 371	III/2.1: 16; III/2.2: 92	after Z 1947; text by Luther	11179
64/4	1.	1723-12-27	chorale setting "Was frag ich nach der Welt" (s. 1)	D maj.	SATB	16: 372	III/2.1: 16; III/2.2: 151	after Z 5206b–c; text by Kindermann	11180
64/8	1.	1723-12-27	chorale setting "Jesu, meine Freude" (s. 5)	E min.	SATB	16: 132	III/2.1: 15; III/2.2: 80	after Z 8032; text by Franck, J.	11178
65	1.	1724-01-06	Cantata Sie werden aus Saba alle kommen (Epiphany)	C maj.	tbSATB 2Hn 2Fl 2Odc Str Bc	16: 133	I/5: 1	after Z 192b (/2), 7568 (/7); text after Is 60:6 (/1), by Spangenberg (/2), Gerhardt (/7)	00081
65/2	1.	1724-01-06	chorale setting "Ein Kind geboren zu Bethlehem" (s. 4)	A min.	SATB	16: 152	III/2.2: 9	after Z 192b; text by Spangenberg	11342
65/2	1.	1724-01-06	chorale setting "Puer natus in Bethlehem"	A min.	SATB	16: 152	III/2.2: 9	after Z 192b	11342
65/7	1.	1724-01-06	chorale setting "Ich hab in Gottes Herz und Sinn" (s. 10)	A min.	SATB	16: 166	III/2.2: 24	after Z 7568; text by Gerhardt	11337
65/7	1.	1724-01-06	chorale setting "Was mein Gott will, das gscheh allzeit"	A min.	SATB	16: 166	III/2.2: 24	after Z 7568; text by Albert of Prussia	11337
66.2	1.	1724-04-10	Cantata Erfreut euch, ihr Herzen (Easter 2)	D maj.	atbSATB Tr 2Ob Str Bc	16: 167	I/10: 1	after BWV 66.1/8, /1–/4, Z 8584/3	00082
66.2/6	1.	1724-04-10	chorale setting "Alleluja", s. 3 from "Christ ist erstanden"	F♯ min.	SATB	16: 214	III/2.1: 57	after Z 8584/3	11222
66.1	1.	1718-12-10	Secular cantata Der Himmel dacht auf Anhalts Ruhm und Glück (birthday of Leopold of Anhalt-Köthen)		atbSATB 2Ob Bas Str Bc (?)		I/35	text by Hunold; → BWV 66.2/1–/5	00083
67	1.	1724-04-16	Cantata Halt im Gedächtnis Jesum Christ (Quasimodogeniti)	A maj.	atbSATB Hn Fl 2Oba Str Bc	16: 215	I/11.1: 1	after Z 1743 (/4), 4373 (/7); text after 2Ti 2:8 (/1), Jh 20:19 (/6; → BWV 234/2), by Herman (/4), Ebert (/7)	00084
67/7	1.	1724-04-16	chorale setting "Du Friedefürst, Herr Jesu Christ" (s. 1)	A maj.	SATB	16: 246	III/2.1: 10; III/2.2: 25	after Z 4373; text by Ebert	11174
68	1.	1725-05-21	Cantata Also hat Gott die Welt geliebt (Pentecost 2)	D min.	sbSATB Hn Cnt 3Tbn 2Ob Tai Str Vc Bc	16: 247	I/14: 31	after Z 5920 (/1), BWV 208/13 (/2) and /7 (/4); text by Ziegler, C. M., Liscow (/1), after Jh 3:18 (/5)	00085
69.2	1.	1748-08-26	Cantata Lobe den Herrn, meine Seele (council election)	D maj.	satbSATB 3Tr Tmp 3Ob Oba Bas Str Bc	16: 281	I/32.2: 111	after BWV 69.1/1, /3, /5, Z 7247 (/6); text after Knauer, Ps 103:2 (/1), by Luther (/6)	00086
69.2/6	1.	1748-08-26	chorale setting "Es woll uns Gott genädig sein" (s. 3)	D maj.	SATB	16: 325	III/2.2: 192	after Z 7247; text by Luther	11303
69.1	1.	1723-08-15	Cantata Lobe den Herrn, meine Seele (Trinity XII)	D maj.	satbSATB 3Tr Tmp Fl 3Ob Oba Odc Bas Str Bc	16: 373	I/20: 117	after BWV 12/7 (/6); text after Knauer, Ps 103:2 (/1), by Rodigast (/6); → BWV 69.2/1, /3, /5	00087
69.1/6	1.	1723-08-15	chorale setting "Was Gott tut, das ist wohlgetan" (s. 6)	G maj.	SATB	16: 379	III/2.1: 55; III/2.2: 174	after BWV 12/7; text by Rodigast	11219
70.2	1.	1723-11-21	Cantata Wachet! Betet! Betet! Wachet! (Trinity XXVI)	C maj.	satbSATB Tr Ob Str Vc Bc	16: 327	I/27: 107	after BWV 70.1, Z 6543 (/7); text by Franck, S, Keymann (/11)	00088
70.2/11	1.	1716-12-06	chorale setting "Meinen Jesum laß ich nicht, weil" (s. 5)	C maj.	SATB	16: 368	III/2.2: 200	= BWV 70.1/6	11308
70.1	1.	1716-12-06	Cantata Wachet! Betet! Betet! Wachet! (Advent II)	C maj.	satbSATB Tr Ob Str Vc Bc	16: 327	I/1	after Z 3449 (/6); text by Franck, S, Keymann (/6); → BWV 70.2/1, /3, /5, /8, /10, /11	00089
71	1.	1708-02-04	Cantata Gott ist mein König (council election)	D maj.	satbSATB 3Tr Tmp 2Fl Vc 2Ob Bas Str Vne Org	18: 1	I/32.1: 3	after Z 5148 (/2); text by Eilmar?, Heermann & after 2Sm 19:35 & 37 (/2), Ps 74:12 (/1), 16–17 (/4), 19 (/6), Dt 33:25 & Gn 21:22b (/3)	00090
72	1.	1726-01-27	Cantata Alles nur nach Gottes Willen (Epiphany III)	A min.	sabSATB 2Ob Str Bc	18: 55	I/6: 59	after Z 7568 (/6); text by Franck, S, Albert of Prussia (/6); /1 → BWV 235/2	00091
73	1.	1724-01-23	Cantata Herr, wie du willt, so schicks mit mir (Epiphany III)	G min.	stbSATB Hn 2Ob Str Bc	18: 85	I/6: 3	after Z 4441a (/1), 5264b (/5); text by Bienemann (/1), Helmbold (/5)	00092
73/5	1.	1724-01-23	chorale setting "Von Gott will ich nicht lassen" (s. 9)	C min. A min.	SATB	18: 104	III/2.2: 107	after Z 5264b; text by Helmbold	11310
74	1.	1725-05-20	Cantata Wer mich liebet, der wird mein Wort halten (Pentecost)	C maj.	satbSATB 3Tr Tmp 2Ob Odc Str Bc	18: 105	I/13: 83	after BWV 59/1 & /4 (/1–/2), Z 2496 (/8); text by Ziegler, C. M., Gerhardt (/8), after Jh 14:23 (/1), 28 (/4), Rm 8:1 (/6)	00093
74/8	1.	1725-05-20	chorale setting "Gott Vater, sende deinen Geist" (s. 2)	A min.	SATB	18: 146	III/2.1: 78; III/2.2: 212	after Z 2496; text by Gerhardt	11245
74/8	1.	1725-05-20	chorale setting "Kommt her zu mir, spricht Gottes Sohn"	A min.	SATB	18: 146	III/2.1: 78; III/2.2: 212	after Z 2496; text by Grünwald	11245
75	1.	1723-05-30	Cantata Die Elenden sollen essen (Trinity I)	E min.	satbSATB Tr 2Ob Oba Bas Str Bc	18: 147	I/15: 85	after Z 5629 (/7=/14: → BWV 100/6); text after Ps 22:27 (/1), by Rodigast (/7, /14)	00094
76	1.	1723-06-06	Cantata Die Himmel erzählen die Ehre Gottes (Trinity II)	C maj.	satbSATB Tr 2Ob Oba Str Vdg Bc	18: 189	I/16: 1	after Z 7247 (/7=/14); text after Ps 12:2 & 4 (/1), by Luther (/7, /14); /8 ↔ BWV 528/1	00095
77	1.	1723-08-22	Cantata Du sollt Gott, deinen Herren, lieben (Trinity XIII)	C maj.	satbSATB Tdt 2Ob Str Bc	18: 233	I/21: 1	after Z 4431 (/6); text after Knauer, Lk 10:27 (/1), by Denicke? (/6)	00096
77/6	1.	1723-08-22	chorale setting "Wenn einer alle Ding verstünd" (s. 8)?	G min.	SATB	18: 254	III/2.1: 14; III/2.2: 150	after Z 4431; text by Denicke	11176
77/6	1.	1723-08-22	chorale setting "Ach Gott, vom Himmel sieh darein"	G min.	SATB	18: 254	III/2.1: 14; III/2.2: 150	after Z 4431; text by Luther	11176
78	1.	1724-09-10	Cantata Jesu, der du meine Seele (Trinity XIV)	G min.	satbSATB Hn Fl 2Ob Str Vne Bc	18: 255	I/21: 115	after Z 6804; text after Rist	00097
78/7	1.	1724-09-10	chorale setting "Jesu, der du meine Seele" (s. 12)	G min.	SATB	18: 286	III/2.1: 60; III/2.2: 150	after Z 6804; text by Rist	11225
79	1.	1725-10-31	Cantata Gott der Herr ist Sonn und Schild (Reformation Day; two versions: Fl associated with 2nd c.1730)	G maj.	sabSATB 2Hn Tmp (2Fl) 2Ob Str Bc	18: 287	I/31: 1	after Z 5142 (/3), 159 (/6); text after Ps 84:12 (/1), by Rinkart (/3), Helmbold (/6); → BWV 236/2, /4, 234/5	00098
80.3	1.	c. 1735?	Cantata Ein feste Burg ist unser Gott (Reformation Day; 2nd Leipzig v.; Tr & Tmp in BGA likely W. F. Bach's addition)	D maj.	satbSATB 3Ob 2Oba Odc Str Bc	18: 317	I/31: 71	after BWV 80.2 (same text)	00099
80.1	1.	1715-03-24	Cantata Alles, was von Gott geboren (Oculi; music lost)		satb(?)SATB Ob Str Bc		I/8.2: V	after Z 7377 (/1, /6)?; text by Franck, S, Luther (/6); → BWV 80.2	00100
80.2	1.	c. 1729–1731	Cantata Ein feste Burg ist unser Gott (Reformation Day; 1st Leipzig version)	D maj.	sbSATB Ob Str Bc	18: 351	I/31: 65	after Z 7377, BWV 80.1 (/2–/4, /6–/7); text by Franck, S, Luther (/1, /2, /5, /8); → BWV 80.3	00101
80/8	1.	c. 1729–1731	chorale setting "Ein feste Burg ist unser Gott" (s. 4)	D maj.	SATB	18: 378	III/2.1: 29; III/2.2: 162	after Z 7377; text by Luther	11195
81	1.	1724-01-30	Cantata Jesus schläft, was soll ich hoffen? (Epiphany IV)	E min.	atbSATB 2Fl 2Oba Str Bc	20^{1}: 1	I/6: 111	after Z 8032 (/7); text after Ps 10:1 (/2), Mt 8:26 (/4), by Franck, J. (/7)	00102
81/7	1.	1724-01-30	chorale setting "Jesu, meine Freude" (s. 2)	E min.	SATB	20^{1}: 24	III/2.2: 188	after Z 8032; text by Franck, J.	11305
82.1	1.	1727-02-02	Cantata Ich habe genug (Purification; 1st version)	C min.	b Ob Str Bc	20^{1}: 25	I/28.1: 77	text by Birkmann; → BWV 82.2–.4	00103
82.2	1.	1731-02-02	Cantata Ich habe genug (Purification; 2nd version)	E min.	s Fl Str Bc		I/28.1: 155	after BWV 82.1 (same text); → 82.3–.4	00104
82.2/2–/3	1.	c.1731 (AMB)	Notebook A. M. Bach (1725) No. 34 Recitative "Ich habe genug"; Aria "Schlummert ein, ihr matten Augen"	E min.	s Bc	43^{2}: 46	V/4:122	after BWV 82.2; text by Birkmann	00104
82.2/3	1.	c.1731 (AMB)	Notebook A. M. Bach (1725) No. 38 Aria "Schlummert ein, ihr matten Augen" (incomplete)	E min.	s Bc	43^{2}: 49	V/4:122	after BWV 82.2; text by Birkmann	00104
82.3	1.	c.1735	Cantata Ich habe genug (Purification; 3rd version)	C min.	b or mezzo Ob Str Bc		I/28.1: 109	after BWV 82.1–.2 (same text); → 82.4	00105
82.4	1.	1746–1748	Cantata Ich habe genug (Purification; 4th version)	C min.	b (or mezzo) Ob Odc Str Bc		I/28.1: 109	after BWV 82.1–.3 (same text)	00106
83	1.	1724-02-02	Cantata Erfreute Zeit im neuen Bunde (Purification)	F maj.	atbSATB 2Hn 2Ob Vl Str Bc	20^{1}: 51	I/28.1: 3	after Z 3986 (/5); text after Lk 2:29–31 (/2), Hb 4:16 (/3), by Luther (/5)	00107
83/5	1.	1724-02-02	chorale setting "Mit Fried und Freud ich fahr dahin" (s. 4)	D min.	SATB	20^{1}: 76	III/2.2: 188	after Z 3986; text by Luther	11309
84	1.	1727-02-09	Cantata Ich bin vergnügt mit meinem Glücke (Septuagesimae)	E min.	sSATB Ob Str Bc	20^{1}: 77	I/7: 21	after Z 2778 (/5); text after Picander, by E. J. of Schwarzburg-Rudolstadt (/5)	00108
84/5	1.	1727-02-09	chorale setting "Wer weiß, wie nahe mir mein Ende" (s. 12)	B min.	SATB	20^{1}: 98	III/2.1: 27; III/2.2: 63	after Z 2778; text by E. J. of Schwarzburg-Rudolstadt	11192
84/5	1.	1727-02-09	chorale setting "Wer nur den lieben Gott lässt walten"	B min.	SATB	20^{1}: 98	III/2.1: 27; III/2.2: 63	after Z 2778; text by Neumark	11192
85	1.	1725-04-15	Cantata Ich bin ein guter Hirt (Misericordias Domini)	C min.	satbSATB 2Ob Str Vc Bc	20^{1}: 99	I/11.1: 157	after Z 4457 (/3), 2542 (/6); text after Jh 10:12 (/1), by Becker (/3), Homburg (/6)	00109
85/6	1.	1725-04-15	chorale setting "Ist Gott mein Schild und Helfersmann" (s. 4)	C min.	SATB	20^{1}: 118	III/2.1: 74; III/2.2: 69	after Z 2542; text by Homburg	11240
86	1.	1724-05-14	Cantata Wahrlich, wahrlich, ich sage euch (Rogate)	E maj.	satbSATB 2Oba Str Bc	20^{1}: 119	I/12: 45	after Z 2496c (/3), 4430 (/6); text after Jh 16:23 (/1), by Grünwald (/3), Speratus (/6)	00110
86/6	1.	1724-05-14	chorale setting "Es ist das Heil uns kommen her" (s. 11)	E maj.	SATB	20^{1}: 134	III/2.2: 3	after Z 4430; text by Speratus	11322
87	1.	1725-05-06	Cantata Bisher habt ihr nichts gebeten in meinem Namen (Rogate)	D min.	atbSATB 2Ob 2Odc Str Bc	20^{1}: 135	I/12: 61	after Z 8032 (/7); text after Ziegler, C. M., Jh 16:24 (/1), by Müller, H. (/7)	00111
87/7	1.	1725-05-06	chorale setting "Selig ist die Seele" (s. 9)	D min.	SATB	20^{1}: 152	III/2.1: 73; III/2.2: 54	after Z 8032; text by Müller, H.	11239
87/7	1.	1725-05-06	chorale setting "Jesu, meine Freude"	D min.	SATB	20^{1}: 152	III/2.1: 73; III/2.2: 54	after Z 8032; text by Franck, J.	11239
88	1.	1726-07-21	Cantata Siehe, ich will viel Fischer aussenden (Trinity V)	D maj.	satbSATB 2Hn 2Oba Tai Str Bc	20^{1}: 153	I/17.2: 33	after Z 2778 (/7); text: Meiningen, after Jer 16:16 (/1), Lk 5:10 (/4), by Neumark (/7)	00112
88/7	1.	1726-07-21	chorale setting "Wer nur den lieben Gott lässt walten" (s. 7)	B min.	SATB	20^{1}: 178	III/2.2: 58	after Z 2778; text by Neumark	11312
89	1.	1723-10-24	Cantata Was soll ich aus dir machen, Ephraim? (Trinity XXII)	C min.	sabSATB Hn 2Ob Str Bc	20^{1}: 179	I/26: 1	after Z 2164 (/6); text after Hs 11:8 (/1), by Heermann (/6)	00113
89/6	1.	1723-10-24	chorale setting "Wo soll ich fliehen hin" (s. 7)	G min.	SATB	20^{1}: 194	III/2.2: 167	after Z 2164; text by Heermann	11292
90	1.	1723-11-14	Cantata Es reißet euch ein schrecklich Ende (Trinity XXV)	D min.	atbSATB (Tr) Str Bc	20^{1}: 195	I/27: 59	after Z 2561 (/5); text by Moller (/5)	00114
90/5	1.	1723-11-14	chorale setting "Nimm von uns, Herr, du treuer Gott" (s. 7)	D min.	SATB	20^{1}: 214	III/2.1: 33; III/2.2: 158	after Z 2561; text by Moller	11199
90/5	1.	1723-11-14	chorale setting "Vater unser im Himmelreich"	D min.	SATB	20^{1}: 214	III/2.1: 33; III/2.2: 158	after Z 2561; text by Luther	11199
91.2	1.	1746–1747	Cantata Gelobet seist du, Jesu Christ (Christmas; later version)	G maj.	satbSATB 2Hn Tmp 3Ob Str Bc	22: 1	I/2: 131	after BWV 91.1 (same text)	00115
91.1	1.	1724-12-25	Cantata Gelobet seist du, Jesu Christ (Christmas; early version)	G maj.	satbSATB 2Hn Tmp 3Ob Str Bc	22: 1, 333	I/2: 164	after Z 1947; text after Luther; → BWV 91.2	00116
91/6	1.	1724-12-25	chorale setting "Gelobet seist du, Jesu Christ" (s. 7)	G maj.	SATB		III/2.1: 89; III/2.2: 30	after Z 1947; text by Luther	11252
92	1.	1725-01-28	Cantata Ich hab in Gottes Herz und Sinn (Septuagesimae)	B min.	satbSATB 2Oba Str Bc	22: 33	I/7: 41	after Z 7568; text after Gerhardt	00117
93	1.	1724-07-09	Cantata Wer nur den lieben Gott läßt walten (Trinity V)	C min.	satbSATB 2Ob Str Bc	22: 69	I/17.2: 3	after Z 2778; text after Neumark; /4 → BWV 647	00118
94	1.	1724-08-06	Cantata Was frag ich nach der Welt (Trinity IX)	D maj.	satbSATB Fl 2Ob 2Oba Str Bc	22: 95	I/19: 43	after Z 5206b–c; text after Kindermann	00119
94/8	1.	1724-08-06	chorale setting "Was frag ich nach der Welt" (s. 8)	D maj.	SATB	22: 127	III/2.1: 53; III/2.2: 173	after Z 5206b–c; text by Kindermann	11215
95	1.	1723-09-12	Cantata Christus, der ist mein Leben (Trinity XVI)	G maj.	stbSATB Hn or Cnt 2Ob 2Oba Str Bc	22: 129	I/23: 65	after Z 132 & 3986 (/1: → BWV 282), 5404a (/3), 4482 (/7); text by Simon Graf & Luther (/1), Herberger (/3), Herman (/7)	00120
95/7	1.	1723-09-12	chorale setting "Wenn mein Stündlein vorhanden ist" (s. 4)	G maj.	SATB	22: 153	III/2.1: 64	after Z 4482; text by Herman	11229
96	1.	1724-10-08	Cantata Herr Christ, der einge Gottessohn (Trinity XVIII)	F maj.	satbSATB Hn or Tbn Fl/Fl or Vl 2Ob Str Bc	22: 155	I/24: 1	after Z 4297a; text after Cruciger	00121
96/6	1.	1724-10-08	chorale setting "Herr Christ, der einge Gottessohn" (s. 5)	F maj.	SATB	22: 184	III/2.1: 66; III/2.2: 179	after Z 4297a; text by Cruciger	11231
97	1.	1734-07-25? after 1735	Cantata In allen meinen Taten (two versions; Trinity V?)	B♭ maj.	satbSATB 2Ob Str Bc	22: 185, 336	I/34: 197	after Z 2293b; text by Fleming; /9 → BWV 392	00122
97/9	1.	1734-07-25? after 1735	chorale setting "In allen meinen Taten" (s. 9)	B♭ maj.	SATB	22: 230	III/2.1: 49	after Z 2293b; text by Fleming; → BWV 392	11210
97/9	1.	1734-07-25? after 1735	chorale setting "Nun ruhen alle Wälder"	B♭ maj.	SATB	22: 230	III/2.1: 49	after Z 2293b; text by Gerhardt; → BWV 392	11210
98	1.	1726-11-10	Cantata Was Gott tut, das ist wohlgetan (Trinity XXI)	B♭ maj.	satbSATB 2Ob Str Bc	22: 231	I/25: 241	after Z 5629 (/1); text by Birkmann, Rodigast (/1)	00123
99	1.	1724-09-17	Cantata Was Gott tut, das ist wohlgetan (Trinity XV)	G maj.	satbSATB Hn Fl Oba Str Bc	22: 251	I/22: 41	after Z 5629; text after Rodigast; /1 → BWV 100/1	00124
100	1.	1734–1735	Cantata Was Gott tut, das ist wohlgetan	G maj.	satbSATB 2Hn Tmp Fl Oba Str Bc	22: 277	I/34: 239	after Z 5629, BWV 99/1 (/1), 75/7 (/6); text by Rodigast	00125
100/6	1.	1734–1735	chorale setting "Was Gott tut, das ist wohlgetan" (s. 6)	G maj.	SATB	22: 323	III/2.1: 72	after 75/7=/14; text by Rodigast	11238
101	1.	1724-08-13	Cantata Nimm von uns, Herr, du treuer Gott (Trinity X)	D min.	satbSATB 2Hn Tmp Fl Oba Str Bc	23: 1	I/19: 173	after Z 2561; text after Moller	00126
101/7	1.	1724-08-13	chorale setting "Nimm von uns, Herr, du treuer Gott" (s. 7)	D min.	SATB	23: 32	III/2.1: 54; III/2.2: 174	after Z 2561; text by Moller	11216
102	1.	1726-08-25	Cantata Herr, deine Augen sehen nach dem Glauben (Trinity X)	G min.	atbSATB Fl Vl 2Ob Str Bc	23: 33	I/19: 229	after Z 2561 (/7); text: Meiningen, after Jer 5:3 (/1: → BWV 235/1), Rm 2:4–5 (/4), by Heermann (/7); /3 & /5 → BWV 233/4 & /5	00127
102/7	1.	1726-08-25	chorale setting "So wahr ich lebe, spricht dein Gott" (ss. 6–7)	C min.	SATB	23: 66	III/2.2: 62	after Z 2561; text by Heermann	11334
102/7	1.	1726-08-25	chorale setting "Vater unser im Himmelreich"	C min.	SATB	23: 66	III/2.2: 62	after Z 2561; text by Luther	11334
103	1.	1725-04-22; 1731-04-15	Cantata Ihr werdet weinen und heulen (Jubilate, 2 versions)	B min.	atSATB Tr Fl Fl (or) Vl 2Oba Str Bc	23: 67	I/11.2: 25	after Z 7568 (/6); text by Ziegler, C. M., Gerhardt (/6)	00128
103/6	1.	1725-04-22; 1731-04-15	chorale setting "Barmherzger Vater, höchster Gott" (s. 9)	B min.	SATB	23: 94	III/2.1: 72; III/2.2: 68	after Z 7568; text by Gerhardt	11237
103/6	1.	1725-04-22; 1731-04-15	chorale setting "Ich hab in Gottes Herz und Sinn"	B min.	SATB	23: 94	III/2.1: 72; III/2.2: 68	after Z 7568; text by Gerhardt	11237
103/6	1.	1725-04-22; 1731-04-15	chorale setting "Was mein Gott will, das gscheh allzeit"	B min.	SATB	23: 94	III/2.1: 72; III/2.2: 68	after Z 7568; text by Albert of Prussia	11237
104	1.	1724-04-23	Cantata Du Hirte Israel, höre (Misericordias)	G maj.	tbSATB 2Ob 2Oba Tai Str Bc	23: 95	I/11.1: 113	after Z 4457 (/6); text after Ps 80:2 (/1), by Becker (/6)	00129
104/6	1.	1724-04-23	chorale setting "Der Herr ist mein getreuer Hirt" (s. 1)	A maj.	SATB	23: 116	III/2.2: 189	after Z 4457; text by Becker	11283
104/6	1.	1724-04-23	chorale setting "Allein Gott in der Höh sei Ehr"	A maj.	SATB	23: 116	III/2.2: 189	after Z 4457; text by Decius	11283
104/6	1.	1724-04-23	chorale setting "Allein Gott in der Höh sei Ehr"	G maj.	SATB		III/2.2: 71	after Z 4457; text by Decius	11290
105	1.	1723-07-25	Cantata Herr, gehe nicht ins Gericht mit deinem Knecht (Trinity IX)	G min.	satbSATB Hn 2Ob Str Bc	23: 117	I/19: 1	after Z 6804 (/6); text after Ps 143:2 (/1), by Rist (/6)	00130
105/6	1.	1723-07-25	chorale setting "Jesu, der du meine Seele" (s. 11)	G min.	SATB	23: 146	III/2.1: 52	after Z 6804; text by Rist	11214
106	1.	1708-09-16?	Cantata Gottes Zeit ist die allerbeste Zeit (funeral; aka Actus tragicus)	E♭ maj.	satbSATB 2Fl 2Vdg Bc	23: 147	I/34: 1	after Z 1680 (/2d), 3986 (/3b), 2461 (/4); text after Olearius, J., Acts 17:28 & Ps 90:12 & Is 38:1 & JS 14:18 & Rv 22:20 (/2), Ps 31:6 & Lk 23:43 & by Luther (/3), Reusner (/4)	00131
107	1.	1724-07-23	Cantata Was willst du dich betrüben (Trinity VII)	B min.	stbSATB Hn 2Fl 2Oba Str Bc	23: 179	I/18: 55	after Z 5264b; text by Heermann	00132
108	1.	1725-04-29	Cantata Es ist euch gut, daß ich hingehe (Cantate)	A maj.	atbSATB 2Oba Str Bc	23: 203	I/12: 17	after Z 2496 (/6); text by Ziegler, C. M., Gerhardt (/6), after Jh 16:7 (/1), 13 (/4)	00133
108/6	1.	1725-04-29	chorale setting "Gott Vater, sende deinen Geist" (s. 10)	B min.	SATB	23: 230	III/2.1: 69; III/2.2: 26	after Z 2496; text by Gerhardt	11235
108/6	1.	1725-04-29	chorale setting "Kommt her zu mir, spricht Gottes Sohn"	B min.	SATB	23: 230	III/2.1: 69; III/2.2: 26	after Z 2496; text by Grünwald	11235
109	1.	1723-10-17	Cantata Ich glaube, lieber Herr, hilf meinem Unglauben (Trinity XXI; 2 versions)	D min.	atSATB (Hn) 2Ob Str Bc	23: 231	I/25: 157	after Z 7549 (/6); text after Mk 9:24 (/1), by Spengler (/6)	00134
110	1.	1725-12-25	Cantata Unser Mund sei voll Lachens (Christmas)	D maj.	satbSATB 3Tr Tmp 2Fl 3Ob Oba Odc Bas Str Bc	23: 263	I/2: 71	after Z 2072 (/7); text by Lehms, Füger (/7), after Ps 126:2–3 (/1), Jer 10:6 (/3), Lk 2:14 (/5)	00135
110/7	1.	1725-12-25	chorale setting "Wir Christenleut" (s. 5)	B min.	SATB	23: 324	III/2.2: 32	after Z 2072; text by Füger	11316
111	1.	1725-01-25	Cantata Was mein Gott will, das g'scheh allzeit (Epiphany III)	A min.	satbSATB 2Ob Str Bc	24: 1	I/6: 27	after Z 7568; text after Albert of Prussia	00136
112	1.	1731-04-08	Cantata Der Herr ist mein getreuer Hirt (Misericordias)	G maj.	satbSATB 2Hn 2Oba Str Bc	24: 29	I/11.1: 179	after Z 4457; text by Meuslin after Ps. 23	00137
112/5	1.	1731-04-08	chorale setting "Der Herr ist mein getreuer Hirt" (s. 5)	G maj.	SATB	24: 48	III/2.1: 71; III/2.2: 183, 202	after Z 4457; text by Meuslin after Ps. 23	11236
112/5	1.	1731-04-08	chorale setting "Allein Gott in der Höh sei Ehr"	G maj.	SATB	24: 48	III/2.1: 71; III/2.2: 183, 202	after Z 4457; text by Decius	11236
113	1.	1724-08-20	Cantata Herr Jesu Christ, du höchstes Gut (Trinity XI)	B min.	satbSATB Fl 2Oba Str Bc	24: 49	I/20: 79	after Z 4486; text after Ringwaldt	00138
113/8	1.	1724-08-20	chorale setting "Herr Jesu Christ, du höchstes Gut" (s. 8)	B min.	SATB	24: 80	III/2.1: 54; III/2.2: 175	after Z 4486; text by Ringwaldt	11217
114	1.	1724-10-01	Cantata Ach, lieben Christen, seid getrost (Trinity XVII)	G min.	satbSATB Hn Fl 2Ob Str Bc	24: 81	I/23: 287	after Z 4441a; text after Gigas	00139
114/7	1.	1724-10-01	chorale setting "Ach, lieben Christen, seid getrost" (s. 6)	G min.	SATB	24: 108	III/2.1: 65; III/2.2: 179	after Z 4441a; text by Gigas	11230
115	1.	1724-11-05	Cantata Mache dich, mein Geist, bereit (Trinity XXII)	G maj.	satbSATB Hn Fl Oba Str Vc Bc	24: 109	I/26: 21	after Z 6274a; text after Freystein	00140
115/6	1.	1724-11-05	chorale setting "Mache dich, mein Geist, bereit" (s. 10)	G maj.	SATB	24: 132	III/2.1: 25; III/2.2: 23	after Z 6274a; text by Freystein	11190
115/6	1.	1724-11-05	chorale setting "Straf mich nicht in deinem Zorn"	G maj.	SATB	24: 132	III/2.1: 25; III/2.2: 23	after Z 6274a; text by Albinus	11190
116	1.	1724-11-26	Cantata Du Friedefürst, Herr Jesu Christ (Trinity XXV)	A maj.	satbSATB Hn 2Oba Str Bc	24: 133	I/27: 79	after Z 4373; text after Ebert	00141
117	1.	1728–1731	Cantata Sei Lob und Ehr dem höchsten Gut	G maj.	atbSATB 2Fl 2Ob 2Oba Str Bc	24: 159	I/34: 151	after Z 4430; text by Schütz, J. J.	00142
117/4; 117/9	1.	1728–1731	chorale setting "Sei Lob und Ehr dem höchsten Gut" (ss. 4, 9)	G maj.	SATB	24: 159	III/2.1: 71; III/2.2: 203	after Z 4430; text by Schütz, J. J.	11172
117/4; 117/9	1.	1728–1731	chorale setting "Sei Lob und Ehr dem höchsten Gut"	G maj.	SATB	24: 159	III/2.1: 9 III/2.2: 147	after Z 4430; text by Schütz, J. J.	11173
119	1.	1723-08-30	Cantata Preise, Jerusalem, den Herrn (council election)	C maj.	satbSATB 4Tr Tmp 2Fl 3Ob 2Odc Str Bc	24: 193	I/32.1: 129	after Z 8652 (/9); text after Ps 147:12–14 (/1), by Luther (/9)	00144
120.1	1.	1729 or earlier	Cantata Gott, man lobet dich in der Stille (council election)	A maj.	satbSATB 3Tr 2Ob 2Oba **Vl** Str Bc	24: 247	I/32.2: 53	after Z 8652 (/6); text after Ps 65:2 (/1), by Luther (/6); ↔ BWV 120.2/6 (/1 → .3/1), /1 (/2 → .3/2), /3 (/4 ↔ 1019a/3 → .3/4)	00145
120.2	1.	1729?	Cantata Herr Gott, Beherrscher aller Dinge (wedding; incomplete)	D maj.	satbSATB 3Tr Tmp 2Ob 2Oba Str Org Bc	41: 149	I/33: 75	after BWV 1006/1 (/4 → 29/1), 137/5 (/8); text after JS 50:24 (/2), by Luther (/5), Neander (/8); ↔ BWV 120.1/2 (/1 → .3/2), /4 (/3 ↔ 1019a/3 → .3/4), /1 (/6 → .3/1)	00146
120.3	1.	1730-06-26	Cantata Gott, man lobet dich in der Stille (200th anniversary of the Augsb. Confess.; music lost, partially reconstructable)		saSATB 3Tr Tmp 2Oba Vl Str Bc ?		I/34; I/32.2	after BWV 120.1/1 (=.2/6), /2 (=.2/1 → 232^{II}/9), /4 (=.2/3 ↔ 1019a/3); text by Picander	00147
121	1.	1724-12-26	Cantata Christum wir sollen loben schon (Christmas 2)	E min.	satbSATB Cnt 3Tbn Oba Str Bc	26: 1	I/3.1: 57	after Z 297c, text after Luther	00148
121/6	1.	1724-12-26	chorale setting "Christum wir sollen loben schon" (s. 8)	E min.	SATB	26: 20	III/2.2: 31	after Z 297c, text by Luther	11284
122	1.	1724-12-31	Cantata Das neugeborne Kindelein (Christmas I)	G min.	satbSATB 3Fl 2Ob Tai Str Bc	26: 21	I/3.2: 53	after Z 491; text after Schneegaß	00149
122/6	1.	1724-12-31	chorale setting "Das neugeborne Kindelein" (s. 5)	G min.	SATB	26: 40	III/2.1: 43; III/2.2: 30, 101	after Z 491; text by Schneegaß	11207
123	1.	1725-01-06	Cantata Liebster Immanuel, Herzog der Frommen (Epiphany)	B min.	atbSATB 2Fl 2Oba Str Bc	26: 41	I/5: 47	after Z 4932c; text after Fritsch	00150
123/6	1.	1725-01-06	chorale setting "Liebster Immanuel, Herzog der Frommen" (s. 6)	B min.	SATB	26: 60	III/2.2: 108	after Z 4932c; text by Fritsch	11340
124	1.	1725-01-07	Cantata Meinen Jesum laß ich nicht (Epiphany I)	E maj.	satbSATB Hn Oba Str Bc	26: 61	I/5: 115	after Z 3449; text after Keymann	00151
125	1.	1725-02-02	Cantata Mit Fried und Freud ich fahr dahin (Purification)	E min.	atbSATB Hn Fl Ob Oba Str Bc	26: 83	I/28.1: 31	after Z 3986; text after Luther	00152
126	1.	1725-02-04	Cantata Erhalt uns, Herr, bei deinem Wort (Sexagesimae)	A min.	atbSATB Tr 2Ob Str Bc	26: 111	I/7: 155	after Z 350a, 1945b (/6); text after Luther, Jonas, Walter	00153
126/6	1.	1725-02-04	chorale setting "Verleih uns Frieden gnädiglich" (ss. 1–2)	A min.	SATB	26: 131	III/2.2: 126 (in g)	after Z 1945b; text by Luther, Walter	11335
127	1.	1725-02-11	Cantata Herr Jesu Christ, wahr' Mensch und Gott (Estomihi)	F maj.	stbSATB Tr 2Fl 2Ob Str Bc	26: 133	I/8: 107	after Z 2570; text after Eber; /1 → BWV 127/1 (variant)	00154
127/5	1.	1725-02-11	chorale setting "Herr Jesu Christ, wahr' Mensch und Gott" (s. 8)	F maj.	SATB	26: 160	III/2.1: 46; III/2.2: 169	after Z 2570; text by Eber	11209
127/1 (var.)	1.	c.1750	Chorus "Herr Jesu Christ, wahr' Mensch und Gott" (Passion oratorio movement)	E♭ maj.	SATB 2Fl 2Ob Str Bc		I/41: 95	after BWV 127/1; → BC D 10	00155
128	1.	1725-05-10	Cantata Auf Christi Himmelfahrt allein (Ascension)	G maj.	atbSATB Tr 2Hn 2Ob 2Oba Odc Str Bc	26: 163	I/12: 101	after Z 4457 (/1), 5206b (/5); text by Ziegler, C. M., Sonnemann (/1), Avenarius (/5)	00156
129	1.	1727-06-08	Cantata Gelobet sei der Herr, mein Gott (Trinity)	D maj.	sabSATB 3Tr Tmp Fl 2Ob Oba Str Bc	26: 185	I/15: 37	after Z 5206b; text by Olearius, J.	00157
129/5	1.	1727-06-08	chorale setting "Gelobet sei der Herr, mein Gott" (s. 5)	D maj.	SATB	26: 224	III/2.1: 80	after Z 5206b; text by Olearius, J.	11246
129/5	1.	1727-06-08	chorale setting "O Gott, du frommer Gott"	D maj.	SATB	26: 224	III/2.1: 80	after Z 5206b; text by Heermann	11246
130.1	1.	1724-09-29	Cantata Herr Gott, dich loben alle wir (Michaelmas; 1st version)	C maj.	satbSATB 3Tr Tmp Fl 3Ob Str Bc	26: 231	I/30: 1	after Z 368; text after Eber; → BWV 130.2	00158
130/6	1.	1724-09-29	chorale setting "Herr Gott, dich loben alle wir" (s. 11)	C maj.	SATB	26: 268	III/2.1: 61; III/2.2: 218	after Z 368; text by Eber	11226
130.2	1.	1732–1735	Cantata Herr Gott, dich loben alle wir (Michaelmas; 2nd version)	C maj.	satbSATB 3Tr Tmp Fl 3Ob Str Bc		I/30: 48	after BWV 130.1 (same text)	00159
131	1.	1707	Cantata Aus der Tiefen rufe ich, Herr, zu dir	G min.	satbSATB Ob Bas Str Bc	28: 1	I/34: 67	after Z 4486 (/2, /4); text after Ps. 130, by Ringwaldt (/2, /4); → BWV 131a	00160
132	1.	1715-12-22	Cantata Bereitet die Wege, bereitet die Bahn (Advent IV)	A maj.	satbSATB Ob Bas Str Vc Bc	28: 33	I/1: 99 rev 2: 97	text by Franck, S., Cruciger (/6)	00162
133	1.	1724-12-27	Cantata Ich freue mich in dir (Christmas 3)	A maj.	satbSATB Cnt 2Oba Str Bc	28: 51	I/3.1: 135	↔ Z 5187; text after Ziegler, C.	00163
133/6	1.	1724-12-27	chorale setting "Ich freue mich in dir" (s. 4)	D maj.	SATB	28: 80	III/2.1: 44; III/2.2: 34	↔ Z 5187; text by Ziegler, C.	11208
134.3	1.	1731-03-27; 1735-04-12	Cantata Ein Herz, das seinen Jesum lebend weiß (Easter 3; later version)	B♭ maj.	atSATB 2Ob Str Bc	28: 81	I/10: 69	after BWV 134.2	00164
134.2	1.	1724-04-11	Cantata Ein Herz, das seinen Jesum lebend weiß (Easter 3; early version)	B♭ maj.	atSATB 2Ob Str Bc	28: 81, 287	I/10: 106	after BWV 134.1; → BWV 134.3	00165
134.1	1.	1719-01-01	Secular cantata Die Zeit, die Tag und Jahre macht (congratulation for New Year)	B♭ maj.	atSATB 2Ob Str Bc	29: 209	I/35: 49	text by Hunold; → BWV 134.2	00166
135	1.	1724-06-25	Cantata Ach Herr, mich armen Sünder (Trinity III)	E min.	atbSATB Cnt Tbn 2Ob Str Bc	28: 119	I/16: 197	after Z 5385a; text after Schneegaß	00167
136	1.	1723-07-18	Cantata Erforsche mich, Gott, und erfahre mein Herz (Trinity VIII)	A min.	atbSATB Hn 2Ob 2Oba Str Bc	28: 137	I/18: 129	after Z 2164 (/6); text after Ps 139:23 (/1: → BWV 234/6), by Heermann (/6)	00168
136/6	1.	1723-07-18	chorale setting "Wo soll ich fliehen hin" (s. 9)	B min.	SATB	28: 164	III/2.2: 191	after Z 2164; text by Heermann	11293
137	1.	1725-08-19	Cantata Lobe den Herren, den mächtigen König der Ehren (Trinity XII)	C maj.	satbSATB 3Tr Tmp 2Ob Str Bc	28: 165	I/20: 171	after Z 1912a–c; text by Neander; /2 → BWV 650; /5 → 120.2/8	00169
137/5	1.	1725-08-19	chorale setting "Lobe den Herren, den mächtigen König der Ehren" (s. 5)	C maj.	SATB	28: 196	III/2.1: 56	after Z 1912a–c; text by Neander; → BWV 120.2/8	11220
137/5	1.	1725-08-19	chorale setting "Hast du denn, Jesu, dein Angesicht gänzlich verborgen"	C maj.	SATB	28: 196	III/2.1: 56	after Z 1912a–c; text by Fritsch	11220
138	1.	1723-09-05	Cantata Warum betrübst du dich, mein Herz (Trinity XV)	B min.	satbSATB 2Oba Str Bc	28: 197	I/22: 19	after Z 1689a; /4 → BWV 236/3	00170
139	1.	1724-11-12	Cantata Wohl dem, der sich auf seinen Gott (Trinity XXIII)	E maj.	satbSATB 2Oba Str Bc	28: 223	I/26: 97	after Z 2383; text after Rube	00171
140	1.	1731-11-25	Cantata Wachet auf, ruft uns die Stimme (Trinity XXVII)	E♭ maj.	stbSATB Hn 2Ob Tai Vl Str Bc	28: 249	I/27: 149	after Z 8405a, text after Nicolai; /4 → BWV 645	00172
140/7	1.	1731-11-25	chorale setting "Wachet auf, ruft uns die Stimme" (s. 3)	E♭ maj.	SATB	28: 284	III/2.1: 19; III/2.2: 101	after Z 8405a, text by Nicolai	11183
143	1.	c. 1709–1711?	Cantata Lobe den Herrn, meine Seele (New Year)	B♭ maj.	stbSATB 3Hn Tmp Bas Str Bc	30: 43	I/4: 165 rev 2: 3	after Z 4373; text after Ps 146, by Ebert (/2, /7)	00175
143	1.	c. 1709–1711?	Cantata Lobe den Herrn, meine Seele (New Year)	C maj.	stbSATB 3Tr Tmp Bas Str Bc		rev 2: 119	after Z 4373; text after Ps 146, by Ebert (/2, /7)	00175
144	1.	1724-02-06	Cantata Nimm, was dein ist, und gehe hin (Septuagesima)	B min.	satSATB 2Ob Oba Str Bc	30: 75	I/7: 1	after Z 5629 (/3), 7568 (/6); text after Mt 20:14 (/1), by Rodigast (/3), Albert of Prussia (/6)	00176
144/3	1.	1724-02-06	chorale setting "Was Gott tut, das ist wohlgetan" (s. 1)	G maj.	SATB	30: 87	III/2.1: 34; III/2.2: 36	after Z 5629; text by Rodigast	11204
144/6	1.	1724-02-06	chorale setting "Was mein Gott will, das g'scheh allzeit" (s. 1)	B min.	SATB	30: 92	III/2.1: 35; III/2.2: 157	after Z 7568; text by Albert of Prussia	11205
145/1–5	1.	1729-04-19	Cantata Ich lebe, mein Herze, zu deinem Ergötzen (Easter 3)	D maj.	stbSATB Tr Fl 2Ob Str Bc	30: 104	I/10: 111	by Bach, C. P. E.?; after Z 1743 (/5); text by Picander, Herman (/5)	00177
145/5	1.	1729-04-19	chorale setting "Erschienen ist der herrlich Tag" (s. 14)	F♯ min.	SATB	30: 122	III/2.2: 214	by Bach, C. P. E.?; after Z 1743; text by Herman	11321
145/5	1.	1729-04-19	chorale setting "Erschienen ist der herrlich Tag"	E min.	SATB		III/2.2: 12	by Bach, C. P. E.?; after Z 1743; text by Herman	11321
145/a	1.		chorale setting "Auf, mein Herz, des Herren Tag" (s. 1)	D maj.	SATB (or) Org	30: 93	III/2.2: 195	by Bach, C. P. E.; after Z 3432b; text by Neumann	10584
145/a	1.		chorale setting "Jesus, meine Zuversicht"	D maj.	SATB (or) Org	30: 93	III/2.2: 195	by Bach, C. P. E.; after Z 3432b; text by L. H. of Brandenb.	09019
146	1.	1726-05-12 or 1727-05-04	Cantata Wir müssen durch viel Trübsal (Jubilate)	D min.	satbSATB Fl 2Ob 2Oba Tai Str **Org** Bc	30: 123	I/11.2: 65	after Z 6551 (/8); text after Acts 14:22 (/2); /1 & /2 ↔ BWV 1052/1 & /2	00179
147.2	1.	1723-07-02	Cantata Herz und Mund und Tat und Leben (Visitation)	D maj.	satbSATB Tr 2Ob Oba 2Odc Str Bc	30: 191	I/28: 63	after BWV 147.1/1–5 (/1, /3, /7, /5, /9), Z 6551 (/6, /10); text by Franck, S. (/1, /3, /7, /5, /9), Janus (/6, /10)	00180
147.1	1.	1716-12-20	Cantata Herz und Mund und Tat und Leben (Advent IV)	D maj.	satbSATB Tr Ob Str Bc		I/1	text by Franck, S., Kolross (/6); /1–/5 → BWV 147.2/1, /3, /7, /5, /9	00181
148	1.	1723-09-19	Cantata Bringet dem Herrn Ehre seines Namens (Trinity XVII)	D maj.	atSATB Tr 2Oba Odc Str Bc	30: 235	I/23: 253	after Z 2164 (/6); text after Picander	00182
148/6	1.	1723-09-19	chorale setting "Wo soll ich fliehen hin"	F♯ min. F min.	SATB	30: 260	III/2.2: 16	after Z 2164; text by Heermann	11291
149	1.	1729-09-29	Cantata Man singet mit Freuden vom Sieg (Michaelmas)	D maj.	satbSATB 3Tr Tmp 3Ob Bas Str Vne Bc	30: 261	I/30: 97	after BWV 208/15 (/1), Z 8326 (/7); text by Picander, Schalling (/7)	00183
149/1a	1.	Fall 1729	Cantata opening: "Concerto" (incomplete; abandoned alternative start of BWV 149?)	D maj.	SATB 3Tr Tmp 2Ob Str Bc		I/40; I/30	in SBB P 175; was BWV Anh. 198	01509
150	1.	1707-07-10	Cantata Nach dir, Herr, verlanget mich (Trinity III)	B min.	satbSATB Bas 2Vl Bc	30: 301	I/41: 3	text after Ps 25 (/2, /4, /6)	00184
151	1.	1725-12-27	Cantata Süßer Trost, mein Jesus kömmt (Christmas 3)	G maj.	satbSATB Fl Vl Oba Str Bc	32: 1	I/3.1: 169	after Z 198 (/5); text by Lehms, Herman (/5)	00185
151/5	1.	1725-12-27	chorale setting "Lobt Gott, ihr Christen allzugleich" (s. 8)	G maj.	SATB	32: 16	III/2.2: 30	after Z 198; text by Herman	11307
152	1.	1714-12-30	Cantata Tritt auf die Glaubensbahn (Christmas I)	E min.	sb Fl Ob Va Vdg Bc	32: 17	I/3.2: 3	text by Franck, S.; /1 ↔ BWV 536/2, → 536a/2	00186
153	1.	1724-01-02	Cantata Schau, lieber Gott, wie meine Feind (Christmas II)	A min.	atbSATB Str Bc	32: 41	I/4: 199	after Z 4431 (/1), 5385a (/5), 533a (/9); text by Denicke (/1), Gerhardt (/5), Moller (/9), after Is 14:10 (/3)	00187
153/1	1.	1724-01-02	chorale setting "Schau, lieber Gott, wie meine Feind" (s. 1)	A min.	SATB	32: 43	III/2.2: 3	after Z 4431; text by Denicke	11288
153/1	1.	1724-01-02	chorale setting "Ach Gott, vom Himmel sieh darein"	A min.	SATB	32: 43	III/2.2: 3	after Z 4431; text by Martin Luther	11288
153/5	1.	1724-01-02	chorale setting "Befiehl du deine Wege" (s. 5)	A min.	SATB	32: 46	III/2.2: 14	after Z 5385a; text by Gerhardt	11326
153/5	1.	1724-01-02	chorale setting "Herzlich tut mich verlangen"	A min.	SATB	32: 46	III/2.2: 14	after Z 5385a; text by Knoll	11326
153/9	1.	1724-01-02	chorale setting "Ach Gott, wie manches Herzeleid" (ss. 16–18)	C maj.	SATB	32: 58	III/2.2: 128	after Z 533a; text by Moller	11282
154	1.	1724-01-09	Cantata Mein liebster Jesus ist verloren (Epiphany I)	B min.	atbSATB 2Oba Str Hc Bc	32: 59	I/5: 89	after Z 6551 (/3), 3449 (/8); text by Janus (/3), Keymann (/8), after Lk 2:49; /3 → BWV 359	00188
154/3	1.	1724-01-09	chorale setting "Jesu, meiner Seelen Wonne" (s. 2)	A maj.	SATB	32: 65	III/2.1: 87; III/2.2: 137	after Z 6551; text by Janus; → BWV 359	11249
154/3	1.	1724-01-09	chorale setting "Werde munter, mein Gemüte"	A maj.	SATB	32: 65	III/2.1: 87; III/2.2: 137	after Z 6551; text by Rist	11249
154/8	1.	1724-01-09	chorale setting "Meinen Jesum lass ich nicht, weil" (s. 6)	D maj.	SATB	32: 82	III/2.1: 88; III/2.2: 88	after Z 3449; text by Keymann	11251
155	1.	1716-01-19; 1724-01-16	Cantata Mein Gott, wie lang, ach lange? (Epiphany II)	D min.	satbSATB Bas Str Bc	32: 83	I/5: 173	after Z 4430 (/5); text by Franck, S., Speratus (/5)	00189
155/5	1.	1716-01-19; 1724-01-16	chorale setting "Es ist das Heil uns kommen her" (s. 12)	F maj.	SATB	32: 96	III/2.2: 194	after Z 4430; text by Speratus	11302
156	1.	1727-01-26 or 1729-01-23	Cantata Ich steh mit einem Fuß im Grabe (Epiphany III)	F maj.	satbSATB Ob Str Bc	32: 97	I/6: 91	after Z 2383 (/2), 4438 (/6); text by Picander, Schein (/2), Bienemann (/6); /1 ↔ BWV 1056/2	00190
156/6	1.	1727-01-26 or 1729-01-23	chorale setting "Herr, wie du willt, so schicks mit mir" (s. 1)	C maj.	SATB	32: 114	III/2.2: 185	after Z 4438; text by Bienemann	11294
157.2	1.	after 1727-02-06	Cantata Ich lasse dich nicht, du segnest mich denn (funeral; later: Purification)	B min.	tbSATB Fl Ob Oba Va 2Vl Bc	32: 115	I/34: 41	after Z 3449 (/5), BWV 157.1 (same text)	00191
157.1	1.	1727-02-06	Cantata Ich lasse dich nicht, du segnest mich denn (funeral)		tbSATB Fl Oba Va Bc		I/34	text by Picander, Keymann (/5), after Gen 32:27 (/1); → BWV 157.2	11366
158	1.	c. 1725–1735	Cantata Der Friede sei mit dir (Purification; later: Easter 3)	D maj.	sbSATB Ob Vl Bc	32: 141	I/10: 129	after Z 6531 (/2), 7012a (/4); text by Albinus (/2), Luther (/4; ↔ BWV 279)	00192
158/4	1.	c. 1725–1735	chorale setting "Christ lag in Todes Banden" (s. 5)	E min.	SATB	32: 154	III/2.1: 24; III/2.2: 155	after Z 7012a; text by Luther; ↔ BWV 279	11187
159	1.	1729-02-27	Cantata Sehet, wir gehn hinauf gen Jerusalem (Estomihi)	C min.	satbSATB Ob Str Bc	32: 155	I/8: 153	after Z 5385a (/2), 6288a–b (/5); text by Picander, Gerhardt (/2), Stockmann (/5), after Lk 18:31 (/1), Jh 19:30 (/4)	00193
159/5	1.	1729-02-27	chorale setting "Jesu Leiden, Pein und Tod" (s. 33)	E♭ maj.	SATB	32: 168	III/2.1: 41; III/2.2: 33	after 6288a–b; text by Stockmann	11206
161	1.	1716-09-27	Cantata Komm, du süße Todesstunde (Trinity XVI; 1st version)	C maj.	atSATB 2Fl Str Org Bc	33: 1	I/23: 1, 33	after Z 5385a; text by Franck, S., Knoll; → BWV 161, v2	00195
161/6	1.	1716-09-27	chorale setting "Herzlich tut mich verlangen" (s. 4)	A min.	SATB	33: 27	III/2.1: 29; III/2.2: 160	after Z 5385a; text by Knoll	11194
161/6	1.	1716-09-27	chorale setting "Befiehl du deine Wege"	A min.	SATB	33: 27	III/2.1: 29; III/2.2: 160	after Z 5385a; text by Gerhardt	11194
161, v2	1.	1723–1750?	Cantata Komm, du süße Todesstunde (Trinity XVI; 2nd version)	C maj.	satSATB 2Fl Str Bc		I/23: 33	after BWV 161; text by Franck, S., Knoll	00196
162.1	1.	1716-10-25	Cantata Ach! ich sehe, itzt, da ich zur Hochzeit gehe (Trinity XX)	A min.	satbSATB Str Bc		I/25: 1	after Z 6783 (/6); text by Franck, S., Rosenmüller (/6); → BWV 162.2	00197
162.2	1.	1723-10-10	Cantata Ach! ich sehe, itzt, da ich zur Hochzeit gehe (Trinity XX)	B min.	satbSATB Hn Str Bc	33: 29 (in a)	I/25: 23	after BWV 162.1 (same text)	11367
163	1.	1715-11-24	Cantata Nur jedem das Seine (Trinity XXIII)	B min.	satbSATB Str 2Vc Bc	33: 47	I/26: 77	after Z 3449 (/5), 2177 (/6); text by Franck, S., Heermann (/6)	00198
164	1.	1725-08-26	Cantata Ihr, die ihr euch von Christo nennet (Trinity XIII)	G min.	satbSATB 2Fl 2Ob Str Bc	33: 65	I/21: 57	after Z 4297a (/6); text by Franck, S., Cruciger (/6)	00199
164/6	1.	1725-08-26	chorale setting "Herr Christ, der einge Gottes Sohn" (s. 5)	B♭ maj.	SATB	33: 88	III/2.1: 59; III/2.2: 57	after Z 4297a; text by Cruciger	11224
165	1.	1715-06-16; 1724-06-04	Cantata O heilges Geist- und Wasserbad (Trinity)	G maj.	satbSATB Fag Str Bc	33: 89	I/15: 1	after Z 159 (/6); text by Franck, S., Helmbold (/6)	00200
166	1.	1724-05-07	Cantata Wo gehest du hin? (Cantate)	B♭ maj.	satbSATB Ob Str Bc	33: 105	I/12: 1	after Z 4486 (/3), 2778 (/6); text by Franck, S., Ringwaldt (/3), E. J. of Schwarzburg-Rudolstadt (/6), after Jh 16:5 (/1); /2 → BWV 584	00201
166/6	1.	1724-05-07	chorale setting "Wer weiß, wie nahe mir mein Ende" (s. 1)	G min.	SATB	33: 122	III/2.2: 116	after 2778; text by E. J. of Schwarzburg-Rudolstadt	11311
167	1.	1723-06-24	Cantata Ihr Menschen, rühmet Gottes Liebe (24 June: feast of John the Baptist)	G maj.	satbSATB Tr Ob Odc Str Bc	33: 123	I/29: 1	after Z 8244 (/5); text by Gramann (/5)	00202
168	1.	1725-07-29	Cantata Tue Rechnung! Donnerwort (Trinity IX)	B min.	satbSATB 2Oba Str Bc	33: 147	I/19: 87	after Z 4486 (/6); text by Franck, S., Ringwaldt (/6)	00203
168/6	1.	1725-07-29	chorale setting "Herr Jesu Christ, du höchstes Gut" (s. 8)	B min.	SATB	33: 166	III/2.2: 52	after Z 4486; text by Ringwaldt	11198
169	1.	1726-10-20	Cantata Gott soll allein mein Herze haben (Trinity XVIII)	D maj.	aSATB 2Oba Tai Str Org Bc	33: 167	I/24: 59	after Z 2029a (/7); text by Birkmann, Luther (/7); /1 & /5 ↔ BWV 1053/1 & /2	00204
169/7	1.	1726-10-20	chorale setting "Nun bitten wir den Heiligen Geist" (s. 3)	A maj.	SATB	33: 192	III/2.1: 30; III/2.2: 54	after Z 2029a; text by Luther	11196
170	1.	1726-07-28	Cantata Vergnügte Ruh, beliebte Seelenlust (Trinity VI)	D maj.	a Oba Fl Str Org Bc	33: 193	I/17.2: 61	text by Lehms	00205
171	1.	1729-01-01	Cantata Gott, wie dein Name, so ist auch dein Ruhm (New Year)	D maj.	satbSATB 3Tr Tmp 2Ob Str Bc	35: 1	I/4: 131	after BWV 205 (/4), 41/6 (/6); text by Picander, Hermann (/6)	00206
171/6	1.	1729-01-01	chorale setting "Jesu, nun sei gepreiset" (s. 2)	D maj.	SATB	35: 32	I/4: 131	after BWV 41/6; text by Hermann	11253
172.1	1.	1714-05-20	Cantata Erschallet, ihr Lieder, erklinget, ihr Saiten! (Pentecost; 1st version = Weimar version; incomplete)	C maj.	(SATB) 3Tr Tmp (Fl? Ob 2)Vl 2Va Vc Bas (Bc)		I/13	after Z 8359 (/6); text by Franck, S.?, Nicolai (/6), after Jh 14:23 (/2); → BWV 172.2	00207
172/6	1.	1714-05-20	chorale setting "Wie schön leuchtet der Morgenstern" (s. 4)	F maj.	SATB	35: 69	III/2.2: 187	after Z 8359; text by Nicolai	11314
172.2	1.	1724-05-28	Cantata Erschallet, ihr Lieder, erklinget, ihr Saiten! (Pentecost; 2nd version = 1st Leipzig version)	D maj.	satbSATB 3Tr Tmp Fl Ob Oba Bas 2Vl 2Va Vc Bc		I/13: 1	after BWV 172.1 (same text); → BWV 172.3	00208
172.3	1.	1731-05-13	Cantata Erschallet, ihr Lieder, erklinget, ihr Saiten! (Pentecost; 3rd version = 2nd Leipzig version)	C maj.	satbSATB 3Tr Tmp Ob Bas 2Vl 2Va Vc Org Bc	35: 35	I/13: 33	after BWV 172.2 (same text)	00209
173.2	1.	1727-06-02; 1731-05-14	Cantata Erhöhtes Fleisch und Blut (Pentecost 2)	D maj.	satbSATB 2Fl Str Bc	35: 71	I/14: 1	after BWV 173.1	00210
173.1	1.	1722-12-10	Secular cantata Durchlauchtster Leopold (birthday of Leopold of Anhalt-Köthen)	D maj.	satbSATB 2Fl Str Bc	34: 1	I/35: 95	→ BWV 173.2 (/1–/5, /8), 175/4 (/7)	00211
174	1.	1729-06-06	Cantata Ich liebe den Höchsten von ganzem Gemüte (Pentecost 2)	G maj.	atbSATB 2Cdc 2Ob Tai 3Vl 3Va 3Vc Str Bc	35: 103	I/14: 63	after BWV 1048/1 (/1), Z 8326 (/5); text by Picander, Schalling (/5)	00212
174/5	1.	1729-06-06	chorale setting "Herzlich lieb hab ich dich, o Herr" (s. 1)	D maj.	SATB	35: 157	III/2.1: 78; III/2.2: 32	after Z 8326; text by Schalling	11244
175	1.	1725-05-22	Cantata Er rufet seinen Schafen mit Namen (Pentecost 3)	G maj.	atbSATB 2Tr 3Fl Str Vc Bc	35: 159	I/14: 147	after BWV 173.1/7 (/4), BWV 59/3 (/7); text by Ziegler, C. M., Rist (/7), after Jh 10:3 & 6 (/1 & /5)	00213
175/7	1.	1725-05-22	chorale setting "O Gottes Geist, mein Trost und Rat" (s. 9)	G maj.	SATB	35: 177	III/2.1: 76	after Z 7445a; text by Rist	11243
175/7	1.	1725-05-22	chorale setting "Komm, Heiliger Geist, Herre Gott"	G maj.	SATB	35: 177	III/2.1: 76	after Z 7445a; text by Luther	11243
176	1.	1725-05-27	Cantata Es ist ein trotzig und verzagt Ding (Trinity)	C min.	sabSATB 2Ob Odc Str Bc	35: 179	I/15: 17	after Z 7246 (/6); text by Ziegler, C. M., Gerhardt (/6), after Jer 17:9 (/1)	00214
176/6	1.	1725-05-27	chorale setting "Was alle Weisheit in der Welt" (s. 8)	C min.	SATB	35: 198	III/2.2: 67	after Z 7246; text by Gerhardt	11296
176/6	1.	1725-05-27	chorale setting "Christ unser Herr zum Jordan kam"	C min.	SATB	35: 198	III/2.2: 67	after Z 7246; text by Luther	11296
177	1.	1732-07-06	Cantata Ich ruf zu dir, Herr Jesu Christ (Trinity IV)	G min.	satSATB 2Ob Odc Bas Vl Str Bc	35: 199	I/17.1: 77	after Z 7400; text by Agricola, J.	00215
177/5	1.	1732-07-06	chorale setting "Ich ruf zu dir, Herr Jesu Christ" (s. 5)	G min. E min	SATB	35: 234	III/2.1: 50; III/2.2: 40	after Z 7400; text by Agricola, J.	11211
178	1.	1724-07-30	Cantata Wo Gott der Herr nicht bei uns hält (Trinity VIII)	A min.	atbSATB Hn 2Ob 2Oba Str Bc	35: 235	I/18: 159	after Z 4441a; text after Jonas	00216
179	1.	1723-08-08	Cantata Siehe zu, daß deine Gottesfurcht nicht Heuchelei sei (Trinity XI)	G min.	stbSATB 2Ob 2Odc Str Bc	35: 273	I/20: 55	after Z 2778 (/6); text after JS 1:34 (/1), by Tietze (/6); /1 & /3 → BWV 236/1 & /5; /5 → 234/4	00217
179/6	1.	1723-08-08	chorale setting "Ich armer Mensch, ich armer Sünder" (s. 1)	A min.	SATB	35: 292	III/2.1: 55; III/2.2: 196	after Z 2778; text by Tietze	11218
179/6	1.	1723-08-08	chorale setting "Wer nur den lieben Gott lässt walten	A min.	SATB	35: 292	III/2.1: 55; III/2.2: 196	after Z 2778; text by Neumark	11218
180	1.	1724-10-22	Cantata Schmücke dich, o liebe Seele (Trinity XX)	F maj.	satbSATB 2Fl Fl Ob Odc Str Vc Bc	35: 293	I/25: 41	after Z 6923; text after Franck, J.	00218
180/7	1.	1724-10-22	chorale setting "Schmücke dich, o liebe Seele" (s. 9)	F maj. E♭ maj.	SATB	35: 322	III/2.1: 24; III/2.2: 15	after Z 6923; text by Franck, J.	11188
181	1.	1724-02-13	Cantata Leichtgesinnte Flattergeister (Sexagesima)	E min.	satbSATB Tr Fl Ob Str Bc	37: 1	I/7: 133		00219
182	1.	1714-03-25	Cantata Himmelskönig, sei willkommen (Palm Sunday)	B♭ maj.	atbSATB Fl (Ob 2)Vl 2Va Bc		I/8.2: 1	after 6288a–b (/7); text by Franck, S.?, Stockmann (/7), after Ps 40:8–9 (/3)	00220
182	1.	1724-03-25; 1728-03-21	Cantata Himmelskönig, sei willkommen (Palm Sunday)	G maj.	atbSATB Fl (Ob 2)Vl 2Va Bc	37: 21	I/8.2: 43	after 6288a–b (/7); text by Franck, S.?, Stockmann (/7), after Ps 40:8–9 (/3)	00220
183	1.	1725-05-13	Cantata Sie werden euch in den Bann tun (Exaudi)	A min.	satbSATB 2Oba 2Odc Str Vc Bc	37: 59	I/12: 187	after Z 5267 (/5); text by Ziegler, C. M., Gerhardt (/5), after Jh 16:2 (/1)	00221
183/5	1.	1725-05-13	chorale setting "Zeuch ein zu deinen Toren" (s. 5)	A min.	SATB	37: 74	III/2.2: 70	after Z 5267; text by Gerhardt	11325
183/5	1.	1725-05-13	chorale setting "Helft mir Gotts Güte preisen"	A min.	SATB	37: 74	III/2.2: 70	after Z 5267; text by Eber	11325
184.2	1.	1724-05-30; 1727-06-03; 1731-05-15	Cantata Erwünschtes Freudenlicht (Pentecost 3)	G maj.	satSATB 2Fl Str Bc	37: 75	I/14: 119	after BWV 184.1/1–/4 & /6, Z 5690 (/5); text by Wildenfels (/5)	00222
184.2/5	1.	1724-05-30; 1727-06-03; 1731-05-15	chorale setting "O Herre Gott, dein göttlich Wort" (s. 8)	D maj. G maj.	SATB	37: 95	III/2.1: 17; III/2.2: 10	after Z 5690; text by Wildenfels	11181
184.1	1.	1721-01-01	Secular cantata (incomplete)	G maj.	sb 2Fl Vl Str Bc (?)		I/35	→ BWV 184.2/1–/4, /6	00223
185.1	1.	1715-07-14	Cantata Barmherziges Herze der ewigen Liebe (Trinity IV)	F♯ min.	satbSATB Ob Str Bc	37: 101	I/17.1: 1	after Z 7400 (/6); text by Franck, S., Agricola, J. (/6); → BWV 185.2	00224
185/6	1.	1715-07-14	chorale setting "Ich ruf zu dir, Herr Jesu Christ" (s. 1)	F♯ min.	SATB	37: 118	III/2.1: 50	after Z 7400; text by Agricola, J.	11212
185.2	1.	1723-06-20	Cantata Barmherziges Herze der ewigen Liebe (Trinity IV)	G min.	satbSATB Tr Ob Str Bc	37: 101	I/17.1: 1	after BWV 185.1 (same text)	11368
186.2	1.	1723-07-11	Cantata Ärgre dich, o Seele, nicht (Trinity VII)	G min.	satbSATB 2Ob Tai Bas Str Bc	37: 119	I/18: 15	after BWV 186.1/1–/5 (/1, /3, /5, /8, /10), Z 4430 (/6, /11); text by Franck, S. (/1, /3, /5, /8, /10), Speratus (/6, /11)	00225
186.1	1.	1716-12-13	Cantata Ärgre dich, o Seele, nicht (Advent III; incomplete)		stbSATB 2Ob Odc Tai Bas Str Bc		I/1	text by Franck, S., Helmbold (/6); → BWV 186.2/1, /3, /5, /8, /10	00226
187	1.	1726-08-04	Cantata Es wartet alles auf dich (Trinity VII)	G min.	sabSATB 2Ob Str Bc	37: 155	I/18: 91	after Z 4816e (/7); text: Meiningen, after Ps 104:27–28 (/1), Mt 6:31–32 (/4), by Vogel (/7); /1, /3, /4, /5 → BWV 235/6, /4, /3, /5	00227
187/7	1.	1726-08-04	chorale setting "Singen wir aus Herzensgrund" (ss. 4, 6)	G min.	SATB	37: 191	III/2.2: 61	after Z 4816e; text by Vogel	11344
188	1.	1728-10-17	Cantata Ich habe meine Zuversicht (Trinity XXI)	D min.	satbSATB 2Ob Tai Str Org Bc	37: 193	I/25: 265	after Z 2164 (/6); text by Picander; /1 ↔ BWV 1052/3	00228
190.1	1.	1724-01-01	Cantata Singet dem Herrn ein neues Lied (New Year; incomplete)	D maj.	atbSATB 3Tr Tmp 3Ob Oba Bas Str Bc	37: 227	I/4: 1	after Z 8652 (/1–/2), 8477a (/7); text by Luther (/1–/2), Hermann (/7); → BWV 190.2/1, /2, /3, /5	00230
190/7	1.	1724-01-01	chorale setting "Jesu, nun sei gepreiset" (s. 2)	D maj.	SATB	37: 257	III/2.2: 189	after 8477a; text by Hermann (/7)	11306
190.2	1.	1730-06-25	Cantata Singet dem Herrn ein neues Lied (200th anniversary of the Augsb. Confess.; incomplete)		atbSATB 3Tr Tmp 3Ob Str Bc (?)		I/34	after BWV 190/1, /2, /3, /5; text by Picander, Luther (/1–/2, /7)	00231
191	1.	1743–1746	Cantata Gloria in excelsis Deo (Christmas)	D maj.	stSSATB 3Tr Tmp 2Fl 2Ob Str Bc	41: 1	I/2: 171	after BWV 232/4, /5, /8, /12; text: Lk 2:14, doxology	00232
192	1.	autumn 1730?	Cantata Nun danket alle Gott (incomplete)	G maj.	sbSATB 2Fl 2Ob Str Bc	41: 65	I/34: 107	after Z 5142; text by Rinkart	00233
193.2	1.	1727-08-25	Cantata Ihr Tore zu Zion (council election; incomplete)	D maj.	saSA(TB) 2Ob Str (Bc)	41: 91	I/32.1: 201	after BWV 193.1/1, /7, /9	00234
193.1	1.	1727-08-03	Secular cantata Ihr Häuser des Himmels, ihr scheinenden Lichter (name day of Friedrich August II; incomplete)		saSA(TB) 2Ob Str (Bc)		I/36	text by Picander; → BWV 193.2/1, /3, /5	00235
194.3	1.	1724-06-04; 1731-05-20	Cantata Höchsterwünschtes Freudenfest (Trinity; 1st Leipzig version)	B♭ maj.	stbSATB 3Ob Bas Str Bc	29: 99	I/31: 145	after BWV 194.2 (same text); → BWV 194.4	00236
194.4	1.	1726-06-16	Cantata Nun lasst uns Gott, dem Herren? (Trinity; 2nd Leipzig version)	B♭ maj.	stbSATB 3Ob Bas Str Bc	29: 99	I/31: 145, 235	after BWV 194.3/12, /2, /3, /4, /5, /7, /10	00237
194.2	1.	1723-11-02	Cantata Höchsterwünschtes Freudenfest (Störmthal version: consecration of church and organ)	B♭ maj.	sabSATB 3Ob Bas Str Bc	29: 99	I/31: 123	after BWV 194.1/1, /3, /5, /7, /9, Z 6543 (/6), 159 (/12); text by Heermann (/6), Gerhardt (/12); → BWV 194.3	00238
194.2/6	1.	1723-11-02	chorale setting "Treuer Gott, ich muß dir klagen" (ss. 6–7)	B♭ maj. G maj.	SATB	29: 124	III/2.1: 20; III/2.2: 35, 152	after Z 6543; text by Heermann	11184
194.2/6	1.	1723-11-02	chorale setting "Jesu, deine tiefen Wunden"	B♭ maj. G maj.	SATB	29: 124	III/2.1: 20; III/2.2: 35, 152	after Z 6543; text by Heermann	11184
194.2/6	1.	1723-11-02	chorale setting "Freu dich sehr, o meine Seele"	B♭ maj. G maj.	SATB	29: 124	III/2.1: 20; III/2.2: 35, 152	after Z 6543	11184
194.2/12	1.	1723-11-02	chorale setting "Wach auf, mein Herz, und singe" (ss. 9–10)	B♭ maj.	SATB	29: 138	III/2.1: 20; III/2.2: 52, 152	after Z 159; text by Gerhardt	11185
194.2/12	1.	1723-11-02	chorale setting "Nun lasst uns Gott dem Herren"	B♭ maj.	SATB	29: 138	III/2.1: 20; III/2.2: 52, 152	after Z 159; text by Helmbold	11185
194.1	1.	1717–1723?	Secular cantata model for church cantata versions of BWV 194 (incomplete)	B♭ maj.	3Ob Str &?		I/35	→ BWV 194.2/1, /3, /5, /8, /10	00239
195.3	1.	c.1748–1749	Cantata Dem Gerechten muß das Licht (wedding; last version)	D maj.	satbSATB 3Tr Tmp 2Hn 2Fl 2Ob 2Oba Str Bc	13^{1}: 1	I/33: 171	after BWV 195.2, Z 198 (/6); text after Ps 97:11–12 (/1), by Gerhardt (/6)	00242
195.1	1.	1727–1731	Cantata Dem Gerechten muß das Licht (wedding; 1st version, lost)		SATB 3Tr Tmp 2Fl 2Ob Str Bc		I/33	→ BWV 195.2	00240
195.2	1.	c. 1742	Cantata Dem Gerechten muß das Licht (wedding; 2nd version, incomplete)		SATB &?		I/33	after BWV 195.1, 30.1/5, /1 (/6, /8); text after Ps 97:11–12 (/1); → BWV 195.3	00241
196	1.	1708-06-05?	Cantata Der Herr denket an uns (wedding)	C maj.	stbSATB Str Bc	13^{1}: 71	I/33: 1	text after Ps. 115: 12–15	00243
197.2	1.	1736–1737	Cantata Gott ist unsre Zuversicht (wedding)	D maj.	sabSATB 3Tr Tmp 2Ob 2Oba Bas Str Bc	13^{1}: 95	I/33: 117	after Z 2029a (/5), 2778 (/10), BWV 197.1/4, /6 (/6, /8); text by Luther (/5)	00244
197.2/5	1.	1736–1737	chorale setting "Nun bitten wir den Heiligen Geist" (s. 3)	A maj.	SATB	13^{1}: 128	III/2.2: 46	after Z 2029a; text by Luther	11328
197.2/10	1.	1736–1737	chorale setting "Wer nur den lieben Gott lässt walten"	B min.	SATB	13^{1}: 144	III/2.2: 37	after Z 2778; text by Neumark	11313
197.1	1.	1728-12-25	Cantata Ehre sei Gott in der Höhe (Christmas; incomplete)	D maj.	abSATB 2Fl Oba Bas Str Vc Bc	41: 109	I/2: 63	after Z 5206b–c (/7); text by Picander, Ziegler, C. (/7; ↔ BWV 398), after Lk 2:14 (/1); /4 & /6 → BWV 197.2/6, /8	00245
197.1/7	1.	1728-12-25	chorale setting "Ich freue mich in dir" (s. 4)	D maj.	SATB	41: 114	III/2.2: 182	after Z 5206b–c; text by Ziegler, C.; ↔ BWV 398	11298
197.1/7	1.	1728-12-25	chorale setting "O Gott, du frommer Gott"	D maj.	SATB	41: 114	III/2.2: 182	after Z 5206b–c; text by Heermann; ↔ BWV 398	11298
198	1.	1727-10-17	Secular cantata Laß, Fürstin, laß noch einen Strahl a.k.a. Trauer-Ode (funeral ceremony for Christiane Eberhardine)	B min.	satbSATB 2Fl 2Ob 2Oba Str 2Vdg 2Lu Bc	13^{3}: 1; 44: 54	I/38: 179	text by Gottsched, J. C.; ↔ BWV 244a, 247	00246
199.2	1.	1720–1721	Cantata Mein Herze schwimmt im Blut (Trinity XI; Köthen version; incomplete)	D min.	s Ob Str Vdg Bc	41: 202	I/20: 48	after BWV 199.1 (same text); → 199.3	00247
199.3	1.	1723-08-08	Cantata Mein Herze schwimmt im Blut (Trinity XI; Leipzig version)	D min.	s Ob Str Vc Bc		I/20: 23	after BWV 199.2 (same text)	00248
199.1	1.	1714-08-12	Cantata Mein Herze schwimmt im Blut (Trinity XI; Weimar version)	C min.	s Ob Str Bc	NBG 13^{2}	I/20: 1	text by Lehms, Heermann (/6); → BWV 199.2	00249
200	1.	1742–1743 (JSB)	Aria Bekennen will ich seinen Namen	E maj.	a (2Vl) Bc		I/28.1: 189	after Stölzel; text after Lk 2:29–32	00250
201	1.	autumn 1729	Secular cantata Geschwinde, ihr wirbelnden Winde a.k.a. Der Streit zwischen Phoebus und Pan (dramma per musica)	D maj.	sattbb 3Tr Tmp 2Fl 2Ob Oba Str Bc	11^{2}: 1; 44: 85	I/40: 117	text by Picander; /7 → BWV 212/20	00251
202	1.	c.1718?	Secular cantata Weichet nur, betrübte Schatten (wedding)	G maj.	s Ob Str Bc	11^{2}: 73	I/40: 1	in D-LEb Peters Ms. R 8	00252
203	1.	c.1720?	Secular cantata Amore traditore	A min.	b Hc	11^{2}: 91	I/41: 31		00253
204	1.	1726–1727	Secular cantata Ich bin in mir vergnügt a.k.a. Von der Vergnügsamkeit	B♭ maj.	s Fl 2Ob Str Bc	11^{2}: 103	I/40: 79	text after Hunold	00254
205.1	1.	1725-08-03	Secular cantata Zerreißet, zersprenget, zertrümmert die Gruft a.k.a. Der zufriedengestellte Aeolus (dramma per musica for August Friedrich Müller)	D maj.	satbSATB 3Tr Tmp 2Hn 2Fl 2Ob Oba Str Va Vdg Bc	11^{2}: 137; 44: 39	I/38: 1	text by Picander; → BWV 205.2/1–/7, /9–/11, /13, /15, 171/4, 216/7	00255
205.2	1.	1734-02-19	Secular cantata Blast Lärmen, ihr Feinde (dramma per musica; music lost but largely reconstructable; coronation of Augustus III)		satbSATB 3Tr Tmp 2Hn 2Fl 2Ob Oba Str Va Vdg Bc		I/37	after BWV 205.1/1–/7, /9–/11, /13, /15; text by Picander?	00256
206.1	1.	1736-10-07 (1734?)	Secular cantata Schleicht, spielende Wellen (dramma per musica; 1st version: birthday of Augustus III)	D maj.	satbSATB 3Tr Tmp 3Fl 2Oba Str Bc	20^{2}: 1	I/36: 157	→ BWV 206.2	00257
206.2	1.	1740-08-03	Secular cantata Schleicht, spielende Wellen (dramma per musica; 2nd version: name day of Augustus III)	D maj.	satbSATB 3Tr Tmp 3Fl 2Ob 2Oba Str Bc		I/36: 157	after BWV 206.1	00258
207.1	1.	1726-12-11	Secular cantata Vereinigte Zwietracht der wechselnden Saiten (dramma per musica; appointment of professor Gottlieb Kortte)	D maj.	satbSATB 3Tr Tmp 2Fl 2Oba Tai Str Bc	20^{2}: 71	I/38: 97	after BWV 1046/3 (/1); → BWV 207.2/1, /3, /5, /7–/9	00259
207.2	1.	1735-08-03	Secular cantata Auf, schmetternde Töne der muntern Trompeten (dramma per musica; name day of Augustus III)	D maj.	satbSATB 3Tr Tmp 2Fl 2Oba Tai Str Bc	20^{2}: 139; 34: 345	I/37: 1	after BWV 207.1/1, /3, /5, /7–/9	00260
208.1	1.	1713-02-23	Secular cantata Was mir behagt, ist nur die muntre Jagd a.k.a. Hunting Cantata (1st version: birthday of Christian of Saxe-Weissenfels)	F maj.	sstb 2Hn 2Fl 2Ob Tai Bas Str Vc Bc (Vne)	29: 1	I/35: 1	text by Franck, S.; → BWV 208.2, 1040, 68/4, /2, 149/1	00261
1040	1.	1713-02-23	Trio (a.k.a. (Canonic) Trio Sonata; postlude to the Hunting Cantata?)	F maj.	Vl Ob Bc	29: 230	I/35: 1	after BWV 208.1/13; =BWV 208.1/13a	01222
208.2	1.	c.1715	Secular cantata Was mir behagt, ist nur die muntre Jagd a.k.a. Hunting Cantata (2nd version: for Ernst August I of Saxe-Weimar)	F maj.	sstb 2Hn 2Fl 2Ob Tai Bas Str Vc Bc (Vne)	29: 1	I/35: 1	after BWV 208.1 (near-identical text); → BWV 208.3	00262
208.3	1.	1742-08-03	Secular cantata Was mir behagt, ist nur die muntre Jagd (3rd version: name day of Augustus III)	F maj.	sstb 2Hn 2Fl 2Ob Tai Bas Str Vc Bc (Vne)?		I/37	after BWV 208.2; text after Franck, S.	00263
209	1.	1747?	Secular cantata Non sa che sia dolore (farewell of Lorenz Albrecht Beck?)	B min.	s Fl Str Bc	29: 43	I/41: 43	text after Metastasio	00264
210.2	1.	1741-09-19	Secular cantata O holder Tag, erwünschte Zeit (wedding)	A maj.	s Fl Oba Str Hc Vne	29: 67	I/40: 35	after BWV 210.1/1–/2, /4, /8, /10	00265
210.1	1.	1729-01-12	Secular cantata O angenehme Melodei (incomplete; homage to Christian of Saxe-Weissenfels)	A maj.	s (Fl Oba Str Bc)?	29: 245	I/39: 141	→ BWV 210.2/1–/2, /4, /8, /10	00266
211	1.	c.1734	Secular cantata Schweigt stille, plaudert nicht a.k.a. Coffee Cantata	G maj.	stb Fl Str Hc Bc	29: 139; 44: 86	I/40: 193	text by Picander	00267
212	1.	1742-08-30	Secular cantata Mer hahn en neue Oberkeet a.k.a. Peasant Cantata (Cantate burlesque; homage to Carl Heinrich von Dieskau)	G maj.	sb Hn Fl Str Bc	29: 173; 44: 132	I/39: 151	after BWV 1157/9 (/14), 201/7 (/20); text by Picander	00268
213	1.	1733-09-05	Secular cantata Laßt uns sorgen, laßt uns wachen a.k.a. Hercules auf dem Scheidewege (dramma per musica; birthday of Frederick Christian of Saxony)	F maj.	satbSATB 2Hn 2Ob Oba 2Vl 2Va Bc	34: 119	I/36: 1	text by Picander; /1, /3, /5, /7, /9, /11 → BWV 248/36, /19, /39, /41, /4, /29	00269
214	1.	1733-12-08	Secular cantata Tönet, ihr Pauken! Erschallet, Trompeten! (birthday of queen Maria Josepha)	D maj.	satbSATB 3Tr Tmp 2Fl 2Ob Oba Str Vne Bc	34: 175	I/36: 89	text by Picander; /1, /5, /7, /9 → BWV 248/1, /15, /8, /24	00270
215	1.	1734-10-05	Secular cantata Preise dein Glücke, gesegnetes Sachsen (anniversary of the election of Augustus III as king of Poland)	D maj.	stb2SATB 3Tr Tmp 2Fl 2Ob Oba Str Va Bc	34: 243	I/37: 85	after BWV 1157/1 (/1)?; text by Clauder; /7 → BWV 248/47	00271
216.1	1.	1728-02-05	Secular cantata Vergnügte Pleißenstadt (wedding; incomplete)	C maj.	sa &?		I/40: 21	after BWV 204/8 (/3), 205.1/13 (/7); text by Picander; → BWV 216.2/1, /3, /5, /7	00272
216.2	1.	1728–1731	Secular cantata Erwählte Pleißenstadt a.k.a. Apollo et Mercurius (incomplete)		at &?		I/39	after BWV 216.1/1, /3, /5, /7; text by Meißner after Picander	00273
**2.**	Motets (see also: List of motets by Johann Sebastian Bach)								Up ↑
225	2.	1726–1727; New Year?	Motet Singet dem Herrn ein neues Lied	B♭ maj.	2SATB (+colla parte instr.?)	39: 3	III/1: 1	after Z 8244 (/2); text after Ps. 149: 1–3 (/1), by Gramann after Ps. 103 (/2), after Ps. 150: 2, 6 (/3)	00282
226	2.	1729-10-20	Motet Der Geist hilft unser Schwachheit auf (funeral of Ernesti, J. H.)	B♭ maj.	2SATB Str Vc 2Ob Tai Bas	39: 39, 143	III/1: 37	after Z 7445a (/2); text after Rom. 8: 26–27 (/1), by Luther (/2)	00283
226/2	2.	1729-10-20	chorale setting "Komm, Heiliger Geist, Herre Gott" (s. 3)	B♭ maj. G maj.	SATB	39: 57	III/2.1: 18; III/2.2: 38	after Z 7445a; text by Luther	11182
227	2.	c. 1723–1735	Motet Jesu, meine Freude	E min.	SSATB (+colla parte instr.?)	39: 59	III/1: 75	after Z 8032 (odd mvts); text by Franck, J. (odd mvts), after Rom. 8: 1–2, 9–11 (even mvts)	00284
227/1; 227/11	2.	c. 1723–1735	chorale setting "Jesu, meine Freude" (ss. 1, 6)	E min.	SATB	39: 61	III/2.1: 27; III/2.2: 156	after Z 8032; text by Franck, J.	11200
227/3	2.	c. 1723–1735	chorale setting "Jesu, meine Freude" (s. 2)	E min.	SATB	39: 66	III/2.1: 28	after Z 8032; text by Franck, J.	11201
227/7	2.	c. 1723–1735	chorale setting "Jesu, meine Freude" (s. 4)	E min.	SATB	39: 75	III/2.1: 22; III/2.2: 168	after Z 8032; text by Franck, J.	11202
228	2.	c. 1715	Motet Fürchte dich nicht	A maj.	2SATB (+colla parte instr.?)	39: 85	III/1: 105	after Z 6461 (/2); text after Is. 41: 10 (/1), 43: 1 (/2), by Gerhardt (/2)	00285
229	2.	before 1731–1732	Motet Komm, Jesu, komm	G min.	2SATB (+colla parte instr.)	39: 107	III/1: 125	text by Thymich	00286
230	2.	1723–1739?	Motet Lobet den Herrn, alle Heiden	C maj.	SATB Bc (+colla parte instr.?)	39: 127	III/1: 147	text after Ps. 117	00287
231								see BWV 28/2a	00288
118.1	2.	1736–1737	Motet O Jesu Christ, meins Lebens Licht (funeral)	B♭ maj.	SATB 2Hn Cnt 3Tbn	24: 185	III/1: 163	text by Behm; → BWV 118.2	00143
118.2	2.	1746–1747	Motet O Jesu Christ, meins Lebens Licht (funeral)	B♭ maj.	SATB 2Ob Tai Bas 2Hn Str Bc	NBG 17^{1}	III/1: 171	text by Behm; after BWV 118.1	11121
**3.**	Masses, Mass movements, Magnificat (see also: List of Masses, Mass movements and Magnificats by Johann Sebastian Bach)								Up ↑
232	3.	Aug. 1748 – Oct. 1749 (compilation, completion)	Mass a.k.a. Hohe Messe, Mass in B minor	B min.	ssatbSSAATB 3Tr Tmp Hn 2Fl 3Ob 2Oba 2Bas Vl Str Bc	6	II/1 rev 1	after BWV 232^{I} e. v., ^{II} e. v., ^{III} e. v., 171/1, 12/2, 120/2, Anh. 11/1, Anh. 196/3; text after Ordinarium Missae	00289
232^{I} e. v.	3.	1733-07-27	Kyrie–Gloria Mass for the Dresden court (Mass in B Minor, Part I: Missa; early version)	B min.	ssatbSSATB 3Tr Tmp Hn 2Fl 2Oba 2Bas Vl Str Bc		II/1a	after BWV 29/1, 46/1; text from Ordinarium Missae; → BWV 191, 232^{I}	00290
233	3.	1738–1739?	Kyrie–Gloria Mass	F maj.	sabSATB 2Hn 2Ob Bas Str Bc	8: 1	II/2: 197	after BWV 233a, 102/3, /5, 40/1; text from Ordinarium Missae	00291
233a	3.	1708-04-06?	Kyrie "Christe, du Lamm Gottes"	F maj.	SSATB Bc	41: 187	II/2: 285	text after Ordinarium Missae; → BWV 233/1	00292
234	3.	c.1738	Kyrie–Gloria Mass	A maj.	sabSATB 2Fl Str Bc	8: 51	II/2: 1	after BWV 67/6, 138/5, 179/5, 79/2; text from Ordinarium Missae	00293
235	3.	1738–1739?	Kyrie–Gloria Mass	G min.	atbSATB 2Ob Str Bc	8: 99	II/2: 127	after BWV 102/1, 72/1, 187/4, /3, /5, /1; text from Ordinarium Missae	00294
236	3.	1738–1739?	Kyrie–Gloria Mass	G maj.	satbSATB 2Ob Str Bc	8: 155	II/2: 61	after BWV 179/1, /3, 79/1, /5, 138/5, 17/1; text from Ordinarium Missae	00295
1081	3.	c.1747 – Aug. 1748	Credo intonation for Mass No. 5 in F major of G. B. Bassani's Acroama Missale	F maj.	SATB Bc		II/2	→ BNB I/B/48; text from Credo	01267
237	3.	1723-06-24?	Sanctus	C maj.	SATB 3Tr Tmp 2Ob Str Bc	11^{1}: 67	II/2: 311	text from Sanctus	00296
238	3.	1723-12-25; 1736–1737	Sanctus	D maj.	SATB Cnt Str Bc	11^{1}: 79	II/2: 325	text from Sanctus	00297
240	3.	1742 (JSB)	Sanctus	G maj.	SATB 2Ob Str Bc	11^{1}: 93	II/9: 3	text from Sanctus	00299
241	3.	Jul. 1747 – Aug. 1748 (JSB)	Sanctus of Missa superba	D maj.	2SATB 2Oba 2Vl 3Va Bas Vc Vne Bc	41: 177	II/9: 45	after Kerll; text from Sanctus	00300
242	3.	1727–1732 (JSB)	Christe eleison for a Kyrie-Gloria Mass in C minor by F. Durante	G min.	SA Bc	41: 197	II/2: 295	text from Kyrie; → BWV Anh. 26/2	00301
243.2	3.	1733-07-02? 1732–1735	Magnificat (2nd version: Visitation?)	D maj.	ssatbSSATB 3Tr Tmp 2Fl 2Ob 2Oba Str Bas Vc Vne Bc	11^{1}: 1	II/3: 65	after BWV 243.1 (same text)	00302
243.1	3.	1723-07-02; 1723-12-25	Magnificat (1st version:Visitation, and with 4 laudes added: Christmas)	E♭ maj.	ssatbSSATB 3Tr Tmp 2Fl 2Ob Str Bc	11^{1}: 103	II/3: 1	after Magnificat peregrini toni (/10); text: Magnificat; → BWV 243.2	00303
1082	3.	1740–1742 (JSB)	Suscepit Israel from a Magnificat by A. Caldara	E min.	SATB 2Vl Bc		II/9: 59	after Caldara (BNB I/C/1); text from Magnificat	01268
1083	3.	1745–1747 (JSB)	Cantata Tilge, Höchster, meine Sünden		sa 2Vl Str Vne Vc Bc		I/41: 169	after Pergolesi (Stabat Mater); text after Ps. 51	01269
**4.**	Passions, Oratorios (see also: List of Passions and Oratorios by Johann Sebastian Bach)								Up ↑
244.2	4.	1736-03-30; 1742; 1743–1746	Passion St Matthew Passion (later versions; Good Friday)	E min.	2satb2SATB 2Fl 4Fl 4Ob 4Oba 2Odc 2Str 2Vdg 2Bc	4; 44: 58	II/5	after BWV 244.1, 245.2 (/29); text by Picander, Decius (/1), Heermann (/3, /19, /46), Gerhardt (/10, /15, /17, /37, /44, /54, /62), Albert of Prussia (/25), Heyden (/29), Reusner (/32), Rist (/40), after Mt 26–27, Sng 6:1 (/30)	00304
244a								see BWV 1143	00305
244.1	4.	1727-04-11	Passion St Matthew Passion (early version; Good Friday)	E min.	satb2SATB 4Fl 4Ob 4Oba 2Odc 2Str Lu Bc		II/5a; II/5b	after Z 4361a (/1), 983 (/3, /19, /46), 2293b (/10, /37), 5385a (/15, /17, /44, /54, /62), 7568 (/25), 3449 (/29), 2461c (/32), 6551 (/40); text by Picander, Heermann (/3, /19, /46), Gerhardt (/10, /15, /17, /37, /44, /54, /62), Albert of Prussia (/25), Keymann (/29), Reusner (/32), Rist (/40), after Mt 26–27, Sng 6:1 (/30); ↔ BWV 198, 1143; → BWV 244.2	00306
244/3	4.	1727-04-11	chorale setting "Herzliebster Jesu" (s. 1)	B min.	SATB	4: 23	III/2.2: 43	after Z 983; text by Heermann	11349
244/10	4.	1727-04-11	chorale setting "O Welt, sieh hier dein Leben" (s. 5)	A♭ maj.	SATB	4: 42	III/2.2: 66	after Z 2293b; text by Gerhardt	11351
244/10	4.	1727-04-11	chorale setting "Nun ruhen alle Wälder"	A♭ maj.	SATB	4: 42	III/2.2: 66	after Z 2293b; text by Gerhardt	11351
244/15	4.	1727-04-11	chorale setting "O Haupt voll Blut und Wunden" (s. 5)	E maj. D maj.	SATB	4: 51	III/2.2: 55	after Z 5385a; text by Gerhardt	11358
244/17	4.	1727-04-11	chorale setting "O Haupt voll Blut und Wunden" (s. 6; in BWV 244.1: s. 7?)	E♭ maj. D maj.	SATB	4: 53	III/2.2: 55	after Z 5385a; text by Gerhardt	11358
244/25	4.	1727-04-11	chorale setting "Was mein Gott will, das gscheh allzeit" (s. 1)	B min.	SATB	4: 83	III/2.2: 64	after Z 7568; text by Albert of Prussia	11353
244/32	4.	1727-04-11	chorale setting "In dich hab ich gehoffet, Herr" (s. 5)	B♭ maj.	SATB	4: 151	III/2.2: 66	after Z 2461c; text by Reusner	11354
244/37	4.	1727-04-11	chorale setting "O Welt, sieh hier dein Leben" (s. 3)	F maj.	SATB	4: 164	III/2.2: 29	after Z 2293b; text by Gerhardt	11352
244/37	4.	1727-04-11	chorale setting "In allen meinen Taten"	F maj.	SATB	4: 164	III/2.2: 29	after Z 2293b; text by Fleming	11352
244/40	4.	1727-04-11	chorale setting "Werde munter, mein Gemüte" (s. 6)	A maj.	SATB	4: 173	III/2.1: 95; III/2.2: 68	after Z 6551; text by Rist	11254
244/40	4.	1727-04-11	chorale setting "Jesu, meiner Seelen Wonne"	A maj.	SATB	4: 173	III/2.1: 95; III/2.2: 68	after Z 6551; text by Janus	11254
244/44	4.	1727-04-11	chorale setting "Befiehl du deine Wege" (s. 1)	D maj.	SATB	4: 186	III/2.2: 49	after Z 5385a; text by Gerhardt	11355
244/44	4.	1727-04-11	chorale setting "O Haupt voll Blut und Wunden"	D maj.	SATB	4: 186	III/2.2: 49	after Z 5385a; text by Gerhardt	11355
244/46	4.	1727-04-11	chorale setting "Herzliebster Jesu" (s. 4)	B min.	SATB	4: 192	III/2.2: 59	after Z 983; text by Heermann	11350
244/54	4.	1727-04-11	chorale setting "O Haupt voll Blut und Wunden" (ss. 1–2)	F maj.	SATB	4: 214	III/2.2: 41	after Z 5385a; text by Gerhardt	11356
244/62	4.	1727-04-11	chorale setting "O Haupt voll Blut und Wunden" (s. 9)	A min. B min.	SATB	4: 248	III/2.2: 50	after Z 5385a; text by Gerhardt	11357
245.1	4.	1724-04-07	Passion St John Passion (1st version; Good Friday)	G min.	satbSATB (2Fl?) 2Ob 2Odc Str 2Va Vdg Lu Bc	12^{1} 44: 26	II/4: 40	after Z 983 (/3, /17), 2561 (/5), 2293b (/11), 6288a–b (/14, /28, /32), 6283b (/15, /37), 2383 (/22), 5404a (/26), 8326 (/40); text after Jh 18–19, Mt 26:75 (/12), Mk 15:38 (/33), by Heermann (/3, /17), Luther (/5), Brockes (/7, /19, /20, /24, /32, /34, /35, /39), Gerhardt (/11), Weise (/13), Stockmann (/14, /28, /32), Weiße (/15, /37), Postel (/19, /22, /30), Herberger (/26), Schalling (/40); → BWV 245.2–5	00307
245.1/3	4.	1724-04-07	chorale setting "Herzliebster Jesu" (s. 7)	G min.	SATB		III/2.1: 93	after Z 983; text by Heermann	11255
245/3	4.	c. 1740	chorale setting "Herzliebster Jesu" (s. 7)	G min.	SATB	12^{1}: 17	III/2.2: 33	after Z 983; text by Heermann	11255
245.1/5	4.	1724-04-07	chorale setting "Vater unser im Himmelreich" (s. 4)	D min.	SATB		III/2.1: 94; III/2.2: 27	after Z 2561; text by Luther after Mt 6:9–13; ↔ BWV 416	11256
245/5	4.	c. 1740	chorale setting "Vater unser im Himmelreich" (s. 4)	D min.	SATB	12^{1}: 18		after Z 2561; text by Luther after Mt 6:9–13	11256
245/11	4.	1724-04-07	chorale setting "O Welt, sieh hier dein Leben" (ss. 3–4)	A maj.	SATB	12^{1}: 31	III/2.1: 94; III/2.2: 35	after Z 2293b; text by Gerhardt; → BWV 395	11257
245/11	4.	1724-04-07	chorale setting "Nun ruhen alle Wälder"	A maj.	SATB	12^{1}: 31	III/2.1: 94; III/2.2: 35	after Z 2293b; text by Gerhardt; → BWV 395	11257
245/14	4.	1724-04-07	chorale setting "Jesu Leiden, Pein und Tod" (s. 10)	A maj.	SATB	12^{1}: 39	III/2.2: 46	after Z 6288a–b; text by Stockmann	11273
245/15	4.	1724-04-07	chorale setting "Christus, der uns selig macht" (s. 1)	A min.	SATB	12^{1}: 43	III/2.2: 44	after Z 6283b; text by Weiße after "Patris sapientia"	11274
245/17	4.	1724-04-07	chorale setting "Herzliebster Jesu" (ss. 8–9)	A min.	SATB	12^{1}: 52	III/2.1: 95; III/2.2: 62	after Z 983; text by Heermann	11258
245/22	4.	1724-04-07	chorale setting "Durch dein Gefängnis Gottes Sohn"	E maj.	SATB	12^{1}: 74	III/2.2: 181	after Z 2383; text by Postel	11275
245/22	4.	1724-04-07	chorale setting "Machs mit mir, Gott, nach deiner Güt"	E maj.	SATB	12^{1}: 74	III/2.2: 181	after Z 2383; text by Schein	11275
245/26	4.	1724-04-07	chorale setting "Valet will ich dir geben" (s. 3)	E♭ maj.	SATB	12^{1}: 95	III/2.1: 96; III/2.2: 60	after Z 5404a; text by Herberger	11259
245/28	4.	1724-04-07	chorale setting "Jesu Leiden, Pein und Tod" (s. 20)	A maj.	SATB	12^{1}: 103	III/2.2: 59	after Z 6288a–b; text by Stockmann	11276
245/37	4.	1724-04-07	chorale setting "Christus, der uns selig macht" (s. 8)	B♭ min.	SATB	12^{1}: 121	III/2.2: 63	after Z 6283b; text by Weiße after "Patris sapientia"	11277
245/40	4.	1724-04-07	chorale setting "Herzlich lieb hab ich dich, o Herr" (s. 3)	E♭ maj.	SATB	12^{1}: 131	III/2.2: 60	after Z 8326; text by Schalling	11278
245.2	4.	1725-03-30	Passion St John Passion (2nd version; Good Friday)	E♭ maj.	satbSATB 2Fl 2Ob 2Odc Str Vdg Bc	12^{1}	II/4: 167	after Z 8303 (/1), BWV 245.1, 23/4 (/40); text by Heyden (/1), Heermann (/3, /17), Luther (/5, /40), Brockes (/7, /24, /32, /34, /35, /39), Gerhardt (/11), Birkmann (a, b, c) Stockmann (a, /14, /28, /32), Weiße (/15, /37), Postel (/22, /30), Herberger (/26), after Jh 18–19, Mt 26:75 (/12), Mt 27:51 (/33); → BWV 245.3; /1 → BWV 244.2/29,	00308
245.3	4.	1730-04-07	Passion St John Passion (3rd version; Good Friday)		satbSATB 2Fl 2Ob Str Vdg Org Bc	12^{1} 44: 26	II/4: 206	after BWV 245.1–.2; text after Jh 18–19, by Heermann (/3, /17), Luther (/5), Brockes (/7, /19, /20, /24, /32, /39), Gerhardt (/11), Stockmann (/14, /28, /32), Weiße (/15, /37), Postel (/19, /22, /30), Herberger (/26); → BWV 245.4–5	00309
245.4	4.	1739	Passion St John Passion (incomplete revision)		satbSATB Fl 2Ob Str Bc	12^{1} 44: 26	II/4	after BWV 245.1–.3; text by Heyden (/1), Heermann (/3), Luther (/5), after Jh 18; → BWV 245.5	11076
245.5	4.	1749-04-04	Passion St John Passion (4th version; Good Friday)		satbSATB 2Fl 2Ob 2Oba Odc Bas Str Vdg Hc Bc	12^{1} 44: 26	II/4	after BWV 245.1–4; text after Jh 18–19, Mt 26:75 (/12), Mt 27:51 (/33), by Heermann (/3, /17), Luther (/5), Brockes (/7, /19, /24, /32, /34, /35, /39), Gerhardt (/11), Weise (/13), Stockmann (/14, /28, /32), Weiße (/15, /37), Postel (/19, /22, /30), Herberger (/26), Schalling (/40)	00310
246/40a	4.	1743–1745 (JSB)	Chorale Aus der Tiefen rufe ich, No. 40 of St Luke Passion		t Str Bc (?)		II/9: 65	after BWV 246/40	00312
247	4.	1731-03-23; 1744-04-03	Passion St Mark Passion (Good Friday; music lost but in part reconstructable)		satbSATB 2Fl 2Ob 2Oba 2Vl 2Va (2Vdg 2Lu) Org Bc (?)		II/5	text by Picander, Jonas, Reusner, Gerhardt, Rist, Kritzelmann, Schein, Stockmann, Franck, J., Homburg, Luther, Spee; after BWV 198/1, /5, /3, /8, /10 (or 244a/7), 54/1, 248/28?, /45, 7/2?	00313
1088	4.	c.1750?	Arioso So heb ich denn mein Auge sehnlich auf, No. 20 in Passion Oratorio Wer ist der, so von Edom kömmt (Good Friday)		b 2Bas Bc (?)		I/41: 125		01274
248	4.	1734-12-25 – 1735-01-06	Oratorio Christmas Oratorio (Christmastide)	D maj.	satbSATB 3Tr 2Hn Tmp 2Fl 2Ob 2Oba 2Odc Str Bc	5^{1} 44: 125	II/6	after BWV 214 (/1, /8, /15, /24), 213 (/4, /19, /29, /36, /39, /41), 215 (/47), 248^{VI}a (/54, /56–/57, /61–/64), Z 5385a (/5, /64), 1947 (/7, /28), 346 (/9, /17, /23), 5741b (/12), 6462 (/33), 2072 (/35), 2461c (/46), 3614b (/53), 4429a (/59); text by Picander?, Gerhardt (/5, /17, /23, /33, /59), Luther (/7, /9, /28), Rist (/12, /38, /40, /42), Runge (/35), Weissel (/46), Franck, J. (/53), Werner (/64), after Lk 2:1–21, Mt 2:1–12	00314
248^{I}	4.	1734-12-25	Cantata Jauchzet, frohlocket, auf, preiset die Tage (Christmas Oratorio, Part I; Christmas)	D maj.	satbSATB 3Tr Tmp 2Fl 2Ob 2Oba Str Bc	5^{1}: 2; 44: 125	II/6: 1	after BWV 214/1 & /7 (/1 & /8), 213/9 (/4), Z 5385a (/5), 1947 (/7), 346 (/9); text by Picander?, Gerhardt (/5), Luther (/7, /9), after Lk 2:1, 3–7	11385
248/5	4.	1734-12-25	chorale setting "Wie soll ich dich empfangen" (s. 1)	A min.	SATB	5^{1}: 36	III/2.2: 199	after Z 5385a; text by Gerhardt	11279
248/5	4.	1734-12-25	chorale setting "O Haupt voll Blut und Wunden"	A min.	SATB	5^{1}: 36	III/2.2: 199	after Z 5385a; text by Gerhardt	11279
248/9	4.	1734-12-25	chorale setting "Vom Himmel hoch da komm ich her" (s. 13)	D maj.	SATB	5^{1}: 47	III/2.2: 26	after Z 346; text by Luther	11280
248^{II}	4.	1734-12-26	Cantata Und es waren Hirten in derselben Gegend (Christmas Oratorio, Part II; Christmas 2)	G maj.	satbSATB 2Fl 2Oba 2Odc Str Bc	5^{1}: 50; 44: 126	II/6: 55	after Z 5741b (/3), 346 (/8, /14), BWV 214/5 (/6), 213/3 (/10); text by Picander?, Rist (/3), Gerhardt (/8, /14), after Lk 2: 8–14	11386
248/12	4.	1734-12-26	chorale setting "Ermuntre dich, mein schwacher Geist" (s. 9)	G maj.	SATB	5^{1}: 59	III/2.1: 83, 92; III/2.2: 7, 207	after Z 5741b; text by Rist	11260
248/12	4.	1734-12-26	chorale setting "Du Lebensfürst, Herr Jesu Christ"	G maj.	SATB	5^{1}: 59	III/2.1: 83, 92; III/2.2: 7, 207	after Z 5741b; text by Rist	11260
248/17	4.	1734-12-26	chorale setting "Schaut, schaut, was ist für Wunder dar" (s. 8)	C maj.	SATB	5^{1}: 66	III/2.1: 84	after Z 346; text by Gerhardt	11261
248/17	4.	1734-12-26	chorale setting "Vom Himmel hoch da komm ich her"	C maj.	SATB	5^{1}: 66	III/2.1: 84	after Z 346; text by Luther	11261
248/23	4.	1734-12-26	chorale setting "Wir singen dir, Immanuel" (s. 2)	G maj.	SATB	5^{1}: 90	III/2.2: 198	after Z 346; text by Gerhardt	11281
248/23	4.	1734-12-26	chorale setting "Vom Himmel hoch da komm ich her"	G maj.	SATB	5^{1}: 90	III/2.2: 198	after Z 346; text by Luther	11281
248^{III}	4.	1734-12-27	Cantata Herrscher des Himmels, erhöre das Lallen (Christmas Oratorio, Part III; Christmas 3)	D maj.	satbSATB 3Tr Tmp 2Fl 2Ob 2Oba Str Bc	5^{1}: 94	II/6: 107	after BWV 214/9 (/1=/13), 213/11 (/6), Z 1947 (/5), 6462 (/10), 2072 (/12); text by Picander?, Luther (/5), Gerhardt (/10), Runge (/12), after Lk 2: 15–20	11387
248/28	4.	1734-12-27	chorale setting "Gelobet seist du, Jesu Christ" (s. 7)	D maj.	SATB	5^{1}: 110	III/2.1: 85	after Z 1947; text by Luther	11262
248/33	4.	1734-12-27	chorale setting "Fröhlich soll mein Herze springen" (s. 15)	G maj.	SATB	5^{1}: 124	III/2.1: 86; III/2.2: 81	after Z 6462; text by Gerhardt	11264
248/33	4.	1734-12-27	chorale setting "Warum sollt ich mich denn grämen"	G maj.	SATB	5^{1}: 124	III/2.1: 86; III/2.2: 81	after Z 6462; text by Gerhardt	11264
248/35	4.	1734-12-27	chorale setting "Laßt Furcht und Pein" (s. 4)	F♯ min.	SATB	5^{1}: 126	III/2.1: 86; III/2.2: 206	after Z 2072; text by Runge	11263
248/35	4.	1734-12-27	chorale setting "Wir Christenleut"	F♯ min.	SATB	5^{1}: 126	III/2.1: 86; III/2.2: 206	after Z 2072; text by Füger	11263
248^{IV}	4.	1735-01-01	Cantata Fallt mit Danken, fallt mit Loben (Christmas Oratorio, Part IV; New Year)	F maj.	satbSATB 2Hn 2Ob Str Bc	5^{1}: 128	II/6: 143	after BWV 213/1, /5, /7 (/1, /4, /6); text by Picander?, Rist (/3, /5, /7), after Lk 2: 21	11388
248/42	4.	1735-01-01	chorale setting "Hilf, Herr Jesu, laß gelingen" (s. 15)	F maj.	SATB	5^{1}: 166	III/2.1: 99; III/2.2: 211	text by Rist	11266
248/42	4.	1735-01-01	chorale setting "Jesu, meiner Seelen Wonne"	F maj.	SATB	5^{1}: 166	III/2.1: 99; III/2.2: 211	text by Janus	11266
248^{V}	4.	1735-01-02	Cantata Ehre sei dir, Gott, gesungen (Christmas Oratorio, Part V; New Year I)	A maj.	satbSATB 2Oba Str Bc	5^{1}: 172	II/6: 199	after BWV 247/39b (/3), 215/7 (/5), Z 2461c (/4), 3614b (/11); text by Picander?, Weissel (/4), Franck, J. (/11), after Mt 2:1–6	11389
248/46	4.	1735-01-02	chorale setting "Nun, liebe Seel, nun ist es Zeit" (s. 5)	A maj.	SATB	5^{1}: 190	III/2.1: 87; III/2.2: 43	after Z 2461c; text by Weissel	11265
248/46	4.	1735-01-02	chorale setting "In dich hab ich gehoffet, Herr"	A maj.	SATB	5^{1}: 190	III/2.1: 87; III/2.2: 43	after Z 2461c; text by Reusner	11265
248/53	4.	1735-01-02	chorale setting "Ihr Gestirn, ihr hohlen Lüfte" (s. 9)	A maj.	SATB	5^{1}: 208	III/2.1: 100; III/2.2: 21	after Z 3614b; text by Franck, J.	11267
248/53	4.	1735-01-02	chorale setting "Gott des Himmels und der Erden"	A maj.	SATB	5^{1}: 208	III/2.1: 100; III/2.2: 21	after Z 3614b; text by Albert	11267
248^{VI}	4.	1735-01-06	Cantata Herr, wenn die stolzen Feinde schnauben (Christmas Oratorio, Part VI; Epiphany)	D maj.	satbSATB 3Tr Tmp 2Ob 2Oba Str Bc	5^{1}: 210	II/6: 243	after BWV 248^{VI}a (/1, /3, /4, /8–/11), Z 4429a (/6), 5385a (/11); text by Picander?, Gerhardt (/6), Werner (/11), after Mt 2:7–12	11390
248/59	4.	1735-01-06	chorale setting "Ich steh an deiner Krippen hier" (s. 1)	G maj.	SATB	5^{1}: 245	III/2.1: 84; III/2.2: 208	after 4429a; text by Gerhardt	11268
248/59	4.	1735-01-06	chorale setting "Es ist gewisslich an der Zeit"	G maj.	SATB	5^{1}: 245	III/2.1: 84; III/2.2: 208	after 4429a; text by Ringwaldt	11268
248/64	4.	1735-01-06	chorale setting "Ihr Christen auserkoren" (s. 4)	D maj.	SATB	5^{1}: 256	III/2.1: 85	after 5385a; text by Werner	11269
248/64	4.	1735-01-06	chorale setting "Ach Herr, mich armen Sünder"	D maj.	SATB	5^{1}: 256	III/2.1: 85	after 5385a; text by Schneegaß	11269
248^{VI}a	4.	1734 or earlier	Cantata model for BWV 248^{VI}	D maj.	satbSATB 3Tr Tmp 2Ob 2Oba Str Bc		II/6	after BWV Anh. 10/1; → 248/54, /56–/57, /61–/64	00315
249.5	4.	1743–1746; 1749-04-06; 1750-03-26	Oratorio Kommt, eilet und laufet (Easter Oratorio; Easter)		satbSATB 3Tr Tmp Fl 2Fl 2Ob Oba Str Bc	21^{3}	II/7: 1	after BWV 249.4; text by Picander?	00316
249.4	4.	c. 1738	Oratorio Kommt, eilet und laufet (Easter Oratorio, middle version; Easter)		satbSATB 3Tr Tmp Fl 2Fl 2Ob Oba Str Bc		II/7	after BWV 249.3; text by Picander?; → BWV 249.5	11392
249.3	4.	1725-04-01 c.1738	Cantata Kommt, fliehet und eilet (Easter Oratorio, early versions: first version as cantata; Easter)		satbSATB 3Tr Tmp Fl 2Fl 2Ob Oba Vl Str Bc		II/7: 97	after BWV 249.1; text by Picander?; → BWV 249.4	00317
249.1	4.	1725-02-23	Secular cantata Entfliehet, verschwindet, entweichet, ihr Sorgen, a.k.a. Shepherd Cantata (birthday of Christian of Saxe-Weissenfels; music lost but in part reconstructable)		satbSATB 3Tr Tmp Fl 2Fl 2Ob Str Bc		I/35	text by Picander; → BWV 249.3/1–/3, /5, /7, /9, /11; 249.2	00318
249.2	4.	1726-08-25	Secular cantata Verjaget, zerstreuet, zerrüttet, ihr Sterne a.k.a. Die Feier des Genius (dramma per musica; birthday of Joachim Friedrich von Flemming; music lost but in part reconstructable)				I/39	after BWV 249.1/1–/3, /5, /7, /9, /11; text by Picander	00319
11	4.	1738-05-15	Oratorio Lobet Gott in seinen Reichen (Ascension Oratorio; Ascension)	D maj.	satbSATB 3Tr Tmp 2Fl 2Ob Str Bc	2: 1	II/8: 1	after Z 5741b (/6), 5264b (/9); text by Picander?, Rist (/6), Sacer (/9), after Lk 24:50ff., Acts 1:9–12, Mk 16:19	00013
11/6	4.	1738-05-15	chorale setting "Nun lieget alles unter dir" (= "Du Lebensfürst, Herr Jesu Christ", s. 4)	D maj.	SATB	2: 32	III/2.2: 198	after Z 5741b; text by Rist	11299
**5.**	Four-part chorales (see also: List of chorale harmonisations by Johann Sebastian Bach)								Up ↑
250	5.	1734–1738	chorale setting "Was Gott tut, das ist wohlgetan" (Three wedding chorales No. 1)		SATB 2Hn Ob Oba Str Bc	13^{1}: 147	III/2.1: 3	text by Rodigast	00320
251	5.	1734–1738	chorale setting "Sei Lob und Ehr dem höchsten Gut" (Three wedding chorales No. 2)		SATB 2Hn Ob Oba Str Bc	13^{1}: 148	III/2.1: 4	text by Schütz, J. J.	00321
252	5.	1734–1738	chorale setting "Nun danket alle Gott" (Three wedding chorales No. 3)		SATB 2Hn Ob Oba Str Bc	13^{1}: 149	III/2.1: 5	text by Rinkart	00322
253	5.	1750 or earlier	chorale setting "Ach bleib bei uns, Herr Jesu Christ"	A maj.	SATB	39: 177	III/2.2: 101	after Z 439; text by Calvisius; ↔ BWV 414	00323
254	5.	1750 or earlier	chorale setting "Ach Gott, erhör mein Seufzen"	D Dor.	SATB	39: 177	III/2.2: 105	after Z 1831a; text by Schechs	00324
255	5.	1750 or earlier	chorale setting "Ach Gott und Herr"	C maj.	SATB	39: 178	III/2.2: 24	after Z 4441a; text by Rutilius	00325
256	5.	1750 or earlier	chorale setting "Ach lieben Christen, seid getrost"	A min.	SATB	39: 178	III/2.2: 19	after Z 4441a; text by Gigas	00326
259	5.	1750 or earlier	chorale setting "Ach, was soll ich Sünder machen"	E min.	SATB	39: 179	III/2.2: 23	after Z 3573b; text by Flittner	00329
260	5.	c. 1735 or earlier	chorale setting "Allein Gott in der Höh sei Ehr"	G maj.	SATB	39: 180	III/2.1: 9 III/2.2: 147	after Z 4457; text by Decius after Gloria	00330
261	5.	1750 or earlier	chorale setting "Allein zu dir, Herr Jesu Christ"	B min.	SATB	39: 180	III/2.2: 206	after Z 7292b; text by Hubert	00331
262	5.	1750 or earlier	chorale setting "Alle Menschen müssen sterben"	D maj.	SATB	39: 181	III/2.2: 88	after Pachelbel; text by Albinus, Rosenmüller	00332
263	5.	1750 or earlier	chorale setting "Alles ist an Gottes Segen"	G maj.	SATB	39: 181	III/2.2: 72	after Z 3842f	00333
264	5.	1750 or earlier	chorale setting "Als der gütige Gott"	G maj.	SATB	39: 182	III/2.2: 91	after Z 1646; text by Weiße	00334
265	5.	1750 or earlier	chorale setting "Als Jesus Christus in der Nacht"	D Dor.	SATB	39: 182	III/2.2: 102	after Z 258; text by Heermann	00335
266	5.	1750 or earlier	chorale setting "Als vierzig Tag nach Ostern warn"	E min.	SATB	39: 182	III/2.2: 120	after Z 1743; text by Herman	00336
267	5.	c. 1735 or earlier	chorale setting "An Wasserflüssen Babylon"	G maj.	SATB	39: 183	III/2.2: 4	after Z 7663; text by Dachstein	00337
267	5.	c. 1735 or earlier	chorale setting "An Wasserflüssen Babylon"	A♭ Maj.	SATB		III/2.1: 98	after Z 7663; text by Dachstein	00337
267	5.	c. 1735 or earlier	chorale setting "Ein Lämmlein geht und trägt	G maj.	SATB	39: 183		after Z 7663; text by Gerhardt	00337
267	5.	c. 1735 or earlier	chorale setting "Ein Lämmlein geht und trägt	A♭ Maj.	SATB		III/2.2: 180	after Z 7663; text by Gerhardt	00337
268	5.	1750 or earlier	chorale setting "Auf, auf, mein Herz"	G maj.	SATB	39: 184	III/2.2: 70	after Z 824; text by Birken	00338
269	5.	1750 or earlier	chorale setting "Aus meines Herzens Grunde"	G maj.	SATB	39: 184	III/2.2: 2	after Z 5269; text by Niege	00339
270	5.	c. 1735 or earlier	chorale setting "Befiehl du deine Wege"	B min.	SATB	39: 185	III/2.1: 47; III/2.2: 170	after Z 5385a; text by Gerhardt	00340
271	5.	c. 1735 or earlier	chorale setting "Befiehl du deine Wege"	B min.	SATB	39: 185	III/2.1: 97; III/2.2: 210	after Z 5385a; text by Gerhardt	00341
272	5.	1730–1761	chorale setting "Befiehl du deine Wege"	D min.	SATB	39: 186	III/2.2: 196	by Bach, C. P. E.?; after Z 5393; text by Gerhardt	00342
273	5.	1750 or earlier	chorale setting "Christ, der du bist der helle Tag"	G min.	SATB	39: 186	III/2.2: 136	after Z 384; text by Alberus	00343
274	5.	1750 or earlier	chorale setting "Christe, der du bist Tag und Licht"	G min.	SATB	39: 187	III/2.2: 145	after Z 343; text by Musculus after "Christe qui lux es"	00344
275	5.	1750 or earlier	chorale setting "Christe, du Beistand"	D Dor.	SATB	39: 187	III/2.2: 122	after Z 993; text by Löwenstern	00345
276	5.	1750 or earlier	chorale setting "Christ ist erstanden"	D Dor.	SATB	39: 188	III/2.2: 110	after Z 8584; text: "Christ ist erstanden"	00346
277	5.	1750 or earlier	chorale setting "Christ lag in Todesbanden"	D Dor.	SATB	39: 189	III/2.2: 11	after Z 7012a; text by Luther	00347
278	5.	c. 1735 or earlier	chorale setting "Christ lag in Todesbanden"	E min.	SATB	39: 190	III/2.1: 92; III/2.2: 212	after Z 7012a; text by Luther	00348
279	5.	c. 1725–1735	chorale setting "Christ lag in Todesbanden"	E min.	SATB	32: 154	III/2.1: 24; III/2.2: 155	after Z 7012a; text by Luther; ↔ BWV 158/4	00349
280	5.	1750 or earlier	chorale setting "Christ unser Herr zum Jordan kam"	D Dor.	SATB	39: 190	III/2.2: 36	after Z 7246; text by Luther	00350
281	5.	1750 or earlier	chorale setting "Christus, der ist mein Leben"	F maj.	SATB	39: 191	III/2.2: 6	after Z 132, Neu Leipziger GB, p 942	00351
282	5.	1750 or earlier	chorale setting "Christus, der ist mein Leben"	G maj.	SATB	39: 191	III/2.2: 184	after BWV 95/1	00352
283	5.	1750 or earlier	chorale setting "Christus, der uns selig macht"	A min.	SATB	39: 192	III/2.2: 112	after Z 6283a; text by Weiße after "Patris sapientia"	00353
284	5.	1750 or earlier	chorale setting "Christus ist erstanden, hat überwunden"	C maj.	SATB	39: 192	III/2.2: 113	after Z 6240b; text by Weiße	00354
285	5.	1750 or earlier	chorale setting "Da der Herr Christ zu Tische saß"	C min.	SATB	39: 193	III/2.2: 110	after Z 2503; text by Herman	00355
286	5.	1750 or earlier	chorale setting "Danket dem Herrn, denn er ist"	A min.	SATB	39: 193	III/2.2: 134	after Z 12; text by Horn	00356
287	5.	1750 or earlier	chorale setting "Dank sei Gott in der Höhe"	F maj.	SATB	39: 194	III/2.2: 182	after Z 5391; text by Mühlmann	00357
288	5.	c. 1735 or earlier	chorale setting "Das alte Jahr vergangen ist"	D Dor.	SATB	39: 194	III/2.1: 11; III/2.2: 93	after Z 381; text by Steuerlein	00358
289	5.	1750 or earlier	chorale setting "Das alte Jahr vergangen ist"	E min.	SATB	39: 194	III/2.2: 183	after Z 381; text by Steuerlein	00359
290	5.	1750 or earlier	chorale setting "Das walt Gott Vater und Gott Sohn"	F maj.	SATB	39: 195	III/2.2: 132	after Z 673; text by Behm	00360
291	5.	1750 or earlier	chorale setting "Das walt mein Gott"	D min.	SATB	39: 195	III/2.2: 42	after Z 4217; text by Förtsch?	00361
292	5.	1750 or earlier	chorale setting "Den Vater dort oben"	C maj.	SATB	39: 196	III/2.2: 141	after Z 4795; text by Weiße	00362
293	5.	1750 or earlier	chorale setting "Der du bist drei in Einigkeit"	D Dor.	SATB	39: 196	III/2.2: 89	after Z 335e; text by Luther after "O lux beata Trinitas"	00363
294	5.	1750 or earlier	chorale setting "Der Tag, der ist so freudenreich"	G maj.	SATB	39: 197	III/2.2: 90	after Z 7870; text after "Dies est laetitiae"	00364
295	5.	1750 or earlier	chorale setting "Des Heilgen Geistes reiche Gnad"	D min.	SATB	39: 197	III/2.2: 120	after Z 370b; text by Gesius after "Spiritus Sancti gratia"	00365
296	5.	1750 or earlier	chorale setting "Die Nacht ist kommen"	G Mix.	SATB	39: 198	III/2.2: 136	after Z 5001; text by Herbert	00366
297	5.	1750 or earlier	chorale setting "Die Sonn hat sich mit ihrem Glanz gewendet"	D Dor.	SATB	39: 198	III/2.2: 137	after Z 923; text by Stegmann; ↔ BWV 447	00367
298	5.	1750 or earlier	chorale setting "Dies sind die heilgen zehn Gebot"	C maj.	SATB	39: 198	III/2.2: 72	after Z 1951; text by Luther	00368
299 [2]	5.	1725–1735	chorale setting "Dir, dir, Jehova, will ich singen"	B♭ maj.	SATB	39: 199	III/2.1: 11; III/2.2: 121	↔ Z 3068; text by Crasselius; → BWV 452	00369
299 [1]	5.	1725–1735	Notebook A. M. Bach (1725) No. 39: chorale setting "Dir, dir, Jehova, will ich singen"	B♭ maj.	S(AT)B (V Bc)	43^{2}: 50	V/4: 126	↔ Z 3068; text by Crasselius; → BWV 452	11543
300	5.	1750 or earlier	chorale setting "Du großer Schmerzensmann"	E min.	SATB	39: 199	III/2.2: 94	after Z 5159a; text by Thebesius	00370
301	5.	1750 or earlier	chorale setting "Du, o schönes Weltgebäude"	D min.	SATB	39: 200	III/2.2: 80	after Z 6773; text by Franck, J.	00371
302	5.	c. 1735 or earlier	chorale setting "Ein feste Burg ist unser Gott"	D maj.	SATB	39: 200	III/2.1: 48; III/2.2: 14	after Z 7377; text by Luther after Ps. 46	00372
303	5.	c. 1735 or earlier	chorale setting "Ein feste Burg ist unser Gott"	D maj.	SATB	39: 201	III/2.1: 10; III/2.2: 148	after Z 7377; text by Luther after Ps. 46	00373
304	5.	c. 1735 or earlier	chorale setting "Eins ist not, ach Herr, dies Eine"	D maj.	SATB	39: 201	III/2.1: 36; III/2.2: 166	after Z 7127; text by Schröder	00374
305	5.	1750 or earlier	chorale setting "Erbarm dich mein, o Herre Gott"	A min.	SATB	39: 202	III/2.2: 20	after Z 5851; text by Hegenwald after Ps. 51	00375
306	5.	1750 or earlier	chorale setting "Erstanden ist der heilig Christ"	F maj.	SATB	39: 202	III/2.2: 100	after Z 288; text after "Surrexit Christus hodie"	00376
307	5.	c. 1735 or earlier	chorale setting "Es ist gewisslich an der Zeit"	B♭ maj.	SATB	39: 203	III/2.1: 22; III/2.2: 155	after Z 4429a; text by Ringwaldt	00377
308	5.	1750 or earlier	chorale setting "Es spricht der Unweisen Mund wohl"	B♭ maj.	SATB	39: 204	III/2.2: 17	after Z 4436; text by Luther after Ps. 14	00378
309	5.	1750 or earlier	chorale setting "Es stehn vor Gottes Throne"	G Dor.	SATB	39: 204	III/2.2: 95	after Z 4298; text by Helmbold	00379
310	5.	1750 or earlier	chorale setting "Es wird schier der letzte Tag herkommen"	E min.	SATB	39: 205	III/2.2: 140	after Z 1423; text by Weiße	00380
311	5.	1750 or earlier	chorale setting "Es woll uns Gott gnädig sein"	B min.	SATB	39: 205	III/2.2: 12	after Z 7247; text by Luther after Ps. 67	00381
312	5.	c. 1735 or earlier	chorale setting "Es woll uns Gott gnädig sein"	A min.	SATB	39: 206	III/2.1: 70; III/2.2: 202	after Z 7247; text by Luther after Ps. 67	00382
327	5.	1750 or earlier	chorale setting "Vor deinen Thron tret ich hiermit"	D maj.	SATB	39: 213	III/2.2: 193	after Z 368; text by Hodenberg?	00397
313	5.	1750 or earlier	chorale setting "Für Freuden lasst uns springen"	G min.	SATB	39: 206	III/2.2: 93	after Z 2339; text by Peltsch	00383
314	5.	c. 1735 or earlier	chorale setting "Gelobt seist du, Jesu Christ"	D maj.	SATB	39: 207	III/2.1: 48; III/2.2: 171	after Z 1947; text by Luther	00384
315	5.	c. 1735 or earlier	chorale setting "Gib dich zufrieden und sei stille"	E min.	SATB	39: 207	III/2.1: 38; III/2.2: 161	after BWV 511; text by Gerhardt; ↔ BWV 512, Z 7417a	00385
316	5.	1750 or earlier	chorale setting "Gott, der du selber bist das Licht"	G min.	SATB	39: 208	III/2.2: 133	after Z 5814; text by Rist	00386
317	5.	1750 or earlier	chorale setting "Gott der Vater wohn uns bei"	D maj.	SATB	39: 208	III/2.2: 78	after Z 8507; text by Luther	00387
318	5.	1750 or earlier	chorale setting "Gottes Sohn ist kommen"	G maj.	SATB	39: 209	III/2.2: 13	after Z 3294; text by Horn	00388
318	5.	1750 or earlier	chorale setting "Gottes Sohn ist kommen"	F maj.	SATB		III/2.2: 214	after Z 3294; text by Horn	00388
319	5.	1750 or earlier	chorale setting "Gott hat das Evangelium"	E min.	SATB	39: 209	III/2.2: 102	after Z 1788; text by Alberus	00389
320	5.	1750 or earlier	chorale setting "Gott lebet noch"	F maj.	SATB	39: 210	III/2.2: 138	after Z 7951; text by Zihn; ↔ BWV 461	00390
321	5.	1750 or earlier	chorale setting "Gottlob, es geht nunmehr zum Ende"	B♭ maj.	SATB	39: 210	III/2.2: 108	after Z 2853; → Z 2855; text by Luther	00391
322	5.	1750 or earlier	chorale setting "Gott sei gelobet und gebenedeiet"	C maj.	SATB	39: 211	III/2.2: 39	after Z 8078; text by Luther	00392
323	5.	1750 or earlier	chorale setting "Gott sei uns gnädig und barmherzig"	F♯ min.	SATB	39: 212	III/2.2: 186	after German Magnificat; text after Ps. 67	00393
325	5.	1750 or earlier	chorale setting "Heilig, heilig, heilig"	F maj.	SATB	39: 212	III/2.2: 138	after Z 8633a; text after Sanctus; ↔ Z 8634	00395
325	5.	1750 or earlier	chorale setting "Sanctus, Sanctus Dominus Deus"	F maj.	SATB	39: 212	III/2.2: 138	after Z 8633a; text: Sanctus; ↔ Z 8634	00395
326	5.	1750 or earlier	chorale setting "Herr Gott, dich loben alle wir"	B♭ maj.	SATB	39: 213	III/2.2: 96	after Z 368; text by Eber	00396
328	5.	1750 or earlier	chorale setting "Herr Gott, dich loben wir"	A min.	SATB	39: 214	III/2.2: 117	after Z 8652; text by Luther after Te Deum	00398
329	5.	1750 or earlier	chorale setting "Herr, ich denk an jene Zeit"	B♭ maj.	SATB	39: 216	III/2.2: 123	after Z 4840; text by Mylius	00399
330	5.	1750 or earlier	chorale setting "Herr, ich habe missgehandelt"	A min.	SATB	39: 216	III/2.2: 21	after Z 3695; text by Franck, J.	00400
331	5.	c. 1735 or earlier	chorale setting "Herr, ich habe missgehandelt"	A min.	SATB	39: 217	III/2.1: 47; III/2.2: 171	after Z 3695; text by Franck, J.	00401
332	5.	1750 or earlier	chorale setting "Herr Jesu Christ, dich zu uns wend"	G maj.	SATB	39: 217	III/2.2: 79	after Z 624; text by William of Saxe-Weimar	00402
333	5.	1750 or earlier	chorale setting "Herr Jesu Christ, du hast bereit'"	G min.	SATB	39: 218	III/2.2: 133	after Z 4711; text by Kinner	00403
334	5.	c. 1735 or earlier	chorale setting "Herr Jesu Christ, ich schrei zu dir"	G min.	SATB		III/2.1: 43	after Z 4486	00404
334	5.	c. 1735 or earlier	chorale setting "Herr Jesu Christ, du höchstes Gut"	G min.	SATB	39: 218	III/2.2: 41	after Z 4486; text by Ringwaldt	00404
335	5.	c. 1735 or earlier	chorale setting "Herr Jesu Christ, meins Lebens Licht"	E min.	SATB	39: 218	III/2.1: 60; III/2.2: 175	after Z 423; text by Behm	00405
335	5.	c. 1735 or earlier	chorale setting "O Jesu, du mein Bräutigam"	E min.	SATB	39: 218	III/2.2: 139	after Z 423; text by Hermann	00405
336	5.	1750 or earlier	chorale setting "Herr Jesu Christ, wahr' Mensch und Gott"	A maj.	SATB	39: 219	III/2.2: 106	after Z 423; text by Eber	00406
337	5.	1750 or earlier	chorale setting "Herr, nun lass in Friede"	A min.	SATB	39: 219	III/2.2: 107	after Z 3302; text by Behme	00407
338	5.	1750 or earlier	chorale setting "Herr, straf mich nicht in deinem Zorn, das bitt"	A min.	SATB	39: 220	III/2.2: 131	after Z 4606a; text after Ps. 6	00408
339	5.	1750 or earlier	chorale setting "Wer in dem Schutz des Höchsten ist"	A maj.	SATB	39: 220	III/2.2: 84	after Z 4438; text by Heyden	00409
339	5.	1750 or earlier	chorale setting "Herr, wie du willt, so schicks mit mir"	A maj.	SATB	39: 220	III/2.2: 84	after Z 4438; text by Bienemann	00409
340	5.	c. 1735 or earlier	chorale setting "Herzlich lieb hab ich dich, o Herr"	C maj.	SATB	39: 221	III/2.1: 42; III/2.2: 164	after Z 8326; text by Schalling	00410
341	5.	1750 or earlier	chorale setting "Heut ist, o Mensch, ein großer Trauertag"	G Dor.	SATB	39: 221	III/2.2: 96	after Z 8569/A; text by Löwenstern	00411
342	5.	1750 or earlier	chorale setting "Heut triumphieret Gottes Sohn"	A min.	SATB	39: 222	III/2.2: 44	after Z 2585; text by Stolzhagen	00412
343	5.	1750 or earlier	chorale setting "Hilf, Gott, dass mirs gelinge"	G Dor.	SATB	39: 222	III/2.2: 112	after Z 4329f; text by Müller, H.	00413
344	5.	1750 or earlier	chorale setting "Hilf, Herr Jesu, lass gelingen"	G Dor.	SATB	39: 223	III/2.2: 89	after Z 3687a; text by Rist	00414
345	5.	c. 1735 or earlier	chorale setting "Ich bin ja, Herr, in deiner Macht"	G min.	SATB	39: 223	III/2.1: 13; III/2.2: 148	↔ Z 5878a; text by Dach	00415
346	5.	1750 or earlier	chorale setting "Ich dank dir, Gott, für deine Wohltat"	C maj.	SATB	39: 224	III/2.2: 132	after Z 8090; text by Freder	00416
347	5.	1750 or earlier	chorale setting "Ich dank dir, lieber Herre"	A maj.	SATB	39: 224	III/2.2: 2	after Z 5354a–b; text by Kolross	00417
348	5.	c. 1735 or earlier	chorale setting "Ich dank dir, lieber Herre"	B♭ maj.	SATB	39: 225	III/2.1: 39; III/2.2: 162	after Z 5354a–b; text by Kolross	00418
349	5.	1750 or earlier	chorale setting "Ich dank dir schon durch deinen Sohn"	F maj.	SATB	39: 225	III/2.2: 106	after Z 247b; text by Burchart	00419
350	5.	1750 or earlier	chorale setting "Ich danke dir, Herr Gott, in deinem Throne"	G min.	SATB	39: 226	III/2.2: 135	after Z 3199; text by Fabricius	00420
351	5.	1750 or earlier	chorale setting "Ich hab mein Sach Gott heimgestellt"	G Dor.	SATB	39: 226	III/2.2: 13	after Z 1679; text by Leon	00421
366	5.	1750 or earlier	chorale setting "Ihr Gestirn, ihr hohlen Lüfte"	D min.	SATB	39: 236	III/2.2: 92	after Z 3703; text by Franck, J.	00436
367	5.	1750 or earlier	chorale setting "In allen meinen Taten"	C maj.	SATB	39: 236	III/2.2: 81	after Z 2276; text by Fleming	00437
368	5.	1750 or earlier	chorale setting "In dulci jubilo"	F maj.	SATB	39: 236	III/2.2: 83	after Z 4947	00438
352	5.	1750 or earlier	chorale setting "Jesu, der du meine Seele"	A min.	SATB	39: 227	III/2.2: 22	after Z 6804; text by Rist	00422
353	5.	c. 1735 or earlier	chorale setting "Jesu, der du meine Seele"	G min.	SATB	39: 228	III/2.1: 26; III/2.2: 160	after Z 6804; text by Rist	00423
354	5.	c. 1735 or earlier	chorale setting "Jesu, der du meine Seele"	B♭ Dor.	SATB	39: 228	III/2.1: 99; III/2.2: 211	after Z 6804; text by Rist	00424
355	5.	1750 or earlier	chorale setting "Jesu, der du selbsten wohl"	A maj.	SATB	39: 229	III/2.2: 97	after Z 6335; text by Bapzien	00425
356	5.	1750 or earlier	chorale setting "Jesu, du mein liebstes Leben"	G min.	SATB	39: 230	III/2.2: 144	after Z 7891; text by Rist	00426
357	5.	1750 or earlier	chorale setting "Jesu, Jesu, du bist mein"	C Dor.	SATB	39: 230	III/2.2: 144	↔ BWV 470, Z 6446	00427
358	5.	c. 1735 or earlier	chorale setting "Jesu, meine Freude"	D min.	SATB	39: 231	III/2.1: 80; III/2.2: 204	after Z 8032; text by Franck, J.	00428
360	5.	c. 1735 or earlier	chorale setting "Jesu, meiner Seelen Wonne"	B♭ maj.	SATB	39: 232	III/2.1: 73; III/2.2: 201	after Z 6551a; text by Janus	00430
359	5.	1750 or earlier	chorale setting "Jesu, meiner Seelen Wonne"	A maj.	SATB	39: 232	III/2.2: 209	after BWV 154/3; text by Janus	00429
361	5.	c. 1735 or earlier	chorale setting "Jesu, meines Herzens Freud"	B♭ maj.	SATB	39: 233	III/2.1: 34; III/2.2: 157	after Z 4797–4798; text by Flittner	00431
362	5.	c. 1735 or earlier	chorale setting "Jesu, nun sei gepreiset"	B♭ maj.	SATB	39: 234	III/2.1: 12; III/2.2: 149	after Z 8477a; text by Hermann	00432
364	5.	1750 or earlier	chorale setting "Jesus Christus, unser Heiland, der den Tod überwand"	G Dor.	SATB	39: 235	III/2.2: 99	after Z 1978; text by Luther	00434
363	5.	1750 or earlier	chorale setting "Jesus Christus, unser Heiland, der von uns den Gottes Zorn wandt"	E min.	SATB	39: 234	III/2.2: 19	after Z 1576; text by Luther	00433
365	5.	1750 or earlier	chorale setting "Jesus, meine Zuversicht"	C maj.	SATB	39: 235	III/2.2: 100	after Z 3432b; text by Louise Henriette of N	00435
369	5.	1750 or earlier	chorale setting "Keinen hat Gott verlassen"	E min.	SATB	39: 237	III/2.2: 73	after Z 5395	00439
370	5.	1750 or earlier	chorale setting "Komm, Gott Schöpfer, Heiliger Geist"	C maj.	SATB	39: 238	III/2.2: 105	after Z 295; text by Luther	00440
371	5.	1750 or earlier	chorale setting "Kyrie, Gott Vater in Ewigkeit"	A min.	SATB	39: 238	III/2.2: 74	after Z 8600c	00441
372	5.	1750 or earlier	chorale setting "Lass, o Herr, dein Ohr sich neigen"	G Dor.	SATB	39: 240	III/2.2: 128	after Z 6863; text by Opitz	00442
373	5.	1750 or earlier	chorale setting "Liebster Jesu, wir sind hier"	G maj.	SATB	39: 240	III/2.2: 74, 190	after Z 3498b; text by Clausnitzer	00443
374	5.	1750 or earlier	chorale setting "Lobet den Herren, denn er ist sehr"	G Dor.	SATB	39: 241	III/2.2: 134	after Z 975; text after Ps. 147	00444
375	5.	c. 1735 or earlier	chorale setting "Lobt Gott, ihr Christen, allzugleich"	G maj.	SATB	39: 241	III/2.1: 45; III/2.2: 164	after Z 198; text by Herman	00445
376	5.	1750 or earlier	chorale setting "Lobt Gott, ihr Christen allzugleich"	A maj.	SATB	39: 242	III/2.2: 197	after Z 198; text by Herman	00446
377	5.	1750 or earlier	chorale setting "Machs mit mir, Gott, nach deiner Güt"	D maj.	SATB	39: 242	III/2.2: 26	after Z 2383; text by Schein	00447
378	5.	1750 or earlier	chorale setting "Mein Augen schließ ich jetzt"	G maj.	SATB	39: 243	III/2.2: 153	after Z 1067; text by Löwenstern	00448
379	5.	1750 or earlier	chorale setting "Meinen Jesum lass ich nicht, Jesus"	G maj.	SATB	39: 243	III/2.2: 87	after Z 3448a	00449
380	5.	c. 1735 or earlier	chorale setting "Meinen Jesum lass ich nicht, weil"	E♭ maj.	SATB	39: 244	III/2.1: 62; III/2.2: 178	after Z 3449; text by Keymann	00450
324	5.	1750 or earlier	chorale setting "Meine Seele erhebet den Herren"	E min.	SATB	39: 212	III/2.2: 73	after German Magnificat; text by Luther after Lk. 1:46–55	00394
381	5.	1750 or earlier	chorale setting "Meines Lebens letzte Zeit"	E min.	SATB	39: 244	III/2.2: 199	after Z 6380; ↔ BWV 488	00451
382	5.	c. 1735 or earlier	chorale setting "Mit Fried und Freud ich fahr dahin"	G Dor.	SATB	39: 245	III/2.1: 40; III/2.2: 28	after Z 3986; text by Luther	00452
383	5.	1750 or earlier	chorale setting "Mitten wir im Leben sind"	A min.	SATB	39: 246	III/2.2: 124	after Z 8502; text by Luther after Media vita	00453
384	5.	1750 or earlier	chorale setting "Nicht so traurig, nicht so sehr"	C min.	SATB	39: 247	III/2.2: 86	↔ Z 3355; text by Gerhardt	00454
385	5.	c. 1735 or earlier	chorale setting "Nun bitten wir den Heiligen Geist"	A maj.	SATB	39: 247	III/2.1: 76; III/2.2: 22	after Z 2029a; text by Luther	00455
386	5.	c. 1735 or earlier	chorale setting "Nun danket alle Gott"	A maj.	SATB	39: 248	III/2.1: 101; III/2.2: 20	after Z 5142; text by Rinkart	00456
387	5.	1750 or earlier	chorale setting "Nun freut euch, Gottes Kinder all"	D Dor.	SATB	39: 248	III/2.2: 104	after Z 364; text by Alberus	00457
388	5.	1750 or earlier	chorale setting "Nun freut euch, lieben Christen gmein"	G maj.	SATB	39: 248	III/2.2: 103	after Z 4427; text by Luther	00458
389	5.	c. 1735 or earlier	chorale setting "Nun lob, mein Seel, den Herren"	C maj.	SATB	39: 249	III/2.1: 32; III/2.2: 159	after Z 8244; text by Gramann after Ps. 103	00459
390	5.	c. 1735 or earlier	chorale setting "Nun lob, mein Seel, den Herren"	C maj.	SATB	39: 250	III/2.1: 58; III/2.2: 176	after Z 8244; text by Gramann after Ps. 103	00460
391	5.	1750 or earlier	chorale setting "Nun preiset alle Gottes Barmherzigkeit"	G maj.	SATB	39: 250	III/2.2: 131	after Z 4089a; text by Löwenstern	00461
392	5.	1734–1750	chorale setting "Nun ruhen alle Wälder"	B♭ maj.	SATB	39: 251	III/2.2: 172	after BWV 97/9; text by Gerhardt	00462
396	5.	1750 or earlier	chorale setting "Nun sich der Tag geendet hat"	A min.	SATB	39: 252	III/2.2: 142	after Z 212b; text by Krieger	00466
397	5.	c. 1735 or earlier	chorale setting "O Ewigkeit, du Donnerwort"	F maj.	SATB	39: 253	III/2.1: 23; III/2.2: 163	after Z 5820; text by Johann Rist; ↔ BWV 513	00467
398	5.	c. 1728–1729	chorale setting "O Gott, du frommer Gott"	D maj.	SATB	39: 254	III/2.2: 182	after Z 5206b; text by Heermann; ↔ BWV 197a/7	00468
399	5.	1750 or earlier	chorale setting "O Gott, du frommer Gott"	G maj.	SATB	39: 254	III/2.2: 184	after Z 5148; text by Heermann	00469
400	5.	1750 or earlier	chorale setting "O Herzensangst"	E♭ maj.	SATB	39: 255	III/2.2: 99	↔ Z 1003; text by Müller von Königsberg	00470
401	5.	1750 or earlier	chorale setting "O Lamm Gottes, unschuldig"	F maj.	SATB	39: 255	III/2.2: 94	after Z 4361a; text by Decius after Agnus Dei	00471
402	5.	1750 or earlier	chorale setting "O Mensch, bewein dein Sünde groß"	E♭ maj.	SATB	39: 256	III/2.2: 114	after Z 8303; text by Heyden	00472
403	5.	1750 or earlier	chorale setting "O Mensch, schau Jesum Christum an"	G Dor.	SATB	39: 257	III/2.2: 116	after Z 3994a–b; text by Specht; ↔ Z 3994c	00473
404	5.	1750 or earlier	chorale setting "O Traurigkeit, o Herzeleid"	A min.	SATB	39: 257	III/2.2: 34	after Z 1915; text by Rist	00474
404	5.	1750 or earlier	chorale setting "O Traurigkeit, o Herzeleid"	F min.	SATB		III/2.2: 215	after Z 1915; text by Rist	00474
393	5.	c. 1735 or earlier	chorale setting "O Welt, sieh hier dein Leben"	A maj.	SATB	39: 251	III/2.1: 44; III/2.2: 163	after Z 2293b; text by Gerhardt	00463
394	5.	c. 1735 or earlier	chorale setting "O Welt, sieh hier dein Leben"	A maj.	SATB	39: 252	III/2.1: 96; III/2.2: 210	after Z 2293b; text by Gerhardt	00464
395	5.	1724–1750	chorale setting "O Welt, sieh hier dein Leben"	A maj.	SATB	39: 252	III/2.2: 208	after BWV 245/11; text by Gerhardt	00465
405	5.	1750 or earlier	chorale setting "O wie selig seid ihr doch, ihr Frommen"	D min.	SATB	39: 258	III/2.2: 124	after Z 1583; text by Dach; ↔ BWV 495	00475
406	5.	1750 or earlier	chorale setting "O wie selig seid ihr doch, ihr Frommen"	D min.	SATB	39: 258	III/2.2: 129	after Z 1581; text by Dach	00476
407	5.	1750 or earlier	chorale setting "O wir armen Sünder"	D maj.	SATB	39: 258	III/2.2: 114	after Z 8187c; text by Bonnus	00477
408	5.	1750 or earlier	chorale setting "Schaut, ihr Sünder"	G Dor.	SATB	39: 259	III/2.2: 98	after Z 8569/B; text by Löwenstern	00478
409	5.	1750 or earlier	chorale setting "Seelenbräutigam"	A maj.	SATB	39: 260	III/2.2: 82, 216	after Z 3255a–b; text by Drese; ↔ BWV 496	00479
410	5.	1750 or earlier	chorale setting "Sei gegrüßet, Jesu gütig"	G min.	SATB	39: 260	III/2.2: 98	after Z 3889b; text by Keymann; ↔ BWV 499	00480
411	5.	1750 or earlier	chorale setting "Singt dem Herrn ein neues Lied"	G maj.	SATB	39: 260	III/2.2: 146	after Z 6424; text by Löwenstern	00481
412	5.	1750 or earlier	chorale setting "So gibst du nun, mein Jesu, gute Nacht"	G Dor.	SATB	39: 261	III/2.2: 119	after Z 849; text by Pfeiffer; ↔ BWV 501	00482
413	5.	1750 or earlier	chorale setting "Sollt ich meinem Gott nicht singen"	D min.	SATB	39: 262	III/2.2: 130	after Z 7886b; text by Gerhardt; ↔ BWV 481	00483
414	5.	1750 or earlier	chorale setting "Uns ist ein Kindlein heut geborn"	G maj.	SATB	39: 262	III/2.2: 86	after Z 439; ↔ BWV 253	00484
415	5.	1750 or earlier	chorale setting "Valet will ich dir geben"	D maj.	SATB	39: 263	III/2.2: 16	after Z 5404a; text by Herberger	00485
416	5.	1724-04-07	chorale setting "Vater unser im Himmelreich"	D min.	SATB	39: 263	III/2.1: 94; III/2.2: 27	after Z 2561; text by Luther after Mt 6:9–13; ↔ BWV 245.1/5	00486
417	5.	c. 1735 or earlier	chorale setting "Von Gott will ich nicht lassen"	B min.	SATB	39: 264	III/2.1: 92; III/2.2: 209	after Z 5264b; text by Helmbold	00487
418	5.	1750 or earlier	chorale setting "Von Gott will ich nicht lassen"	A min.	SATB	39: 264	III/2.2: 192	after Z 5264b; text by Helmbold	00488
419	5.	1726–1761 (CPE)	chorale setting "Helft mir Gotts Güte preisen"	A min.	SATB	39: 265	III/2.2: 64	by Bach, C. P. E.; after BWV 16/6; text by Eber	00489
419	5.	1726–1761 (CPE)	chorale setting "Von Gott will ich nicht lassen"	A min.	SATB	39: 265	III/2.2: 64	by Bach, C. P. E.; after BWV 16/6; text by Helmbold	00489
257	5.	c. 1735 or earlier	chorale setting "Wär Gott nicht mit uns diese Zeit"	A min.	SATB	39: 178	III/2.1: 46; III/2.2: 170	after Z 4441a; text by Luther after Ps. 124	00327
420	5.	1750 or earlier	chorale setting "Warum betrübst du dich, mein Herz"	A min.	SATB	39: 265	III/2.2: 84	after Z 1689a	00490
421	5.	c. 1735 or earlier	chorale setting "Warum betrübst du dich, mein Herz"	A min.	SATB	39: 266	III/2.1: 65; III/2.2: 178	after Z 1689a; ↔ BWV 1164/2	00491
422	5.	c. 1735 or earlier	chorale setting "Warum sollt ich mich denn grämen"	G Mix.	SATB	39: 266	III/2.1: 82; III/2.2: 204	after Z 6461; → Z 6462; text by Gerhardt	00492
423	5.	1750 or earlier	chorale setting "Was betrübst du dich, mein Herze"	G Dor.	SATB	39: 267	III/2.2: 140	↔ Z 6830; text by Herrmann	00493
424	5.	1750 or earlier	chorale setting "Was bist du doch, o Seele, so betrübet"	A min.	SATB	39: 267	III/2.2: 108	after Z 1837; text by Schultt, R. F.; ↔ BWV 506	00494
425	5.	1750 or earlier	chorale setting "Was willst du dich, o meine Seele, kränken"	A min.	SATB	39: 268	III/2.2: 142	after Z 7844; text by Werder	00495
426	5.	1750 or earlier	chorale setting "Weltlich Ehr und zeitlich Gut"	C maj.	SATB	39: 269	III/2.2: 122	after Z 4972; text by Weiße	00496
427	5.	1750 or earlier	chorale setting "Wenn ich in Angst und Not"	E♭ maj.	SATB	39: 269	III/2.2: 85	after Z 4233; text by Löwenstern	00497
428	5.	1750 or earlier	chorale setting "Wenn mein Stündlein verhanden ist"	G maj.	SATB	39: 270	III/2.2: 187	after Z 4482a; text by Herman	00498
429	5.	c. 1735 or earlier	chorale setting "Wenn mein Stündlein verhanden ist"	A maj.	SATB	39: 270	III/2.1: 91; III/2.2: 29	after Z 4482a; text by Herman	00499
430	5.	c. 1735 or earlier	chorale setting "Wenn mein Stündlein verhanden ist"	A maj.	SATB	39: 271	III/2.1: 68; III/2.2: 201	after Z 4482a; text by Herman	00500
431	5.	1750 or earlier	chorale setting "Wenn wir in höchsten Nöten sein"	F maj.	SATB	39: 272	III/2.2: 38	after Z 394; text by Eber	00501
432	5.	1750 or earlier	chorale setting "Wenn wir in höchsten Nöten sein"	G maj.	SATB	39: 272	III/2.2: 146	after Z 394; text by Eber	00502
433	5.	1750 or earlier	chorale setting "Wer Gott vertraut, hat wohl gebaut"	G maj.	SATB	39: 273	III/2.2: 78	after Z 8207; text by Magdeburg	00503
434	5.	c. 1735 or earlier	chorale setting "Wer weiß, wie nahe mir mein Ende"	A min.	SATB	39: 273	III/2.1: 38	after Z 2778; text by Emilie Juliane of B-M	00504
434	5.	c. 1735 or earlier	chorale setting "Wer nur den lieben Gott lässt walten"	A min.	SATB	39: 273	III/2.2: 85	after Z 2778; text by Neumark	00504
435	5.	1750 or earlier	chorale setting "Wie bist du, Seele, in mir so gar betrübt"	E min.	SATB	39: 274	III/2.2: 143	after Z 4092; text by Zeutschner	00505
436	5.	c. 1735 or earlier	chorale setting "Wie schön leuchtet der Morgenstern"	E maj.	SATB	39: 274	III/2.1: 45; III/2.2: 165	after Z 8359; text by Nicolai	00506
437	5.	1750 or earlier	chorale setting "Wir glauben all an einen Gott"	D Dor.	SATB	39: 275	III/2.2: 76	after Z 7971; text by Luther after Creed	00507
258	5.	1750 or earlier	chorale setting "Wo Gott der Herr nicht bei uns hält"	B min.	SATB	39: 179	III/2.2: 194	after Z 4441a; text by Jonas	00328
438	5.	1750 or earlier	chorale setting "Wo Gott zum Haus nicht gibt sein Gunst"	F maj.	SATB	39: 276	III/2.2: 90	after Z 305; text by Kolross	00508
500a	5.	1726-04-19	chorale setting "So gehst du nun, mein Jesu, hin" (in Bach's Leipzig versions of St Mark Passion attributed to Keiser)		SATB Str Bc		II/9: 75	text by Nachtenhöfer; ↔ BWV 500	00571
1084	5.	1726-04-19	chorale setting "O hilf Christe, Gottes Sohn" (in Bach's Leipzig versions of St Mark Passion attributed to Keiser)		SATB Str Bc		II/9: 76	text by Weiße; after BC D 5a/14	01270
1089	5.		chorale setting "Da Jesus an dem Kreuze stund"		SATB		III/2.2: 216	text by Lilius	01275
1122	5.	c. 1735 or earlier	chorale setting "Denket doch, ihr Menschenkinder"	F maj.	SATB		III/2.1: 31; III/2.2: 217	text by Hübner?	01720
1123	5.	c. 1735 or earlier	chorale setting "Wo Gott zum Haus gibt nicht sein Gunst"	G maj.	SATB		III/2.1: 40	after Z 305; text by Kolross	01721
1124	5.	c. 1735 or earlier	chorale setting "Ich ruf zu dir, Herr Jesu Christ"	E min.	SATB		III/2.1: 51	after Z 7400; text by Agricola, J.	01722
1125	5.	c. 1735 or earlier	chorale setting "O Gott, du frommer Gott"	D maj.	SATB		III/2.1: 79	after Z 5206b; text by Heermann	01723
1126	5.		chorale setting "Lobet Gott, unsern Herren"		SATB		III/2.2: 218		01724
**6.**	Songs, Arias and Quodlibet (see also: List of songs and arias of Johann Sebastian Bach)								Up ↑
439	6.	1735–1736 or earlier	song "Ach, dass nicht die letzte Stunde" (Schemelli #831; tune #56)		V Bc	39: 279	III/2.1: 210	↔ Z 6721; text by Neumeister	00509
440	6.	1735–1736 or earlier	song "Auf, auf! die rechte Zeit ist hier" (Schemelli #171; tune #11)		V Bc	39: 279	III/2.1: 123	↔ Z 705; text by Opitz	00510
441	6.	c. 1735 or earlier	chorale setting "Auf, auf, mein Herz, mit Freuden"	F maj.	SATB		III/2.1: 67	after Z 5243; text by Gerhardt	00511
441	6.	1735–1736 or earlier	song "Auf, auf, mein Herz, mit Freuden" (Schemelli #320; tune #27)	F maj.	V Bc	39: 279	III/2.1: 152	after Z 5243; text by Gerhardt	00511
442	6.	1735–1736 or earlier	song "Beglückter Stand getreuer Seelen" (Schemelli #570; tune #39)		V Bc	39: 280	III/2.1: 176	after Z 5970; text by Bonin	00512
443	6.	1735–1736 or earlier	song "Beschränkt, ihr Weisen dieser Welt" (Schemelli #689; tune #47)		V Bc	39: 280	III/2.1: 192	↔ Z 7765; text by Wegleiter	00513
444	6.	1735–1736 or earlier	song "Brich entzwei, mein armes Herze" (Schemelli #303; tune #24)		V Bc	39: 280	III/2.1: 146	after Z 7110–7111a; → Z 7111b; text by Trommer	00514
445	6.	1735–1736 or earlier	song "Brunnquell aller Güter" (Schemelli #335; tune #29)		V Bc	39: 281	III/2.1: 156	after Z 6252b; text by Franck, J.	00515
446	6.	1735–1736 or earlier	song "Der lieben Sonnen Licht und Pracht" (Schemelli #39; tune #2)		V Bc	39: 281	III/2.1: 106	after Z 5659; text by Scriver	00516
447	6.	1735–1736 or earlier	song "Der Tag ist hin, die Sonne gehet nieder" (Schemelli #40; tune #3)		V Bc	39: 281	III/2.1: 108	after Z 923; ↔ BWV 297; text by Rube	00517
448	6.	1735–1736 or earlier	song "Der Tag mit seinem Lichte" (Schemelli #43; tune #4)		V Bc	39: 282	III/2.1: 110	after Z 7512b; text by Gerhardt	00518
449	6.	1735–1736 or earlier	song "Dich bet ich an, mein höchster Gott" (Schemelli #396; tune #31)		V Bc	39: 282	III/2.1: 160	↔ Z 2437; text by Olearius, J. G.	00519
450	6.	1735–1736 or earlier	song "Die bittre Leidenszeit beginnet abermal" (Schemelli #258; tune #17)		V Bc	39: 282	III/2.1: 134	after Z 7429; text by Elmenhorst	00520
451	6.	1735–1736 or earlier	song "Die güldne Sonne" (Schemelli #13; tune #1)		V Bc	39: 283	III/2.1: 104	after Z 8015; text by Gerhardt	00521
452	6.	1735–1736 or earlier	song "Dir, dir, Jehova, will ich singen" (Schemelli #397; tune #32)		V Bc	39: 284	III/2.1: 162	after BWV 299; → Z 3068; text by Crasselius	00522
453	6.	1735–1736 or earlier	song "Eins ist not! ach Herr, dies Eine" (Schemelli #112; tune #7)		V Bc	39: 284	III/2.1: 116	↔ Z 7129; text by Schröder	00523
454	6.	1735–1736 or earlier	song "Ermuntre dich, mein schwacher Geist" (Schemelli #187; tune #12)		V Bc	39: 284	III/2.1: 124	after Z 5741; text by Rist	00524
455	6.	1735–1736 or earlier	song "Erwürgtes Lamm, das die verwahrten Siegel" (Schemelli #580; tune #43)		V Bc	39: 285	III/2.1: 184	after Z 3138; text by Bonin	00525
456	6.	1735–1736 or earlier	song "Es glänzet der Christen inwendiges Leben" (Schemelli #572; tune #40)		V Bc	39: 285	III/2.1: 178	after Z 6969; text by Richter	00526
457	6.	1735–1736 or earlier	song "Es ist nun aus mit meinem Leben" (Schemelli #847; tune #57)		V Bc	39: 286	III/2.1: 212	after Z 6969; text by Omeis	00527
458	6.	1735–1736 or earlier	song "Es ist vollbracht! Vergiss ja nicht dies Wort" (Schemelli #306; tune #25)		V Bc	39: 286	III/2.1: 148	after Z 2692; text by Schmidt	00528
459	6.	1735–1736 or earlier	song "Es kostet viel, ein Christ zu sein" (Schemelli #522; tune #38)		V Bc	39: 286	III/2.1: 174	after Z 2727; text by Richter	00529
460	6.	1735–1736 or earlier	song "Gib dich zufrieden und sei stille" (Schemelli #647; tune #45)		V Bc	39: 288	III/2.1: 188	after Z 7415; text by Gerhardt	00530
461	6.	1735–1736 or earlier	song "Gott lebet noch" (Schemelli #488; tune #37)		V Bc	39: 288	III/2.1: 172	after Z 7951; ↔ BWV 320; text by Zihn	00531
462	6.	1735–1736 or earlier	song "Gott wie groß ist deine Güte" (Schemelli #360; tune #30)		V Bc	39: 289	III/2.1: 158	text by Schemelli; → Z 7937	00532
463	6.	1735–1736 or earlier	song "Herr, nicht schicke deine Rache" (Schemelli #78; tune #5)		V Bc	39: 289	III/2.1: 112	after Z 6863; text by Opitz	00533
464	6.	1735–1736 or earlier	song "Ich bin ja, Herr, in deiner Macht" (Schemelli #861; tune #58)		V Bc	39: 290	III/2.1: 214	after Z 5869a; text by Dach	00534
465	6.	1735–1736 or earlier	song "Ich freue mich in dir" (Schemelli #194; tune #13)		V Bc	39: 290	III/2.1: 126	after Z 5138; text by Ziegler, C.	00535
466	6.	1735–1736 or earlier	song "Ich halte treulich still" (Schemelli #657; tune #46)		V Bc	39: 290	III/2.1: 190	text by Till; → Z 5082	00536
467	6.	1735–1736 or earlier	song "Ich lass dich nicht" (Schemelli #734; tune #51)		V Bc	39: 291	III/2.1: 200	after Z 7455; text by Deßler	00537
468	6.	1735–1736 or earlier	song "Ich liebe Jesum alle Stund" (Schemelli #737; tune #52)		V Bc	39: 291	III/2.1: 202	after Z 4731; → Z 4732	00538
469	6.	1735–1736 or earlier	song "Ich steh an deiner Krippen hier" (Schemelli #195; tune #14)		V Bc	39: 292	III/2.1: 128	↔ Z 4663; text by Gerhardt	00539
476	6.	1735–1736 or earlier	song "Ihr Gestirn, ihr hohlen Lüfte" (Schemelli #197; tune #15)		V Bc	39: 294	III/2.1: 130	after Z 3703; text by Franck, J.	00546
471	6.	1735–1736 or earlier	song "Jesu, deine Liebeswunden" (Schemelli #139; tune #10)		V Bc	39: 292	III/2.1: 122	text by Wegleit.?; → Z 1302	00541
470	6.	1735–1736 or earlier	song "Jesu, Jesu, du bist mein" (Schemelli #741; tune #53)		V Bc	39: 292	III/2.1: 204	↔ BWV 357; → Z 6446	00540
472	6.	1735–1736 or earlier	song "Jesu, meines Glaubens Zier" (Schemelli #119; tune #8)		V Bc	39: 293	III/2.1: 118	after Z 6453; text by Sacer	00542
473	6.	1735–1736 or earlier	song "Jesu, meines Herzens Freud" (Schemelli #696; tune #48)		V Bc	39: 293	III/2.1: 194	after Z 4797–4798; text by Flittner	00543
474	6.	1735–1736 or earlier	song "Jesus ist das schönste Licht" (Schemelli #463; tune #33)		V Bc	39: 293	III/2.1: 164	after Z 6412; text by Richter	00544
475	6.	1735–1736 or earlier	song "Jesus, unser Trost und Leben" (Schemelli #333; tune #28)		V Bc	39: 294	III/2.1: 154	after Z 4918; text by Homburg	00545
477	6.	1735–1736 or earlier	song "Kein Stündlein geht dahin" (Schemelli #869; tune #60)		V Bc	39: 294	III/2.1: 218	after 4243b; text by Franck, M.?	00547
478	6.	1735–1736 or earlier	song "Komm, süßer Tod" (Schemelli #868; tune #59)		V Bc	39: 295	III/2.1: 216	→ Z 4400	00548
479	6.	1735–1736 or earlier	song "Kommt, Seelen, dieser Tag" (Schemelli #936; tune #67)		V Bc	39: 295	III/2.1: 232	→ Z 5185; text by Löscher	00549
480	6.	1735–1736 or earlier	song "Kommt wieder aus der finstern Gruft" (Schemelli #938; tune #68)		V Bc	39: 296	III/2.1: 234	→ Z 4709; text by Löscher	00550
481	6.	1735–1736 or earlier	song "Lasset uns mit Jesu ziehen" (Schemelli #281; tune #18)		V Bc	39: 296	III/2.1: 136	after Z 7886b; ↔ BWV 413; text by Birken	00551
482	6.	1735–1736 or earlier	song "Liebes Herz, bedenke doch" (Schemelli #467; tune #34)		V Bc	39: 297	III/2.1: 166	after Z 6434; text by Koitsch	00552
483	6.	1735–1736 or earlier	song "Liebster Gott, wann werd ich sterben" (Schemelli #873; tune #61)	E♭ maj.	V Bc	39: 297	III/2.1: 220	after Z 6634; text by Neumann	00553
484	6.	1735–1736 or earlier	song "Liebster Herr Jesu, wo bleibst du so lange" (Schemelli #874; tune #62)		V Bc	39: 298	III/2.1: 222	↔ Z 3969; text by Weselowius	00554
485	6.	1735–1736 or earlier	song "Liebster Immanuel, Herzog der Frommen" (Schemelli #761; tune #54)		V Bc	39: 298	III/2.1: 206	after Z 4932c; text by Fritsch	00555
488	6.	1735–1736 or earlier	song "Meines Lebens letzte Zeit" (Schemelli #881; tune #63)		V Bc	39: 299	III/2.1: 224	after Z 6380; ↔ BWV 381	00558
486	6.	1735–1736 or earlier	song "Mein Jesu, dem die Seraphinen" (Schemelli #121; tune #9)		V Bc	39: 298	III/2.1: 120	after Z 5988; text by Deßler	00556
487	6.	1735–1736 or earlier	song "Mein Jesu! was vor Seelenweh" (Schemelli #283; tune #19)		V Bc	39: 299	III/2.1: 138	text by Schemelli?; → Z 8383	00557
489	6.	1735–1736 or earlier	song "Nicht so traurig, nicht so sehr" (Schemelli #574; tune #41)		V Bc	39: 300	III/2.1: 180	after Z 3342; text by Gerhardt?	00559
490	6.	1735–1736 or earlier	song "Nur mein Jesus ist mein Leben" (Schemelli #700; tune #49)		V Bc	39: 300	III/2.1: 196	after Z 8404c	00560
491	6.	1735–1736 or earlier	song "O du Liebe meiner Liebe" (Schemelli #284; tune #20)		V Bc	39: 300	III/2.1: 140	after Z 6693; text by Senitz	00561
492	6.	1735–1736 or earlier	song "O finstre Nacht, wenn wirst du doch vergehen" (Schemelli #891; tune #64)		V Bc	39: 301	III/2.1: 226	↔ Z 6171; text by Breithaupt	00562
493	6.	1735–1736 or earlier	song "O Jesulein süß, o Jesulein mild" (Schemelli #203; tune #16)		V Bc	39: 302	III/2.1: 132	after Z 2016a; text by Thilo	00563
494	6.	1735–1736 or earlier	song "O liebe Seele, zieh die Sinnen" (Schemelli #575; tune #42)		V Bc	39: 302	III/2.1: 182	→ Z 7787	00564
495	6.	1735–1736 or earlier	song "O wie selig seid ihr doch, ihr Frommen" (Schemelli #894; tune #65)		V Bc	39: 302	III/2.1: 228	after Z 1583; ↔ BWV 405; text by Dach	00565
496	6.	1735–1736 or earlier	song "Seelenbräutigam" (Schemelli #472; tune #35)		V Bc	39: 303	III/2.1: 168	after Z 3255a–b; ↔ BWV 409; text by Drese	00566
497	6.	1735–1736 or earlier	song "Seelenweide" (Schemelli #710; tune #50)		V Bc	39: 303	III/2.1: 198	after Z 1286; text by Drese	00567
499	6.	1735–1736 or earlier	song "Sei gegrüßet, Jesu gütig" (Schemelli #293; tune #22)		V Bc	39: 304	III/2.1: 143	after Z 3889b; ↔ BWV 410; text by Keymann	00569
498	6.	1735–1736 or earlier	song "Selig, wer an Jesum denkt" (Schemelli #292; tune #21)		V Bc	39: 304	III/2.1: 142	→ Z 4846	00568
500	6.	1735–1736 or earlier	song "So gehst du nun, mein Jesu hin" (Schemelli #296; tune #23)		V Bc	39: 304	III/2.1: 144	after Z 7631b; ↔ BWV 500a; text by Nachtenhöfer	00570
501	6.	1735–1736 or earlier	song "So gibst du nun, mein Jesu, gute Nacht" (Schemelli #315; tune #26)		V Bc	39: 304	III/2.1: 150	after Z 849; ↔ BWV 412; text by Pfeiffer	00572
502	6.	1735–1736 or earlier	song "So wünsch ich mir zu guter Letzt" (Schemelli #901; tune #66)		V Bc	39: 305	III/2.1: 230	↔ Z 5892; text by Rist	00573
503	6.	1735–1736 or earlier	song "Steh ich bei meinem Gott" (Schemelli #945; tune #69)		V Bc	39: 305	III/2.1: 236	after Z 5207; text by Herrnschmidt	00574
504	6.	1735–1736 or earlier	song "Vergiss mein nicht, dass ich dein nicht vergesse" (Schemelli #475; tune #36)		V Bc	39: 306	III/2.1: 170	after Z 4779; text by Arnold	00575
505	6.	1735–1736 or earlier	song "Vergiss mein nicht, ..., Mein allerliebster Gott" (Schemelli #627; tune #44)		V Bc	39: 306	III/2.1: 186	text by Arnold; → Z 4233	00576
506	6.	1735–1736 or earlier	song "Was bist du doch, o Seele, so betrübt" (Schemelli #779; tune #55)	A min.	V Bc	39: 307	III/2.1: 208	after Z 1837; ↔ BWV 424; text by Schultt, R. F.	00577
507	6.	1735–1736 or earlier	song "Wo ist mein Schäflein, das ich liebe" (Schemelli #108; tune #6)		V Bc	39: 308	III/2.1: 114	after Z 5958a; text by Schultt, J. P.	00578
508	6.	1718-11-16 (GHS) after 1733–1734 (AMB)	Notebook A. M. Bach (1725) No. 25: aria "Bist du bei mir"	E♭ maj.	V Bc	43^{2}: 36; 39: 309	V/4: 102	after Stölzel (Diomedes)	00579
509	6.	1725–1733 (AMB)	Notebook A. M. Bach (1725) No. 41: aria "Gedenke doch, mein Geist, zurücke"		V Bc	43^{2}: 52; 39: 310	V/4: 128		00580
510	6.	1725–1733	Notebook A. M. Bach (1725) No. 12: song "Gib dich zufrieden und sei stille"	F maj.	V Bc	43^{2}: 30; 39: 311	V/4: 91		00581
511	6.	1725–1733	Notebook A. M. Bach (1725) No. 13a: song "Gib dich zufrieden und sei stille"	G min.	V Bc	43^{2}: 31; 39: 287	V/4: 91	text by Gerhardt; → BWV 512	00582
512	6.	1725–1733	Notebook A. M. Bach (1725) No. 13b: song "Gib dich zufrieden und sei stille"	E min.	V Bc	43^{2}: 31; 39: 287	V/4: 91	after BWV 511; ↔ BWV 315, Z 7417a; text by Gerhardt	00583
513	6.	1725–1733 (AMB)	Notebook A. M. Bach (1725) No. 42: song "O Ewigkeit, du Donnerwort"		V Bc	43^{2}: 52; 39: 301	V/4: 129	↔ BWV 397; text by Rist	00584
514	6.	1725–1733 (AMB)	Notebook A. M. Bach (1725) No. 35: song "Schaffs mit mir, Gott"		V Bc	43^{2}: 48; 39: 303	V/4: 125	text by Schmolck	00585
515	6.	after 1733–1734	Notebook A. M. Bach (1725) No. 20a: aria "So oft ich meine Tobackspfeife"	D min.	V Bc	43^{2}: 34	V/4: 98	by Bach, G. H.?; → BWV 515a	00586
515a	6.	after 1733–1734	Notebook A. M. Bach (1725) No. 20b: aria "So oft ich meine Tobackspfeife"	G min.	V Bc	43^{2}: 34; 39: 309	V/4: 98	after BWV 515	00587
516	6.	after 1733–1734 (AMB)	Notebook A. M. Bach (1725) No. 33: aria "Warum betrübst du dich"		V Bc	43^{2}: 46; 39: 307	V/4: 121		00588
517	6.	after 1733–1734 (AMB)	Notebook A. M. Bach (1725) No. 40: song "Wie wohl ist mir, o Freund der Seelen"		V Bc	43^{2}: 51; 39: 307	V/4: 128	text by Deßler	00589
518	6.	after 1725	Notebook A. M. Bach (1725) No. 37: aria "Willst du dein Herz mir schenken" a.k.a. "Aria di G(i)ovannini"		V Bc	43^{2}: 49; 39: 311	V/4: 126		00590
519	6.	c.1736?	Five Hymns from SBB Bach P 802 No. 1: "Hier lieg ich nun, o Vater aller Gnaden"		V Bc			by Krebs, J. L.?; in Spitta III, pp. 401–403	00591
520	6.	c.1736?	Five Hymns from SBB Bach P 802 No. 2: "Das walt mein Gott, Gott Vater, Sohn und heilger Geist"		V Bc			by Krebs, J. L.?; in Spitta III, pp. 401–403	00592
521	6.	c.1736?	Five Hymns from SBB Bach P 802 No. 3: "Gott, mein Herz dir Dank zusendet"		V		III/3	by Krebs, J. L.?; in Spitta III, pp. 401–403	00593
522	6.	c.1736?	Five Hymns from SBB Bach P 802 No. 4: "Meine Seele, lass es gehen, wie es in der Welt jetzt geht"		V			by Krebs, J. L.?; in Spitta III, pp. 401–403	00594
523	6.	c.1736?	Five Hymns from SBB Bach P 802 No. 5: "Ich gnüge mich an meinem Stande"		V			by Krebs, J. L.?; in Spitta III, pp. 401–403	00595
524	6.	1707 – July 1708	Quodlibet (incomplete; wedding?)		SATB (SBBB) Bc	NBG 32^{2}	I/41: 69		00596
**7.**	Works for organ (see also: List of organ compositions by Johann Sebastian Bach)								Up ↑
525	7.	1727–1731	Trio Sonata No. 1/6	E♭ maj.	Organ	15: 3	IV/7: 1	→ BWV 525a	00597
526	7.	1727–1731	Trio Sonata No. 2/6	C min.	Organ	15: 13	IV/7: 14		00598
527	7.	1727–1731	Trio Sonata No. 3/6 (+e. v. for /1)	D min.	Organ	15: 26	IV/7: 28	→ BWV 1044/2	00599
528	7.	1727–1731	Trio Sonata No. 4/6 (+e. v. for /2, /3)	E min.	Organ	15: 40	IV/7: 44	after BWV 76/8	00600
529	7.	1727–1731	Trio Sonata No. 5/6 (+e. v. for /2)	C maj.	Organ	15: 50	IV/7: 56		00601
530	7.	1727–1731	Trio Sonata No. 6/6	G maj.	Organ	15: 66	IV/7: 76		00602
531	7.	c. 1703–1706	Prelude and Fugue	C maj.	Organ	15: 81	IV/5: 3	in Möllersche Handschrift	00603
532.2	7.	c. 1708–1712	Prelude and Fugue	D maj.	Organ	15: 88	IV/5: 58	after BWV 912/1, 532.1	00604
532.1	7.		Fugue (early version)	D maj.	Organ		IV/6: 95	→ BWV 532.2/2	00605
533	7.	c.1704	Prelude and Fugue ("Cathedral")	E min.	Organ	15: 100	IV/5: 90	↔ BWV 533a	00606
533a	7.		Prelude and Fugue	E min.	Keyboard		IV/6: 106	↔ BWV 533	00607
535	7.	after 1717	Prelude and Fugue	G min.	Organ	15: 112	IV/5: 157	after BWV 535a	00609
535a	7.	c.1702–1704	Prelude and Fugue (incomplete)	G min.	Organ		IV/6: 109	→ BWV 535; in Möllersche Handschrift	00610
536	7.	1708–1717	Prelude and Fugue	A maj.	Organ	15: 120	IV/5: 180	↔ BWV 152/1; → 536a	00611
537	7.	1729–1750	Fantasia and Fugue	C min.	Organ	15: 129	IV/5: 47		00613
538	7.	1712–1717	Toccata and Fugue ("Dorian")	D min.	Organ	15: 136	IV/5: 76		00614
539	7.	1724–1750?	Prelude and Fugue	D min.	Organ	15: 148	IV/5: 70	after BWV 1001/2, 1000	00615
540	7.	c.1712–1717?	Toccata and Fugue	F maj.	Organ	15: 154	IV/5: 112		00616
541; 528/3	7.	c.1712–1717?	Toccata and Fugue (Trio BWV 528/3 e. v. as possible middle movement)	G maj.	Organ	15: 169	IV/5: 146	→ BWV 528/3	00617
542	7.	c.1714–1720?	Fantasia and Fugue ("Great"; independent compositions?; fugue also in F minor)	G min.	Organ	15: 177	IV/5: 167		00618
543	7.	after c.1730	Prelude and Fugue	A min.	Organ	15: 189	IV/5: 186	after BWV 543/1a	00619
543/1a	7.	bef. c.1725	Prelude	A min.	Organ		IV/6: 121	→ BWV 543/1	00620
544	7.	1727–1731 (JSB)	Prelude and Fugue	B min.	Organ	15: 199	IV/5: 198		00621
545; 529/2	7.	1708–1717 after 1722	Prelude and Fugue (middle movement BWV 529/2 e. v. removed after 1722)	C maj.	Organ	15: 212	IV/5: 10	after BWV 545a, b; → 529/2	00622
545a	7.	1708–1717	Prelude and Fugue (early version)	C maj.	Organ		IV/6: 77	→ BWV 545b, 545	00623
546	7.	1708–1750	Prelude and Fugue	C min.	Organ	15: 218	IV/5: 35		00625
547	7.	1719–1750	Prelude and Fugue	C maj.	Organ	15: 228	IV/5: 20		00626
548	7.	1727–1731 (JSB)	Prelude and Fugue ("Wedge")	E min.	Organ	15: 236	IV/5: 94		00627
549	7.	1705–1750	Prelude and Fugue	C min.	Organ	38: 3	IV/5: 30	after BWV 549a	00628
549a	7.	bef. c.1703	Prelude (or: Fantasia) and Fugue	D min.	Organ		IV/6: 101	→ BWV 549; in Möllersche Handschrift	00629
550	7.	c.1708–1712	Prelude and Fugue	G maj.	Organ	38: 9	IV/5: 138		00630
551	7.	c.1699	Prelude and Fugue	A min.	Organ	38: 17	IV/6: 63		00631
552	7.	1739	Prelude and Fugue ("St Anne") from Clavier-Übung III	E♭ maj.	Organ	3: 173, 254	IV/4: 2, 105		00632
562	7.	1720–c.1748	Fantasia and Fugue (unfinished fugue added c.1747–1748)	C min.	Organ	38: 64, 209; 44: 4	IV/5: 54		00642
563	7.	c.1704	Fantasia and Imitatio	C maj.	Organ	38: 59	IV/6: 68	in Andreas-Bach-Buch	00643
564	7.	1708–1717	Toccata, Adagio and Fugue	C maj.	Organ	15: 253	IV/6: 3		00644
565	7.	c.1704?	Toccata and Fugue	D min.	Organ	15: 267	IV/6: 31		00645
566	7.	1703–1707	Prelude and Fugue (earliest manuscripts: C major; /1 as Toccata in BGA)	E maj. C maj.	Organ	15: 276	IV/6: 40		00646
569	7.	1703–c.1704	Prelude	A min.	Organ	38: 89	IV/6: 59		00649
1121	7.	c.1708–1709	Fantasia	C min.	Organ		IV/11: 54	in Andreas-Bach-Buch; was Anh. 205	01516
570	7.	c.1698–1704	Fantasia	C maj.	Organ	38: 62	IV/6: 16	in Andreas-Bach-Buch	00650
572	7.	1708–c.1712	Fantasia, a.k.a. Pièce d'Orgue (+reworked version)	G maj.	Organ	38: 75	IV/7: 130, 144		00652
573	7.	c.1723–1724	Notebook A. M. Bach (1722) No. 6 Fantasia (incomplete?)	C maj.	Keyboard	38: 209; 43^{2}: 3	V/4: 39; IV/6: 18		00653
574	7.	after c.1708?	Fugue on a theme by Legrenzi	C min.	Organ	38: 94	IV/6: 19	after BWV 574b; ↔ 574a	00654
574a	7.	after c.1708?	Fugue on a theme by Legrenzi (variant)	C min.	Organ	38: 205	IV/6: 82	after BWV 574b; ↔ 574	00655
574b	7.	c.1707–1713 or earlier	Fugue on a theme by Legrenzi (early version)	C min.	Organ		IV/6: 88	after Legrenzi (theme); → BWV 574a, 574; in Andreas-Bach-Buch	00656
575	7.	1708–1717?	Fugue	C min.	Organ	38: 101	IV/6: 26		00657
578	7.	c.1713 or earlier	Fugue ("Little")	G min.	Organ	38: 116	IV/6: 55	in Andreas-Bach-Buch	00660
579	7.	c.1703–1707	Fugue on a theme by Corelli	B min.	Organ	38: 121	IV/6: 71	after Corelli (theme)	00661
582	7.	c.1709–1710	Passacaglia (and Fugue)	C min.	Organ	15: 289	IV/7: 98	in Andreas-Bach-Buch	00664
583	7.	c.1708–1717	Trio	D min.	Organ	38: 143	IV/7: 94		00665
585	7.	c.1726–1727 (JSB)	Trio	C min.	Organ	38: 219	IV/8: 73	after Fasch J. F., FaWV N:c2/1, /2; arr. by Bach	00667
586	7.	bef. c.1740	Trio	G maj.	Organ		IV/8: 78	after Telemann?	00668
587	7.	c.1714?	Aria	F maj.	Organ	38: 222	IV/8: 82	after Couperin, Les Nations^{III}/4	00669
588	7.	c.1703–1707	Canzona	D min.	Organ	38: 126	IV/7: 118	in Möllersche Handschrift	00670
589	7.	bef. c.1742	Alla breve	D maj.	Organ	38: 131	IV/7: 114		00671
590	7.	c.1723–1727 or later	Pastorella (/1 incomplete?)	F maj.	Organ	38: 135	IV/7: 122		00672
592	7.	c.1714–1717	Concerto for solo organ	G maj.	Organ	38: 149	IV/8: 56	after J. E. of Saxe-Weimar, Concerto a 8; → BWV 592a	00674
592a	7.	c.1714–1717	Concerto for solo harpsichord	G maj.	Keyboard	42: 282	V/11: 150	after BWV 592	00675
593	7.	c.1714–1717	Concerto for solo organ	A min.	Organ	38: 158	IV/8: 16	after Vivaldi, Op. 3 No. 8 (RV 522)	00676
594	7.	c.1714–1717	Concerto for solo organ	C maj.	Organ	38: 171	IV/8: 30	after Vivaldi, RV 208, Grosso Mogul	00677
595	7.	c.1714–1717	Concerto for solo organ	C maj.	Organ	38: 196	IV/8: 65	after BWV 984/1	00678
596	7.	c.1714–1717	Concerto for solo organ (arrangement previously attributed to W. F. Bach)	D min.	Organ		IV/8: 3	after Vivaldi, Op. 3 No. 11 (RV 565)	00679
599	7.	c.1711–1713	chorale setting "Nun komm, der Heiden Heiland" (Orgelbüchlein No. 1)	A min.	Organ	25^{2}: 3	IV/1: 3	after Z 1174	00682
600	7.	c.1711–1713	chorale setting "Gott durch deine Güte" (Orgelbüchlein No. 2)	F maj.	Organ	25^{2}: 4	IV/1: 4	after Z 3294	00683
600	7.	c.1711–1713	chorale setting "Gottes Sohn ist kommen" (Orgelbüchlein No. 2)	F maj.	Organ	25^{2}: 4	IV/1: 4	after Z 3294	00683
601	7.	c.1708–1711 or earlier	chorale setting "Herr Christ, der ein'ge Gottes Sohn" (Orgelbüchlein No. 3; also in Neumeister Collection)	A maj.	Organ	25^{2}: 5	IV/1: 6	after Z 4297a	00684
601	7.	c.1708–1711 or earlier	chorale setting "Herr Gott, nun sei gepreiset" (Orgelbüchlein No. 3; also in Neumeister Collection)	A maj.	Organ	25^{2}: 5	IV/1: 6	after Z 4297a	00684
602	7.	c.1711–1713	chorale setting "Lob sei dem allmächtigen Gott" (Orgelbüchlein No. 4)	D min.	Organ	25^{2}: 6	IV/1: 7	after Z 339	00685
603	7.	c.1711–1713	chorale setting "Puer natus in Bethlehem" (Orgelbüchlein No. 5)	G min.	Organ	25^{2}: 6	IV/1: 8	after Z 192b	00686
604	7.	c.1711–1713	chorale setting "Gelobet seist du, Jesu Christ" (Orgelbüchlein No. 6)	G maj.	Organ	25^{2}: 7	IV/1: 11	after Z 1947	00687
605	7.	c.1711–1713	chorale setting "Der Tag, der ist so freudenreich" (Orgelbüchlein No. 7)	G maj.	Organ	25^{2}: 8	IV/1: 11	after Z 7870	00688
606	7.	c.1708–1711 or earlier	chorale setting "Vom Himmel hoch, da komm ich her" (Orgelbüchlein No. 8)	D maj.	Organ	25^{2}: 9	IV/1: 13	after Z 346	00689
607	7.	c.1711–1713	chorale setting "Vom Himmel kam der Engel Schar" (Orgelbüchlein No. 9)	G min.	Organ	25^{2}: 10	IV/1: 14	after Z 192a	00690
608	7.	c.1711–1713	chorale setting "In dulci jubilo" (Orgelbüchlein No. 10)	A maj.	Organ	25^{2}: 12	IV/1: 16	after Z 4947	00691
609	7.	c.1711–1713	chorale setting "Lobt Gott, ihr Christen allzugleich" (Orgelbüchlein No. 11)	G maj.	Organ	25^{2}: 13	IV/1: 18	after Z 198	00692
610	7.	c.1711–1713	chorale setting "Jesu, meine Freude" (Orgelbüchlein No. 12)	C min.	Organ	25^{2}: 14	IV/1: 19	after Z 8032	00693
611	7.	c.1714–1716	chorale setting "Christum wir sollen loben schon" (Orgelbüchlein No. 13)	E min.	Organ	25^{2}: 15	IV/1: 20	after Z 297c	00694
612	7.	c.1711–1713	chorale setting "Wir Christenleut" (Orgelbüchlein No. 14)	G min.	Organ	25^{2}: 16	IV/1: 22	after Z 2072	00695
613	7.	c.1740	chorale setting "Helft mir Gotts Güte preisen" (Orgelbüchlein No. 15)	B min.	Organ	25^{2}: 18	IV/1: 24	after Z 5267	00696
614	7.	c.1711–1713	chorale setting "Das alte Jahr vergangen ist" (Orgelbüchlein No. 16)	A min.	Organ	25^{2}: 19	IV/1: 25	after Z 381c	00697
615	7.	c.1708–1711	chorale setting "In dir ist Freude" (Orgelbüchlein No. 17)	G maj.	Organ	25^{2}: 20	IV/1: 27	after Z 8537	00698
616	7.	c.1714–1716	chorale setting "Mit Fried und Freud ich fahr dahin" (Orgelbüchlein No. 18)	D min.	Organ	25^{2}: 24	IV/1: 30	after Z 3986	00699
617	7.	c.1714–1716	chorale setting "Herr Gott, nun schleuß den Himmel auf" (Orgelbüchlein No. 19)	A min.	Organ	25^{2}: 26	IV/1: 32	after Z 7641b	00700
618	7.	c.1714–1716	chorale setting "O Lamm Gottes, unschuldig" (Orgelbüchlein No. 20)	F maj.	Organ	25^{2}: 28	IV/1: 34	after Z 4361a	00701
619	7.	c.1714–1716	chorale setting "Christe, du Lamm Gottes" (Orgelbüchlein No. 21)	F maj.	Organ	25^{2}: 30	IV/1: 36	after Z 58	00702
620	7.	c.1726	chorale setting "Christus, der uns selig macht" (Orgelbüchlein No. 22)	A min.	Organ	25^{2}: 30	IV/1: 37	after BWV 620a	00703
620a	7.	c.1714–1716	chorale setting "Christus, der uns selig macht" (Orgelbüchlein No. 22, e. v.)	A min.	Organ	25^{2}: 149	IV/1: 78	after Z 6283b; → BWV 620	00704
621	7.	c.1711–1713	chorale setting "Da Jesus an dem Kreuze stund" (Orgelbüchlein No. 23)	A min.	Organ	25^{2}: 32	IV/1: 39	after Z 1706	00705
622	7.	c.1711–1713	chorale setting "O Mensch, bewein dein Sünde groß" (Orgelbüchlein No. 24)	E♭ maj.	Organ	25^{2}: 33	IV/1: 40	after Z 8303; → BWV 622 (var.)	00706
622 (var.)	7.	1716–1789	chorale setting "O Mensch, bewein dein Sünde groß" (variant)		Organ			after BWV 622	00707
623	7.	c.1714–1716	chorale setting "Wir danken dir, Herr Jesu Christ" (Orgelbüchlein No. 25)	G maj.	Organ	25^{2}: 35	IV/1: 42	after Z 423	00708
624	7.	c.1714–1716	chorale setting "Hilf Gott, dass mir's gelinge" (Orgelbüchlein No. 26)	G min.	Organ	25^{2}: 36	IV/1: 44	after Z 4329	00709
625	7.	c.1708–1711 or earlier	chorale setting "Christ lag in Todesbanden" (Orgelbüchlein No. 27)	D min.	Organ	25^{2}: 38	IV/1: 46	after Z 7012a	00710
626	7.	c.1711–1713	chorale setting "Jesus Christus, unser Heiland, der den Tod überwand" (Orgelbüchlein No. 28)	A min.	Organ	25^{2}: 39	IV/1: 48	after Z 1978	00711
627	7.	c.1711–1713	chorale setting "Christ ist erstanden" (Orgelbüchlein No. 29)	D min.	Organ	25^{2}: 40	IV/1: 49	after Z 8584	00712
628	7.	c.1711–1713	chorale setting "Erstanden ist der heilge Christ" (Orgelbüchlein No. 30)	D maj.	Organ	25^{2}: 44	IV/1: 54	after Z 1747a	00713
629	7.	c.1711–1713	chorale setting "Erschienen ist der herrliche Tag" (Orgelbüchlein No. 31)	D min.	Organ	25^{2}: 45	IV/1: 55	after Z 1743	00714
630	7.	c.1708–1711 or earlier	chorale setting "Heut triumphieret Gottes Sohn" (Orgelbüchlein No. 32)	D min.	Organ	25^{2}: 46	IV/1: 56	after BWV 630a	00715
630a	7.	c.1708–1711 or earlier	chorale setting "Heut triumphieret Gottes Sohn" (Orgelbüchlein No. 32, e. v.)		Organ		IV/1: 80	after Z 2585; → BWV 630	00716
631	7.	c.1726	chorale setting "Komm, Gott Schöpfer, heiliger Geist" (Orgelbüchlein No. 33)	D min.	Organ	25^{2}: 47	IV/1: 58	after BWV 631a	00717
631a	7.	c.1711–1713	chorale setting "Komm, Gott Schöpfer, heiliger Geist" (Orgelbüchlein No. 33, e. v.)	G maj.	Organ	25^{2}: 150	IV/1: 82	after Z 295; → BWV 631	00718
632	7.	c.1711–1713	chorale setting "Herr Jesu Christ, dich zu uns wend" (Orgelbüchlein No. 34)	F maj.	Organ	25^{2}: 48	IV/1: 59	after Z 624	00719
633	7.	c.1711–1713	chorale setting "Liebster Jesu, wir sind hier" distinctus (Orgelbüchlein No. 36)	A maj.	Organ	25^{2}: 49	IV/1: 61	after BWV 634	00720
634	7.	c.1711–1713	chorale setting "Liebster Jesu, wir sind hier" (Orgelbüchlein No. 35)	A maj.	Organ	25^{2}: 50	IV/1: 60	after Z 3498b; → BWV 633	00721
635	7.	c.1711–1713	chorale setting "Dies sind die heilgen zehn Gebot" (Orgelbüchlein No. 37)	C maj.	Organ	25^{2}: 50	IV/1: 62	after Z 1951	00722
636	7.	c.1711–1713	chorale setting "Vater unser im Himmelreich" (Orgelbüchlein No. 38)	D min.	Organ	25^{2}: 52	IV/1: 64	after Z 2561	00723
637	7.	c.1711–1713	chorale setting "Durch Adams Fall ist ganz verderbt" (Orgelbüchlein No. 39)	A min.	Organ	25^{2}: 53	IV/1: 65	after Z 7549	00724
638	7.	c.1708–1711 or earlier	chorale setting "Es ist das Heil uns kommen her" (Orgelbüchlein No. 40)	D maj.	Organ	25^{2}: 54	IV/1: 66	after BWV 638a	00725
638a	7.	c.1708–1711 or earlier	chorale setting "Es ist das Heil uns kommen her" (Orgelbüchlein No. 40, e. v.)		Organ		IV/1: 83	after Z 4430; → BWV 638	00726
639	7.	c.1708–1711 or earlier	chorale setting "Ich ruf zu dir, Herr Jesu Christ" (Orgelbüchlein No. 41; also in Neumeister Collection)	F min.	Organ	25^{2}: 55	IV/1: 68	after Z 7400; → BWV Anh. 73	00727
640	7.	c.1711–1713	chorale setting "In dich hab ich gehoffet, Herr" (Orgelbüchlein No. 42)	E min.	Organ	25^{2}: 56	IV/1: 70	after Z 2459	00728
641	7.	c.1711–1713	chorale setting "Wenn wir in höchsten Nöten sein" (Orgelbüchlein No. 43)	G maj.	Organ	25^{2}: 57	IV/1: 71	after Z 394	00729
642	7.	c.1711–1713	chorale setting "Wer nur den lieben Gott lässt walten" (Orgelbüchlein No. 44)	A min.	Organ	25^{2}: 58	IV/1: 72	after Z 2778	00730
643	7.	c.1711–1713	chorale setting "Alle Menschen müssen sterben" (Orgelbüchlein No. 45)	G maj.	Organ	25^{2}: 59	IV/1: 74	after Z 6779a	00731
644	7.	c.1711–1713	chorale setting "Ach wie nichtig, ach wie flüchtig" (Orgelbüchlein No. 46)	G min.	Organ	25^{2}: 60	IV/1: 75	after Z 1887b	00732
645	7.	1747–1748	chorale setting "Wachet auf, ruft uns die Stimme" (Schübler Chorales No. 1)	E♭ maj.	Organ	25^{2}: 63	IV/1: 86	after BWV 140/4	00733
646	7.	1747–1748	chorale setting "Wo soll ich fliehen hin" (Schübler Chorales No. 2)	E min.	Organ	25^{2}: 66	IV/1: 90	after Z 2164	00734
646	7.	1747–1748	chorale setting "Auf meinen lieben Gott" (Schübler Chorales No. 2)	E min.	Organ	25^{2}: 66	IV/1: 90	after Z 2164	00734
647	7.	1747–1748	chorale setting "Wer nur den lieben Gott lässt walten" (Schübler Chorales No. 3)	C min.	Organ	25^{2}: 68	IV/1: 92	after BWV 93/4	00735
648	7.	1747–1748	chorale setting "Meine Seele erhebt den Herren" (Schübler Chorales No. 4)	D min.	Organ	25^{2}: 70	IV/1: 94	after BWV 10/5	00736
649	7.	1747–1748	chorale setting "Ach bleib bei uns, Herr Jesu Christ" (Schübler Chorales No. 5)	B♭ maj.	Organ	25^{2}: 71	IV/1: 95	after BWV 6/3	00737
650	7.	1747–1748	chorale setting "Kommst du nun, Jesu, vom Himmel herunter" (Schübler Chorales No. 6)	G maj.	Organ	25^{2}: 74	IV/1: 98	after BWV 137/2	00738
651	7.	c.1740	chorale setting "Komm, heiliger Geist" (Fantasia; Leipzig Chorales 1/18)	F maj.	Organ	25^{2}: 79	IV/2: 3	after BWV 651a	00739
651a	7.	1708–1714	chorale setting "Komm, heiliger Geist, Herre Gott" (Fantasia; e. v.: Weimar)		Organ	25^{2}: 151	IV/2: 117	after Z 7445a; → BWV 651	00740
652	7.	c.1740	chorale setting "Komm, heiliger Geist, Herre Gott" (alio modo; Leipzig Chorales 2/18)	G maj.	Organ	25^{2}: 86	IV/2: 13	after BWV 652a	00741
652a	7.	1708–1714	chorale setting "Komm, heiliger Geist, Herre Gott" (e. v.: Weimar)		Organ		IV/2: 121	after Z 7445a; → BWV 652	00742
653	7.	c.1740	chorale setting "An Wasserflüssen Babylon" (Leipzig Chorales 3/18)	G maj.	Organ	25^{2}: 92	IV/2: 22	after BWV 653a	00743
653a	7.	1708–1717	chorale setting "An Wasserflüssen Babylon" (alio modo; 2nd v.: Weimar)		Organ	25^{2}: 157	IV/2: 133	after BWV 653b; → BWV 653	00744
653b	7.	1708–1714	chorale setting "An Wasserflüssen Babylon" (à 5; 1st v.: Weimar)		Organ	40: 49	IV/2: 130	after Z 7663; → BWV 653a	00745
654	7.	c.1740	chorale setting "Schmücke dich, o liebe Seele" (Leipzig Chorales 4/18)	E♭ maj.	Organ	25^{2}: 95	IV/2: 26	after BWV 654a	00746
654a	7.	1708–1714	chorale setting "Schmücke dich, o liebe Seele" (e. v.: Weimar)		Organ		IV/2: 136	after Z 6923; → BWV 654	00747
655	7.	c.1740	chorale setting "Herr Jesu Christ, dich zu uns wend" (Trio; Leipzig Chorales 5/18)	G maj.	Organ	25^{2}: 98	IV/2: 31	after BWV 655a; ↔ 655 var. 1–4; → 655b–c	00748
655 var. 1	7.	1708–1798	chorale setting "Herr Jesu Christ, dich zu uns wend" (variant 1)		Organ			after Z 624; ↔ BWV 655(a), var. 2–4	00749
655 var. 2	7.	1708–1798	chorale setting "Herr Jesu Christ, dich zu uns wend" (variant 2)	F maj.	Organ			after Z 624; ↔ BWV 655(a), var. 1, 3–4	00750
655 var. 3	7.	1708–1798	chorale setting "Herr Jesu Christ, dich zu uns wend" (variant 3)	F maj.	Organ			after Z 624; ↔ BWV 655(a), var. 1–2, 4	00751
655 var. 4	7.	1708–1798	chorale setting "Herr Jesu Christ, dich zu uns wend" (variant 4)	F maj.	Organ			after Z 624; ↔ BWV 655(a), var. 1–3	00752
655a	7.	1708–1714	chorale setting "Herr Jesu Christ, dich zu uns wend" (Trio; e. v.: Weimar)		Organ	25^{2}: 162	IV/2: 140	after Z 624; ↔ BWV 655 var. 1–4; → 655	00753
656	7.	c.1740	chorale setting "O Lamm Gottes, unschuldig" (Leipzig Chorales 6/18)	A maj.	Organ	25^{2}: 102	IV/2: 38	after BWV 656a	00756
656a	7.	1708–1714	chorale setting "O Lamm Gottes, unschuldig" (e. v.: Weimar)		Organ	25^{2}: 166	IV/2: 146	after Z 4361b; → BWV 656	00757
657	7.	1708–1714	Chorale prelude Nun danket alle Gott (Leipzig Chorales 7/18)	G maj.	Organ	25^{2}: 108	IV/2: 46	after Z 5142	00758
658	7.	c.1740	chorale setting "Von Gott will ich nicht lassen" (Leipzig Chorales 8/18)	F min.	Organ	25^{2}: 112	IV/2: 51	after BWV 658a	00759
658a	7.	1708–1714	chorale setting "Von Gott will ich nicht lassen" (Fantasia; e. v.: Weimar)		Organ	25^{2}: 170	IV/2: 154	after Z 5264b → BWV 658	00760
659	7.	c.1740	chorale setting "Nun komm, der Heiden Heiland" (Leipzig Chorales 9/18)	G min.	Organ	25^{2}: 114	IV/2: 55	after BWV 659a	00761
659a	7.	1708–1714	chorale setting "Nun komm, der Heiden Heiland" (Fantasia; e. v.: Weimar)		Organ	25^{2}: 172	IV/2: 157	after Z 1174; → BWV 659	00762
660	7.	c.1740	chorale setting "Nun komm, der Heiden Heiland" (Trio; Leipzig Chorales 10/18)	G min.	Organ	25^{2}: 116	IV/2: 59	after BWV 660a	00763
660a	7.	1714–1717	chorale setting "Nun komm, der Heiden Heiland" (Trio; e. v.: Weimar)		Organ	25^{2}: 174	IV/2: 160	after Z 1174; → BWV 660, 660b	00764
660b	7.	1708–1714	chorale setting "Nun komm, der Heiden Heiland" (arrangement)		Organ	25^{2}: 176		by Krebs, J. T. (arr.)?; after BWV 660a	00765
661	7.	c.1740	chorale setting "Nun komm, der Heiden Heiland" (Leipzig Chorales 11/18)	G min.	Organ	25^{2}: 118	IV/2: 62	after BWV 661a	00766
661a	7.	1708–1714	chorale setting "Nun komm, der Heiden Heiland" (e. v.: Weimar)		Organ	25^{2}: 178	IV/2: 164	after Z 1174; → BWV 661	00767
662	7.	c.1740	chorale setting "Allein Gott in der Höh sei Ehr" (Leipzig Chorales 12/18)	A maj.	Organ	25^{2}: 122	IV/2: 67	after BWV 662a	00768
662a	7.	1708–1717	chorale setting "Allein Gott in der Höh sei Ehr" (e. v.: Weimar)		Organ		IV/2: 168	after Z 4457; → BWV 662	00769
663	7.	c.1740	chorale setting "Allein Gott in der Höh sei Ehr" (Leipzig Chorales 13/18)	G maj.	Organ	25^{2}: 125	IV/2: 72	after BWV 663a	00770
663a	7.	1708–1717	chorale setting "Allein Gott in der Höh sei Ehr" (e. v.: Weimar)		Organ	25^{2}: 180	IV/2: 172	after Z 4457; → BWV 663	00771
664	7.	1746–1747	chorale setting "Allein Gott in der Höh sei Ehr" (Trio; Leipzig Chorales 14/18)	A maj.	Organ	25^{2}: 130	IV/2: 79	after BWV 664a–b	00772
664a	7.	1708–1717	chorale setting "Allein Gott in der Höh sei Ehr" (Trio; e. v.: Weimar; fair copy)		Organ	25^{2}: 183	IV/2	after BWV 664b; → BWV 664	00773
664b	7.	1708–1717	chorale setting "Allein Gott in der Höh sei Ehr" (Trio; e. v.: Weimar; sketch)		Organ		IV/2: 179	after Z 4457; → BWV 664(a)	00774
665	7.	1746–1747	chorale setting "Jesus Christus, unser Heiland" (Leipzig Chorales 15/18)	E min.	Organ	25^{2}: 136	IV/2: 87	after BWV 665a	00775
665a	7.	1708–1714	chorale setting "Jesus Christus, unser Heiland" (e. v.: Weimar)		Organ	25^{2}: 188	IV/2: 187	after Z 1576; → BWV 665	00776
666	7.	1708–1748	chorale setting "Jesus Christus, unser Heiland" (alio modo; Leipzig Chorales 16/18)	E min.	Organ	25^{2}: 140	IV/2: 91	after BWV 666a	00777
666a	7.	1708–1714	chorale setting "Jesus Christus, unser Heiland" (alio modo; e. v.: Weimar)		Organ		IV/2: 191	after Z 1576; → BWV 666	00778
667	7.	1747–1748	chorale setting "Komm, Gott Schöpfer, heiliger Geist" (Leipzig Chorales 17/18)	C maj.	Organ	25^{2}: 142	IV/2: 94	after BWV 667a	00779
667a	7.	1708–1717	chorale setting "Komm, Gott Schöpfer, heiliger Geist" (e. v.: Weimar)		Organ		IV/2	after BWV 667b; → BWV 667	00780
667b	7.	1708–1717	chorale setting "Komm, Gott Schöpfer, heiliger Geist" (e. v.: Weimar; sketch)		Organ		IV/2: 194	after Z 295; → BWV 667(a)	00781
668	7.	1747–1748	chorale setting "Vor deinen Thron tret ich hiermit" (fragment; Leipzig Chorales 18/18)	G maj.	Organ	25^{2}: 145	IV/2: 113	after BWV 668a	00782
668a	7.	1708–1748	chorale setting "Wenn wir in höchsten Nöten" (e. v.)		Organ		IV/2: 212	after Z 394; → BWV 668	00783
669	7.	1739	chorale setting "Kyrie, Gott Vater in Ewigkeit" from Clavier-Übung III		Organ	3: 184	IV/4: 16	after Z 8600	00784
670	7.	1739	chorale setting "Christe, aller Welt Trost" from Clavier-Übung III		Organ	3: 186	IV/4: 18	after Z 8600	00785
671	7.	1739	chorale setting "Kyrie, Gott heiliger Geist" from Clavier-Übung III		Organ	3: 190	IV/4: 20	after Z 8600	00786
672	7.	1739	chorale setting "Kyrie, Gott Vater in Ewigkeit" from Clavier-Übung III		Org/man.	3: 194	IV/4: 27	after Z 8600	00787
673	7.	1739	chorale setting "Christe, aller Welt Trost" from Clavier-Übung III		Org/man.	3: 194	IV/4: 28	after Z 8600	00788
674	7.	1739	chorale setting "Kyrie, Gott heiliger Geist" from Clavier-Übung III		Org/man.	3: 196	IV/4: 29	after Z 8600	00789
675	7.	1739	chorale setting "Allein Gott in der Höh sei Ehr" from Clavier-Übung III		Organ	3: 197	IV/4: 30	after Z 4457	00790
676	7.	1739	chorale setting "Allein Gott in der Höh sei Ehr" from Clavier-Übung III		Organ	3: 199	IV/4: 33	after Z 4457; → BWV 676a	00791
677	7.	1739	chorale setting "Allein Gott in der Höh sei Ehr" (Fughetta) from Clavier-Übung III		Org/man.	3: 205	IV/4: 41	after Z 4457	00793
678	7.	1739	chorale setting "Dies sind die heiligen zehen Gebot" from Clavier-Übung III		Organ	3: 206	IV/4: 42	after Z 1951	00794
679	7.	1739	chorale setting "Dies sind die heiligen zehen Gebot" (Fughetta) from Clavier-Übung III		Org/man.	3: 210	IV/4: 49	after Z 1951	00795
680	7.	1739	chorale setting "Wir gläuben all an einen Gott" from Clavier-Übung III		Organ	3: 212	IV/4: 52	after Z 7971	00796
681	7.	1739	chorale setting "Wir gläuben all an einen Gott" (Fughetta) from Clavier-Übung III		Org/man.	3: 216	IV/4: 57	after Z 7971	00797
682	7.	1739	chorale setting "Vater unser im Himmelreich" from Clavier-Übung III		Organ	3: 217	IV/4: 58	after Z 2561	00798
683	7.	1739	chorale setting "Vater unser im Himmelreich" from Clavier-Übung III		Org/man.	3: 223	IV/4: 66	after Z 2561; → BWV 683a	00799
684	7.	1739	chorale setting "Christ unser Herr zum Jordan kam" from Clavier-Übung III		Organ	3: 224	IV/4: 68	after Z 7246	00801
685	7.	1739	chorale setting "Christ unser Herr zum Jordan kam" from Clavier-Übung III		Org/man.	3: 228	IV/4: 73	after Z 7246	00802
686	7.	1739	chorale setting "Aus tiefer Not schrei ich zu dir" from Clavier-Übung III		Organ	3: 229	IV/4: 74	after Z 4437	00803
687	7.	1739	chorale setting "Aus tiefer Not schrei ich zu dir" from Clavier-Übung III		Org/man.	3: 232	IV/4: 78	after Z 4437	00804
688	7.	1739	chorale setting "Jesus Christus, unser Heiland, der von uns den Zorn Gottes wandt" from Clavier-Übung III		Organ	3: 234	IV/4: 81	after Z 1576	00805
689	7.	1739	chorale setting "Jesus Christus, unser Heiland, der von uns den Zorn Gottes wandt" (Fugue) from Clavier-Übung III		Org/man.	3: 239	IV/4: 89	after Z 1576	00806
690	7.	c.1700–1717	chorale setting "Wer nur den lieben Gott lässt walten" (Kirnberger collection No. 1)		Organ	40: 3	IV/3: 98	after Z 2778	00807
691	7.	c.1720 or earlier	Notebook A. M. Bach (1725) No. 11 chorale setting "Wer nur den lieben Gott lässt walten" (WFB No. 3; Kirnb. coll. No. 2)		Organ	40: 4; 43^{2}: 30; 45^{1}: 214	V/5: 6 V/4: 90; IV/3: 98	after Z 2778; → BWV 691a	00808
694	7.	c.1700–1717	chorale setting "Wo soll ich fliehen hin" (Kirnb. coll. No. 5)		Organ	40: 6	IV/3: 103	after Z 2164	00813
695	7.	c.1700–1717	chorale setting "Christ lag in Todesbanden" (Fantasia; Kirnb. coll. No. 6)		Organ	40: 10	IV/3: 20	after Z 7012a; → BWV 695a	00814
695a	7.	1700–1789	chorale setting "Christ lag in Todesbanden" (variant)		Organ	40: 153		after BWV 695	00815
696	7.	c.1700–1717	chorale setting "Christum wir sollen loben schon" (Fughetta; Kirnb. coll. No. 7)		Organ	40: 13	IV/3: 23	after Z 297c	00816
696	7.	c.1700–1717	chorale setting "Was fürchtest du Feind, Herodes, sehr" (Fughetta; Kirnb. coll. No. 7)		Organ	40: 13	IV/3: 23	after Z 297c	00816
697	7.	c.1700–1717	chorale setting "Gelobet seist du, Jesu Christ" (Fughetta; Kirnb. coll. No. 8)		Organ	40: 14	IV/3: 32	after Z 1947	00817
698	7.	c.1700–1717	chorale setting "Herr Christ, der ein'ge Gottes Sohn" (Fughetta; Kirnb. coll. No. 9)		Organ	40: 15	IV/3: 35	after Z 4297a	00818
699	7.	c.1700–1717	chorale setting "Nun komm, der Heiden Heiland" (Fughetta; Kirnb. coll. No. 10)		Organ	40: 16	IV/3: 73	after Z 1174	00819
700	7.	c.1699	chorale setting "Vom Himmel hoch da komm ich her" (Kirnb. coll. No. 11)		Organ	40: 17	IV/3: 92	after Z 346	00820
701	7.	c.1700–1717	chorale setting "Vom Himmel hoch da komm ich her" (Fughetta; Kirnb. coll. No. 12)		Organ	40: 19	IV/3: 96	after Z 346	00821
702	7.	c.1700–1717	chorale setting "Das Jesulein soll doch mein Trost" (Fughetta; Kirnb. coll. No. 13)		Organ	40: 20	IV/3: 45	after Z 7597	00822
703	7.	c.1700–1717	chorale setting "Gottes Sohn ist kommen" (Fughetta; Kirnb. coll. No. 14)		Organ	40: 21	IV/3: 34	after Z 3294	00823
704	7.	c.1700–1717	chorale setting "Lob sei dem allmächtigen Gott" (Fughetta; Kirnb. coll. No. 15)		Organ	40: 22	IV/3: 62	after Z 339	00824
706/1; 706/2	7.	c.1700–1717	chorale setting "Liebster Jesu, wir sind hier" (/2 = alio modo; Kirnb. coll. No. 17)		Organ	40: 25	IV/3: 59	after Z 3498b	00826
707	7.	c.1700–1717	chorale setting "Ich hab mein Sach Gott heimgestellt" (Kirnb. coll. No. 18)		Organ	40: 26	IV/10: 87	after Z 1679	00827
709	7.	c.1700–1717	chorale setting "Herr Jesu Christ, dich zu uns wend" (Kirnb. coll. No. 20)		Organ	40: 30	IV/3: 43	after Z 624	00830
710	7.	c.1700–1717	chorale setting "Wir Christenleut habn jetzund Freud" (Kirnb. coll. No. 21)		Organ	40: 32	IV/3: 100	after Z 2072	00831
711	7.	c.1700–1717	chorale setting "Allein Gott in der Höh sei Ehr" (bicinium; Kirnb. coll. No. 22)		Organ	40: 34	IV/3: 11	after Z 4457	00832
712	7.	c.1708	chorale setting "In dich hab ich gehoffet, Herr" (Kirnb. coll. No. 23)		Organ	40: 36	IV/3: 48	after Z 2461	00833
713	7.	c.1700–1717	chorale setting "Jesu, meine Freude" (Kirnb. coll. No. 24)		Org/man.	40: 38	IV/3: 54	after Z 8032; → BWV 713a	00834
713a	7.	1700–1789	chorale setting "Jesu, meine Freude" (Fantasia; variant)		Organ	40: 155	IV/10: 93	after BWV 713	00835
714	7.	1708–1717	chorale setting "Ach Gott und Herr" (Neumeister Chorales No. 13)		Organ	40: 43	IV/9: 26; IV/3: 3	after Z 2050, 2052	00836
715	7.	1703–1717	chorale setting "Allein Gott in der Höh sei Ehr"		Organ	40: 44	IV/3: 14	after Z 4457	00837
717	7.	1708–1717	chorale setting "Allein Gott in der Höh sei Ehr"		Organ	40: 46	IV/3: 8	after Z 4457	00839
718	7.	1703–1708	chorale setting "Christ lag in Todesbanden"		Organ	40: 52	IV/3: 16	after Z 7012a	00840
719	7.	c.1704	chorale setting "Der Tag, der ist so freudenreich" (Neumeister Chorales No. 1)		Organ	40: 55	IV/9: 2, 72	after Z 7870	00841
720	7.	1709?	chorale setting "Ein feste Burg ist unser Gott"		Organ	40: 57	IV/3: 24	after Z 7377; by Bach, J. Michael?	00842
721	7.	c.1703–1707	chorale setting "Erbarm dich mein, o Herre Gott"		Organ	40: 60	IV/3: 28	after Z 5851	00843
722	7.	1708–1717	chorale setting "Gelobet seist du, Jesu Christ"		Organ	40: 62	IV/3: 31	after BWV 722a	00844
722a	7.	1709?	chorale setting "Gelobet seist du, Jesu Christ" (sketch)		Organ	40: 158	IV/3: 30	after Z 1947; → BWV 722	00845
724	7.	c. 1699	chorale setting "Gott durch deine Güte"		Organ	40: 65	IV/3: 33	after Z 3294; in Andreas-Bach-Buch	00847
724	7.	c. 1699	chorale setting "Gottes Sohn ist kommen"		Organ	40: 65	IV/3: 33	after Z 3294; in Andreas-Bach-Buch	00847
725	7.	c.1700–1717	chorale setting "Herr Gott, dich loben wir"		Organ	40: 66	IV/3: 36	after Z 8652	00848
727	7.	1708–1717	chorale setting "Herzlich tut mich verlangen"		Organ	40: 73	IV/3: 46	after Z 5385a	00850
728	7.	1722–1723 or earlier	Notebook A. M. Bach (1722) No. 8 chorale setting "Jesus, meine Zuversicht"		Organ	43^{2}: 5; 40: 74	V/4: 41; IV/3: 58	after Z 3432b	00851
729	7.	1708–1717	chorale setting "In dulci jubilo"		Organ	40: 74	IV/3: 52	after BWV 729a	00852
729a	7.	1708–1717	chorale setting "In dulci jubilo" (sketch)		Organ	40: 158	IV/3: 50	after Z 4947; → BWV 729	00853
730	7.	1708–1717	chorale setting "Liebster Jesu, wir sind hier"		Organ	40: 76	IV/3: 60	after Z 3498b	00854
731	7.	1708–1717	chorale setting "Liebster Jesu, wir sind hier"		Organ	40: 77	IV/3: 61	after Z 3498b	00855
732	7.	1708–1717	chorale setting "Lobt Gott, ihr Christen, allzugleich"		Organ	40: 78	IV/3: 64	after BWV 732a	00856
732a	7.	1708–1717	chorale setting "Lobt Gott, ihr Christen, allzugleich" (draft)		Organ	40: 159	IV/3: 63	after Z 198; → BWV 732	00857
733	7.	1708–1717	chorale setting "Meine Seele erhebt den Herren" (fugue)		Organ	40: 79	IV/3: 65	after Magnificat peregrini toni; by Krebs, J. L.?	00858
734	7.	1708–1717	chorale setting "Nun freut euch, lieben Christen g'mein"		Organ	40: 160	IV/3: 70	after Z 4429a; → BWV 734a	00859
734a	7.	1708–1789	chorale setting "Es ist gewisslich an der Zeit"		Organ	40: 84	IV/10	after BWV 734; arr. by Scholz?	00860
735	7.	c.1700–1717	chorale setting "Valet will ich dir geben" (Fantasia)		Organ	40: 86	IV/3: 77	after BWV 735a	00861
735a	7.	c.1706	chorale setting "Valet will ich dir geben" (early version)		Organ	40: 161	IV/3: 81	after Z 5404a; → BWV 735	00862
736	7.	1708–1717 or later	chorale setting "Valet will ich dir geben"		Org (V Bc)	40: 90	IV/3: 84	after Z 5404a	00863
737	7.	1703–1707	chorale setting "Vater unser im Himmelreich" (Neumeister Chorales No. 18)		Organ	40: 96	IV/9: 36; IV/3: 90	after Z 2561	00864
738	7.	1708–1717	chorale setting "Vom Himmel hoch, da komm ich her"		Organ	40: 97	IV/3: 94	after BWV 738a	00865
738a	7.	1708–1717	chorale setting "Vom Himmel hoch, da komm ich her" (sketch)		Organ	40: 159	IV/3: 94	after Z 346; → BWV 738	00866
739	7.	c.1704	chorale setting "Wie schön leuchtet der Morgenstern"		Organ	40: 99	IV/10: 2	after Z 8359	00867
741	7.	c.1701	chorale setting "Ach Gott, vom Himmel sieh darein"		Organ	40: 167	IV/3: 4	after Z 4431	00869
742	7.	c.1704	chorale setting "Ach Herr, mich armen Sünder" (Neumeister Chorales No. 14)		Organ		IV/9: 28	after Z 5385a	00870
747	7.	1703–1707 or earlier	chorale setting "Christus, der uns selig macht"		Organ		IV/10: 38	after Z 6283b	00875
753	7.	c.1720	chorale setting "Jesu, meine Freude" (unfinished; WFB No. 5)		Organ	40: 163; 45^{1}: 214	V/5: 8	after Z 8032	00882
764	7.	c.1704–1705	chorale setting "Wie schön leuchtet der Morgenstern"		Organ	40: 164	IV/10: 6	after Z 8359	00893
1085	7.	c.1700–1717	chorale setting "O Lamm Gottes unschuldig"		Organ		IV/3: 76	after Z 4361	01683
1090	7.	c.1704	chorale setting "Wir Christenleut" (Neumeister Chorales No. 2)		Organ		IV/9: 4	after Z 2072	01276
1091	7.	c.1699	chorale setting "Das alte Jahr vergangen ist" (Neumeister Chorales No. 3)		Organ		IV/9: 6	after Z 381c	01277
1092	7.	c.1701	chorale setting "Herr Gott, nun schleuß den Himmel auf" (Neumeister Chorales No. 4)		Organ		IV/9: 8	after Z 7641b	01278
1093	7.	c.1704	chorale setting "Herzliebster Jesu, was hast du verbrochen" (Neumeister Chorales No. 5)		Organ		IV/9: 10	after Z 983	01279
1094	7.	c.1699	chorale setting "O Jesu, wie ist dein Gestalt" (Neumeister Chorales No. 6)		Organ		IV/9: 12	after Z 8360	01280
1095	7.	c.1704	chorale setting "O Lamm Gottes unschuldig" (Neumeister Chorales No. 7)		Organ		IV/9: 14	after Z 4361a	01281
1097	7.	c.1699	chorale setting "Ehre sei dir Christe, der du leidest Not" (Neumeister Chorales No. 9)		Organ		IV/9: 18	after Z 8187h	01283
1098	7.	c.1704	chorale setting "Wir glauben all an einen Gott" (Neumeister Chorales No. 10)		Organ		IV/9: 20	after Z 7971	01284
1099	7.	c.1701	chorale setting "Aus tiefer Not schrei ich zu dir" (Neumeister Chorales No. 11)		Organ		IV/9: 22	after Z 4438	01285
1100	7.	c.1704	chorale setting "Allein zu dir, Herr Jesu Christ" (Neumeister Chorales No. 12)		Organ		IV/9: 24	after Z 7292b	01286
1101	7.	c.1704	chorale setting "Durch Adams Fall ist ganz verderbt" (Neumeister Chorales No. 15)		Organ		IV/9: 30	after Z 7549	01287
1102	7.	c.1706	chorale setting "Du Friedefürst, Herr Jesu Christ" (Neumeister Chorales No. 16)		Organ		IV/9: 33	after Z 4373	01288
1103	7.	1699–1709	chorale setting "Erhalt uns Herr, bei deinem Wort" (Neumeister Chorales No. 17)		Organ		IV/9: 35	after Z 350	01289
1104	7.	1699–1709	chorale setting "Wenn dich Unglück tut greifen an" (Neumeister Chorales No. 19)		Organ		IV/9: 38	after Z 499	01290
1105	7.	c.1701	chorale setting "Jesu, meine Freude" (Neumeister Chorales No. 20)		Organ		IV/9: 39	after Z 8032	01291
1106	7.	c.1704	chorale setting "Gott ist mein Heil, mein Hilf und Trost" (Neumeister Chorales No. 21)		Organ		IV/9: 40	after Z 4421	01292
1107	7.	c.1704	chorale setting "Jesu, meines Lebens Leben" (Neumeister Chorales No. 22)		Organ		IV/9: 42	after Z 6794	01293
1108	7.	c.1704	chorale setting "Als Jesus Christus in der Nacht" (Neumeister Chorales No. 23)		Organ		IV/9: 44	after Z 258	01294
1109	7.	1699–1709	chorale setting "Ach Gott, tu dich erbarmen" (Neumeister Chorales No. 24)		Organ		IV/9: 46	after Z 7228c	01295
1110	7.	c.1704	chorale setting "O Herre Gott, dein göttlich Wort" (Neumeister Chorales No. 25)		Organ		IV/9: 48	after Z 5690	01296
1111	7.	c.1701	chorale setting "Nun lasset uns den Leib begraben" (Neumeister Chorales No. 26)		Organ		IV/9: 50	after Z 352	01297
1112	7.	c.1699	chorale setting "Christus, der ist mein Leben" (Neumeister Chorales No. 27)		Organ		IV/9: 52	after Z 132	01298
1113	7.	c.1699	chorale setting "Ich hab mein Sach Gott heimgestellt" (Neumeister Chorales No. 28)		Organ		IV/9: 54	after Z 1679	01299
1114	7.	c.1701	chorale setting "Herr Jesu Christ, du höchstes Gut" (Neumeister Chorales No. 29)		Organ		IV/9: 56	after Z 4486	01300
1115	7.	c.1701	chorale setting "Herzlich lieb hab ich dich, o Herr" (Neumeister Chorales No. 30)		Organ		IV/9: 58	after Z 8326	01301
1116	7.	c.1701	chorale setting "Was Gott tut, das ist wohlgetan" (Neumeister Chorales No. 31)		Organ		IV/9: 60	after Z 5629	01302
1117	7.	c.1701	chorale setting "Alle Menschen müssen sterben" (Neumeister Chorales No. 32)		Organ		IV/9: 62	after Z 6779a	01303
1118	7.	c.1701	chorale setting "Werde munter, mein Gemüte" (Neumeister Chorales No. 34)		Organ		IV/9: 66	after Z 6551	01304
1119	7.	c.1699	chorale setting "Wie nach einer Wasserquelle" (Neumeister Chorales No. 35)		Organ		IV/9: 68	after Z 1294	01305
1120	7.	c.1704	chorale setting "Christ, der du bist der helle Tag" (Neumeister Chorales No. 36)		Organ		IV/9: 70	after Z 384	01306
957	7.	c.1701	chorale setting "Machs mit mir, Gott, nach deiner Güt" (Neumeister Chorales No. 33; a.k.a. Fugue = first half in later arr.)	G maj.	Organ	42: 203	IV/9: 64, 74	after Z 2383	01134
766	7.	c.1706	chorale setting "Christ, der du bist der helle Tag"		Organ	40: 107	IV/1: 114	after Z 384	00895
767	7.	c.1708	chorale setting "O Gott, du frommer Gott"		Organ	40: 114	IV/1: 122	after Z 5138	00896
768	7.	1708–1717 or earlier	chorale setting "Sei gegrüßet, Jesu gütig"		Organ	40: 122	IV/1: 132, 152	after Z 3889b	00897
769	7.	c.1747–1748	chorale setting "Vom Himmel hoch da komm ich her'" (canonic variations; print version)		Organ	40: 137	IV/2: 197	after Z 346; → BWV 769a	00898
769a	7.	c.1747–1748	chorale setting "Vom Himmel hoch da komm ich her" (canonic variations; autograph)		Organ		IV/2: 98	after BWV 769	00899
770	7.	c.1704	chorale setting "Ach, was soll ich Sünder machen"		Organ	40: 189	IV/1: 104	after Z 3574	00900
**8.**	Keyboard compositions (see also: List of solo keyboard compositions by Johann Sebastian Bach)								Up ↑
772	8.	1720-01-22; 1725-01-22	Inventions and Sinfonias No. 1 – Invention No. 1 = WFB No. 32: Preamb. 1	C maj.	Keyboard	3: 1; 45^{1}: 221	V/5: 48; V/3: 2	→ BWV 772a	00902
772a	8.	1720-01-22; 1725-01-22	Inventions and Sinfonias No. 1a – Invention No. 1a	C maj.	Keyboard	3: 342	V/3: 4	after BWV 772	00903
773	8.	1720-01-22; 1725-01-22	Inventions and Sinfonias No. 2 – Invention No. 2 = WFB No. 46: Preamb. 15	C min.	Keyboard	3: 2; 45^{1}: 223	V/5: 76; V/3: 6		00904
774	8.	1720-01-22; 1725-01-22	Inventions and Sinfonias No. 3 – Invention No. 3 = WFB No. 45: Preamb. 14	D maj.	Keyboard	3: 3; 45^{1}: 223	V/5: 74; V/3: 8		00905
775	8.	1720-01-22; 1725-01-22	Inventions and Sinfonias No. 4 – Invention No. 4 = WFB No. 33: Preamb. 2	D min.	Keyboard	3: 4; 45^{1}: 221	V/5: 50; V/3: 10		00906
776	8.	1720-01-22; 1725-01-22	Inventions and Sinfonias No. 5 – Invention No. 5 = WFB No. 44: Preamb. 13	E♭ maj.	Keyboard	3: 6; 45^{1}: 222	V/5: 72; V/3: 12		00907
777	8.	1720-01-22; 1725-01-22	Inventions and Sinfonias No. 6 – Invention No. 6 = WFB No. 43: Preamb. 12	E maj.	Keyboard	3: 7; 45^{1}: 222	V/5: 70; V/3: 14		00908
778	8.	1720-01-22; 1725-01-22	Inventions and Sinfonias No. 7 – Invention No. 7 = WFB No. 34: Preamb. 3	E min.	Keyboard	3: 9; 45^{1}: 221	V/5: 52; V/3: 16		00909
779	8.	1720-01-22; 1725-01-22	Inventions and Sinfonias No. 8 – Invention No. 8 = WFB No. 35: Preamb. 4	F maj.	Keyboard	3: 10; 45^{1}: 221	V/5: 54; V/3: 18		00910
780	8.	1720-01-22; 1725-01-22	Inventions and Sinfonias No. 9 – Invention No. 9 = WFB No. 42: Preamb. 11	F min.	Keyboard	3: 11; 45^{1}: 222	V/5: 68; V/3: 20		00911
781	8.	1720-01-22; 1725-01-22	Inventions and Sinfonias No. 10 – Invention No. 10 = WFB No. 36: Preamb. 5	G maj.	Keyboard	3: 12; 45^{1}: 221	V/5: 56; V/3: 22		00912
782	8.	1720-01-22; 1725-01-22	Inventions and Sinfonias No. 11 – Invention No. 11 = WFB No. 41: Preamb. 10	G min.	Keyboard	3: 13; 45^{1}: 222	V/5: 66; V/3: 24		00913
783	8.	1720-01-22; 1725-01-22	Inventions and Sinfonias No. 12 – Invention No. 12 = WFB No. 40: Preamb. 9	A maj.	Keyboard	3: 14; 45^{1}: 222	V/5: 64; V/3: 26		00914
784	8.	1720-01-22; 1725-01-22	Inventions and Sinfonias No. 13 – Invention No. 13 = WFB No. 37: Preamb. 6	A min.	Keyboard	3: 15; 45^{1}: 221	V/5: 58; V/3: 28		00915
785	8.	1720-01-22; 1725-01-22	Inventions and Sinfonias No. 14 – Invention No. 14 = WFB No. 39: Preamb. 8	B♭ maj.	Keyboard	3: 16; 45^{1}: 222	V/5: 62; V/3: 30		00916
786	8.	1720-01-22; 1725-01-22	Inventions and Sinfonias No. 15 – Invention No. 15 = WFB No. 38: Preamb. 7	B min.	Keyboard	3: 18; 45^{1}: 222	V/5: 60; V/3: 32		00917
787	8.	1720-01-22; 1725-01-22	Sinfonias and Inventions No. 16 – Sinfonia No. 1 = WFB No. 49: Fantasia 1	C maj.	Keyboard	3: 19; 45^{1}: 227	V/5: 90; V/3: 34		00918
788	8.	1720-01-22; 1725-01-22	Sinfonias and Inventions No. 17 – Sinfonia No. 2 = WFB No. 63: Fantasia 15	C min.	Keyboard	3: 20; 45^{1}: 231	V/5: 118; V/3: 36		00919
789	8.	1720-01-22; 1725-01-22	Sinfonias and Inventions No. 18 – Sinfonia No. 3 = WFB No. 62: Fantasia 14	D maj.	Keyboard	3: 22; 45^{1}: 230	V/5: 116; V/3: 38		00920
790	8.	1720-01-22; 1725-01-22	Sinfonias and Inventions No. 19 – Sinfonia No. 4 = WFB No. 50: Fantasia 2	D min.	Keyboard	3: 23; 45^{1}: 227	V/5: 92; V/3: 40		00921
791	8.	1720-01-22; 1725-01-22	Sinfonias and Inventions No. 20 – Sinfonia No. 5 = WFB No. 61: Fantasia 13	E♭ maj.	Keyboard	3: 24; 45^{1}: 230	V/5: 114; V/3: 42	→ BWV 791a	00922
791a	8.	1723	Sinfonias and Inventions No. 20a – Sinfonia No. 5a	E♭ maj.	Keyboard		V/3: 44, 80	after BWV 791	00923
792	8.	1720-01-22; 1725-01-22	Sinfonias and Inventions No. 21 – Sinfonia No. 6 = WFB No. 60: Fantasia 12	E maj.	Keyboard	3: 26; 45^{1}: 229	V/5: 112; V/3: 46		00924
793	8.	1720-01-22; 1725-01-22	Sinfonias and Inventions No. 22 – Sinfonia No. 7 = WFB No. 51: Fantasia 3	E min.	Keyboard	3: 28; 45^{1}: 227	V/5: 94; V/3: 48		00925
794	8.	1720-01-22; 1725-01-22	Sinfonias and Inventions No. 23 – Sinfonia No. 8 = WFB No. 52: Fantasia 4	F maj.	Keyboard	3: 29; 45^{1}: 227	V/5: 96; V/3: 50		00926
795	8.	1720-01-22; 1725-01-22	Sinfonias and Inventions No. 24 – Sinfonia No. 9 = WFB No. 59: Fantasia 11	F min.	Keyboard	3: 30; 45^{1}: 229	V/5: 110; V/3: 52		00927
796	8.	1720-01-22; 1725-01-22	Sinfonias and Inventions No. 25 – Sinfonia No. 10 = WFB No. 53: Fantasia 5	G maj.	Keyboard	3: 32; 45^{1}: 228	V/5: 98; V/3: 54		00928
797	8.	1720-01-22; 1725-01-22	Sinfonias and Inventions No. 26 – Sinfonia No. 11 = WFB No. 58: Fantasia 10	G min.	Keyboard	3: 34; 45^{1}: 229	V/5: 108; V/3: 56		00929
798	8.	1720-01-22; 1725-01-22	Sinfonias and Inventions No. 27 – Sinfonia No. 12 = WFB No. 57: Fantasia 9	A maj.	Keyboard	3: 36; 45^{1}: 229	V/5: 106; V/3: 58		00930
799	8.	1720-01-22; 1725-01-22	Sinfonias and Inventions No. 28 – Sinfonia No. 13 = WFB No. 54: Fantasia 6	A min.	Keyboard	3: 38; 45^{1}: 228	V/5: 100; V/3: 60		00931
800	8.	1720-01-22; 1725-01-22	Sinfonias and Inventions No. 29 – Sinfonia No. 14 = WFB No. 56: Fantasia 8	B♭ maj.	Keyboard	3: 40; 45^{1}: 228	V/5: 104; V/3: 62		00932
801	8.	1720-01-22; 1725-01-22	Sinfonias and Inventions No. 30 – Sinfonia No. 15 = WFB No. 55: Fantasia 7	B min.	Keyboard	3: 41; 45^{1}: 228	V/5: 102; V/3: 64		00933
802	8.	1739	Duet No. 1 from Clavier-Übung III	E min.	Organ	3: 242	IV/4: 92		00934
803	8.	1739	Duet No. 2 from Clavier-Übung III	F maj.	Organ	3: 245	IV/4: 96		00935
804	8.	1739	Duet No. 3 from Clavier-Übung III	G maj.	Organ	3: 248	IV/4: 99		00936
805	8.	1739	Duet No. 4 from Clavier-Übung III	A min.	Organ	3: 251	IV/4: 102		00937
806	8.	1714–1723	English Suites, No. 1	A maj.	Keyboard	45^{1}: 3; 13^{2}: 3	V/7: 2		00938
806a	8.	1714–1717	English Suites, No. 1a	A maj.	Keyboard		V/7: 116		00939
807	8.	1725 or earlier	English Suites, No. 2	A min.	Keyboard	45^{1}: 16; 13^{2}: 16	V/7: 20		00940
808	8.	1725 or earlier	English Suites, No. 3	G min.	Keyboard	45^{1}: 30; 13^{2}: 30	V/7: 38		00941
809	8.	1725 or earlier	English Suites, No. 4	F maj.	Keyboard	45^{1}: 41; 13^{2}: 41	V/7: 54		00942
810	8.	1725 or earlier	English Suites, No. 5	E min.	Keyboard	45^{1}: 53; 13^{2}: 53	V/7: 70		00943
811	8.	1725 or earlier	English Suites, No. 6	D min.	Keyboard	45^{1}: 68; 13^{2}: 68	V/7: 90		00944
812	8.	1722 or earlier	Notebook A. M. Bach (1722) No. 1 – French Suites, No. 1	D min.	Keyboard	43^{2}: VI	V/4: 3		00945
812	8.	1722 or earlier	Notebook A. M. Bach (1725) No. 30 – French Suites, No. 1	D min.	Keyboard	43^{2}: 40	V/4: 109		00945
812	8.	1722 or earlier	French Suites, No. 1 – Version A (Altnickol)	D min.	Keyboard	45^{1}: 89; 13^{2}: 89	V/8: 2		00945
812	8.	1722 or earlier	French Suites, No. 1 – Version B (early version)	D min.	Keyboard	45^{1}: 89; 13^{2}: 89	V/8: 64		00945
813	8.	c. 1722–1725	Notebook A. M. Bach (1722) No. 2 – French Suites, No. 2	C min.	Keyboard	43^{2}: VI	V/4: 10, 42		00946
813	8.	c. 1722–1725	Notebook A. M. Bach (1725) No. 31 – French Suites, No. 2	C min.	Keyboard	43^{2}: 44	V/4: 116		00946
813	8.	c. 1722–1725	French Suites, No. 2 – Version A (Altnickol)	C min.	Keyboard	45^{1}: 94; 13^{2}: 94	V/8: 10		00946
813	8.	c. 1722–1725	French Suites, No. 2 – Version B (early version)	C min.	Keyboard	45^{1}: 94; 13^{2}: 94	V/8: 72		00946
813	8.	c. 1722–1725	French Suites, No. 2 – Version B (early version)	C min.	Keyboard	36: 236	V/8: 72		00946
814	8.	c. 1722–1725	Notebook A. M. Bach (1722) No. 3 – French Suites, No. 3	B min.	Keyboard	43^{2}: VII	V/4: 16, 43	→ BWV 814a	00948
814	8.	c. 1722–1725	French Suites, No. 3 – Version A (Altnickol)	B min.	Keyboard	45^{1}: 100; 13^{2}: 100	V/8: 20	→ BWV 814a	00948
814	8.	c. 1722–1725	French Suites, No. 3 – Version B (early version)	B min.	Keyboard	45^{1}: 100; 13^{2}: 100	V/8: 82	→ BWV 814a	00948
814a	8.	c. 1720–1739	French Suites, No. 3 – Variant	B min.	Keyboard	45^{1}: 100; 36: 237; 13^{2}: 100	V/8: 166	after BWV 814/1–/5, 929, 814/7	00949
815	8.	c. 1722–1725	Notebook A. M. Bach (1722) No. 4 French Suites, No. 4	E♭ maj.	Keyboard	43^{2}: VII	V/4: 23	→ BWV 815a	00950
815	8.	c. 1722–1725	French Suites, No. 4 – Version A (Altnickol)	E♭ maj.	Keyboard	45^{1}: 106; 13^{2}: 106	V/8: 30	→ BWV 815a	00950
815	8.	c. 1722–1725	French Suites, No. 4 – Version B (early version)	E♭ maj.	Keyboard	45^{1}: 106; 13^{2}: 106	V/8: 92	→ BWV 815a	00950
815	8.	c. 1722–1725	French Suites, No. 4 – Version B (early version)	E♭ maj.	Keyboard	36: 236	V/8: 92	→ BWV 815a	00950
815a	8.	c. 1722–1725 or later	French Suites, No. 4 – Variant	E♭ maj.	Keyboard	36: 234; 45^{1}: 106; 13^{2}: 108	V/8: 176	after BWV 815/1–/5	00951
816	8.	c. 1724–1725	Notebook A. M. Bach (1722) No. 5 French Suites, No. 5	G maj.	Keyboard	43^{2}: VII	V/4: 30		00952
816	8.	c. 1724–1725	French Suites, No. 5 – Version A (Altnickol)	G maj.	Keyboard	45^{1}: 112; 13^{2}: 112	V/8: 40		00952
816	8.	c. 1724–1725	French Suites, No. 5 – Version B (early version)	G maj.	Keyboard	45^{1}: 112; 13^{2}: 112	V/8: 102		00952
817	8.	c.1725 or later	French Suites, No. 6 – Version A (Altnickol)	E maj.	Keyboard	45^{1}: 120; 13^{2}: 120	V/8: 52		00953
817	8.	c.1725 or later	French Suites, No. 6 – Version B (early version)	E maj.	Keyboard	45^{1}: 120; 13^{2}: 120	V/8: 114		00953
818	8.	1720–1722	Suite for keyboard (early version)	A min.	Keyboard	36: 3	V/8: 129		00954
818a	8.	after 1721	Suite for keyboard (later version)	A min.	Keyboard	36: 213	V/8: 146		00955
819	8.	before 1726	Suite for keyboard (early version)	E♭ maj.	Keyboard	36: 8	V/8: 136		00956
819a	8.	1725–1728	Suite for keyboard (later version)	E♭ maj.	Keyboard	36: 217	V/8: 156		00957
820	8.	1705–1713	Suite (Ouverture) for keyboard	F maj.	Keyboard	36: 14	V/10: 43		00958
822	8.		Suite for keyboard	G min.	Keyboard		V/10: 68	after unknown model?	00960
823	8.	before 1727	Suite for keyboard	F min.	Keyboard	36: 229	V/10: 50		00961
825	8.	1725–1726	Partita No. 1 from Clavier-Übung I	B♭ maj.	Keyboard	3: 46	V/1: 2		00963
826	8.	1725–1727	Partita No. 2 from Clavier-Übung I	C min.	Keyboard	3: 56	V/1: 15		00964
827	8.	1725–1727	Notebook A. M. Bach (1725) No. 1 = Partita No. 3 from Clavier-Übung I	A min.	Keyboard	3: 70	V/1: 35; V/4: 47		00964
828	8.	1725–1728	Partita No. 4 from Clavier-Übung I	D maj.	Keyboard	3: 82	V/1: 50		00966
829	8.	1725–1730	Partita No. 5 from Clavier-Übung I	G maj.	Keyboard	3: 102	V/1: 72		00967
830	8.	1725–1730	Notebook A. M. Bach (1725) No. 2 = Partita No. 6 from Clavier-Übung I	E min.	Keyboard	3: 116	V/1: 90; V/4: 60	after BWV 1019a/3 /5	00968
831	8.	1733–1735	Overture in the French style (Clavier-Übung II No. 2)	B min.	Harpsichord	3: 154	V/2: 20	after BWV 831a	00969
831a	8.	1727–1733	Overture in the French style (early version)	C min.	Keyboard		V/2: 43	→ BWV 831	00970
832	8.	before 1707	Suite for keyboard	A maj.	Keyboard	42: 255	V/10: 54	in Möllersche Handschrift	00971
833	8.	before 1707	Prelude and partita for keyboard	F maj.	Keyboard		V/10: 60	in Möllersche Handschrift	00972
836	8.	1720–1721	Allemande, Klavierbüchlein WFB No. 6	G min.	Keyboard	45^{1}: 214	V/5: 8	by Bach, W. F. & J. S.?	00975
837	8.	1720–1721	Allemande, Klavierbüchlein WFB No. 7 (incomplete)	G min.	Keyboard	45^{1}: 215	V/5: 10	by Bach, W. F. & J. S.?	00976
841	8.	1720–1721	Notebook A. M. Bach (1722) No. 11 Menuet = WFB No. 11: Menuet 1	G maj.	Keyboard	36: 209; 45^{1}: 215	V/5: 16 V/4: 44	by Bach, W. F. & J. S.?	00980
842	8.	1720–1721	Klavierbüchlein WFB No. 12: Menuet 2	G min.	Keyboard	36: 209; 45^{1}: 216	V/5: 17	by Bach, W. F. (BR A43) & J. S.?	00981
843	8.	1720–1721	Klavierbüchlein WFB No. 13: Menuet 3	G maj.	Keyboard	36: 210; 45^{1}: 216	V/5: 18		00982
846	8.	1722	Well-Tempered Clavier I, P. & F. No. 1	C maj.	Keyboard	14: 3	V/6.1: 2	after BWV 846a	00986
846/1	8.	1725 (AMB)	Notebook A. M. Bach (1725) No. 29 Prelude (short version of WTC I No. 1/1)	C maj.	Keyboard		V/4: 107		00986
846a	8.	1720	Klavierbüchlein WFB No. 14: Praeludium 1 (early WTC I No. 1/1)	C maj.	Keyboard	45^{1}: 216	V/5: 19; V/6.1: 127	→ BWV 846/1	00987
847	8.	1722	Well-Tempered Clavier I, P. & F. No. 2 (/1 = WFB No. 15: Praeludium 2)	C min.	Keyboard	14: 6; 45^{1}: 216	V/5: 20; V/6.1: 2	after BWV 847a	00988
847a	8.		Prelude and Fughetta (early WTC I No. 2)	C min.	Keyboard		V/6.1: 130	→ BWV 847	00989
848	8.	1722	Well-Tempered Clavier I, P. & F. No. 3 (/1 = WFB No. 21: Praeludium [8])	C♯ maj.	Keyboard	14: 10; 45^{1}: 218	V/5: 30; V/6.1: 2	after BWV 848a	00990
848a	8.		Prelude and Fughetta (early WTC I No. 3)	C♯ maj.	Keyboard		V/6.1: 134	→ BWV 848	00991
849	8.	1722	Well-Tempered Clavier I, P. & F. No. 4 (/1 = WFB No. 22: Praeludium [9])	C♯ min.	Keyboard	14: 14; 45^{1}: 218	V/5: 32; V/6.1: 2	after BWV 849a	00992
849a	8.		Prelude and Fughetta (early WTC I No. 4)	C♯ min.	Keyboard		V/6.1: 140	→ BWV 849	00993
850	8.	1722	Well-Tempered Clavier I, P. & F. No. 5 (/1 = WFB No. 17: Praeludium 4)	D maj.	Keyboard	14: 18; 45^{1}: 217	V/5: 23; V/6.1: 2	after BWV 850a	00994
850a	8.		Prelude and Fughetta (early WTC I No. 5)	D maj.	Keyboard		V/6.1: 146	→ BWV 850	00995
851	8.	1722	Well-Tempered Clavier I, P. & F. No. 6 (/1 = WFB No. 16: Praeludium 3)	D min.	Keyboard	14: 22; 45^{1}: 217	V/5: 22; V/6.1: 2	after BWV 851a	00996
851a	8.		Prelude and Fughetta (early WTC I No. 6)	D min.	Keyboard		V/6.1: 150	→ BWV 851	00997
852	8.	1722	Well-Tempered Clavier I, P. & F. No. 7	E♭ maj.	Keyboard	14: 26	V/6.1: 32	after BWV 852a	00998
852a	8.		Prelude and Fughetta (early WTC I No. 7)	E♭ maj.	Keyboard		V/6.1: 154	→ BWV 852	00999
853	8.	1722	Well-Tempered Clavier I, P. & F. No. 8 (/1 = WFB No. 23: Praeludium [10])	E♭ min. D♯ min.	Keyboard	14: 32; 45^{1}: 218	V/5: 34; V/6.1: 38	after BWV 853a; → K. 404a/1	01000
853a	8.		Prelude and Fughetta (early WTC I No. 8)	E♭ min. D♯ min.	Keyboard		V/6.1: 160	→ BWV 853	01001
854	8.	1722	Well-Tempered Clavier I, P. & F. No. 9 (/1 = WFB No. 19: Praeludium 6)	E maj.	Keyboard	14: 36; 45^{1}: 218	V/5: 26; V/6.1: 44	after BWV 854a	01002
854a	8.		Prelude and Fughetta (early WTC I No. 9)	E maj.	Keyboard		V/6.1: 166	→ BWV 854	01003
855	8.	1722	Well-Tempered Clavier I, P. & F. No. 10	E min.	Keyboard	14: 38	V/6.1: 48	after BWV 855a	01004
855a	8.	c.1720	Prelude and Fughetta (early WTC I No. 10) (/1 = WFB No. 18: Praeludium 5)	E min.	Keyboard	45^{1}: 217	V/5: 24; V/6.1: 170	→ BWV 855	01005
856	8.	1722	Well-Tempered Clavier I, P. & F. No. 11 (/1 = WFB No. 20: Praeludium 7)	F maj.	Keyboard	14: 42; 45^{1}: 218	V/5: 28; V/6.1: 54	after BWV 856a	01006
856a	8.		Prelude and Fughetta (early WTC I No. 11)	F maj.	Keyboard		V/6.1: 174	→ BWV 856	01007
857	8.	1722	Well-Tempered Clavier I, P. & F. No. 12 (/1 = WFB No. 24: Praeludium [11])	F min.	Keyboard	14: 44; 45^{1}: 218	V/5: 36; V/6.1: 58	after BWV 857a	01008
857a	8.		Prelude and Fughetta (early WTC I No. 12)	F min.	Keyboard		V/6.1: 178	→ BWV 857	01009
858	8.	1722	Well-Tempered Clavier I, P. & F. No. 13	F♯ maj.	Keyboard	14: 48	V/6.1: 64	after BWV 858a	01010
858a	8.		Prelude and Fughetta (early WTC I No. 13)	F♯ maj.	Keyboard		V/6.1: 184	→ BWV 858	01011
859	8.	1722	Well-Tempered Clavier I, P. & F. No. 14	F♯ min.	Keyboard	14: 50	V/6.1: 64	after BWV 859a	01012
859a	8.		Prelude and Fughetta (early WTC I No. 14)	F♯ min.	Keyboard		V/6.1: 188	→ BWV 859	01013
860	8.	1722	Well-Tempered Clavier I, P. & F. No. 15	G maj.	Keyboard	14: 52	V/6.1: 72	after BWV 860a	01014
860a	8.		Prelude and Fughetta (early WTC I No. 15)	G maj.	Keyboard		V/6.1: 192	→ BWV 860	01015
861	8.	1722	Well-Tempered Clavier I, P. & F. No. 16	G min.	Keyboard	14: 57	V/6.1: 78	after BWV 861a	01016
861a	8.		Prelude and Fughetta (early WTC I No. 16)	G min.	Keyboard		V/6.1: 198	→ BWV 861	01017
862	8.	1722	Well-Tempered Clavier I, P. & F. No. 17	A♭ maj.	Keyboard	14: 60	V/6.1: 82	after BWV 862a	01018
862a	8.		Prelude and Fughetta (early WTC I No. 17)	A♭ maj.	Keyboard		V/6.1: 202	→ BWV 862	01019
863	8.	1722	Well-Tempered Clavier I, P. & F. No. 18	G♯ min.	Keyboard	14: 64	V/6.1: 86	after BWV 863a	01020
863a	8.		Prelude and Fughetta (early WTC I No. 18)	G♯ min.	Keyboard		V/6.1: 206	→ BWV 863	01021
864	8.	1722	Well-Tempered Clavier I, P. & F. No. 19	A maj.	Keyboard	14: 66	V/6.1: 90	after BWV 864a	01022
864a	8.		Prelude and Fughetta (early WTC I No. 19)	A maj.	Keyboard		V/6.1: 210	→ BWV 864	01023
865	8.	1722	Well-Tempered Clavier I, P. & F. No. 20	A min.	Keyboard	14: 70	V/6.1: 96	after BWV 865a	01024
865a	8.		Prelude and Fughetta (early WTC I No. 20)	A min.	Keyboard		V/6.1: 216	→ BWV 865	01025
866	8.	1722	Well-Tempered Clavier I, P. & F. No. 21	B♭ maj.	Keyboard	14: 74	V/6.1: 104	after BWV 866a	01026
866a	8.		Prelude and Fughetta (early WTC I No. 21)	B♭ maj.	Keyboard		V/6.1: 224	→ BWV 866	01027
867	8.	1722	Well-Tempered Clavier I, P. & F. No. 22	B♭ min.	Keyboard	14: 78	V/6.1: 108	after BWV 867a; → Hess 38	01028
867a	8.		Prelude and Fughetta (early WTC I No. 22)	B♭ min.	Keyboard		V/6.1: 228	→ BWV 867	01029
868	8.	1722	Well-Tempered Clavier I, P. & F. No. 23	B maj.	Keyboard	14: 82	V/6.1: 112	after BWV 868a	01030
868a	8.		Prelude and Fughetta (early WTC I No. 23)	B maj.	Keyboard		V/6.1: 232	→ BWV 868	01031
869	8.	1722	Well-Tempered Clavier I, P. & F. No. 24	B min.	Keyboard	14: 84	V/6.1: 116	after BWV 869a	01032
869a	8.		Prelude and Fughetta (early WTC I No. 24)	B min.	Keyboard		V/6.1: 236	→ BWV 869	01033
870b 870/2	8.	1739–1742	Well-Tempered Clavier II, P. & F. No. 1 (version A)	C maj.	Keyboard	45^{1}: 243; 14: 94	V/6.2: 2, 6, 342		01036
871	8.	1739–1742; 1744	Well-Tempered Clavier II, P. & F. No. 2	C min.	Keyboard	14: 96	V/6.2: 8, 160	→ K. 405/1	01037
872	8.	1739–1742; 1744	Well-Tempered Clavier II, P. & F. No. 3	C♯ maj.	Keyboard	14: 100	V/6.2: 12, 164, 352	after BWV 872a	01038
872a/1	8.	1739–1740	Prelude (early WTC II, P. & F. No. 3/1)	C maj.	Keyboard	14: 243	V/6.2: 344	→ BWV 872/1	01039
872a/2	8.	1738	Fughetta (early WTC II, P. & F. No. 3/2)	C maj.	Keyboard	36: 224	V/6.2: 358	→ BWV 872/2	01039
873	8.	1739–1742; 1744	Well-Tempered Clavier II, P. & F. No. 4	C♯ maj.	Keyboard	14: 104	V/6.2: 16, 168		01040
874	8.	1739–1742; 1744	Well-Tempered Clavier II, P. & F. No. 5	D maj.	Keyboard	14: 108	V/6.2: 24, 176	→ K. 405/5	01041
875	8.	1739–1742; 1744	Well-Tempered Clavier II, P. & F. No. 6	D min.	Keyboard	14: 112	V/6.2: 30; 182, 348, 356	after BWV 875a	01042
875a	8.	1739–1740	Preambulum (early WTC II, P. & F. No. 6/1)	D min.	Keyboard	36: 224	V/6.2: 346	→ BWV 875/1	01043
876	8.	1739–1742; 1744	Well-Tempered Clavier II, P. & F. No. 7	E♭ maj.	Keyboard	14: 116	V/6.2: 36, 188, 354	→ K. 405/2	01044
877	8.	1739–1742; 1744	Well-Tempered Clavier II, P. & F. No. 8	D♯ min.	Keyboard	14: 120	V/6.2: 42, 194	→ K. 405/4	01045
878	8.	1739–1742; 1744	Well-Tempered Clavier II, P. & F. No. 9	E maj.	Keyboard	14: 124	V/6.2: 48, 200	→ K. 405/3	01046
879	8.	1739–1742; 1744	Well-Tempered Clavier II, P. & F. No. 10	E min.	Keyboard	14: 128	V/6.2: 54, 206		01047
880	8.	1739–1742; 1744	Well-Tempered Clavier II, P. & F. No. 11	F maj.	Keyboard	14: 134	V/6.2: 62, 215		01048
881	8.	1739–1742; 1744	Well-Tempered Clavier II, P. & F. No. 12	F min.	Keyboard	14: 138	V/6.2: 69, 221		01049
882	8.	1739–1742; 1744	Well-Tempered Clavier II, P. & F. No. 13	F♯ maj.	Keyboard	14: 142	V/6.2: 76, 228	→ K. 404a/3	01050
883	8.	1739–1742; 1744	Well-Tempered Clavier II, P. & F. No. 14	F♯ min.	Keyboard	14: 146	V/6.2: 84, 236	→ K. 404a/2	01051
884	8.	1739–1742; 1744	Well-Tempered Clavier II, P. & F. No. 15	G maj.	Keyboard	14: 150	V/6.2: 90, 242, 350	after BWV 902/2	01052
885	8.	1739–1742; 1744	Well-Tempered Clavier II, P. & F. No. 16	G min.	Keyboard	14: 154	V/6.2: 94, 246		01053
886	8.	1739–1742; 1744	Well-Tempered Clavier II, P. & F. No. 17	A♭ maj.	Keyboard	14: 160	V/6.2: 100, 108, 252	after BWV 901/2	01054
887	8.	1739–1742; 1744	Well-Tempered Clavier II, P. & F. No. 18	G♯ min.	Keyboard	14: 166	V/6.2: 112, 260		01055
888	8.	1739–1742; 1744	Well-Tempered Clavier II, P. & F. No. 19	A maj.	Keyboard	14: 172	V/6.2: 120, 268		01056
889	8.	1739–1742; 1744	Well-Tempered Clavier II, P. & F. No. 20	A min.	Keyboard	14: 176	V/6.2: 124, 272		01057
890	8.	1739–1742; 1744	Well-Tempered Clavier II, P. & F. No. 21	B♭ maj.	Keyboard	14: 180	V/6.2: 128, 276		01058
891	8.	1739–1742; 1744	Well-Tempered Clavier II, P. & F. No. 22	B♭ min.	Keyboard	14: 186	V/6.2: 134, 282		01059
892	8.	1739–1742; 1744	Well-Tempered Clavier II, P. & F. No. 23	B maj.	Keyboard	14: 192	V/6.2: 142, 290		01060
893	8.	1739–1742; 1744	Well-Tempered Clavier II, P. & F. No. 24	B min.	Keyboard	14: 198	V/6.2: 150, 298		01061
870	8.	1744	Well-Tempered Clavier II, P. & F. No. 1 (version B)	C maj.	Keyboard	14: 91	V/6.2: 156	after BWV 870a	01034
894	8.	1710–1717 (JTK)	Prelude and Fugue	A min.	Keyboard	36: 91	V/9.2: 40	→ BWV 1044/1, /3; in SBB P 801, P 804	01062
895	8.	1709 (JCB)	Prelude and Fugue	A min.	Keyboard	36: 104	V/9.2: 69	in Yale LM 4982	01063
896	8.	1704–1707	Prelude and Fugue	A maj.	Keyboard	36: 157	V/9.2: 72	in Möllersche Handschrift	01064
870a	8.	before 1727	Prelude and Fughetta	C maj.	Keyboard	36: 224	V/6.2: 307, 310	→ BWV 870; in SBB P 804, P 1089	01035
899	8.	before 1727	Prelude and Fughetta	D min.	Keyboard	36: 106	V/6.2: 314; V/12: 24	in SBB P 804, P 1089	01068
900	8.	before 1727	Prelude and Fughetta	E min.	Keyboard	36: 108	V/6.2; V/12	in SBB P 804, P 1089	01069
901	8.	before 1727	Prelude and Fughetta	F maj.	Keyboard	36: 112	V/6.2: 324	→ BWV 886/2; in SBB P 1089	01070
902	8.	c.1729	Prelude and Fughetta	G maj.	Keyboard	36: 114	V/6.2: 328	→ BWV 884/2; in SBB P 804, P 1089	01071
902/1a	8.	before 1727	Prelude (previous Prelude to BWV 902/2)	G maj.	Keyboard	36: 220	V/6.2: 334, 338	→ BWV 884/2; in SBB P 804	01072
903	8.		Chromatic Fantasia and Fugue	D min.	Keyboard	36: 71	V/9.2: 76	after BWV 903a; in SBB P 803, P 651	01073
903a	8.		Fantasia (early BWV 903/1)	D min.	Keyboard	36: 219	V/9.2: 90	→ BWV 903/1; in D-DS Mus. ms. 69	01074
904	8.	before 1727	Fantasia and Fugue	A min.	Keyboard	36: 81	V/9.2	in SBB P 804	01075
906	8.	before 1729 c.1738	Fantasia and Fugue (Fugue incomplete)	C min.	Keyboard	36: 145, 238	V/9.2: 110	in US-BETbc, D-Dl Mus.2405-T-52	01077
910	8.	1707–1713	Toccata	F♯ min.	Kb (or) Org	3: 311	V/9.1: 1	in Andreas-Bach-Buch	01081
911	8.	1707–1713	Toccata	C min.	Kb (or) Org	3: 322	V/9.1: 13	in Andreas-Bach-Buch	01082
912	8.	1707–1713	Toccata	D maj.	Kb (or) Org	36: 26	V/9.1: 38	after BWV 912a; ↔ BWV 532/1	01083
912a	8.	1704–1707	Toccata	D maj.	Kb (or) Org	36: 218	V/9.1: 26	→ BWV 912; in Möllersche Handschrift	01084
913	8.	1707–1709	Toccata	D min.	Kb (or) Org	36: 36	V/9.1: 50, 63	after BWV 913a	01085
913a	8.		Toccata	D min.	Kb (or) Org		V/9.1: 52	→ BWV 913; publ. 1801	01086
914	8.	1707–1709	Toccata	E min.	Kb (or) Org	36: 47	V/9.1: 78		01087
915	8.	1707–1709	Toccata	G min.	Kb (or) Org	36: 54	V/9.1: 87		01088
916	8.	1707–1713	Toccata	G maj.	Kb (or) Org	36: 63	V/9.1: 100	in Andreas-Bach-Buch	01089
917	8.	1704–1707	Fantasia	G min.	Keyboard	36: 143	V/9.1: 14, 16	in Möllersche Handschrift	01090
918	8.		Fantasia on a Rondo	C min.	Keyboard	36: 148	V/9.1: 14, 18		01091
921	8.	1707–1713	Prelude	C min.	Keyboard	36: 136	V/9.1: 24	in Andreas-Bach-Buch	01094
922	8.	1710–1714 (JTK)	Prelude (Fantasia)	A min.	Keyboard	36: 138	V/9.2: 27, 34	in SBB P 803	01095
923	8.	c.1723?	Prelude	B min.	Keyboard	42: 211	V/9.2: 116	by Pachelbel, W. H.?; → BWV 923a; in SBB P 401	01096
924	8.	c.1720	Twelve Little Preludes No. 1: Preambulum (WFB No. 2)	C maj.	Keyboard	36: 118; 45^{1}: 214	V/5: 4	→ BWV 924a	01098
924a	8.	1720–1726	Twelve Little Preludes No. 1a: Preludium ex c♮ (WFB No. 26)	C maj.	Keyboard	36: 221; 45^{1}: 220	V/5: 41	after BWV 924; BR A44 F(add) 206	01099
925	8.	1720–1726	Twelve Little Preludes No. 4: Preludium ex d♮ (WFB No. 27)	D maj.	Keyboard	36: 121; 45^{1}: 220	V/5: 42	BR A45 F(add) 206	01100
926	8.	c.1720	Twelve Little Preludes No. 5: Preludium (WFB No. 4)	D min.	Keyboard	36: 122; 45^{1}: 214	V/5: 6		01101
927	8.	1720–1726	Twelve Little Preludes No. 8: Preambulum (WFB No. 8)	F maj.	Keyboard	36: 124; 45^{1}: 215	V/5: 10		01102
928	8.	1720–1726	Twelve Little Preludes No. 9: Preludium (WFB No. 10)	F maj.	Keyboard	36: 124; 45^{1}: 215	V/5: 14		01103
929	8.	1720–1726	Twelve Little Preludes No. 10: Trio for a Minuet by Stölzel (WFB No. 48^{e})	G min.	Keyboard	36: 126; 45^{1}: 226	V/5: 89	→ BWV 814a	01104
930	8.	1720–1726	Twelve Little Preludes No. 11: Preambulum (WFB No. 9)	G min.	Keyboard	36: 126; 45^{1}: 215	V/5: 12		01105
931	8.	1720–1726	Preludium, Klavierbüchlein WFB No. 29	A min.	Keyboard	36: 237; 45^{1}: 220	V/5: 45	BR A47 F(add) 206	01106
932	8.	1720–1726	Preludium ex e♭, Klavierbüchlein WFB No. 28 (incomplete)	E min.	Keyboard	36: 237; 45^{1}: 220	V/5: 44	BR A46 F(add) 206	01107
933	8.	1717–1723?	Six Little Preludes No. 1	C maj.	Keyboard	36: 128	V/9.2: 3	in SBB P 542, P 885	01108
934	8.	1717–1723?	Six Little Preludes No. 2	C min.	Keyboard	36: 128	V/9.2: 4	in SBB P 542, P 885	01109
935	8.	1717–1723?	Six Little Preludes No. 3	D min.	Keyboard	36: 130	V/9.2: 5	in SBB P 542, P 885	01110
936	8.	1717–1723?	Six Little Preludes No. 4	D maj.	Keyboard	36: 131	V/9.2: 6	in SBB P 542, P 885	01111
937	8.	1717–1723?	Six Little Preludes No. 5	E maj.	Keyboard	36: 132	V/9.2: 8	in SBB P 542, P 885	01112
938	8.	1717–1723?	Six Little Preludes No. 6	E min.	Keyboard	36: 133	V/9.2: 10	in SBB P 542, P 885	01113
939	8.	1726–1727	Five Little Preludes No. 1 (=12 L. P. No. 2)	C maj.	Keyboard	36: 119	V/12: 50	by Bach?; in SBB P 804	01114
940	8.	1726–1727	Five Little Preludes No. 2 (=12 L. P. No. 6)	D min.	Keyboard	36: 123	V/12: 50	by Bach?; in SBB P 804	01115
941	8.	1726–1727	Five Little Preludes No. 3 (=12 L. P. No. 7)	E min.	Keyboard	36: 123	V/12: 51	by Bach?; in SBB P 804	01116
942	8.	1726–1727	Five Little Preludes No. 4 (=12 L. P. No. 12)	A min.	Keyboard	36: 127	V/12: 52	by Bach?; in SBB P 804	01117
943	8.	1725–1727	Five Little Preludes No. 5	C maj.	Org (Kb?)	36: 134	V/12: 53	in SBB P 804	01118
944	8.	1707–1713	Fantasia and Fugue	A min.	Keyboard	3: 334	V/9.2: 133	in Andreas-Bach-Buch	01119
946	8.	early work?	Fugue on a theme by Albinoni	C maj.	Keyboard	36: 159	V/9.2: 153	after Albinoni, Op. 1, No. 12/4 (theme)	01121
947	8.	early work?	Fugue	A min.	Keyboard	36: 161	V/12: 55	by Bach?	01122
948	8.	early work?	Fugue	D min.	Keyboard	36: 164	V/9.2: 156	in D-B N. Mus. ms. 10580	01123
949	8.	1707–1713	Fugue	A maj.	Keyboard	36: 169	V/9.2: 163	after Albinoni (theme)?; in Andreas-Bach-Buch	01124
950	8.	before 1725	Fugue on a theme by Albinoni	A maj. G maj.	Keyboard	36: 173	V/9.2: 168	after Albinoni (theme); in SBB P 804	01125
951	8.	1714–1717	Fugue on a theme by Albinoni	B min.	Keyboard	36: 178	V/9.2: 118	after BWV 951a; in SBB P 801	01126
951a	8.	1714–1717	Fugue on a theme by Albinoni (early version)	B min.	Keyboard	36: 221	V/9.2: 127	after Albinoni (theme); → BWV 951; in D-LEm Poel. mus. Ms. 9	01127
952	8.		Fugue	C maj.	Keyboard	36: 184	V/9.2: 176		01128
953	8.	1720–1726	Fugue a 3, Klavierbüchlein WFB No. 31	C maj.	Keyboard	36: 186; 45^{1}: 220	V/5: 46		01129
954	8.	early work?	Fugue on a theme by Reincken	B♭ maj.	Keyboard	42: 50	V/11: 200	after Reincken, Hortus Musicus No. 2/2 (theme)	01130
955	8.	early work	Fugue	B♭ maj.	Keyboard	42: 55	V/12: 60	after BWV 955a; in SBB P 425, P 804	01131
955a	8.	early work	Fugue	B♭ maj.	Organ	42: 298	V/12: 65	by Erselius?; → BWV 955; in SBB P 247, P 595	01132
959	8.		Fugue	A min.	Keyboard	42: 208	V/9.2: 178	by Bach?	01136
961	8.	?	Fughetta	C min.	Keyboard	36: 154	V/9.2: 182	in SBB P 823	01138
963	8.	early work	Sonata for keyboard	D maj.	Keyboard	36: 19	V/10: 32	in SBB P 804	01140
965	8.	c.1714–1717 or earlier	Sonata for keyboard after Reincken	A min.	Keyboard	42: 29	V/11: 173	after Reincken, Hortus Musicus No. 1/1–/5; in SBB P 803	01142
966	8.	c.1714–1717 or earlier	Sonata for keyboard after Reincken	A min.	Keyboard	42: 42	V/11: 188	after Reincken, Hortus Musicus No. 3/1–/5; in SBB P 803	01143
967	8.	1704–1707	Sonata transcription, 1st movement	A min.	Keyboard	45^{1}: 168	V/9.2: 184	in SBB P 804	01144
971	8.	1733–1735	Italian Concerto (Clavier-Übung II No. 1)	F maj.	Harpsichord	3: 139	V/2: 2		01148
972	8.	July 1713– July 1714	Concerto for solo keyboard (1/16)	D maj.	Keyboard	42: 59	V/11: 3	after Vivaldi, Op. 3 No. 9	01149
972a	8.	July 1713– July 1714	Concerto for solo keyboard (1/16), early version	D maj.	Keyboard		V/11: 161	after Vivaldi, Op. 3 No. 9	01150
973	8.	July 1713– July 1714	Concerto for solo keyboard (2/16)	G maj.	Keyboard	42: 59	V/11: 12	after Vivaldi, Op. 7 No. 8	01151
974	8.	July 1713– July 1714	Concerto for solo keyboard (3/16)	D min.	Keyboard	42: 59	V/11: 20	after Marcello, A., Oboe Concerto	01152
975	8.	July 1713– July 1714	Concerto for solo keyboard (4/16)	G min.	Keyboard	42: 59	V/11: 30	after Vivaldi, Op. 4 No. 6	01153
976	8.	July 1713– July 1714	Concerto for solo keyboard (5/16)	C maj.	Keyboard	42: 59	V/11: 39	after Vivaldi, Op. 3 No. 12	01154
977	8.	July 1713– July 1714	Concerto for solo keyboard (6/16)	C maj.	Keyboard	42: 59	V/11: 50	after unknown model	01155
978	8.	July 1713– July 1714	Concerto for solo keyboard (7/16)	F maj.	Keyboard	42: 59	V/11: 56	after Vivaldi, Op. 3 No. 3 (RV 310)	01156
979	8.	July 1713– July 1714	Concerto for solo keyboard (8/16)	B min.	Keyboard	42: 59	V/11: 64	after Vivaldi, RV 813 (previously: Torelli)	01157
980	8.	July 1713– July 1714	Concerto for solo keyboard (9/16)	G maj.	Keyboard	42: 59	V/11: 79	after Vivaldi, Op. 4 No. 1 (RV 381)	01158
981	8.	July 1713– July 1714	Concerto for solo keyboard (10/16)	C min.	Keyboard	42: 59	V/11: 90	after Marcello, B., Op. 1 No. 2	01159
982	8.	July 1713– July 1714	Concerto for solo keyboard (11/16)	B♭ maj.	Keyboard	42: 59	V/11: 100	after J. E. of Saxe-Weimar, Op. 1 No. 1	01160
983	8.	July 1713– July 1714	Concerto for solo keyboard (12/16)	G min.	Keyboard	42: 59	V/11: 110	after unknown model	01161
984	8.	July 1713– July 1714	Concerto for solo keyboard (13/16)	C maj.	Keyboard	42: 59	V/11: 118	after J. E. of Saxe-Weimar, lost Concerto; → BWV 595	01162
985	8.	July 1713– July 1714	Concerto for solo keyboard (14/16)	G min.	Keyboard	42: 59	V/11: 128	after Telemann, TWV 51:g1	01163
986	8.	July 1713– July 1714	Concerto for solo keyboard (15/16)	G min.	Keyboard	42: 59	V/11: 137	after unknown model	01164
987	8.	July 1713– July 1714	Concerto for solo keyboard (16/16)	D min.	Keyboard	42: 59	V/11: 142	after J. E. of Saxe-Weimar, Op. 1 No. 4	01165
988	8.	1741–1742	Goldberg Variations (Clavier-Übung IV)	G maj.	Harpsichord	3: 263	V/2: 69	→ BWV 1087	01166
988/1	8.	c.1740? (AMB)	Notebook A. M. Bach (1725) No. 26 Aria of the Goldberg Variations	G maj.	Harpsichord	3: 263	V/4: 103	→ BWV 1087	01166
989	8.	1707–1713	Aria variata	A min.	Keyboard	36: 203	V/10: 21	in Andreas-Bach-Buch	01167
991	8.	1722	Notebook A. M. Bach (1722) No. 7 Air with variations (incomplete)	C min.	Keyboard	43^{2}: 4	V/4: 40		01169
992	8.	1704–1707	Capriccio on the departure of a beloved brother	B♭ maj.	Keyboard	36: 190	V/10: 3	in Möllersche Handschrift	01170
993	8.	c.1705	Capriccio in honorem Johann Christoph Bachii Ohrdrufiensis	E maj.	Keyboard	36: 197	V/10: 12	in SBB P 804	01171
994	8.	1720	Klavierbüchlein WFB No. 1: Applicatio	C maj.	Keyboard	36: 237; 45^{1}:214	V/5: 4		01172
**9.**	Lute compositions (see also: List of solo lute compositions by Johann Sebastian Bach)								Up ↑
995	9.	Fall 1727 – Winter 1731	Suite for lute	G min.	Lu		V/10: 81	after BWV 1011	01173
996	9.	1710–1717 (JGW)	Suite for lute	E min.	Lu (Lw?)	45^{1}: 149	V/10: 94	in SBB P 801, pp. 385–395	01174
997.1	9.	1720–1739	Suite (1st version)	C min.	Lw	45^{1}: 156	V/10: 102	in SBB P 650; → BWV 997.2	01175
997.2	9.	1720–1739	Suite (2nd version)	C min.	Lu	45^{1}: 156	V/10: 102	in D LEm III 11.5; after BWV 997.1	11576
998	9.	1735–1745	Prelude, Fugue and Allegro	E♭ maj.	Lu (or) Hc	45^{1}: 141	V/10: 114		01176
999	9.	1717–1723	Prelude for lute (Twelve Little Preludes No. 3)	C min.	Lu	36: 119	V/10: 122	in SBB P 804, pp. 101–103	01177
1000	9.	after 1720	Fugue	G min.	Lu		V/10: 124	after BWV 1001/2; → 539/2; in MB Lpz III.11.4	01178
1006.2	9.	c.1736–1737	Suite	E maj.	Lu?	42: 16	V/10: 134	after BWV 1006.1	01185
**10.**	Chamber music (see also: List of chamber music works by Johann Sebastian Bach)								Up ↑
1001	10.	1720	Sonatas and partitas for solo violin No. 1: Sonata No. 1	G minor	Vl	27^{1}: 3	VI/1: 3 rev 3: 3	→ BWV 1000, 539/2	01179
1002	10.	1720	Partitas and sonatas for solo violin No. 2: Partita No. 1	B minor	Vl	27^{1}: 3	VI/1: 10 rev 3: 10		01180
1003	10.	1720	Sonatas and partitas for solo violin No. 3: Sonata No. 2	A minor	Vl	27^{1}: 3	VI/1: 20 rev 3: 20	→ BWV 964	01181
1004	10.	1720	Partitas and sonatas for solo violin No. 4: Partita No. 2	D minor	Vl	27^{1}: 3	VI/1: 30 rev 3: 30		01182
1005	10.	1720	Sonatas and partitas for solo violin No. 5: Sonata No. 3	C major	Vl	27^{1}: 3	VI/1: 42 rev 3: 42	after "Komm, Heiliger Geist, Herre Gott"; → BWV 968	01183
1006.1	10.	1720	Partitas and sonatas for solo violin No. 6: Partita No. 3	E major	Vl	27^{1}: 3	VI/1: 54 rev 3: 54	→ BWV 1006.2, 29/1 and 120a/4	01184
1007	10.	1720 (AMB)	Suite for cello No. 1	G major	Vc	27^{1}: 59	VI/2: 2		01186
1008	10.	1720 (AMB)	Suite for cello No. 2	D minor	Vc	27^{1}: 59	VI/2: 8		01187
1009	10.	1720 (AMB)	Suite for cello No. 3	C major	Vc	27^{1}: 59	VI/2:14		01188
1010	10.	1720 (AMB)	Suite for cello No. 4	E♭ major	Vc	27^{1}: 59	VI/2: 22		01189
1011	10.	1720 (AMB)	Suite for cello No. 5	C minor	Vc	27^{1}: 59	VI/2: 32	→ BWV 995	01190
1012	10.	1720 (AMB)	Suite for cello No. 6	D major	Vc	27^{1}: 59	VI/2:40		01191
1013	10.	1717–1723?	Partita for flute	A minor	Fl		VI/3: 3		01192
1014	10.	1717–1723?	Sonata for violin and harpsichord No. 1	B minor	Vl Hc	9: 69	VI/1: 83 rev 3: 83		01193
1015	10.	1717–1723?	Sonata for violin and harpsichord No. 2	A major	Vl Hc	9: 84	VI/1: 99 rev 3: 99		01194
1016	10.	1717–1723?	Sonata for violin and harpsichord No. 3	E major	Vl Hc	9: 98	VI/1: 115 rev 3: 115		01195
1017	10.	1717–1723?	Sonata for violin and harpsichord No. 4	C minor	Vl Hc	9: 120	VI/1: 136 rev 3: 136		01196
1018.2	10.	1717–1723?	Sonata for violin and harpsichord No. 5	F minor	Vl Hc	9: 136	VI/1: 153 rev 3: 153	after BWV 1018.1	01197
1018.1	10.	1717–1723?	Adagio, early version of BWV 1018/3	F minor	Vl Hc	9: 250	VI/1: 195 rev 3: 194	→ BWV 1018.2/3	01198
1019.3	10.	after 1729?	Sonata for violin and harpsichord No. 6	G major	Vl Hc	9: 154	VI/1: 172 rev 3: 172	after BWV 1019.2	01200
1019.1	10.	1725	Sonata for violin and harpsichord No. 6, early version 1 (partially lost)	G major	Vl Hc	9: 252	VI/1: 197 rev 3: 196	→ BWV 830/3, /6, 1019.2	01199
1019.2	10.	c. 1730–1731	Sonata for violin and harpsichord No. 6, early version 2	G major	Vl Hc	9: 252	VI/1: 197 rev 3: 218	after BWV 1019.1, 120.1/4; → BWV 1019.3	11577
1021	10.	1732–1733	Sonata for violin and continuo	G major	Vl Bc		VI/1: 65 rev 3: 65	→ BWV 1022, 1038	01202
1023	10.	c.1714–1717?	Sonata for violin and continuo	E minor	Vl Bc	43^{1}: 31	VI/1: 73 rev 3: 73		01204
1025.1	10.	after 1739?	Suite for violin and keyboard	A major	Vl Kb	9: 43	VI/5: 67	after Weiss; → BWV 1025.2	11578
1025.2	10.	c. 1746–1747?	Suite for violin and keyboard (incomplete)	A major	Vl Kb	9: 43	VI/5: 97	after BWV 1025.1	01206
1026	10.	c.1714–1717	Fugue for violin and continuo	G minor	Vl Bc	43^{1}: 39	VI/5: 59		01207
1027	10.	c.1742	Sonata for gamba and harpsichord No. 1	G major	Gam Hc	9: 175	VI/4: 3	after BWV 1039; → 1027/1a /2a /4a	01208
1028	10.		Sonata for gamba and harpsichord No. 2	D major	Gam Hc	9: 175	VI/4: 21		01210
1029	10.		Sonata for gamba and harpsichord No. 3	G minor	Gam Hc	9: 175	VI/4: 36	→ BWV 545b	01211
1030.2	10.	1736–1737	Sonata for flute and harpsichord	B minor	Fl Hc	9: 3	VI/3: 33	after BWV 1030.1	11579
1030.1	10.	1717–1736	Sonata for unknown instrument and harpsichord	G minor	v Hc		VI/3: 89	→ BWV 1030.2	01212
1032	10.	1736–1737	Sonata for flute and harpsichord (/1 incomplete)	A major	Fl Hc	9: 32, 245	VI/3: 54	→ BWV 525a	01214
1034	10.	after 1723	Sonata for flute and continuo	E minor	Fl Bc	43^{1}: 9	VI/3: 11		01216
1035	10.	1740s	Sonata for flute and continuo	E major	Fl Bc	43^{1}: 21	VI/3: 23		01217
1039	10.	1708–1726	Sonata	G major	2Fl Bc	9: 260	VI/3: 71	→ BWV 1027	01221
**11.**	Works for orchestra (see also: List of orchestral works by Johann Sebastian Bach)								Up ↑
1041	11.	1730	Concerto for violin and orchestra No. 1	A min.	**Vl** Str Bc	21^{1}: 3; 45^{1}: 233	VII/3: 3	→ BWV 1058	01223
1042	11.		Concerto for violin and orchestra No. 2	E maj.	**Vl** Str Bc	21^{1}: 21	VII/3: 35	→ BWV 1054	01224
1043	11.	1730–1731 or earlier	Concerto for 2 violins and orchestra – Double Concerto	D min.	**2Vl** Str Bc	21^{1}: 41	VII/3: 71	→ BWV 1062	01225
1044	11.	1727 or later	Concerto for flute, violin, harpsichord and orchestra – Triple Concerto	A min.	**Fl Vl Hc** Str Bc	17: 223	VII/3: 105	after BWV 894/1, 527/2, 894/2	01226
1045	11.	1743–1746	Cantata opening: "Concerto" (Symphonic movement for violin and orchestra)	D maj.	**Vl** 3Tr Tmp 2Ob Str Bc	21^{1}: 65	I/34: 305	after unknown model by other composer?	01227
1046.2	11.	1721-03-24	Brandenburg Concerto No. 1	F maj.	2Nho 3Ob Bas Vlp Str Bc	19: 3	VII/2: 3	after BWV 1046.1; /3, /7 → BWV 207(a)/1, /5a	01228
1046.1	11.	c.1712- 1713?	Sinfonia (opening of BWV 208?)	F maj.	2Nho 3Ob Str Bas Bc	31^{1}: 69	VII/2: 225	→ BWV 1046.2; /1 → BWV 52/1; was BWV 1046a, 1071	01229
1047	11.	1721-03-24	Brandenburg Concerto No. 2	F maj.	Tr Fl Ob Vl Str Vne Bc	19: 3	VII/2: 43		01230
1048	11.	1721-03-24	Brandenburg Concerto No. 3	G maj.	3Vl 3Vla 3Vc Vne Hc	19: 3	VII/2: 73	→ BWV 174/1	01231
1049	11.	1721-03-24	Brandenburg Concerto No. 4	G maj.	Vl 2Fl Str Vc Vne Bc	19: 3	VII/2: 99	→ BWV 1057	01232
1050.2	11.	1721-03-24	Brandenburg Concerto No. 5 (early version)	D maj.	**Fl Vl Hc** Vl Va Vc Vne	19: 3	VII/2: 145	after BWV 1050.1	01233
1050.1	11.	1720–1721	Brandenburg Concerto No. 5 (revised version)	D maj.	**Fl Vl Hc** Vl Va Vne	19: 3	VII/2: 145	→ BWV 1050.2	01234
1051	11.	1721-03-24	Brandenburg Concerto No. 6	B♭ maj.	2Vla 2Gam Vc Vne Hc	19: 3	VII/2: 197		01235
1052.2	11.	c.1738	Concerto for harpsichord and orchestra No. 1 (revised version)	D min.	**Hc** Str Bc	17: 3	VII/4: 3	after BWV 1052.1, BWV 146/1, /2 and 188/1	01236
1052.1	11.	before 1726	Concerto for harpsichord and orchestra No. 1 (early version)	D min.	**Hc** Str Bc	17: 3	VII/4: 317	by Bach, C. P. E.?; → BWV 1052.2, BWV 146/1, /2 and 188/1	01237
1053	11.	c.1738	Concerto for harpsichord and orchestra No. 2	E maj.	**Hc** Str Bc	17: 3	VII/4: 79	after BWV 169/1, /5 and 49/1	01238
1054	11.	c.1738	Concerto for harpsichord and orchestra No. 3	D maj.	**Hc** Str Bc	17: 3	VII/4: 127	after BWV 1042	01239
1055	11.	c.1738	Concerto for harpsichord and orchestra No. 4	A maj.	**Hc** Str Bc	17: 3	VII/4: 161	after BWV 1055R?	01240
1056	11.	c.1738	Concerto for harpsichord and orchestra No. 5	F min.	**Hc** Str Bc	17: 3	VII/4: 197	after BWV 1056R?; /2 after BWV 156/1	01241
1057	11.	c.1738	Concerto for harpsichord and orchestra No. 6	F maj.	**Hc** 2Fl Str Bc	17: 3	VII/4: 221	after BWV 1049	01242
1058	11.	c.1738	Concerto for harpsichord and orchestra No. 7	G min.	**Hc** Str Bc	17: 3	VII/4: 283	after BWV 1041	01243
1059	11.	c.1738	Concerto for harpsichord and orchestra No. 8 (abandoned fragment of 1st movement)	D min.	**Hc** Ob Str Bc	17: 3	VII/4: 313	after BWV 35/1 and earlier model (for oboe?); completions/ reconstructions usually based on BWV 35/1, /2 and /5	01244
1060	11.	c.1736	Concerto for 2 harpsichords and orchestra No. 1	C min.	**2Hc** Str Bc	21^{2}: 3	VII/5: 3	after BWV 1060R?	01245
1061.2	11.	after 1732–1733	Concerto for 2 harpsichords and orchestra No. 2	C maj.	**2Hc** Str Bc	21^{2}: 39	VII/5: 109	after BWV 1061.1	01246
1061.1	11.	1732–1733 or earlier	Concerto for 2 harpsichords (No. 2)	C maj.	**2Hc**	21^{2}: 39	VII/5: 83	→ BWV 1061.2	01247
1062	11.	1736	Concerto for 2 harpsichords and orchestra No. 3	C min.	**2Hc** Str Bc	21^{2}: 83	VII/5: 43	after BWV 1043	01248
1063	11.	c.1730	Concerto for 3 harpsichords and orchestra No. 1	D min.	**3Hc** Str Bc	31^{3}: 3	VII/6: 3	after unknown model?	01249
1064	11.	c.1730	Concerto for 3 harpsichords and orchestra No. 2	C maj.	**3Hc** Str Bc	31^{3}: 53	VII/6: 55	after BWV 1064R?	01250
1065	11.	c.1730	Concerto for 4 harpsichords and orchestra	A min.	**4Hc** Str Bc	43^{1}: 71	VII/6: 117	after Vivaldi, Op. 3 No. 10	01251
1066	11.	May 1724–End 1725	Orchestral Suite No. 1	C maj.	2Ob Bas Str Bc	31^{1}: 3	VII/1: 3	Ouverture Courante 2Gavotte Forlane 2Minuet 2Bourrée 2Passepied	01252
1067	11.	1738–1739	Orchestral Suite No. 2	B min.	Fl Str Bc	31^{1}: 24	VII/1: 27	Ouverture Rondeau Sarabande 2Bourrée 2Polonaise Minuet Badinerie	01253
1068	11.	c.1730	Orchestral Suite No. 3	D maj.	3Tr Tmp 2Ob (Vl) Str Bc	31^{1}: 40	VII/1: 49, 119	Ouverture Air 2Gavotte Bourrée Gigue	01254
1069	11.	before late 1727	Orchestral Suite No. 4	D maj.	3Tr Tmp 2Ob Bas Str Bc	31^{1}: 66	VII/1: 79	Ouverture 2Bourrée Gavotte 2Minuet Réjouissance; /1 → BWV 110/1	01255
1071								see BWV 1046.1	01229
**12.**	Canons (see also: List of canons by Johann Sebastian Bach)								Up ↑
1072	12.		Canon trias harmonica a 8	D maj.	8V	45^{1}: 131	VIII/1: 3, 6		01258
1073	12.	1713-08-02	Canon â 4. Voc: perpetuus	A min.	4V	45^{1}: 132	VIII/1: 3	in US-CAh bMS Eng 870 (35b)	01259
1074	12.	1727	Canon a 4 (for Ludwig Friedrich Hudemann)	A min.	4V	45^{1}: 134	VIII/1: 3		01260
1075	12.	1734-01-10	Canon a 2. perpetuus	D maj.	2V		VIII/1: 3		01261
1076	12.	1746	Canon triplex a 6	G maj.	6V	45^{1}: 138	VIII/1: 3	after BWV 1087/13	01262
1077	12.	1747-10-15	Canone doppio sopr' il soggetto (dedicated to Johann Fulde)	G maj.	4V Bc		VIII/1: 4 IX/2: 81	after BWV 1087/11	01263
1078	12.	1749-03-01	Canon Fa Mi, et Mi Fa est Tota Musica, a.k.a. Canon super Fa Mi, a 7. post Tempus Musicum	F maj.	7V Bc	45^{1}: 136	VIII/1: 4	in SBB P 611	01264
1086	12.	1750?	Canon Concordia discors	D maj.	2V		VIII/1: 4 III/1: VIII	in SLB Dresden R 291^{s}	01272
1087	12.	1747/1748 or earlier	14 Canons on the first eight notes of the Goldberg ground	G maj.	6V		V/2: 119	after BWV 988/1; /11 → BWV 1077; /13 → 1076; in BN Paris Ms. 17669, Bl. 18v	01273
**13.**	Musical Offering, Art of the Fugue (see also: List of late contrapuntal works by Johann Sebastian Bach)								Up ↑
1079	13.	1747-07-07	Musical Offering		Kb Fl 2Vl Bc	31^{2}	VIII/1: 46		01265
1080.1	13.	1742–1749	The Art of Fugue (autograph)		Hc (?)	25^{1}	VIII/2.1	→ BWV 1080.2	01266
1080.2	13.	c. 1747–1748	The Art of Fugue (print version)		Hc (?)	47	VIII/2.2	after BWV 1080.1	11581
**Later**	Later additions to the main catalogue (above BWV 1128: BWV^{3})								Up ↑
1127		1713-10-30	aria "Alles mit Gott und nichts ohn' ihn"	C maj.	s Str Bc		Sppl: 237	text by Mylius	01307
1128	II	1707–1708	chorale setting "Wo Gott der Herr nicht bei uns hält"	G min.	Organ		IV/10	after Z 4441a; was BWV Anh. 71	01725
1129		c. 1742–1745	music theory Theoretische Aufzeichnungen zum fünfstimmigen Satz				Sppl: 63		11582
1130		c. 1742–1743	music theory Theoretische Aufzeichnungen zum Kontrapunkt				Sppl: 45		11583
1131		c. 1743–1746	music theory Regeln zum Gebrauch von Synkopen im doppelten Kontrapunkt				Sppl: 41		11584
1132		c. 1736–1739	Counterpoint studies with W. F. Bach				Sppl: 67		11585
1133		c. 1740–1745	thorough-bass rules I Einige höchst nöthige Regeln vom General Basse				V/4: 131; Sppl: 37		11586
1134		1738?	thorough-bass rules II Precepts and Principles For Playing the Thorough-Bass or Accompanying in Four Parts				Sppl: 3		11587
1135	I	1724-03-25	Cantata Siehe, eine Jungfrau ist schwanger (25 March: Annunciation)					was BWV Anh. 199; text extant	01510
1136	I	1708–1717? 1725-09-09? 1727-02-06	Cantata Liebster Gott, vergißt du mich (1711: libretto for Trin. VII; 1725: Trin. XV?; 1727, with BWV 157.1: funeral in Pomßen)					was BWV Anh. 209; text by Lehms	01520
1137	I	1729-10-23?	Cantata (sketch: Gott, du Richter der Gedanken for Trinity XIX by Picander?)		SATB Vl Str Bc		III/1	was BWV Anh. 2; in SBB P 36: 18	01309
1138.1	I	1709-02-04	Cantata for Ratswahl in Mühlhausen No. 2					was BWV Anh. 192	01503
1138.2		1710-02-04	Cantata for Ratswahl in Mühlhausen No. 3					lost	11382
1139.1	I	1725-08-27	Cantata Wünschet Jerusalem Glück (council election)					was BWV Anh. 4; text by Picander; → BWV 1139.2	01311
1139.2	I	1730-06-27	Cantata Wünschet Jerusalem Glück (200th anniversary of the Augsburg Confession)					was BWV Anh. 4a; text by Picander; after BWV 1139.1	01312
1140	I	1730-08-25	Cantata Gott, gib dein Gerichte dem Könige (council election)				I/32.2	was BWV Anh. 3; text by Picander	01310
1141	I	1740-08-29	Cantata Herrscher des Himmels, König der Ehren (council election)				I/32.2	was BWV Anh. 193; text extant; /7 after BWV 208/15?	01504
1142		1716-04-02	Cantata Was ist, das wir Leben nennen (funeral service for Johann Ernst of S.-W.)					text extant	01531
1143	4.	1729-03-24	Cantata Klagt, Kinder, klagt es aller Welt (funeral of Leopold of Anhalt-Köthen; music lost but partially reconstructible)				I/34	was BWV 244a; text by Picander; ↔ BWV 198/1, /10, 244b/6, /8, /39, /49, /57, /23, /20, /65, /13, /68	00305
1144	I	1725-02-12	Cantata Sein Segen fließt daher wie ein Strom (wedding)					was BWV Anh. 14; text extant	01322
1145	I	1729-01-18	Cantata Der Herr ist freundlich dem, der auf ihn harret (wedding)					was BWV Anh. 211; text by Picander	01522
1146	I	1729-07-26	Cantata Vergnügende Flammen, verdoppelt die Macht (wedding)					was BWV Anh. 212; text by Picander	01523
1147	I	1718-12-10	Cantata Lobet den Herrn, alle seine Heerscharen (birthday of Leopold of A.-K.)				I/34	was BWV Anh. 5; text by Hunold	01313
1148	I	1724-04-27	Cantata Siehe, der Hüter Israel (doctorate)		SATB 3Tr Tmp 2Ob 3Vl Va Bc		I/34	was BWV Anh. 15; lost	01323
1150	I	1721-01-01? 1722-01-01?	Cantata Ihr wallenden Wolken (New Year)		b 2Fl Str Vc Hc Bc		I/4	was BWV Anh. 197; lost	01508
1151	I	1720-01-01	Secular cantata Dich loben die lieblichen Strahlen der Sonne (New Year)				I/35	was BWV Anh. 6; text by Hunold	01314
1152	I	1723-01-01	Secular cantata for New Year (congratulation of Leopold of Anhalt-Köthen and his wife Frederica Henriette)				I/35	was BWV Anh. 8; lost	01316
1153	I	1720-12-10	Secular cantata Heut ist gewiß ein guter Tag (birthday of Leopold of Anhalt-Köthen)				I/35	was BWV Anh. 7; text by Hunold	01315
1154	I	1722-07-29	Cantata O vergnügte Stunden (birthday of John Augustus of Anhalt-Zerbst)					was BWV Anh. 194; text extant	01505
1155	I	1723-08-09	Ode in Latin (birthday of Frederick II of Saxe-Gotha)				I/38	was BWV Anh. 20; lost	01328
1156	I	1727-05-12	Secular cantata Entfernet euch, ihr heitern Sterne (57th birthday of Augustus II)				I/36	was BWV Anh. 9; text by Haupt, C. F.; /1 → BWV 232^{II}/6?	01317
1157	I	1732-08-03	Secular cantata Es lebe der König, der Vater im Lande (name day of Augustus II)				I/36	was BWV Anh. 11; text by Picander; /1 & /11 → BWV 215/1 → 232^{IV}/1=/3; /7 → 248/39?; /9 → 212/14	01319
1158	I	1733-08-03	Secular cantata Frohes Volk, vergnügte Sachsen (name day of Augustus III)				I/36	was BWV Anh. 12; text by Picander; after BWV Anh. 18; /1 → BWV 11/1	01320
1159		1739-10-07	Secular cantata "Serenade" (birthday of Augustus III)					lost	01536
1160	I	1731-08-25	Secular cantata So kämpfet nur, ihr muntern Töne (birthday of Joachim Friedrich von Flemming)				I/39	was BWV Anh. 10; text by Picander; /1 → BWV 248^{VIa}/1?	01318
1161	I	1738-04-28	Secular cantata Willkommen! Ihr herrschenden Götter der Erden in honour of the royal couple (Augustus III and Maria Josepha), and for the forthcoming marriage of princess Maria Amalia with Charles of Sicily				I/37	was BWV Anh. 13; text by Gottsched, J. C. in Riemersche Chronik	01321
1162	I	1732-06-05	Secular cantata Froher Tag, verlangte Stunden (inauguration of St. Thomas school after renovation)				I/39	was BWV Anh. 18; text by Winckler; /1 → BWV 11/1; /1 /3 /5 /6 /8 /10 → BWV Anh. 12	01326
1163	I	1725-11-27	Secular cantata Auf, süß entzückende Gewalt (wedding of Peter, eldest son of Peter Hohmann, and Christiana Sibylla Mencke)				I/40	was BWV Anh. 196; text by Gottsched, C.; /3 → BWV 11/4 → 232^{IV}/4; /5 → BWV 11/8	01507
1164	II	1712–1713 or earlier	Motet Ich lasse dich nicht, du segnest mich denn	F min.	2SATB	39: 157	III/3: 3	by Bach, J. Christoph?; was BWV Anh. 159; ↔ BWV 421 (/2)	01470
1177		1726-12-11	March	D maj.	3Tr Tmp 2Fl 2Ob Str Bc			Introduction for BWV 207	011891
1178			Chaconne and Fugue	D min.	Organ			Composed during his pre–Weimar period; found as a copy in a pupil's hand along with BWV 1179	011965
1179			Chaconne	G min.	Organ			See BWV 1178	011966
**R**	Reconstructions (see also Reconstruction of music by Johann Sebastian Bach)								Up ↑
1052R	R	1970	Concerto	D min.	**Vl** Str Bc		VII/7: 3	by Fischer; after BWV 1052	01236
1055R	R	1970	Concerto	A maj.	**Oba** Str Bc		VII/7: 33	by Fischer; after BWV 1055	01240
1056R	R	1970	Concerto	G min.	**Vl** Str Bc		VII/7: 59	by Fischer; after BWV 1056	01241
1060R	R	1970	Concerto	C min.	**Vl** **Ob** Str Bc		VII/7: 75	by Fischer; after BWV 1060	01245
1064R	R	1970	Concerto	D maj.	**3Vl** Str Bc		VII/7: 103	by Fischer; after BWV 1064	01250
**Anh. I**	Fragments – lost works								Up ↑
I 1	I	1725-07-15?	Cantata Gesegnet ist die Zuversicht (Trinity VII)		SATB 2Fl Str Bc			by Telemann (TWV 1:617)?; text by Neumeister?	01308
I 2	I							see BWV 1137	01309
I 3	I							see BWV 1140	01310
I 4	I							see BWV 1139.1	01311
I 4a	I							see BWV 1139.2	01312
I 5	I							see BWV 1147	01313
I 6	I							see BWV 1151	01314
I 7	I							see BWV 1153	01315
I 8	I							see BWV 1152	01316
I 9	I							see BWV 1156	01317
I 10	I							see BWV 1160	01318
I 11	I							see BWV 1157	01319
I 12	I							see BWV 1158	01320
I 13	I							see BWV 1161	01321
I 14	I							see BWV 1144	01322
I 15	I							see BWV 1148	01323
I 16	I	1735-11-09	Cantata Schließt die Gruft! ihr Trauerglocken (mourning of Hedwig of Merseburg)					by Roemhildt; text by Hoffmann, B.	01324
I 17	I		Cantata Mein Gott, nimm die gerechte Seele (funeral)		SATB 2Oba Str Bas Bc		I/33		01325
I 18	I							see BWV 1162	01326
I 19	I	1734-11-21	Secular cantata Thomana saß annoch betrübt (welcome to Johann August Ernesti as new rector of St. Thomas school)				I/39	text by Landvoigt?	01327
I 20	I							see BWV 1155	01328
N 190	I	1729-04-18	Cantata Ich bin ein Pilgrim auf der Welt (Easter 2)		b Bc ...		I/33	by Bach, C. P. E.?; text by Picander	01501
N 191	I	1715-05-19	Cantata Leb ich oder leb ich nicht (Cantate)					text by Franck, S.	01502
N 192	I							see BWV 1138.1	01503
N 193	I							see BWV 1141	01504
N 194	I							see BWV 1154	01505
N 195	I	1723-06-09	Secular cantata Murmelt nur, ihr heitern Bäche (celebration of Johann Florenz Rivinus)					text in Acta Lipsiensium 1723, Vol. 5, pp. 515–619	01506
N 196	I							see BWV 1163	01507
N 197	I							see BWV 1150	01508
N 198	I							see BWV 149/1a	01509
N 199	I							see BWV 1135	01510
N 200	I	c.1740	chorale setting "O Traurigkeit, o Herzeleid" (unused sketch for Orgelbüchlein)		Organ		IV/1: 46	after Z 1915; in SBB P 283	01511
N 209	I							see BWV 1136	01520
N 210	I	1734-10-04	Cantata Wo sind meine Wunderwerke (leave-taking of Johann Matthias Gesner)					text in 2° Poet. Germ. I, 6425: 4 Rara; /1 → BWV 193a/7, 193/3?	01521
N 211	I							see BWV 1145	01522
N 212	I							see BWV 1146	01523
N 213	I		Concerto	F maj.	Org			by Telemann; arr. by Bach	01524
223	I	1717–1718?	Cantata Meine Seele soll Gott loben	B♭ maj.			I/34	by Handel?	00280
224	I	1732	Aria "Reißt euch los, bekränkte Sinnen" (fragment)		S		I/41	by Bach, C. P. E.?; in SBB P 491	00281
**Anh. II**	Works of doubtful authenticity								Up ↑
53	II		Aria "Schlage doch, gewünschte Stunde" (Funeral)	E maj.	a Bel Str Bc	12^{2}: 53	I/41	by Hoffmann, M.?	00068
142	II		Cantata Uns ist ein Kind geboren (Christmas)	A min.	atbSATB 2Fl 2Ob Str Bc	30: 19	I/41	text by Neumeister (reworked)	00174
189	II		Cantata Meine Seele rühmt und preist (German Magnificat, Visitation)	B♭ maj.	t Fl Ob Vl Bc	37: 213	I/41	by Hoffmann, M.	00229
217	II		Cantata Gedenke, Herr, wie es uns gehet (Epiphany I)		satbSATB Fl Str Bc	41: 207	I/41	by Altnickol?	00274
220	II		Cantata Lobt ihn mit Herz und Munde (24 June: feast of John the Baptist)		atbSATB Fl 2Ob Str Bc	41: 259	I/41		00277
221	II		Cantata Wer sucht die Pracht, wer wünscht den Glanz		tb 2Vl Bas Vc Org		I/41	in SBB P 191: 83–113	00278
III 159	II							see BWV 1164	01470
II 25	II	1740–1742 (JSB)	Kyrie–Gloria Mass	C maj.	SATB 2Tr 2Vl Org	11^{1}: XVI	II/9	by Bach, J. L.?	01333
239	II	1738–1741 (JSB)	Sanctus	D min.	SATB Str Bc	11^{1}: 89	II/9	after Caldara, Missa Providentiae/4	00298
II 28	II		Sanctus	B♭ maj.	SATB 2Ob 2Cor Str Bc	11^{1}: XVII	II/9		01336
II 29	II	c.1714–17	Kyrie–Gloria Mass (only cello part extant)	C min.			II/9	in BKraków St 547	01337
III 167	II	1738–1739 (JSB)	Kyrie–Gloria Mass for two choirs	G maj.	3SATB 3Ob Tai 2Vl 2Va 2Vne Bc Org		II/9	by Bernhard, Krieger or Pohle?; in SBB P 659	01478
II 30	II	1690s (Tor.) c.1742 (JSB)	Magnificat for double choir	C maj.	2SATB 3Tr Tmp 2Vl 2Vla Bc	11^{1}: XV	II/9	after Torri, Magnificat; Tr3, Tmp by Bach	01338
246	II	1732-04-11 (JSB)	Passion St Luke Passion		ssatbSATB 2Fl 2Ob Tai Bas Str Bc	45^{2}	II/9: 65	→ BWV 246/40a; in SBB P 1017	00311
II 31	II		chorale setting "Herr Gott, dich loben alle wir"		SATB 2Tr 3Ob Str Bc			in SBB P 101	01339
N 201	II		chorale setting "Du Friedefürst, Herr Jesu Christ"		SATB			by Vetter, D.	01512
N 202	II		chorale setting "Gott hat das Evangelium"		SATB			by Vetter, D.	01513
N 203	II		chorale setting "Ich hebe meine Augen auf"		SATB			by Vetter, D.	01514
N 204	II		chorale setting "O Traurigkeit, o Herzeleid"		SATB			by Vetter, D.	01515
II 32	II	1704	Sieben geistliche Oden und ein Gedicht No. 1 "Getrost mein Geist, wenn Wind und Wetter krachen"		Voice Bc			in Deutsche Übersetzungen und Gedichte	01340
II 33	II	1704	Sieben geistliche Oden und ein Gedicht No. 2 "Mein Jesus, spare nicht"		Voice Bc			in Deutsche Übersetzungen und Gedichte	01341
II 34	II	1704	Sieben geistliche Oden und ein Gedicht No. 3 "Kann ich mit einem Tone"		Voice Bc			in Deutsche Übersetzungen und Gedichte	01342
II 35	II	1704	Sieben geistliche Oden und ein Gedicht No. 4 "Meine Seele lass die Flügel"		Voice Bc			in Deutsche Übersetzungen und Gedichte	01343
II 36	II	1704	Sieben geistliche Oden und ein Gedicht No. 5 "Ich stimm' itzund ein Straff-Lied an"		Voice Bc			in Deutsche Übersetzungen und Gedichte	01344
II 37	II	1704	Sieben geistliche Oden und ein Gedicht No. 6 "Der schwarze Flügel trüber Nacht"		Voice Bc			in Deutsche Übersetzungen und Gedichte	01345
II 38	II	1704	Sieben geistliche Oden und ein Gedicht No. 7 "Das Finsterniß tritt ein"		Voice Bc			in Deutsche Übersetzungen und Gedichte	01346
II 39	II	1704	Sieben geistliche Oden und ein Gedicht No. 8 "Ach was wollt ihr trüben Sinnen"		Voice Bc			in Deutsche Übersetzungen und Gedichte	01347
II 40	II	1736	Song "Ich bin nun wie ich bin"		Voice Kb			in Singende Muse an der Pleiße	01348
II 41	II	1736	Song "Dir zu Liebe, wertes Herze"		Voice Kb			in Singende Muse an der Pleiße	01349
571	II	c. 1704	Fantasia, a.k.a. Concerto	G maj.	Organ	38: 67	IV/11: 35		00651
580	II		Fugue	D maj.	Organ	38: 215			00662
II 42	II		Fugue	F maj.	Organ			in SBB P 817: 1–3	01350
576	II		Fugue	G maj.	Organ	38: 106	IV/11		00658
577	II		Fugue	G maj.	Organ	38: 111	IV/11: 44		00659
581	II		Fugue	G maj.	Organ		IV/11	by Homilius?	00663
131a	II		Fugue	G min.	Organ	38: 217	IV/11: 3	after BWV 131/5	00161
534	II		Prelude and Fugue	F min.	Organ	15: 104	IV/5: 130	by Bach, W. F.?	00608
536a	II	c.1760–1789?	Prelude and Fugue	A maj.	Organ		IV/6: 114	after BWV 536, 152/1; arr. by Scholz?	00612
545b	II	1708–1717	Prelude, Trio and Fugue	B♭ maj.	Organ		IV/11: 6	after BWV 545a; ↔ 545, 1029/3	00624
553	II		Eight Short Preludes and Fugues No. 1	C maj.	Organ	38: 23	IV/11	by Krebs, J. T. or J. L.?	00633
554	II		Eight Short Preludes and Fugues No. 2	D min.	Organ	38: 27	IV/11	by Krebs, J. T. or J. L.?	00634
555	II		Eight Short Preludes and Fugues No. 3	E min.	Organ	38: 30	IV/11	by Krebs, J. T. or J. L.?	00635
556	II		Eight Short Preludes and Fugues No. 4	F maj.	Organ	38: 33	IV/11	by Krebs, J. T. or J. L.?	00636
557	II		Eight Short Preludes and Fugues No. 5	G maj.	Organ	38: 36	IV/11	by Krebs, J. T. or J. L.?	00637
558	II		Eight Short Preludes and Fugues No. 6	G min.	Organ	38: 39	IV/11	by Krebs, J. T. or J. L.?	00638
559	II		Eight Short Preludes and Fugues No. 7	A min.	Organ	38: 42	IV/11	by Krebs, J. T. or J. L.?	00639
560	II		Eight Short Preludes and Fugues No. 8	B♭ maj.	Organ	38: 45	IV/11	by Krebs, J. T. or J. L.?	00640
561	II		Fantasia and Fugue	A min.	Organ	38: 48			00641
568	II		Prelude	G maj.	Organ	38: 85	IV/6: 51		00648
584	II		Trio	G min.	Organ		I/12: 23; IV/11	after BWV 166/2	00666
1027 /1a /2a /4a	II		Trio	G maj.	Organ		IV/11	after BWV 1027/1–2 /4, 1039/1–2 /4; arr. by Kellner, J. P.?	01209
591	II		Kleines harmonisches Labyrinth		Organ	38: 225	IV/11: 50	by Heinichen?	00673
597	II		Concerto for solo organ	E♭ maj.	Organ		IV/11	after lost model?	00680
598	II		Pedal-Exercitium (fragment)		Organ	38: 210		by Bach, C. P. E.?	00681
676a	II	1739–1789	chorale setting "Allein Gott in der Höh sei Ehr" (later variant)		Organ	40: 208	IV/4: KB 48	after BWV 676	00792
683a	II	1739–1789	chorale setting "Vater unser im Himmelreich" (later variant)		Organ		IV/4: KB 51	after BWV 683	00800
N 205	II							see BWV 1121	01516
II 48	II		chorale setting "Allein Gott in der Höh sei Ehr"		Organ			by Walther (& Scholz?)	01356
II 49	II		chorale setting "Ein feste Burg ist unser Gott"		Organ			by Walther?	01357
II 50	II		chorale setting "Erhalt uns, Herr, hei deinem Wort"		Organ				01358
II 51	II		chorale setting "Erstanden ist der heilge Christ"		Organ				01359
II 52	II		chorale setting "Freu dich sehr, o meine Seele"		Organ				01360
II 53	II		chorale setting "Freu dich sehr, o meine Seele"		Organ				01361
II 54	II		chorale setting "Helft mir Gotts Güte preisen"		Organ				01362
II 54	II		chorale setting "Von Gott will ich nicht lassen"		Organ				01362
II 55	II	1714-1717 or earlier	chorale setting "Herr Christ, der einig Gottes Sohn"		Organ				01363
II 58	II		chorale setting "Jesu, meine Freude"		Organ				01366
II 59	II		chorale setting "Jesu, meine Freude"		Organ				01367
II 60	II		chorale setting "Nun lob, mein Seel, den Herren"		Organ			by Walther?	01368
II 62a	II		chorale setting "Sei Lob und Ehr mit hohem Preis"		Organ				01370
II 62b	II		chorale setting "Sei Lob und Ehr mit hohem Preis"		Organ				01371
II 63	II		chorale setting "Vom Himmel hoch"		Organ				01372
II 64	II		chorale setting "Vom Himmel hoch"		Organ				01373
II 65	II		chorale setting "Vom Himmel hoch"		Organ				01374
II 66	II		chorale setting "Wachet auf, ruft uns"		Organ Tr			by Krebs, J. L.?	01375
II 67	II		chorale setting "Was Gott tut, das ist wohlgetan"		Organ				01376
II 68	II		chorale setting "Wer nur den lieben Gott läßt walten"		Organ				01377
II 69	II		chorale setting "Wir glauben all an einen Gott"		Organ				01378
II 70	II		chorale setting "Wir glauben all an einen Gott"		Organ				01379
II 71	II							see BWV 1128	01725
II 72	II		chorale setting "Christus der uns selig macht" (Canon)		Organ				01381
II 74	II		chorale setting "Schmücke dich, o liebe Seele"		Organ				01383
II 75	II		chorale setting "Herr Christ, der einig Gottes Sohn"		Organ				01384
II 76	II		chorale setting "Jesu, meine Freude"		Organ				01385
II 77	II		chorale setting "Herr Christ, der einig Gottes Sohn"		Organ				01386
II 78	II		chorale setting "Wenn wir in höchsten Nöten sein"		Organ				01387
II 79	II		chorale setting "Befiehl du deine Wege"		Organ				01388
691a	II	1720–1789	chorale setting "Wer nur den lieben Gott läßt walten" (variant)		Organ	40: 151		after BWV 691	00809
705	II		chorale setting "Durch Adams Fall ist ganz verderbt" (Kirnb. coll. No. 16)		Organ	40: 23	IV/10: 47	after Z 7549	00825
708	II	1700–1789	chorale setting "Ich hab mein Sach Gott heimgestellt" (alio modo; Kirnb. coll. No. 19)		Organ	40: 30	IV/10: 86	after Z 1679	00828
708a	II	1700–1789	chorale setting "Ich hab mein Sach Gott heimgestellt"		Organ	40: 152	IV/10: 86	after Z 1679	00829
716	II		chorale setting "Allein Gott in der Höh sei Ehr" (Fantasia)		Organ	40: 45	IV/10: 14	after Z 4457	00838
726	II	bef. c.1727	chorale setting "Herr Jesu Christ, dich zu uns wend"		Organ	40: 72	IV/3: 45	after Z 624	00849
743	II	bef. c.1740	chorale setting "Ach, was ist doch unser Leben"		Organ		IV/10: 11	after Z 1208b; by Buttstett, J. H.?	00871
745	II	1700–1788	chorale setting "Aus der Tiefe rufe ich"		Organ	40: 171	IV/10: 22	after Z 1217; by Bach, C. P. E.?	00873
749	II	c.1700–1717	chorale setting "Herr Jesu Christ, dich zu uns wend"		Organ		IV/10: 80	after Z 624; by Bach, J. Christoph or Telemann?	00878
750	II	c.1700–1703	chorale setting "Herr Jesu Christ, meins Lebens Licht"		Organ		IV/10: 81		00879
752	II	c.1700–1717	chorale setting "Jesu, der du meine Seele"		Organ			after Z 6779a	00881
754	II	bef. c.1740	chorale setting "Liebster Jesu, wir sind hier"		Organ			after Z 3498b	00883
755	II		chorale setting "Nun freut euch, lieben Christen g'mein"		Organ			after Z 4429a	00884
756	II		chorale setting "Nun ruhen alle Wälder"		Organ			after Z 2293b	00885
757	II		chorale setting "O Herre Gott, dein göttlichs Wort"		Organ			after Z 5690	00886
758	II		chorale setting "O Vater, allmächtiger Gott"		Organ	40: 179	IV/11: 69	after Z 8603b	00887
762	II	bef. c.1717	chorale setting "Vater unser im Himmelreich"		Organ		IV/10: 142	after Z 2561	00891
763	II		chorale setting "Wie schön leucht uns der Morgenstern"		Organ			after Z 8359	00892
765	II	bef. c.1717	chorale setting "Wir glauben all an einen Gott"		Organ	40: 187		after Z 7971	00894
N 206	II		chorale setting "Ach bleib mit deiner Gnade"		Organ			by Pachelbel (P 376)	01517
N 206	II		chorale setting "Christus, der ist mein Leben"		Organ			by Pachelbel (P 376)	01517
II 80	II	1707–1708 or earlier	Suite	F maj.	Keyboard		V/12		01389
821	II		Suite	B♭ maj.	Keyboard	42: 213	V/12: 3		00959
834	II		Allemande	C min.	Keyboard	42: 259	V/12		00973
839	II	1735-03-07 or earlier	Sarabande	G min.	Keyboard		V/12	in Notenbuch der Zeumerin	00978
844	II		Toccatina No. 4 Scherzo	D min.	Keyboard	42: 220	V/12: 16	by Bach, W. F.? ↔ BWV 844a	00983
844a	II		Scherzo	E min.	Keyboard	42: 281	V/12: 22	by Bach, W. F.? (BR A55); ↔ BWV 844	00984
845	II		Gigue	F min.	Keyboard	42: 263	V/12		00985
II 81	II		Gigue (incomplete)	D min.	Keyboard		V/12	by Kellner, J. P.?	01390
II 82	II		Ciacona	B♭ maj.	Keyboard		V/12	by Bach, J. B.?	01391
II 83	II		Ciacona	A maj.	Keyboard		V/12	by Bach, J. B. or H.?	01392
II 84	II		Ciacona	G maj.	Keyboard		V/12	by Bach, J. B.?	01393
II 85	II		Toccata and Fugue	F min.	Keyboard	42: XXXV	V/12: 114, 122	by Dobenecker?	01394
898	II		Prelude and Fugue on B-A-C-H	B♭ maj.	Keyboard	42: XXXIV	V/12		01067
II 86	II		Fantasia	C min.	Keyboard	42: 243	V/12	by Gronau?	01395
II 87	II		Fantasia	C maj.	Keyboard		V/12	by Benda?	01396
905	II		Fantasia and Fugue	D min.	Keyboard	42: 179	V/12: 24		01076
907	II		Fantasia and Fughetta	B♭ maj.	Keyboard	42: 268	V/12: 28	by Kirchhoff?	01078
908	II		Fantasia and Fughetta	D maj.	Keyboard	42: 272	V/12: 34	by Kirchhoff?	01079
909	II		Concerto e Fuga	C min.	Keyboard	42: 190	V/12: 38		01080
919	II		Fantasia	C min.	Keyboard	36: 152	V/12: 48	by Bach, J. B. or J. B. the Younger?	01092
920	II		Fantasia	G min.	Keyboard	42: 183	V/12		01093
923a	II		Toccatina No. 3 Prelude	A min.	Keyboard	42: 279	V/12: 14	after BWV 923	01097
II 89	II		Fugue	C maj.	Keyboard	42: XXXIV	V/12		01398
II 90	II		Fugue	C maj.	Kb (with ped?)	38: 213	IV/11: 58, 61	by Bach, C. P. E. (H 388) or Pachelbel?	01399
II 91	II		Fugue	G maj.	Keyboard	42: XXXIV	V/12		01401
II 92	II		Fugue	G maj.	Keyboard		V/12		01402
II 93	II		Fugue	E min.	Keyboard	42: XXXIV	V/12		01403
II 95	II		Fugue	E min.	Keyboard	42: XXXIV	V/12		01405
II 96	II		Fugue	D maj.	Keyboard		V/12	by Bach, C. P. E.? (H 373.5)	01406
II 98	II		Fugue	D min.	Keyboard		V/12	by Bach, C. P. E.? (H 373.5)	01408
II 99	II		Fugue	D min.	Keyboard		V/12		01409
II 100	II		Fugue	D min.	Keyboard		V/12	by Bach, C. P. E.? (H 373.5)	01410
II 101	II		Fugue	G min.	Keyboard	42: XXXV	V/12: 130	by Dobenecker?	01411
II 102	II		Fugue	E♭ min.	Keyboard		V/12		01412
897/2	II		Fugue	A min.	Keyboard	42: 175	V/12	by Dretzel or Bach, W. F.?	01066
945	II		Fugue	E min.	Keyboard	36: 155	V/12	by Graupner?	01120
956	II		Fugue	E min.	Keyboard	42: 200	V/12: 70		01133
958	II		Fugue	A min.	Keyboard	42: 205	V/12: 74		01135
960	II		Fugue (incomplete)	E min.	Keyboard	42: 276	V/12		01137
N 207	II		Fugue	E min.	Keyboard		IV/11	by Seger?	01518
II 109	II		Fugue on B-A-C-H	G min.	Keyboard		V/12		01419
964	II		Sonata	D min.	Keyboard	42: 3	V/12: 78	after BWV 1003	01141
II 111	II		Largo and Allegro	G maj.	Keyboard	42: XXXV	V/12		01421
968	II		Adagio	G maj.	Keyboard	42: 27	V/12: 94	after BWV 1005/1	01145
969	II		Toccatina No. 5 Andante	G min.	Keyboard	42: 218	V/12: 18		01146
II 113	II	1725 (AMB)	Notebook A. M. Bach (1725) No. 3 Minuet	F maj.	Keyboard	43^{2}: 25	V/4: 82		01423
II 116	II	1725 (AMB)	Notebook A. M. Bach (1725) No. 7 Minuet	G maj.	Keyboard	43^{2}: 28	V/4: 87		01426
II 117	II	1725 (AMB)	Notebook A. M. Bach (1725) No. 8a and 8b two Polonaises	F maj.	Keyboard	43^{2}: 28	V/4: 88		01427; 01428
II 118	II	1725 (AMB)	Notebook A. M. Bach (1725) No. 9 Minuet	B♭ maj.	Keyboard	43^{2}: 29	V/4: 89		01429
II 119	II	1725 (AMB)	Notebook A. M. Bach (1725) No. 10 Polonaise	G min.	Keyboard	43^{2}: 30	V/4: 90		01430
II 120	II	1725 (AMB)	Notebook A. M. Bach (1725) No. 14 Minuet	A min.	Keyboard	43^{2}: 31	V/4: 92		01431
II 121	II	1725 (AMB)	Notebook A. M. Bach (1725) No. 15 Minuet	C min.	Keyboard	43^{2}: 32	V/4: 92		01432
II 126	II	1725 (AMB)	Notebook A. M. Bach (1725) No. 22 Musette	D maj.	Keyboard	43^{2}: 35	V/4: 99		01437
II 127	II	1725 (AMB)	Notebook A. M. Bach (1725) No. 23 March	E♭ maj.	Keyboard	43^{2}: 35	V/4: 100	by Bach, C. P. E.	01438
II 128	II	1725 (AMB)	Notebook A. M. Bach (1725) No. 24 (Polonaise)	D min.	Keyboard	43^{2}: 36	V/4: 101		01439
II 132	II	1725 (AMB)	Notebook A. M. Bach (1725) No. 36 Minuet	D min.	Keyboard	43^{2}: 48	V/4: 125		01443
II 151	II		Concerto	C maj.	Keyboard	42: XXXIV	V/12		01462
II 152	II		Concerto	G maj.	Vl Hc	42: XXXIV	VI/5		01463
990	II		Sarabanda con Partitis	C maj.	Keyboard	42: 221	V/12: 97		01168
II 153	II		Sonata	A maj.	Vl Bc		VI/5		01464
II 154	II		Sonata	E♭ maj.	Vl Hc		VI/5		01465
1020	II		Sonata	G min.	Vl Hc	9: 274	VI/5	by Bach, C. P. E.? (H 542.5)	01201
1022	II		Sonata	F maj.	Vl Hc		VI/5: 27	by Bach, C. P. E.?; after BWV 1021; ↔ BWV 1038	01203
1024	II		Sonata	C min.	Vl Bc		VI/5		01205
1031	II		Sonata	E♭ maj.	Fl Hc	9: 22	VI/5: 13	by Bach, C. P. E.? (H 545)	01213
1033	II		Sonata	C maj.	Fl Bc	43^{1}: 3	VI/5: 3	by Bach, C. P. E.? (H 564.5)	01215
1038	II	1732–1735	Sonata	G maj.	Fl Vl Bc	9: 219	VI/5: 45	by Bach, C. P. E.? (H 590.5); after BWV 1021; ↔ BWV 1022	01220
525a	II		Concerto (Trio sonata)	C maj.	Vl Vc Bc		VI/5	after BWV 525/1, 1032/2, 525/3	01718
II 155	II		Concerto	A maj.	**Kb** Str Bc		VI/5		01466
I 22	II		Concerto	B♭ maj.	**Ob** **Vl** Str Bc		VI/5	by Förster (C.?)?	01330
1070	II		Orchestral Suite (No. 5)	G min.	Str Bc	45^{1}: 190	VI/5	by Bach, W. F.?	01256
**Anh. III**	Works of other composers, spuriously attributed to Bach								Up ↑
III 156	III		Cantata Herr Christ, der einge Gottes Sohn (Annunciation)		SATB Str Bc			by Telemann (TWV 1:732)	01467
III 157	III		Cantata Ich habe Lust zu scheiden (Purification)		s 2Fl Str Bc			by Telemann (TWV 1:836)	01468
15	III	1726-04-21 (JSB)	Cantata Denn du wirst meine Seele nicht in der Hölle lassen (Easter)		satbSATB 3Tr Tmp Str Bc	2: 135	I/41	by Bach, J. L. (JLB 21); text in Meiningen 1704	00017
141	III		Cantata Das ist je gewißlich wahr (3rd Sunday of Advent)		atbSATB 2Ob Str Bc	30: 3	I/41	by Telemann (TWV 1:183)	00173
145/b	III		Cantata movement So du mit deinem Munde bekennest Jesum (Easter)	D maj.	SATB Tr Str Bc	30: 96	I/10: 142	by Telemann (TWV 1:1350/1)	00178
160	III	1725–1732?	Cantata Ich weiß, daß mein Erlöser lebt (Easter)	C maj.	t Vl Bas Bc	32: 171	I/41	by Telemann (TWV 1:877)	00194
218	III		Cantata Gott der Hoffnung erfülle euch (Pentecost)		satbSATB 2Hn Str Bc	41: 223		by Telemann (TWV 1:634)	00275
219	III		Cantata Siehe, es hat überwunden der Löwe (Michaelmas)		sabSATB Str Bc	41: 239		by Telemann (TWV 1:1328)	00276
222	III		Cantata Mein Odem ist schwach (Purification)		sabSATB Str Bc			by Bach, J. Ernst; → BWV Anh. 165	00279
III 158	III		Aria "Andrò dall'colle al Prato"		s 2Fl (2Hn) Str Bc			by Bach, J. C.	03022
III 160	III	1750–1755? (Harrer?)	Motet Jauchzet dem Herrn alle Welt, TWV 8:10	C maj.	2SATB		III/3: 15	after Telemann (/1; /3 after TWV 1:1066), BWV 28/2 (/2 = BWV 28/2a); text after Psalm 100	01471
III 161	III		Motet Kündlich groß ist das gottselige Geheimnis/1 (Christmas)	D maj.	SATB Str? Bc		III/3	by Graun (C. H.?), precedes laudes A and B of BWV 243a	01472
III 162	III		Motet Lob und Ehre und Weisheit und Dank		2SATB		III/3	by Wagner, G. G.	01473
III 163	III		Motet Merk auf, mein Herz, und sieh dorthin		2SATB		III/3	by Bach, J. B. or J. Ernst	01474
III 164	III		Motet Nun danket alle Gott		SSATB		III/3: 52	by Altnickol	01475
III 165	III		Motet Unser Wandel ist im Himmel		SATB		III/3	by Bach, J. Ernst; after BWV 222/3 /4 /6	01476
III 166	III	1716 (JLB); 1729 (JSB)	Kyrie–Gloria Mass Missa sopra cantilena "Allein Gott in der Höh' sei Ehr"	E min.	SSATB 2Vl 2Vla Vc Bc	11^{1}: XV; 41: 276	II/9	by Bach, J. L. (JLB 38), start of Gloria arr. by Bach	01477
II 24	III	1715–1717, 1724 (JSB)	Kyrie–Gloria Mass	A min.	SATB Str Bc	11^{1}: XV	II/9	after Missa Sancti Lamberti by Pez, J. C.	01332
II 26	III	1727–1732 (JSB)	Kyrie–Gloria Mass	C min.	satbSATB 3Tbn 2Vl Bc	41: 193; 11^{1}: XVI	II/2: 295	by Durante (alternative Christe: BWV 242)	01334
II 27	III	c. 1745? (JLK)	Sanctus	F maj.	SATB 2Hn 2Ob Str Bc	11^{1}: XVII	II/9	by Krebs, J. L. (Krebs‑WV 104)	01335
III 168	III	c. 1747? (WFB)	Kyrie and German Gloria	G min.	sSATB Str Bc	11^{1}: XVII	II/9	by Bach, W. F. (BR E1 F 100)	01479
I 21	III	c. 1707 (MH)	Magnificat Meine Seel erhebt den Herren	A min.	s Fl 2Vl Bc	11^{1}: XVIII	II/9	by Hoffmann, M.	01329
III 169	III	1724–1725	Passion Erbauliche Gedanken auf den Grünen Donnerstag und Charfreitag über den Leidenden Jesum					text by Picander partly used in BWV 244 but no other known setting	01480
8/6	III	1713 (Vet.); 1724-09-24 (JSB)	chorale setting "Liebster Gott, wenn werd ich sterben" (s. 5)	E maj.	SATB	1: 241	I/23: 161	by Vetter, D. (Z 6634); text by Neumann	00009
8/6	III	1713 (Vet.); 1724-09-24 (JSB)	chorale setting "Liebster Gott, wenn werd ich sterben" (s. 5)	E maj.	SATB	1: 241	III/2.1: 63; III/2.2: 25	by Vetter, D. (Z 6634); text by Neumann	11228
8/6	III	1713 (Vet.); 1724-09-24 (JSB)	chorale setting "Liebster Gott, wenn werd ich sterben" (s. 5)	D maj.	SATB		I/23: 219	by Vetter, D. (Z 6634); text by Neumann	00010
27/6	III	1652 (Ros.); 1726-10-06 (JSB)	chorale setting "Welt, ade, ich bin dein müde" (s. 1)	B♭ maj.	SSATB	5^{1}: 244	I/23: 251	by Rosenmüller (Z 6531); text by Albinus	01481
III 170	III	1652 (Ros.); 1726-10-06 (JSB)	chorale setting "Welt, ade, ich bin dein müde" (s. 1)	B♭ maj.	SSATB	5^{1}: 244	III/2.2: 86	by Rosenmüller (Z 6531); text by Albinus	11345
43/11	III	1652 (Pet.); 1726-05-30 (JSB)	chorale setting "Du lebensfürst, Herr Jesu Christ" (ss. 1, 13)	G maj.	SATB	10: 126	I/12: 164	by Peter after Z 5741b; text by Rist	11241
43/11	III	1652 (Pet.); 1726-05-30 (JSB)	chorale setting "Ermuntre dich, mein schwacher Geist"	G maj.	SATB	10: 126	III/2.1: 74; III/2.2: 57	by Peter after Z 5741b; text by Rist	11241
567	III		Prelude	C maj.	Organ	38: 84	IV/11	by Krebs, J. L. (Krebs‑WV 401)	00647
III 178	III	last third of 17th century	Toccata quasi Fantasia con Fuge	A maj.	Organ	42: 250	V/12	by Reincken?	01489
II 43	III	c. 1788	Fugue	B min.	Organ		IV/11	by Pölitz; after H 776/18	01351
II 44	III		Fugue	G maj.	Organ		IV/11	by Kellner, J. P. or J. C.	01352
II 45	III	c. 1799	Fugue on B-A-C-H	B♭ maj.	Organ		IV/11	by Knecht	01353
II 88	III	1765	Fugue	C maj.	Keyboard		V/12	by Kellner, J. C.	01397
II 97	III		Fugue	F♯ maj.	Keyboard	42: XXXV	IV/11: 63	by Krebs, J. L. (Krebs‑WV 409/2)	01407
II 103	III	c. 1711–1718 (GFH)	Fugue	A min.	Keyboard		V/12	by Handel (HWV 609)	01413
II 104	III	c. 1711–1718 (GFH)	Fugue	C min.	Keyboard		V/12	by Handel (HWV 610)	01414
II 105	III	c. 1711–1718 (GFH)	Fugue	B♭ maj.	Keyboard		V/12	by Handel (HWV 607)	01415
II 106	III	c. 1711–1718 (GFH)	Fugue	G min.	Keyboard		V/12	by Handel (HWV 605)	01416
N 208	III	1747 (JEE)	Fugue	E♭ min.	Keyboard		IV/11	After Toccata nona by Eberlin	01519
II 46	III		Trio	C min.	Organ		IV/11	by Krebs, J. T.	01354
692	III		chorale setting "Ach Gott und Herr" (Kirnb. coll. No. 3)	C maj.	Organ	40: 4	IV/11	by Walther; after BWV 692a	00810
692a	III		chorale setting "Ach Gott und Herr" (early version)	C maj.	Organ	40: 152	IV/11	by Walther; → BWV 692	00811
693	III		chorale setting "Ach Gott und Herr" (Kirnb. coll. No. 4)	C maj.	Organ	40: 5	IV/11	by Walther	00812
723	III		chorale setting "Gelobet seist du, Jesu Christ" (also in Neumeister Collection)		Organ	40: 63		after Z 1947; by Bach, J. Michael	00846
740	III		chorale setting "Wir glauben all an einen Gott"		Organ	40: 103		after Z 4000; by Krebs, J. L. (Krebs‑WV 554c)	00868
744	III		chorale setting "Auf meinen lieben Gott"		Organ	40: 170	IV/10: 20	after Z 2164; by Krebs, J. L. (Krebs‑WV 517)	00872
746	III	1715 or earlier (JCFF)	chorale setting "Christ ist erstanden"	D min.	Organ	40: 173	IV/10	by Fischer (Ariadne Musica No. 24)	00874
748	III	1700–1739	chorale setting "Gott der Vater wohn uns bei"	D maj.	Organ	40: 177	IV/10	by Walther; → BWV 748a	00876
748a	III	1700–1789	chorale setting "Gott der Vater wohn uns bei" (variant)	D maj.	Organ		IV/10	by Scholz (arr.)?; after BWV 748	00877
751	III		chorale setting "In dulci jubilo" (also in Neumeister Collection)		Organ		IV/10	by Bach, J. Michael	00880
759	III		chorale setting "Schmücke dich, o liebe Seele"	F maj.	Organ	40: 181	IV/10	by Homilius (HoWV VIII.17)	00888
760	III		chorale setting "Vater unser im Himmelreich"		Organ	40: 183	IV/10	by Böhm	00889
761	III		chorale setting "Vater unser im Himmelreich"		Organ	40: 184	IV/10	by Böhm	00890
1096	III		chorale setting "Christe, der du bist Tag und Licht" (3 versions; Neumeister Chorales No. 8)	A min.	Organ		IV/9: 16, 76	by Pachelbel?	01282
1096	III		chorale setting "Wir danken dir, Herr Jesu Christ" (3 versions; Neumeister Chorales No. 8)	A min.	Organ		IV/9: 16, 76	by Pachelbel?	01282
771	III		chorale setting "Allein Gott in der Höh sei Ehr"	G maj.	Organ	40: 195	IV/11	by Vetter, A. N.	00901
II 47	III		chorale setting "Herzlich tut mich verlangen"	A min.	Organ		IV/10	by Kellner, J. P.	01355
II 47	III		chorale setting "Ach Herr, mich armen Sünder"	A min.	Organ		IV/10	by Kellner, J. P.	01355
II 56	III	1735 (Telem.)	chorale setting "Herr Jesu Christ dich zu uns wend"		Organ		IV/10	by Telemann (TWV 31:8)	01364
II 57	III		chorale setting "Jesu Leiden, Pein und Tod"		Organ		IV/10	by Vogler	01365
II 61	III		chorale setting "O Mensch, bewein dein Sünde groß"	F maj.	Organ		IV/10	by Pachelbel (P 396)	01369
II 73	III	1720–1788	chorale setting "Ich ruf zu dir, Herr Jesu Christ"	F min.	Organ		IV/10	by Bach, C. P. E.; after BWV 639	01382
III 171	III		chorale setting "Christ lag in Todesbanden"		Organ	40: 174	IV/10	by Pachelbel (P 58)	01482
III 172	III		chorale setting "Herr Jesu Christ, dich zu uns wend"	G maj.	Organ		IV/10	by Krebs, J. L. (Krebs‑WV 524)	01483
824	III	1720 (WFB)	Klavierbüchlein WFB No. 47: Suite	A maj.	Keyboard	36: 231	V/5: 78	by Telemann (TWV 32:14)	00962
835	III	1761 (Kirnb.)	Allemande	A min.	Keyboard	42: 267	V/12	by Kirnberger (EngK 74)	00974
838	III		Allemande and Courante	A maj.	Keyboard	42: 265	V/12	by Graupner (GWV 849/2 /3)	00977
840	III		Courante	G maj.	Keyboard		V/12	by Telemann (TWV 32:13/2)	00979
897/1	III	c. 1736–1743 (CHD)	Prelude	A min.	Keyboard	42: 173	V/12	by Dretzel ("Adagiosissimo")	01065
962	III	c. 1783 (JGA)	Fugue	E min.	Keyboard	42: 198	V/12	by Albrechtsberger (Op. 1/8)	01139
970	III		Toccatina No. 6 Presto	D min.	Keyboard	42: XXXIV	V/12	by Bach, W. F. (BR A49 F 25/2)	11148
II 94	III	1774 (Kirnb.)	Fugue	E min.	Keyboard	42: XXXIV	V/12	by Kirnberger (EngK 35)	01404
II 107	III		Fugue on B-A-C-H	C maj.	Keyboard	42: XXXIV	V/12	by Sorge?	01417
II 108	III		Fugue on B-A-C-H	C maj.	Keyboard	42: XXXIV	V/12	by Bach, C. P. E. (H 373) or Sorge?	01418
II 110	III		Fugue on B-A-C-H	C min.	Keyboard	42: XXXIV	V/12	by Sorge?	01420
II 112	III	1780 (Kirnb.)	Grave	E min.	Keyboard		V/12	by Kirnberger (EngK 16)	01422
II 114	III	1725 (AMB)	Notebook A. M. Bach (1725) No. 4 Minuet	G maj.	Keyboard	43^{2}: 26	V/4: 83	by Petzold	01424
II 115	III	1725 (AMB)	Notebook A. M. Bach (1725) No. 5 Minuet	G min.	Keyboard	43^{2}: 26	V/4: 84	by Petzold	01425
II 122	III	1725 (CPE)	Notebook A. M. Bach (1725) No. 16 March	D maj.	Keyboard	43^{2}: 32	V/4: 94	by Bach, C. P. E. (H 1/1)	01433
II 123	III	1725 (CPE)	Notebook A. M. Bach (1725) No. 17 Polonaise	G min.	Keyboard	43^{2}: 32	V/4: 95	by Bach, C. P. E. (H 1/2)	01434
II 124	III	1725 (CPE)	Notebook A. M. Bach (1725) No. 18 March	G maj.	Keyboard	43^{2}: 33	V/4: 96	by Bach, C. P. E. (H 1/3)	01435
II 125	III	1725 (CPE)	Notebook A. M. Bach (1725) No. 19 Polonaise	G min.	Keyboard	43^{2}: 33	V/4: 97	by Bach, C. P. E. (H 1/4)	01436
II 129	III	1725 (AMB)	Notebook A. M. Bach (1725) No. 27 Solo per il cembalo	E♭ maj.	Keyboard	43^{2}: 38	V/4: 104	by Bach, C. P. E. (H 16)	01440
II 130	III	1725 (AMB)	Notebook A. M. Bach (1725) No. 28 Polonaise	G maj.	Keyboard	43^{2}: 39	V/4: 106	by Hasse	01441
II 131	III	c.1745?	Notebook A. M. Bach (1725) No. 32	F maj.	Keyboard	43^{2}: 46	V/4: 121	by Bach, J. C. (W A22)	01442
II 133	III	1763 or later	Musical clock No. 1 Fantasia	G maj.	Musical clock		V/12	by Bach, W. F. (BR A63 F 207)	01444
II 134	III	1763 or later	Musical clock No. 2 Scherzo	G maj.	Musical clock		V/12	by Bach, W. F. (BR A64 F 207)	01445
II 135	III	1763 or later	Musical clock No. 3 Bourlesca	A min.	Musical clock		V/12	by Bach, W. F. (BR A65 F 207)	01446
II 136	III	1763 or later	Musical clock No. 4 Trio	A min.	Musical clock		V/12	by Bach, W. F. (BR A66 F 207)	01447
II 137	III	1763 or later	Musical clock No. 5 L'Intrada della Caccia	E♭ maj.	Musical clock		V/12	by Bach, W. F. (BR A67 F 207)	01448
II 138	III	1763 or later	Musical clock No. 6 Continuazione della Caccia	E♭ maj.	Musical clock		V/12	by Bach, W. F. (BR A68 F 207)	01449
II 139	III	1763 or later	Musical clock No. 7 Il Fine delle Caccia I	D maj.	Musical clock		V/12	by Bach, W. F. (BR A69 F 207)	01450
II 140	III	1763 or later	Musical clock No. 8 Il Fine delle Caccia II	D min.	Musical clock		V/12	by Bach, W. F. (BR A70 F 207)	01451
II 141	III	1763 or later	Musical clock No. 9 Song "O Gott die Christenheit"	F maj.	Musical clock		V/12	by Bach, W. F. (BR A71 F 207)	01452
II 142	III	1763 or later	Musical clock No. 10 Psalm 110	A min.	Musical clock		V/12	by Bach, W. F. (BR A72 F 207)	01453
II 143	III	1763 or later	Musical clock No. 11 Polonaise	E min.	Musical clock		V/12	by Bach, W. F. (BR A73 F 207)	01454
II 144	III	1763 or later	Musical clock No. 12 Polonaise Trio	A min.	Musical clock		V/12	by Bach, W. F. (BR A74 F 207)	01455
II 145	III	1763 or later	Musical clock No. 13 March	C maj.	Musical clock		V/12	by Bach, W. F. (BR A75 F 207)	01456
II 146	III	1763 or later	Musical clock No. 14 March	F maj.	Musical clock		V/12	by Bach, W. F. (BR A76 F 207)	01457
II 147	III	1763 or later	Musical clock No. 15 La Combattuta	G maj.	Musical clock		V/12	by Bach, W. F. (BR A77 F 207)	01458
II 148	III	1763 or later	Musical clock No. 16 Scherzo	G min.	Musical clock		V/12	by Bach, W. F. (BR A78 F 207)	01459
II 149	III	1763 or later	Musical clock No. 17 Minuet	G maj.	Musical clock		V/12	by Bach, W. F. (BR A79 F 207)	01460
II 150	III	1763 or later	Musical clock No. 18 Trio	G min.	Musical clock		V/12	by Bach, W. F. (BR A80 F 207)	01461
III 177	III		Prelude and Fugue	E♭ maj.	Keyboard	36: 88	V/12: 134	by Bach, J. Christoph?	01488
III 179	III	1728 (JDH)	Fantasia durch alle Tonarten gehend	A min.	Keyboard		V/12	by Heinichen	01490
III 180	III		Fugue	D min.	Keyboard	36: 188	V/12	by Kellner, J. P.	01491
III 181	III		Fugue	A min.	Keyboard		V/12	by Krebs, J. L. (Krebs‑WV 825/2)	01492
III 182	III		Passacaglia	D min.	Keyboard	42: 234	V/12	by Witt	01493
III 183	III	1725 (AMB)	Notebook A. M. Bach (1725) No. 6 Rondeau	B♭ maj.	Keyboard	43^{2}: 27	V/4: 85	by Couperin (6^{ième} Ordre: Les Bergeries)	01494
1036	III	1731 (CPE)	Trio	D min.	Vl Hc (2Vl Bc)		VI/5	by Bach, C. P. E. (H 569; Wq 145)	01218
1037	III	c. 1740s (JGG)	Sonata	C maj.	2Vl Bc	9: 229	VI/5	by Goldberg	01219
III 173	III	1712 (FAB) c. 1723 (JSB)	Invention	B min.	Vl Kb	45^{1}: 172	VI/5	by Bonporti (Op. 10 No. 2)	01484
III 174	III	1712 (FAB) c. 1723 (JSB)	Invention	B♭ maj.	Vl Kb	45^{1}: 176	VI/5	by Bonporti (Op. 10 No. 5)	01485
III 175	III	1712 (FAB) c. 1723 (JSB)	Invention	C min.	Vl Kb	45^{1}: 181	VI/5	by Bonporti (Op. 10 No. 6)	01486
III 176	III	1712 (FAB) c. 1723 (JSB)	Invention	D maj.	Vl Kb	45^{1}: 185	VI/5	by Bonporti (Op. 10 No. 7)	01487
III 184	III	c. 1747 (Zuc.)	Sonata	A min.	Vl Bc		VI/5	by Zuccari (Op. 1 No. 10)	01495
III 185	III		Sonata	D maj.	2Vl Bc		VI/5	by Bach, C. P. E. (H 585; ≈H 507; Wq 74)	01496
III 186	III		Sonata	F maj.	2Vl Bc		VI/5	by Bach, C. P. E. (H 576; Wq 154)	01497
III 187	III		Sonata (Trio)	F maj.	Bas Fl Vne		VI/5	by Bach, C. P. E. (H 589)	02454
III 188	III	c. 1740 (WFB)	Sonata (Concerto)	F maj.	2Hc	43^{1}: 47	V/12	by Bach, W. F. (BR A12 F 10)	01499
I 23	III	1710 (Alb.) c.1710 (JSB)	Concerto	E min.	2Vl Va Vc Vne		VI/5	by Albinoni (Op. 2 No. 4 = 2nd Concerto)	01331
III 189	III	1745–1747 (JSB)	Concerto	A min.	**Hc** Str Bc		VI/5	by Bach, C. P. E. (H 403; Wq 1)	01500
**Anh. N**	New additions to the Anhang								Up ↑
—									Up ↑
655b	–	1708–1789	chorale setting "Herr Jesu Christ, dich zu uns wend" (alternative version "a" in BGA)		Organ	25^{2}: 159		after BWV 655(a); ↔ 655c	00754
655c	–	1708–1789	chorale setting "Herr Jesu Christ, dich zu uns wend" (alternative version "b" in BGA)		Organ	25^{2}: 160		after BWV 655(a); ↔ 655b	00755
813a	–		French Suites, No. 2 – Version B (early version): No. 6 Menuet II	C min.	Keyboard	36: 236	V/8: 79		00947
deest	BC; C 8	1723–1750? (JSB?)	Motet Der Gerechte kömmt um (Wer ist der, so von Edom kömmt/39; funer. motet?)	E min.	SSATB 2Fl 2Ob Str Bc		I/41: 127	by Kuhnau? (Tristis est...); arr. by Bach?	01532
deest	BC; D 1	1717-03-28?	Passion Weimarer Passion		?stbSATB 2Fl 2Ob Str Bc			→ BWV 23/4 (and 55/3; 244/29; 245a–c; 283?)	01533
deest	BC; D 5a	1707 (Kei) before 1713 (JSB)	Passion Jesus Christus ist um unsrer Missetat willen verwundet (St Mark Passion pastiche, Weimar version)		SATB 2Vl 2Va Hc		II/9: 69	Pasticcio (Keiser G.?, Bach)	01534
deest	BC; D 5b	1726-04-19 (JSB)	Passion Jesus Christus ist um unsrer Missetat willen verwundet (St Mark Passion pastiche, 1st Leipzig version)		SATB 2Vl 2Va Org		II/9	Pasticcio after BC D 5a (Keiser G.?, Bach) adding BWV 500a and 1084)	01535
deest	BC; D 10	c.1750?	Passion Wer ist der, so von Edom kömmt	D min.	satbSSATB 2Fl 2Ob Str Bc		I/41: 95	Pasticcio (Graun, C. H.; Telemann; Bach; ...)	10991
deest (8/6*)	BC F 131 .1c	c. 1735	chorale setting "Liebster Gott, wenn werd ich sterben"	E♭ maj.	SATB		III/2.1: 100	after Z 6634; text by Neumann	11072
	BGA	1725 (JSB)	Notebook A. M. Bach (1725) No. 21 Menuet fait par Mons. Böhm	G maj.	Keyboard	43^{2}: 35	V/4: 82	by Böhm	
	BNB; I/B /48	1709 (Bas.) c.1738 (JSB)	6 Masses without Benedictus and Agnus Dei from Acroama missale		2SATB 3Tbn Str Bc			by Bassani; copied by Bach (BNB I/B/48), later adding BWV 1081	08834
	BNB; I/C/1	1740–1742 (JSB)	Magnificat	C maj.	SATB 4Tbn Tmp Bc			by Caldara; → BWV 1082; in DBB 2755/1	08841
deest	BNB; I/K/2	before 1719 (Han.); 1743–1748 (JSB)	Passion Jesus Christus ist um unsrer Missetat willen verwundet (St Mark Passion pastiche, 2nd Leipzig version)		stSATB 2Ob 2Bas 2Vl 2Va Vc Vne Hc		II/9	Pasticcio after BC D 5b (Keiser G.?, Bach) and HWV 48/9 /23 /41 /44 /47 /52 /55 (Handel)	01680
deest	NBA	1591 (Pal.) c.1742 (JSB)	Kyrie–Gloria Mass arranged from Missa sine nomine a 6	E min.	SSATTB 2Co 4Tro Vne Hc Org		II/9: 13	by Palestrina after anon. motet Beata Dei genitrix; arr. by Bach	01676
	NBA	1720-01-22	Klavierbüchlein WFB, p. 3a: Claves signatae (introduction on clefs)			45^{1}: 213	V/5		
	NBA	1720-01-22	Klavierbüchlein WFB, p. 3b: Explication... (introduction on ornaments)			45^{1}: 213	V/5		
	NBA	1720 (WFB)	Klavierbüchlein WFB No. 25: Pièce pour le Clavecin		Keyboard	45^{1}: 218	V/5: 40	by Richter, J. C.	
deest	NBA	1720 (anon)	Klavierbüchlein WFB No. 30: Bass sketch	G min.		45^{1}: 220	V/5: 45		
	NBA	1720 (WFB)	Klavierbüchlein WFB No. 48^{a–d}: Partita		Keyboard	45^{1}: 223	V/5: 82	by Stölzel	

Legend for abbreviations in "Scoring" column
Voices (see also SATB)
a	A	b	B	s	S	t	T	v			V	
alto (solo part)	alto (choir part)	bass (solo part)	bass (choir part)	soprano (solo part)	soprano (choir part)	tenor (solo part)	tenor (choir part)	voice (includes parts for unspecified voices or instruments as in some canons)			vocal music for unspecified voice type	
Winds and battery (bold = soloist)
Bas	Bel	Cnt	Fl	Hn	Ob	Oba	Odc	Tai	Tbn	Tdt	Tmp	Tr
bassoon (can be part of Bc, see below)	bell(s) (musical bells)	cornett, cornettino	flute (traverso, flauto dolce, piccolo, flauto basso)	natural horn, corno da caccia, corno da tirarsi, lituo	oboe	oboe d'amore	oboe da caccia	taille	trombone	tromba da tirarsi	timpani	tromba (natural trumpet, clarino trumpet)
Strings and keyboard (bold = soloist)
Bc		Hc	Kb	Lu	Lw	Org	Str	Va	Vc	Vdg	Vl	Vne
basso continuo: Vdg, Hc, Vc, Bas, Org, Vne and/or Lu		harpsichord	keyboard (Hc, Lw, Org or clavichord)	lute, theorbo	Lautenwerck (lute-harpsichord)	organ (/man. = manualiter, without pedals)	strings: Vl I, Vl II and Va	viola(s), viola d'amore, violetta	violoncello, violoncello piccolo	viola da gamba	violin(s), violino piccolo	violone, violone grosso

=== By genre ===
==== Cantatas (BWV 1–224) ====
See #BWV Chapter 1 in the table above

In the 1950 first edition of the BWV the cantatas were largely listed according to their BGA number:

- BWV 1–200: Church cantatas
- BWV 201–216: Secular cantatas
- BWV 217–224: Cantatas with various issues (lost, incomplete, spurious, doubtful)

Additionally Anh. I of the first edition of the BWV started with a list of some 20 lost cantatas, while Anh. III of that edition listed a few cantata (movements) by other composers (Anh. 156–158).

BWV^{2a} added many more lost cantatas (BWV Anh. 190–199 and 209–212) and alternative versions to known works indicating (partially) lost cantatas or cantata versions, e.g. BWV 244a, the music of which was partially preserved in the St Matthew Passion, BWV 244.

==== Motets (BWV 225–231) ====
See #BWV Chapter 2 in the table above

There are over a dozen motets attributed to Bach, about half of which are authentic by all accounts:

- BWV 225–230 are the six compositions that have always been considered motets composed by Bach
- BWV 231 was later renumbered to BWV 28/2a, a variant of the second movement of cantata BWV 28
- BWV 118, published as a cantata in the 19th century, was later recategorised as a motet, following Bach's designation on the score.
- BWV Anh. 159–165 are motets with a doubtful or spurious assignation to Bach, the first of which is however most likely composed by Bach.

==== Liturgical works in Latin (BWV 232–243) ====
See #BWV Chapter 3 in the table above

Bach's involvement with Latin church music, as composer, arranger or copyist, includes:

- BWV 232–242: Masses and Mass movements (Mass in B minor; Kyrie–Gloria Masses; separate Mass movements)
- BWV 243: Magnificat
- BWV 1081–1083: later additions to the BWV catalogue
- BWV Anh. 24–30, 166–168: doubtful and spurious works
- BNB I/B/48, I/C/1, I/P/2: copies and arrangements

==== Passions and oratorios (BWV 244–249) ====
See #BWV Chapter 4 in the table above

Passions and oratorios composed or contributed to by Bach include:

- BWV 244–247: Passions (St Matthew Passion; St John Passion; St Luke Passion; St Mark Passion)
- BWV 248–249: Oratorios (Christmas Oratorio; Easter Oratorio)
- BWV 11: Ascension Oratorio
- BWV 127/1, 500a, 1084, 1088, deest: St Mark Passion (attributed to Keiser), Weimarer Passion, Wer ist der, so von Edom kömmt
- BWV Anh. 169: passion text by Picander (not set by Bach, apart from using some parts of this text in his St Matthew Passion)

==== Four-part chorales (BWV 250–438) ====
See #BWV Chapter 5 in the table above

Bach's chorale settings (usually for SATB choir) are included in:

- BWV 250–438: separate chorale settings
- Cantatas (most prominently in the chorale cantatas), motets, passions, oratorios, Second Notebook for Anna Magdalena Bach
- BWV 1089, 1122–1126: later additions to the BWV catalogue
- BWV Anh. 31, 201–204: doubtful and spurious

==== Songs and arias (BWV 439–524) ====
See #BWV Chapter 6 in the table above

Songs and (separate) arias by Bach are included in several collections:

- BWV 439–507: Schemellis Gesangbuch
- BWV 508–518: Second Notebook for Anna Magdalena Bach
- BWV 519–523: D-B Mus. ms. Bach P 802, a manuscript by Johann Ludwig Krebs
- BWV Anh. 32–39: Deutsche Übersetzungen und Gedichte (doubtful)
- BWV Anh. 40–41: Singende Muse an der Pleiße (doubtful)

Associated with the Songs and Arias group:

- BWV 524: (Wedding) Quodlibet for four voices (incomplete)
- BWV 1127: "Alles mit Gott und nichts ohn' ihn" (strophic aria rediscovered in 2005)

==== Works for organ (BWV 525–771) ====
See #BWV Chapter 7 in the table above

Bach's organ compositions include:

- BWV 525–530: Sonatas
- BWV 531–582: compositions of the type Prelude/Fantasia/Toccata/Adagio/Passacaglia or Fugue
- BWV 583–591: various free organ compositions (Trios/Aria/Canzona/Allabreve/Pastorale/Kleines harmonisches Labyrinth )
- BWV 592–597: Concertos (transcriptions)
- BWV 598: Pedal-Exercitium
- BWV 599–764: Chorale preludes (Orgelbüchlein; Schübler Chorales; Great Eighteen Chorale Preludes or Leipzig Chorales; Chorale preludes from Clavier-Übung III; Kirnberger chorale preludes; other chorale preludes)
- BWV 765–768: Chorale partitas
- BWV 769–771: Chorale variations (includes Canonic Variations on "Vom Himmel hoch da komm' ich her")
- BWV 1085–1087, 1121, 1128: various later additions to the BWV catalogue
- BWV 1090–1120: Neumeister Chorales
- BWV Anh. 42–79, 171–178, 200, 206, 208, 213: lost, doubtful and spurious organ pieces

==== Works for keyboard (BWV 772–994) ====
See #BWV Chapter 8 in the table above

Bach's works for harpsichord, clavichord and other keyboard instruments include:

- BWV 772–801: Inventions and Sinfonias
- BWV 802–805: Duets from Clavier-Übung III
- BWV 806–845: Suites and suite movements (English Suites; French Suites; Partitas = Clavier-Übung I; Overture in the French style from Clavier-Übung II; etc.)
- BWV 846–893: The Well-Tempered Clavier (book I, book II)
- BWV 894–962: compositions of the type Prelude/Fantasia/Concerto/Toccata or Fugue/Fughetta (includes Chromatic Fantasia and Fugue, Six Little Preludes, several parts of the Klavierbüchlein für Wilhelm Friedemann Bach, etc.)
- BWV 963–970: Sonatas and sonata movements
- BWV 971–987: Concertos (includes Italian Concerto from Clavier-Übung II and various concerto transcriptions)
- BWV 988–991: Variations (includes Goldberg Variations = Clavier-Übung IV and Aria variata alla maniera italiana)
- BWV 992–994: Capriccios and Applicatio (includes Capriccio on the departure of a beloved brother)

==== Works for solo lute (BWV 995–1000) ====
See #BWV Chapter 9 in the table above

Bach's compositions for lute or lute-harpsichord (Lautenwerck) include:

- BWV 995–1000 suites and separate movements for lute or lute-harpsichord
- BWV 1006a: transcription of BWV 1006

==== Chamber music (BWV 1001–1040) ====
See #BWV Chapter 10 in the table above

Bach wrote chamber music for solo violin, cello or flute, sonatas for harpsichord and an instrumental soloist, and trio sonatas:

- BWV 1001–1006: Sonatas and partitas for solo violin
- BWV 1007–1012: Cello Suites
- BWV 1013: Partita for solo flute
- BWV 1014–1026: works for accompanied violin (sonatas, suite for violin and harpsichord; sonatas, fugue for violin and basso continuo)
- BWV 1027–1029: sonatas for viola da gamba and harpsichord
- BWV 1030–1035: sonatas for accompanied flute (sonatas for flute and harpsichord; sonatas for flute and basso continuo)
- BWV 1036–1040: trio sonatas

==== Orchestral works (BWV 1041–1071) ====
See #BWV Chapter 11 in the table above

Bach wrote concertos and orchestral suites:

- BWV 1041–1045: Violin concertos (in A minor, in E major, Double Concerto); Triple Concerto; Concerto movement/Sinfonia fragment
- BWV 1046–1051: Brandenburg Concertos
- BWV 1052–1065: Harpsichord concertos
- BWV 1066–1071: Orchestral suites and Sinfonia (early version of BWV 1046)

==== Canons (BWV 1072–1078) ====
See #BWV Chapter 12 in the table above

Separate canons by Bach are listed in the 12th chapter of the BWV:

- BWV 1072–1078: canons
- BWV 1086–1087: later additions

==== Late contrapuntal works (BWV 1079–1080) ====
See #BWV Chapter 13 in the table above

The list of late contrapuntal works contains only two items:

- BWV 1079: The Musical Offering
- BWV 1080: The Art of Fugue

=== 20th-century additions to the BWV catalogue and Anhang ===
Additions as published in BWV^{2a}

==== Additions to the main catalogue (BWV 1081–1126) ====
- BWV 1081 – Credo in unum Deum in F major (for choir), included in Chapter 3 in BWV^{2a}
- BWV 1082 – Suscepit Israel by Antonio Caldara (for choir), as copied by Bach; Included in Chapter 3 in BWV^{2a}
- BWV 1083 – Tilge, Höchster, meine Sünden (motet, "parody", i.e., reworked version, of Pergolesi's Stabat Mater), included in Chapter 3 in BWV^{2a}
- BWV 1084 – O hilf, Christe, Gottes Sohn (chorale from Bach's Leipzig versions of the St Mark Passion attributed to Keiser), included in Chapter 5 in BWV^{2a}
- BWV 1085 – O Lamm Gottes, unschuldig (chorale prelude), included in Chapter 7 in BWV^{2a}
- BWV 1086 – Canon Concordia discors, included in Chapter 12 in BWV^{2a}
- BWV 1087 – 14 canons on the First Eight Notes of Goldberg Variations Ground (discovered 1974), included in Chapter 12 in BWV^{2a}
- BWV 1088 – "So heb ich denn mein Auge sehnlich auf" (arioso for bass), No. 20 in Wer ist der, so von Edom kömmt (pasticcio Passion oratorio); Included in Chapter 4 in BWV^{2a}
- BWV 1089 – Da Jesus an dem Kreutze stund (four-part chorale), included in Chapter 5 in BWV^{2a}
- BWV 1090–1120 – 31 chorale preludes for organ from the Neumeister Collection, discovered in 1985 in the archives of the Yale University library; Included in Chapter 7 in BWV^{2a}, except for BWV 1096, attributed to Johann Pachelbel, which was moved to Anh. III (spurious works).
- BWV 1121, previously Anh. 205 – Fantasie in C minor (organ), included in Chapter 7 in BWV^{2a}
- BWV 1122–1126 – five four-part chorales, moved to Chapter 5 in BWV^{2a}

==== Additions to the Anhang (BWV Anh. 190–213) ====
BWV Anh. 190–213 were added between the 1950 and 1990s editions of the catalogue

- BWV Anh. 190–197 – Cantatas added to Anh. I (music lost); see also List of Bach cantatas
- BWV Anh. 198 – Abandoned sketch of a cantata opening, renumbered to BWV 149/1a and added to Chapter 1 in BWV^{2a}
- BWV Anh. 199 – Cantata added to Anh. I (music lost); see also List of Bach cantatas
- BWV Anh. 200 – Fragment of a chorale prelude O Traurigkeit, o herzeleid, added to Anh. I (unused sketch for the Orgelbüchlein)
- BWV Anh. 201–204 – Four-part chorales added to Anh. II (doubtful)
- BWV Anh. 205 – Fantasia in C minor, authenticated as BWV 1121 and added to Chapter 7 in BWV^{2a}
- BWV Anh. 206 – Doubtful chorale prelude, added to Anh. II
- BWV Anh. 207 – Doubtful keyboard fugue, added to Anh. II
- BWV Anh. 208 – Spurious organ fugue, added to Anh. III
- BWV Anh. 209–212 – Lost cantatas added to Anh. I; see also List of Bach cantatas
- BWV Anh. 213 – Lost arrangement for organ of an unidentified Telemann concerto, added to Anh. I

=== 21st-century additions to the BWV catalogue (BWV 1127 and higher) ===
See also #BWV Later in the table above

BWV numbers assigned after the publication of BWV^{2a}:

- BWV 1127: strophic aria "Alles mit Gott und nichts ohn' ihn" (discovered June 2005)
- BWV Anh. 71, renumbered to BWV 1128: chorale fantasia for organ "Wo Gott der Herr nicht bei uns hält" (BWV Anh. II 71 was authenticated as a composition by Bach after Wilhelm Rust's 1877 copy was recovered in March 2008)
- BWV 1129 and higher: BWV^{3} numbers, see BWV#Numbers above BWV 1126

== Derivative works ==
There is not much system in the way works derived from Bach's compositions are listed. The "R" addition to the BWV number is only well-established for the reconstructions included in NBA VII/7 (e.g. solo violin reconstructions of BWV 565 are not usually indicated as BWV 565R, neither is the system used for reconstructed vocal works). For some series of transcriptions and arrangements works catalogues of these transcribers/arrangers may hold sublists with works derived from compositions by Bach.

=== Reconstructed concertos ===
See also #Reconstructions in the table above

Each reconstructed concerto is created after the harpsichord concerto for the presumed original instrument. Such reconstructions are commonly referred to as, for example, BWV 1052R (where the R stands for 'reconstructed'). Other reconstructions and completions of for instance BWV 1059 have been indicated as BWV 1059, or BWV 1059a.

=== Adaptations ===
Transcriptions and arrangements in the catalogues of works by other composers include:

Ferruccio Busoni
Catalogue numbers BV B 20 to B 46 are arrangements of works by Bach, many of which published in the Bach-Busoni Editions.

== See also ==
- List of compositions by Johann Sebastian Bach printed during his lifetime
- List of fugal works by Johann Sebastian Bach
