= List of motets by Johann Sebastian Bach =

Vocal compositions by German composer

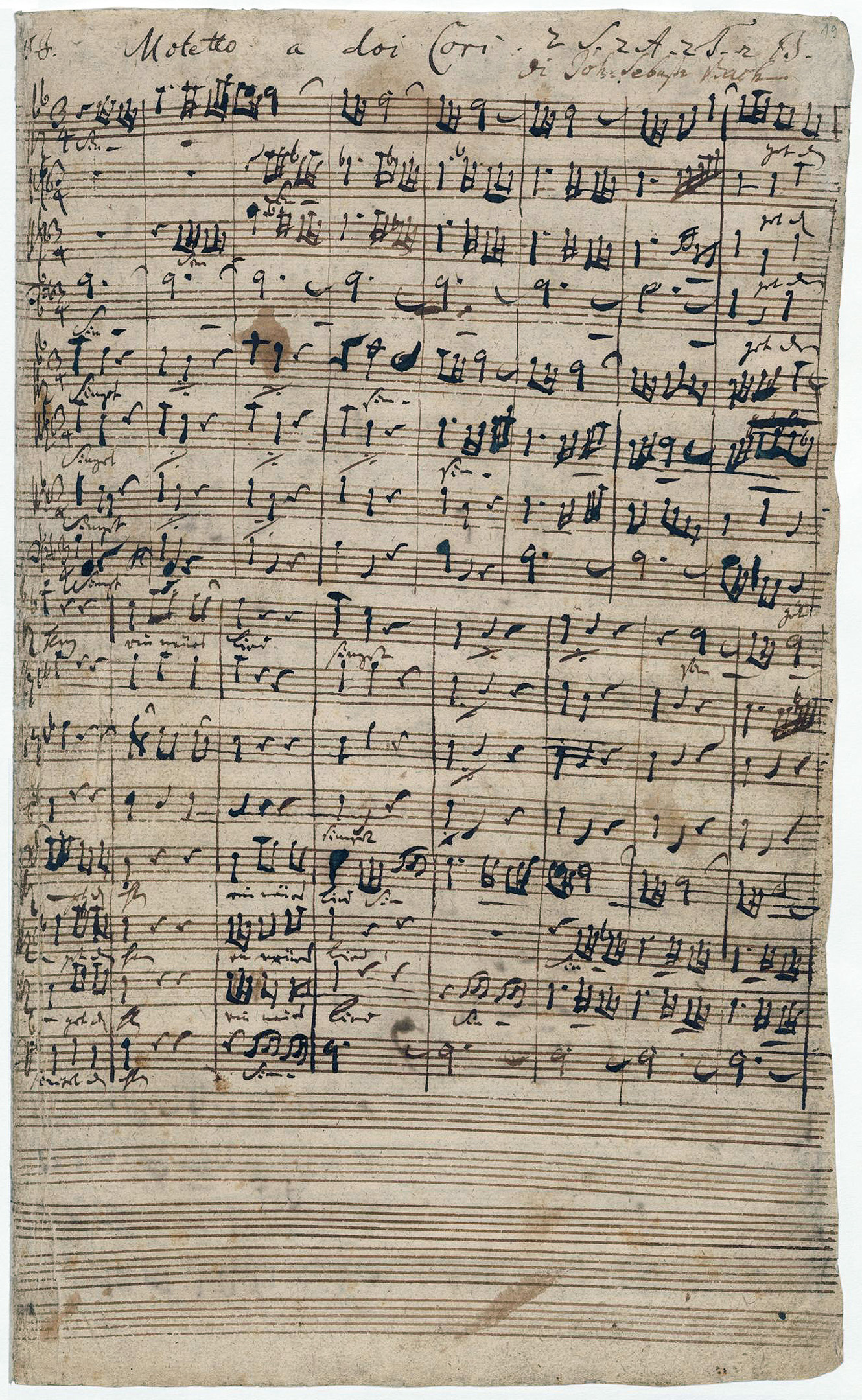
Bach's autograph of the motet Singet dem Herrn ein neues Lied, BWV 225

It is uncertain how many motets Johann Sebastian Bach composed, because some have been lost, and there are some doubtful attributions among the surviving ones associated with him. There is a case for regarding the six motets catalogued BWV 225–230 as being authenticated, although there is some doubt about one of them, Lobet den Herrn, alle Heiden. A seventh motet, Ich lasse dich nicht, BWV Anh. 159, which was formerly attributed to Bach's older cousin Johann Christoph Bach, appears to be at least partly by J.S. Bach, and if so was probably composed during his Weimar period.

BWV 228 is another motet which appears to have been written at Weimar, between 1708 and 1717, the others having been composed in Leipzig. Several of the motets were written for funerals. There is some uncertainty as to the extent that motets would have been called for in normal church services—there is evidence that the form was considered archaic. The text of Jauchzet dem Herrn, alle Welt, BWV Anh. 160 (whether or not the piece is attributable to Bach) suggests a performance at Christmas. Another possible use is a pedagogical one. Bach's biographer Johann Nikolaus Forkel suggested that the choral writing would have been useful for training Bach's young singers, and Christoph Wolff has argued that this could apply in particular to Singet dem Herrn ein neues Lied.

Bach's motets are his only vocal works that stayed in the canon without interruption between his death in 1750 and the 19th-century Bach Revival. In the early 19th century, six motets (BWV 225, 228, Anh. 159, 229, 227, 226) were among Bach's first printed music, after the second half of the 18th century when the only vocal music by Bach that was printed were collections of his four-part chorales.

== BWV 225–230 ==
- Singet dem Herrn ein neues Lied (Sing unto the Lord a new song), BWV 225, is a motet in B♭ major scored for two four-part choirs (SATB) which was first performed in Leipzig around 1727. This motet uses Psalm 149:1–3 for its first movement, the third stanza of "Nun lob, mein Seel, den Herren" (a 1530 hymn after Psalm 103 by Johann Gramann) for the second movement, and Psalm 150:2 and 6 for its third movement.
- Der Geist hilft unser Schwachheit auf (The Spirit gives aid to our weakness), BWV 226, a motet in B♭ major scored for two four-part choirs, was performed in Leipzig in 1729 for the funeral of Johann Heinrich Ernesti. The text is taken from the Epistle to the Romans (Romans 8:26–27) and Martin Luther's third stanza to the hymn "Komm, Heiliger Geist, Herre Gott" (1524).
- Jesu, meine Freude (Jesus, my joy), BWV 227, is a motet in E minor for five vocal parts. It has been suggested that it was composed in 1723 for the funeral of Johanna Maria Käsin, the wife of the Leipzig postmaster. It takes its title from the hymn "Jesu, meine Freude" by Johann Franck on which it is based. The stanzas of the chorale are interspersed with passages from the Epistle to the Romans. The chorale melody on which several movements are based was by Johann Crüger (1653). The German text is by Johann Franck, and dates from c. 1650.
- Fürchte dich nicht (Do not fear), BWV 228, is a motet in A major for a funeral, set for double chorus and unspecified instruments playing colla parte. The work in two movements draws its text from the Book of Isaiah and a hymn by Paul Gerhardt. Traditionally, scholars believed that Bach composed it in Leipzig in 1726, while more recent scholarship suggests for stylistic reasons that it was composed during Bach's Weimar period. It has been compared to another motet for double choir, Ich lasse dich nicht, BWV Anh. 159, which is possibly by Bach.
- Komm, Jesu, komm (Come, Jesus, come), BWV 229, is a motet in G minor composed in Leipzig, which received its first performance by 1731–1732.
- Lobet den Herrn, alle Heiden (Praise the Lord, all ye heathen), BWV 230, is a motet in C major scored for four voices, which draws its text from Psalm 117:1–2. Although some scholars have expressed doubts about the attribution to Bach, the work is generally regarded as a surviving motet by Bach.

== BWV 28/2a (231) and 118 ==
- Sei Lob und Preis mit Ehren, originally BWV 231, later renumbered to BWV 28/2a, is the second movement of the motet Jauchzet dem Herrn alle Welt, presented as a separate motet. Whether Bach extracted this motet (which is based on the second movement of the cantata BWV 28) from the three-movement motet or the cantata, and/or used it as a separate motet is not known.
- O Jesu Christ, meins Lebens Licht, BWV 118: originally listed as a cantata, in BWV^{2a} listed as a (funeral) motet.

== Parodies ==
- Der Gerechte kömmt um, BWV 1149, a chorale from a pasticcio passion oratorio, is a parody of the motet Tristis est anima mea which was likely composed by Johann Kuhnau. The arrangement is possibly Bach's, and it is possible Bach used it as a separate (funeral) motet.

== BWV Anh. 159–165 ==
- Ich lasse dich nicht (I will not let you go [unless you bless me]), BWV Anh. 159, is a motet in F minor scored for double chorus (SATB–SATB) and unspecified instruments playing colla parte. The motet, which was formerly attributed to Bach's older cousin Johann Christoph Bach, appears to be one of Bach's earlier works, possibly composed during his Weimar period around 1712. Consequently, the motet was moved from BWV Anh. III (spurious works) to BWV Anh. II (doubtful works) in BWV^{2a}. The final chorale of the motet is an adaptation of BWV 421, but that may also be a later addition to the motet. It draws its text from a verse taken from the Book of Genesis, from the scene of Jacob's Ladder (Genesis 32:27), combined with the third stanza of the hymn "Warum betrübst du dich, mein Herz" by Erasmus Alberus.
- Jauchzet dem Herrn alle Welt, BWV Anh. 160 (=TWV 8:10) is a three-movement pasticcio motet for SATB–SATB attributed to, among others, Bach and Georg Philipp Telemann. All that is certain regarding Bach's participation in the work is that its second movement derives from the second movement of Bach's cantata BWV 28.
- Motet movement Kündlich groß ist das gottselige Geheimnis, BWV Anh. 161, in D major for SATB, strings(?) and continuo, by Graun (possibly Carl Heinrich Graun), precedes laudes A and B of Bach's Magnificat in a three-movement Christmas motet pasticcio.
- Lob und Ehre und Weisheit und Dank, BWV Anh. 162, for SATB–SATB, by Georg Gottfried Wagner.
- Merk auf, mein Herz, und sieh dorthin, BWV Anh. 163, for SATB–SATB, by Johann Bernhard or Johann Ernst Bach.
- Nun danket alle Gott, BWV Anh. 164, for SSATB, by Johann Christoph Altnickol, Bach's son-in-law.
- Unser Wandel ist im Himmel, BWV Anh. 165, for SATB, after movements 2, 4 and 6 of cantata Mein Odem ist schwach, BWV 222, by Johann Ernst Bach.

== Motets listed in the second chapter of the Bach-Werke-Verzeichnis (1998) ==
Legend to the table
column		content
1	BWV	Bach-Werke-Verzeichnis (lit. 'Bach-works-catalogue'; BWV) numbers. Anhang (Annex; Anh.) numbers are indicated as follows: preceded by I: in Anh. I (lost works) of BWV^{1} (1950 first edition of the BWV); preceded by II: in Anh. II (doubtful works) of BWV^{1}; preceded by III: in Anh. III (spurious works) of BWV^{1}; preceded by N: new Anh. numbers in BWV^{2} (1990) and/or BWV^{2a} (1998)
2	^{2a}	Section in which the composition appears in BWV^{2a}: Chapters of the main catalogue indicated by Arabic numerals (1-13); Anh. sections indicated by Roman numerals (I–III); Reconstructions published in the NBE indicated by "R"
3	Date	Date associated with the completion of the listed version of the composition. Exact dates (e.g. for most cantatas) usually indicate the assumed date of first (public) performance. When the date is followed by an abbreviation in brackets (e.g. JSB for Johann Sebastian Bach) it indicates the date of that person's involvement with the composition as composer, scribe or publisher.
4	Name	Name of the composition: if the composition is known by a German incipit, that German name is preceded by the composition type (e.g. cantata, chorale prelude, motet, ...)
5	Key	Key of the composition
6	Scoring	See scoring table below for the abbreviations used in this column
7	BG	Bach Gesellschaft-Ausgabe (BG edition; BGA): numbers before the colon indicate the volume in that edition. After the colon an Arabic numeral indicates the page number where the score of the composition begins, while a Roman numeral indicates a description of the composition in the Vorwort (Preface) of the volume.
8	NBE	New Bach Edition (German: Neue Bach-Ausgabe, NBA): Roman numerals for the series, followed by a slash, and the volume number in Arabic numerals. A page number, after a colon, refers to the "Score" part of the volume. Without such page number, the composition is only described in the "Critical Commentary" part of the volume. The volumes group Bach's compositions by genre: 1. Cantatas (Vol. 1–34: church cantatas grouped by occasion; Vol. 35–40: secular cantatas; Vol. 41: Varia); 2. Masses, Passions, Oratorios (12 volumes); 3. Motets, Chorales, Lieder (4 volumes); 4. Organ Works (11 volumes); 5. Keyboard and Lute Works (14 volumes); 6. Chamber Music (5 volumes); 7. Orchestral Works (7 volumes); 8. Canons, Musical Offering, Art of Fugue (3 volumes); 9. Addenda (approximately 7 volumes)
9	Additional info	may include: "after" – indicating a model for the composition; "by" – indicating the composer of the composition (if different from Johann Sebastian Bach); "in" – indicating the oldest known source for the composition; "pasticcio" – indicating a composition with parts of different origin; "see" – composition renumbered in a later edition of the BWV; "text" – by text author, or, in source; Provenance of standard texts and tunes, such as Lutheran hymns and their chorale melodies, Latin liturgical texts (e.g. Magnificat) and common tunes (e.g. Folia), are not usually indicated in this column. For an overview of such resources used by Bach, see individual composition articles, and overviews in, e.g., Chorale cantata (Bach)#Bach's chorale cantatas, List of chorale harmonisations by Johann Sebastian Bach#Chorale harmonisations in various collections and List of organ compositions by Johann Sebastian Bach#Chorale Preludes.
10	BD	Bach Digital Work page

Legend for abbreviations in "Scoring" column
Voices (see also SATB)
a	A	b	B	s	S	t	T	v			V	
alto (solo part)	alto (choir part)	bass (solo part)	bass (choir part)	soprano (solo part)	soprano (choir part)	tenor (solo part)	tenor (choir part)	voice (includes parts for unspecified voices or instruments as in some canons)			vocal music for unspecified voice type	
Winds and battery (bold = soloist)
Bas	Bel	Cnt	Fl	Hn	Ob	Oba	Odc	Tai	Tbn	Tdt	Tmp	Tr
bassoon (can be part of Bc, see below)	bell(s) (musical bells)	cornett, cornettino	flute (traverso, flauto dolce, piccolo, flauto basso)	natural horn, corno da caccia, corno da tirarsi, lituo	oboe	oboe d'amore	oboe da caccia	taille	trombone	tromba da tirarsi	timpani	tromba (natural trumpet, clarino trumpet)
Strings and keyboard (bold = soloist)
Bc		Hc	Kb	Lu	Lw	Org	Str	Va	Vc	Vdg	Vl	Vne
basso continuo: Vdg, Hc, Vc, Bas, Org, Vne and/or Lu		harpsichord	keyboard (Hc, Lw, Org or clavichord)	lute, theorbo	Lautenwerck (lute-harpsichord)	organ (/man. = manualiter, without pedals)	strings: Vl I, Vl II and Va	viola(s), viola d'amore, violetta	violoncello, violoncello piccolo	viola da gamba	violin(s), violino piccolo	violone, violone grosso

Background colours
Colour	Meaning
green	extant or clearly documented partial or complete manuscript (copy) by Bach and/or first edition under Bach's supervision
yellow	extant or clearly documented manuscript (copy) or print edition, in whole or in part, by close relative, i.e. brother (J. Christoph), wife (A. M.), son (W. F. / C. P. E. / J. C. F. / J. Christian) or son-in-law (Altnickol)
orange-brown	extant or clearly documented manuscript (copy) by close friend and/or pupil (Kellner, Krebs, Kirnberger, Walther, ...), or distant family member

Motets listed in Chapter 2 of BWV^{2a}
BWV	^{2a}	Date	Name	Key	Scoring	BG	NBE	Additional info	BD
225	2.	1726–1727; New Year?	Motet Singet dem Herrn ein neues Lied	B♭ maj.	2SATB (+colla parte instr.?)	39: 3	III/1: 1	after Z 8244 (/2); text after Ps. 149: 1–3 (/1), by Gramann after Ps. 103 (/2), after Ps. 150: 2, 6 (/3)	00282
226	2.	1729-10-20	Motet Der Geist hilft unser Schwachheit auf (funeral of Ernesti, J. H.)	B♭ maj.	2SATB Str Vc 2Ob Tai Bas	39: 39, 143	III/1: 37	after Z 7445a (/2); text after Rom. 8: 26–27 (/1), by Luther (/2)	00283
226/2	2.	1729-10-20	chorale setting "Komm, Heiliger Geist, Herre Gott" (s. 3)	B♭ maj. G maj.	SATB	39: 57	III/2.1: 18; III/2.2: 38	after Z 7445a; text by Luther	11182
227	2.	c. 1723–1735	Motet Jesu, meine Freude	E min.	SSATB (+colla parte instr.?)	39: 59	III/1: 75	after Z 8032 (odd mvts); text by Franck, J. (odd mvts), after Rom. 8: 1–2, 9–11 (even mvts)	00284
227/1; 227/11	2.	c. 1723–1735	chorale setting "Jesu, meine Freude" (ss. 1, 6)	E min.	SATB	39: 61	III/2.1: 27; III/2.2: 156	after Z 8032; text by Franck, J.	11200
227/3	2.	c. 1723–1735	chorale setting "Jesu, meine Freude" (s. 2)	E min.	SATB	39: 66	III/2.1: 28	after Z 8032; text by Franck, J.	11201
227/7	2.	c. 1723–1735	chorale setting "Jesu, meine Freude" (s. 4)	E min.	SATB	39: 75	III/2.1: 22; III/2.2: 168	after Z 8032; text by Franck, J.	11202
228	2.	c. 1715	Motet Fürchte dich nicht	A maj.	2SATB (+colla parte instr.?)	39: 85	III/1: 105	after Z 6461 (/2); text after Is. 41: 10 (/1), 43: 1 (/2), by Gerhardt (/2)	00285
229	2.	before 1731–1732	Motet Komm, Jesu, komm	G min.	2SATB (+colla parte instr.)	39: 107	III/1: 125	text by Thymich	00286
230	2.	1723–1739?	Motet Lobet den Herrn, alle Heiden	C maj.	SATB Bc (+colla parte instr.?)	39: 127	III/1: 147	text after Ps. 117	00287
231								see BWV 28/2a	00288
118.1	2.	1736–1737	Motet O Jesu Christ, meins Lebens Licht (funeral)	B♭ maj.	SATB 2Hn Cnt 3Tbn	24: 185	III/1: 163	text by Behm; → BWV 118.2	00143
118.2	2.	1746–1747	Motet O Jesu Christ, meins Lebens Licht (funeral)	B♭ maj.	SATB 2Ob Tai Bas 2Hn Str Bc	NBG 17^{1}	III/1: 171	text by Behm; after BWV 118.1	11121

== Publication and recording ==
=== Publications ===
St. Thomas School, Leipzig, appears to have kept the motets in the repertory of its Thomanerchor after Bach's death. It is documented that the choir performed Singet dem Herrn for Mozart in 1789. The director on this occasion was the Thomaskantor Johann Friedrich Doles, a pupil of Bach. The interest in Bach motets was sufficient for six of them to be printed for the first time in 1802/1803. They appeared in two volumes from the Leipzig publisher Breitkopf & Härtel. The editor is not credited on the title page; however, it has been suggested that the person responsible was Johann Gottfried Schicht, who was active in the city as a choral and orchestral conductor.

Book I consisted of

- Singet dem Herrn ein neues Lied (BWV 225)
- Fürchte dich nicht (BWV 228)
- Ich lasse dich nicht (BWV Anh. 159)

Book II consisted of

- Komm, Jesu, komm (BWV 229)
- Jesu, meine Freude (BWV 227)
- Der Geist hilft unser Schwachheit auf (BWV 226)

In 1892 the motets were published as part of the Bach-Gesellschaft-Ausgabe, the first edition of the composer's complete works. The editor was Franz Wüllner, who did not accept Bach's authorship of Ich lasse dich nicht. The motet volume of the New Bach Edition (the second edition of the composer's complete works) came out in 1965. It includes O Jesu Christ, mein Lebens Licht (which had been included among the cantatas in the Bach-Gesellschaft-Ausgabe) and Lobet den Herrn. The motets were published by Carus-Verlag in 1975, edited by Günter Graulich, and again in 2003, seven compositions edited by Uwe Wolf.

=== Recordings ===
Most recordings of the Bach motets have been made since the Second World War. The Thomanerchor, for example, recorded a set in the 1950s. However, there were several pre-War recordings of the motets. The first recording of a Bach motet was a 1927 version of Jesu, meine Freude.

A single CD can contain the set of six motets (BWV 225–230) plus other works. One of the decisions which needs to be made is which motets to include. Another decision is how many voices to use per part. The motets have been recorded with one voice per part by Konrad Junghänel. Most recordings deploy more than one singer per part; for example, Masaaki Suzuki and his Bach Collegium Japan use a chorus of eighteen singers.

== Sources ==
- Dürr, Alfred; Kobayashi, Yoshitake, eds. (1998). Bach Werke Verzeichnis: Kleine Ausgabe – Nach der von Wolfgang Schmieder vorgelegten 2. Ausgabe [Bach Works Catalogue: Small Edition – After Wolfgang Schmieder's 2nd edition] (in German). Kirsten Beißwenger (collaborator). (BWV^{2a} ed.). Wiesbaden: Breitkopf & Härtel. ISBN 9783765102493. Preface in English and German.
- Melamed, Daniel R. (1995). J.S. Bach and the German Motet. Cambridge University Press. ISBN 0-52-141864-X.
- Platen, Emil (1961). "Eine Pergolesi-Bearbeitung Bachs" [An arrangement of Pergolesi by Bach]. In Dürr, Alfred; Neumann, Werner (eds.). Bach-Jahrbuch 1961 [Bach Yearbook 1961]. Bach-Jahrbuch (in German). Vol. 48. Berlin: Evangelische Verlagsanstalt (published 1962). pp. 35–51. doi:10.13141/bjb.v1961. Digital version at Qucosa.
- Wolf, Uwe, ed. (2002). "Johann Sebastian Bach / Motetten / Motets" (PDF). Carus-Verlag. p. V.
