= Klaus Hofmann =

German musicologist (born 1939)

- Born: 20 March 1939 (age 87); Würzburg, Germany
- Education: University of Erlangen; Albert-Ludwigs-University Freiburg
- Occupation: Musicologist

Klaus Hofmann (born 20 March 1939) is a German musicologist, who is an expert on the music of Johann Sebastian Bach.

Born in Würzburg, Hofmann studied after graduation (1958) from 1958 to 1959 at the University of Erlangen. He then continued his studies at the Albert-Ludwigs-University Freiburg. In 1968 he received his doctorate with a dissertation "Untersuchungen zur Kompositionstechnik der Motette im 13. Jahrhundert, durchgeführt an den Motetten mit dem Tenor IN SECULUM" (Studies on the composition technique of the motet in the 13th century, performed on the motets with tenor IN SECULUM). From 1968 to 1978 he worked as an employee of the Hänssler Verlag. From 1978, he was a research assistant of the Johann Sebastian Bach Institute in Göttingen, one of the two institutions which prepared the Neue Bach-Ausgabe, the second complete edition of Bach's work. In 2004 he was appointed to the position of Executive Director, a position which he held until the Institute closed in 2006.

He is a board member of the copyright collective Verwertungsgesellschaft Musikedition. In 1994 he was appointed honorary professor at the Georg-August-Universität Göttingen.

== Selected publications ==
In 2003, he wrote a book on the motets by Bach, Johann Sebastian Bach. Die Motetten., published by Bärenreiter. He covered not only the five motets BWV 225 to 229, but also three works of more questionable attribution, Lobet den Herrn, alle Heiden, BWV 230 (generally agreed to be by Bach), Ich lasse dich nicht, BWV Anh. 159 (now assumed to be by Bach, but formerly regarded as spurious) and Jauchzet dem Herrn, alle Welt, BWV Anh. 160 (a pasticcio work). He divided his book in two parts, one dedicated to the facts and history of the works, the other to musical analysis.

For the music publisher Carus-Verlag, he edited Bach's Christmas Oratorio, supplying a foreword in three languages and a critical report of historical and musicological information. For Breitkopf & Härtel, he reconstructed a trio sonata for violin, viola and basso continuo, based on BWV 1038, and attributed it to both Johann Sebastian Bach and Carl Philipp Emanuel Bach.
