= Wer sich selbst erhöhet, der soll erniedriget werden, BWV 47 =

Church cantata by Johann Sebastian Bach

Wer sich selbst erhöhet, der soll erniedriget werden
- BWV 47
- Church cantata by J. S. Bach
- Nikolaikirche, 19th-century depiction
- Occasion: 17th Sunday after Trinity
- Cantata text: Johann Friedrich Helbig
- Bible text: Ephesians 4
- Chorale: "Warum betrübst du dich, mein Herz"
- Performed: 13 October 1726: Leipzig
- Movements: 5
- Vocal: SATB choir; soprano and bass soloists
- Instrumental: 2 oboes; 2 violins; viola; organ; continuo

Johann Sebastian Bach composed the church cantata Wer sich selbst erhöhet, der soll erniedriget werden (Whoever exalts himself, will be abased), BWV 47, in Leipzig for the 17th Sunday after Trinity and first performed it on 13 October 1726.

The cantata is the only work that Bach set to a cantata text by Johann Friedrich Helbig. The poet took the final line from the Gospel for the opening chorus and then focused on the warning of pride. The closing chorale is the eleventh and final stanza of the hymn "Warum betrübst du dich, mein Herz". Bach structured the cantata in five movements and scored it for soprano and bass solo, a four-part choir, and a Baroque instrumental ensemble of two oboes, strings, obbligato organ and basso continuo.

== History and words ==
Bach wrote the cantata in his fourth year as Thomaskantor in Leipzig for the 17th Sunday after Trinity. It is regarded as part of his third annual cycle of cantatas. The prescribed readings for the Sunday were from the Epistle to the Ephesians, the admonition to keep the unity of the Spirit (Ephesians 4:1–6), and from the Gospel of Luke, healing a man with dropsy on the Sabbath (Luke 14:1–11). The librettist Johann Friedrich Helbig (1680–1722) was a court poet at the ducal court of Saxe-Eisenach from 1718. He published an annual cycle of cantatas in 1720, Aufmunterung der Andacht (Encouragement of Devotion), which included this cantata. It is the only cantata text of Helbig which Bach set to music. It is not known whether Bach became acquainted with the text from the 1720 publication or rather via a composition by Georg Philipp Telemann, who composed several of Helbig's texts in Eisenach. The poet took the final line from the Gospel as a starting point in the first movement and then focused on the warning of pride, leading to a prayer for humility. The closing chorale is the eleventh and final stanza of the hymn "Warum betrübst du dich, mein Herz", which Bach had used in 1723 in his cantata Warum betrübst du dich, mein Herz, BWV 138.

Bach first performed the cantata on 13 October 1726 at the Nikolaikirche. Bach performed it again between 1736 and 1740, when some autograph revisions were added to the fourth movement. For another performance around 1742, a handwritten note called for a solo violin in the second movement instead of the organ.

== Scoring and structure ==
Bach structured the cantata in five movements and scored it for two vocal soloists (soprano and bass), a four-part choir, and a Baroque instrumental ensemble of two oboes (Ob), two violins (Vl), viola (Va), organ obbligato (Org) and basso continuo. Alfred Dürr gives the duration as 24 minutes in his book Die Kantaten von Johann Sebastian Bach.

Movements of Wer sich selbst erhöhet, der soll erniedriget werden, BWV 47
No.	Title	Type	Vocal	Winds	Strings	Organ	Key	Time
1	Wer sich selbst erhöhet, der soll erniedriget werden	Chorus	SATB	2Ob	2Vl, Va, Bc		G minor	cut time
2	Wer ein wahrer Christ will heißen	Aria	Soprano		Bc	Org (obbligato)	D minor	6/8
3	Der Mensch ist Kot, Stank, Asch und Erde	Recitative	Bass		2Vl, Va, Bc			common time
4	Jesu, beuge doch mein Herze	Aria	Bass	1Ob	1Vl, Bc		Eb major	common time
5	Der zeitlichen Ehrn will ich gern entbehrn	Chorale	SATB	2Ob (col Soprano)	1Vl (col Soprano), 1Vl (coll'Alto), Va (col Tenore), Bc		C minor	common time

== Music ==
The opening chorus is the most elaborate of the five movements. Bach used for the long ritornello music from his organ prelude in C minor, BWV 546, transposed to G minor. The oboes play a motif, rising in sequences, which becomes a vocal theme of a fugue, illustrating the haughty self-exaltation in the first half of the Gospel text. A countersubject moves in the opposite direction to illustrate the self-humiliation. The fugue is concluded by a homophonic "summary". The sequence of fugue and summary is repeated. Finally, the complete ritornello is repeated like a da capo, but with the voices additionally embedded, stating the complete text once more in homophony.

The soprano aria was originally accompanied by an obbligato organ, as was, three weeks later, the aria Ich geh und suche mit Verlangen, BWV 49. In a later performance of the cantata, Bach assigned the obbligato part to a violin. The da capo aria depicts humility in the first section, pride in the middle section, in rough rhythm both in the voice as in the obbligato, whereas the continuo plays the theme from the first section to unify the movement. John Eliot Gardiner describes the "harsh, stubborn broken chords" as illustrating arrogance. The only recitative, accompanied by the strings, is the central movement. Gardiner observes that Bach's "autograph score shows, for example, how he sharpened the rhythm of the word "Teufelsbrut" (devil's brood) to make its impact more abrupt and brutal." The second aria is in three parts, but without a vocal da capo. Oboe and violin are equal partners with the bass voice in a prayer for humility. The closing chorale is set for four parts in utmost humility.

== Recordings ==
- J. S. Bach: Cantata BWV 10, BWV 47; Sanctus BWV 241, Paul Steinitz, London Bach Society, English Chamber Orchestra, Sally Le Sage, Neil Howlett, Oryx 1965
- J. S. Bach: Cantata No. 47; W.A. Mozart: Missa Brevis, Rudolf Barshai, Yurlov Choir, Moscow Chamber Orchestra, Galina Pisarenko; Bass: Alexander Vedernikov, Melodiya 1966
- J. S. Bach: Das Kantatenwerk – Sacred Cantatas Vol. 3, Nikolaus Harnoncourt, Wiener Sängerknaben, Concentus Musicus Wien, soloist of the Wiener Sängerknaben, Ruud van der Meer, Teldec 1974
- Die Bach Kantate Vol. 53, Helmuth Rilling, Gächinger Kantorei, Bach-Collegium Stuttgart, Arleen Augér, Philippe Huttenlocher, Hänssler 1982
- Bach Edition Vol. 14 – Cantatas Vol. 7, Pieter Jan Leusink, Holland Boys Choir, Netherlands Bach Collegium, Ruth Holton, Bas Ramselaar, Brilliant Classics 2000
- Bach Cantatas Vol. 9: Lund / Leipzig / For the 17th Sunday after Trinity / For the 18th Sunday after Trinity, John Eliot Gardiner, Monteverdi Choir, English Baroque Soloists, Katharine Fuge, Stephan Loges, Soli Deo Gloria 2000
- J. S. Bach: Complete Cantatas Vol. 18, Ton Koopman, Amsterdam Baroque Orchestra & Choir, Sandrine Piau, Klaus Mertens, Antoine Marchand 2003
- J. S. Bach: Cantatas for the Complete Liturgical Year Vol. 12: "Warum betrübst du dich, mein Herz" - Cantatas BWV 138 · 27 · 47 · 96, Sigiswald Kuijken, La Petite Bande, Gerlinde Sämann, Petra Noskaiová, Christoph Genz, Jan van der Crabben, Accent 2009
- J. S. Bach: Cantatas Vol. 47 – Cantatas from Leipzig 1723, Masaaki Suzuki, Bach Collegium Japan, Hana Blažíková, Peter Kooy, BIS 2010
