= Motet =

Vocal composition in Western classical music

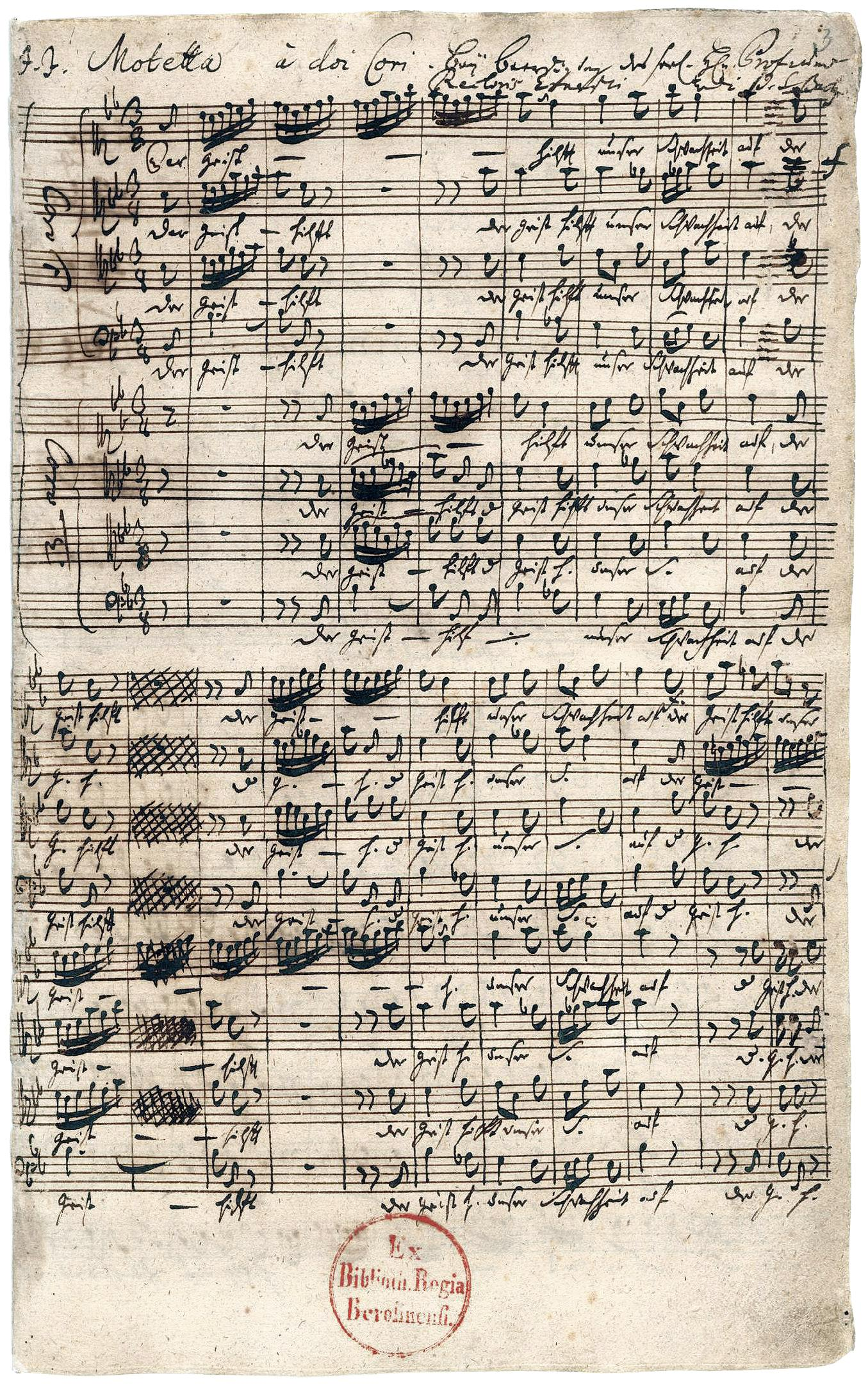
The first page from the manuscript of J. S. Bach's Baroque era motet, entitled Der Geist hilft unser Schwachheit auf (BWV226)

In Western classical music, a motet is mainly a vocal musical composition, of highly diverse form and style, from high medieval music to the present. The motet was one of the preeminent polyphonic forms of Renaissance music. According to the English musicologist Margaret Bent, "a piece of music in several parts with words" is as precise a definition of the motet as will serve from the 13th to the late 16th century and beyond. The late 13th-century theorist Johannes de Grocheo believed that the motet was "not to be celebrated in the presence of common people, because they do not notice its subtlety, nor are they delighted in hearing it, but in the presence of the educated and of those who are seeking out subtleties in the arts".

== Etymology ==
In the early 20th century, it was generally believed motet came from the Latin movere (to move), though a derivation from the French mot ("word", or "phrase") had also been suggested. The Medieval Latin for "motet" is motectum, and the Italian mottetto was also used. If the word is from Latin, the name describes the movement of the different voices against one another. Today, however, the French etymology is favoured by reference books, as the word "motet" in 13th-century French had the sense of "little word". The troped clausulas that were the forerunner of the motet were originally called motelli (from the French mot, "word"), soon replaced by the term moteti.

== Medieval examples ==
The earliest motets arose in the 13th century from the organum tradition exemplified in the Notre-Dame school of Léonin and Pérotin. The motet probably arose from clausula sections in a longer sequence of organum. Clausulae represent brief sections of longer polyphonic settings of chant with a note-against-note texture. In some cases, these sections were composed independently and "substituted" for existing setting. These clausulae could then be "troped," or given new text in the upper part(s), creating motets. From these first motets arose a medieval tradition of secular motets. These were two- to four-part compositions in which different texts, sometimes in different vernacular languages, were sung simultaneously over a (usually Latin-texted) cantus firmus usually adapted from a melismatic passage of Gregorian chant on a single word or phrase. It is also increasingly argued that the term "motet" could in fact include certain brief single-voice songs.

The texts of upper voices include subjects as diverse as courtly love odes, pastoral encounters with shepherdesses, political attacks, and many Christian devotions, especially to the Virgin Mary. In many cases, the texts of the upper voices are related to the themes of the chant passage they elaborate on, even in cases where the upper voices are secular in content. Most medieval motets are anonymous compositions and significantly re-use music and text. They are transmitted in a number of contexts, and were most popular in northern France. The largest surviving collection is in the Montpellier Codex.

Increasingly in the 14th and 15th centuries, motets made use of repetitive patterns often termed panisorhythmic; that is, they employed repeated rhythmic patterns in all voices—not only the cantus firmus—which did not necessarily coincide with repeating melodic patterns. Philippe de Vitry was one of the earliest composers to use this technique, and his work evidently had an influence on that of Guillaume de Machaut, one of the most famous named composers of late medieval motets.

=== Medieval composers ===
Other medieval motet composers include:

- Adam de la Halle (1237?–1288? or after 1306)
- Johannes Ciconia (c. 1370–1412)
- Guillaume Du Fay (1397-1474)
- John Dunstaple (c. 1390–1453)
- Franco of Cologne (fl. mid-13th century)
- Jacopo da Bologna (fl. 1340–1385)
- Marchetto da Padova (fl. 1305–1319)
- Petrus de Cruce (fl. second half of the 13th century)
- W. de Wycombe (fl. 1270s)

== Renaissance examples ==
The compositional character of the motet changed entirely during the transition from medieval to Renaissance music, as most composers abandoned the use of a repeated figure as a cantus firmus. Guillaume Dufay was a transitional figure in this regard, writing one of the last important motets in the medieval, isorhythmic style, Nuper rosarum flores, in 1436. During the second half of the fifteenth century Motets stretched the cantus firmus to greater lengths compared to the surrounding multi-voice counterpoint, adopting a technique of contemporary 'tenor masses'. This obscured the cantus firmus rhythm more than in medieval isorhythmic motets. Cascading, passing chords created by the interplay of voices and the absence of an obvious beat distinguish medieval and renaissance motet styles.

Motet frequently used the texts of antiphons and the Renaissance period marked the flowering of the form. The Renaissance motet is polyphonic, sometimes with an imitative counterpoint, for a chorus singing a Latin and usually sacred text. It is not connected to a specific liturgy, making it suitable for any service.

Motets were sacred madrigals and the language of the text was decisive: Latin for a motet and the vernacular for a madrigal. The relationship between the forms is clearest in composers of sacred music, such as Giovanni Pierluigi da Palestrina, whose "motets" setting texts from the Canticum Canticorum are among the most lush and madrigal-like, while his madrigals using Petrarch's poems could be performed in a church. Religious compositions in vernacular languages were often called madrigali spirituali, "spiritual madrigals". These Renaissance motets developed in episodic format with separate phrases of the text given independent melodic treatment and contrapuntal development.

Secular motets, known as "ceremonial motets", typically set a Latin text to praise a monarch, music or commemorate a triumph. The theme of courtly love, often found in the medieval secular motet, was banished from the Renaissance motet. Ceremonial motets are characterised by clear articulation of formal structure and by clear diction, because the texts would be novel for the audience. Adrian Willaert, Ludwig Senfl, and Cipriano de Rore are prominent composers of ceremonial motets from the first half of the 16th century.

=== Renaissance composers ===
The motet was one of the preeminent forms of Renaissance music. Important composers of Renaissance motets include:

- Alexander Agricola
- Gilles Binchois
- Antoine Boësset
- Antoine Brumel
- Antoine Busnois
- William Byrd
- Johannes Vodnianus Campanus
- Pierre Certon
- Jacobus Clemens non Papa
- Loyset Compère
- Thomas Crecquillon
- Josquin des Prez
- John Dunstaple
- François-Eustache Du Caurroy
- Antoine de Févin
- Carlo Gesualdo
- Nicolas Gombert
- Francisco Guerrero
- Heinrich Isaac
- Claude Le Jeune
- Pierre de La Rue
- Orlando di Lasso
- Jean Maillard
- Cristóbal de Morales
- Étienne Moulinié
- Jean Mouton
- Jacob Obrecht
- Johannes Ockeghem
- Andreas Pevernage
- Lucrezia Orsina Vizzana
- Martin Peerson
- Giovanni Pierluigi da Palestrina
- Thomas Tallis
- John Taverner
- Robert Carver
- Tomás Luis de Victoria
- Manuel Cardoso

In the latter part of the 16th century, Giovanni Gabrieli and other composers developed a new style, the polychoral motet, in which two or more choirs of singers (or instruments) alternated. This style of motet was sometimes called the Venetian motet to distinguish it from the Netherlands or Flemish motet written elsewhere. "If Ye Love Me" by Thomas Tallis serves the demand of the Church of England for English texts, and a focus on understanding the words, beginning in homophony.

== Baroque examples ==
In Baroque music, especially in France where the motet was very important, there were two distinct, and very different types of motet: petits motets, sacred choral or chamber compositions whose only accompaniment was a basso continuo; and grands motets, which included massed choirs and instruments up to and including a full orchestra. Jean-Baptiste Lully, Michel Richard de Lalande, Marc-Antoine Charpentier were important composers of this sort of motet. Their motets often included parts for soloists as well as choirs; they were longer, including multiple movements in which different soloist, choral, or instrumental forces were employed. Lully's motets also continued the Renaissance tradition of semi-secular Latin motets in works such as Plaude Laetare Gallia, written to celebrate the baptism of King Louis XIV's son; its text by Pierre Perrin begins:

Plaude laetare Gallia
Rore caelesti rigantur lilia,
Sacro Delphinus fonte lavatur
Et christianus Christo dicatur.

("Rejoice and sing, France: the lily is bathed with heavenly dew. The Dauphin is bathed in the sacred font, and the Christian is dedicated to Christ.")

In France, Pierre Robert (24 grands motets), Henry Dumont (grands & petits motets), Marc-Antoine Charpentier (206 different types of motets), Michel-Richard de La Lande (70 grands motets), Henry Desmarest (20 grands motets), François Couperin (motets lost), Nicolas Bernier, André Campra, Charles-Hubert Gervais (42 grands motets), Louis-Nicolas Clérambault, François Giroust (70 grands motets) were also important composers. In Germany, too, pieces called motets were written in the new musical languages of the Baroque. Heinrich Schütz wrote many motets in series of publications, for example three books of Symphoniae sacrae, some in Latin and some in German. Hans Leo Hassler composed motets such as Dixit Maria, on which he also based a mass composition.

=== J. S. Bach's compositions ===
Six motets attributed to Johann Sebastian Bach and catalogued BWV 225–230 are relatively long pieces combining German hymns with biblical texts, several of them composed for funerals. They are mostly written in a cappella style, basso continuo, with instruments playing colla parte. The first five, for double chorus, are almost certainly composed by Bach and are written in a cappella style, though strings and oboes appear to have accompanied colla parte. Lobet dem Herrn is for SATB with basso continuo.

- BWV 225 Singet dem Herrn ein neues Lied (1726)
- BWV 226 Der Geist hilft unser Schwachheit auf (1729)
- BWV 227 Jesu, meine Freude
- BWV 228 Fürchte dich nicht
- BWV 229 Komm, Jesu, komm (1730?)
- BWV 230 Lobet den Herrn, alle Heiden (?)

The funeral cantata O Jesu Christ, meins Lebens Licht, BWV 118 (1736–37?) is regarded as a motet, though it has independent instrumental parts. The motet Sei Lob und Preis mit Ehren, BWV 231 is an arrangement of a movement from Bach's Cantata 28, and the authenticity of the arrangement is not certain. For a few more motets, such as Ich lasse dich nicht, BWV Anh 159, Bach's authorship is debated.

== Later 18th century - present ==
Later 18th-century composers wrote few motets. Johann Christoph Friedrich Bach composed an extended chorale motet Wachet auf, ruft uns die Stimme, combining Baroque techniques with the galant style. Mozart's Ave verum corpus (K. 618) is this genre. Rameau, Mondonville and Giroust also wrote grands motets.

In the 19th century, some German composers continued to write motets. Felix Mendelssohn composed Jauchzet dem Herrn, alle Welt, Denn er hat seinen Engeln befohlen and Mitten wir im Leben sind. Johannes Brahms composed three motets on biblical verses, Fest- und Gedenksprüche. Josef Rheinberger composed Abendlied. Anton Bruckner composed about 40 motets, mainly in Latin, including Locus iste. French composers of motets include Camille Saint-Saëns and César Franck. In English similar compositions are called anthems. Some later English composers, such as Charles Villiers Stanford, wrote motets in Latin. Most of these compositions are a cappella and some, such as Edward Elgar's three motets Op. 2, are accompanied by organ.

In the 20th century, composers of motets have often consciously imitated earlier styles. In 1920, Ralph Vaughan Williams composed O clap your hands, a setting of verses from Psalm 47 for a four-part choir, organ, brass, and percussion, called a motet. Carl Nielsen set in Tre Motetter three verses from different psalms as motets, first performed in 1930. Francis Poulenc set several Latin texts as motets, first Quatre motets pour un temps de pénitence (1938). Maurice Duruflé composed Quatre Motets sur des thèmes grégoriens in 1960, and Notre Père in 1977. Other examples include works by Richard Strauss, Charles Villiers Stanford, Edmund Rubbra, Lennox Berkeley, Morten Lauridsen, Edward Elgar, Hugo Distler, F. Melius Christiansen, Ernst Krenek, Michael Finnissy, Karl Jenkins and Igor Stravinsky.

Arvo Pärt has composed motets, including Da pacem Domine in 2006, as have Dave Soldier (Motet: Harmonies of the World, with rules from Johannes Kepler), Sven-David Sandström, Enjott Schneider, Ludger Stühlmeyer and Pierre Pincemaille.
