= Discography of motets by Johann Sebastian Bach =

Recordings of vocal compositions by German composer

This article includes a list of commercial recordings of the motets of Johann Sebastian Bach. Bach motets have often been recorded as a set (typically comprising the six motets catalogued as BWV 225-230). However, other motets are attributed to Bach and there is some doubt about the authorship of Lobet den Herrn, alle Heiden, BWV 230, one of the BWV "six".

A single CD has the capacity to contain the set of six motets plus some other works. For example, Maasaki Suzuki's 2009 recording with the Bach Collegium Japan on BIS includes O Jesu Christ, meins Lebens Licht, BWV 118 (which at one time was categorised as a cantata) and Ich lasse dich nicht, BWV Anh. 159 (the authorship of which has been disputed). The motets chosen for a particular recording project can reflect the way the balance of opinion changes regarding the status of particular work: given Bach's status as one of the great composers, a firm attribution to him is likely to result in more interest in recording the piece in question. For example, BWV Anh. 159 was not included by John Eliot Gardiner and the Monteverdi Choir in their first set recorded in 1980. However, they included it in their 2011 recording, by which time scholarly opinion had re-assessed the work.

Recordings have also been made of the less securely attributed and even spurious motets. For example, Wolfgang Helbich recorded The Apocryphal Bach Motets, sung by the Alsfelder Vokalensemble, in 1993 (released in 1994, re-issued 2014).

== Types of choir ==
At least some of the motets would have been first performed by singers from Leipzig's Thomanerchor, which comprises boys and young men. The Thomanchor has maintained a tradition of performing the motets and has recorded them (initially under Günther Ramin in the 1950s), as have other choirs with boys' voices such as the Choir of New College, Oxford.

=== Size of choir ===
Choirs with one voice per part (OVPP) are used in some historically informed performances of Bach. However, OVPP recordings of the motets are in the minority. Exceptions include the Hilliard Ensemble's second set, and Konrad Junghänel with the group Cantus Cölln. Philippe Herreweghe's two sets use OVPP for some motets, for example Jesus meine Freude, and not others. Michael Maul, arguably the leading expert on the Thomanerchor, has presented evidence Bach used a group of eight singers chosen from the full choir for certain services such as funerals.

== Instrumental accompaniment ==
Music directors need to make choices about the instrumental accompaniment, if any, to be used. There are three possible approaches:

- a cappella, that is, without an accompaniment
- instruments doubling the vocal lines, something which is described as playing colla parte
- Basso continuo, or just an organ accompaniment, to provide some instrumental support for the singers

Surviving sources do not make it clear what Bach's approach was to the accompaniment of most of these pieces. In the case of Der Geist hilft unser Schwachheit auf, BWV 226 orchestral parts are extant, indicating that choir I was doubled by strings and choir II by reeds (two oboes, taille and bassoon). There is also a basso continuo provided (separate violone and organ parts) which underlies both choirs. An accompaniment is also specified for Lobet den Herrn.

La Petite Bande and Bach Collegium Japan, for example, use the orchestration of Der Geist hilft unser Schwachheit auf for the other pieces for double choir. However, a capella performance is long-established tradition, which is also reflected in recordings. The Hilliard Ensemble's OVPP version is mainly a capella. They omit the instrumental parts of Der Geist hilft unser Schwachheit auf, but sing Lobet den Herrn to organ accompaniment.

The recordings with continuo accompaniment include The Sixteen's version (the instruments are cello, violone, theorbo, organ) and the second recording by the Monteverdi Choir (cello, double bass, bassoon and organ).

== History ==
The first of the motets to be recorded was Jesu meine Freude in 1927. This version was sung in English.

== Awards ==
In 2010, Suzuki and his ensemble were given a French award (Diapason d'Or de l'Année) and a German award (Preis der deutschen Schallplattenkritik) for their recording of Bach motets on BIS.

John Eliot Gardiner, who has won more Gramophone Awards than any other living artist, received one for his second recording of the motets with the Monteverdi Choir on SDG. It was one of the 2013 awards, the category being "Baroque Vocal".

Grete Pedersen with the Norwegian choir Det Norske Solistkor won a Diapason d'Or in 2018 for their recording of the motets on BIS.

Raphaël Pichon with Pygmalion won an Opus Klassik award in 2021 for their recording of the motets on Harmonia Mundi.

== Discography ==
Recorded sets of Bach's motets usually include at least the motets BWV 225-229. For sets of six, either BWV 230 or BWV Anh. 159 is added. Motets have also been recorded individually, for instance Charles Kennedy Scott and the Bach Cantata Club recorded BWV 227, sung in English, in 1927, which was the first recording of any motet by Bach.

=== Sets ===
The intention has been to feature versions which are still available. The year given is that of recording. In the case of pre-1980s recordings, the date of reissue on CD can be significantly later than the original recording.

Recordings of Bach Motets
| Title | Conductor / Choir / Orchestra | Soloists | Label | Year | Additional info |
|---|---|---|---|---|---|
| 6 Motetten | Günther Ramin Thomanerchor | | Archiv (reissue) | 1950s | |
| Bach: Motets | Philippe Herreweghe | | Harmonia Mundi France | 1985 | first Herreweghe recording |
| The Six Motets | Harry Christophers The Sixteen | | Hyperion | 1989 | reissued 2014: continuo |
| Motetten BWV 255-229 | Frieder Bernius Kammerchor Stuttgart Barockorchester Stuttgart | A. Egeler (s), I. Fischer (s), M. v.d. Zeyst (a), M. Brutscher (t), T. Herberich (b) | Sony | 1990 | |
| | Sigiswald Kuijken La Petite Bande | OVPP | Accent | 1992 | first Kuijken recording; instrumental doubling |
| | Konrad Junghänel Cantus Cölln | OVPP | Deutsche Harmonia Mundi | 1995 | |
| J.S. Bach: Motets | The Scholars Baroque Ensemble | | Naxos | 1996 | |
| Bach Motetten | Hilliard Ensemble | OVPP | ECM | 2003 | second Hilliard recording |
| Bach Motets | Edward Higginbottom Choir of New College, Oxford | | Novum | 2008 | organ accompaniment |
| Bach Motets | Masaaki Suzuki Bach Collegium Japan | | BIS | 2009 | |
| Motetten | Philippe Herreweghe Collegium Vocale Gent | | Phi | 2010 | second Herreweghe recording; instrumental doubling |
| Bach Motets | John Eliot Gardiner Monteverdi Choir | | SDG | 2011 | second Gardiner recording; continuo; live performance |
| Bach - The Motets | Grete Pedersen Norwegian Soloists' Choir Ensemble Allegria | | BIS | 2017 | |
| Bach Motets | Raphaël Pichon Pygmalion | | Harmonia Mundi | 2020 | |

=== Individual motets ===
Sei Lob und Preis mit Ehren, BWV 28/2a (formerly BWV 231)
O Jesu Christ, meins Lebens Licht, BWV 118
Jesu, meine Freude, BWV 227
Tilge, Höchster, meine Sünden, BWV 1083
Der Gerechte kömmt um, BWV 1149
Ich lasse dich nicht, BWV Anh. 159
Jauchzet dem Herrn, alle Welt, BWV Anh. 160
Unser Wandel ist im Himmel, BWV Anh. 165

== Sources ==
- Elste, Martin (2000). "Die Motetten BWV 225–230 und 118." [The motets BWV 225–230 and 118]. Meilensteine der Bach-Interpretation 1750–2000 (in German). J. B. Metzler. pp. 176–179. doi:10.1007/978-3-476-03792-3_16. ISBN 978-3-476-01714-7.
