= Ich lasse dich nicht, BWV 1164 =

Ich lasse dich nicht, du segnest mich denn
- Motet by Johann Sebastian Bach (also attr. Johann Christoph Bach)
- English: I will not let you go unless you bless me
- Key: F minor
- Catalogue: BWV 1164 (BWV Anh. 159)
- Style: A cappella
- Related: (to 2nd mvt.:) BWV 421
- Text: Genesis 32:26; 3 stanzas from "Warum betrübst du dich, mein Herz"
- Language: German
- Based on: Zahn No. 1689a
- Composed: 1713 or earlier (1st mvt.) c. 1735 or earlier (2nd mvt.)
- Published: 1802: Leipzig
- Publisher: Breitkopf & Härtel
- Movements: 2 (2nd added later?)
- Scoring: double SATB choir

Ich lasse dich nicht, du segnest mich denn (I will not let you go unless you bless me), BWV 1164 (renumbered from BWV Anh. 159), is a motet for SATB double choir which was attributed to Johann Sebastian Bach when it was first published in 1802. Around 1823 the motet was published as a composition by Johann Christoph Bach, Johann Sebastian's father's cousin, after which its attribution became a matter of discussion among scholars. The motet consists of two movements: the oldest extant manuscript of its first movement was partly written by Johann Sebastian, in 1712, or early 1713 at the latest. Its second movement is without doubt a chorale harmonisation by Johann Sebastian composed before c. 1735, when a version of this setting was copied in the Dietel manuscript, but it is uncertain when, and by whom, it was added to the first movement.

Notwithstanding an 18th-century catalogue entry apparently describing the motet as a work for four voices with basso continuo, it is transmitted as an a cappella composition for eight voices without any form of instrumental accompaniment. The text of its first movement consists of a dictum, Genesis 32:27 (which is Genesis 32:26 in most English Bibles), and the third stanza of the Lutheran hymn "Warum betrübst du dich, mein Herz". Such a mixture of scripture and chorale texts was common for motets of the generation before Johann Sebastian, as also its eight-part setting. The hymn tune of the chorale, Zahn No. 1689a, appears as a cantus firmus sung by the soprano. Over-all the complexity and style of this movement's setting appears closer to similar works by a young Johann Sebastian than to somewhat less comparable works by a mature Johann Christoph. The closing chorale, a four-part setting of the "Warum betrübst du dich, mein Herz" hymn tune, has the two last stanzas of that hymn as text. Leipzig performances of Bach's motets usually closed on the last stanzas of a hymn, so it can not be excluded that the chorale was added to the motet by Bach, some time after his appointment as Thomaskantor in that city in 1723.

The lingering attribution issue complicated the motet's reception history. In Leipzig, the motet was performed as Johann Sebastian's from the 18th to well into the 19th century. In the second half of the 18th century, Johann Sebastian's son Carl Philipp Emanuel, apparently not assigning the composition to any specific member of the Bach family, joined the early manuscript of its first movement to the Altbachisches Archiv (old-Bachian archive, ABA), a collection of mostly 17th-century compositions by his ancestors. Both the 19th-century Bach-Gesellschaft Ausgabe (BGA) and the 1954–2007 New Bach Edition (NBE) published the motet, while expressing reserves about its authenticity. Containing several motets by Johann Christoph, Max Schneider's 1935 edition of the ABA pieces did not include Ich lasse dich nicht. Complete recordings of Johann Sebastian's motets are issued with or without BWV Anh. 159.

== History and context ==
Bach wrote his motets in the tradition of the Evangelienmotetten (motets on gospel texts) of the 17th century by composers such as Melchior Franck, Melchior Vulpius and Heinrich Schütz. When he composed these works, music without an independent orchestra on texts limited to biblical words and a chorale without contemporary poetry, the genre was already out of fashion, but there was evidently a demand for such works at funerals, a ceremony for which at least some of Bach's motets were written.

There is scholarly debate about the exact number of motets attributable to Bach, and, as in some cases the circumstances of the first performance are not known, nor their function.

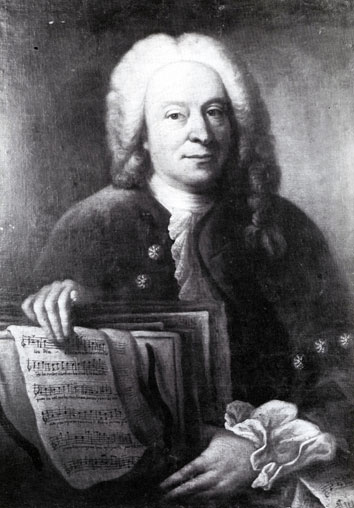
Johann Christoph Bach

Ich lasse dich nicht, then known as only the first movement, was attributed in the 19th century to both Johann Sebastian Bach and Johann Christoph Bach, his father's cousin. In the Bach-Ausgabe, the editor Franz Wüllner described the piece as "one of the most beautiful works of German church music" but not "authentic", therefore giving Johann Christoph Bach as the composer. When Wolfgang Schmieder created the Bach-Werke-Verzeichnis in 1950, he followed Wüllner, placing the motet in the appendix and assigning "presumably by Johann Christoph Bach". When Konrad Ameln edited Bach's motets for the Neue Bach-Ausgabe, he consequently omitted it, but it was printed in the appendix. Other authorities had doubted this attribution, for example Philipp Spitta, who in the first edition of his Bach biography mentioned Johann Christoph Bach as the composer, but in the second added that "the source evidence didn't permit a definite attribution".

Ich lasse dich nicht in two movements was found, written partly in Bach's hand, in the Altbachisches Archiv, a collection of music of the Bach family which the Bach scholar Christoph Wolff rediscovered in Kyiv in 1999. Bach scholars now assume that J. S. Bach composed the first movement, possibly during his Weimar period around 1712. The chorale is a transcription of one of his organ pieces and was possibly added in the 19th century. John Eliot Gardiner, who recorded Bach motets including this one in 2011, comments on the authorship:

Was Bach copying or composing here? We cannot be totally sure, but from the evidence of the way the score is presented it suggests this was indeed composed by Bach, in which case it is the earliest surviving motet of his, dating from c. 1712/13, or possibly earlier, when he was employed at the Ducal court in Weimar. In terms of style it gives the impression of occupying a mid way point between that of Johann Christoph Bach and, say, Fürchte dich nicht. Indeed it feels almost like a tribute from Bach to his elder cousin whom he dubbed 'the profound composer'.

The closing chorale was not part of the score but appeared first in the first print of the motet in 1802 by Johann Gottfried Schicht, also a Thomaskantor. He found the setting in Bach's chorales collected by Carl Philipp Emanuel Bach and Johann Philipp Kirnberger in 1787, transposed it from A minor to F minor and adjusted the time to the motet.

== Text, scoring and structure ==
The text for the first movement of the motet is a verse taken from the Book of Genesis and the account of Jacob's return to Canaan, just before he is due to meet his brother Esau from whose anger he had fled many years before, after tricking his father Isaac into blessing him with the blessing belonging to the firstborn. At night Jacob is approached by a mysterious figure who engages him in a wrestling match in which Jacob prevails, although an injury received during the fight results in a lifelong limp. Jacob insists on being blessed by the man, thought to be a theophany, before he lets go of him (Genesis 32:26). The motet for double choir is followed by the third stanza of the hymn "Warum betrübst du dich, mein Herz" by Erasmus Alberus.

Bach structured the movement in F minor in two sections and scored it for double chorus, SATB – SATB and unspecified instruments playing colla parte. In the second section, the choir is no longer divided, the soprano sings the cantus firmus of the chorale, while the lower voices engage in imitative polyphony.

The added chorale in the same key is the eighth stanza from "Warum betrübst du dich, mein Herz", Dir, Jesu, Gottes Sohn, sei Preis", set for four parts. It is one of Bach's chorale settings, BWV 421, and was possibly added in the 19th century.

=== Recordings ===
Examples of complete recordings of Bach's motets without BWV 1164 include Michel Corboz's, recorded in 1995, and Otto Kargl's, recorded in 2008. On the other hand, the motet is included, with a recording time of 5:08, in Wolfgang Helbich's The Apocryphal Bach Motets, sung by the Alsfelder Vokalensemble, recorded 1993 and released in 1994 (re-issued 2014). Masaaki Suzuki's 2009 Bach Motets recording, with the Bach Collegium Japan, includes the motet without the closing chorale (recording time: 4:01). John Eliot Gardiner, conducting the Monteverdi Choir, recorded Bach's motets without BWV Anh. 159 in 1980, but included it in the 2011 live recording of the set.
