= Singet dem Herrn ein neues Lied, BWV 225 =

Motet by Johann Sebastian Bach

Singet dem Herrn ein neues Lied
- BWV 225
- Motet by J. S. Bach
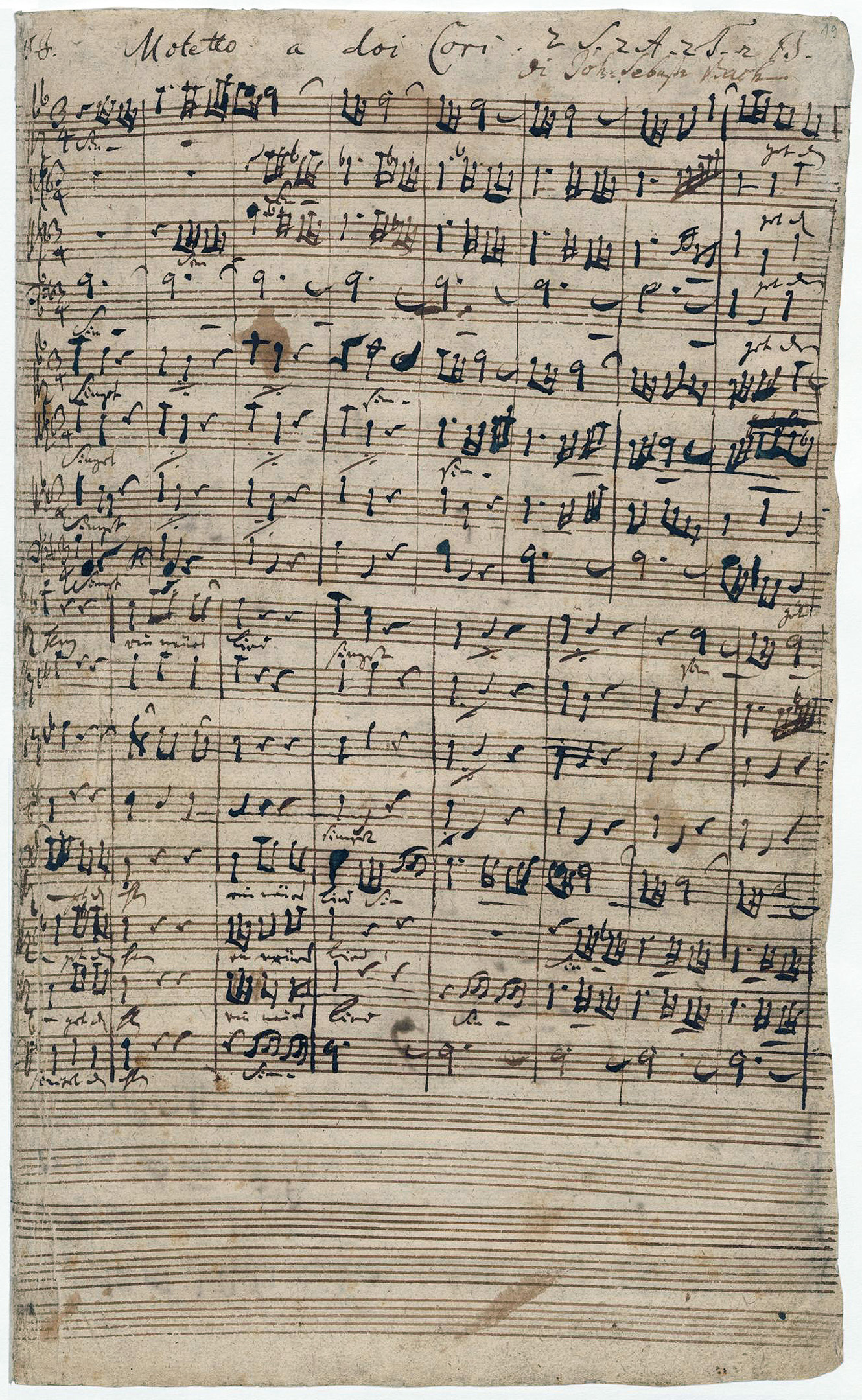
- Manuscript of the beginning
- Bible text: Psalms 149:1–3; Psalms 150:2,6
- Chorale: "Nun lob, mein Seel, den Herren" by Johann Gramann
- Composed: c. 1727
- Published: 1802
- Movements: 3
- Vocal: 2 choirs SATB

Singet dem Herrn ein neues Lied (Sing unto the Lord a new song), BWV 225, is a motet by Johann Sebastian Bach. It was first performed in Leipzig around (probably) 1727. The text of the three-movement motet is in German: after Psalm 149 for its first movement (Psalms 149:1–3), the third stanza of "Nun lob, mein Seel, den Herren" (a 1530 hymn after Psalm 103 by Johann Gramann) for the second movement, and after Psalm 150:2 and 6 for its third movement Psalms 150:2,6.

The motet is described as being for double-choir (in other words eight voices divided into two four-part choirs). It may have been composed to provide choral exercises for Bach's students at the Thomasschule. The motet's biblical text would have been suited to that purpose. The final four-part fugue is titled "Alles was Odem hat" ("All that have voice, praise the Lord!").

Robert Marshall writes that it is "certain" that this motet was one heard by Wolfgang Amadeus Mozart when he visited Leipzig's Thomasschule in 1789. Johann Friedrich Rochlitz, who graduated from the Thomasschule and remained in Leipzig to study theology in 1789, reported ten years later that Johann Friedrich Doles (a student of Bach, who through 1789 was cantor of the Thomasschule and director of the Thomanerchor) "surprised Mozart with a performance of the double-choir motet Singet dem Herrn ein neues Lied by Sebastian Bach... he was told that the school possessed a complete collection of his motets and preserved them as a sort of sacred relic. 'That's the spirit! That's fine!' [Mozart] cried. 'Let's see them!' There was, however, no score... so he had the parts given to him, and ... sat himself down with the parts all around him." Rochlitz also reports that Mozart requested a copy, and "valued it very highly..."

Alles was Odem hat

== Publication ==
The motet was included in the first edition of Bach motets, printed by Breitkopf & Härtel in two volumes in 1802/1803. The editor of both volumes is believed to have been Johann Gottfried Schicht, Thomaskantor from 1810.
