= Leonhard Lechner =

German composer

- Born: c. 1553; South Tyrol
- Died: 9 September 1606 (aged 52–53); Stuttgart
- Other names: Leonard Lechner; Leonhard Lechner Athesinus
- Occupations: Singer; Kapellmeister; Composer

Leonhard Lechner (also Leonard, c. 1553 – 9 September 1606) was a German composer, kapellmeister, tenor and music editor who was taught by Orlando de Lassus. He added Athesinus to his signature, referring to his origin in today's South Tyrol. His last positions were at the court of court of Stuttgart. He is regarded as a "leading German composer of choral music in the later 16th century". While many of his works are lost, a Passion, many expressive songs, and a song cycle are extant. The complete works were published by Bärenreiter in 14 volumes.

== Life ==
Lechner was born in South Tyrol in 1553.

Lechner was originally Catholic but became a Protestant as an adult. As a boy, he sang in the Bayrische Kantorei in Landshut, led by Orlande de Lassus. It was a group of the Bavarian Hofkapelle (court chapel). He was regarded as Lassus' "most distinguished pupil and a great creative force in German music".

Lechner was probably in Italy during the 1570s. From 1575, he taught at a school in Nuremberg. He led an association of upper-class music lovers, Ehrbare musikalische Gesellschaft, which sponsored the publication of religious and secular works. He married a burgher's daughter in Nuremberg and his intent was to live there with his wife. From 1582, he was responsible for music in the town.

In 1584, he was appointed as kapellmeister by Eitel Friedrich IV, Count of Hohenzollern in Hechingen. As the count supported the Counter-Reformation, Lechner left his employment after one year due to their religious differences. He then asked Louis III, Duke of Württemberg, for protection. Lechner became a tenor singer at the court of Stuttgart, later becoming a court composer and then a court kapellmeister, and church musician at the Stiftskirche.

Lechner was ill for years. He died on 9 September 1606 in Stuttgart.

== Works ==
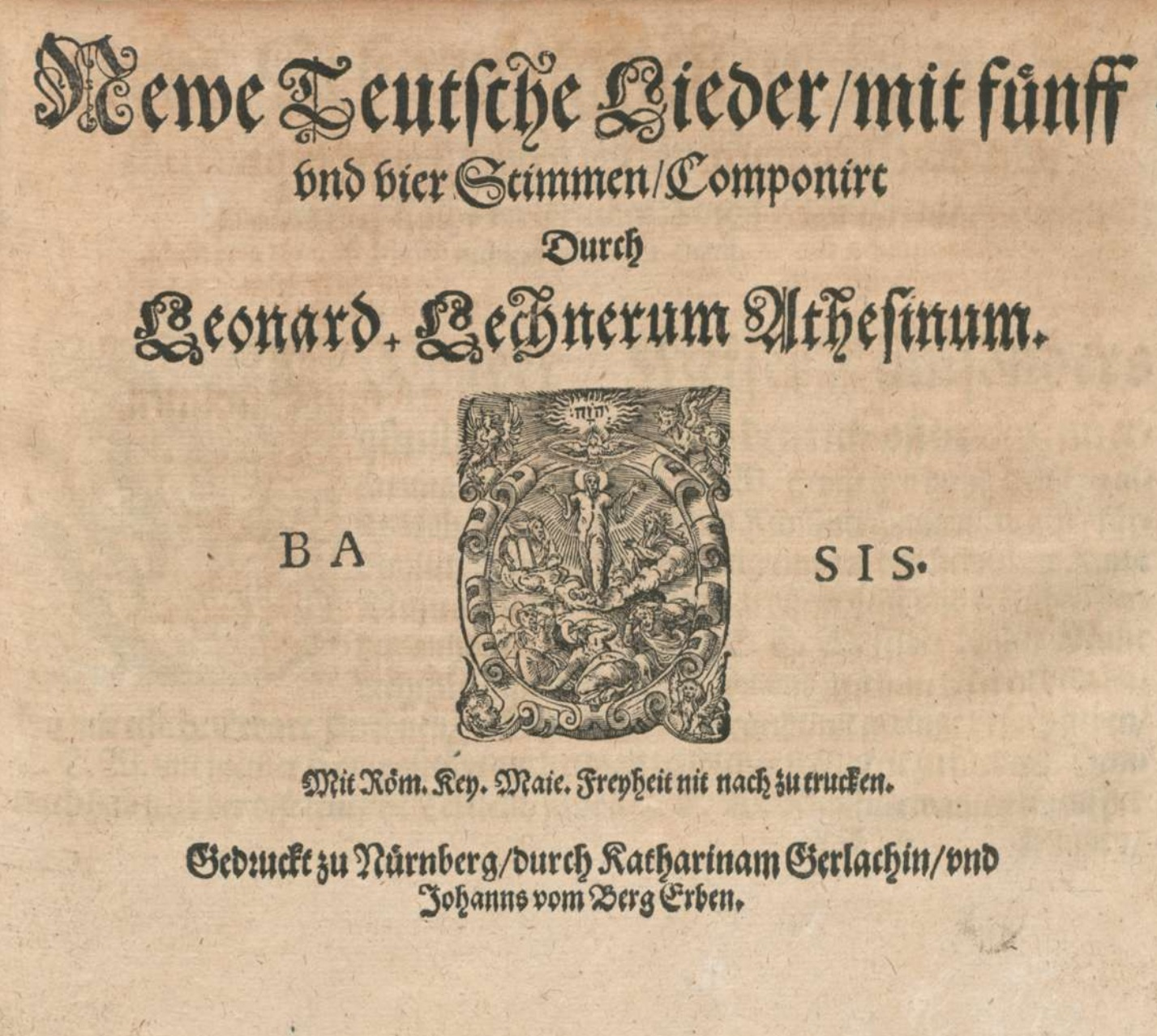
Cover of New German Songs, for Bass, Leonhard Lechner, 1582

Lechner published twelve part-song collections during the 1570s. In 1593, he composed a Passion, Historia der Passion and Leidens unsers einigin Erlösers und Seligmachers Jesu Christi, in Württemberg. The 1593 work has five movements and is for a four-part mixed choir with a German text based on the four Gospels. Barely any of his compositions were printed during his lifetime. Some manuscripts are extant while many of his works are lost. His swan song was Deutsche Sprüche von Leben und Tod (German sentences of life and death).

His works have been published from the 1920s, including the Passion, the Deutsche Sprüche, and his setting of the Song of Songs. A complete edition of his extant works was commissioned by the Heinrich Schütz Society and completed in 14 volumes by Bärenreiter edited by Konrad Ameln.

== Reception ==
The Larousse Encyclopedia Of Music stated, "His music is remarkable for its dramatic power and emotional intensity, qualities particularly evident in the fifteen Deutsche Sprüche von Leben und Tod, which reveal his sure command of techniques ranging from fluent polyphony to chordal writing." John C. Hughes of The Choral Journal wrote, "Upon deeper investigation, one finds Lechner's Passion not only to be a well-constructed work of art ... but also a strong influence upon later contributions to the Passion genre."

He is listed as an ecumenical saint.
