= Fürchte dich nicht, BWV 228 =

Motet by Johann Sebastian Bach

Fürchte dich nicht
- BWV 228
- Funeral motet by J. S. Bach
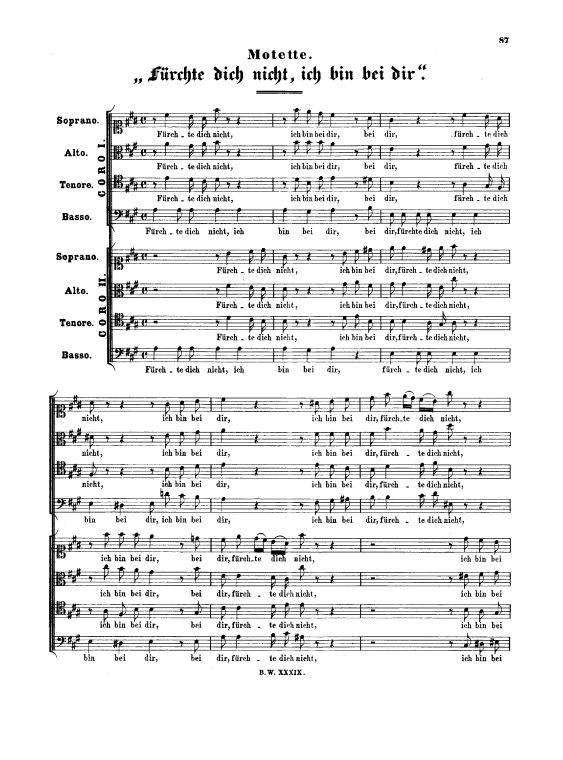
- English: Do not fear
- Bible text: Isaiah 41:10; Isaiah 43:1
- Chorale: Warum sollt ich mich denn grämen by Paul Gerhardt
- Movements: 2
- Vocal: Double choir SATB

Fürchte dich nicht (Do not fear), BWV 228, (Note: "BWV" is Bach-Werke-Verzeichnis, a thematic catalogue of Bach's works.) is a motet for a funeral by Johann Sebastian Bach, set for double chorus. The work in two movements draws its text from the Book of Isaiah and a hymn by Paul Gerhardt. Scholars disagree about the composition time and place which was traditionally believed to be 1726 in Leipzig, while more recent scholarship suggests for stylistic reasons that it was composed earlier during the years Bach lived in Weimar.

== History ==
Bach composed the work for a funeral. His motets were written in the tradition of the Evangelienmotetten (motets on gospel text) of the 17th century by composers such as Melchior Franck, Melchior Vulpius and Heinrich Schütz. When he composed his motets, works without contemporary poetry and without an independent orchestra, the genre was already out of fashion. However, there was evidently a demand for such works at funerals, a ceremony for which at least some of Bach's other motets were written. (Note: There is scholarly debate about the exact number of motets attributable to Bach, and, as in some cases the circumstances of the first performance are not known, their function.)

As the original score has not survived, the work can not be dated with certainty. Traditionally, scholars believed that Bach composed Fürchte dich nicht for a funeral in Leipzig in 1726. Stylistic comparison with other works such as Ich lasse dich nicht, BWV Anh. 159, suggests that Bach wrote it already in his Weimar period (1708–1717).

== Text ==
The text includes no contemporary poetry, as many of his cantatas and passions do, but purely biblical quotations and chorale, as in other motets by Bach and his models. The text is combined from two verses by Isaiah, Isaiah 41:10 and Isaiah 43:1, both beginning with "Fürchte dich nicht". The second verse is combined with two stanzas of Paul Gerhardt's hymn "Warum sollt ich mich denn grämen". Bach would have known a motet on the first verse by Isaiah composed by Johann Christoph Bach.

== Scoring and structure ==
Bach structured the work in two movements and scored it for double chorus, SATB – SATB and unspecified instruments playing colla parte.

In the following table of the movements, the keys and time signatures are taken from the score, using the symbol for common time (4/4).

Movements of Fürchte dich nicht, BWV 228
No.	Title	Text	Type	Vocal	Instruments	Key	Time
1	Fürchte dich nicht, ich bin bei dir	Isaiah 41:10	Chorus	SATB–SATB	unspecified	A major	common time
2	Fürchte dich nicht, denn ich habe dich erlöset; Herr, mein Hirt, Brunn aller Freuden!; Fürchte dich nicht, du bist mein	Isaiah 43:1a; Gerhardt; Isaiah 43:1b	Fugue with chorale	ATB; S; SATB–SATB	unspecified	A major	common time

== Music ==
The first verse by Isaiah is the text for the first movement. In the second movement, the second verse by Isaiah is set as a fugue of the three lower voices, and juxtaposed with the chorale by Gerhardt, sung by the soprano. The lower voices are set in a double fugue, with the subject derived from the beginning of the chorale melody, and the counter subject an inversion. The chromatic theme is reminiscent of the final aria of Bach’s cantata for solo alto Widerstehe doch der Sünde, BWV 54. At one point there is also a strong textual correspondence of biblical quotation and hymn. The conductor John Eliot Gardiner points out that "the biblical 'Ich habe dich bei deinem Namen gerufen' (I have called thee by thy name) leads climactically to the hymn-line 'Ich bin dein, weil du dein Leben ... [gegeben]' (I am thine, for thou hast given thy life). The movement ends with a recapitulation of the music from movement 1 for double choir on the final line of the second psalm verse.

== Discography ==
Fürchte dich nicht has often been recorded with other motets by Bach. These recorded sets of motets are partially listed at Motets by Johann Sebastian Bach, discography.
