= Johann Friedrich Doles =

German composer (1715 - 1797)

Johann Friedrich Doles (23 April 1715 – 8 February 1797) was a German composer and pupil of Johann Sebastian Bach.

Doles was born in Steinbach-Hallenberg in Thuringia. In 1739 he moved to Leipzig to study theology at the University of Leipzig. He also took lessons from Bach. After working in Freiberg, he returned to Leipzig as Kantor at the Thomasschule in 1756.

== Doles and the tradition of Bach performance ==
Doles wrote a manuscript treatise on singing which may preserve some elements of Bach's own methods. In 1789, the last year he conducted the Thomanerchor, he directed the performance of Bach's motet Singet dem Herrn ein neues Lied that reportedly made a deep impression on Mozart.
