= Martin Behm =

German writer (1557–1622)

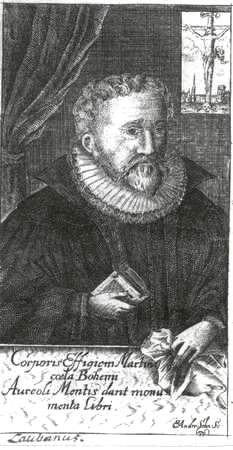
Martin Behm

Martin Behm (1557–1622) was a German hymnwriter.

Born in Lauban (now Lubań in Poland), Behm was deacon and later chief pastor of the town's Holy Trinity Church. He wrote approximately 480 hymns, including "Herr Jesu Christ, meins Lebens Licht" (used by J.S. Bach in his cantata Ach Gott, wie manches Herzeleid, BWV 58) and "O Jesu Christ, mein's Lebens Licht" (used by Bach for his motet of the same name). Carl Schalk wrote that Behm was among the poets at the end of the early Lutheran hymnody period who "produced in a truly popular vein an appreciable number of excellent hymns characterized by objectivity and childlike naivete".
