= Psalm 117 =

117th psalm of the Book of Psalms

- "O praise the LORD, all ye nations: praise him, all ye people."
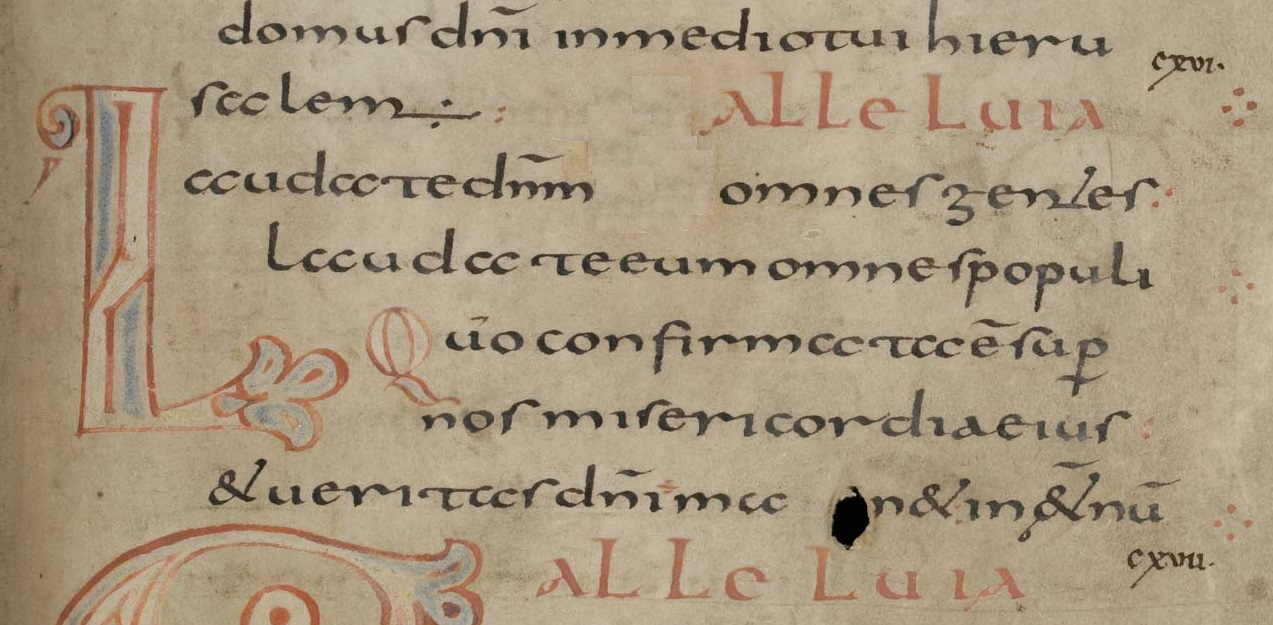
- Psalm 117, from the Wolfcoz Psalter, c. 820 – 830
- Other name: Psalm 116; "Laudate Dominum"
- Language: Hebrew (original)

Psalm 117
- ← Psalm 116 Psalm 118 →
- Book: Book of Psalms
- Hebrew Bible part: Ketuvim
- Order in the Hebrew part: 1
- Category: Sifrei Emet
- Christian Bible part: Old Testament
- Order in the Christian part: 19

Psalm 117 is the 117th psalm of the Book of Psalms, beginning in English in the King James Version: "O praise the LORD, all ye nations: praise him, all ye people." In Latin, it is known as Laudate Dominum. Consisting of only two verses, Psalm 117 is the shortest psalm and also the shortest chapter in the whole Bible. It is joined with Psalm 118 in the manuscripts of the Hebraist scholars Benjamin Kennicott and Giovanni Bernardo De Rossi.

In the slightly different numbering system in the Greek Septuagint and the Latin Vulgate version of the Bible, this psalm is Psalm 116.

== Uses ==
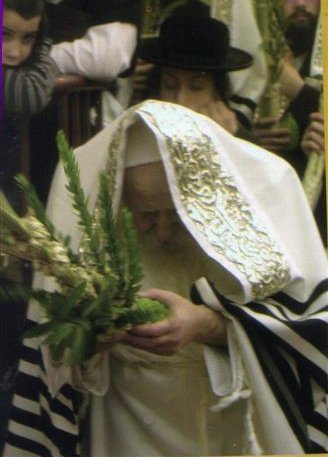
The Tosher Rebbe of Montreal, Quebec, Canada shaking the Four species during Sukkot while praying Hallel.

=== New Testament ===
Verse 1 is quoted in Romans 15:11.

In Psalm 117, the gentiles are invited to join in praise of God. Christians view this as a fulfillment of God's promise of mercy to the gentiles, pointing to God's promise that all nations would be blessed in the seed of Abraham, who they believe is Christ, as described in the Letter to the Galatians:

Now to Abraham and his seed were the promises made. He saith not, And to seeds, as of many; but as of one, And to thy seed, which is Christ.

— Galatians 3:16, King James Version

=== Catholicism ===
In the Catholic Church, the Rule of Saint Benedict assigns this psalm (116 in the Vulgate) to the Office of Vespers on Monday. Saint Benedict of Nursia generally used four psalms in vespers, but because of the shortness of this psalm, he added a fifth when it was used. It is currently used in the Liturgy of the Hours on Saturday of Weeks I and III. The psalm may be sung after Benediction of the Blessed Sacrament, a ritual performed in Catholic and some Anglican churches.

=== Eastern Orthodoxy ===
In the Orthodox Church, this psalm is read as part of the 16th kathisma, to be read ordinarily during Saturday Matins. It is also the last of four psalms read in a sequence every day interspersed with particular hymns (stichera) at Vespers.

=== Coptic Orthodoxy ===
In the Agpeya, the Coptic Church's book of hours, this psalm is prayed in the office of Vespers and the first watch of the Midnight office.

== Musical settings ==
Beginning of Bach's motet

Psalm 117, known by the opening words in Latin as Laudate dominum (translated "O, Praise the Lord" or "Praise ye the Lord"), has been set to music by a number of composers, including William Byrd, Marc-Antoine Charpentier (7 settings: H.177, H.152, H.159, H.182, H.214, H.223, H.224), Michel Richard Delalande, and Johann Sebastian Bach (Lobet den Herrn, alle Heiden, BWV 230). Heinrich Schütz composed a metered paraphrase of the psalm in German, Lobt Gott mit Schall, ihr Heiden all, SWV 215, for the Becker Psalter, published first in 1628. Wolfgang Amadeus Mozart wrote an adaptation of this psalm for solo soprano voice and chorus: the fifth movement of Vesperae solennes de confessore ("Solemn Vespers for a Confessor"), K. 339.

Alan Hovhaness set portions of it, along with Psalm 27, in his 1935 work "The God of Glory Thundereth". The American Jewish musician Robert Strassburg (1915 – 2003) also wrote an adaptation. More recently, it has been set by the Swedish composer Fredrik Sixten. The psalm also forms the introduction of the 90s pop song Happy Nation by Swedish pop group Ace of Base, and a popular arrangement from the Taizé Community.

== Text ==
With just two verses, seventeen words, and 62 characters (29 in verse 1 and 33 in verse 2) in Hebrew, this is the shortest psalm in the Book of Psalms. It is also the shortest chapter in the whole Bible. It is the 595th of the 1,189 chapters of the King James Version of the Bible, making it the middle chapter of this version.

The following table shows the Hebrew text of the Psalm with vowels, alongside the Koine Greek text in the Septuagint, the Latin text in the Vulgate and the English translation from the King James Version. Note that the meaning can slightly differ between these versions, as the Septuagint and the Masoretic Text come from different textual traditions. (Note: A 1917 translation directly from Hebrew to English by the Jewish Publication Society can be found here or here, and an 1844 translation directly from the Septuagint by L. C. L. Brenton can be found here. Both translations are in the public domain.) In the Septuagint, this psalm is numbered Psalm 116.

#	Hebrew	English	Greek	Latin
1	הַֽלְל֣וּ אֶת־יְ֭הֹוָה כׇּל־גּוֹיִ֑ם שַׁ֝בְּח֗וּהוּ כׇּל־הָאֻמִּֽים׃	O praise the LORD, all ye nations: praise him, all ye people.	᾿Αλληλούϊα. - ΑΙΝΕΙΤΕ τὸν Κύριον, πάντα τὰ ἔθνη, ἐπαινέσατε αὐτόν, πάντες οἱ λαοί,	ALLELUIA. Laudate Dominum, omnes gentes; laudate eum, omnes populi.
2	כִּ֥י גָ֘בַ֤ר עָלֵ֨ינוּ ׀ חַסְדּ֗וֹ וֶאֱמֶת־יְהֹוָ֥ה לְעוֹלָ֗ם הַֽלְלוּ־יָֽהּ׃	For his merciful kindness is great toward us: and the truth of the LORD endureth for ever. Praise ye the LORD.	ὅτι ἐκραταιώθη τὸ ἔλεος αὐτοῦ ἐφ᾿ ἡμᾶς, καὶ ἡ ἀλήθεια τοῦ Κυρίου μένει εἰς τὸν αἰῶνα.	Quoniam confirmata est super nos misericordia eius, et veritas Domini manet in aeternum.
