= Warum betrübst du dich, mein Herz, BWV 138 =

Church cantata by Johann Sebastian Bach

Warum betrübst du dich, mein Herz
- BWV 138
- Church cantata by J. S. Bach
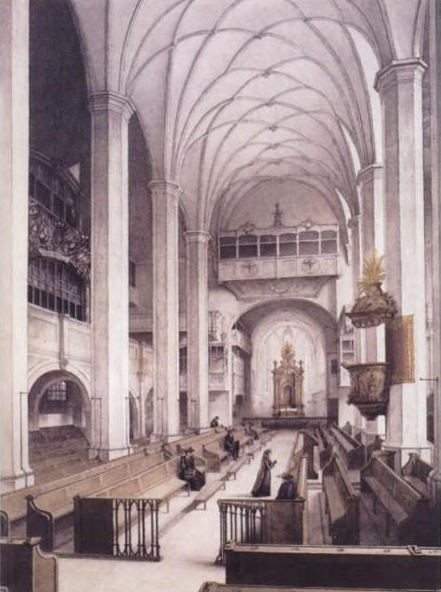
- Thomaskirche in Leipzig, where Bach's cantata Warum betrübst du dich, mein Herz was possibly first performed
- Occasion: 15th Sunday after Trinity
- Bible text: Matthew 6:23–34
- Chorale: Warum betrübst du dich, mein Herz
- Movements: seven
- Vocal: SATB soloists and choir
- Instrumental: 2 oboes d'amore; 2 violins; viola; continuo

Johann Sebastian Bach composed the church cantata Warum betrübst du dich, mein Herz (Why do you trouble yourself, my heart), BWV 138, in Leipzig for the 15th Sunday after Trinity and first performed it on 5 September 1723. The text by an unknown author includes three stanzas from the hymn of the same name. Its text and melody were formerly attributed to Hans Sachs, but were written by an unknown hymn writer. The cantata has seven movements and is scored for SATB soloists and choir, two oboes d'amore, two violins, viola and basso continuo. The cantata has features of a chorale cantata although it was written a year before Bach's annual cycle of chorale cantatas. Bach used an aria as the base of the Gratias of his Missa in G major.

== History and words ==
Bach wrote the cantata in his first year in Leipzig for the 15th Sunday after Trinity. The prescribed readings for the Sunday were from the Epistle to the Galatians, Paul's admonition to "walk in the Spirit" (Galatians 5:25–6:10), and from the Gospel of Matthew, from the Sermon on the Mount the demand not to worry about material needs, but to seek God's kingdom first (Matthew 6:23–34). Melody and words of the chorale, published in Nuremberg in 1561, were once attributed to Hans Sachs, but this seems not likely according to Albert Friedrich Wilhelm Fischer's Kirchenliederlexikon (1878). Its theme is close to the reading from the Sermon on the Mount. Different from later chorale cantatas, the words are not based exclusively on the complete chorale, but only on the first three of its fourteen verses, used in three movements, expanded by additional poetry. The unknown poet contrasted the theme of the chorale, trust in God, with the anxious questioning of single voices, stressed by contrast of the metric poetry of the chorale opposed to the free meter of many interspersed recitatives. A turning point from distress to trust is reached close to the end in the only aria of the cantata.

Bach first performed the cantata on 5 September 1723. Bach used the only aria as a base for the Gratias of his Missa in G major.

== Scoring and structure ==
The cantata in seven movements is scored for soprano, alto, tenor and bass soloists, a four-part choir singing the chorale exclusively, and a Baroque instrumental ensemble of two oboes d'amore, two violins, viola, and basso continuo.

1. Chorale and recitative (alto): Warum betrübst du dich, mein Herz
2. Recitative (bass): Ich bin veracht
3. Chorale and recitative (soprano, alto): Er kann und will dich lassen nicht
4. Recitative (tenor): Ach süßer Trost
5. Aria (bass): Auf Gott steht meine Zuversicht
6. Recitative (alto): Ei nun! So will ich auch recht sanfte ruhn
7. Chorale: Weil du mein Gott und Vater bist

Note: the numbering of the movements follows Alfred Dürr. Other authorities do not consider the bass recitative as a separate movement.

== Music ==
Bach followed the idea of the unusual text in a complex way in the two movements contrasting the chorale with recitative: in both, in lines 1 to 3 the strings open, the oboes enter, oboe I playing the chorale theme, oboe II adding lamenting motifs, then the tenor enters singing the chorale line as an arioso, finally the choir sings the choral theme in a four-part setting; this is followed by the recitative of the questioning single voice, alto in the first movement, soprano in the later one, both accompanied by the strings. After the three lines and recitatives, lines 4 and 5 are sung by the choir in the first movement. In the later one lines 4 and 5 are first composed as an imitative choral movement on the chorale theme of line 4 in a five-part setting, the fifth part played by violin I. Then a final secco recitative leads to a repeat of lines 4 and 5, this time similar to the first movement.

The only aria in dancing 6/8 time is dominated by figuration of violin I. The third verse of the chorale ends the cantata in a simple choral setting embedded in orchestral music on an independent theme.

The cantata's unusual structure has been criticized by his biographers Philipp Spitta and Albert Schweitzer. John Eliot Gardiner, who conducted the Monteverdi Choir and the English Baroque Soloists on their Bach Cantata Pilgrimage in performance and recording at the Liebfrauenkirche, Bremen (de), objects and summarises the cantata:

There is no question that BWV 138 is a highly original, experimental work, one that is simultaneously archaic, especially in the motet-like writing … and modern in Bach's way of grappling with three successive stanzas of a sixteenth-century chorale, in anticipation of the chorale-based cantatas of his second Leipzig cycle. It is a clever device which allows him to pile on the tension between anxiety (the solo recitative interjections) and belief (the choral delivery of the hymn stanzas). The cantata's turning-point occurs midway – a dawning realisation that God will come to the believer’s rescue... with an outspoken declaration of trust in His providential care. The elaborate fantasia in 6/8 for the final chorale is a perfect – and well-planned – counterbalance to the gloom and distress of the opening movements.

== Recordings ==
- Bach Made in Germany Vol. 1 – Cantatas VII, Günther Ramin, Thomanerchor, Gewandhausorchester, soloists of the Thomanerchor, Gert Lutze, Johannes Oettel, Eterna 1953
- J. S. Bach: Cantatas BWV 136 & BWV 138, Diethard Hellmann, choir and orchestra of the Christuskirche, Mainz, Agnes Giebel, Marie-Luise Gilles, Alexander Young, Carl-Heinz Müller, Cantate 1960
- Die Bachkantate Vol. 50, Helmuth Rilling, Gächinger Kantorei, Bach-Collegium Stuttgart, Arleen Augér, Ria Bollen, Aldo Baldin, Philippe Huttenlocher, Hänssler 1978
- J. S. Bach: Mit Fried und Freud, Philippe Herreweghe, Collegium Vocale Gent, Deborah York, Ingeborg Danz, Mark Padmore, Peter Kooy, Harmonia Mundi France 1998
- J. S. Bach: Cantatas Vol. 11, Masaaki Suzuki, Bach Collegium Japan, Midori Suzuki, Kai Wessel, Makoto Sakurada, Peter Kooy, BIS 1998
- J. S. Bach: Complete Cantatas Vol. 9, Ton Koopman, Amsterdam Baroque Orchestra & Choir, Caroline Stam, Bernhard Landauer, Christoph Prégardien, Klaus Mertens, Antoine Marchand 1998
- Bach Cantatas Vol. 8, John Eliot Gardiner, Monteverdi Choir, English Baroque Soloists, Malin Hartelius, William Towers, James Gilchrist, Peter Harvey, recorded in the Liebfrauenkirche Bremen, Soli Deo Gloria 2000

== Sources ==
- Warum betrübst du dich, mein Herz, BWV 138: Scores at the International Music Score Library Project
- Warum betrübst du dich, mein Herz BWV 138; BC A 132 / Sacred cantata (15th Sunday after Trinity) Bach Digital
- Cantata BWV 138 Warum betrübst du dich, mein Herz? history, scoring, sources for text and music, translations to various languages, discography, discussion, Bach Cantatas Website
- BWV 138 Warum betrübst du dich, mein Herz? English translation, University of Vermont
- BWV 138 Warum betrübst du dich, mein Herz? text, scoring, University of Alberta
- Chapter Chapter 18 BWV 138 Warum betrübst du dich mein Herz / My heart, what ails you? Julian Mincham, 2010
