= Paul Steinitz =

English post-war organist

Paul Steinitz OBE (25 August 1909 – 21 April 1988) was an English post-war organist, best known as an interpreter of Johann Sebastian Bach's music. He founded the London Bach Society and Steinitz Bach Players, performing among other significant Bach projects, a complete cycle of Bach's cantatas, mainly in London venues, over a period of 29 years, the first public cycle of the extant church and secular works in the UK.

== Career ==
(Charles) Paul (Joseph) Steinitz was born in Chichester in 1909, the son of an Anglican clergyman. He was educated privately and later studied at the Royal Academy of Music, and with George Oldroyd and Stanley Marchant. He was a skilled organist, obtaining his fellowship diploma (FRCO) in 1930, only six months after taking his associateship diploma (ARCO) from the Royal College of Organists. In the 1930s, he served as director of music at St. Mary's parish church, Ashford, Kent, where he developed his keen interest on Bach while studying for his Doctorate (University of London, 1940). Having founded the London Bach Society in 1946, Steinitz was then appointed director of music and organist at the Priory Church of St. Bartholomew-the-Great in London (1949–1961) and became senior, then principal lecturer at University of London Goldsmiths College (1945–1977), serving on the University of London Senate during his tenure. He was appointed professor at the Royal Academy of Music (1945–1984), then consultant professor from 1984 to 1988.

== London Bach Society ==
In 1946 Steinitz founded the (South) London Bach Society with the aim of performing Bach's works in their original form, free from the romantic exaggerations which had been habitual from the Victorian era and using appropriate editions. From 1950 onwards Bach's works were performed in the German language, a controversial move at the time as the language was still perceived as an enemy tongue. In 1952 Steinitz directed the first performance in Britain of Bach's St Matthew Passion in its complete and original German form using the 1736 score. The presentation was a conscious attempt to 'get back to Bach in its original form' that has since been acknowledged as a key moment in the move towards performing Bach's music according to period style and to scale. The annual performances that followed became a highlight of the musical calendar, were broadcast regularly and drew a Who's Who of solo artistry to the platform. Through these and his other influential Bach projects and performances, Steinitz is widely acknowledged to be a pioneer in the field, a key figure in the British Bach revival of the 20th century.

The word "South" was dropped from the London Bach Society's title in 1952, and later Steinitz embarked on the mammoth task of performing all 208 of Bach's extant cantatas to British audiences. This project was begun in November 1958 and completed in December 1987, just a few months before Steinitz's death. In 1968 he founded the Steinitz Bach Players, a group of professional players who shared Steinitz's ideals of authentic performance. The playing style complemented the singing style of the choir in the cantatas and passions and their performances of the St Matthew Passion – and sometimes the St John Passion – were eagerly awaited annual events, generally given in prominent London churches. Performances given beyond the capital brought the singers and players to leading British Festivals, and there were frequent tours abroad, including United States, Israel, German Democratic Republic (1964 and 1983, including St. Thomas' Church Leipzig both times) and Bulgaria.

Steinitz's music making was not restricted to Bach and other Baroque composers. He was a champion of contemporary, mostly British, composers. Commissions and first performances were established in the 1950s and 1960s and included works by Stravinsky (Canticum Sacrum, guest conducted by Robert Craft, in 1956), Bruno Maderna, Luigi Dallapiccola, Peter Maxwell Davies, John Tavener, Anthony Milner, Stanley Glasser (sung in Zulu), Christopher Brown, Geoffrey Burgon and his own pupil Nicholas Maw.

In conjunction with Joan Brocklebank, Steinitz also started another choral and chamber orchestral society in 1955, the Dorset Bach Cantata Club. At the time of its foundation, Steinitz was already contemplating the presentation of a more considered cycle of Bach's cantatas with his London Bach Society, and directing DBCC weekends not only enabled him to create more time to study and perform the cantatas but also to extend knowledge of them to a wider circle. The Dorset Bach Cantata Club remains the only one of its type in the country and in 2016 celebrated its 60th anniversary. In 2009, Steinitz' centenary year, the group dedicated its October meeting to its founder and first conductor.

== Scholarship, honours and personal life ==
Steinitz's scholarship and profound understanding of his subject did not prevent him from trusting his players and singers on matters of technique and interpretation. This mutual trust led to some memorable readings and glowing praise in the national press. "All of Bach's music is dance music except for the recitatives", he would tell the musicians he worked with.

His publications include the chapter on German church music in the 18th century in the New Oxford History of Music, harmony textbooks for music students as well as books entitled Bach's Passions, Bach for Choirs, and Performing Bach's Vocal Music. There are also numerous letters and articles published by The Musical Times from the 1950s to 1980s and in various American Journals including that of the American Choral Directors Association (ACDA).

Steinitz was a fellow of the Royal Academy of Music and Royal College of Organists. He was appointed an Officer of the Order of the British Empire (OBE) in 1985, the Bach tercentenary year. However, he would wish Bach to have the last honour: a portrait of the composer would often be leaning against the conductor's rostrum, and then held high to rapturous applause at the end of the concert.

Steinitz died on 21 April 1988 at home in his beloved 18th-century cottage in Old Oxted village, Surrey, after a short illness. He was a devout Quaker who held a passionate belief that music could contribute to peace by bridging political divides.

A public memorial to him was placed in the Cloister of St Bartholomew-the-Great, West Smithfield, in the City of London. It was provided by public subscription, created by Richard Kindersley and unveiled in 1991 by the serving Lord Mayor of London Sir Alexander Grahame GBE. The ceremony was followed by an all-Bach concert that reflected the musical forces Steinitz was advocating, now being handed on to the next generation to take forward. The programme of Bach's seasonal cantatas, the famous Chaconne and Third Suite was given to a distinguished audience of public figures, musicians and supporters. It was a fitting memorial and provided encouragement for the future, the seamless continuity Steinitz wanted so much to take place after his death.

At the opening of the London Bach Festival that celebrated the LBS 50th anniversary in 1996, the composer John Tavener paid tribute to Steinitz for his contribution to British musical life and to the London Bach Society. He said: "I do not think that Paul was ever truly recognised and I think that England should hang its head in shame ... without him the London Bach Society would not have existed."

Steinitz and his first wife Joan (née Paxton), whom he married in 1933, had two sons, Nicholas and Richard. (Professor Richard Steinitz is the founder of the Huddersfield Contemporary Music Festival). This marriage ended in 1945 and Steinitz married his second wife Margery (née Still) by whom he had a daughter Felicity. This marriage was also dissolved. In 1976 he married his third wife Margaret who has continued his work since Paul Steinitz's death and developed the London Bach Society to incorporate Steinitz Bach Players, founding an annual Bachfest in 1990 and of which she is overall artistic director. In 2001, she became an honorary associate of the Royal Academy of Music (Hon.ARAM) and was awarded the Officer's Cross of the German Order of Merit in 2006. In 2019, Margaret was awarded the Medal of Honour of the British-German Association.

Steinitz' centenary was reflected appropriately at the London Bach Society's Bachfest in 2009 and by other organisations with whom he was closely associated. Care was taken to present a series that was active rather than passive in keeping with Steinitz' own approach to Bach study and performance. A concert in the Royal Academy of Music/Kohn Foundation Bach Cantata series was dedicated to him, a Steinitz Bach String Prize to run for three years was inaugurated at the Royal Welsh College of Music and Drama, a special Bach Cantata concert performed by Steinitz Bach Players and an array of contemporary Bach singers was presented in the Priory Church of St. Bartholomew the Great and a new 18–30 Bach Club founded. In 2010 a development campaign was launched at the London Bach Society's 20th Bachfest entitled "Bach for Life", an ongoing project, the chief aim of which is to secure a central headquarters for the London Bach Society at some point in the future. Having just celebrated its 70th anniversary in November 2016, the LBS works to a strategic plan and programme of work planned up to 2021, the society's 75th anniversary.
