= Konrad Ameln =

German musicologist

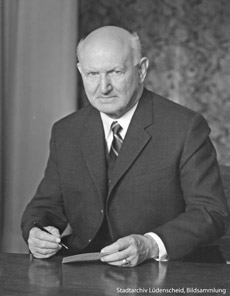
- Konrad Ameln in 1980
- Born: 6 July 1899; Neuss, German Empire
- Died: 1 September 1994 (aged 95); Lüdenscheid, Germany
- Education: University of Göttingen; University of Freiburg
- Occupations: Musicologist; Hymnologist
- Organizations: Lüdenscheider Musikvereinigung; Landeskirchenmusikschule Rheinland; Internationale Arbeitsgemeinschaft für Hymnologie

Konrad Ameln (6 July 1899 – 1 September 1994) was a German hymnologist and musicologist, who wrote standard works about Protestant church music.

== Life ==
=== Childhood, youth and academic years ===
Born in Neuss, Ameln grew up in Kassel and attended the humanistic Wilhelms-Gymnasium there. He took part in the First World War as a volunteer and was captured, then released in 1919. After his return he received his Abitur without an examination and began studying musicology with Friedrich Ludwig at the University of Göttingen in 1920. In 1921 he changed to Wilibald Gurlitt at the University of Freiburg. There he achieved the doctorate in 1924 with a dissertation on Geschichte der Melodien "Innsbruck, ich muss dich lassen" and "Ach Gott, vom Himmel sieh darein".

=== Activities ===
Since his youth Ameln was active in the Wandervogel movement and the Jugendmusikbewegung. He published from 1925 to 1933 in the magazine Die Singgemeinde (The singing community) of the Finkensteiner Bund. After further studies and activity as adult education lecturer and director of various choirs in Rendsburg and Kassel, Ameln worked from 1926 to 1928 as a specialist for music at the Stadtbibliothek Leipzig municipal library, and for the German central office for public libraries in Leipzig. In 1928, he became director of the Singwochen of the Finkensteiner Bund.

From 1930 to 1939 Ameln was, with interruptions, a private lecturer for Protestant church music at the Westfälische Wilhelms-Universität in Münster. From 1931 he taught first at the Pädagogische Akademie in Elbing, later at the Pädagogische Akademie in Dortmund. Since he refused to exclude his communist and social democratic students from the final examinations in 1933, he was briefly imprisoned, as were some of his colleagues. He was then first put into temporary retirement in 1934, and moved with his family to Lüdenscheid. Ameln joined the SS on 1 November 1933 and worked there as SS-Scharführer and training officer of the Race and Settlement Office. In 1934, his songs for male choir "Wir wollen ein starkes einiges Reich sein" and "Das Lied vom neuen Reich" on texts by Hermann Claudius were published. On an application from 15 June 1937, Ameln became a member of the NSDAP (Party number 4.261.371).

At the beginning of the Second World War, Ameln volunteered for the Wehrmacht. He was first assigned to the Landesschützen-Ersatz-Bataillon VI. In April 1940 he was promoted to lieutenant in the 393rd Infantry Division. Ameln was then active for the Wehrmacht defense. In January 1945 he was a captain in the Grenadier Regiment 1001 and fell into American captivity near Enns on the Danube. He was released on May 24, 1946.

In 1946 Ameln tried to regain his former activity as a lecturer at the Westfälische Wilhelms-Universität in Münster. However, the Protestant faculty and the State church rejected this attempt. In the post-war period Ameln was again active as a lecturer, first at the Landesmusikschule in Hannover. From 1949 to 1957 he taught hymnology and history of Protestant church music at the Landeskirchenmusikschule der Evangelischen Kirche im Rheinland. There he edited the Handbuch der deutschen evangelischen Kirchenmusik, which has been published in numerous editions. In 1959 he founded the Internationale Arbeitsgemeinschaft für Hymnologie, which he led until 1967.

Ameln became known as the editor of Bach's motets, and works by George Frideric Handel and Leonhard Lechner, which were published by Bärenreiter-Verlag. On behalf of the Georg-Friedrich-Händel-Gesellschaft he published the first volume of the new Hallische Händel-Ausgabe with Alexander's Feast, HWV 75. For the Messiah of the same edition he provided a new German version.

In 1980 he was awarded the title Professor by the state of North Rhine-Westphalia.

Ameln died in Lüdenscheid at age 95.

=== Lüdenscheider Musikvereinigung ===
In 1935, Ameln founded, together with the physician Wilhelm Boecker, the Lüdenscheider Musikvereinigung (Lüdenscheid music association) in Lüdenscheid. He was its musical director until 1973. They organised annual music festivals where early music could be heard on period instruments, played by professionals such as Ferdinand Conrad and August Wenzinger, but also contemporary music. With the beginning of the Second World War, Ameln's activities were severely restricted. After his return from American captivity in 1946, he resumed work on the music festivals.

== Literature ==
- Helmut Pahl: Lüdenscheider Köpfe des Kulturellen Lebens von A–Z. Lüdenscheid 2003.
- Gerhard Schuhmacher (ed.): Traditionen und Reformen in der Kirchenmusik: Festschrift für Konrad Ameln zum 75. Geburtstag am 6. Juli 1974. Kassel among others: Bärenreiter, 1974; ISBN 3-7618-0501-2.
- Alexander Völker, Ada Kadelbach, Andreas Marti: In memoriam Konrad Ameln. In: Jahrbuch für Liturgik und Hymnologie 34 (1992/93), S. VII–X; ISSN 0075-2681

== Sources ==
- Nachlass Ameln at Sängermuseum Feuchtwangen
- Nachlass Ameln at Archiv der Jugendmusikbewegung
- Nachlass Ameln at Universitätsarchiv Augsburg
- Hymnologische Sammlung Amelns in der Universitätsbibliothek Augsburg
- Privater Nachlass Konrad Ameln at Stadtarchiv Lüdenscheid (previously uncharted)
