= Sei Lob und Preis mit Ehren, BWV 28/2a =

Motet based on a cantata movement by Johann Sebastian Bach

Sei Lob und Preis mit Ehren BWV 28/2a (231)
- Motet by Johann Sebastian Bach
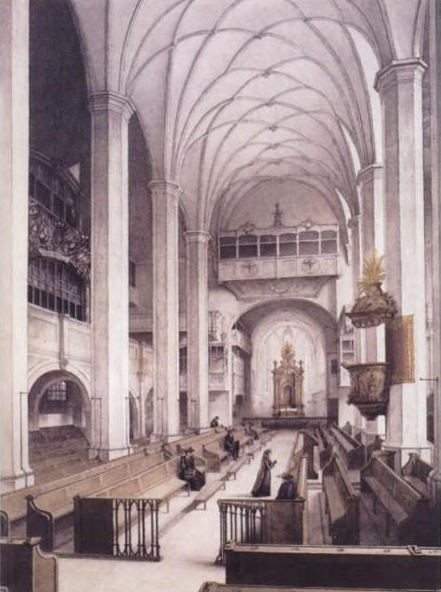
- Thomaskirche, Leipzig 1885
- Performed: 1725?
- Movements: 1
- Vocal: SATB choir and soloists

Sei Lob und Preis mit Ehren (May there be praise and glory and honour), BWV 28/2a and BWV 231, identical to the second movement of BWV Anh. 160, is a motet composed by Johann Sebastian Bach. It was composed some time in 1725.

== Text ==
BWV 28/2a is an arrangement of the second movement of Bach's cantata Gottlob! nun geht das Jahr zu Ende, BWV 28, with a different text, however taken from the same Lutheran hymn, that is Johann Gramann's "Nun lob, mein Seel, den Herren" (1530).

== Music ==
The motet has SATB voice parts. In some printings of this motet, a basso continuo is added to support the bass part, doubling it exactly.

== Recordings ==
- Thomanerchor Leipzig, Baroque Brass of London and Capella Thomana conducted by Georg Christoph Biller (recorded February 1997).
