= O Jesu Christ, meins Lebens Licht, BWV 118 =

Motet by Johann Sebastian Bach

O Jesu Christ, meins Lebens Licht (O Jesus Christ, light of my life), BWV 118, (Note: "BWV" is Bach-Werke-Verzeichnis, a thematic catalogue of Bach's works.) is a sacred motet composed by Johann Sebastian Bach. It is known to have been performed at a funeral, and was possibly a generic work intended for funerals. When the work was first published in the nineteenth century it was called a cantata, perhaps because it has an instrumental accompaniment. While it is not an a cappella work, modern scholarship accepts it is a motet.

== History and text ==
This work was written around 1736 or 1737, and so may have been premiered before the first known performance at the grave-side ceremony for Count Joachim Friedrich von Flemming on October 11, 1740. The Count was Governor of Leipzig and known to Bach who had presented a couple of congratulatory works to him. The fact that the accompaniment exists in two versions suggests that there was a subsequent revival of the work in the 1740s.

The text is a 1610 hymn by Martin Behm.

== Music ==
"O Jesu Christ, meins Lebens Licht" has been characterized as something between a cantata and a motet. This work is a motet version of the chorale Ach Gott, wie manches Herzeleid. The lower voices of the choir sing counterpoint to the chorale melody line in the soprano. The accompaniment includes an ascending string motive.

=== Scoring and structure ===
The piece is scored for four-part choir. It is structured as a chorus, O Jesu Christ, mein's Lebens Licht, comprising chorale strophes separated by repeated instrumental interludes. The number of strophes sung would likely correspond to the length of the procession for which the work was used.

There are two versions of the instrumental scoring:

- The first version is unique among the Bach cantatas in not including strings, and also differs from the instrumentation of the motets, where that is specified. It is for two litui (an instrument which one source contends was a "horn" and "trumpet-like"), cornett, three trombones, and organ;
- The second version is for two litui, strings, organ continuo, and optionally three oboes and bassoon.

The first version is possibly intended for outdoor use where brass would be more effective than strings. (The inclusion of an organ part suggests a performance at least partly indoors, but a portable organ may have been used). The second version is more suitable for indoor acoustics. The available recordings of the piece (see section below) appear to have been performed indoors. A notable outdoor performance was that of John Eliot Gardiner and the Monteverdi Choir, who performed it outside Iona Abbey to mark the 250th anniversary of Bach's death. However, this performance was not included in the Bach Cantata Pilgrimage set of recordings.

== Publication ==
The work was published in 1876 in the first complete edition of Bach's works, the Bach-Gesellschaft Ausgabe. The volume in question consisted of cantatas rather than motets and was edited by Alfred Dörffel. It was subsequently included among the motets in the New Bach Edition in a volume edited by Konrad Ameln.

== Recordings ==
- Greifswalde Bach Tage Choir / Bach-Orchester Berlin. J.S. Bach: Soli Deo Gloria. Baroque Music Club, 1950s–1960s?
- Amor Artis Chorale. Choral Masterpieces of the Baroque. Decca, 1965.
- Monteverdi Choir. "Funeral Cantatas (cantatas BWV 106, BWV 118b & BWV 198)". Archiv, 1989
- Theatre of Early Music. The Voice of Bach. Sony BMG, 2007.
- Amsterdam Baroque Orchestra & Choir, Ton Koopman J.S. Bach: Complete Cantatas, Vol. 21. Antoine Marchand, 2007.
- Bach Collegium Japan. Bach: Motets. BIS, 2009.
