= London Bach Society =

The London Bach Society is a society devoted to performing the music of Johann Sebastian Bach (1685–1750) with small, professional forces, using period instruments in order to obtain an authentic style of interpretation.

== History ==
The London Bach Society was founded in 1946 by Paul Steinitz who, at that time, was organist of St Peter's Church, Dulwich Common. The first recitals took place in June the following year. Steinitz had been working for some years on ideas about performing Baroque music and it was his long-term intention to 'get back to Bach in its original form'. This was at a time when Romantic notions held sway in Baroque performance. Bach's music, especially his vocal music, had fallen into decline and virtual oblivion after his death in 1750 except for the attentions of his second son C. P. E. Bach, and some of his pupils. In England, the Bach revival owed much to the organist Samuel Wesley who disseminated some of the composer's music in the early 19th century. Indeed, the first performance in Britain of a Bach's choral work took place on 3 June 1809 in the Hanover Square Rooms, London - a performance of the motet Jesu, meine Freude sung in Latin and directed by Wesley. In Germany it was not until Felix Mendelssohn performed the St Matthew Passion in 1829 that interest was reawakened. Therefore, for over a century, Bach's vocal music was performed by large choral societies in the romantic style, and using inappropriate editions. It was obvious to Steinitz that such huge choirs could not achieve the clarity required nor balance appropriately with the small orchestras of period instruments the composer would have used. Taking the first steps towards his aims, Steinitz formed first a choir of 50 members that held their inaugural rehearsal on 7 January 1947. This amateur choir was trained to a high standard, and for the next two decades was the backbone of the Society, not only performing the vocal works by Bach but also those of his contemporaries including Handel and Telemann, and early Baroque composers such as Heinrich Schütz (1585–1672).

On 22 March 1952, the Society presented the first performance in the UK of Bach's St. Matthew Passion in its complete and original German form. It has since been suggested that this performance, an honest attempt to take a fresh look at an established masterpiece, marked the beginning of the move towards historically aware performances of the composer's music in the UK. Annual performances of the St. Matthew and, on occasion the St John Passion, continued until 1989. Between 1958 and 1987 the LBS choir under Steinitz performed all the extant church and secular cantatas, 208 separate works, at various venues and, in the early years of the cycle, in the historic Priory Church of St Bartholomew-the-Great in the City of London in particular. These concerts later moved to the newly built Queen Elizabeth Hall, part of the South Bank Centre. The Society has also broadcast prolifically and toured abroad, performing twice in St. Thomas Church, Leipzig, where Bach had been Cantor from 1723 until his death in 1750.

Paul Steinitz' work with the London Bach Society in the early years was complemented by the foundation in 1955, with Joan Brocklebank, of the Dorset Bach Cantata Club. By then, Steinitz was already contemplating a more considered presentation of the cantatas in a complete public cycle that eventually began in November 1958. In order to allow himself an extra dimension to his study of them, he set up this group of mostly Dorset-based amateur musicians whom he augmented with some semi-professional players. The group met first in Wimborne and later at Sturminster Newton, studying Bach cantatas and related works. The club celebrated its 50th anniversary in 2005.

Paul Steinitz founded Steinitz Bach Players in 1968, a professional group that engaged musicians able to apply Baroque performance practice to their playing. Having introduced the natural/clarino trumpet, baroque flute, the cornett and sackbut into the chamber orchestra earlier in the 1960s, the foundation of an orchestra to join with the London Bach Society's choir was not only a natural progression, but also a significant development of Society as a whole, although initially the orchestra was run as a separate charity. All this was at a time when the use of period instruments, those with which the composer would have been familiar, moved from being an idle curiosity and the fascination of the few to becoming a reality. At foundation Steinitz Bach Players used modern instruments. They moved to period ones later as expertise grew. By 1985 the development of Baroque instruments and the technique of the players was such that the choir was able to perform the St Matthew Passion with a complete orchestra of period instruments and this they did for the opening concert of the 1985 Bath International Music Festival in Wells Cathedral and later in 1987 at Westminster Abbey, the latter being the last time Steinitz conducted the work. In response to the changing times and their respective progress since foundation, the London Bach Society and Steinitz Bach Players were wound up as separate charities in 1983 and a new charity was formed that incorporated both the choir and the orchestra and which expanded the membership provision. This was a major development for the Society, moving it on from being amateur-based to one that is professional. In addition, and having already accumulated a distinguished folio of contemporary works, some written to commission and others given 'first performances' mainly during the 1960s and 1970s, the contemporary music provision in the Society's artistic policy was closed for the time being. With other groups like London Sinfonietta and the Nash Ensemble emerging that were better equipped to promote New Music, Dr. Steinitz felt able to focus his full attention on the completion of the Bach cantata cycle now into its third decade. However, there was one final commission, funded by the Arts Council, from Christopher Brown, to write a cantata as part of Paul Steinitz's 75th birthday series in 1984.

The completion of the Bach cantata series on 12 December 1987 in the Queen Elizabeth Hall was an historic milestone in this country, the first cycle of the extant church and secular cantatas to have been given in the UK complete and in public. Paul Steinitz lived just long enough to fulfil his lifelong ambition, for he died in April 1988 aged 78.

In 1989, a year after Steinitz's death, the decision was taken to disband the amateur choir and to continue in the way that Steinitz had already begun as early as 1976 in the BBC recording studio: a gradual reduction of the choral forces for Bach's vocal works to lead eventually to employing very small groups of professional singers, and with boys’ voices where possible - the latter first revealed with the participation in a BBC recording of cantatas by Salisbury Cathedral Choir in 1979. These would provide the appropriate vocal forces to balance with small groups of period instruments and be both a natural progression and an expression of the Society's underlying musical principles. An annual Bach Festival was subsequently founded by Steinitz's widow Margaret and the first of these took place in 1990. At that time it was known as the London Bach Festival, but today it continues under the title London Bach Society's Bachfest. Building on Steinitz' musical legacy, the events and programmes attempt to place Bach's works in context with his life and times, complemented by those of his antecedents and contemporaries. There have been some significant Bachfest events too. In 1994, Bach's old choir, the Thomanerchor in Leipzig made its UK debut, Gustav Leonhardt directed at the LBS Golden Jubilee in 1996 and gave a rare keyboard recital in 1999, and in 2005 the UK 'live' première of a newly discovered Bach Aria was given, to name but a few. At the annual Bachfest in 2013, the UK 'live' première of Bach's St Matthew Passion in its early version (1727) was performed and a year later CPE Bach's 300th was celebrated.

Under the guidance and leadership of Margaret Steinitz, the London Bach Society has continued to entertain, experiment, uplift and inspire all lovers of Bach's music as well as building up an invaluable database for Bach studies and an imaginative educational programme. In the autumns of 2006 and 2007 the LBS celebrated its Diamond Jubilee at two Bachfests that not only reflected upon past achievements but also pointed the way forward into a new era. In 2009, the centenary of Steinitz' birth was celebrated by launching a Bach Club for 18-30s to be part of the annual Bachfest, the nurturing of young audiences being a Steinitz priority. In 2010 the Society launched a new long-term development plan to locate to a central headquarters from which to operate, house its considerable Library and Archive and promote some new activities.

== LBS Support Network ==
LBS is funded mainly privately and supported by private donors, patrons, trusts, foundations and corporate donors. The Society welcomes new donors in support of its work as a unique Bach Society in the UK. Memberships have ceased to be offered since 2013 when further step-changes in fund-raising were implemented that created a new donor scheme - Bach Friends - and widened the range of sources to tap for financial support as the funding market itself continued to evolve. In addition, during the 2010s the Society received three Arts Council England 'Grants for the Arts ' awards, and in October 2020 a Government Culture Recovery Fund grant to assist the Society through the COVID-19 pandemic was received.
