= Paul Thymich =

German poet

Paul Thymich or Thiemich (17 June 1656, Großenhain – 1694, Leipzig) was a German poet.

== Life ==
Having studied at the Thomasschule zu Leipzig and the University of Leipzig, Thymich served as a teacher at the former from 1681 until his death. He also worked as a secular and religious poet and an opera librettist for the Leipziger Oper and the ducal court at Weißenfels. He wrote the eleven-verse poem "Komm, Jesu, komm" for Johann Schelle (cantor of the Thomasschule from 1677 to his death in 1701) to set to music for the funeral of the school's rector Jacob Thomasius, who died on 9 September 1684 – the text closely follows John 14:6 ("I am the Way, the Truth and the Life, no one comes to the Father except through me") and its first and final verses were later used by Johann Sebastian Bach for his funeral motet of the same name.

== Sources ==
- (in German) Gustav Roethe: Thymich, Paul In: Allgemeine Deutsche Biographie (ADB). Vol 38, Duncker & Humblot, Leipzig 1894, (p. 236 and following).
