= Jauchzet dem Herrn alle Welt (motet) =

Motet with music by Georg Philipp Telemann and Johann Sebastian Bach

Jauchzet dem Herrn alle Welt is a three-movement pasticcio motet for double SATB choir. It includes music by Georg Philipp Telemann and Johann Sebastian Bach. The text of the motet is a German paraphrase of Psalm 100.

There is some doubt as to who compiled the work: it may have been Bach or Gottlob Harrer, who after Bach's death in 1750 succeeded him as Thomaskantor. Jauchzet dem Herrn alle Welt appears as BWV Anh. 160, that is in Anhang III, the annex of spurious works, of the 1998 edition of the Bach-Werke-Verzeichnis (BWV). Later it was renumbered to BWV App. A 4. In the catalogue of works by Telemann (TWV) the motet has the number 8:10.

== History ==
The scribe of one of the extant manuscripts of the work, a manuscript that attributes the work to Bach, was formerly believed to be Johann Christoph Altnickol, Bach's son-in-law, but appears actually to be Johann Christoph Farlau. Thanks to the researches of Peter Wollny, Farlau has been identified as copyist of a number of works by Bach, notably an early version of the St Matthew Passion. Farlau is believed to have studied with Altnickol in the 1750s. His interest in Bach's music continued after Altnickol's death. His copy of Jauchzet dem Herrn alle Welt is dated to the second half of the 18th century (c.1760–1789). Another manuscript of around the same time attributes the work to "Bach and Telemann".

== Movements ==
The first movement of Jauchzet dem Herrn alle Welt is likely an adaptation by Bach of a composition by Telemann.

The second movement of the motet is derived from a composition by Bach: it is based on the second movement of his cantata BWV 28, which also appears as a separate motet for SATB choir BWV 28/2a (Sei Lob und Preis mit Ehren, formerly BWV 231). The church cantata Gottlob! Nun geht das Jahr zu Ende, BWV 28 was premiered by Bach at the end of 1725. The second cantata movement differs from the rest of the cantata in being in motet style. It is based on Johann Gramann's hymn "Nun lob, mein Seel, den Herren" (1530), the melody of which provides a cantus firmus. The cantata movement BWV 28/2 and the motets (BWV 28/2a and TWV 8:10) use different stanzas of the text of the hymn.

The third movement of Jauchzet dem Herrn alle Welt is an adaptation of the "Amen" TWV 1:1066 by Telemann, and was probably added to the composition by Harrer.

== Recordings ==
- Thomanerchor Leipzig, Baroque Brass of London and Capella Thomana conducted by Georg Christoph Biller (recorded February 1997).
