= Komm, Jesu, komm, BWV 229 =

Motet by Johann Sebastian Bach

Komm, Jesu, komm
- BWV 229
- Motet by J. S. Bach
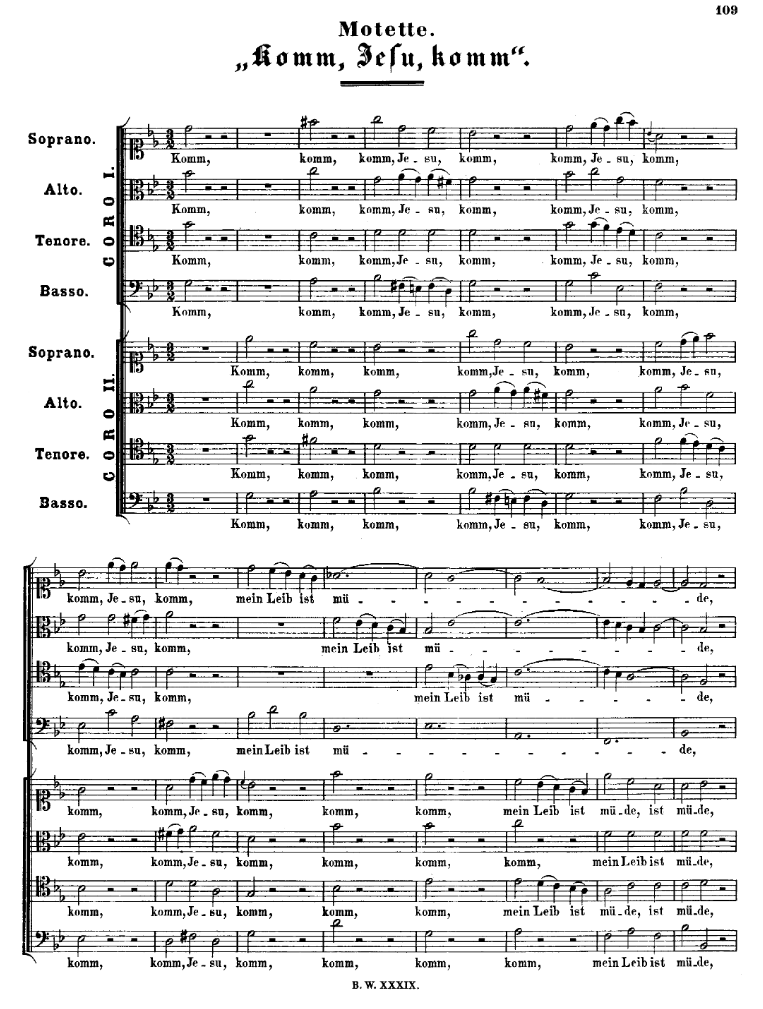
- Manuscript
- Key: G minor
- Occasion: Probably for a funeral
- Text: Paul Thymich
- Performed: By 1731–1732
- Movements: 2
- Vocal: 2 SATB choirs

Komm, Jesu, komm (Come, Jesus, come), BWV 229, is a motet by Johann Sebastian Bach, with a text by Paul Thymich. It was composed in Leipzig, and received its first performance by 1731–1732.

Bach scored the motet for double choir. It was probably composed for a funeral, as were others of his motets but exact dates of composition and performance are not known. It is his only motet without biblical text. He set a poem by Paul Thymich, which Johann Schelle set as a funeral aria in 1684. Also unusually, the motet is not closed by a chorale, but by an aria which is harmonized like a chorale.

The work has been described as having a confident, intimate and tender character, and making more use of polychorality (interplay of the two choirs) than polyphony (interplay of the voices). It also contains a small section of fugato set to the text 'Komm, ich will mich dir ergeben'. The theme of the text is death as the happy moment when man, tired of earthly life, can confide in Jesus, who is seen as Truth and Life and the only way to eternal life.

== History ==
Very little is known about the circumstances surrounding the composition and performance of this work. It is commonly accepted that this is a funeral motet. The musicologist Gilles Cantagrel emphasizes that the work contains elements commonly present in funeral motets, such as the theme of farewell to the world, and the formula "Gute Nacht" (Good night) which is often found in poetry about death, as in another motet by Bach, Jesu, meine Freude, BWV 227, which is known to be a funeral motet.

The text of the motet is the first and eleventh stanza of a poem by Paul Thymich, professor at the Thomasschule of Leipzig where Bach was Thomaskantor. Johann Schelle, a predecessor of Bach at this post, set this text for the funeral of a university professor, the philosopher and jurist Jakob Thomasius who died in 1684. His aria was published in 1697 in Leipzig in a collection of more than five thousand hymns, the Gesangbuch by Paul Wagner (1617–1697), of which Bach had a copy in his library. It is thought that Bach took the text for similar circumstances, and one hypothesis is that he composed the motet for the burial of Johann Schmid, an eminent theologian who died in 1731.

Bach knew Schelle's music, which was a five-part homophonic strophic setting. Bach took a different path, setting the text in two different parts for two four-part choirs. The melody of the second part, an aria, for the last lines shows similarities to Schelle's work.

The autograph manuscript is lost, but a copy is kept at the Berlin State Library, from the hand of the scribe Christoph Nichelmann, a student of Bach who left the Thomasschule in 1731–1732, thus giving the latest possible date for this work.

== Composition ==
Unlike all other Bach motets, Komm, Jesu, komm contains no excerpts directly from the Bible, but is based solely on Thymich's poem. His text is inspired by the Gospel of John and centred on Christ's phrase "I am the way, and the truth, and the life; no one comes to the Father except through me". The musical atmosphere of this motet has been described as intimate and touching, with a climate of trust and appeasement. The key of G minor evokes suffering, but the motet is never tragic. Bach makes relatively little use of polyphony, and in this motet there is a remarkable absence of a full-scale fugue. On the other hand, he uses Venetian polychoral style more than usually. According to John Eliot Gardiner, he explores the responsorial possibilities of the two four-part choirs much further than the Venetian pioneers of polychoral writing, and the formal dialogues between two choirs in works by Giovanni Gabrieli and Heinrich Schütz. The music is structured in two parts, a concerto and an aria, with the concerto subdivided in sections.

=== Concerto ===
The concerto sets the first verse of Thymich's poem. The text structures the music, both in terms of its different sections, and concerning the illustration of the text by the music. Each of the six lines of the stanza leads to a different section and musical treatment, making this part a succession of independent musical panels. The concerto is scored for eight voices in a double chorus, and structured in three sections of different rhythmic and general character.

The first section evokes the suffering of a person near the end of life. When weariness and weakness no longer allow the body to travel the "bitter path of life", it aspires to the peace given by the encounter with Jesus. This movement is dominated by a very expressive minor scale in a triple metre.

The second section provides a contrast, by a metre in common time, imitational writing and its light and trustful character in accord with the text "Come, I will give myself to you". The word Komm (Come!) is highlighted, bouncing repeatedly between voices and choirs, transforming this movement into a trusting call to Jesus.

The third section, moving in the dance rhythm of a menuet, in a "climate of trusting fullness and serenity", is a long statement of faith, particularly emphasizing the key phrase of the motet "You are the right way, the truth and the life." This phrase is repeated no less than four times, by one choir and then by the other, on the same musical theme varying with each assertion, making the motet's longest movement, as if this long moment of "lyricism and ecstasy" never wanted to end.

Structure of the first part
Section	Time	Form	Measure	German text	Translation	Style
1	3/2	A	1—9	Komm, Jesu, komm	Come, Jesus, come,	Antiphonic
1	3/2	A	10—15	Mein Leib ist müde,	My body is weary,	Imitative
1	3/2	B	16—23	Die Kraft verschwindt je mehr und mehr,	My strength is fading more and more,	
1	3/2	B	24—28	idem, variant		
1	3/2	C	29—37	Ich sehne mich	I long	
1	3/2	C	38—43	nach deinem Friede;	for your peace;	
1	3/2	D	44—53	Der saure Weg wird mir zu schwer!	The bitter path becomes too difficult for me!	Imitative
1	3/2	D	53—64	idem, variant		Antiphonic
2	common time		64—78	Komm, ich will mich dir ergeben;	Come, I will give myself to you;	Fugato
3	6/8	A	78—100	Du bist der rechte Weg, die Wahrheit und das Leben.	You are the right path, the truth and life.	
3	6/8	A'	100—122	idem, variant		
3	6/8	A"	122—144	idem, variant		
3	6/8	A"'	144—167	idem, variant		

=== Aria ===
The second part, labeled "Arie" on the copy, looks at first glance like a chorale but differs markedly in a number of aspects. The text of this part is not a traditional hymn text, but the eleventh verse of the same poem by Thymich. The melody is probably by Bach himself. It is indeed closer to an aria because it is freer, more complex and in a higher register than a typical chorale melody, for example by Martin Luther and Johann Crüger. This melody is harmonized in the manner of a chorale, with four voices, with the two choirs merged into one.

An example of the aria's melodic freedom is the final melisma on the word Weg (way), which rises more than one octave, illustrating the ascent to Heaven.

Drum schließ ich mich in deine Hände
So I put myself in your hands

Und sage, Welt, zu guter Nacht!
And I say, world, good night!

Eilt gleich mein Lebenslauf zu Ende,
Even if the course of my life rushes towards the end,

Ist doch der Geist wohl angebracht.
My soul is nevertheless well-prepared.

Er soll bei seinem Schöpfer schweben,
It will rise up to its creator

Weil Jesus ist und bleibt
For Jesus is and remains

Der wahre Weg zum Leben.
The true path to life.

== Bibliography ==
- Cantagrel, Gilles (2011). J.-S. Bach Passions Messes et Motets (in French). Librairie Arthème Fayard. ISBN 978-2-213-66302-9.
- Gardiner, John Eliot (2013). "12". Music in the castle of heaven: A Portrait of Johann Sebastian Bach. London: Penguin. ISBN 978-1-84614-721-0.
- Jones, Richard D. P. (2013). The Creative Development of Johann Sebastian Bach, Volume II: 1717–1750: Music to Delight the Spirit. Oxford University Press. ISBN 978-0-19-969628-4.
- Mathesen, John A. (1967). The six authentic motets of J. S. Bach. Texas University Press.
- Melamed, Daniel (2013). J. S. Bach and the German Motet. Cambridge University Press.
- "Komm, Jesu, komm BWV 229; BC C 3 / Motet". Bach Digital. 2018.
