= Lobet den Herrn, alle Heiden, BWV 230 =

Motet by Johann Sebastian Bach

Lobet den Herrn, BWV 230
St. Andrew's Choir. Easter 2012

Lobet den Herrn, BWV 230
Keyboard only.

Lobet den Herrn, alle Heiden (Praise the Lord, all ye nations), BWV 230, is a motet by Johann Sebastian Bach.

== Words ==
The motet draws its text from Psalm 117 Verses 1-2. A couple of Bach's other motets are known to have been composed for funerals in Leipzig and set texts such as the Epistle to the Romans. The celebratory text of Lobet den Herrn does not suggest a farewell to the world, indicating that it was composed for a different type of occasion.

== History ==
It is not known when the work was composed. Some scholars, for example Martin Geck, have questioned the attribution to Bach. In the twentieth century the authoritative Bach-Werke-Verzeichnis catalogue included it in a set of motets, listed as BWV 225–231. This grouping is only slightly different from the set of six works traditionally described as the Bach motets after having been published together in the 19th century. In retrospect, the juxtaposition of the BWV 225-231 works seems somewhat arbitrary as a grouping of the Bach motets: recent scholarship includes more works among the motets. However, Lobet den Herrn has often been recorded with others from BWV 225–229.

It is the only one of the set to be scored for four voices (most of the others are for double SATB choir). It is also unusual in that (lightly scored) instrumental accompaniment is specified.

== Publication ==
=== 19th century editions ===
It was first published in 1821. The publisher claimed to have had access to an autograph score.

In 1892 it was published with other motets in volume 39 of the Bach-Gesellschaft-Ausgabe, the first edition of the composer's complete works. The editor was Franz Wüllner.

=== 20th century editions ===
It was included in the New Bach Edition in 1965.

=== 21st century editions ===
It was published by Carus-Verlag as one of seven motets edited by Uwe Wolf. The editor acknowledges some doubt about the authenticity of the work, explaining that "in contrast to the 'classical' number of six works we have published seven compositions in this volume of motets: five undoubtedly authentic works by Johann Sebastian Bach and two whose authenticity is less certain".

== Discography ==
Lobet den Herrn has often been recorded with other motets by Bach. These recorded sets of motets are partially listed at Discography of motets by Johann Sebastian Bach.

== Sources ==
- Wolf, Uwe, ed. (2002). "Johann Sebastian Bach / Motetten / Motets" (PDF). Carus-Verlag.
