= Johann Gottfried Schicht =

German composer and conductor (1753–1823)

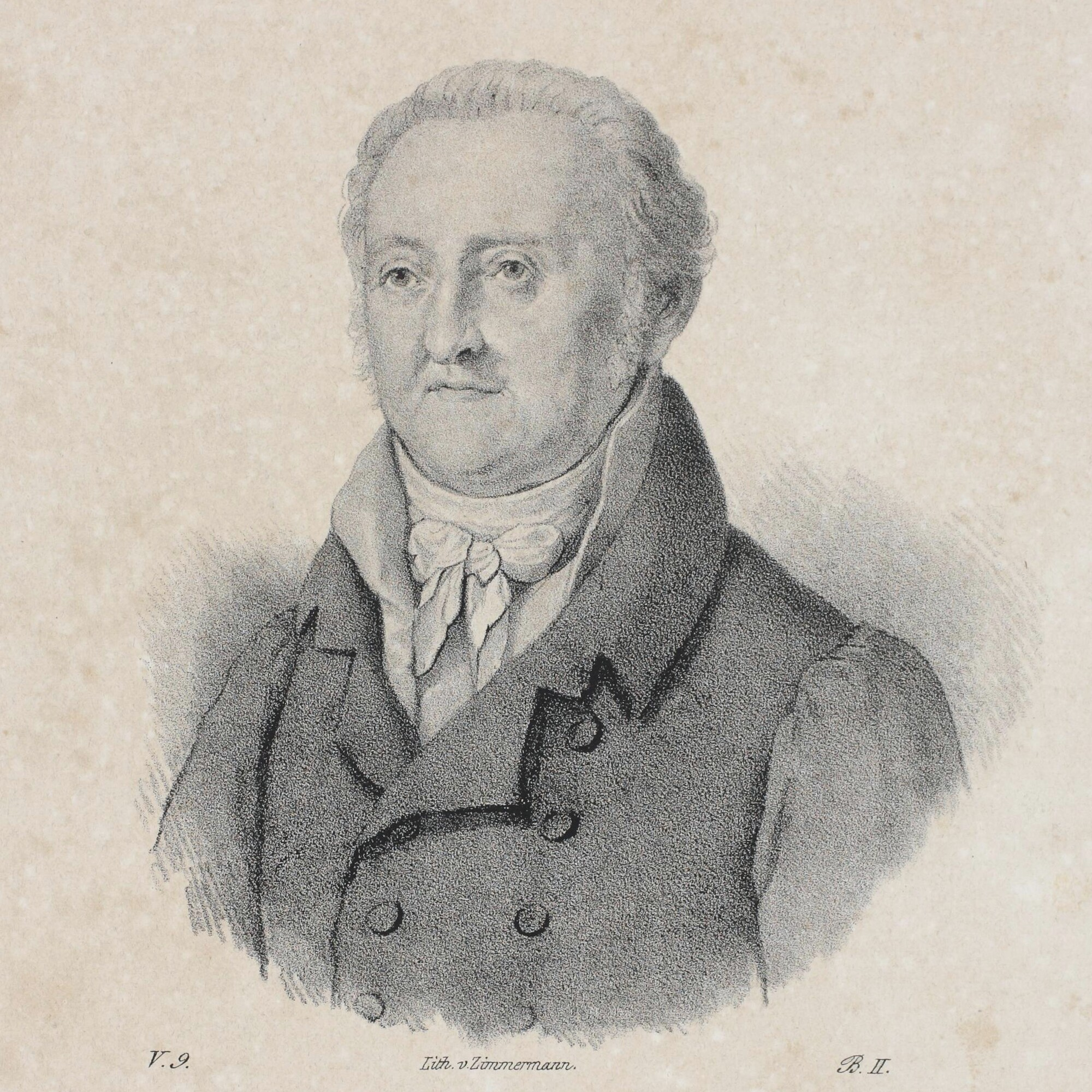
Johann Gottfried Schicht

Johann Gottfried Schicht (29 September 1753 – 16 February 1823) was a German composer and conductor.

Schicht was born in Reichenau, in the Electorate of Saxony. He studied Law in Leipzig before becoming the conductor of the Leipzig Gewandhaus Orchestra in 1785. He held this role until 1810, when he was replaced by Johann Philipp Christian Schulz. Schicht continued to work in Leipzig, serving as Thomaskantor, director of the Thomanerchor with responsibility for music in the city's churches. He was in post from 1810 until 1823, when he died, aged 69, in Leipzig.

His most important work is a great choirbook from 1819. Besides that, he wrote masses, motets, cantatas, a setting of the 100th Psalm, four Te deums, one piano concerto, sonatas and capriccio.

He is believed to have been the editor of the first edition of Bach's motets.
