= Warum betrübst du dich, mein Herz =

16th-century Lutheran hymn

- Lutheran hymn
- Catalogue: Zahn 1689a
- Language: German
- Composed: 16th century

"Warum betrübst du dich, mein Herz" (Why are you afflicted, my heart) is a Lutheran hymn. According to some sources, both hymn writer and composer are anonymous. The melody, Zahn No. 1689a, appeared on broadsides from the mid-16th century in Nürnberg, one of them dated 1561. For a while the tune had been attributed to Hans Sachs.

Johann Sebastian composed a chorale cantata on the hymn, Warum betrübst du dich, mein Herz, BWV 138.

== Bibliography ==
- Möller, Christian (ed.), Ich singe dir mit Herz und Mund. Liedauslegungen – Liedmeditationen – Liedpredigten. Ein Arbeitsbuch zum Evangelischen Gesangbuch, Stuttgart 1997, ISBN 3-7668-3525-4
- Thost, Karl Christian, Bibliographie über die Lieder des Evangelischen Gesangbuchs, Göttingen 2006, ISBN 3-525-50336-9
