= Buxheim Organ Book =

Manuscript of keyboard compositions

The Buxheim Organ Book (German: Buxheimer Orgelbuch) is a manuscript created around 1460/1470 with 256 original compositions and arrangements for keyboard instruments for the Buxheim Charterhouse in Germany, in today's district of Unterallgäu. Most of the composers are anonymous, but some are also known composers of the time (e.g. John Dunstable, Guillaume Du Fay, Gilles Binchois, Walter Frye, Conrad Paumann).

== Structure ==
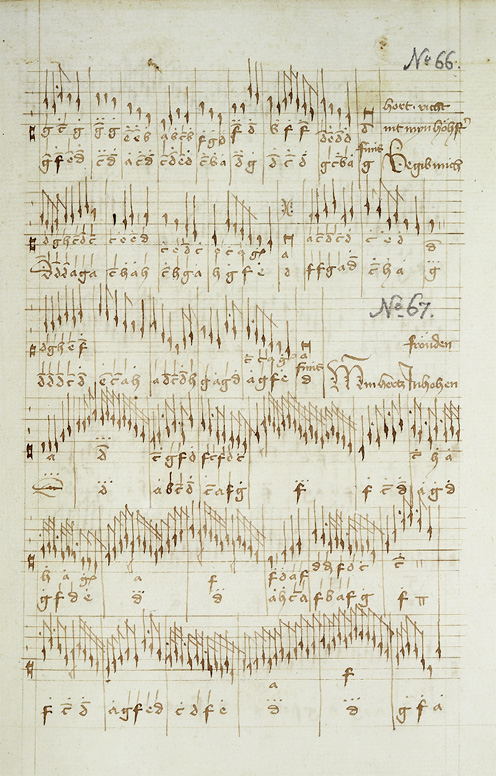
A page from the Buxheim Organ Book as preserved in Bavarian State Library, Munich

In addition to arrangements of secular chansons, dances and songs, it contains about fifty pieces of liturgical character and about thirty preludes, in which rhapsodic-figurative and purely chordal parts alternate. The pieces are mostly two- and three-part, but several are four-part.

The research is still at odds with the origins of the Buxheim Organ Book. There are no records of its use, so it can therefore be regarded as a transcript for teaching (or illustration) purposes. Presumably it came from a writer from the southern German area and was in the possession of the Buxheim Charterhouse near Memmingen from 16th century and until 1883, when it was offered for sale and has been owned by the Bavarian State Library in Munich since then. The manuscript is often attributed to Conrad Paumann, because his "Fundamentum organisandi" is included in its entirety. This would mean that the manuscript originates from Munich, since from 1450 until his death in 1473, Paumann worked as a Bavarian court organist in Munich. Paumann's "Fundamentum organisandi" is also included in the Lochamer-Liederbuch, compiled around the same time.

The tabular inscription of the Buxheim Organ Book consists of a seven-line system and letters, the so-called "older" German organ tablature.

== Discography ==
- Buxheimer Orgelbuch vol. 1, Joseph Payne, Berner Münster (1995, Naxos 8.553 466)
- Buxheimer Orgelbuch vol. 2, Joseph Payne, Emmaus-Kapelle, Hatzfeld (1995, Naxos 8.553 467)
- Buxheimer Orgelbuch vol. 3, Joseph Payne, Southern College of 7th-Day Adventists, Tennessee (1995, Naxos 8.553 468)
- Das Buxheimer Orgelbuch, Joseph Kelemen, Hofkirche Innsbruck (SACD, 2010, OehmsClassics OC645)

== Literature ==
- Lord R.S. The Buxheim Organ Book: a study in the history of organ music in Southern Germany during the fifteenth century. Diss., Yale University, 1960.
- Southern E. The Buxheim Organ Book. New York, 1963.
- Zöbeley H.R. Die Musik des Buxheimer Orgelbuchs. Spielvorgang, Niederschrift, Herkunft, Faktur // Münchner Veröffentlichungen zur Musikgeschichte, 10. Tutzing: H. Schneider, 1964.
