= Herr Christ, der einge Gottessohn, BWV 96 =

Chorale cantata by Johann Sebastian Bach

Herr Christ, der einge Gottessohn
- BWV 96
- Chorale cantata by J. S. Bach
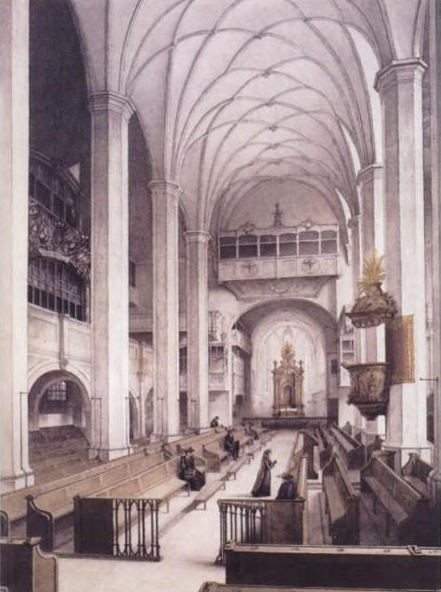
- Thomaskirche, Leipzig
- Occasion: 18th Sunday after Trinity
- Chorale: "Herr Christ, der einig Gotts Sohn" by Elisabeth Cruciger
- Performed: 8 October 1724: Leipzig
- Movements: 6
- Vocal: SATB choir and solo
- Instrumental: horn; flauto traverso; flauto piccolo; 2 oboes; 2 violins; viola; continuo

Johann Sebastian Bach composed the church cantata Herr Christ, der einge Gottessohn (Lord Christ, the only Son of God), BWV 96, in Leipzig for the 18th Sunday after Trinity and first performed it on 8 October 1724. The chorale cantata, part of Bach's second annual cycle, is based on the hymn in five stanzas "Herr Christ, der einig Gotts Sohn" by Elisabeth Cruciger, published in Eyn geystlich Gesangk Buchleyn in 1524.

The hymn, related to mysticism and comparing Jesus to the Morning star, matches two aspects of the prescribed gospel for the Sunday, the Great Commandment and a theological dispute about the term "Son of David". An unknown poet kept the first and last stanza for the first and last movement of the cantata, and paraphrased the inner stanzas as four movements, alternating recitative and aria. Bach set the first stanza as a chorale fantasia with the cantus firmus in the alto, adding sparkle by a "dancing" soprano and the illumination of a sopranino, which he used for the first time in his cantatas. In the four inner movements, all four vocal parts have their solo. A tenor aria is accompanied by an obbligato transverse flute, a part written for a virtuoso player. A bass aria is accompanied by an oboe and strings, acting as in a Venetian concerto. The cantata is closed with a simple four-part setting of the hymn tune. Bach performed the cantata again in later years, with minor changes to the scoring.

== History and text ==
Bach wrote the cantata in 1724 for the 18th Sunday after Trinity as part of his second annual cycle of mostly chorale cantatas. The prescribed readings for the Sunday were from the First Epistle to the Corinthians, Paul's thanks for grace of God in Ephesus (1 Corinthians 1:4–8), and from the Gospel of Matthew, the Great Commandment (Matthew 22:34–46), also mentioning that the byname "Son of David" was discussed in a "theological dispute" of Jesus and the pharisees.

The cantata text of an unknown author is based exclusively on the hymn "Herr Christ, der einig Gotts Sohn" in five stanzas by Elisabeth Cruciger (1524). The hymn is based on a Latin Christmas hymn, "Corde natus ex parentis", by Aurelius Prudentius. It is the first hymn by a Lutheran reformer which continues late medieval mysticism. Martin Luther appreciated the hymn so much that he placed it at the beginning of an early hymnal, Eyn geystlich Gesangk Buchleyn. The chorale was originally associated with Epiphany, but also with the 18th Sunday after Trinity.

The hymn's first and last stanza in their original wording became the outer movements, as usual in Bach's chorale cantatas. The unknown librettist paraphrased stanzas 2 and 3 to the cantata's respective movements, and stanza 4 to movements 4 and 5. The Gospel asks how Jesus, of David's descent as said in 2 Samuel 7, can also be David's Lord, as claimed in Psalms 110:1. The hymn tries to answer this question, comparing Jesus to the Morning star, an image also used in the hymn "Wie schön leuchtet der Morgenstern", the base for Bach's cantata Wie schön leuchtet der Morgenstern, BWV 1.

Bach performed the cantata at least three times, first on 8 October 1724, a second time probably on 24 October 1734 when the sopranino was replaced by a violino piccolo, and a third time probably on 1 October 1740. The Bach scholar Christoph Wolff suggested performances in 1744/47, Klaus Hofmann in 1747, when the corno part was given to a trombone.

== Music ==
=== Structure and scoring ===
Bach structured the cantata in six movements, framing alternating recitatives and arias by an opening chorale fantasia and a closing four-part chorale. He scored it for soprano, alto, tenor and bass soloists, a four-part choir, and an ensemble of Baroque instruments: horn (Co) or (later) trombone to enforce the hymn tune, flauto traverso (Ft), flauto piccolo (Fp) or (later) violino piccolo, two oboes (Ob), two violins (Vl), viola (Va), cello (Vc), and basso continuo. The title page of the autograph score reads: "Concerto. / Dominica 18. post. Trinit: / Herr Christ der einge Gottes Sohn etc. / a / Traversiere / 2 Hautbois / 2 Violini / Viola / Canto / Alto / Tenore / Basso / e / Continuo. / d. J.S. Bach".

In the following table of the movements, the scoring follows the Neue Bach-Ausgabe. The keys and time signatures are taken from Alfred Dürr, using the symbol for common time (4/4). The continuo, playing throughout, is not shown.

Movements of Herr Christ, der einge Gottessohn
No.	Title	Text	Type	Vocal	Winds	Strings	Key	Time
1	Herr Christ, der einge Gottessohn	Cruciger	Chorale fantasia	SATB	Co Fp 2Ob	2Vl Va	F major	9/8
2	O Wunderkraft der Liebe	anon.	Recitative	A				common time
3	Ach, ziehe die Seele mit Seilen der Liebe	anon	Aria	T	Ft		C major	common time
4	Ach, führe mich, o Gott, zum rechten Wege	anon.	Recitative	S				common time
5	Bald zur Rechten, bald zur Linken	anon.	Aria	B	2Ob	2Vl Va	D minor	3/4
6	Ertöt uns durch dein Güte	Cruciger	Chorale	SATB	Co 2Ob	2Vl Va	F major	common time

=== Movements ===
==== 1 ====
As in most cantatas of the second cycle, Bach set the opening chorus on the first stanza of the hymn in its original wording, "Herr Christ, der einge Gottessohn" (Lord Christ, only Son of God), as chorale fantasia. He assigned the cantus firmus to the alto, enforced by a horn (in later performance replaced by trombone). Bach had used a cantus firmus in the alto already in his chorale cantata Ach Gott, vom Himmel sieh darein, BWV 2, for the second Sunday after Trinity. In Herr Christ, der einge Gottessohn, this leaves the sopranos free, as the musicologist Julian Mincham notes, "to dance their own hymn of joy in the upper register above the chorale tune, thus lightening the texture and mood of the entire chorus". An unusual flauto piccolo or sopranino recorder is used to illustrate the sparkling of the morning star. Hofmann notes that it was Bach's first use of a sopranino in a cantata, and the first introduction of his Leipzig audience to the instrument which had not been used as a concert instrument. In a later performance (probably 1734) it was replaced by a violino piccolo. The choral setting is polyphonic in the three other voices and embedded in instrumental music based on similar motifs.

==== 2 ====
The first recitative for alto, "O Wunderkraft der Liebe" (O wondrous power of love), is secco, only accompanied by the continuo. It refers to Jesus as descendant of David and son of Mary, reflecting the Virgin birth. John Eliot Gardiner, who conducted in 2000 the Bach Cantata Pilgrimage and performed this cantata in Leipzig's Thomaskirche, notes that the cantata's two recitatives are "exemplary even by Bach's standards in their economy of means and richness of expression. Mincham notes that a "flowing bass line" is heard when one line is quoted from the hymn, referring to "the end of earthly time".

==== 3 ====
The tenor aria, "Ach, ziehe die Seele mit Seilen der Liebe" (Ah, draw my soul with skeins of love), is accompanied by the transverse flute, probably played by the flauto piccolo player of the first movement. As for Was frag ich nach der Welt, BWV 94, written some weeks before, Bach seems to have had an excellent flute player at hand, whom he used in twelve cantatas in the fall of 1724. Some musicologists think that he was Friedrich Gottlieb Wild, a law student.

==== 4 ====
The recitative for soprano, "Ach, führe mich, o Gott, zum rechten Wege" (Ah, lead me, o God, to the right path), is a prayer for God's guidance.

==== 5 ====
The bass aria illustrates the words "Bald zur Rechten, bald zur Linken lenkte sich mein verirrter Schritt" (Soon to the right, soon to the left my erring steps leaned) in jagged motifs and a frequent switch between winds and strings. In the middle section steady steps picture "Gehe doch, mein Heiland, mit" (Yet go with me, my Savior). The final part combines both elements. Gardiner notes that Bach uses the winds and strings in concerting choirs (cori spezzati), enforced by positioning them on galleries, one of them right, the other left of the singers. The technique had been practised in Venice in the late sixteenth century and introduced in Germany by composers such as Heinrich Schütz who studied in Venice. Gardiner observes also a hint at the style of French opera which Bach may have heard, traveling as a boy in northern Germany, at the Hamburg opera, in Celle or Lüneburg.

==== 6 ====
The closing chorale,"Ertöt uns durch dein Güte" (Kill us through your goodness), is a four-part setting for the choir, horn, oboes and strings playing colla parte with the voices.

== Recordings ==
The entries are taken from the listing on Bach Cantatas Website. Instrumental groups playing period instruments in historically informed performances are marked green under the header Instr..

Recordings of Herr Christ, der einge Gottessohn
Title	Conductor / Choir / Orchestra	Soloists	Label	Year	Instr.
Die Bach Kantate Vol. 52	Helmuth Rilling Gächinger Kantorei Bach-Collegium Stuttgart	Helen Donath; Marga Höffgen; Adalbert Kraus; Siegmund Nimsgern	Hänssler	1973	
Bach Cantatas Vol. 5 – Sundays after Trinity II	Karl Richter Münchener Bach-Chor Münchener Bach-Orchester	Edith Mathis; Trudeliese Schmidt; Peter Schreier; Dietrich Fischer-Dieskau	Archiv Produktion	1978	Period
J. S. Bach: Das Kantatenwerk – Sacred Cantatas Vol. 5	Gustav Leonhardt Tölzer Knabenchor Leonhardt-Consort	Soloist of the Tölzer Knabenchor; Paul Esswood; Kurt Equiluz; Philippe Huttenlocher	Teldec	1979	Period
Bach Cantatas Vol. 9: Lund / Leipzig / For the 17th Sunday after Trinity / For the 18th Sunday after Trinity	John Eliot Gardiner Monteverdi Choir English Baroque Soloists	Katharine Fuge; Nathalie Stutzmann; Christoph Genz; Gotthold Schwarz	Soli Deo Gloria	2000	Period
J.S. Bach: Solokantaten Kreuzstabkantate BWV 56; "Der Friede sei mit dir" BWV 158; "Ich habe genug" BWV 82	Karl-Friedrich Beringer Windsbacher Knabenchor Consortium Musicum	Siegmund Nimsgern	Baier Records	1991	
J. S. Bach: Complete Cantatas Vol. 13	Ton Koopman Amsterdam Baroque Orchestra & Choir	Deborah York; Franziska Gottwald; Paul Agnew; Klaus Mertens	Antoine Marchand	2000	Period
J. S. Bach: Cantatas Vol. 26	Masaaki Suzuki Bach Collegium Japan	Yukari Nonoshita; Timothy Kenworthy-Brown; Makoto Sakurada; Peter Kooy	BIS	2003	Period
J.S. Bach: Cantatas for the Complete Liturgical Year Vol. 12: "Warum betrübst du dich, mein Herz" (Cantatas BWV 138, 27, 47, 96)	Sigiswald Kuijken La Petite Bande	Gerlinde Samann; Petra Noskaiova; Christoph Genz; Jan Van der Crabben	Accent Label (Germany)	2009	Period
Bachkantaten N°20 (BWV 96, 67, 121)	Rudolf Lutz Schola Seconda Pratica	Noemi Sohn; Jan Borner; Julius Pfeifer; Wolf-Matthias Friedrich	J.S. Bach-Stiftung	2011	Period
Bach: Cantatas BWV 78, 96, 100, 122, 127, 130, 180 (Cantatas from liturgical year from the annual cycle of cantatas 1724/25)	Christoph Spering Das Neue Orchester	Hannah Morrison; Marion Eckstein; Daniel Behle; Daniel Ochoa	Deutsche Harmonia Mundi	2021	Period

== Sources ==
- Herr Christ, der einge Gottessohn, BWV 96: Scores at the International Music Score Library Project
- Herr Christ, der einge Gottessohn BWV 96; BC A 142 / Chorale cantata (18th Sunday after Trinity) Bach Digital
- BWV 96 Herr Christ, der einge Gottessohn English translation, University of Vermont
- Luke Dahn: BWV 96.6 bach-chorales.com
