= Friedrich Wilhelm Arnold =

German musician and publisher (1810–1864)

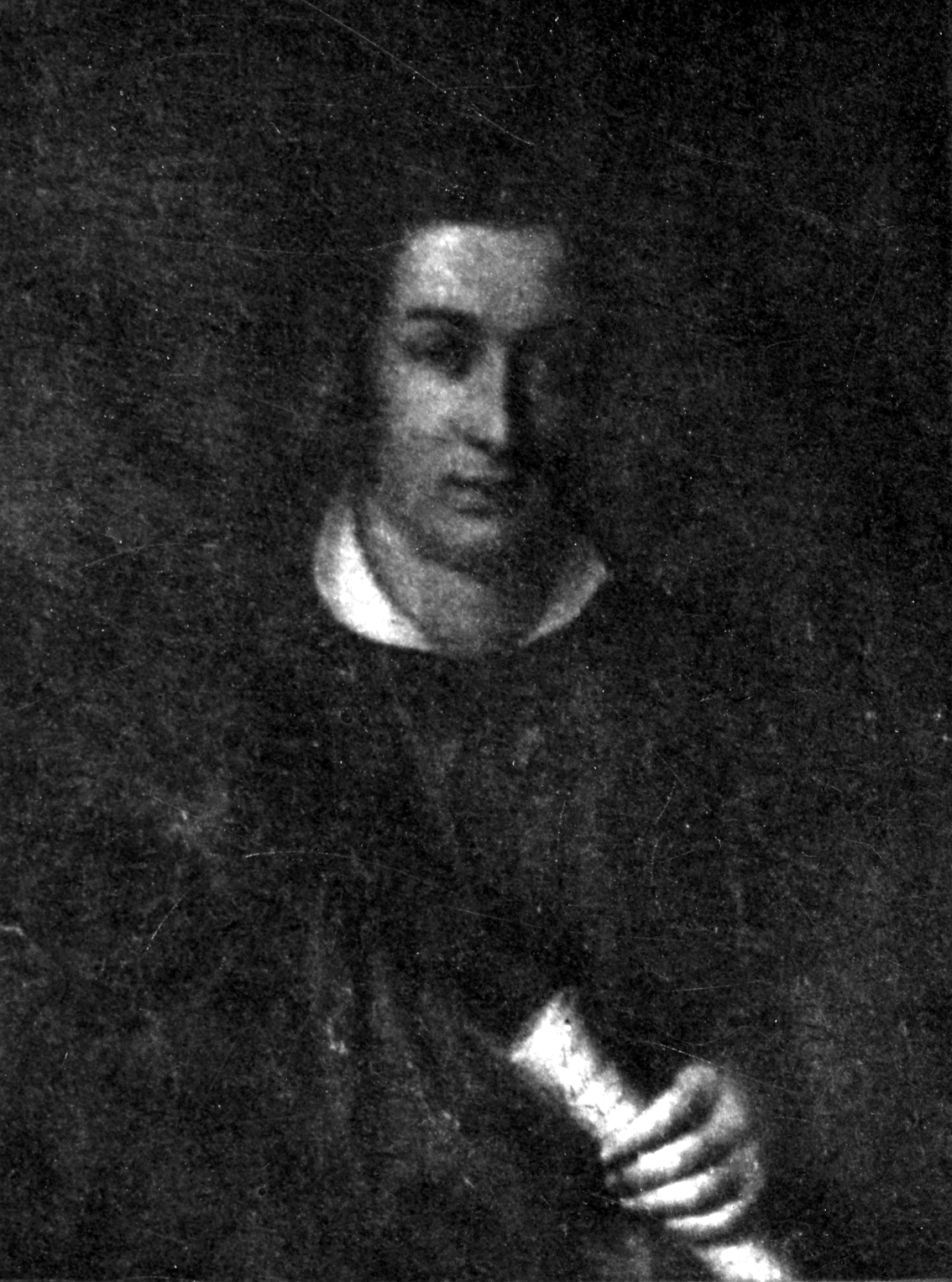
Friedrich Wilhelm Arnold in academic attire holding the manuscript of his novella "Die Blutbrücke"

Friedrich Wilhelm Arnold (3 March 1810 – 12 February 1864) was a German musician, music seller, publisher and folk-song collector.

== Biography ==
Arnold grew up on his parents' estate in Sontheim in the Kingdom of Württemberg. From an early age on, he received instruction in music from his father, a music director. He studied theology and philosophy in Tübingen and Freiburg and received his doctoral degree in 1832. His professional life began in Cologne where he worked as a feuilleton editor, a theater and opera critic, choir director of the German Opera and as dramatic advisor. Between 1835 and 1840 he was director and co-owner of Eck & Comp., a music publisher and supplier in Cologne. During this period Arnold also wrote historical short stories and, between 1835 and 1841, published several as novellas. He also prepared a number of volumes of the music periodical "Pfennig-Magazin für Gesang und Guitarre" ("Penny Magazine for Song and Guitar") as well as publishing his own arrangements for guitar, piano and violin.

In 1836 he married Maria Henriette Amalia Frambach (1805–1867), daughter of the director of public finances of the city of Cologne Johann Heinrich Frambach (1771–1821). The couple had three children: Ursula (born 1837), Jakob (1840–1877) and Agnes (1843–1876). Ursula, also known as Lina, received piano instruction from Clara Schumann and Johannes Brahms, with both of whom she maintained contact throughout her life. Jakob, who also went by the name Emil, took over his father's business after his death.

In 1841 Arnold moved to Elberfeld, founded his own music business and, seven years later, a music publishing house. He published over 700 works, including pieces by Ludwig van Beethoven, Franz Liszt, Felix Mendelssohn Bartholdy, Wolfgang Amadeus Mozart, Robert Schumann and Franz Schubert. He had business relations and personal contact to several contemporary composers including Robert and Clara Schumann as well as Johannes Brahms.

As of 1850 Arnold was increasingly occupied with research on the German folk-song. In this he collaborated with like-minded scholars such as Philipp Wackernagel, Anton Wilhelm von Zuccalmaglio, Karl Simrock, Johannes Brahms and Ludwig Uhland. One outcome of his extensive research was his folk-song collection "Deutsche Volkslieder aus alter und neuer Zeit" ("German Folk-Songs from Old and New Times") which was published posthumously.

In the late 1850s Arnold gained access to the "Locheimer Liederbuch" ("Lochamer Song Book"), a manuscript with songs from the late Middle Ages to the early Renaissance, which he began to edit. In 1863 the editor of the "Jahrbücher für musikalische Wissenschaft" ("Annals of Musical Science"), Friedrich Chrysander, invited Arnold to submit this work for publication. Shortly before his death on February 12, 1864, resulting from a stroke, Arnold sent his manuscript to Chrysander. After a revision by Heinrich Bellermann, the Arnold edition was published in the Jahrbücher in 1867.

== Works ==
=== Novellas ===
- Der Virtuose aus Genua (The Virtuoso from Genoa). In: Hell T (Ed.). Penelope. Taschenbuch für das Jahr 1835, Vol. 24. Leipzig, JC Hinrichsche Buchhandlung. 1835, 227–353.
- Der Chouan. Historische Novelle aus dem letzten Dezennium (The Chouan. A Historical Novella from the Last Decade). Leipzig, Chr. E. Kollmann. 1841, 388 pp.
- Der Virtuose aus Genua (The Virtuoso from Genoa). Die Sternauer (The Sternauers). Leipzig, Chr. E. Kollmann. 1841, 301 pp.
- Die Blutbrücke (The Blood Bridge), 'Der Geächtete (The Outlaw), Das Nebelmännchen (The Fog Man). Leipzig, Chr. E. Kollmann. 1841, 354 pp.

=== Editor ===
- Pfennig-Magazin für Gesang und Guitarre. Köln, Gaul & Tonger, 1834-5 (Vol. 1). Later: HEBE ein Pfennig-Magazin für Freunde und Freundinnen des Gesanges und der Guitarre. Köln, Gaul & Tonger, 1837 (Vol. 2), 1838 (Vol. 3), 1839 (Vol. 4).
- Arnold FW. Deutsche Volkslieder, aus alter und neuer Zeit gesammelt und mit Clavierbegleitung versehen. Elberfeld, Arnold. 1864–1871: Heft 1–9.
- Arnold FW. Das Locheimer Liederbuch nebst der Ars Organisandi von Conrad Paumann. In: Chrysander F, (Ed.). Jahrbücher für musikalische Wissenschaft, Band II. Leipzig, Breitkopf & Härtel. 1867:1–234.

== Sources ==
- Marie-Luise Baum. Arabeske aus der Wuppertaler Musikgeschichte. Zum Gedenken an F. W. Arnold. In: Unsere bergische Heimat, Heimatkundliche Monatsbeilage zum General-Anzeiger der Stadt Wuppertal, Mitteilungsblatt des Bergischen Geschichtsvereins, Vol.10 (October 28, 1961), p. 1–2.
- Friedrich Chrysander, Heinrich Bellermann. Nachwort. In: Chrysander F (Ed.). Jahrbücher für musikalische Wissenschaft, Band II. Leipzig, Breitkopf & Härtel 1867, p. 225–234.
- r.s. FW Arnold, +11.2.1864: ein kurzer Nekrolog. In: Elberfelder Zeitung 1864, No. 58 (February 27, 1864).
- Ernst-Gottfried Risch. 100 Jahre dienst an Wuppertals Musik. Zum Geschäftsjubiläum der Musikhandlung A.P. Küpper. General-Anzeiger Wuppertal, October 25/26, 1941.
- Barbara Schwendowius. Friedrich Wilhelm Arnold. Dietrich Kämper (dd.). Rheinische Musiker, Vol. 7. In Beiträge Zur Rheinischen Musikgeschichte, Heft 97. Arno-Volk-verlag, Cologne 1972, pp. 9–14.
- Florian Speer. Klaviere und Flügel aus dem Wupperthale – Instrumentenbau in der Wupperregion und am Niederrhein während des 19. Jahrhunderts am Beispiel der Orgel- und Klavierbauerfamilie Ibach. Gesamthochschule Wuppertal. Dissertation, February 2000, 680 pp.
- Arrey von Dommer: Arnold, Friedrich Wilhelm. In: Allgemeine Deutsche Biographie (ADB). Vol.1, Duncker & Humblot, Leipzig 1875, p. 585 f.
