= Joseph Payne (musician) =

British musician (1937-2008)

Joseph Payne (6 July 1937 – 14 January 2008) was a British/Swiss German harpsichordist, clavichordist, organist and musicologist, whose worldwide reputation was based on his performances of music of all periods, though best known for his pioneering recordings of early keyboard music accompanied by his meticulously informative liner notes.

He was born in the Chahar province of China in 1937, the son of a British father, Joseph (c.1909–1955), and a Swiss-German mother, Wilhelmina ("Mina", 1908–1993), who were licensed preachers and missionaries to Mongolia. During World War II he and his family were imprisoned in a Japanese internment camp in Shanghai. The family subsequently moved to England and then to Switzerland, where Payne received his primary musical education. where, while studying at the Collège de Vevey, Payne exhibited an aptitude for languages and an interest in the music of Johann Sebastian Bach and started receiving musical education.

Payne's family moved again, this time to Connecticut, where his father became the pastor of Faith Assembly of God in Hartford. However, Rev. Payne's health had been compromised by the tortures of the internment camp, from which he never fully recovered. He served the Hartford church from 1951 till a fatal heart attack on 12 November 1955, at age 46. (His death was a blow to the church, which under his leadership doubled in size.) Meanwhile, his son Joseph studied at Trinity College and Hartt College of Music; his teachers included Raymond Hanson, Noretta Conci, Clarence Watters, Joseph Marx, Luigi Silva and Fernando Valenti; he was the last, youngest pupil of Wanda Landowska. While at Hartt, he met cellist Phoebe Joyce, who became his wife in 1966. The young couple settled in Cambridge, Massachusetts. Payne served for many years as lecturer at Boston University and He lectured at Northeastern University and at the Boston Architectural Center. He toured extensively throughout North America and then in Europe, where his first appearances were under the aegis of the BBC. For many years he was organist and music director for Emmanuel Episcopal Church, Boston; under his direction, WGBH offered the first live broadcast in North America of a Christmastime Festival of Lessons and Carols. His most personal and signal honour was the invitation to play at the reinaugration of the restored Wenzelkirche organ at Naumburg, the only large organ designed by Bach. Though his performance debut featured contemporary music, and though he gave the first performances of works by Norman Dello Joio, Elliott Carter, Charles Wuorinen, Arnold Franchetti and other prominent contemporaries and was the accompanist of Joan Sutherland on her first American tour, he was most widely known as a harpsichord recitalist who specialised in the work of Baroque composers, some of them little known. (Notable performances included a 1973 appearance in the Peabody Mason Concert series in Boston.) He started a recording career with the Haydn Society and from the 1960s onwards he made over a hundred solo recordings, recording for Vox, Turnabout, Decca and Musical Heritage labels: in 1964 his was the first recording of selections from the Fitzwilliam Virginal Book a contemporaneous anthology of Elizabethan works for keyboard. His Spaced-out Bach (RCA Victor Red Seal) explored the quadraphonic technology and enjoyed a cross-over success. A 1995 music review in The Boston Globe began "Organist Joseph Payne has probably recorded more music than most people have heard." Across Europe he sought to record on historically appropriate organs, applying his impeccable attention to stylistic detail. His concertising extended to radio– notably his PBS series The Bach Connection for the Bach tercentenary– and television, for which he composed and performed music for PBS' Classic Theater, Nova and Revolutionary Women.

In the early 1980s Payne accepted an invitation from the Episcopal Parish of All Saints, Ashmont, Massachusetts, and the family moved to Dorchester. For nine years Payne worked as organist and directed the church's choirs, including the Choir of Men and Boys. There he made a mark as a musical evangelist among the young, and the Men and Boys at All Saints performed in many venues, including radio and television; and was featured in national magazines.

After several years, Payne left the Ashmont church and concentrated on his recording career. In early 2000s this was cut short by a stroke, which left Payne unable to play to his own exacting standard. He turned his attention to photography, and in late 2006 the family moved to Mount Vernon, Maine. On 14 January 2008 Payne died of a heart attack. He was survived by wife and his son Christopher Payne, photographer.

Payne's discography contains nearly 100 items, most being recordings of early keyboard music. This includes the complete organ works of Johann Pachelbel, the complete keyboard works of John Blow, recordings of music by numerous neglected composers including John Bull, Gottlieb Muffat and Johan Helmich Roman. In addition to the Fitzwilliam Virginal Book he also recorded extensive selections from other important early music manuscripts, such as the Buxheimer Orgelbuch, the Andreas Bach Buch, the Dublin Virginal Manuscript, and the chorales in the Neumeister Collection, of which he made the world-premiere recording, J.S. Bach Choral Preludes (Harmonia Mundi} recorded and released prior to the recording by Werner Jacob). Record labels with which Payne worked included Bis, Naxos, Harmonia Mundi, Hänssler Classics and others.

Payne worked for radio, producing several syndicated series such as The Bach Connection.

His son, Christopher, is a photographer working from New York City.

== Partial discography ==
- Albero: Harpsichord Sonatas (Bis)
- Bach: Chorale Preludes (Neumeister Chorales) (Harmonia Mundi)
- Bach: French Suites (Bis)
- Bach: Goldberg Variations (Bis)
- Bach: Klavierbüchlein for Wilhelm Friedemann Bach (Hanssler Classics)
- Bull: Pavans and Galliards (Bis)
- Couperin (François): Pièces de Clavecin (Bis)
- Dieupart: Six Suitees de Clavesin (Centaur)
- Duphly: Pièces de Clavecin (Centaur)
- Muffat (Gottlieb): Componimenti Musicali per il cembalo (Centaur)
- Pachelbel: The Complete Organ Works (Centaur)
- Pachelbel: Keyboard Suites (Bis)
- Roman: 12 Suites for Harpsichord (Bis)
- Scarlatti: Essercizi per gravicembalo (Bis)
- Stanford: Organ Sonatas, Opp. 151–153 (Marco Polo)
- Telemann: Fantasies (Centaur)
- VA: Andreas Bach manuscript (Koch Discover Int'l)
- VA: Dublin Virginal Manuscript (Koch Discover Int'l)
- VA: Early English Organ Music (Naxos, 2 volumes)
- VA: Early French Organ Music (Naxos, 2 volumes)
- VA: German Organ Music (Naxos, 2 volumes)
- VA: Das Buxheimer Orgelbuch (Naxos, 3 volumes)
- VA: The Fitzwilliam Virginal Book (Vox (Classical))
- VA: The Queenes Command, music by English virginalists
- VA: Vox Organalis: Gothic Keyboard Music (Koch Discover Int'l)
