= Conrad Paumann =

German organist, lutenist and composer

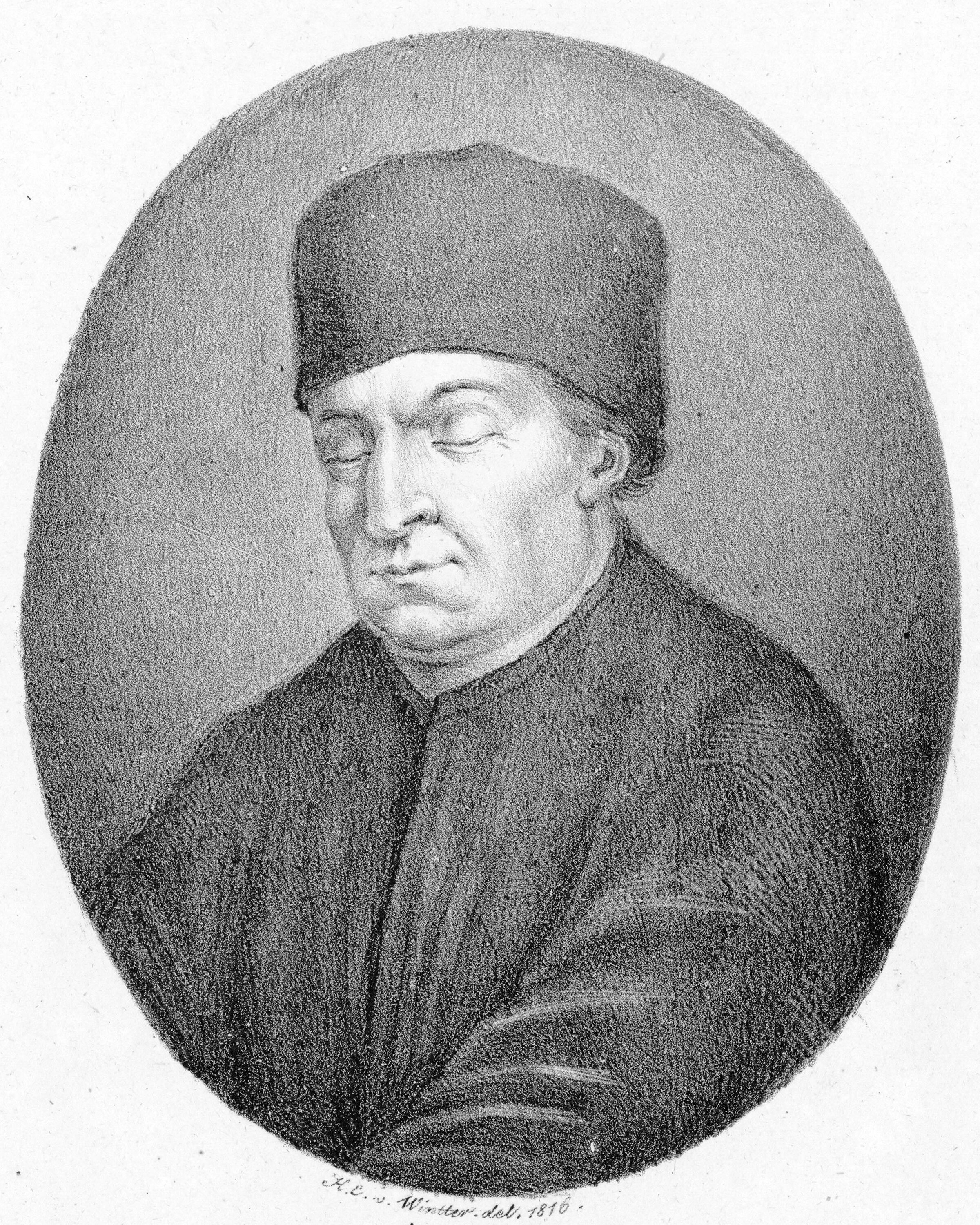
- Paumann (later 19th? century engraving)

Background information
- Born: c. 1410; Nuremberg, Germany
- Died: January 24, 1473 (aged 62–63)
- Genres: Renaissance
- Occupation(s): Instrumentalist, composer
- Instrument(s): Pipe organ, lute

Conrad Paumann (c. 1410 – January 24, 1473) was a German organist, lutenist and composer of the early Renaissance. Born blind, he became one of the most talented musicians of the 15th century, and his performances created a sensation wherever he went. He is grouped among the composers known as the Colorists.

== Life ==
He was born in Nuremberg to a family of craftsmen. His musical ability must have become apparent early, for he received an excellent training with the support of aristocratic patrons. In 1447 he became the official town organist of Nuremberg, and the councilors even issued orders for him not to leave without their permission.

As rebellious as he was talented, Paumann left what was probably a stifling environment, traveling secretly to Munich in 1450 where he was immediately employed by Duke Albrecht III as court organist, who also gave him a house. Munich was officially his home for the remainder of his life, although he began to travel extensively.

While exact records of his travels do not remain, they were clearly extensive, and everywhere he went he was greeted with astonishment; his renown as a performer and composer grew. Milan and Naples both made him attractive job offers. His travels in Italy were probably around 1470, when the Milanese Sforza family was beginning to build their chapel into the most impressive singing and composition establishment in Europe: Josquin des Prez, Loyset Compère, Alexander Agricola and others were all there; some of them may have heard him play, and may have exchanged musical ideas with him. In Mantua he was knighted; in Landshut he performed for the Burgundian duke Philip the Good; in Ratisbon he performed for Emperor Frederick III. During this time he also had numerous students. Unquestionably his influence had much to do with the subsequent development of a culture of organ-playing and composition in Germany, a tradition which culminated in the 18th century with the work of J.S. Bach.

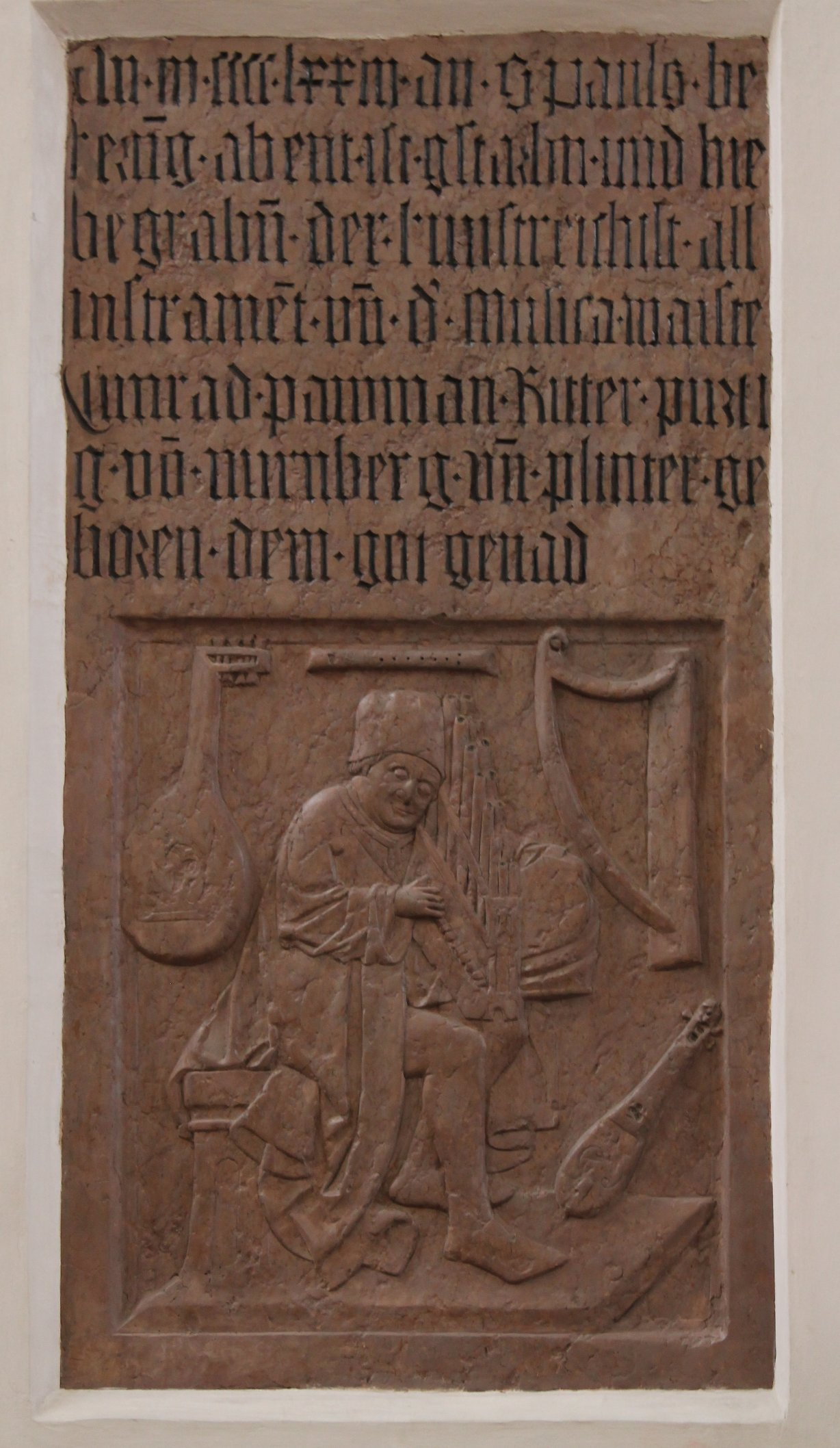
Relief of Paumann with the epitaph

Paumann's epitaph in the Munich Frauenkirche reads:

Anno 1473, on the evening of St. Paul's conversion died and was here buried the most ingenious master of all instruments and music, Cunrad Pauman [sic], knight, born blind at Nuremberg, God have mercy upon him.

Paumann's gift, his disability, his instrument, and his influence are all reminiscent of Francesco Landini, the great Italian composer of a hundred years before.

== Music and influence ==
Paumann, being blind, never wrote down his music, and may have been an improvisor above all. He has been credited with inventing the system of tablature for the lute in Germany; while it cannot be proven, it seems reasonable both because of Paumann's influence, and because of the ease with which music can be dictated using tablature.

Most of his music is instrumental, and some of it considerably virtuosic. Only one vocal composition survives, a tenorlied Wiplich figur for three voices; stylistically it is so close to the contemporary Franco-Flemish idiom that it follows that Paumann knew the music of the Franco-Flemish composers. Most likely he encountered it on his travels, for instance when he went to Milan.

His Fundamentum organisandi of 1452, an instruction manual for improvisation, was combined with the Lochamer-Liederbuch of approximately the same date; the double source is housed in the Berlin Staatsbibliothek.
