= Herr Christ, der einig Gotts Sohn =

Protestant hymn

- Lutheran hymn
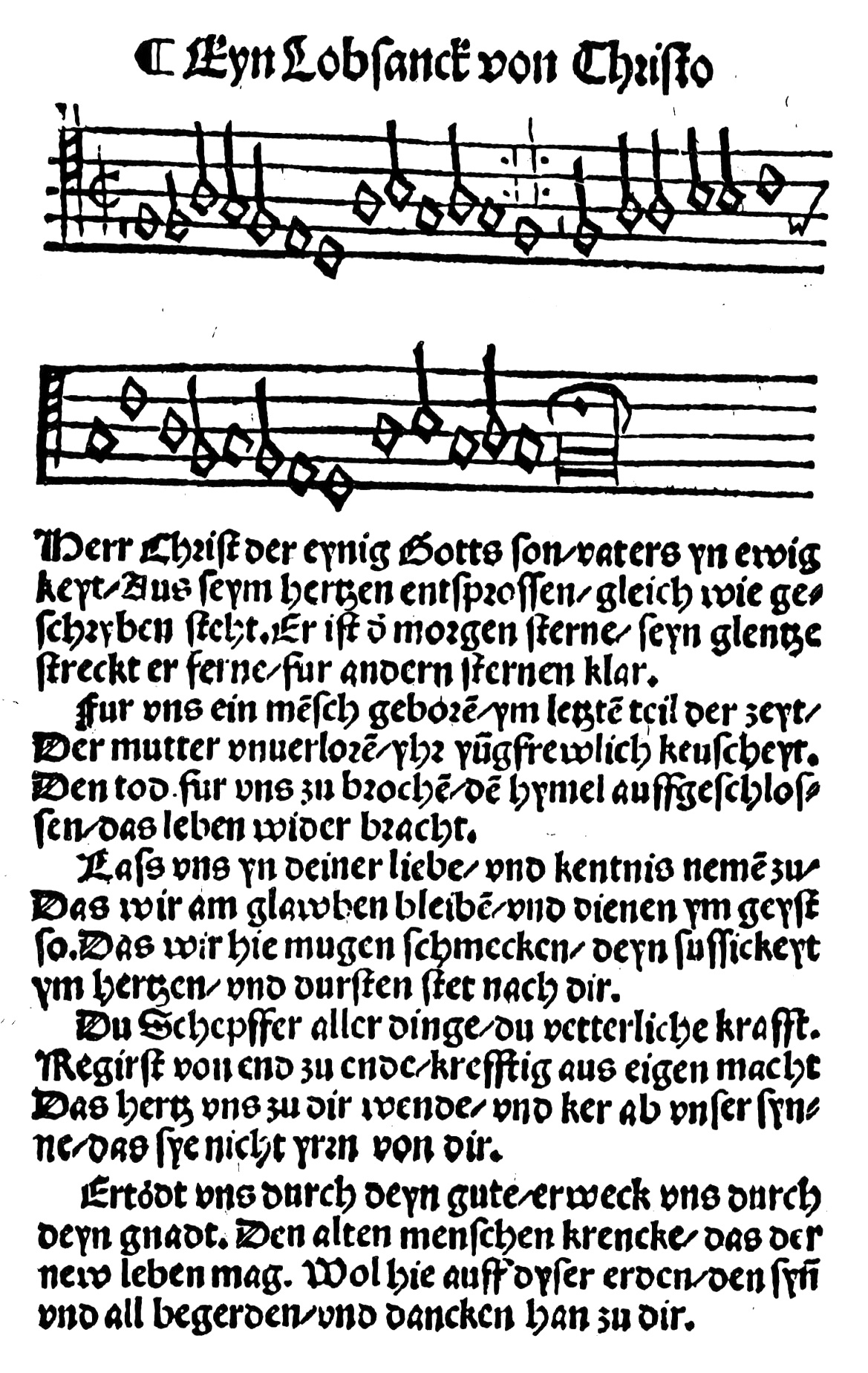
- Print in the Erfurt Enchiridion, 1524
- English: Lord Christ, the only Son of God
- Catalogue: Zahn No. 4297a (tune)
- Text: by Elisabeth Cruciger
- Language: German
- Published: 1524

"Herr Christ, der einig Gotts Sohn" (Lord Christ, the Only Son of God) is a Lutheran hymn by Elisabeth Cruciger. (Note: A variant attribution of the hymn to Andreas Knöpken (e.g. p. 614 in Vopelius' 1682 Neu Leipziger Gesangbuch) was considered entirely disproved by the end of the 19th century.) Printed in 1524 in the Erfurt Enchiridion, together with 18 hymns by Martin Luther, it is one of the oldest Lutheran hymns. The text combines Lutheran teaching with medieval mysticism. It has been the basis of musical settings such as Bach's chorale cantata Herr Christ, der einge Gottessohn, BWV 96.

== History ==
Apart that Elisabeth Cruciger's authorship has been ascertained, little or nothing is known about the genesis of "Herr Christ, der einig Gotts Sohn". The notion that it was modelled after the Christmas hymn "Corde natus ex parentis" ("Of the Father's Heart Begotten"), repeated, for instance, in Bach-scholarship, lost traction in hymnology. The melody of Cruciger's hymn has some similarity with the tune of "Mein Freud möcht sich wohl mehren" ("My Joy Will Increase"), a secular love song known from the Lochamer-Liederbuch (1455).

"Herr Christ, der einig Gotts Sohn" was first published in 1524, both in the Erfurt Enchiridion and in Johann Walter's choral hymnal Eyn geystlich Gesangk Buchleyn in Wittenberg. In the Enchiridion, the hymn appeared with 25 others, 18 by Martin Luther, three by Paul Speratus, one or two by Justus Jonas, one by Erhard Hegenwald, and one attributed to Jan Hus, making this the only hymn in the Enchiridion by a female author.

Titled "Eyn Lobsanck von Christo" (A song of praise of Christ) in the hymnal Enchiridion, the song is a praise of Jesus as the son of God and saviour of man. The hymn text combines Lutheran teaching with medieval mysticism which the author experienced as a nun before she converted. Cruciger writes in the third stanza, for example: "so, daß wir hier mögen schmecken dein Süßigkeit im Herzen und dürsten stets nach dir" (that we may here taste your sweetness in our hearts and constantly thirst for you). It was the first Protestant chorale to use mystical images, imitated in the Jesus mysticism of later generations. Philipp Nicolai referenced the hymn in his own hymn "Wie schön leuchtet der Morgenstern"; both authors use the title "Morgenstern" (morning star) for Jesus.

"Herr Christ, der einig Gotts Sohn" has been associated with Epiphany, the first and second Sundays after Epiphany, Annunciation, the 18th Sunday after Trinity, Advent, and Christmas. The hymn has been included in over 30 hymnals. It appears as No. 67 in Evangelisches Gesangbuch. The hymn tune of "Herr Christ, der einig Gotts Sohn" (Zahn No. 4297a) was later also used for "Herr Gott, nun sei gepreiset", the content of which has no relation to that of Cruciger's hymn. Other hymns sung to the same tune include "Wenn meine Sünd' mich kränken", (Note: The English translation of "Wenn meine Sünd' mich kränken" is "When O'er My Sins I Sorrow," but this translation is sung to "Wenn meine Sünd" instead.) "Dich bitten wir deine Kinder", "O Vater aller Frommen" and "Gib zum Früchten der Erden".

It was translated as early as 1567 as 'Christ is the onlie son of God' in the early Scots hymnbook, The Gude and Godlie Ballatis by the Wedderburn brothers of Dundee.

== Musical settings ==
Hans Leo Hassler composed a four-part setting in 1608, Johann Hermann Schein set the song for two sopranos and basso continuo in 1622, and for four voices and basso continuo in 1627. Samuel Scheidt wrote a four-part setting in Görlitz in 1650.

Johann Sebastian Bach used the hymn as the base for his chorale cantata Herr Christ, der einge Gottessohn, BWV 96 (1724), and used single stanzas in other cantatas. Bach composed an organ prelude, BWV 601, part of his Orgelbüchlein.

Georg Philipp Telemann composed two cantatas, both on a libretto by Erdmann Neumeister, in 1722 and 1758.

Several composers wrote organ preludes, including Dieterich Buxtehude, Johann Hermann Schein and Jan Pieter Sweelinck.

== Sources ==
- Brodersen, Christiane; Brodersen, Kai (2008). Ein Enchiridion oder Handbüchlein geistlicher Gesänge und Psalmen (Erfurt 1524) (in German). Kartoffeldruck-Verlag, Speyer. ISBN 978-3-939526-03-2.
- Browne, Francis; Oron, Aryeh (2008). "Chorale Melodies used in Bach's Vocal Works / Herr Christ, der einge Gottessohn". bach-cantatas.com.
- Browne, Francis; Oron, Aryeh (2009). "Herr Christ, der einge Gottessohn / Text and Translation of Chorale". bach-cantatas.com.
- Reich, Christa (2001). "67 Herr Christ, der einig Gotts Sohn". In Hahn, Gerhard; Henkys, Jürgen (eds.). Liederkunde zum Evangelischen Gesangbuch, Issue 31; Issue 20 (in German). Göttingen: Vandenhoeck & Ruprecht. pp. 48–54. ISBN 3-525-50321-0.
- Schulze, Hans-Joachim (2006). "Foreword". Herr Christ, der einge Gottessohn / Lord Christ, the one begotten son / BWV 96 (PDF). Carus-Verlag. pp. 3–4.
- Terry, Charles Sanford (1921). Bach's Chorals, vol. III. Cambridge University Press.
- Vopelius, Gottfried (1682). Neu Leipziger Gesangbuch (in German). Leipzig: Christoph Klinger.
- Zahn, Johannes (1890). Die Melodien der deutschen evangelischen Kirchenlieder (in German). Vol. III. Gütersloh: Bertelsmann.
- Zersen, David (Fall–Winter 2025). "Elisabeth von Meseritz Cruciger". Lutheran Forum. 58 (2). New Delhi, N.Y.: American Lutheran Publicity Bureau: 23–31.
