= Baroque instruments =

Musical instruments that developed c. 1600 – 1750

The following table lists instruments, classified as brass, woodwinds, strings, keyboard, and basso continuo. Many instruments have an Italian or French name which is used as a common name also in English. The use of instruments by composers is shown in examples mostly by Johann Sebastian Bach.

Baroque Instruments (c. 1600–1750) are Musical instruments used in Baroque music. They were partly used already before, partly are still used today, but with no technology. The movement to perform music in a historically informed way (HIP), trying to recreate the sound of the period, led to the use of historic instruments of the period and to the reconstruction of instruments.

== Table of instruments ==
Common name	Baroque era name		Type	Example of use by Bach	Notes
trumpet(s)	tromba trombe (pl)	it	brass, trumpet	Cantata No. 172	see also Baroque trumpet
tromba da tirarsi	tromba da tirarsi trombe da tirarsi (pl)	it	brass, trumpet		
high trumpet	clarion clarini (pl)	it	brass, trumpet		
trombone(s)	trombone tromboni (pl)	it	brass, trombone		
sackbut	sackbut	it	brass, trombone		
horn(s)	corno corni (pl)	it	brass, horn		
corno da caccia	corno da caccia corni da caccia (pl)	it	brass, horn		
corno da tirarsi	corno da tirarsi corni da tirarsi (pl)	it	brass, horn		
lituus(es)	lituo litui (pl)	it	brass, lituus		
serpent(s)	serpent serpentii (pl)	it	brass		
timpani	timpani	it	percussion	Christmas Oratorio	used with trumpets
recorder(s)	flauto (dolce) flauti (dolci) pl	it	woodwind, recorder	Cantata No. 39	
descant recorder	flauto piccolo flauti piccoli (pl)	it	woodwind, recorder	Cantatas No. 96 and No. 103	
flute(s)	flauto traverso flauti traversi (pl)	it	woodwind, Wooden, Single Key		
clarinet(s)	clarinette clarinetti (pl)	it	woodwind, clarinet		
chalumeau	chalumeau chalumeax (pl)	it	woodwind, clarinet		
oboe(s)	oboe oboi (pl)	it	woodwind, oboe		
oboe(s) d'amore	oboe d'amore oboi d'amore (pl)	it	woodwind, oboe		
tenor oboe	taille(s)	fr	woodwind, oboe		
oboe(s) da caccia	oboe da caccia oboi da caccia (pl)	it	woodwind, oboe		
bassoon(s)	fagotto fagotti (pl)	it	woodwind, bassoon		
contrabassoon(s)	contre-fagotto contre-fagotti (pl)	it	woodwind, bassoon		
violin(s)	violino violini (pl)	it	string, Baroque violin		
violin piccolo	violino piccolo violini piccoli (pl)	it	string, violin	Brandenburg Concerto No. 1	main violin
viola(s)	viola viole (pl)	it	string, viola		
cello (celli)	violoncello violoncelli (pl)	it	string, cello		
violoncello piccolo	violoncello piccolo violoncelli piccoli (pl)	it	string, cello		
viola d'amore	viola d'amore viole d'amore (pl)	it	string, viola		
viola da gamba	viola da gamba viole da gamba (pl)	it	string, viol	St John Passion Aria "Es ist vollbracht!"	Basso continuo, but sometimes solo
violetta	violetta violette (pl)	it	string, viola		
violone	violone violono (pl)	it	string, viol		
organ(s)	organo organi (pl)	it	keyboard, organ		
carillon(s)	carillon	it	key, pitched percussion		
harpsichord(s)	cembalo cembali (pl)	it	keyboard, harpsichord		
lute(s)	liuto liuti (pl)	it	plucked string, lute		
theorbo(es)	chitarone chitaroni (pl)	it	plucked string, lute		
continuo	basso continuo	it	bass group		
clavichord	Manicordo	it	Keyboard, clavichord		

== Baroque instrumentation ==
The typical orchestra of the Baroque period was based on string instruments violin, viola, cello, and continuo. A continuous bass was the rule in Baroque music; its absence is worth mentioning and has a reason, such as describing fragility.

The specific character of a movement is often defined by wind instruments, such as oboe, flauto traverso, recorder, natural trumpet, natural horn, trombone, bassoon, and timpani.

For Bach, some instruments carried symbolic meaning such as a trumpet, the royal instrument of the Baroque, for secular and divine majesty: three trumpets for the Trinity. In arias, Bach often used obbligato instruments, which correspond with the singer as an equal partner. In his early compositions he used instruments that had become old-fashioned, such as viola da gamba and violone.

=== Continuo ===
The basso continuo, or short: continuo, the typical bass group of the period, consisted of a group of instruments, depending upon the other instruments playing and the performance location. The continuous bass is played by a group of instruments that accompany the soloists or melodic voices while playing the bassline and the implied harmonies. A group may consist of cello, double bass (an octave lower) and organ. A bassoon is typically playing when other wind instruments are called for. While an organ will be played in church, a harpsichord will be used in secular surroundings.

=== Brass ===
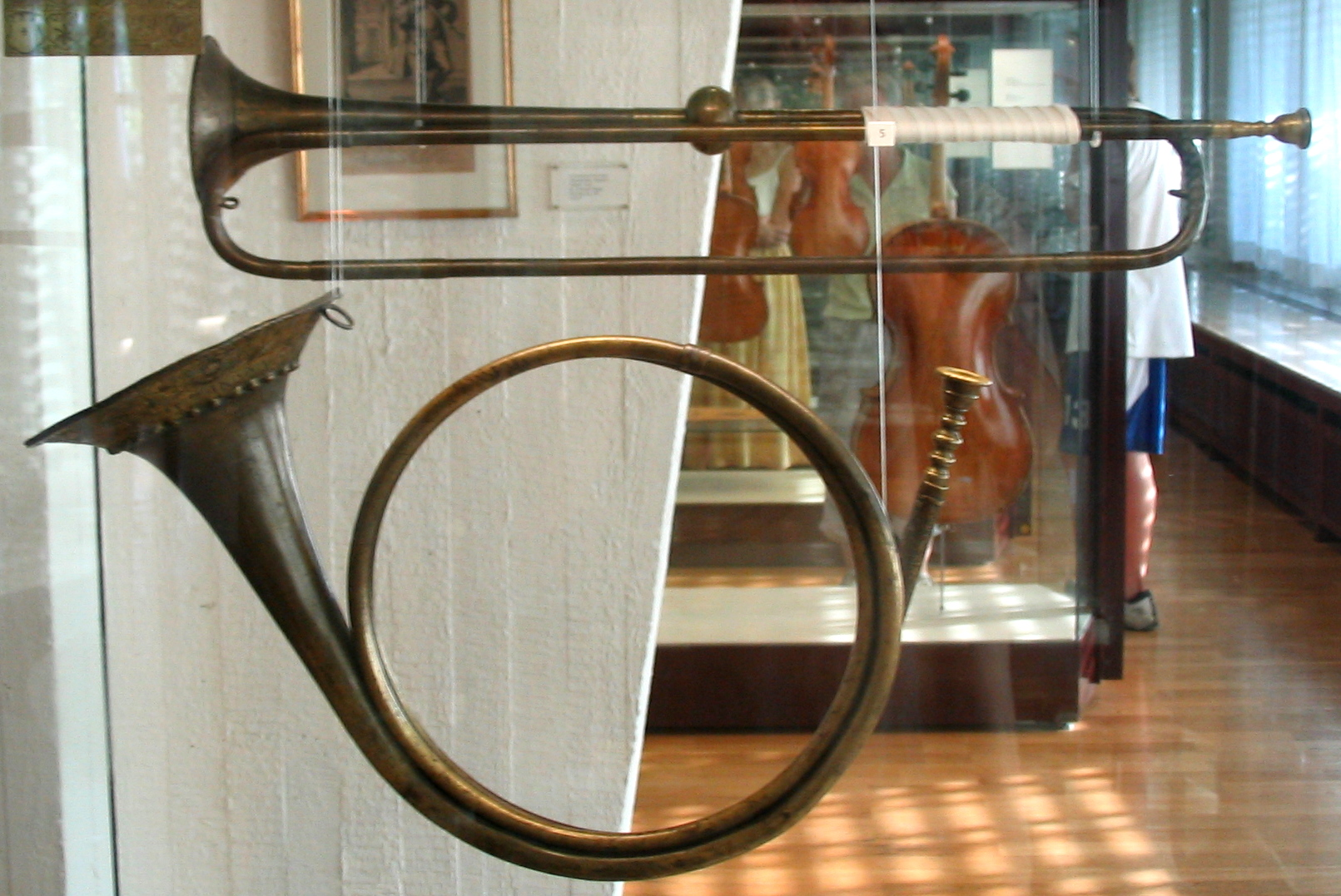
Natural horn & natural Trumpet

The trumpet is the royal instrument of the Baroque, representing secular and divine majesty. Three trumpets symbolize the Trinity in an aria of Bach's BWV 172, addressing the "Heiligste Dreifaltigkeit" (Most holy Trinity), where the bass voice is accompanied only by three trumpets and timpani. Natural horn was also a prominent instrument during the baroque era. Both natural trumpet and natural horn were not originally built with valves (explains the term "natural"). These natural instruments were limited to certain notes, keys, and octaves they could play.

=== Woodwinds ===
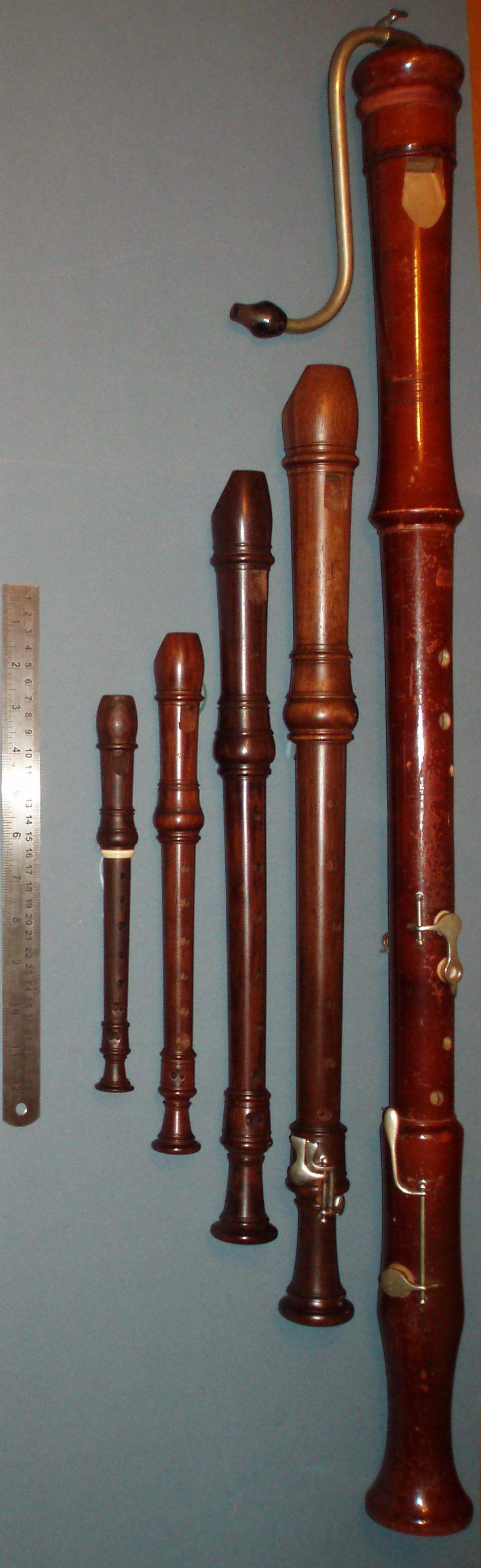
Recorders in different sizes, flauto piccolo (sopranino) on the left

Recorders (flauti dolci) are sometimes used to express humility or poverty, such as in Bach's cantata Brich dem Hungrigen dein Brot, BWV 39.

==== Flauto piccolo ====
Bach used a flauto piccolo (what flauto?), a high recorder in F ("descant recorder" or "sopranino recorder"), to express for example the sparkling of the morning star in Herr Christ, der einge Gottessohn, BWV 96.
