= Lochamer-Liederbuch =

15th century collection of German songs

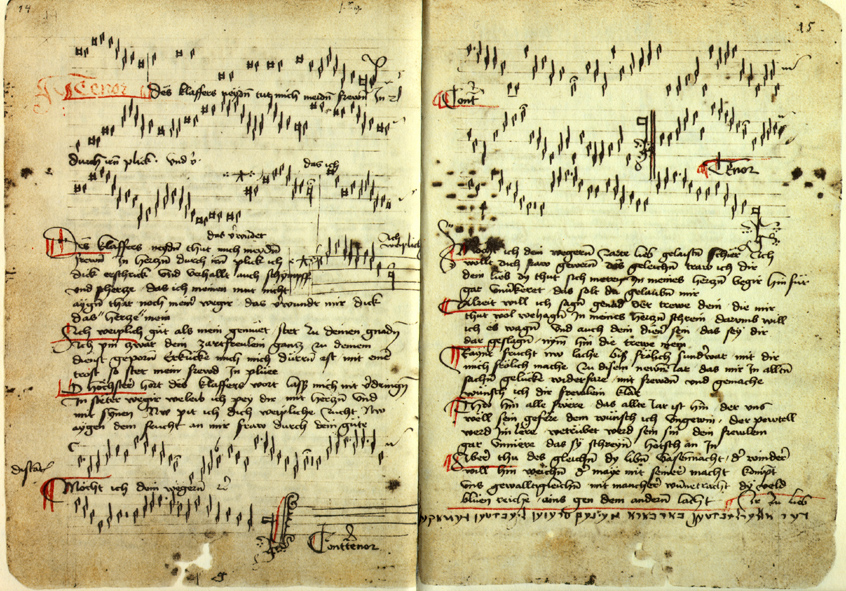
Two pages of the manuscript

The Lochamer-Liederbuch (Lochamer Song Book or Locham Song Book) is an extensive collection of German songs at the transition from the late Middle Ages to the Renaissance. It dates from the mid-15th century and is regarded as one of the most important surviving collections of music from fifteenth-century Germany. Other names are Locheimer and Lochheimer Liederbuch.

== Description ==
The song manuscript comprises 45 songs in one-part to three-part settings on 93 pages. 44 songs are in German, one is Dutch. Other sources arrive at 47 or 50 songs. The differences in numbering come from some songs existing in several versions; some melodies are fragmented or without text or title. For almost half of the songs, the book is the only source.

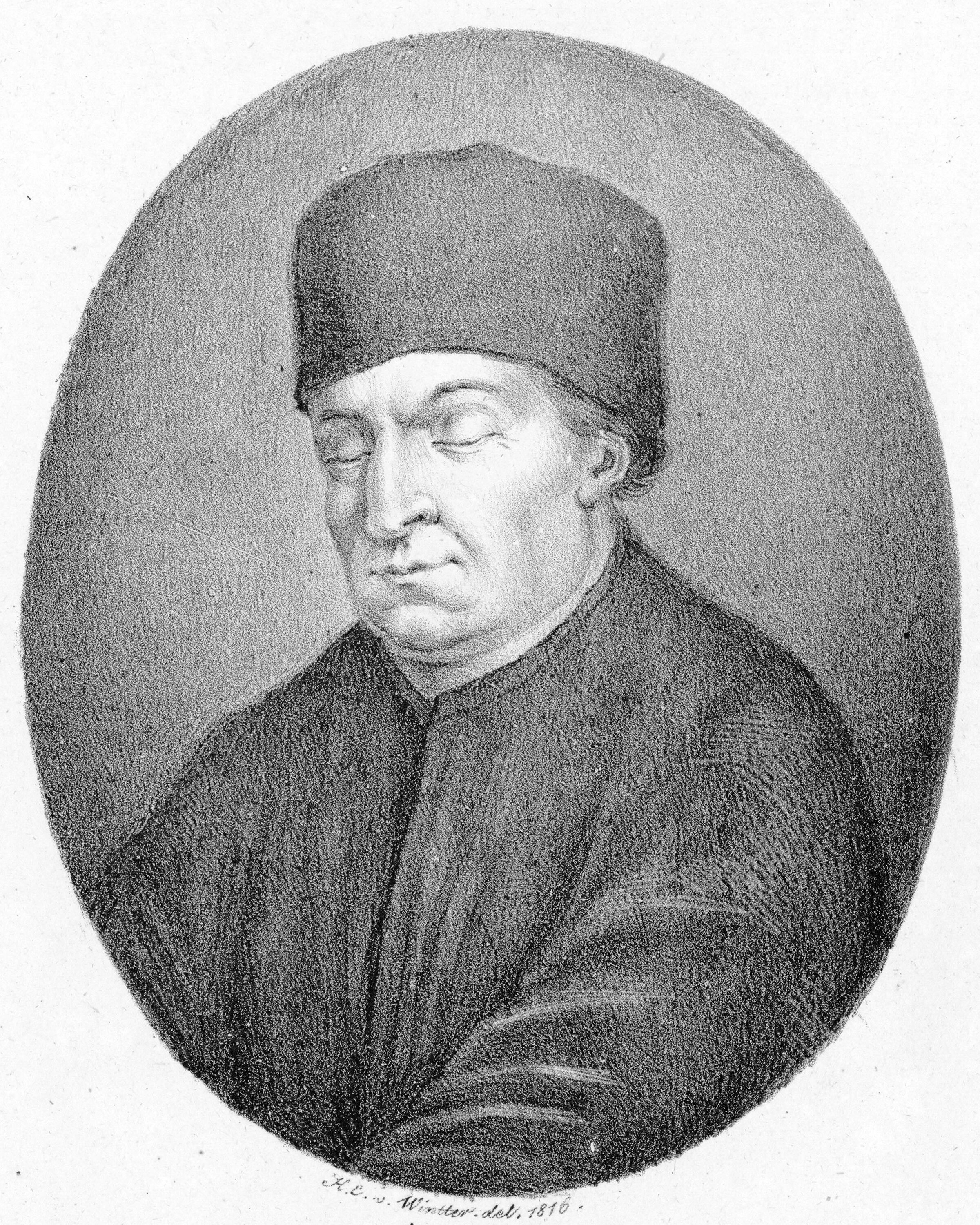
Conrad Paumann

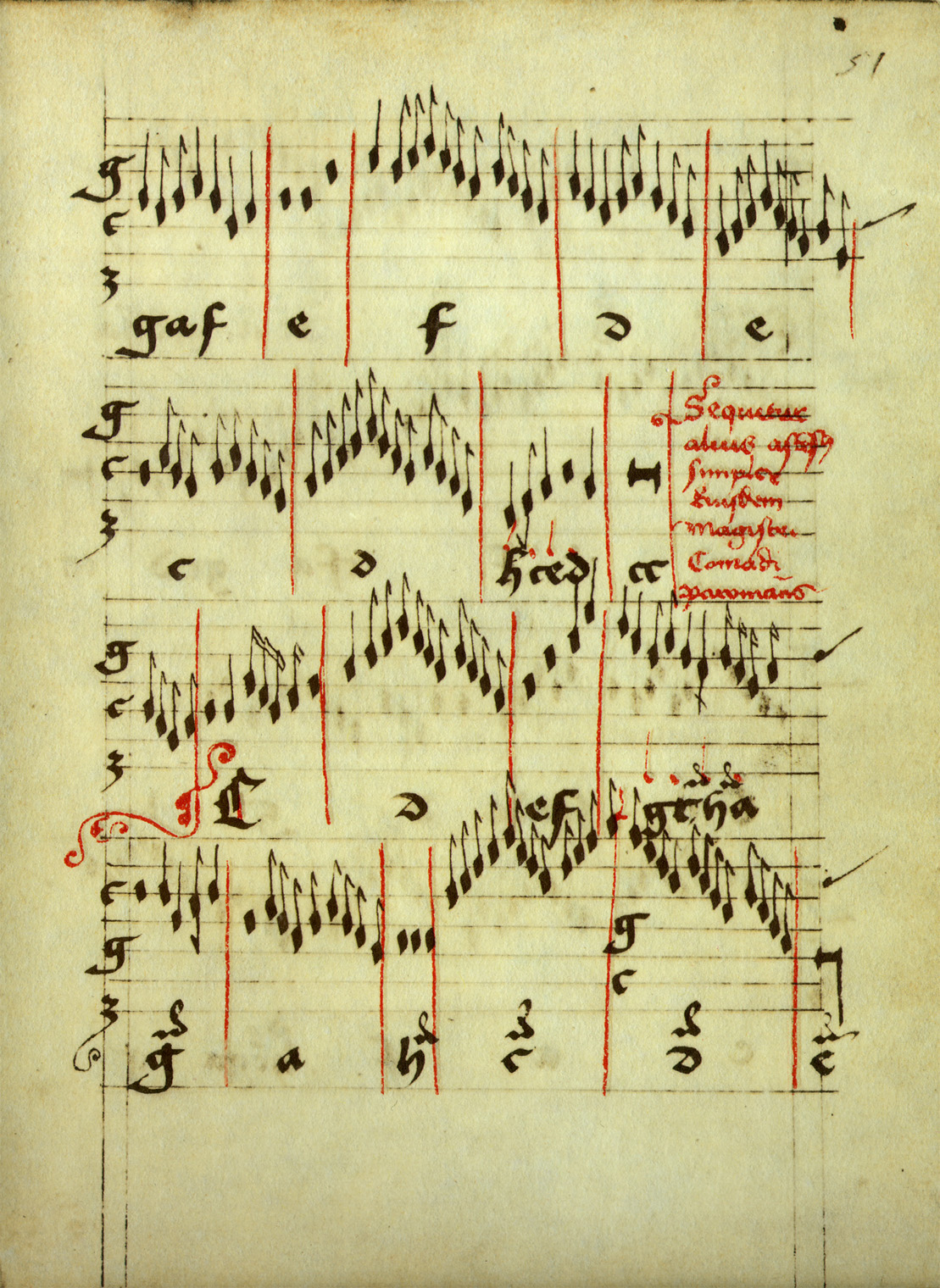
Right page of organ tablature

The main scrivener was some friar Jodocus of Windsheim, who is thought to have been a student of the school of the Nuremberg organist and composer Conrad Paumann. The bulk of the collection dates from the years 1451 to 1453; supplements were added until 1460. The collection shows the increasing value of secular songs, along with sacred ones, including "All mein’ Gedanken, die ich hab" (All my thoughts that I have), "Ich fahr dahin" (I go away), "Der Wald hat sich entlaubet" (The forest is leafless) and "Ich spring an diesem Ringe" (I jump in this circle). Individual songs can be assigned to authors of late medieval manuscripts, namely the Monk of Salzburg and Oswald von Wolkenstein ("Wach auf, mein Hort", Wake up, my darling"). The second part of the manuscript, titled Fundamentum organisandi, includes 31 organ tablatures by Conrad Paumann. The two parts, created independently, were combined soon after their origin.

== Name of the songbook ==
The songbook was named after one of its first owners, who entered his name around 1500 as "Wolflein von Locham[e]r ist das gesenngk büch" (the song book belongs to Wolflein von Lochamr). For a while it was assumed that he was Jewish, because the given name is common among Jews and the book contains writing in Hebrew. The addition of "Lochamer" was then understood as referring to one of several villages called Lochheim. But it is now confirmed that the dedication was written by someone not familiar with Yiddish or Hebrew, and that Wolflein Lochamer was a member of a Christian Nuremberg patrician family.

== Reception ==
In 1811, in a letter to the musicologist Johann Nikolaus Forkel, the antiquarian Christoph Gottlieb von Murr unearthed a remarkable set of fifteenth century manuscripts from Nuremberg with minnelieder or "German minstrel love songs" dating from 1455, 1456, 1452 and 1453: these became the Lochamer-Liederbuch. Despite containing some organ compositions, the main interest has almost always been on the songs.

The song book had changed ownership several times, in 1858 becoming the "Codex Wenigerode" as part of a library. Facsimile copies were made, notably by the philologist Hans Ferdinand Massmann. Baron Joseph von Laßberg, the germanist, got to know about the song book through Massmann. In 1836, during a stay at his castle at Eppishausen in the Swiss alps, von Laßberg encouraged his sister-in-law, the writer and composer Annette von Droste-Hülshoff, to arrange some of the songs for voice and piano, thus creating part of her (unpublished) artistic legacy.

The manuscript of the song book was critically edited by Friedrich Wilhelm Arnold and first published by Friedrich Chrysander in Leipzig in 1867 in his Jahrbuch für musikalische Wissenschaft, Bd. 2 (Yearbook for musical science, vol 2).

The Lochamer-Liederbuch was part of the library of the Prince of Stolberg-Wernigerode in Wernigerode. It was sold in 1931 and is now located in the Berlin State Library. It is regarded as "one of the most important surviving collections of music from fifteenth-century Germany".

Amongst the commentary on the two recent editions from 1972, Konrad Ameln points out that the tune of the troubadour song "Mein freud möcht sich wohl" from the Lochamer-Liederbuch has the same tune as the hymn "Herr Christ, der einig Gotts Sohn" (Zahn 4297a).

== Recordings ==
- 14 Lieder und Instrumentalstücke aus dem Locheimer Liederbuch und dem Fundamentum Organisandi von Conrad Paumann; Hans Sachs: 5 Lieder. Nürnberger Gambencollegium, Josef Ulsamer. Archiv Produktion APM 14822 [LP, mono]. 1964
- Das Lochamer Liederbuch (The Locham Song Book). German Popular Songs from the 15th Century. Martin Hummel (Bariton), Ensemble Dulce Melos, Marc Lewon (Leitung). Naxos 8.557803. 2008

== Modern editions ==
- Ameln, Konrad, ed. (1972). Lochamer-Liederbuch und das Fundamentum organisandi von Conrad Paumann (Faksimile-Nachdruck). Kassel: Bärenreiter. ISBN 3-7618-0406-7.
- Salmen, Walter; Petzsch, Christoph, eds. (1972). Das Lochamer-Liederbuch. Denkmäler der Tonkunst in Bayern. Vol. 2. Wiesbaden: Breitkopf & Härtel.
- Lewon, Marc (ed.). Das Lochamer Liederbuch in neuer Übertragung und mit ausführlichem Kommentar (in German). Reichelsheim: Verlag der Spielleute.
  - Volume 1 (2007) ISBN 978-3-927240-83-4
  - Volume 2 (2008) ISBN 978-3-927240-84-1
  - Volume 3 (2009) ISBN 978-3-927240-85-8
