= Elisabeth Cruciger =

German hymnwriter and poet (c. 1500–1535)

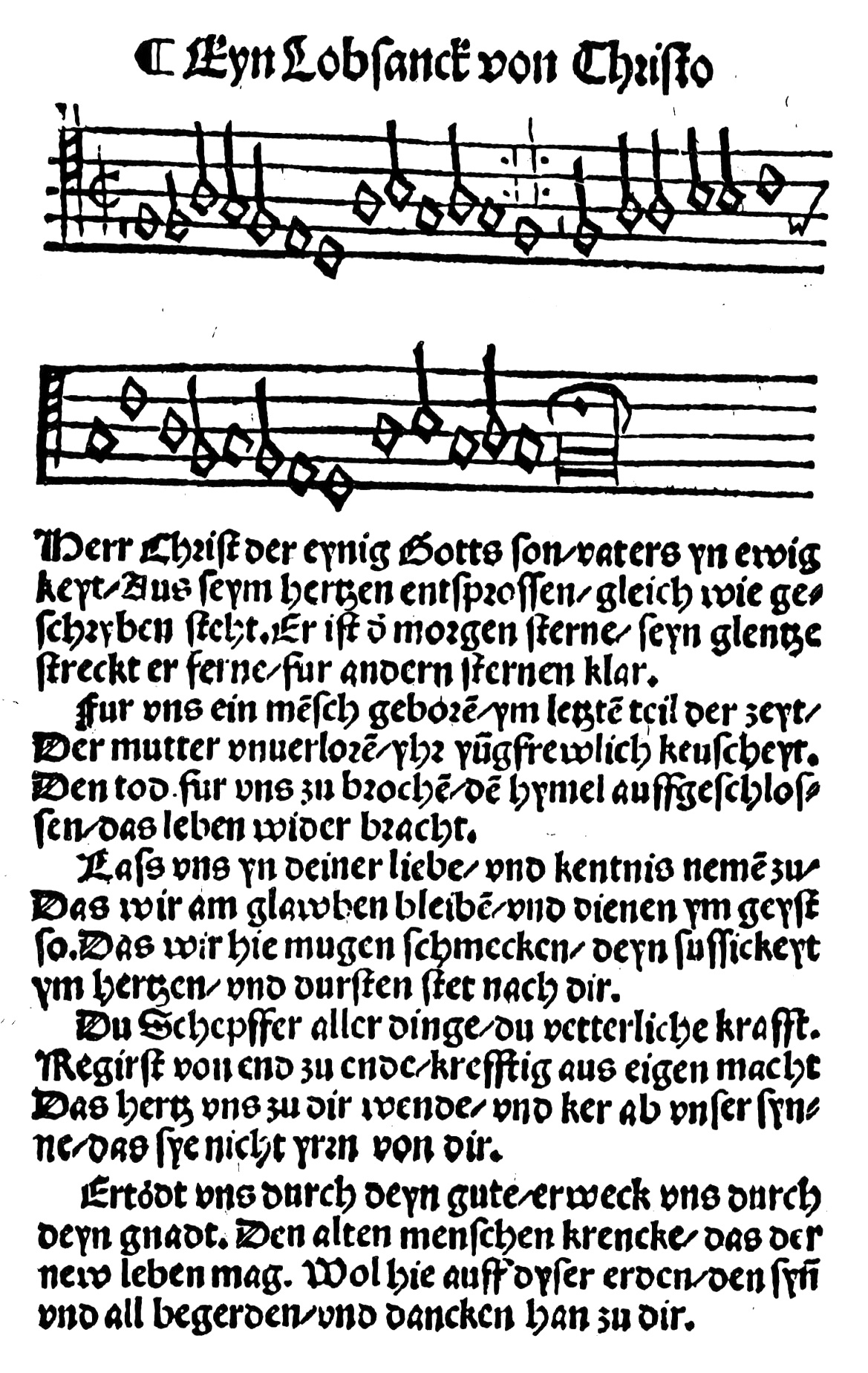
The hymn Herr Christ, der einig Gotts Sohn by Elisabeth Cruciger from Martin Luther's Erfurt Enchiridion, 1524

Elisabeth Cruciger (also spelled Kreuziger, Creutziger etc.; née von Meseritz) (c. 1500 – 2 May 1535), a German writer, was the first female poet and hymnwriter of the Protestant Reformation and a friend of Martin Luther.

== Life ==
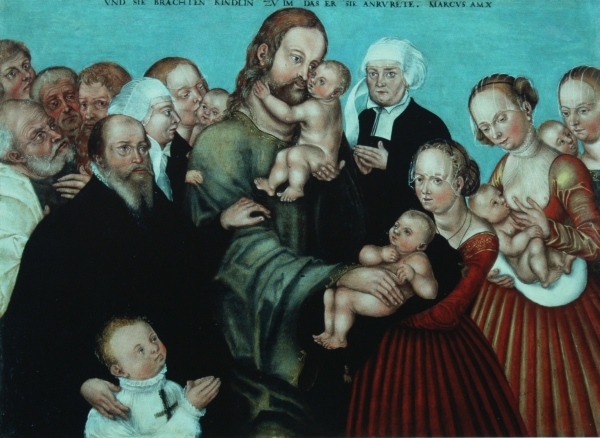
Workshop of Lucas Cranach the younger: Christ blessing the Children, w. Caspar Cruciger in black, next to Elisabeth and second wife Apollonia Günterode in background

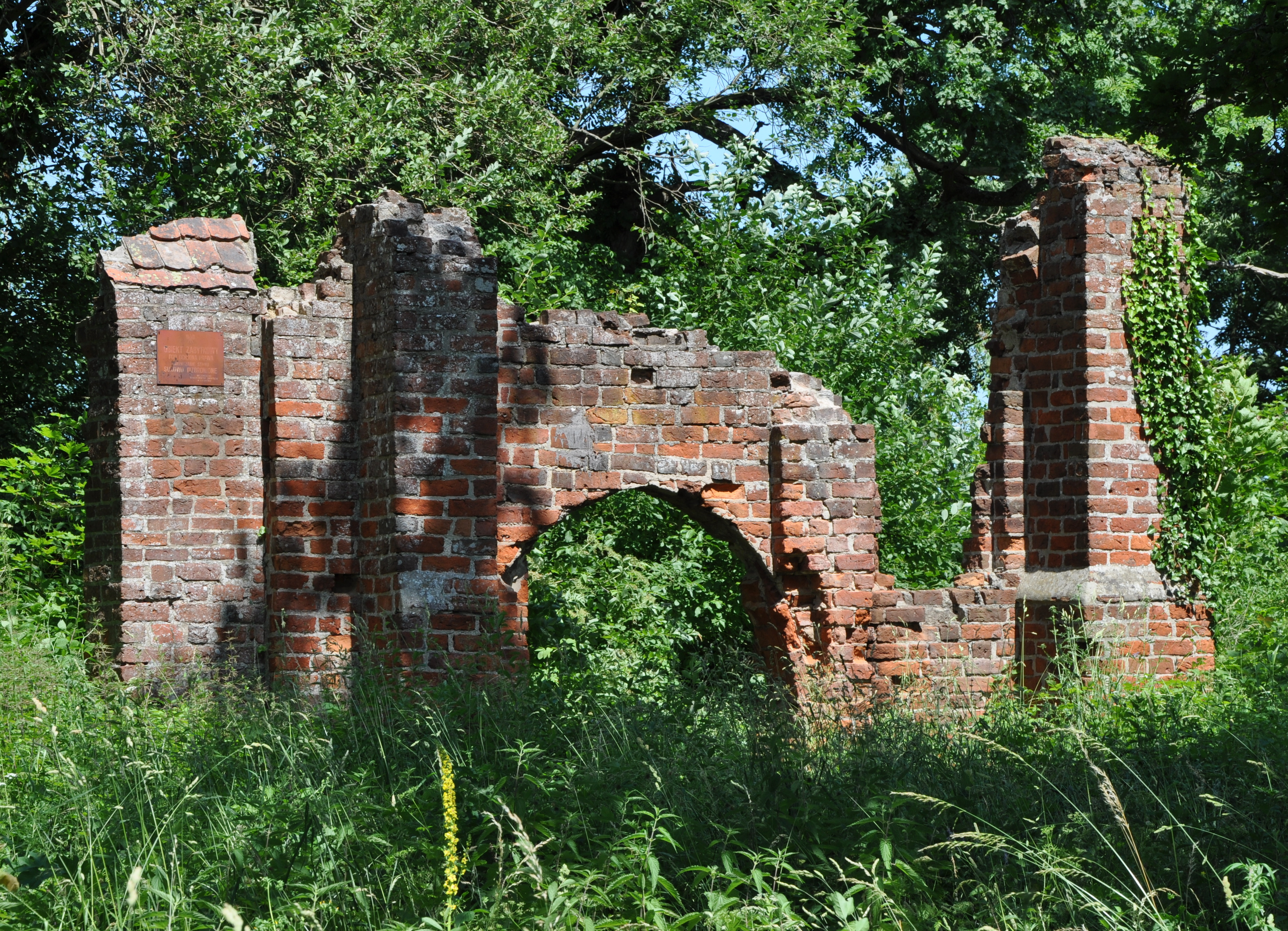
Ruins of Marienbusch Abbey

Elisabeth von Meseritz was born into a noble family in Eastern Pomerania. While still a child, she became a nun at the Marienbusch Abbey, a Premonstratensian cloister in Treptow an der Rega. At the cloisters, she learnt of the religious ideas of the Reformation through Johannes Bugenhagen, one of the influential figures in Lutheranism.

In 1522 Elisabeth left the abbey to move to Wittenberg, where she joined Bugenhagen's household. Then in 1524 she married the theologian Caspar Cruciger, a student and an assistant to Martin Luther. Together they had two children: a daughter, Elisabeth, who married Andreas Kegel, the rector of Luther's hometown Eisleben, and then—on Kegel's death—Luther's son Johannes; and a son, Caspar Cruciger the Younger, who succeeded in Philip Melanchthon's post as professorship at Wittenburg.

Elisabeth Cruciger died in Wittenberg in 1535.

== Veneration ==
In 2022, Elisabeth Cruciger was officially added to the Episcopal Church liturgical calendar with a feast day on 3 May.

== Works ==
- For Epiphany - "Herr Christ, der einig Gotts Sohn" in the current German Protestant hymnal Evangelisches Gesangbuch (EG) Nr. 67 (originally known as Eyn Lobsanck vom Christo, first published in Erfurt 1524 in Eyn Enchiridion oder Handbüchlein, an early Protestant hymnal)

== Further references ==
- (in German) Friedrich Wilhelm Bautz (1975). "Elisabeth Cruciger". In Bautz, Friedrich Wilhelm (ed.). Biographisch-Bibliographisches Kirchenlexikon (BBKL) (in German). Vol. 1. Hamm: Bautz. cols. 1170–1171. ISBN 3-88309-013-1.
- (in German) Carl Bertheau: Kreutziger, Elisabeth. In: Allgemeine Deutsche Biographie (ADB). Vol 17, Duncker & Humblot, Leipzig 1883, p. 148 f.
- (in German) Sonja Domröse: Frauen der Reformationszeit, Gelehrt, mutig und glaubensfest, Vandenhoeck & Ruprecht, Göttingen 2010, ISBN 978-3-525-55012-0
- (in German) Walther Killy: Killy Literaturlexikon. Autoren und Werke deutscher Sprache. Directmedia Publications, Berlin 2000, ISBN 3-89853-109-0. (1 CD-ROM)
- (in German) Elisabeth Schneider-Böklen: Elisabeth Cruciger, die erste Dichterin des Protestantismus. In: Gottesdienst und Kirchenmusik. Heft 2/1994, S. 32 ff.
- (in German) Wolfgang Herbst: Wer ist wer im Gesangbuch? (Onlineleseprobe)
- (In German) Volker Gummelt (2022). "Elisabeth Cruciger, geb.Von Meseritz, in Pommern und Wittenberg: Anmerkung in Stationen ihres Lebens". In Kohnle, Armin und Irene Dingel (eds.). Die Crucigers (Leipzig: Evangelische Verlagsanstalt), 291-302.
