= Wär Gott nicht mit uns diese Zeit, BWV 14 =

Church cantata by Johann Sebastian Bach

Wär Gott nicht mit uns diese Zeit
- BWV 14
- Chorale cantata by J. S. Bach
- Occasion: Fourth Sunday after Epiphany
- Chorale: "Wär Gott nicht mit uns diese Zeit" by Martin Luther
- Performed: 30 January 1735: Leipzig
- Movements: 5
- Vocal: SATB choir; solo soprano, tenor and bass
- Instrumental: corno da caccia; 2 oboes; 2 violins; viola; continuo

Johann Sebastian Bach composed the church cantata Wär Gott nicht mit uns diese Zeit (Were God not with us at this time), BWV 14, in Leipzig in 1735 for the fourth Sunday after Epiphany and first performed it on 30 January 1735, a few weeks after his Christmas Oratorio. The cantata, in Bach's chorale cantata format, is based on Martin Luther's hymn "Wär Gott nicht mit uns diese Zeit". Its text paraphrases Psalm 124, focussing on the thought that the believers' life depends on God's help and is lost without it.

Bach composed the cantata as a late addition to his chorale cantata cycle of 1724/25. In 1725, Easter had been early and therefore no fourth Sunday after Epiphany happened. The text was possibly prepared already at that time. Ten years later, Bach wrote an advanced unusual chorale fantasia as the first section of it, combining elements of a motet with complex counterpoint. The hymn tune is played by instruments, freeing the soprano to interact with the lower voices. In the inner movements, sung by three soloists, Bach depicts in word painting terms such as flood, waves and fury. The closing chorale resembles in complexity the chorales of his Christmas Oratorio.

== History and words ==
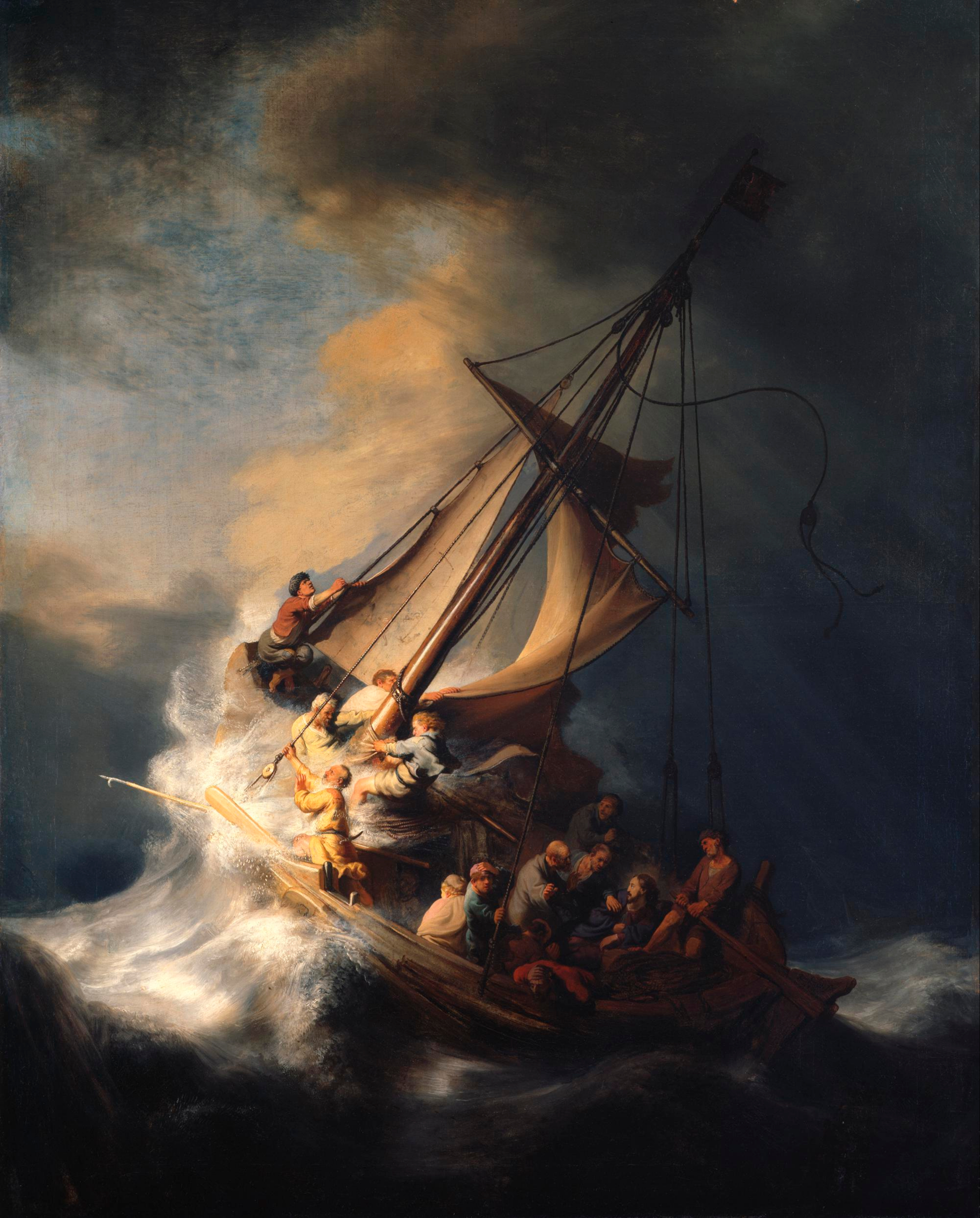
The Storm on the Sea of Galilee by Rembrandt, 1632

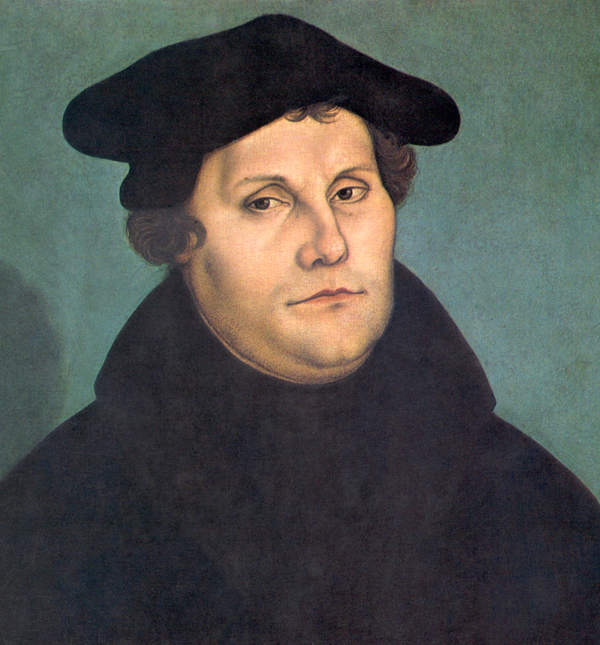
Martin Luther (Cranach the Elder, 1533)

Bach held the position of Thomaskantor (director of church music) in Leipzig from 1723. During his first year, beginning with the first Sunday after Trinity, he had written a first cycle of cantatas for the occasions of the liturgical year. In his second year he composed a second annual cycle of cantatas, which was planned to consist exclusively of chorale cantatas, each based on one Lutheran chorale. As Easter was early in 1725, there was no Fourth Sunday after Epiphany that year. In 1735, shortly after the first performance of his Christmas Oratorio, Bach seems to have desired to fill this void and complete his cycle of chorale cantatas. Bach scholar Christoph Wolff found it evident that Bach reprised the second cycle in 1735, performing the new cantata between Was mein Gott will, das g'scheh allzeit, BWV 111, for the third Sunday after Epiphany and Ich hab in Gottes Herz und Sinn, BWV 92, for Septuagesima.

The prescribed readings for the fourth Sunday after Epiphany were taken from the Epistle to the Romans, "love completes the law" (Romans 13:8–10), and from the Gospel of Matthew, Jesus calming the storm (Matthew 8:23–27). The Neu Leipziger Gesangbuch, which was the standard hymnal in Leipzig since the late 17th century, specifies Luther's "Wär Gott nicht mit uns diese Zeit" as one of five hymns for the occasion. The cantata text is based on this hymn in three stanzas, a paraphrase of Psalm 124, published in Johann Walter's hymnal Eyn geystlich Gesangk Buchleyn of 1524. According to John Eliot Gardiner, this hymn "apparently, had been sung on this Sunday in Leipzig from time immemorial".

In Bach's typical format of the chorale cantata cycle, the text of the outer stanzas is retained unchanged, while an unknown librettist paraphrased the inner stanzas, in this case to three movements, two arias framing a recitative. According to Wolff, the librettist may have been Andreas Stübel, writing previously in 1724/25. The theme of the chorale is connected to the gospel in a general way: the believer's life depends on God's help and is lost without it. A connection is also provided by the image of flooding water that the psalm conveys, which begins "If it had not been the Lord who was on our side" (Psalms 124), and continues "then the waters had overwhelmed us, the stream had gone over our soul, then the proud waters had gone over our soul" (Psalms 124:4–5). The poet paraphrased it in the central recitative to "Es hätt uns ihre Wut wie eine wilde Flut und als beschäumte Wasser überschwemmet" ("Their fury would have, like a raging tide and like a foaming wave, flooded over us").

Bach first performed the cantata on 30 January 1735. It is one of his latest extant church cantatas. The only other extant Bach cantata for the fourth Sunday after Epiphany is his first cycle cantata BWV 81.

== Music ==
=== Scoring and structure ===
Bach structured the cantata in five movements. In the format typical for his chorale cantatas, the first and last movements are set for choir as a chorale fantasia and a closing chorale respectively. They frame a sequence of aria / recitative / aria which the librettist derived from the middle stanza of the hymn. Bach scored the work for three vocal soloists (soprano (S), tenor (T) and bass (B)), a four-part choir, and a Baroque instrumental ensemble: corno da caccia (Co), two oboes (Ob), two violins (Vl), viola (Va), and basso continuo (Bc).

In the following table of the movements, the scoring, keys and time signatures are taken from Alfred Dürr, using the symbol for common time (4/4). The instruments are shown separately for winds and strings, while the continuo, playing throughout, is not shown.

Movements of Wär Gott nicht mit uns diese Zeit, BWV 14
No.	Title	Text	Type	Vocal	Winds	Strings	Key	Time
1	Wär Gott nicht mit uns diese Zeit	Luther	Chorale fantasia	SATB	Co 2Ob	2Vl Va	G minor	3/8
2	Unsre Stärke heißt zu schwach	anon.	Aria	S	Co	2Vl Va	B-flat major	3/4
3	Ja, hätt es Gott nur zugegeben	anon.	Recitative	T				common time
4	Gott, bei deinem starken Schützen	anon.	Aria	B	2Ob		G minor	common time
5	Gott Lob und Dank, der nicht zugab	Luther	Chorale	SATB	Co 2Ob	2Vl Va	G minor	common time

=== Movements ===
==== 1 ====
The opening chorus, "Wär Gott nicht mit uns diese Zeit" (Were God not with us at this time), is a chorale fantasia on the hymn tune. Luther's hymn is sung to the same melody as "Wo Gott der Herr nicht bei uns hält" by Justus Jonas, which Bach had treated to a chorale cantata, Wo Gott der Herr nicht bei uns hält, BWV 178. The opening chorus is an unusual composition that does not follow the scheme of instrumental ritornellos with a cantus firmus, sung line by line by the soprano in long notes. In a setting resembling a motet, the strings play colla parte with the voices, and each line of the chorale is prepared by a complex four-part counter-fugue, in which the first entrance of a theme is answered in its inversion. After preparing entrances, the chorale melody is not sung but played by the horn and the oboes in long notes, creating a five-part composition, which is unique in Bach's cantata movements. The only other piece of similar complexity, also giving the cantus firmus to the instruments, is the opening chorus of Ein feste Burg ist unser Gott, BWV 80, but it is not conceived as a counter-fugue.

==== 2 ====
The first aria, "Uns're Stärke heißt zu schwach" (Our strength itself is too weak), is sung by the soprano, accompanied by the strings and the horn, which illustrates the text's "stark" (strong) and "schwach" (weak) in combination with the voice. Gardiner notes that the horn supports the voice "in its highest register (referred to in the autograph part as Corne. par force and tromba)".

==== 3 ====
The central recitative, "Ja, hätt es Gott nur zugegeben" (Yes, if God had only allowed it), is sung by the tenor as a secco recitative accompanied only by the continuo. The dangers of flooding waters are illustrated in fast passages of the continuo on words such as "Wut" ("fury"), "Flut" ("flood") and "überschwemmet" ("inundate"), making the movement almost an arioso.

==== 4 ====
The bass aria, "Gott, bei deinem starken Schützen sind wir vor den Feinden frei." (God, under Your strong protection we are safe from our enemies.), is accompanied by the two oboes. The middle section shows similar word painting, picturing "Wellen" (waves) in octave leaps and fast downward scales.

==== 5 ====
The closing chorale, "Gott Lob und Dank, der nicht zugab, daß ihr Schlund uns möcht fangen" (Praise and thanks to God, who did not permit that their maw might seize us), is a four-part setting with "contrapuntally animated bass and middle voices", similar to the chorales of the Christmas Oratorio, first performed a few weeks before. Wolff comments on the maturity of Bach's late church cantatas caused by "the experience accumulated by the composer between 1723 and 1729, which lends the later cantatas an especial ripe character".

== Recordings ==
Instrumental groups playing period instruments in historically informed performances are highlighted green under the header "Instr.".

Recordings of Wär Gott nicht mit uns diese Zeit, BWV 14
Title	Conductor / Choir / Orchestra	Soloists	Label	Year	Instr.
J. S. Bach: Das Kantatenwerk • Complete Cantatas • Les Cantates, Folge / Vol. 1	Gustav Leonhardt: Tölzer Knabenchor; King's College Choir; Leonhardt-Consort	soloist of the Tölzer Knabenchor; Marius van Altena; Max van Egmond	Teldec	1972	Period
Die Bach Kantate Vol. 8	Helmuth Rilling Gächinger Kantorei Württembergisches Kammerorchester Heilbronn	Krisztina Laki; Aldo Baldin; Philippe Huttenlocher	Hänssler	1984	
Bach Made in Germany Vol. 4 – Cantatas III	Hans-Joachim Rotzsch Thomanerchor Neues Bachisches Collegium Musicum	Monika Frimmer; Eberhard Büchner; Andreas Scheibner	Eterna	1984	
Bach Cantatas Vol. 19: Greenwich/Romsey	John Eliot Gardiner Monteverdi Choir English Baroque Soloists	Joanne Lunn; Paul Agnew; Peter Harvey	Soli Deo Gloria	2000	Period
Bach Edition Vol. 18 – Cantatas Vol. 9	Pieter Jan Leusink Holland Boys Choir Netherlands Bach Collegium	Ruth Holton; Knut Schoch; Bas Ramselaar	Brilliant Classics	2000	Period
J. S. Bach: Complete Cantatas Vol. 20	Ton Koopman Amsterdam Baroque Orchestra & Choir	Johannette Zomer; James Gilchrist; Klaus Mertens	Antoine Marchand	2002	Period
J. S. Bach: Cantatas Vol. 54 - Ehre sei Gott in der Höhe, Cantatas · 14 · 100 · 197 · 197a (Cantatas from Leipzig 1730s-40s (III))	Masaaki Suzuki Bach Collegium Japan	Hana Blažíková; Gerd Türk; Peter Kooy	BIS	2012	Period
Bach Luther-Kantaten, Vol. 2	Christoph Spering Chorus Musicus Köln Das Neue Orchester	Lydia Teuscher; Daniel Johannsen; Daniel Ochoa	Deutsche Harmonia Mundi	2016	Period

== Bibliography ==
Scores

- Wär Gott nicht mit uns diese Zeit, BWV 14: Scores at the International Music Score Library Project
- "Wär Gott nicht mit uns diese Zeit BWV 14; BC A 40 / Chorale cantata (4th Sunday of Epiphany)". Bach Digital. 2016.

Books

- Bräuer, Siegfried (2003). "297 Wo Gott der Herr nicht bei uns hält". In Hahn, Gerhard; Henkys, Jürgen (eds.). Liederkunde zum Evangelischen Gesangbuch (in German). Vandenhoeck & Ruprecht. pp. 80–83. ISBN 9783525503300.
- Dürr, Alfred; Jones, Richard D. P. (2006). The Cantatas of J. S. Bach: With Their Librettos in German-English Parallel Text. Oxford University Press. ISBN 978-0-19-929776-4.
- Wolff, Christoph (2002). The Learned Musician. W. W. Norton & Company. p. 280. ISBN 978-0-393-32256-9.

Online sources

- Dellal, Pamela (2012). "BWV 14 – Wär Gott nicht mit uns diese Zeit". Emmanuel Music.
- Gardiner, John Eliot (2006). Johann Sebastian Bach (1685-1750) / Cantatas Nos 3, 13, 14, 26, 81 & 155 (Media notes). Soli Deo Gloria (at Hyperion Records website).
- Wolff, Christoph (2006). "The Cantatas of the Picander cycle and of the early 1730s". J. S. Bach: Cantatas Vol. 20 — Ton Koopman (liner notes). Challenge Classics.
- Neuendorf, Christopher J. (2014). "Were God Not with Us at This Time". The Free Lutheran Chorale-Book.
