= Wär Gott nicht mit uns diese Zeit =

1524 hymn by Martin Luther

- Hymn by Martin Luther
- English: Were God not with us at this time
- Catalogue: Zahn 4434–4435
- Text: by Martin Luther
- Language: German
- Based on: Psalm 124
- Published: 1524

"Wär Gott nicht mit uns diese Zeit" (German: [vɛːɐ̯ ˈɡɔt nɪçt ˈmɪt ʔʊns ˈdiːzə ˈtsaɪt]; "Were God not with us at this time") is a Lutheran hymn, with words written by Martin Luther based on the Psalm 124. The hymn in three stanzas of seven lines each was first published in 1524. It was translated to English and has appeared in 20 hymnals. The hymn formed the base of several compositions, including chorale cantatas by Buxtehude and Bach.

== History ==
Luther wrote "Wär Gott nicht mit uns diese Zeit" as a paraphrase of Psalm 124 in three stanzas of seven lines each. It was first printed in 1524 in Johann Walter's Eyn geystlich Gesangk Buchleyn. It was translated to English and has appeared in 20 hymnals.

== Lyrics ==
German

Wär Gott nicht mit uns diese Zeit,
So soll Israel sagen,
Wär Gott nicht mit uns diese Zeit,
Wir hätten mußt verzagen,
Die so ein armes Häuflein sind,
Veracht von so viel Menschenkind,
Die an uns setzen alle.

Auf uns ist so zornig ihrn Sinn,
Wo Gott hätt das zugeben,
Verschlungen hätten sie uns hin
Mit ganzem Leib und Leben,
Wir wärn als die ein Flut ersäuft
Und über die groß Wasser läuft
Und mit Gewalt verschwemmet.

Gott Lob und Dank, der nicht zugab,
Daß ihr Schlund uns möcht fangen.
Wie ein Vogel des Stricks kommt ab,
Ist unser Seel entgangen,
Strick ist entzwei und wir sind frei,
Des Herren Namen steht uns bei,
Des Gotts Himmels und Erden.

English

Were God not with us at this time,
Let Israel now repeat it,
Were God not with us at this time,
We’d surely be defeated;
For we’re a wretched lot, we find,
Held in contempt by all mankind,
Who cruelly do beset us.

So wrathful toward us their intent,
Had God let men o’erpow’r us,
They’d us with gnashing teeth have rent,
With life and limb devoured us;
We would have been as men who drown
When raging waters draw them down
And mighty floods o’erwhelm them.

Thanks be to God, who did not let
Their gaping maw consume us;
As when a bird escapes the net,
Grim death could not entomb us;
The snare is rent, and we are free,
The Lord’s strong name with us shall be,
The God of earth and heaven.

== Melodies and settings ==
When the hymn was first published in 1524 in the Eyn geystlich Gesangk Buchleyn, it was associated with a hymn tune in Doric mode, Zahn No. 4434, which was also used for "Wo Gott der Herr nicht bei uns hält", a paraphrase of the same psalm by Justus Jonas in eight stanzas. Luther had a tendency to retain traditional texts and melodies. In 1537, the hymn was printed again with a different tune by Walter, Zahn No. 4435. The second melody has been regarded as an improvement and became the standard in further publications.

Dieterich Buxtehude set the hymn as a chorale cantata, BuxWV 102, for choir, two violins and continuo. Johann Sebastian Bach composed a chorale cantata, Wär Gott nicht mit uns diese Zeit, BWV 14, in 1725 for the fourth Sunday after Epiphany. In this cantata he uses the Zahn 4434 tune. For "Wär Gott nicht mit uns diese Zeit", BWV 257, one of his four-part chorales, he used the Zahn 4441a melody, one of the hymn tunes composed for "Wo Gott der Herr nicht bei uns hält".

In the Protestant hymnal Evangelisches Gesangbuch, EG 297 combines under the title "Wo Gott der Herr nicht bei uns hält" stanzas from both paraphrases of Psalm 124, taking stanzas 1, 2, 5 and 6 from Jonas (5 from 6, 6 from 8 in the original hymn), and Luther's second and third stanza as stanzas 3 and 4."

== See also ==
- List of hymns by Martin Luther
