= Jesus Christus unser Heiland =

Jesus Christus unser Heiland (English: Jesus Christ our saviour) may refer to:

- "Jesus Christus unser Heiland, der den Tod überwand", a.k.a. "Osterlied", part song (D 987/168A) by Franz Schubert on a text by Friedrich Gottlieb Klopstock
- "Jesus Christus, unser Heiland, der den Tod überwand", Easter hymn by Martin Luther, cited in:
  - BWV 364, chorale harmonization "Jesus Christus, unser Heiland" by Johann Sebastian Bach
  - BWV 626, chorale prelude "Jesus Christus, unser Heiland, der den Tod überwand" in the Orgelbüchlein by Johann Sebastian Bach
  - "Jesus Christus unser Heiland, der den Tod", chorale preludes by Johann Pachelbel
- "Jesus Christus, unser Heiland, der von uns den Gotteszorn wandt", hymn by Martin Luther relating to communion, cited in:
  - BWV 363, chorale harmonization "Jesus Christus, unser Heiland" by Johann Sebastian Bach
  - BWV 665, chorale prelude "Jesus Christus, unser Heiland" in the Great Eighteen Chorale Preludes by Johann Sebastian Bach
  - BWV 666, chorale prelude "Jesus Christus, unser Heiland" in the Great Eighteen Chorale Preludes by Johann Sebastian Bach
  - BWV 688, chorale prelude "Jesus Christus, unser Heiland" in the Clavier-Übung III by Johann Sebastian Bach
  - BWV 689, chorale prelude "Jesus Christus, unser Heiland" in the Clavier-Übung III by Johann Sebastian Bach
  - "Jesus Christus unser Heiland, der von uns", chorale prelude in Erster Theil etlicher Choräle by Johann Pachelbel
- Jesus Christus unser Heiland, chorale fantasia for organ by Heinrich Scheidemann
- Psalmus Sub Comunione: Jesus Christus, Unser Heiland by Samuel Scheidt
