= Psalm 125 =

125th psalm of the book of psalms

- "They that trust in the LORD shall be as mount Zion"
- Song of Ascents
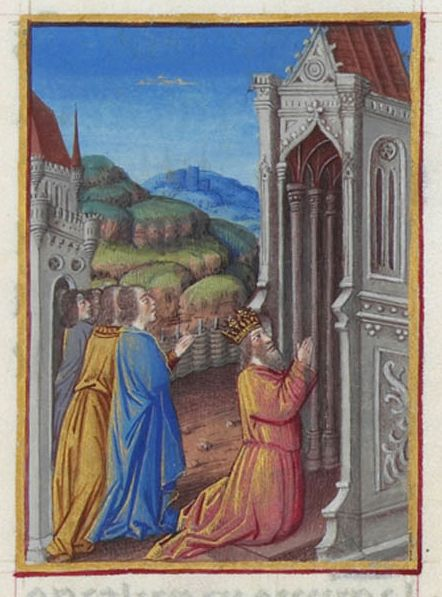
- Illustration for Psalm 125 from Très Riches Heures du Duc de Berry
- Other name: Psalm 124 (Vulgate); "Qui confidunt in Domino"
- Language: Hebrew (original)

Psalm 125
- ← Psalm 124 Psalm 126 →
- Book: Book of Psalms
- Hebrew Bible part: Ketuvim
- Order in the Hebrew part: 1
- Category: Sifrei Emet
- Christian Bible part: Old Testament
- Order in the Christian part: 19

Psalm 125 is the 125th psalm of the Book of Psalms, beginning in English in the King James Version: "They that trust in the LORD shall be as mount Zion". In Latin, it is known by as, "Qui confidunt in Domino". The Book of Psalms is part of the third section of the Hebrew Bible, and a book of the Christian Old Testament. Psalm 125 is one of fifteen psalms that begin with the words "A song of ascents" (Shir Hama'alot).

In the slightly different numbering system used in the Greek Septuagint and the Latin Vulgate, this psalm is Psalm 124.

The psalm forms a regular part of Jewish, Catholic, Lutheran, Anglican and other Protestant liturgies.

== Uses ==
=== Judaism ===
This psalm is recited in some communities following Mincha between Sukkot and Shabbat Hagadol.

=== Catholic Church ===
Around 530, St. Benedict of Nursia used this for the office of Sext from Tuesday until Saturday, after Psalms 123 and 124, according to the Rule of St. Benedict. Today its use is in the Liturgy of the Hours, being recited or sung at vespers on Monday of the third week of the four weekly liturgical cycle.

=== Coptic Orthodox Church ===
In the Agpeya, the Coptic Church's book of hours, this psalm is prayed in the office of Vespers and the second watch of the Midnight office.

== Musical settings ==
Heinrich Schütz composed a setting of a metred paraphrase in German of Psalm 125, "Die nur vertraulich stellen", SWV 230, for the Becker Psalter, published first in 1628.

Verse 2 was adapted into the song Yerushalayim by the Jewish Orthodox Pop group Miami Boys Choir.

== Text ==
The following table shows the Hebrew text of the Psalm with vowels, alongside the Koine Greek text in the Septuagint and the English translation from the King James Version. Note that the meaning can slightly differ between these versions, as the Septuagint and the Masoretic Text come from different textual traditions. (Note: A 1917 translation directly from Hebrew to English by the Jewish Publication Society can be found here or here, and an 1844 translation directly from the Septuagint by L. C. L. Brenton can be found here. Both translations are in the public domain.) In the Septuagint, this psalm is numbered Psalm 124.

#	Hebrew	English	Greek
1	שִׁ֗יר הַֽמַּ֫עֲל֥וֹת הַבֹּטְחִ֥ים בַּיהֹוָ֑ה כְּֽהַר־צִיּ֥וֹן לֹא־יִ֝מּ֗וֹט לְעוֹלָ֥ם יֵשֵֽׁב׃	(A Song of degrees.) They that trust in the LORD shall be as mount Zion, which cannot be removed, but abideth for ever.	᾿ῼδὴ τῶν ἀναβαθμῶν. - ΟΙ ΠΕΠΟΙΘΟΤΕΣ ἐπὶ Κύριον ὡς ὄρος Σιών· οὐ σαλευθήσεται εἰς τὸν αἰῶνα ὁ κατοικῶν ῾Ιερουσαλήμ.
2	יְֽרוּשָׁלַ֗͏ִם הָרִים֮ סָבִ֢יב לָ֥֫הּ וַ֭יהֹוָה סָבִ֣יב לְעַמּ֑וֹ מֵ֝עַתָּ֗ה וְעַד־עוֹלָֽם׃	As the mountains are round about Jerusalem, so the LORD is round about his people from henceforth even for ever.	ὄρη κύκλῳ αὐτῆς, καὶ ὁ Κύριος κύκλῳ τοῦ λαοῦ αὐτοῦ ἀπὸ τοῦ νῦν καὶ ἕως τοῦ αἰῶνος.
3	כִּ֤י לֹ֪א יָנ֡וּחַ שֵׁ֤בֶט הָרֶ֗שַׁע עַל֮ גּוֹרַ֢ל הַֽצַּדִּ֫יקִ֥ים לְמַ֡עַן לֹא־יִשְׁלְח֖וּ הַצַּדִּיקִ֨ים בְּעַוְלָ֬תָה יְדֵיהֶֽם׃	For the rod of the wicked shall not rest upon the lot of the righteous; lest the righteous put forth their hands unto iniquity.	ὅτι οὐκ ἀφήσει Κύριος τὴν ῥάβδον τῶν ἁμαρτωλῶν ἐπὶ τὸν κλῆρον τῶν δικαίων, ὅπως ἂν μὴ ἐκτείνωσιν οἱ δίκαιοι ἐν ἀνομίαις χεῖρας αὐτῶν.
4	הֵיטִ֣יבָה יְ֭הֹוָה לַטּוֹבִ֑ים וְ֝לִישָׁרִ֗ים בְּלִבּוֹתָֽם׃	Do good, O LORD, unto those that be good, and to them that are upright in their hearts.	ἀγάθυνον, Κύριε, τοῖς ἀγαθοῖς καὶ τοῖς εὐθέσι τῇ καρδίᾳ·
5	וְהַמַּטִּ֤ים עֲֽקַלְקַלּוֹתָ֗ם יוֹלִיכֵ֣ם יְ֭הֹוָה אֶת־פֹּעֲלֵ֣י הָאָ֑וֶן שָׁ֝ל֗וֹם עַל־יִשְׂרָאֵֽל׃	As for such as turn aside unto their crooked ways, the LORD shall lead them forth with the workers of iniquity: but peace shall be upon Israel.	τοὺς δὲ ἐκκλίνοντας εἰς τὰς στραγγαλιὰς ἀπάξει Κύριος μετὰ τῶν ἐργαζομένων τὴν ἀνομίαν εἰρήνη ἐπὶ τὸν ᾿Ισραήλ.

=== Verse 5 ===
As for such as turn aside to their crooked ways,
The Lord shall lead them away
With the workers of iniquity.
Peace be upon Israel!

For "crooked ways", the Vulgate has the words in obligationes, translated in the Douay-Rheims 1899 American Edition as "such as turn aside into bonds".

The concluding prayer for peace upon Israel recurs at the end of Psalm 128. It is best taken as a "detached clause", according to the Pulpit Commentary.
