= Jesus Christus, unser Heiland, der den Tod überwand =

Lutheran hymn

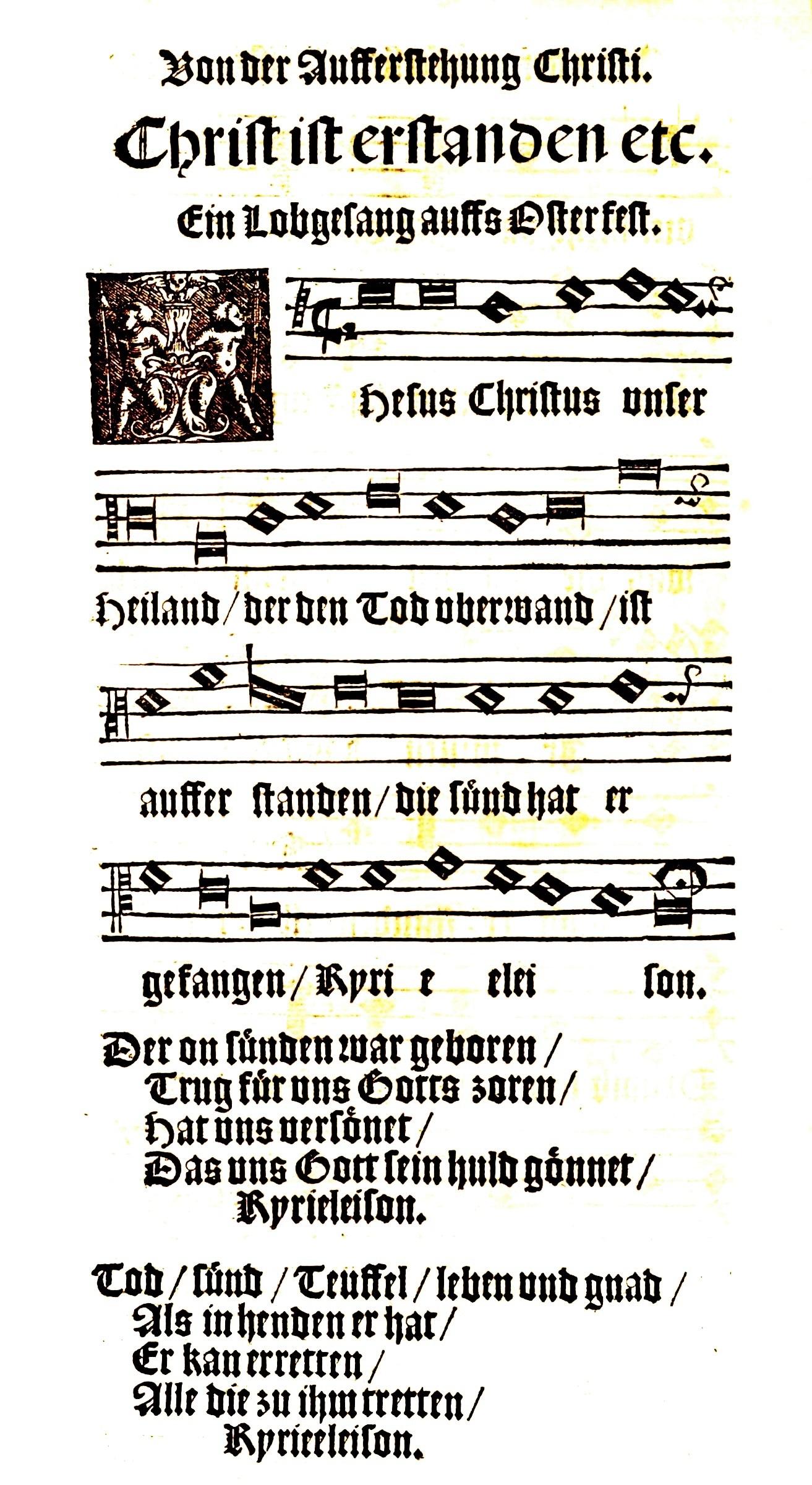
Luther's hymn as published in Magdeburg, 1545 Organ recording

"Jesus Christus, unser Heiland, der den Tod überwand" (English: Jesus Christ, our Saviour, who conquered death) is a hymn for Easter by Martin Luther. The text originated in 1524. Johannes Zahn listed three hymn tunes for it. Two of these, Zahn Nos. 1976 and 1977, were published in 1724. A third, Zahn No. 1978, is attributed to Luther and was first published in 1529. Variants of this melody originated up to the early 17th century.

== Text ==
Below is the original German version of the text

Jesus Christus unser Heiland,
der den Tod überwand,
ist auferstanden,
die Sünd hat er gefangen.
Kyrie eleison.

Der ohn Sünden war geboren,
trug für uns Gottes Zorn,
hat uns versöhnet,
dass Gott uns sein Huld gönnet.
Kyrie eleison.

Tod, Sünd, Leben und auch Gnad,
alls in Händen er hat;
er kann erretten
alle, die zu ihm treten.
Kyrie eleison.

Jesus Christ, our Saviour true,
He who Death overthrew,
Is up arisen,
And sin hath put in prison.
Kyrieleison.

== Settings ==
One of the early melodies for "Jesus Christus, unser Heiland, der den Tod überwand" appeared in the Erfurt Enchiridion. The later hymn tune, Zahn No. 1978, was adopted, for instance, in compositions by Johann Sebastian Bach.

=== Erfurt Enchiridion (1524) ===
The 1524 Erfurt Enchiridion contained the hymn with the Zahn No. 1977 melody:

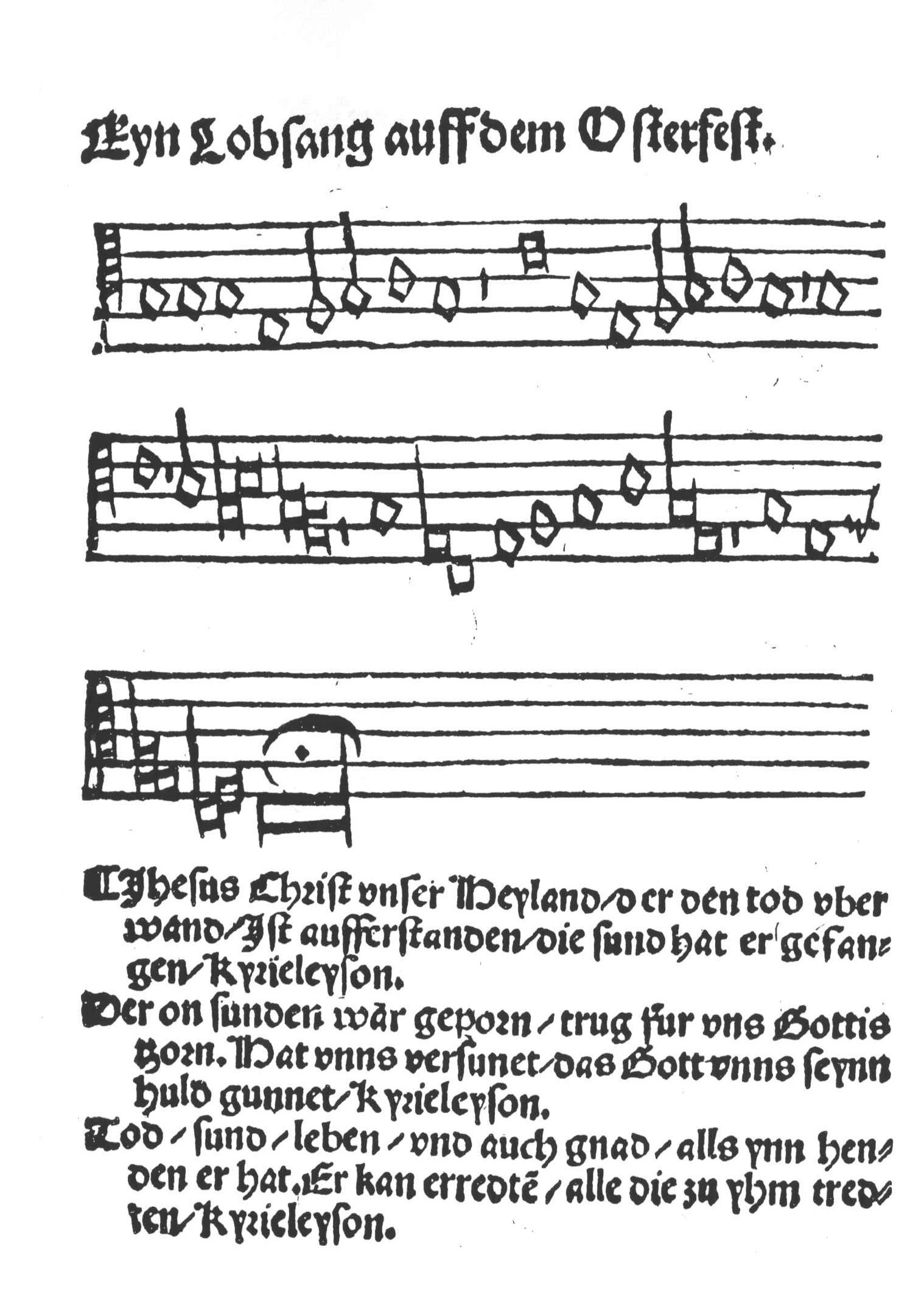

=== Zahn No. 1978 ===
Two four-part settings of the 1529 melody of the hymn were included in Samuel Scheidt's 1650 Görlitzer Tabulaturbuch (SSWV 441-540). Further chorale preludes for organ were composed by Friedrich Wilhelm Zachow (LV 36), by Johann Pachelbel (PC 60) and by Johann Sebastian Bach (BWV 626 in the Orgelbüchlein).

Johann Sebastian Bach also wrote a chorale harmonization (BWV 364):

== See also ==
- List of hymns by Martin Luther

== Sources ==
- Hahn, Gerhard; Henkys, Jürgen, eds. (2001). "102 – Jesus Christus, unser Heiland, der den Tod überwand". Liederkunde zum Evangelischen Gesangbuch Nr. 3. Göttingen: Vandenhoeck & Ruprecht. pp. 56–60. ISBN 3-525-50324-5.
- Lucke, Wilhelm, ed. (1923). "Jesus Christus, unser Heiland, der den Tod überwand". D. Martin Luthers Werke. Kritische Gesamtausgabe. Vol. 35. Weimar: Hermann Böhlaus Nachfolger. pp. 160–161.
- Zahn, Johannes (1889). Die Melodien der deutschen evangelischen Kirchenlieder (in German). Vol. I. Gütersloh: Bertelsmann.
