= Chorale fantasia =

Composition based on a chorale melody

Chorale fantasia is a type of large composition based on a chorale melody, both works for organ, and vocal settings, for example the opening movements of Bach's chorale cantatas, with the chorale melody as a cantus firmus.

== History ==
Chorale fantasias first appeared in the 17th century in the works of North German composers such as Jan Pieterszoon Sweelinck (who arguably had the greatest influence on the genre), Heinrich Scheidemann and Franz Tunder (who, however, rarely used the term). Their works would treat each phrase of a chorale differently, thus becoming large, sectional compositions with elaborate development of the chorale melody. By mid-18th century this type of organ composition was practically non-existent.

Johann Sebastian Bach used the term first to designate a whole variety of different organ chorale types (during his period in Weimar), and then limited its use to large compositions with the chorale melody presented in the bass. Bach also wrote movements which have been described as chorale fantasias scored for various combinations of singers and instruments, for example the opening choruses of his chorale cantatas and the opening and closing movements of Part I of the St Matthew Passion. In the vocal pieces the chorale cantus firmus is often given to the soprano voice.

In the 19th century the chorale fantasia was revived by Max Reger, who applied the term to monumental pieces based on chorale melodies.

== Composers and compositions ==
=== North German tradition ===
- Heinrich Scheidemann:
  - Allein zu dir, Herr Jesu Christ, on the hymn "Allein zu dir, Herr Jesu Christ"
  - Ein feste Burg, on the hymn "Ein feste Burg ist unser Gott"
  - In dich hab ich gehoffet, Herr (I), on the hymn "In dich hab ich gehoffet, Herr"
  - Jesus Christus unser Heiland (I), on the hymn "Jesus Christus unser Heiland"
  - Vater unser (II), on the hymn "Vater unser im Himmelreich"
- Franz Tunder:
  - Auf meinen lieben Gott, on the hymn "Auf meinen lieben Gott"
  - Christ lag in Todesbanden, on the hymn "Christ lag in Todesbanden"
  - Herr Gott, dich loben wir, on the hymn "Herr Gott, dich loben wir"
  - In dich hab ich gehoffet, Herr, on the hymn "In dich hab ich gehoffet, Herr"
  - Komm, Heiliger Geist, Herre Gott, on the hymn "Komm, Heiliger Geist, Herre Gott"
  - Was kann uns kommen an für Not (2 versions)
- Johann Bahr:
  - O lux beata Trinitas (1655), on the hymn "O lux beata Trinitas"
- Johann Adam Reincken:
  - An Wasserflüssen Babylon, on the hymn "An Wasserflüssen Babylon"
  - Was kann uns kommen an für Not
- Dieterich Buxtehude:
  - Gelobet seist du, Jesu Christ, BuxWV 188, on the hymn "Gelobet seist du, Jesu Christ"
  - Ich dank dir, lieber Herre, BuxWV 194, on the hymn "Ich dank dir, lieber Herre"
  - Ich dank dir schon durch deinen Sohn, BuxWV 195, on the hymn "Ich dank dir schon durch deinen Sohn"
  - Ich ruf zu dir, Herr Jesu Christ, BuxWV 196, on the hymn "Ich ruf zu dir, Herr Jesu Christ"
  - Magnificat Primi Toni, BuxWV 203, on the Magnificat
  - Magnificat Primi Toni, BuxWV 204, on the Magnificat
  - Nun freut euch, lieben Christen g'mein, BuxWV 210, on the hymn "Nun freut euch, lieben Christen g'mein"
  - Nun lob, mein Seel, den Herren, BuxWV 212, on the hymn "Nun lob, mein Seel, den Herren"
  - Te Deum laudamus, BuxWV 218, on the Te Deum
  - Wie schön leuchtet der Morgenstern, BuxWV 223, on the hymn "Wie schön leuchtet der Morgenstern"
- Nicolaus Bruhns:
  - Nun komm, der Heiden Heiland, on the hymn "Nun komm, der Heiden Heiland"
- Vincent Lübeck:
  - Ich ruf zu dir, Herr Jesu Christ, on the hymn "Ich ruf zu dir, Herr Jesu Christ"
  - Nun lasst uns Gott, den Herrn, on the hymn "Nun laßt uns Gott dem Herren"

=== Later examples ===
- Johann Sebastian Bach:
  - vocal
    - Opening movements of his chorale cantatas
    - St Matthew Passion: the opening and concluding movements of Part I, "Kommt, ihr Töchter, helft mir klagen" (based on "O Lamm Gottes, unschuldig") and "O Mensch, bewein dein Sünde groß"
    - Du wahrer Gott und Davids Sohn, BWV 23, movement 4
  - As of 2008, when the former BWV Anh. II 71 was authenticated as a composition by Bach, there are two known chorale fantasias for organ by the composer:
    - Christ lag in Todesbanden, BWV 718, on the hymn "Christ lag in Todesbanden" (Zahn 7012a melody)
    - Wo Gott der Herr nicht bei uns hält, BWV 1128 (formerly BWV Anh. 71), on the hymn "Wo Gott der Herr nicht bei uns hält"
- Max Reger:
  - Ein' feste Burg ist unser Gott, Op. 27 (1898)
  - Freu' dich sehr, o meine Seele (1898)
  - Zwei Choralphantasien, Op. 40 (1899):
    - Wie schön leucht't uns der Morgenstern on the hymn by Philipp Nicolai
    - Straf' mich nicht in deinem Zorn! on the hymn by Johann Georg Albinus
  - Drei Choralphantasien, Op. 52 (1900):
    - "Alle Menschen müssen sterben" (1900)
    - "Wachet auf, ruft uns die Stimme" on the hymn by Philipp Nicolai
    - "Hallejula! Gott zu loben, bleibe meine Seelenfreud"
- Hubert Parry:
  - Three Chorale Fantasias, published in 1915.

== Sources ==
- Blaut, Stephan; Schulze, Hans-Joachim (2008). ""Wo Gott der Herr nicht bei uns hält" BWV 1128 – Quellenkundliche und stilistische Überlegungen" [Wo Gott der Herr nicht bei uns hält, BWV 1128: source-related and stylistic considerations]. In Wollny, Peter (ed.). Bach-Jahrbuch 2008 [Bach Yearbook 2008]. Bach-Jahrbuch (in German). Vol. 94. Neue Bachgesellschaft. Leipzig: Evangelische Verlagsanstalt. pp. 11–32. doi:10.13141/bjb.v2008. ISBN 978-3-374-02668-5. ISSN 0084-7682 – via Qucosa.
- Dürr, Alfred; Kobayashi, Yoshitake, eds. (1998). Bach Werke Verzeichnis: Kleine Ausgabe – Nach der von Wolfgang Schmieder vorgelegten 2. Ausgabe [Bach Works Catalogue: Small Edition – After Wolfgang Schmieder's 2nd edition] (in German). Kirsten Beißwenger (collaborator). (BWV^{2a} ed.). Wiesbaden: Breitkopf & Härtel. ISBN 978-3-7651-0249-3. Preface in English and German.
