= Wo Gott der Herr nicht bei uns hält =

1524 Lutheran hymn

- Lutheran hymn
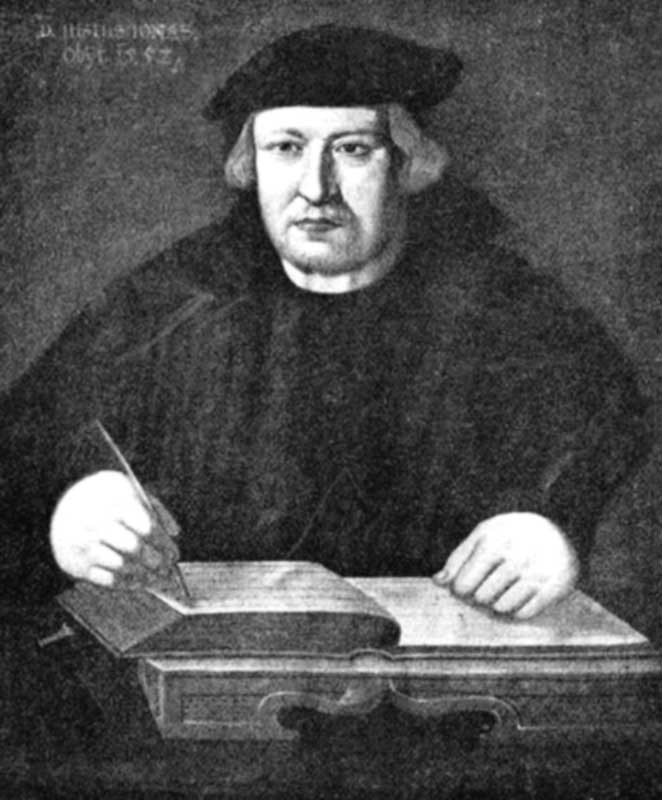
- Lutheran reformer Justus Jonas, the author of the hymn
- English: Where God the Lord stands with us not
- Catalogue: Zahn 4440–4441a, 4442–4443
- Genre: Hymn
- Text: by Justus Jonas
- Language: German
- Published: 1524

"Wo Gott der Herr nicht bei uns hält" (English: Where God the Lord stands with us not, original: Wo Gott der Herr nicht bey uns helt) is a Lutheran hymn by Justus Jonas, a paraphrase of Psalm 124 in eight stanzas. It was first published in 1524 in the Erfurt Enchiridion. The theme of the psalm is the need for help against raging enemies. It has also been translated as "Where the Lord God does not stand (stay) with us", "If God the Lord is not with us", "If God the Lord is not on our side", among others.

== History ==
Jonas wrote the hymn at the request of Martin Luther in 1524. He combined the ideas of Psalm 124 with passages from Psalm 12 and other Biblical motifs. The text was first published in the Erfurt Enchiridion, a hymnal of 26 songs including 18 by Luther, "Es ist das Heil uns kommen her" and other hymns by Paul Speratus, "Herr Christ, der einig Gotts Sohn" by Elisabeth Cruciger, and others.

Luther himself published his own paraphrase of Psalm 124 in three stanzas, "Wär Gott nicht mit uns diese Zeit". The current German Protestant hymnal Evangelisches Gesangbuch has as EG 297 a combination of Jonas' stanzas 1, 2, 5, and 6, and Luther's 2 and 3 (as 3 and 4).

== Music ==
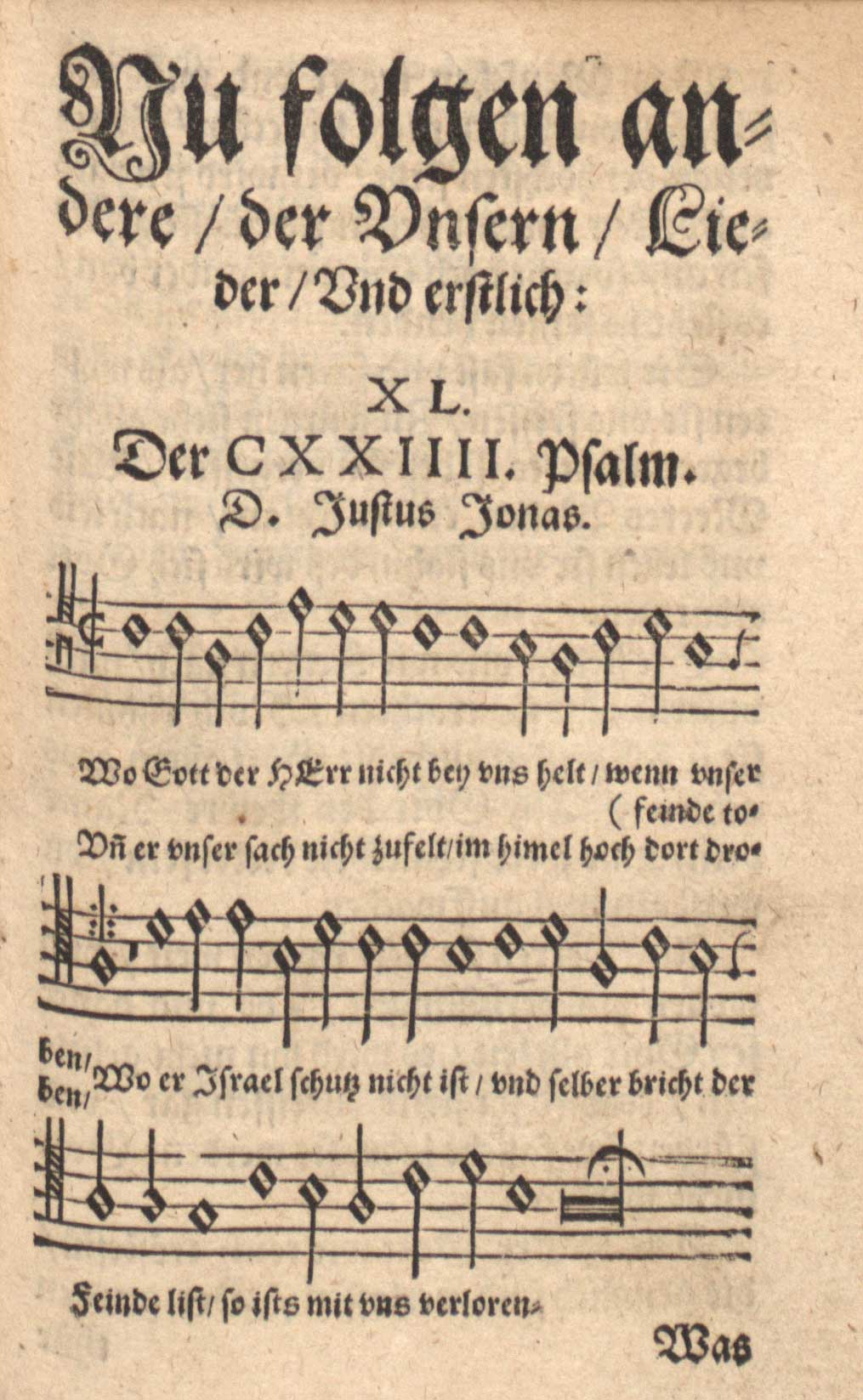
Hymnal with Jonas's hymn (Zahn 4441 melody)

A hymn tune for Jonas's hymn was published in 1525 in Zwickau (Zahn No. 4440). Joseph Klug published two melodies for the hymn in the 1535 edition of his hymnal: Zahn Nos. 4441a and 4442. Another hymn tune, Zahn No. 4443, was published in Leipzig, in Ernst Vögelin's Geystliche Lieder of 1563.

The hymn is the base for several compositions. An early four-part setting was written by Johann Walter. Johann Sebastian Bach composed a chorale cantata, BWV 178, based on Jonas's hymn and the Zahn 4441a tune, the eighth cantata of his second annual cycle, first performed on 30 July 1724. He also wrote a chorale fantasia, BWV 1128, believed to date from between 1705 and 1710, which was discovered in 2008. Chorale preludes were written by Johann Christoph Bach and Johann Pachelbel, vocal works were composed by Michael Altenburg, Christoph Graupner, Johann Hermann Schein and Heinrich Schütz, among others.
