= Ullrich Böhme =

Ullrich Böhme is a German organist. He was the organist of the Thomaskirche in Leipzig from 1985 to 2021.

Böhme grew up in Rothenkirchen, Vogtland. Starting at the age of 13, he became an organist at church services there. From 1972 to 1979, he studied at the Church Music School in Dresden with Hans Otto and at the Felix Mendelssohn Bartholdy Academy of Music in Leipzig with Wolfgang Schetelich.

After completing his studies, he worked as cantor and organist at the Kreuzkirche in Karl-Marx-Stadt (now Chemnitz) until 1986. In 1985, Böhme was chosen from among many applicants to become Leipzig's St. Thomas Organist, taking up the position in 1986. His responsibilities include playing the organ at church services and in the motets of the St. Thomas Boys' Choir, as well as playing basso continuo for cantatas, oratorios, and Passions. As organist of St. Thomas Church, he initiated the restoration of the romantic Sauer organ there and designed the concept for a new Baroque Bach organ, which was built in 2000 by the organ building company Woehl.

In 1994, Böhme was appointed honorary professor of organ at the Institute of Church Music at the Leipzig University of Music and Theatre. He also gives interpretation courses at home and abroad.

On 13 June 2008, Böhme played BWV 1128 at the opening concert of the Bachfest Leipzig, which included Bach's cantata BWV 178 on the same chorale, sung by the Thomanerchor.

After almost 36 years of service as St. Thomas organist, Ullrich Böhme retired in November 2021 while serving in the motet of the St. Thomas Boys Choir at St. Thomas Church in Leipzig.
