= Psalm 123 =

123rd psalm of the book of psalms

- Unto thee lift I up mine eyes
- Song of Ascents
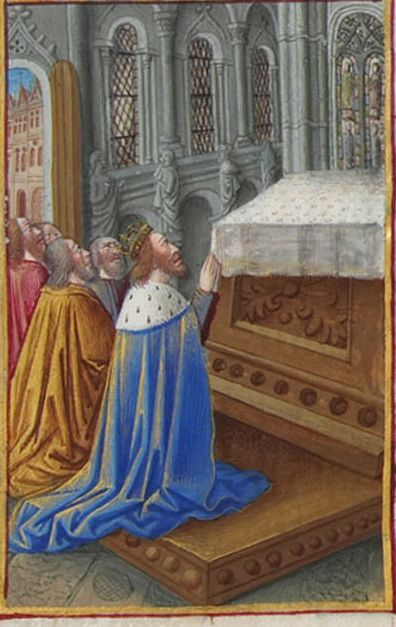
- Miniature psaume 123, The Redeemer of Israel in the Très Riches Heures du Duc de Berry, David praying before an altar surrounded by four figures symbolising people in danger
- Other name: Psalm 122 (Vulgate); Ad te levavi oculos meos
- Language: Hebrew (original)

Psalm 123
- ← Psalm 122 Psalm 124 →
- Book: Book of Psalms
- Hebrew Bible part: Ketuvim
- Order in the Hebrew part: 1
- Category: Sifrei Emet
- Christian Bible part: Old Testament
- Order in the Christian part: 19

Psalm 123 is the 123rd psalm of the Book of Psalms, beginning in English in the King James Version: "Unto thee lift I up mine eyes, O thou that dwellest in the heavens". The Book of Psalms is part of the third section of the Hebrew Bible, and a book of the Christian Old Testament. This short psalm is one of fifteen psalms that begin with the words "A song of ascents" (Shir Hama'a lot). In Latin, it is known as "Ad te levavi oculos meos", and Baptist writer Charles Spurgeon calls it "the Psalm of the eyes".

In the slightly different numbering system used in the Greek Septuagint and the Latin Vulgate, this psalm is Psalm 122.

It forms a regular part of Jewish, Catholic, Lutheran, Anglican and other Protestant liturgies.

== Uses ==
=== Judaism ===
- Is recited in some communities following Mincha between Sukkot and Shabbat Hagadol.
- Verse 3 is part of the final paragraph of Tachanun.

=== Catholic Church ===
Since the Middle Ages, this psalm was traditionally performed during the office of Sext week, namely from Tuesday until Saturday, according to the Rule of St. Benedict set in 530 AD.

In the Liturgy of Hours today, Psalm 123 is recited or sung at Vespers on the Monday of the third week of the four weekly liturgical cycle, as the psalm that follows. In the liturgy of the Mass, it is read on the third Sunday in Ordinary Time of the year.

=== Coptic Orthodox Church ===
Traditionally, Psalm 123 is to be recited, privately to oneself, when a deacon sets foot from the nave, where hymns are sung, to the altar, where the Holy Eucharist is consecrated and kept. However, this stems from Apostolic Tradition, hence the deacon is not bound by any law to do this, but is left to his own volition.

In the Agpeya, the Coptic Church's book of hours, this psalm is prayed in the office of Vespers and the second watch of the Midnight office.

== Rhyming ==
Spurgeon points out that Psalm 123 is a rare case of a psalm that rhymes in Hebrew, although he notes Samuel Cox's comment that the rhymes are "purely accidental".

== Musical settings ==
Heinrich Schütz composed a metred paraphrase of Psalm 123 in German, "Wohl dem, der in Gottesfurcht steht", SWV 228, for the Becker Psalter, published first in 1628.

== Text ==
The following table shows the Hebrew text of the Psalm with vowels, alongside the Koine Greek text in the Septuagint and the English translation from the King James Version. Note that the meaning can slightly differ between these versions, as the Septuagint and the Masoretic Text come from different textual traditions. (Note: A 1917 translation directly from Hebrew to English by the Jewish Publication Society can be found here or here, and an 1844 translation directly from the Septuagint by L. C. L. Brenton can be found here. Both translations are in the public domain.) In the Septuagint, this psalm is numbered Psalm 122.

#	Hebrew	English	Greek
1	שִׁ֗יר הַֽמַּ֫עֲל֥וֹת אֵ֭לֶיךָ נָשָׂ֣אתִי אֶת־עֵינַ֑י הַ֝יֹּשְׁבִ֗י בַּשָּׁמָֽיִם׃	(A Song of degrees.) Unto thee lift I up mine eyes, O thou that dwellest in the heavens.	᾿ῼδὴ τῶν ἀναβαθμῶν. - ΠΡΟΣ σὲ ἦρα τοὺς ὀφθαλμούς μου τὸν κατοικοῦντα ἐν τῷ οὐρανῷ.
2	הִנֵּ֨ה כְעֵינֵ֪י עֲבָדִ֡ים אֶל־יַ֤ד אֲֽדוֹנֵיהֶ֗ם כְּעֵינֵ֣י שִׁפְחָה֮ אֶל־יַ֢ד גְּבִ֫רְתָּ֥הּ כֵּ֣ן עֵ֭ינֵינוּ אֶל־יְהֹוָ֣ה אֱלֹהֵ֑ינוּ עַ֝֗ד שֶׁיְּחׇנֵּֽ נוּ׃	Behold, as the eyes of servants look unto the hand of their masters, and as the eyes of a maiden unto the hand of her mistress; so our eyes wait upon the LORD our God, until that He have mercy upon us.	ἰδοὺ ὡς ὀφθαλμοὶ δούλων εἰς χεῖρας τῶν κυρίων αὐτῶν, ὡς ὀφθαλμοὶ παιδίσκης εἰς χεῖρας τῆς κυρίας αὐτῆς, οὕτως οἱ ὀφθαλμοὶ ἡμῶν πρὸς Κύριον τὸν Θεὸν ἡμῶν, ἕως οὗ οἰκτειρῆσαι ἡμᾶς.
3	חׇנֵּ֣נוּ יְהֹוָ֣ה חׇנֵּ֑נוּ כִּי־רַ֝֗ב שָׂבַ֥עְנוּ בֽוּז׃	Have mercy upon us, O LORD, have mercy upon us: for we are exceedingly filled with contempt.	ἐλέησον ἡμᾶς, Κύριε, ἐλέησον ἡμᾶς, ὅτι ἐπὶ πολὺ ἐπλήσθημεν ἐξουδενώσεως,
4	רַבַּת֮ שָֽׂבְעָה־לָּ֢הּ נַ֫פְשֵׁ֥נוּ הַלַּ֥עַג הַשַּֽׁאֲנַנִּ֑ים הַ֝בּ֗וּז (לגאיונים) [לִגְאֵ֥י יוֹנִֽים]׃	Our soul is exceedingly filled with the scorning of those that are at ease, and with the contempt of the proud.	ἐπὶ πλεῖον ἐπλήσθη ἡ ψυχὴ ἡμῶν. Τὸ ὄνειδος τοῖς εὐθηνοῦσι, καὶ ἡ ἐξουδένωσις τοῖς ὑπερηφάνοις.
