= Psalm 124 =

124th psalm of the book of psalms

- "If it had not been the LORD who was on our side"
- Song of Ascents
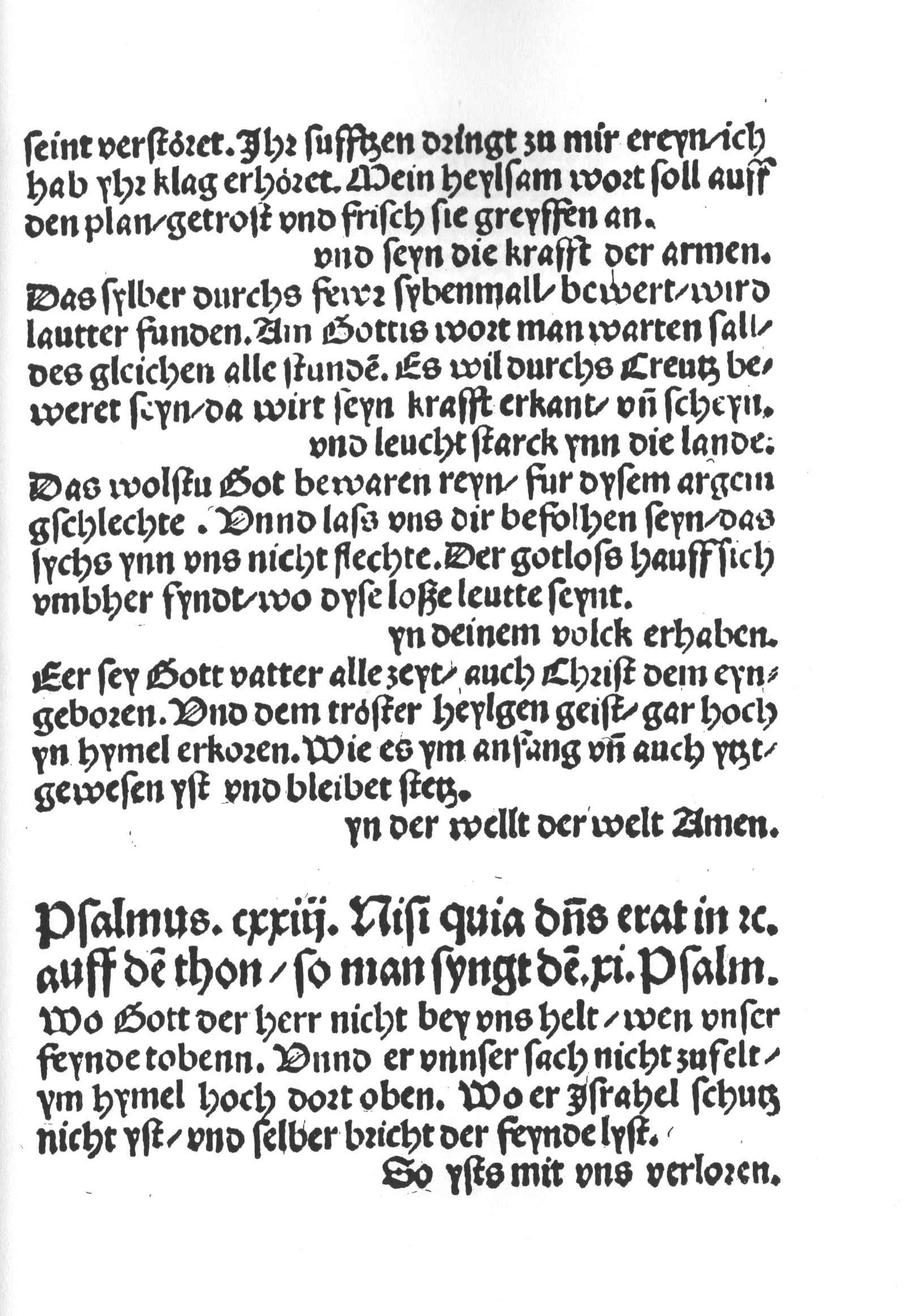
- Psalm 124 in the Erfurt Enchiridion
- Other name: Psalm 123 (Vulgate); Nisi quia Dominus
- Related: "Wo Gott der Herr nicht bei uns hält"; "Wär Gott nicht mit uns diese Zeit"
- Language: Hebrew (original)

Psalm 124
- ← Psalm 123 Psalm 125 →
- Book: Book of Psalms
- Hebrew Bible part: Ketuvim
- Order in the Hebrew part: 1
- Category: Sifrei Emet
- Christian Bible part: Old Testament
- Order in the Christian part: 19

Psalm 124 is the 124th psalm of the Book of Psalms, beginning in the English of the King James Version: "If it had not been the LORD who was on our side, now may Israel say". The Book of Psalms is part of the third section of the Hebrew Bible, and a book of the Christian Old Testament. In the slightly different numbering system used in the Greek Septuagint and the Latin Vulgate, this psalm is Psalm 123. In Latin it is known as "Nisi quia Dominus". It is one of fifteen psalms that begin with the words "A song of ascents" (Shir Hama'alot). Using "conventional metaphors", it recalls the dangers faced by Israel from which the nation has been rescued.

The psalm forms a regular part of Jewish, Catholic, Lutheran and Anglican liturgies as well as Protestant psalmody. Marc-Antoine Charpentier set the psalm in the 1690s as Nisi quia Dominus erat, H. 217, for soloists, chorus and continuo, and it was paraphrased in two psalm songs by Protestant Reformers which were set as chorale cantatas by Johann Sebastian Bach.

== Uses ==
=== Judaism ===
The psalm is recited in some communities following Mincha between Sukkot and Shabbat Hagadol.

=== Catholic Church ===
According to the Rule of St Benedict around 530 AD, this psalm was traditionally performed for the office of sext from Tuesday to Saturday. In the Liturgy of the Hours, Psalm 124 is currently recited at the Vespers of the Monday of the third week.

It also is the source of the ubiquitous versicle ℣: Our help is in the name of the Lord ℟: who created Heaven and Earth, especially used for introductions of any sort, which is the psalm's verse 8.

=== Eastern Orthodox Church ===
In the Eastern Orthodox Church, Psalm 123 (Psalm 124 in the Masoretic Text) is part of the eighteenth Kathisma division of the Psalter, read at Vespers on Friday evenings. During Lent, it is read every weekday evening at Vespers and at the Divine Liturgy of the Presanctified Gifts.

This Psalm is the basis of the Second Antiphon of the Anabathmoi sung at Matins on Sundays of Tones 2 and 6.

=== Coptic Orthodox Church ===
In the Agpeya, the Coptic Church's book of hours, this psalm is prayed in the office of Vespers and the second watch of the Midnight office.

=== Lutheranism ===
In 1524, the psalm was paraphrased in German by the Protestant reformers Justus Jonas and Martin Luther. Jonas wrote "Wo Gott der Herr nicht bei uns hält", Luther "Wär Gott nicht mit uns diese Zeit".

=== Reformed Christianity ===
The 1650 Scottish Psalter offers two separate versions of this psalm in metrical form. The first which opens "Had not the Lord been on our side" is set in the common metre while the second version, "Now Israel may say, and that truly" is in 10, 10, 10, 10, 10 metre.

== Musical settings ==
Two hymns in German were derived from Psalm 124 as metred paraphrases, Martin Luther's "Wär Gott nicht mit uns diese Zeit" and "Wo Gott der Herr nicht bei uns hält" by Justus Jonas, both in 1524.

In 1694, Michel-Richard de Lalande composed a motet with regard to Psalm 124 (S. 42), for the services of Louis XIV, in the royal chapel of the Chateau of Versailles. Marc-Antoine Charpentier set in 1690s one "Nisi quia Dominus erat in nobis" H.217, for soloists, chorus and continuo.

Heinrich Schütz composed a setting of the hymn "Wär Gott nicht mit uns diese Zeit", SWV 229, for the Becker Psalter, published first in 1628.

Johann Sebastian Bach created chorale cantatas from the two paraphrases of the psalm by reformers, Wo Gott der Herr nicht bei uns hält, BWV 178, first performed on 30 July 1724, and Wär Gott nicht mit uns diese Zeit, BWV 14, first performed on 30 January 1735. Many composers wrote chorale preludes for the two hymns.

A setting of the psalm is part of the album Ascents, a collection of setting of Psalms 120-131 written and performed by Dennis Culp in the 1990s, and released in 2000. Psalm 124 is titled "My Help". A setting of the psalm is part of the album Fractures, a collection of psalms settings (16, 60, 68, 134, 34 and 124) by Sons of Korah, and released in 2017. The concluding Psalm 124 is titled "Out of the Snare".

== Inscriptions ==
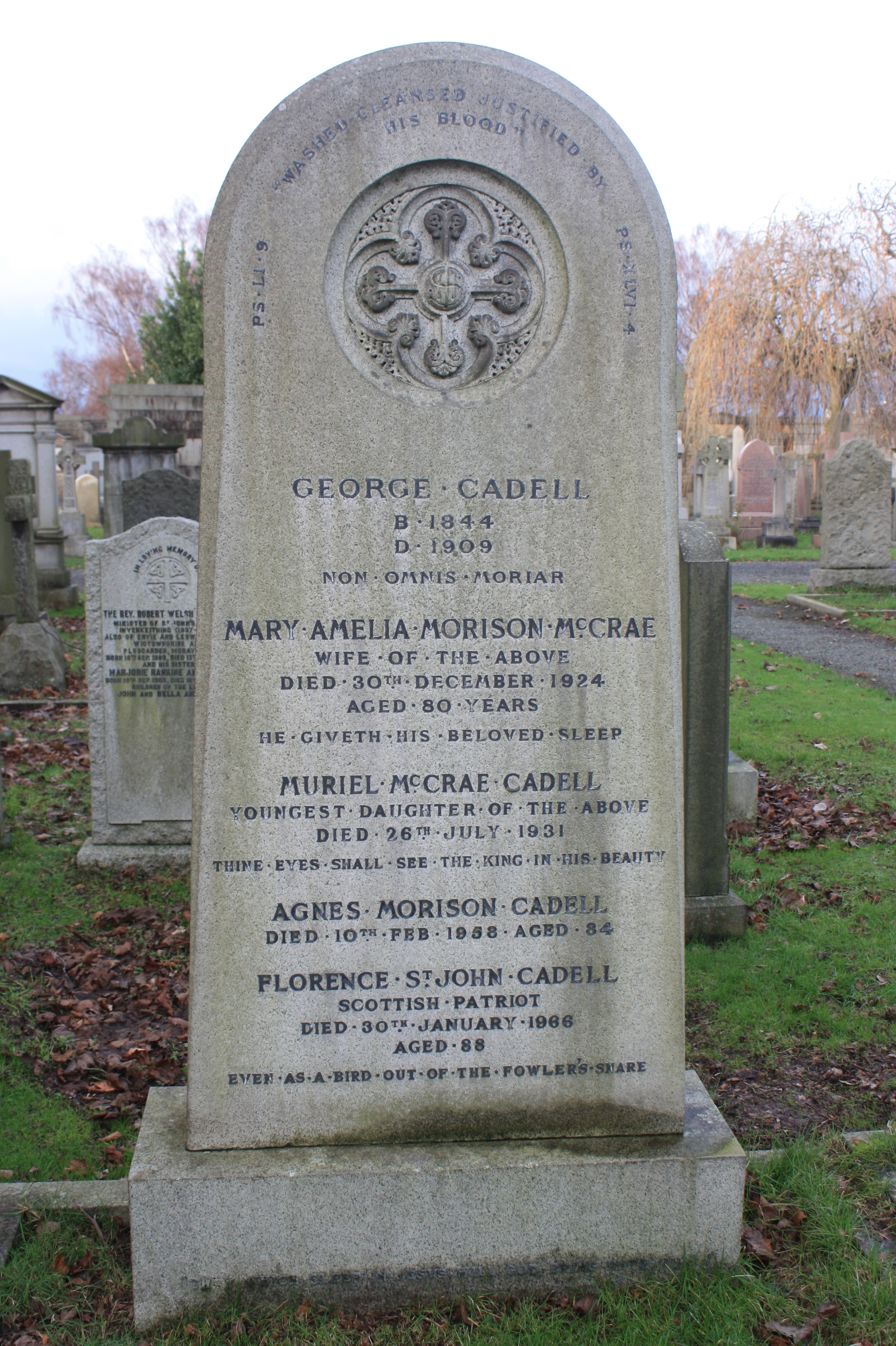
Gravestone quoting a line

The gravestone of the artist Florence St John Cadell bears a line from Psalm 124: "even as a bird out of the fowler's snare".

== Text ==
The following table shows the Hebrew text of the Psalm with vowels, alongside the Koine Greek text in the Septuagint and the English translation from the King James Version. Note that the meaning can slightly differ between these versions, as the Septuagint and the Masoretic Text come from different textual traditions. (Note: A 1917 translation directly from Hebrew to English by the Jewish Publication Society can be found here or here, and an 1844 translation directly from the Septuagint by L. C. L. Brenton can be found here. Both translations are in the public domain.) In the Septuagint, this psalm is numbered Psalm 123.

#	Hebrew	English	Greek
1	שִׁ֥יר הַֽמַּעֲל֗וֹת לְדָ֫וִ֥ד לוּלֵ֣י יְ֭הֹוָה שֶׁהָ֣יָה לָ֑נוּ יֹאמַר־נָ֝֗א יִשְׂרָאֵֽל׃	(A Song of degrees of David.) If it had not been the LORD who was on our side, now may Israel say;	᾿ῼδὴ τῶν ἀναβαθμῶν. - ΕΙ ΜΗ ὅτι Κύριος ἦν ἐν ἡμῖν, εἰπάτω δὴ ᾿Ισραήλ·
2	לוּלֵ֣י יְ֭הֹוָה שֶׁהָ֣יָה לָ֑נוּ בְּק֖וּם עָלֵ֣ינוּ אָדָֽם׃	If it had not been the LORD who was on our side, when men rose up against us:	εἰ μὴ ὅτι Κύριος ἦν ἐν ἡμῖν ἐν τῷ ἐπαναστῆναι ἀνθρώπους ἐφ᾿ ἡμᾶς,
3	אֲ֭זַי חַיִּ֣ים בְּלָע֑וּנוּ בַּחֲר֖וֹת אַפָּ֣ם בָּֽנוּ׃	Then they had swallowed us up quick, when their wrath was kindled against us:	ἄρα ζῶντας ἂν κατέπιον ἡμᾶς ἐν τῷ ὀργισθῆναι τὸν θυμὸν αὐτῶν ἐφ᾿ ἡμᾶς·
4	אֲ֭זַי הַמַּ֣יִם שְׁטָפ֑וּנוּ נַ֝֗חְלָה עָבַ֥ר עַל־נַפְשֵֽׁנוּ׃	Then the waters had overwhelmed us, the stream had gone over our soul:	ἄρα τὸ ὕδωρ ἂν κατεπόντισεν ἡμᾶς, χείμαρρον διῆλθεν ἡ ψυχὴ ἡμῶν·
5	אֲ֭זַי עָבַ֣ר עַל־נַפְשֵׁ֑נוּ הַ֝מַּ֗יִם הַזֵּידוֹנִֽים׃	Then the proud waters had gone over our soul.	ἄρα διῆλθεν ἡ ψυχὴ ἡμῶν τὸ ὕδωρ τὸ ἀνυπόστατον.
6	בָּר֥וּךְ יְהֹוָ֑ה שֶׁלֹּ֥א נְתָנָ֥נוּ טֶ֝֗רֶף לְשִׁנֵּיהֶֽם׃	Blessed be the LORD, who hath not given us as a prey to their teeth.	εὐλογητὸς Κύριος, ὃς οὐκ ἔδωκεν ἡμᾶς εἰς θήραν τοῖς ὀδοῦσιν αὐτῶν.
7	נַפְשֵׁ֗נוּ כְּצִפּ֥וֹר נִמְלְטָה֮ מִפַּ֢ח י֫וֹקְשִׁ֥ים הַפַּ֥ח נִשְׁבָּ֗ר וַאֲנַ֥חְנוּ נִמְלָֽטְנוּ׃	Our soul is escaped as a bird out of the snare of the fowlers: the snare is broken, and we are escaped.	ἡ ψυχὴ ἡμῶν ὡς στρουθίον ἐρρύσθη ἐκ τῆς παγίδος τῶν θηρευόντων· ἡ παγὶς συνετρίβη, καὶ ἡμεῖς ἐρρύσθημεν.
8	עֶ֭זְרֵנוּ בְּשֵׁ֣ם יְהֹוָ֑ה עֹ֝שֵׂ֗ה שָׁמַ֥יִם וָאָֽרֶץ׃	Our help is in the name of the LORD, who made heaven and earth.	ἡ βοήθεια ἡμῶν ἐν ὀνόματι Κυρίου τοῦ ποιήσαντος τὸν οὐρανὸν καὶ τὴν γῆν.
