= Johannes Zahn =

German theologian and musicologist

Johannes Christoph Andreas Zahn (1 August 1817 in Eschenbach/Pegnitz – 17 February 1895 in Neuendettelsau) was a German theologian and musicologist best known for his opus Die Melodien der deutschen evangelischen Kirchenlieder, a critical anthology of almost 9,000 hymn melodies developed and used in German Lutheran churches.

== Biography ==
Johannes C. A. Zahn was the son of the Eschenbach teacher and cantor Johannes Zahn. Between 1832 and 1837 he attended the Nuremberg high school, and studied afterwards in Berlin to obtain his degree in theology in 1841. After attending the Predigerseminar in Munich, he became a house teacher for the residence of Gustav Schulze, a prominent merchant.

In 1847 he was named teacher and prefect of the Royal Schullehrer Seminar in Altdorf bei Nürnberg, and became its head in 1854.

Johannes Zahn dedicated himself particularly to the recovery and critical revision of melodies and hymns developed during and after the Reformation, which he started publishing in 1889, in Gütersloh. The classification system he developed is still used by hymnologists worldwide, in the form Zahn ###, where the number represents the location of the melody or hymn in Zahn's anthology.

Zahn also contributed articles to journals like Siona, Hymnologie, and Euterpe.

Zahn also composed hymns, and is known for writing the original melody Dein König kommt in niedern Hüllen, which appears today as number 14 in the German Protestant hymnal.

== Works ==
- Handbüchlein für angehende Cantoren und Organisten, Nürnberg (1871)
- Die Melodien der deutschen evangelischen Kirchenlieder, aus den Quellen geschöpft und mitgeteilt von Johannes Zahn (6 volumes), Verlag Bertelsmann, Gütersloh (1889–93). [further edited by the Gesellschaft zur wissenschaftlichen Edition des deutschen Kirchenlieds. Hildesheim, New York: Georg Olms Verlagsbuchhandlung, 1998. 6 volumes. ISBN 3-487-09319-7]
- Die Melodien des Deutschen Evangelischen Gesangbuches in vierstimmigem Satze für Orgel und für Chorgesang aus Auftrag der deutschen evangelischen Kirchenkonferenz zu Eisenach (with G. Freiherr von Tucher and Immanuel Faißt), Stuttgart (1854)
- Vierstimmiges Melodienbuch zum Gesangbuch der Evangelisch-Lutherischen Kirche in Bayern, Erlangen (1855)

== Sources ==
- Ruth Engelhardt (1998). "Johannes Zahn". In Bautz, Traugott (ed.). Biographisch-Bibliographisches Kirchenlexikon (BBKL) (in German). Vol. 14. Herzberg: Bautz. cols. 317–320. ISBN 3-88309-073-5.
- James Lyon. Johann Sebastian Bach, chorals: Sources hymnologiques des mélodies, des textes et des théologies. Editions Beauchesne, (2005) ISBN 2-7010-1493-X, 336 pages.
- Correlation between Zahn numbers and HTI tune numbers
