= Wo Gott der Herr nicht bei uns hält, BWV 178 =

1724 church cantata by J.S. Bach

Wo Gott der Herr nicht bei uns hält
- BWV 178
- Chorale cantata by J. S. Bach
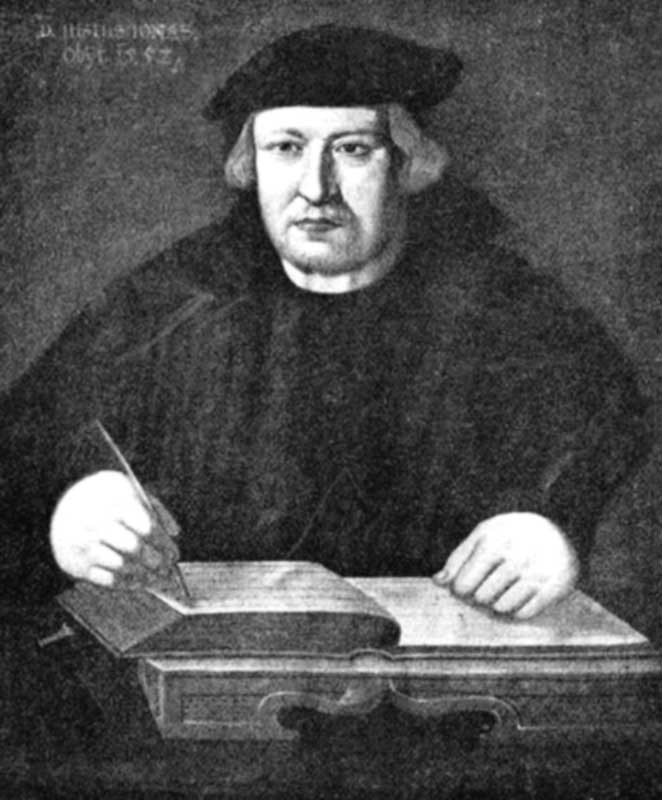
- Justus Jonas, the author of the hymn on which the cantata is based
- Occasion: Eighth Sunday after Trinity
- Chorale: "Wo Gott der Herr nicht bei uns hält" by Justus Jonas
- Performed: 30 July 1724: Leipzig
- Movements: 7
- Vocal: SATB soloists and choir
- Instrumental: corno da caccia; 2 oboes; 2 oboes d'amore; 2 violins; viola; continuo

Wo Gott der Herr nicht bei uns hält (If God the Lord does not remain on our side), BWV 178, is a church cantata by Johann Sebastian Bach. He composed it in Leipzig for the eighth Sunday after Trinity and first performed it on 30 July 1724.

It is the eighth cantata Bach composed for his chorale cantata cycle, the second cantata cycle he started after being appointed Thomaskantor in 1723. The cantata is based on the eight stanzas of the hymn "Wo Gott der Herr nicht bei uns hält" (1524) by Justus Jonas, a paraphrase of Psalm 124. Different from most cantatas in the cycle, the text retains not only the first and last stanza of the chorale but six stanzas, two of them expanded by contemporary lines by an unknown librettist, who also paraphrased two stanzas into aria texts. The first movement is a chorale fantasia, the second a chorale stanza with recitative, the third an aria, the fourth and central movement is a chorale for a solo voice, the following two movements repeat the pair of chorale with recitative and aria, and the cantata is closed by two stanzas in a four-part setting. Bach thus wrote five different ways of chorale setting.

The cantata is scored for three vocal soloists (alto, tenor and bass), a four-part choir, and a Baroque instrumental ensemble of a horn doubling the chorale melody, two oboes, two oboes d'amore, strings and basso continuo.

== History and words ==
Bach composed the cantata in his second year in Leipzig for the Eighth Sunday after Trinity. The prescribed readings for the Sunday are from the Epistle to the Romans, "For as many as are led by the Spirit of God, they are the sons of God" (Romans 8:12–17), and from the Gospel of Matthew, the warning of false prophets from the Sermon on the Mount (Matthew 7:15–23). The cantata text is based on the hymn "Wo Gott der Herr nicht bei uns hält", published in 1524 by the Lutheran reformer Justus Jonas as a paraphrase of Psalm 124. The theme of the psalm, the need of help against raging enemies, corresponds to the Gospel.

Compared to Bach's other chorale cantatas of the period, the unknown poet kept much of the original text, six of the eight stanzas, expanding two of them by recitative to connect even closer to the Gospel. He paraphrased only stanzas 3 and 6 to an aria each. In the last aria, in a statement of opposition to rationalism, the poet expands the words of the reformers' hymn, "Vernunft kann das nicht fassen" (Reason cannot grasp it), making it an appeal to reason, described as unstable and frenzied, to be silent.

Bach led the first performance of the cantata, with the Thomanerchor, on 30 July 1724, as the eighth chorale cantata of his second annual cycle.

Most of Bach's output was neglected after his death in 1750 until the Bach Revival of the 19th century. However, there was continued interest in the chorale cantatas. There is evidence that Bach's son Wilhelm Friedemann performed this cantata in Halle. Also, Bach's biographer Johann Nikolaus Forkel, despite having little to say about the cantatas in his life of the composer, borrowed the manuscripts of chorale cantatas from Wilhelm Friedemann, and copied two of them, Es ist das Heil uns kommen her, BWV 9, and this cantata.

== Music ==
=== Structure and scoring ===
Bach structured the cantata in seven movements. Both text and tune of the hymn are retained in the outer choral movements, a chorale fantasia and a four-part closing chorale, and also in the central movement, a chorale for a solo voice, and in two recitatives that include chorale text and melody, one for a solo voice, the other using the choir for the chorale part. Bach scored the work for three vocal soloists (alto (A), tenor (T) and bass (B), a four-part choir, and a Baroque instrumental ensemble of a horn (Co) to reinforce the chorale melody, two oboes (Ob), two oboes d'amore (Oa), two violin parts (Vl), one viola part (Va), and basso continuo. The duration of the cantata is given as 23 minutes.

In the following table of the movements, the scoring, keys and time signatures are taken from Dürr. The continuo, which plays throughout, is not shown.

Movements of Wo Gott der Herr nicht bei uns hält
No.	Title	Text	Type	Vocal	Winds	Strings	Key	Time
1	Wo Gott der Herr nicht bei uns hält	Jonas	Chorale fantasia	SATB	Co 2Ob	2Vl Va	A minor	common time
2	Was Menschenkraft und -witz anfäht	Jonas, anon.	Chorale and recitative	A				common time
3	Gleichwie die wilden Meereswellen	anon.	Aria	B		2Vl Va	G major	9/8
4	Sie stellen uns wie Ketzern nach	Jonas	Chorale	T	2Oa		B minor	common time
5	Aufsperren sie den Rachen weit	Jonas, anon.	Chorale and recitative	SATB			B minor	common time
6	Schweig, schweig nur, taumelnde Vernunft!	anon.	Aria	T		2Vl Va	E minor	common time
7	Die Feind sind all in deiner Hand	Jonas	Chorale	SATB	2Co	2Vl Va	A minor	common time

=== Movements ===
==== 1 ====
As in most of Bach's chorale cantatas, the opening chorus, "Wo Gott der Herr nicht bei uns hält" (If God the Lord does not remain on our side), is a chorale fantasia. The chorale tune was published in 1529 by an anonymous author in Wittenberg.

The instruments begin a concerto, with the strings playing dotted rhythms" and the oboes adding "agitated sixteenth notes", both throughout the movement. While Sven Hiemke wrote in the foreword of the 2017 Carus edition that "Bach makes it clear that this cantata deals with confrontation and conflict", Dürr noted that it gives the movement a sense of unity.

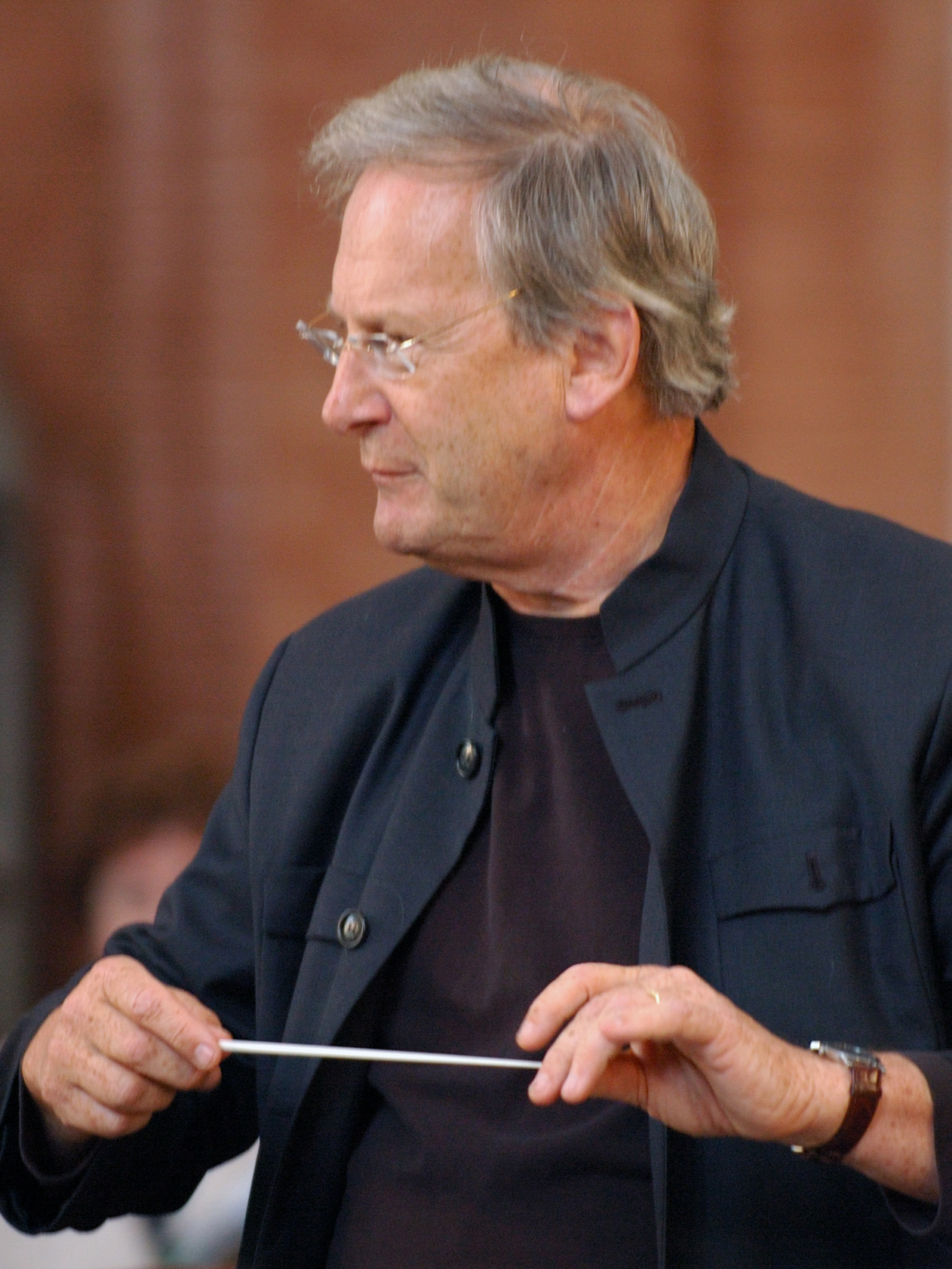
Gardiner in 2012

The soprano sings the chorale melody line by line in augmented tempo, doubled by the horn, as a cantus firmus. The lower voices sing partly in homophony, partly in independent lines similar to the instruments. Bach uses this contrast to illustrate the text in the first lines without regard to its negation. "Wo Gott der Herr nicht bei uns hält" is set in homophony, and the last word "hält" (literally: "holds") is held as a long note, whereas in "wenn unsre Feinde toben" the raging of the enemies is expressed in dotted rhythm and fast runs. When the bar form's Stollen is repeated in the following lines, Bach repeats the music also, although it doesn't reflect the text. John Eliot Gardiner, who conducted the Bach Cantata Pilgrimage in 2000, summarised: "Bach constructs an opening chorus of immense power, sustained energy and astonishing compositional prowess with which to box his listeners' ears."

==== 2 ====
The second movement is a combination of chorale, "Was Menschenkraft und -witz anfäht, soll uns billig nicht schrecken" (What human power and wit conceives shall not easily frighten us), and interspersed recitative, "Denn Gott der Höchste steht uns bei und machet uns von ihren Stricken frei" (For God the Highest stands with us and frees us from their traps). Bach distinguishes the chorale lines from the secco recitative by a continuo line on a repeated motif that is derived from the beginning of the respective chorale tune, but four times as fast".

==== 3 ====
The first aria, sung by the bass, begins "Gleichwie die wilden Meereswellen mit Ungestüm ein Schiff zerschellen" (Just as the wild sea surf crushes a ship with fury). It illustrates the image of "wild sea surf" in undulating lines in the voice and also in the obbligato part of the violins in unison, and in the continuo. The bass voice has to sing challenging coloraturas on the words "Meereswellen" and especially "zerscheitern" (be wrecked). Gardiner noted that the setting evokes both a sea storm and the fury of the enemies for which the analogy stands, wondering how Bach, a resident of landlocked Thuringia, might have experienced a disorienting storm that he illustrated well by varied grouping in 16th-runs.

==== 4 ====
The centre of the cantata is an unchanged stanza of the chorale, "Sie stellen uns wie Ketzern nach, nach unserm Blut sie trachten" (They pursue us as heretics, they seek our blood). The tenor's unadorned melody is accompanied by the oboes d'amore and the continuo as equal partners, with autonomous motifs.

==== 5 ====
The fifth movement is again a combination of chorale, "Auf sperren sie den Rachen weit" (They stretch open their yawning gullet wide), and recitative, "Nach Löwenart mit brüllendem Getöne" (like lions with rumbling roaring;). While Bach differentiates chorale and recitative in the second movement instrumentally, he uses different vocal forces here, treating the chorale lines to four-part settings, while the recitatives are assigned to individual singers in the sequence bass, tenor, alto, bass. The continuo unifies the movement by a constant independent regular motion in arpeggio motifs based on triads; therefore the recitatives here are not in free tempo as usual.

==== 6 ====
The last aria is sung by the tenor, "Schweig, schweig nur, taumelnde Vernunft" (Be silent, hush, frenzied reason!),. Gardiner understood "frenzied reason" here as "weasel words of rationalists, who would bring down the whole Lutheran theological edifice".

Bach uses a setting for strings that illustrates the instability of reason in syncopated rhythm, interrupted by chords on the repeated appeal "schweig" (be silent); "bizarre" melodic lines are interrupted by rests, and the harmonies are unstable. The drama of the aria comes to a rest only at the end of the middle section, when the words "so werden sie mit Trost erquicket" (they will be revived with solace) are marked adagio and lead to a fermata.

==== 7 ====
The cantata is closed by two stanzas of the chorale, "Die Feind sind all in deiner Hand, darzu all ihr Gedanken" (The enemies are all in your hand, together with all their thoughts), both stanzas in the same four-part setting.

== Manuscripts and publication ==
Bach's eldest son Wilhelm Friedemann possessed of a set of parts for the cantata. These manuscripts were written by various scribes including the composer. The set is preserved in Leipzig.

The cantata was first published in 1888 in the first complete edition of Bach's work, the Bach-Gesellschaft Ausgabe. The volume in question was edited by Alfred Dörffel. In the Neue Bach-Ausgabe it was published in 1966, edited by Alfred Dürr, with a critical report following in 1967.

== Recordings ==
A list of recordings is provided on the Bach Cantatas Website. Ensembles playing period instruments in historically informed performance are shown with a green background. The type of choir is generally not indicated, an exception being made for the recording directed by Sigiswald Kuijken, which is unusual for being sung one voice per part. This version was favourably reviewed in the Gramophone, whose critic suggested that this cantata was one of those suited to a small-scale performance.

Recordings of Wo Gott der Herr nicht bei uns hält
Title	Conductor / Choir / Orchestra	Soloists	Label	Year	Choir type	Orch. type
The RIAS Bach Cantatas Project (1949–1952)	Karl Ristenpart RIAS Kammerchor RIAS Kammerorchester	Ingrid Lorenzen; Helmut Krebs; Dietrich Fischer-Dieskau	Audite	1950		
Die Bach Kantate Vol. 44	Helmuth Rilling Gächinger Kantorei Bach-Collegium Stuttgart	Gabriele Schreckenbach; Kurt Equiluz; Wolfgang Schöne	Hänssler	1972		
Bach Cantatas Vol. 4 – Sundays after Trinity I	Karl Richter Münchener Bach-Chor Münchener Bach-Orchester	Julia Hamari; Peter Schreier, Dietrich Fischer-Dieskau	Archiv Produktion	1977		
J. S. Bach: Das Kantatenwerk • Complete Cantatas • Les Cantates, Folge / Vol. 41 – BWV 175-179	Nikolaus Harnoncourt Tölzer Knabenchor Concentus Musicus Wien	Panito Iconomou as soloist of the Tölzer Knabenchor; Kurt Equiluz; Robert Holl	Teldec	1988		Period
Bach Edition Vol. 11 – Cantatas Vol. 5	Pieter Jan Leusink Holland Boys Choir Netherlands Bach Collegium	Sytse Buwalda; Knut Schoch; Bas Ramselaar	Brilliant Classics	1999		Period
J. S. Bach: Complete Cantatas Vol. 14	Ton Koopman Amsterdam Baroque Orchestra & Choir	Annette Markert; Christoph Prégardien; Klaus Mertens	Antoine Marchand	2000		Period
Bach Cantatas Vol. 5: Rendsburg/Braunschweig	John Eliot Gardiner Monteverdi Choir English Baroque Soloists	Robin Tyson; Christoph Genz; Brindley Sherratt	Soli Deo Gloria	2000		Period
J. S. Bach: Cantatas Vol. 23 Cantatas from Leipzig 1724 – BWV 10, 93, 107, 178	Masaaki Suzuki Bach Collegium Japan	Matthew White; Makoto Sakurada; Peter Kooy	BIS	2002		Period
J. S. Bach: Cantatas for the Complete Liturgical Year Vol. 36: "Ich habe genug" – Cantatas BWV 82 · 102 · 178	Sigiswald Kuijken La Petite Bande	Elisabeth Hermans; Petra Noskaiová; Christoph Genz; Jan van der Crabben	Accent	2005	OVPP	Period
J. S. Bach: Wo Gott der Herr nicht bei uns hält	Georg Christoph Biller Thomanerchor Gewandhausorchester	Susanne Krumbiegel; Martin Petzold; Matthias Weichert	Rondeau	2008		
