= Justus Jonas =

German Lutheran theologian (1493–1555)

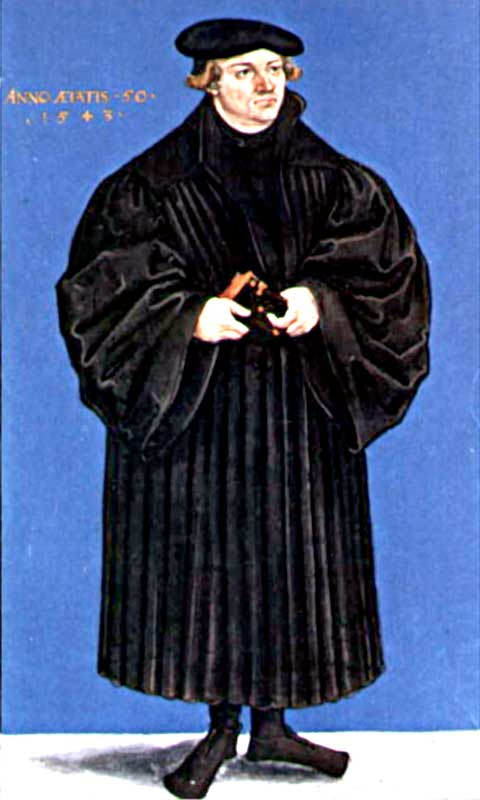
- Born: 5 June 1493; Nordhausen, Holy Roman Empire
- Died: 5 October 1555 (aged 62); Eisfeld, Duchy of Saxony, Holy Roman Empire
- Education: University of Erfurt

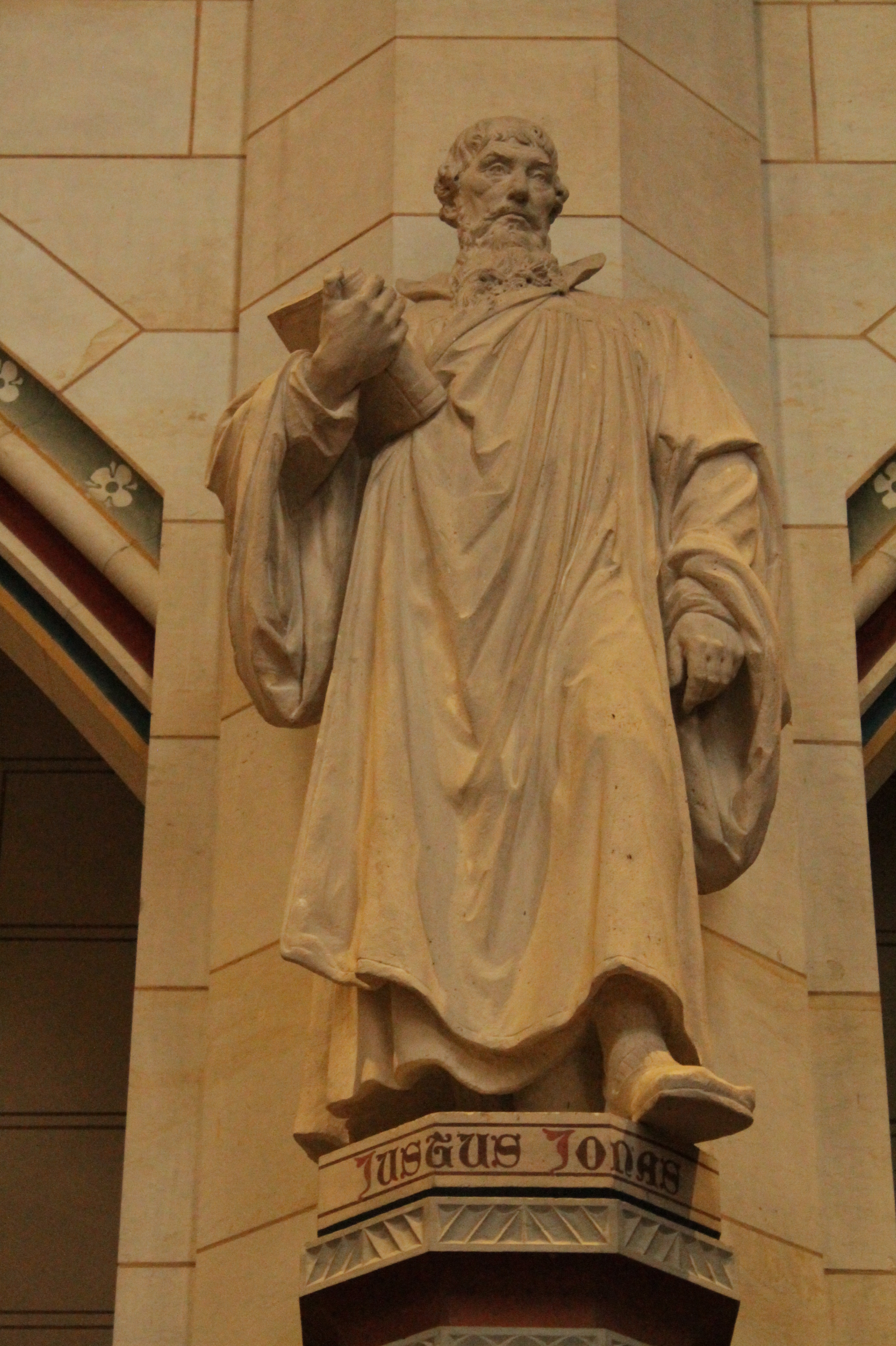
Statue of Justus Jonas, Schlosskirche, Wittenberg

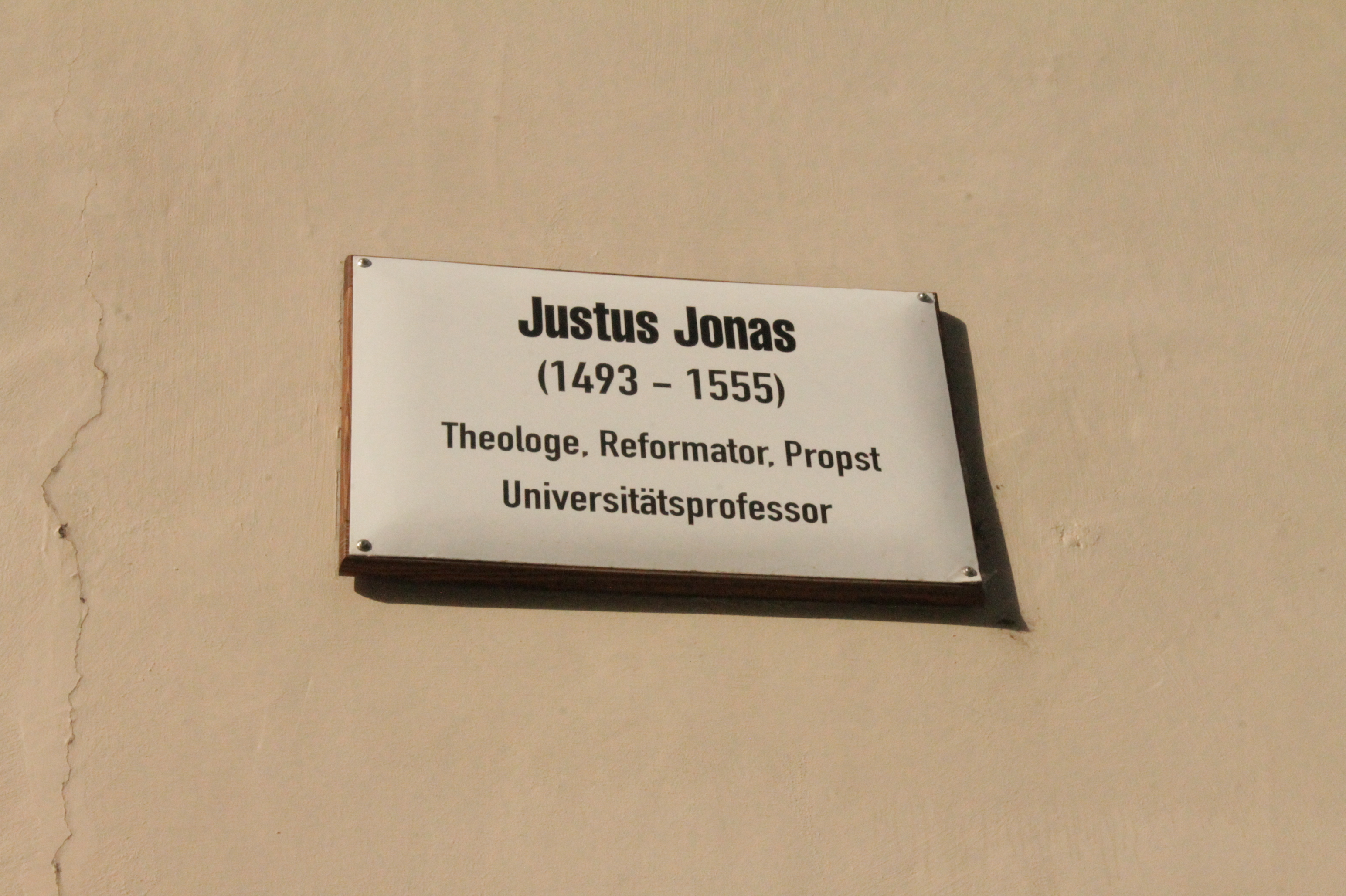
Plaque to Justus Jonas, Wittenberg

Justus Jonas, the Elder (5 June 1493 – 9 October 1555), or simply Justus Jonas, was a German Lutheran theologian and reformer. He was a Jurist, Professor and Hymn writer. He is best known for his translations of the writings of Martin Luther and Philipp Melanchthon. He accompanied Martin Luther in his final moments.

== Life and church ==
Jonas was born at Nordhausen in present-day Thuringia where he was the son of the burgermeister. His birth name was Jodokus (Jobst) Koch, which he changed according to the common custom of German scholars in the sixteenth century, when at the University of Erfurt. He entered that university in 1506, studied law and the humanities, and became Master of Arts in 1510. In 1511, he went to University of Wittenberg, where he took his bachelor's degree in law. He returned to Erfurt in Thuringia during 1514 or 1515 was ordained priest.

In 1518, he was appointed Canon of St. Severus Church (Severikirche) in Erfurt which was a collegiate church. In 1519, he became Rector of the University of Erfurt. In 1521, he was appointed Probst of All Saints' Church (Schlosskirche) at Wittenberg and Professor of Church Law in the University of Wittenberg. From 1541 to 1546, he served as superintendent and chief pastor at Halle.

His great admiration for Erasmus first led him to Greek, Hebrew and Biblical studies, and his election in May 1519 as rector of the university was regarded as a triumph for the partisans of the New Learning. It was not, however, until after the Leipzig Disputation with Johann Eck that Martin Luther won his allegiance. He accompanied Luther to the Diet of Worms in 1521, and there was appointed professor of canon law at Wittenberg.

During Luther's stay in the Wartburg, Jonas was one of the most active of the Wittenberg reformers. Giving himself up to preaching and polemics, he aided the Reformation by his gift as a translator, turning Luther's and Melanchthon's works into German or Latin as the case might be, thus becoming a sort of double of both. Jonas also assisted Luther with his translation of the Bible into the German language.

One of the eight hymns in the first Lutheran hymnal is attributed to him, In Jesu Namen wir heben an (In the name of Jesus we begin), which appeared in 1524 with four hymns by Martin Luther and three by Paul Speratus. His hymn Wo Gott der Herr nicht bei uns hält, a paraphrase of Psalm 124, was published in the Erfurt Enchiridion in 1524. It was used by several composers as a base for organ and choral music, including Bach's chorale cantata BWV 178.

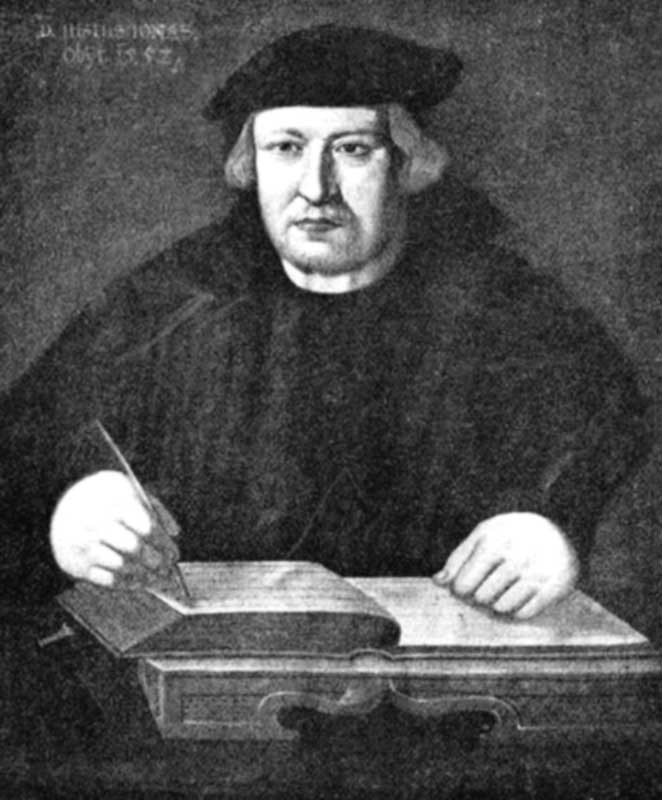
Justus Jonas at work

Jonas was busy in conferences (including a prominent role in the Reformation conferences at Marburg (1529) and Augsburg (1530)) and visitations during the next twenty years, and in diplomatic work with the princes. In the autumn of 1531, Jonas published a German translation of the Apology of the Augsburg Confession, and in 1541, he began a successful preaching crusade in Halle, becoming superintendent of its churches in 1542 or 1544 and priest in the Market Church of Our Dear Lady (Marktkirche Unser Lieben Frauen) the city of Halle, Saxony-Anhalt.

Martin Luther became severely ill and visited his friend during Christmas in 1545. Jonas was present at Luther's deathbed at Eisleben, and preached the funeral sermon; in a procession Luther's body was taken to Halle and buried in Wittenberg. In the same year Jonas was banished from the duchy by Maurice, Duke of Saxony. From that time until his death, Jonas was unable to secure a satisfactory living. He wandered from place to place preaching, and finally went to Eisfeld, Thuringia (1553), where he died, aged 62.

== See also ==
- Christian humanism

== Other sources ==
- Briefwechsel des Justus Jonas, gesammelt und bearbeitet von G. Kawerau (2 vols., Halle, 1884–1885).
- "Justus Jonas" & Apology of the Augsburg Confession". Encyclopædia Britannica Online. Retrieved on 13 January 2007.
- G. Kawerau's article, Herzog-Hauck, Realencyklopadie, ed. 3, with bibliography.
