= Lutheran chorale =

Musical setting of a Lutheran hymn

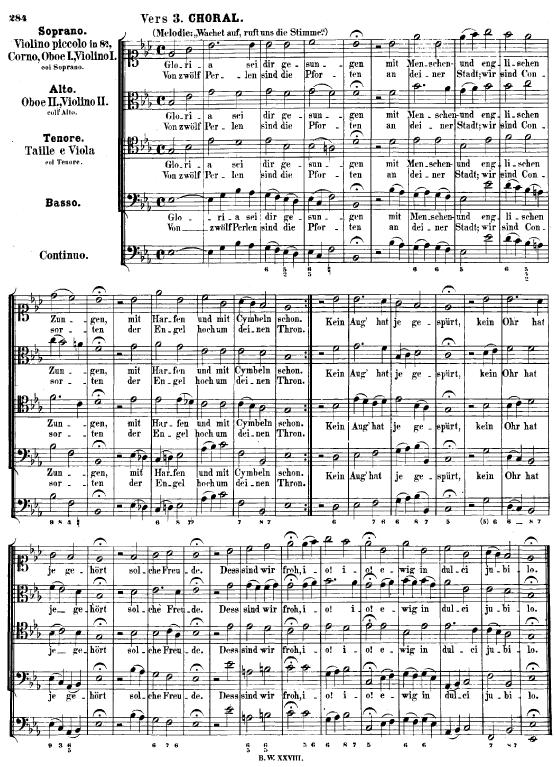
The third stanza of the eponymous chorale in Johann Sebastian Bach's setting as the final movement of his chorale cantata Wachet auf, ruft uns die Stimme, BWV 140

A Lutheran chorale is a musical setting of a Lutheran hymn, intended to be sung by a congregation in a German Protestant church service. The typical four-part setting of a chorale, in which the sopranos (and the congregation) sing the melody along with three lower voices, is known as a chorale harmonization. The practice of singing in unison was the rule of the reformed churches, both in Germany and in other countries.

== Lutheran hymns ==
Starting in 1523, Martin Luther began translating worship texts into German from the Latin. He composed melodies for some hymns himself, such as "Ein feste Burg ist unser Gott" ("A Mighty Fortress Is Our God"), and even a few harmonized settings. For other hymns he adapted Gregorian chant melodies used in Catholic worship to fit new German texts, sometimes using the same melody more than once. For example, he fitted the melody of the hymn "Veni redemptor gentium" to three different texts, "Verleih uns Frieden gnädiglich", "Erhalt uns, Herr, bei deinem Wort", and "Nun komm, der Heiden Heiland". The first Lutheran hymns were published in 1524. These included the Achtliederbuch (known as the first Lutheran hymnal) and the Erfurt Enchiridion (both with unaccompanied melodic settings), as well as Johann Walter's Eyn geystlich Gesangk Buchleyn, the first to contain part song settings of Lutheran hymns.

Luther and his contemporaries referred to these vernacular hymns as geistliche Lieder (spiritual songs), Psalmen (psalms), christliche Lieder (Christian songs), and geistliche (or christliche) Gesänge or Kirchengesänge. The German word Choral, which was originally used to describe Latin plainchant melodies, was first applied to the Lutheran hymn only in the later sixteenth century.

In the modern era, many Lutheran hymns are used in Protestant worship, sometimes sung in four-part harmony. A four-part harmony is the traditional method of organizing chords for 4 different voice ranges: soprano, alto, tenor and bass (known together as 'SATB'). The term 'voice' or 'part' refers to any musical line whether it is a melody sung by singers, a long note played on an instrument or anything in between.

== Composers ==
Composers of tunes for Lutheran hymns, or who adopted such tunes in their compositions:

- Martin Luther (1483–1546)
- Johann Walter (1496–1570)
- Sebald Heyden (1499–1561)
- Nikolaus Herman (c. 1500–1561)
- Johannes Hermann (1515–1593)
- Nikolaus Selnecker (1530–1592)
- Cyriakus Schneegass (1546–1597)
- Joachim a Burck (1546–1610)
- Philipp Nicolai (1556–1608)
- Bartholomäus Gesius (c. 1562–1613)
- Michael Praetorius (1571–1621)
- Melchior Franck (c. 1579–1639)
- Melchior Teschner (1584–1635)
- Michael Altenburg (1584–1640)
- Heinrich Schütz (1585–1672)
- Johann Hermann Schein (1586–1630)
- Samuel Scheidt (1587–1654)
- Johann Schop (c. 1590–1667)
- Heinrich Scheidemann (c. 1595–1663)
- Johann Crüger (1598–1662)
- Andreas Hammerschmidt (1611/1612–1675)
- Dieterich Buxtehude (c. 1638–1707)
- Gottfried Vopelius (1645–1715)
- Johann Pachelbel (1653–1706)
- Johann Sebastian Bach (1685–1750) harmonised hundreds of chorales, typically used at the end of his cantatas and concluding scenes in his Passions. In his St Matthew Passion, he set five stanzas of "O Haupt voll Blut und Wunden" in four different ways. He also used hymns as the base for his cycle of chorale cantatas and chorale preludes. Bach concentrated on the chorales especially in the Chorale cantatas of his second annual cycle, composed mostly in 1724/25.
- Felix Mendelssohn (1809–1847)
- Anton Bruckner (1824–1896).
- Johannes Brahms (1833–1897)
- Max Reger (1873–1916)
- Sigfrid Karg-Elert (1877–1933)
- Igor Stravinsky (1882–1971)
- Ernst Pepping (1901–1981)
- Hugo Distler (1908–1942)
- Sofia Gubaidulina (1931–2025)
- George C. Baker (b. 1951)

== Compositions based on Lutheran chorales ==
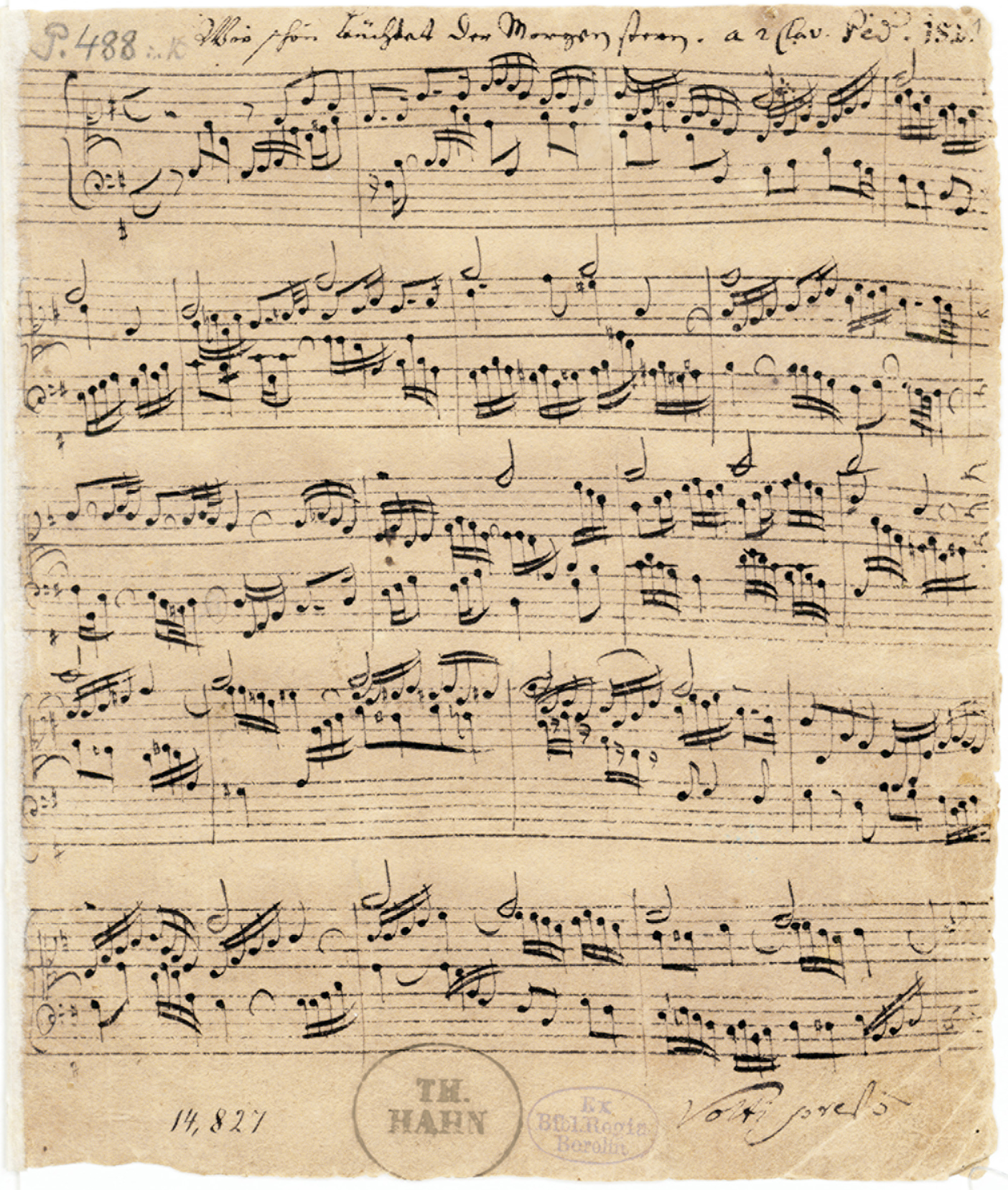
The autograph of Bach's chorale prelude on the hymn "Wie schön leuchtet der Morgenstern", BWV 739

=== Organ ===
Chorales also appear in chorale preludes, pieces generally for organ originally designed to be played immediately before the congregational singing of the hymn, but developed into an autonomous genre by north-German composers of the middle and late 17th century, particularly Dieterich Buxtehude. A chorale prelude includes the melody of the chorale, and adds contrapuntal lines. One of the first composers to write chorale preludes was Samuel Scheidt. Bach's many chorale preludes are the best-known examples of the form. Later composers of the chorale prelude include Johannes Brahms, for example in his Eleven Chorale Preludes, and Max Reger who composed many examples, including Wie schön leucht' uns der Morgenstern (based on the hymn by Philipp Nicolai). In the 20th century, important contributions to the genre were made by Hugo Distler and Ernst Pepping.

=== Other instrumental ===
- Sofia Gubaidulina – Meditation über den Bach-Choral "Vor deinen Thron tret' ich hiermit", for harpsichord, two violins, viola, cello, and contrabass (1993)

== Scholarship ==
Scholarship regarding Lutheran chorales intensified from the 19th century.

=== Carl von Winterfeld ===
The musicologist Carl von Winterfeld published three volumes of Der evangelische Kirchengesang und sein Verhältniss zur Kunst des Tonsatzes (Evangelical church-song and its relation to the art of composition) from 1843 to 1847.

=== Zahn's classification of chorale tunes ===
Johannes Zahn published Die Melodien der deutschen evangelischen Kirchenlieder (the tunes of the German Evangelical hymns) in six volumes from 1889 to 1893.

== Sources ==
- Braun, Werner. 2001. "Walter [Walther], Johann [Johannes] (i)". The New Grove Dictionary of Music and Musicians, second edition, edited by Stanley Sadie and John Tyrrell. London: Macmillan Publishers.
- Leaver, Robin A. 2001. "Luther, Martin". The New Grove Dictionary of Music and Musicians, second edition, edited by Stanley Sadie and John Tyrrell. London: Macmillan Publishers.
- Marshall, Robert L. 2001. "Chorale prelude". The New Grove Dictionary of Music and Musicians, second edition, edited by Stanley Sadie and John Tyrrell. London: Macmillan Publishers.
- Marshall, Robert L., and Robin A. Leaver. 2001. "Chorale". The New Grove Dictionary of Music and Musicians, second edition, edited by Stanley Sadie and John Tyrrell. London: Macmillan Publishers.
- Harten, Uwe. 1996. Anton Bruckner. Ein Handbuch. Salburg: Residenz Verlag. ISBN 3-7017-1030-9.
- Tovey, Donald Francis (1911). "Chorale". In Chisholm, Hugh (ed.). Encyclopædia Britannica (11th ed.). Cambridge University Press.
- Winterfeld, Carl von [in German] (1843–1847). Der evangelische Kirchengesang und sein Verhältniss zur Kunst des Tonsatzes (in German). Vol. I–III. Leipzig: Breitkopf & Härtel. Separate volumes at Google Books:
  - I (1843): Der Evangelische Kirchengesang im ersten Jahrhunderte der Kirchenverbesserung (first centuries of the reformation)
  - II (1845): Der Evangelische Kirchengesang im siebzehnten Jahrhunderte (17th century)
  - III (1847): Der Evangelische Kirchengesang im achtzehnten Jahrhunderte (18th century)
- Zahn, Johannes (1889–1893). Die Melodien der deutschen evangelischen Kirchenlieder (in German). Vol. I–VI. Gütersloh: Bertelsmann. Separate volumes at Internet Archive:
  - I (1889): Zweizeilige bis fünfzeilige Melodien (melodies in two to five lines), Nos. 1–2047
  - II (1890): Sechszeilige Melodien (melodies in six lines), Nos. 2048–4216
  - III (1890): Die siebenzeiligen und jambischen achtzeiligen Melodien (melodies in seven and eight iambic lines), Nos. 4217–6231
  - IV (1891): Die Melodien von den achtzeiligen trochäischen bis zu den zehnzeiligen inkl. enthaltend (melodies in eight trochaic up to and including ten lines), Nos. 6232–8087
  - V (1892): Die übrigen Melodien von den elfzeiligen an, nebst Anhang und Nachlese, sowie das chronologische Verzeichnis der Erfinder von Melodien und alphabetische Register der Melodien (the other melodies of eleven lines and more, with an annex and complement, and also a chronological index of composers of melodies and an alphabetical register of melodies), Nos.8088–8806
  - VI (1893): Schlüßband: Chronologisches Verzeichnis der benutzten Gesang-, Melodien- und Choralbücher, und die letzten Nachträge (closing volume: chronological catalogue of used song-, melody- and choirbooks, and the last supplements)
