= Barmherziges Herze der ewigen Liebe, BWV 185 =

1715 church cantata by J. S. Bach

Barmherziges Herze der ewigen Liebe
- BWV 185
- Church cantata by J. S. Bach
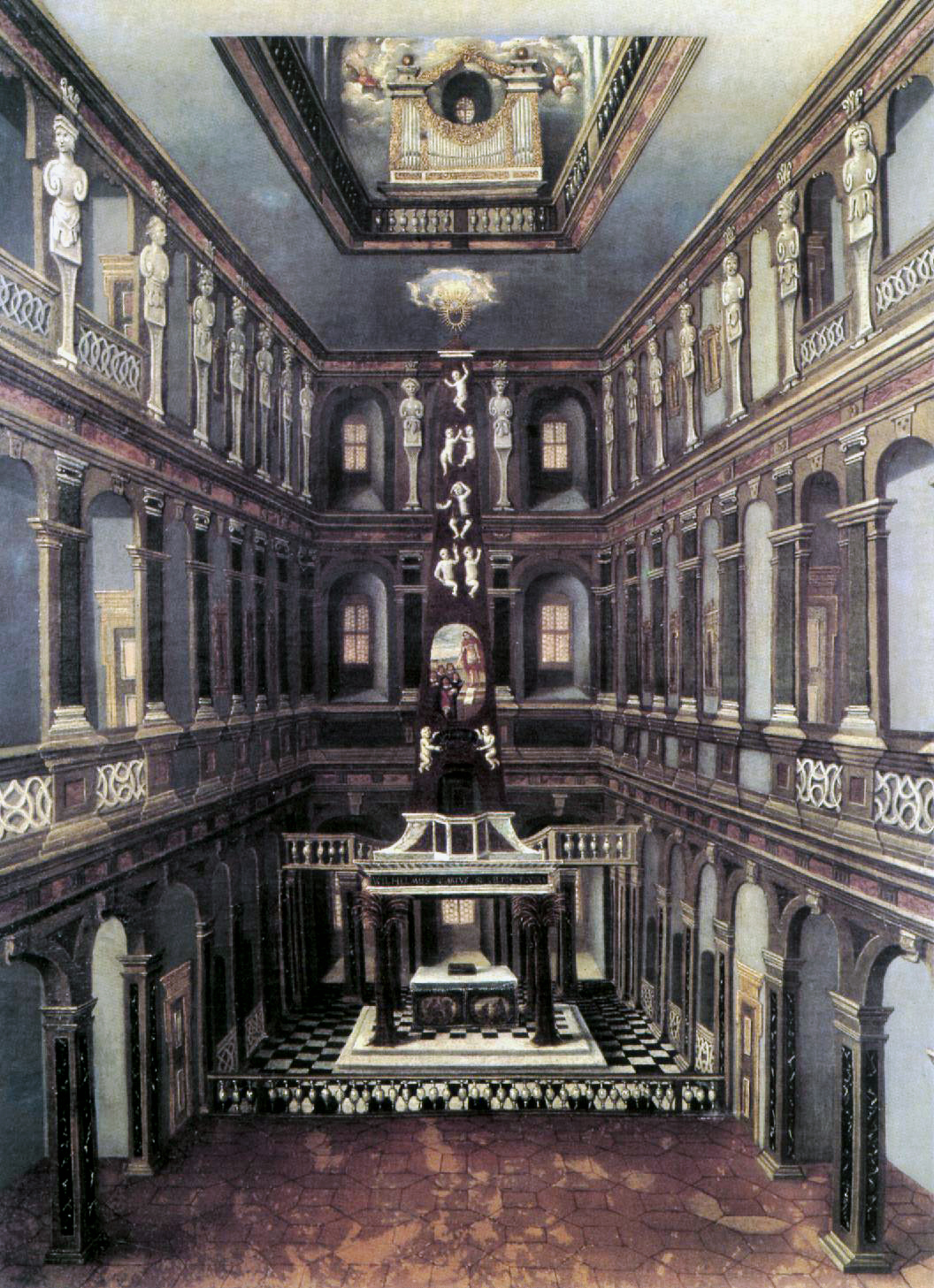
- The Schlosskirche in Weimar
- Occasion: Fourth Sunday after Trinity
- Cantata text: Salomon Franck
- Chorale: by Johannes Agricola
- Performed: 14 July 1715: Weimar
- Movements: 6
- Vocal: SATB soloists and choir
- Instrumental: oboe; 2 violins; viola; continuo with bassoon

Johann Sebastian Bach composed the church cantata Barmherziges Herze der ewigen Liebe (Merciful heart of eternal love), BWV 185, in Weimar for the fourth Sunday after Trinity and first performed it on 14 July 1715.

Bach composed the cantata as concertmaster in Weimar, responsible for one church cantata per month. The text was written by the court poet Salomon Franck for the occasion and published in 1715. He included as the closing choral the first stanza of Johannes Agricola's hymn "Ich ruf zu dir, Herr Jesus Christ". The cantata is structured in six movements and begins with a duet, followed by a sequence of alternating arias and recitatives and closed by a four-part chorale. It is scored for a small ensemble of four vocal parts, oboe, strings and continuo.

Bach led the first performance in the court chapel of Schloss Weimar on 14 July 1715. He performed the cantata again, with small instrumental revisions, at the beginning of his tenure as Thomaskantor in Leipzig, coupled with the new cantata Ein ungefärbt Gemüte, BWV 24.

== History and words ==
On 2 March 1714 Bach was appointed concertmaster of the Weimar court capelle of the co-reigning dukes Wilhelm Ernst and Ernst August of Saxe-Weimar. As concertmaster, he assumed the principal responsibility for composing new works, specifically cantatas for the Schlosskirche (palace church), on a monthly schedule. He wrote this cantata for the Fourth Sunday after Trinity.

The prescribed readings for the Sunday were from the Epistle to the Romans, "For the earnest expectation of the creature waiteth for the manifestation of the sons of God" (Romans 8:18–23), and from the Sermon on the Mount in the Gospel of Luke: the injunctions to "be merciful", "judge not" (Luke 6:36–42). The cantata text was written by the court poet Salomon Franck for the occasion and published in 1715 in Evangelisches Andachts-Opffer. Franck stayed close to the theme of the gospel, recalling the injunctions and the parables of the mote and the beam and the blind leading the blind. The last aria summarizes the admonitions as "Das ist der Christen Kunst" (This is the Christians' art). The cantata is closed by the first stanza of Johannes Agricola's hymn "Ich ruf zu dir, Herr Jesus Christ" (1531). Albert Schweitzer criticized the libretto as "bland, lesson-like".

Bach first performed the cantata on 14 July 1715. He dated it himself "1715". When Bach performed the cantata again in Leipzig on 20 June 1723, he transposed it from F-sharp minor to G minor and made changes to the instrumentation. In that service, his fourth in Leipzig, he performed it together with a new cantata Ein ungefärbt Gemüte, BWV 24, after he had started his tenure as cantor with cantatas in two parts, Die Elenden sollen essen, BWV 75, and Die Himmel erzählen die Ehre Gottes, BWV 76. He treated the same chorale in the chorale cantata Ich ruf zu dir, Herr Jesu Christ, BWV 177, for the same occasion in 1724. Bach revived the cantata once more in 1746 or 1747.

== Music ==
=== Structure and scoring ===
Bach structured the cantata in six movements, beginning with a duet, followed by a series of alternating recitatives and arias and concluded by a chorale. Similar to several other cantatas on words by Franck, it is scored for a small ensemble: four vocal soloists (soprano (S), alto (A), tenor (T) and bass (B)), oboe (Ob), two violins (Vl), viola (Va), and basso continuo (Bc) including bassoon (Fg). A choir is only needed for the chorale, if at all. The score, partly an autograph, is titled "Concerto. / Dominica post Trinit: / Brmhertziges Hertze der ewigen Liebe. ect. / â 5 Strom. 4 Voci / Tromba / 1 Hautb 2 Violini. 1 Viola. / Violoncello / è Fagotto. S. A. T. è Baßo con Cont. / di JSbach. / 1715", while "tromba" (trumpet) is struck in the cover of the set of parts.

In Leipzig the oboe was replaced by a clarino (trumpet) for the instrumental cantus firmus of the chorale in the first movement. The duration is given as 16 minutes.

In the following table of the movements, the scoring and keys are given for the version performed in Weimar in 1714. The keys and time signatures are taken from the Bach scholar Alfred Dürr, using the symbol for common time (4/4). The instruments are shown separately for winds and strings, while the continuo, playing throughout, is not shown.

Movements of Barmherziges Herze der ewigen Liebe
No.	Title	Text	Type	Vocal	Winds	Strings	Key	Time
1	Barmherziges Herze der ewigen Liebe	Franck	Duet	S T	Ob		F-sharp minor	6/4
2	Ihr Herzen, die ihr euch in Stein und Fels verkehret	Franck	Recitative	A	Fg	2Vl Va		common time
3	Sei bemüht in dieser Zeit	Franck	Aria	A	Ob Fg	2Vl Va	A major	common time
4	Die Eigenliebe schmeichelt sich	Franck	Recitative	B	Fg			common time
5	Das ist der Christen Kunst	Franck	Aria	B	Fg	(2Vl Va)	B-flat minor	common time
6	Ich ruf zu dir, Herr Jesus Christ	Agricola	Chorale	SATB	Ob Fg	2Vl Va	F-sharp minor	common time

=== Movements ===
==== 1 ====
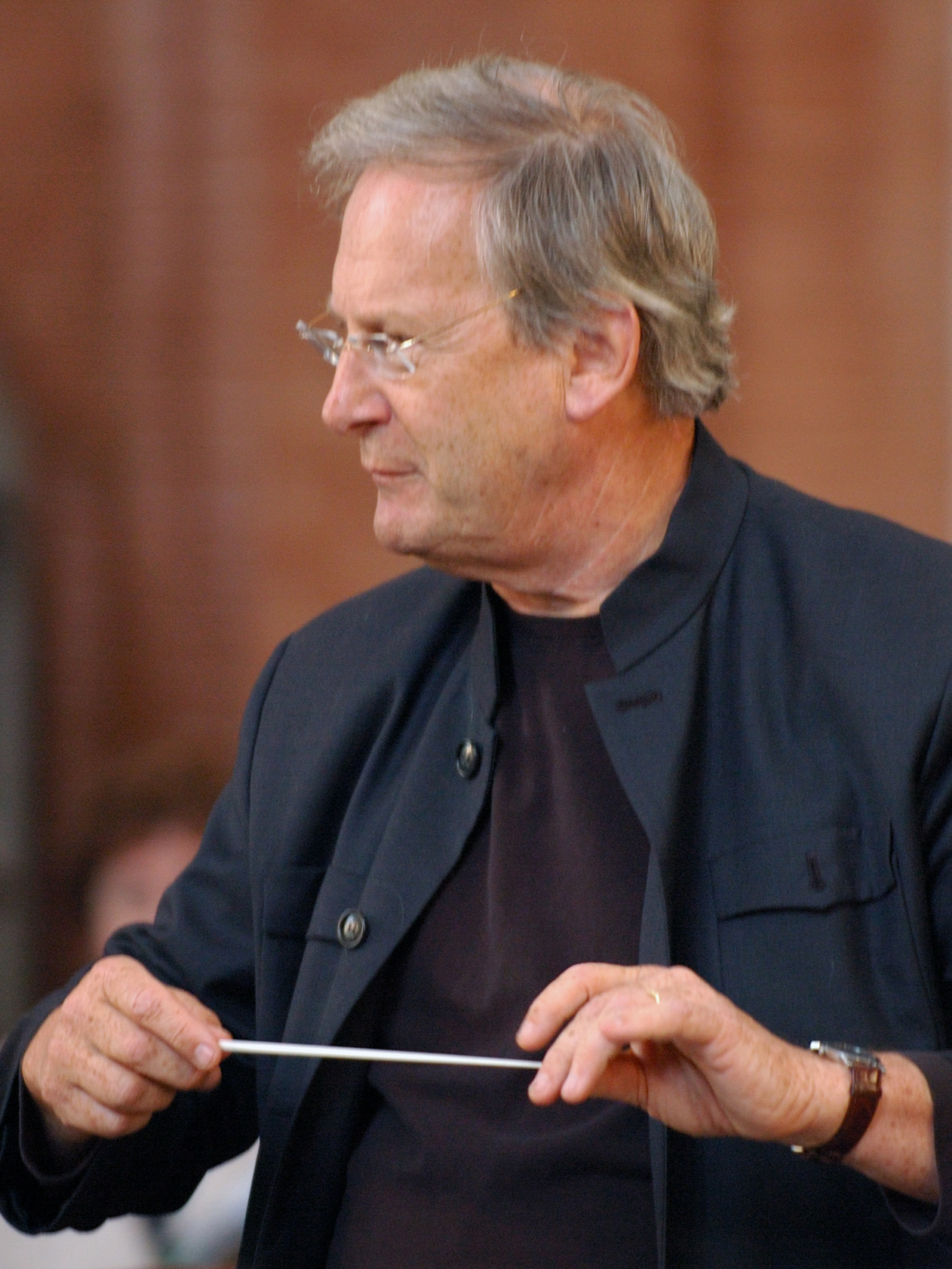
John Eliot Gardiner in 2007

The opening movement is a duet of soprano and tenor, "Barmherziges Herze der ewigen Liebe" (Compassionate heart of eternal love). It is in two ways connected to the chorale which closes the work. The melody is played line by line as a cantus firmus by the oboe, embellished and in a dancing 6/4 time instead of 4/4. The first interval in the voices and the continuo is the same as in the chorale. The countersubject is the inversion of the theme, in German "Spiegelung" (reflection in a mirror). It reflects the theme as human mercy should reflect divine mercy. John Eliot Gardiner, who conducted the Bach Cantata Pilgrimage with the Monteverdi Choir in 2000, comments in his diary of the project: "Cast as a siciliano for soprano and tenor with cello continuo, there is a warm glow to this opening duet, with trills on each of the main beats to signify the flickering flame of love, and a plea to 'come melt my heart'. Agricola's chorale tune [...] is meanwhile intoned by a clarino hovering above the two amorous vocal lines.

==== 2 ====
The alto recitative, "Ihr Herzen, die ihr euch in Stein und Fels verkehret" (You hearts, which have changed yourselves into rocks and stones), is first accompanied by the strings, but ends as an arioso with continuo.

==== 3 ====
The alto aria, "Sei bemüht in dieser Zeit" (Be inspired at the present time) shows the richest instrumentation, with figurative oboe solos.

==== 4 ====
The bass recitative "Die Eigenliebe schmeichelt sich!" (Self-love flatters itself!) is accompanied only by the continuo.

==== 5 ====
The text of the bass aria with continuo, "Das ist der Christen Kunst" (This is the Christian's art), summarizes all injunctions in one long sentence, but Bach splits it in parts, all introduced by the keywords "Das ist der Christen Kunst". The bass as the vox Christi (voice of Christ) delivers the "sermon". In Leipzig, the continuo of cello and bass in octaves was doubled by the strings, another octave higher. Gardiner admires Bach's treatment as a "gentle, parodistic way he portrays the rhetorical displays of a pompous preacher".

==== 6 ====
The closing chorale, "Ich ruf zu dir, Herr Jesu Christ" (I call to You, Lord Jesus Christ), summarizes the topic of the cantata to love and serve the neighbour.

Ich ruf zu dir, Herr Jesu Christ,
ich bitt, erhör mein Klagen,
verleih mir Gnad zu dieser Frist,
laß mich doch nicht verzagen
den rechten Weg, o Herr, ich mein,
den wollest du mir geben,
dir zu leben,
mein'n Nächsten nütz zu sein,
dein Wort zu halten eben.

Translation:

I call to You, Lord Jesus Christ,
I beg You, hear my cries,
grant me mercy at this time,
do not let me despair;
the true faith, Lord, I mean
that You would give me,
to live for You,
to be of use to my neighbor,
to keep Your word faithfully.

It is illuminated by a "soaring" violin as a fifth part, similar to the treatment in the cantata for Pentecost the previous year, Erschallet, ihr Lieder, BWV 172.

=== Reception ===
The musicologist Isoyama summarizes: "... we are bound to admire the emotional wealth with which Bach's music infuses the poetry. In that it gives living reality to a potentially dry text, this work may be numbered among Bach's masterpieces".

== Recordings ==
The listing is taken from the selection provided on the Bach Cantatas Website. Ensembles playing period instruments in historically informed performance are marked by green background.

Recordings of Barmherziges Herze der ewigen Liebe
Title	Conductor / Choir / Orchestra	Soloists	Label	Year	Orch. type
Die Bach Kantate Vol. 42	Helmuth Rilling Frankfurter Kantorei Bach-Collegium Stuttgart	Arleen Auger; Hildegard Laurich; Aldo Baldin; Philippe Huttenlocher	Hänssler	1976	Chamber
J. S. Bach: Das Kantatenwerk • Complete Cantatas • Les Cantates, Folge / Vol. 10	Gustav Leonhardt: Tölzer Knabenchor; Collegium Vocale Gent; Leonhardt-Consort	boy soloist of the Tölzer Knabenchor; Paul Esswood; Kurt Equiluz; Thomas Hampson	Teldec	1989	Period
J. S. Bach: Complete Cantatas Vol. 1	Ton Koopman Amsterdam Baroque Orchestra & Choir	Barbara Schlick; Kai Wessel; Guy de Mey; Klaus Mertens	Antoine Marchand	1994	Period
J. S. Bach: Cantatas Vol. 4	Masaaki Suzuki Bach Collegium Japan	Midori Suzuki; Akira Tachikawa; Makoto Sakurada; Stephan Schreckenberger	BIS	1999	Period
Bach Edition Vol. 2 – Cantatas Vol. 6	Pieter Jan Leusink Holland Boys Choir Netherlands Bach Collegium	Ruth Holton; Sytse Buwalda; Knut Schoch; Bas Ramselaar	Brilliant Classics	1999	Period
Bach Cantatas Vol. 3: Tewkesbury/Mühlhausen / For the 4th Sunday after Trinity / For the 5th Sunday after Trinity	John Eliot Gardiner Monteverdi Choir English Baroque Soloists	Magdalena Kožená; Nathalie Stutzmann; Paul Agnew; Nicolas Testé	Soli Deo Gloria	2000	Period

== Sources ==
- Barmherziges Herze der ewigen Liebe, BWV 185: Scores at the International Music Score Library Project
- Barmherziges Herze der ewigen Liebe, BWV 185; BC A 101 / Sacred cantata (4th Sunday after Trinity), Bach Digital
- Luke Dahn: BWV 185.6, bach-chorales.com
