= Ich ruf zu dir, Herr Jesu Christ, BWV 177 =

Chorale cantata by Johann Sebastian Bach

Ich ruf zu dir, Herr Jesu Christ
- BWV 177
- Chorale cantata by J. S. Bach
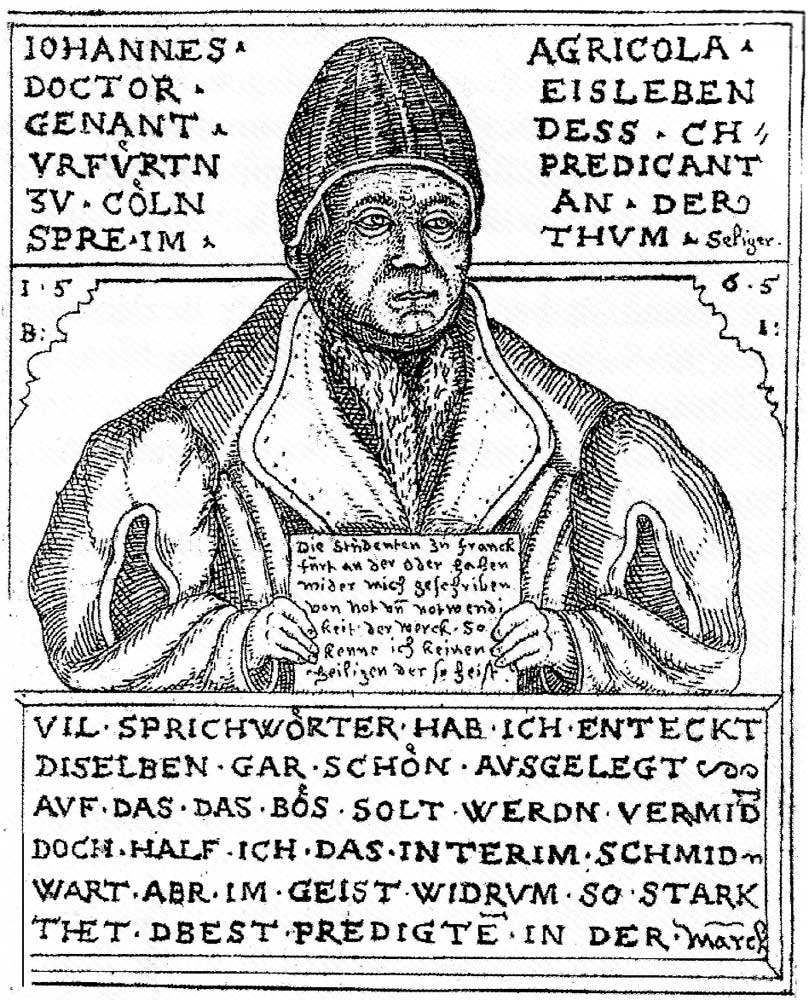
- Johann Agricola, author of the chorale
- Occasion: Fourth Sunday after Trinity
- Chorale: by Johann Agricola
- Performed: 6 July 1732: Leipzig
- Movements: 5
- Vocal: SATB choir; solo: soprano, alto and tenor
- Instrumental: 2 oboes; 2 oboes da caccia; bassoon; 2 violins; viola; continuo

Johann Sebastian Bach composed the church cantata Ich ruf zu dir, Herr Jesu Christ (I call to You, Lord Jesus Christ), BWV 177. He wrote the chorale cantata in Leipzig for the fourth Sunday after Trinity and first performed it on 6 July 1732. The cantata text is formed by the unchanged five stanzas of Johann Agricola's hymn.

== History and words ==
Bach composed the cantata in Leipzig as late as 1732 in order to complete his second annual cycle of chorale cantatas of 1724/25, which lacked a cantata for the Fourth Sunday after Trinity because that Sunday had been the Feast of Visitation in 1725, celebrated then by Meine Seel erhebt den Herren, BWV 10.

The prescribed readings for the Sunday were from the Epistle to the Romans, "For the earnest expectation of the creature waiteth for the manifestation of the sons of God" (Romans 8:18–23), and from the Sermon on the Mount in the Gospel of Luke: the admonition to "be merciful", "judge not" (Luke 6:36–42). The cantata text is formed by the unchanged five stanzas of Johann Agricola's chorale (ca. 1530), a main hymn for the Sunday, used also in Bach's cantata Barmherziges Herze der ewigen Liebe, BWV 185, written in Weimar. In Gelobet sei der Herr, mein Gott, BWV 129, also composed to complete the second annual cycle of chorale cantatas, Bach also used the unchanged words of the chorale, different from the cantatas originally composed for the cycle.

Bach first performed the cantata on 6 July 1732.

== Scoring and structure ==
The cantata in five movement is scored for three soloists (soprano, alto and tenor), a four-part choir, two oboes, two oboes da caccia, two violins, viola, basso continuo, an obbligato violin and an obbligato bassoon.

1. Chorus: Ich ruf zu dir, Herr Jesu Christ
2. Versus 2 (alto): Ich bitt noch mehr, o Herre Gott
3. Versus 3 (soprano): Verleih, daß ich aus Herzensgrund
4. Versus 4 (tenor): Laß mich kein Lust noch Furcht von dir
5. Versus 5 (chorale): Ich lieg im Streit und widerstreb

== Music ==
Similar to most chorale cantatas, the opening chorus is a chorale fantasia, presenting the chorale line by line, the cantus firmus here sung by the soprano. Most of the lines are preceded by entries of the other voices in imitation of motifs independent of the chorale melody. In line 6 the imitation motive is taken from the chorale. In the two last lines 8 and 9 the lower voices enter together with the soprano. The vocal structure is embedded in a concerto of solo violin and two oboes which play the cantus firmus colla parte with the soprano, strings and continuo.

The three arias for the following verses show increasing instrumental complexity. Verse 2 is accompanied by continuo only, verse 3 by oboe da caccia, verse 4 by the rare combination of violin and bassoon. The musicologist Julian Mincham observes a "journey from uncertainty and doubt to warmth and acceptance and finally to rejoicing and jubilation".

In the finale chorale Bach used ornamentation for expressiveness.

== Recordings ==
The listing is taken from the selection on the Bach Cantatas Website.

- Die Bach Kantate Vol. 41, Helmuth Rilling, Gächinger Kantorei, Bach-Collegium Stuttgart, Arleen Augér, Julia Hamari, Peter Schreier, Hänssler 1981
- J. S. Bach: Das Kantatenwerk – Sacred Cantatas Vol. 9, Nikolaus Harnoncourt, Tölzer Knabenchor, Concentus Musicus Wien, soloists of the Tölzer Knabenchor, Kurt Equiluz, Teldec 1988
- Bach Cantatas Vol. 3, John Eliot Gardiner, Monteverdi Choir, English Baroque Soloists, Magdalena Kožená, Nathalie Stutzmann, Paul Agnew, conductor Soli Deo Gloria 2000
- J. S. Bach: Complete Cantatas Vol. 21, Ton Koopman, Amsterdam Baroque Orchestra & Choir, Sandrine Piau, Bogna Bartosz, Christoph Prégardien, Antoine Marchand 2003
- J. S. Bach: Cantatas for the Complete Liturgical Year Vol. 2, Sigiswald Kuijken, La Petite Bande, Siri Thornhill, Petra Noskaiová, Christoph Genz, Accent 2005

== See also ==
- Ich ruf zu dir, Herr Jesu Christ, BWV 639. This work is a chorale prelude which Bach included in the Orgelbüchlein.

== Sources ==
- Ich ruf zu dir, Herr Jesu Christ, BWV 177: Scores at the International Music Score Library Project
- Ich ruf zu dir, Herr Jesu Christ BWV 177; BC A 103 / Chorale cantata (4th Sunday after Trinity), Bach Digital
- BWV 177 Ich ruf zu dir, Herr Jesu Christ English translation, University of Vermont
- BWV 177 Ich ruf zu dir, Herr Jesu Christ text, scoring, University of Alberta
- Gardiner, John Eliot (2008). Johann Sebastian Bach (1685-1750) / Cantatas Nos 24, 71, 88, 93, 131, 177 & 185 (Cantatas Vol 3) (Media notes). Soli Deo Gloria (at Hyperion Records website).
- Luke Dahn: BWV 177.5 bach-chorales.com
