= Meine Seufzer, meine Tränen, BWV 13 =

Church cantata by Johann Sebastian Bach

Meine Seufzer, meine Tränen
- BWV 13
- Church cantata by J. S. Bach
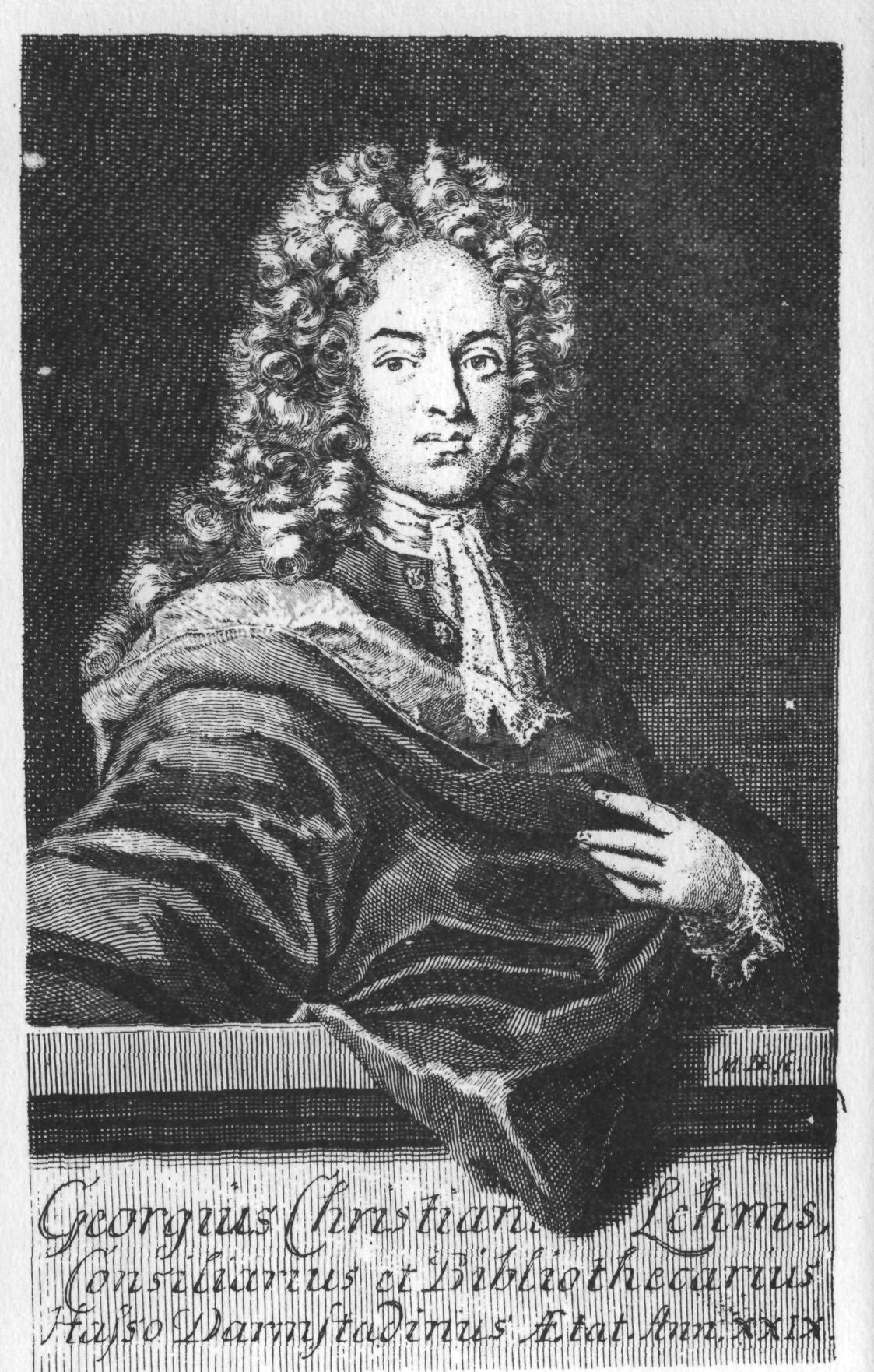
- Lehms, the librettist
- Occasion: Second Sunday after Epiphany
- Cantata text: Georg Christian Lehms
- Chorale: by Johann Heermann; by Paul Fleming
- Performed: 20 January 1726: Leipzig
- Movements: 6
- Vocal: SATB soloists and choir
- Instrumental: 2 flutes; oboe da caccia; 2 violins; viola; continuo

Meine Seufzer, meine Tränen ('My sighs, my tears'), BWV 13, is a church cantata by Johann Sebastian Bach. He composed it in Leipzig for the second Sunday after Epiphany and first performed it on 20 January 1726 as part of his third cantata cycle.

Bach composed the cantata in his third year as Thomaskantor, setting a libretto which Georg Christian Lehms, a court poet in Darmstadt, had already published in 1711. Lehms based his text on one idea from the prescribed gospel, Jesus saying: "Mine hour is not yet come". The text is divided into two groups of three movements each, both concluded with a chorale. The first group features first an aria, then a recitative, the second first a recitative, then an aria. The third movement is the second stanza of Johann Heermann's hymn "Zion klagt mit Angst und Schmerzen", the closing chorale is the final stanza of Paul Fleming's "In allen meinen Taten".

The cantata is scored for four soloists, a four-part choir (SATB) only in the closing chorale, two recorders, oboe da caccia, strings and continuo.

== History and words ==
Bach composed the cantata in his third year as Thomaskantor (director of church music) in Leipzig for the Second Sunday after Epiphany. The prescribed readings for the Sunday were taken from the Epistle to the Romans, we have several gifts, each is unique, as part of the body of Christ (cf also I Corinthians 12) (Romans 12:6–16), and from the Gospel of John, the Wedding at Cana (John 2:1–11).?

Bach set a text written by Georg Christian Lehms, court poet in Darmstadt, who published it in 1711. Bach had set texts by Lehms already when he composed cantatas for the Weimar court from 1714 to 1717. In the 1725/26 Christmas season, he had used mostly librettos by Lehms. The poet took a single idea from the gospel, Jesus saying: "Mine hour is not yet come". The text is divided into two parts of three movements each, the first dealing with the distress of someone feeling abandoned, set as an aria and a recitative, and the second with hope for God's help, a recitative and aria. Both parts are closed by a chorale. The third movement is the second stanza of Johann Heermann's hymn "Zion klagt mit Angst und Schmerzen", the closing chorale is the final stanza of Paul Fleming's "In allen meinen Taten". The Bach scholar Alfred Dürr wrote in his Die Kantaten von Johann Sebastian Bach that it is unlikely that the work was split in performance before and after the service, considering its brevity.

Bach led the first performance at the Thomaskirche on 20 January 1726. The work is regarded as part of Bach's third cantata cycle.

== Music ==
=== Structure and scoring ===
The cantata in six movements is intimately scored for four soloists, soprano (S), alto (A), tenor (T), and bass (B), a four-part choir (SATB) in the chorales, two recorders (Fl), oboe da caccia (Oc), two violins (Vl), viola (Va), and basso continuo. The continuo plays throughout.

Movements of Meine Seufzer, meine Tränen
No.	Title	Text	Type	Vocal	Winds	Strings	Key	Time
1	Meine Seufzer, meine Tränen	Lehms	Aria	T	2Fl Oc		D minor	12/8
2	Mein liebster Gott läßt mich annoch	Lehms	Recitative	A				common time
3	Der Gott, der mir hat versprochen	Heermann	Chorale	A	Fl Oc	2Vl VA	F major	common time
4	Mein Kummer nimmet zu	Lehms	Recitativo	S				common time
5	Ächzen und erbärmlich Weinen	Lehms	Aria	B	Fl	solo violin	G minor	common time
6	So, sei nun, Seele, deine	Fleming	Chorale	SATB	Fl Oc	2Vl VA	B-flat major	common time

=== Movements ===
The cantata is opened by an aria, a lamento accompanied by soft recorders and the dark sound of the oboe da caccia which leads frequently. It is a da capo form, but the middle section is again divided in two parts. In it, the voice shows the "Weg zum Tod" (road to death) by several downward steps. Dürr points out that this composition "illustrates how the imagination of the Baroque musician is particularly fired by texts dealing with sighing and pain". The following short secco recitative ends as an arioso on the words "vergebens flehen" (plead in vain).

In the chorale, the woodwinds play the cantus firmus in unison with the alto voice, while the strings play independent figuration in F major, illustrating hope, although the text says that hope is not yet in sight. John Eliot Gardiner describes the "confident diatonic harmonies" as an "optimistic, wordless answer" to the voice's "prayer for comfort".

A second expressive recitative leads to a second aria, which is accompanied by violin I and the recorders, playing in unison an octave higher. The lamenting text of the beginning "Ächzen und erbärmlich Weinen" (groaning and pitiful weeping) is stressed by intervals such as augmented second, diminished fifth and diminished seventh. The ritornello has two distinctly different parts, a lamenting section and a hopeful one, full of fast runs and passages. In the middle section, the text "wer gen Himmel siehet" (he who looks towards heaven) is accented by an octave leap upwards in the voice and upwards runs in the instruments, contrasting the downward line in movement 1.

The closing chorale is a four-part setting of the melody of "O Welt, ich muss dich lassen" by Heinrich Isaac.

== Recordings ==
The entries are taken from the listing on the Bach Cantatas website. Instrumental groups playing period instruments in historically informed performances are marked green under the header Instr..

Recordings of Meine Seufzer, meine Tränen
Title	Conductor / Choir / Orchestra	Soloists	Label	Year	Instr.
Bach Cantatas Vol. 1 – Advent and Christmas	Karl Richter Münchener Bach-Chor Münchener Bach-Orchester	Edith Mathis; Anna Reynolds; Peter Schreier; Dietrich Fischer-Dieskau	Archiv Produktion	1971	
J. S. Bach: Das Kantatenwerk • Complete Cantatas • Les Cantates, Folge / Vol. 1	Gustav Leonhardt: Tölzer Knabenchor; King's College Choir; Leonhardt-Consort	soloist of the Tölzer Knabenchor; Paul Esswood; Kurt Equiluz; Max van Egmond	Teldec	1972	Period
Die Bach Kantate Vol. 23	Helmuth Rilling Gächinger Kantorei Bach-Collegium Stuttgart	Arleen Auger; Carolyn Watkinson; Adalbert Kraus; Walter Heldwein	Hänssler	1981	
Bach Edition Vol. 9 – Cantatas Vol. 4	Pieter Jan Leusink Holland Boys Choir Netherlands Bach Collegium	Ruth Holton; Sytse Buwalda; Knut Schoch; Bas Ramselaar	Brilliant Classics	1999	Period
Bach Cantatas Vol. 19: Greenwich/Romsey	John Eliot Gardiner Monteverdi Choir English Baroque Soloists	Joanne Lunn; Richard Wyn Roberts; Julian Podger; Gerald Finley	Soli Deo Gloria	2000	Period
J. S. Bach: Complete Cantatas Vol. 17	Ton Koopman Amsterdam Baroque Orchestra & Choir	Sandrine Piau; Bogna Bartosz; Paul Agnew; Klaus Mertens	Antoine Marchand	2001	Period
J. S. Bach: Cantatas Vol. 42 – BWV 13, 16, 32, 72	Masaaki Suzuki Bach Collegium Japan	Rachel Nicholls; Robin Blaze; Gerd Türk; Peter Kooy	BIS	2008	Period
J. S. Bach: Cantatas for the Complete Liturgical Year Vol. 8: "Meine Seufzer, meine Tränen" – Cantatas BWV 13 · 73 · 81 · 144	Sigiswald Kuijken La Petite Bande	Gerlinde Sämann; Petra Noskaiová; Christoph Genz; Jan van der Crabben	Accent	2008	Period
J. S. Bach: Meine Seufzer, meine Tränen, BWV 13	Shunske Sato Netherlands Bach Society	Dorothee Mields; Alex Potter; Thomas Hobbs; Stephan MacLeod	Channel Classics Records	2024	Period
