= Konrad Peutinger =

German humanist (1465–1547)

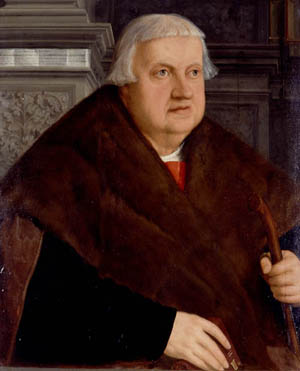
- Portrait by Christoph Amberger, 1543
- Born: 14 October 1465; Augsburg, Holy Roman Empire
- Died: 28 December 1547 (aged 82); Augsburg, Holy Roman Empire
- Occupations: Scholar, antiquarian
- Writing career
- Period: Renaissance
- Movement: Renaissance humanism

Konrad Peutinger (IPA: [ˈkɔnʁaːt ˈpɔʏtɪŋɐ]; 14 October 1465 – 28 December 1547) was a German humanist, jurist, diplomat, politician, economist and archaeologist, serving as Emperor Maximilian I's chief archaeological adviser. A senior official in the municipal government of the Imperial City of Augsburg, he served as a counselor to Emperor Maximilian I and his successor Charles V. Also known as a passionate antiquarian, he collected, with the help of his wife Margareta Welser (1481–1552), one of the largest private libraries north of the Alps.

== Life ==
He was born in Augsburg, the son of a reputable merchant family. He studied law at the universities of Padua in the Venetia and Bologna in Italy, where he obtained his doctorate and came in close touch with the humanism movement. Back in Germany, he was elected syndic of his hometown Augsburg and from 1497 held the office of a town clerk (Stadtschreiber), representing the city in several Imperial diets, notably that of Worms including the hearing of Martin Luther in 1521. Peutinger's accounts were a valuable source for later historians like Theodor Kolde.

He was on close terms with the Habsburg emperor Maximilian I, who appointed him Imperial councilor. Peutinger, an early proponent of economic liberalism, mediated between the Imperial estates and the Augsburg Fugger and Welser families. He was able to assert his position under Maximilian's successor Emperor Charles V, however, his politics aiming at a balance of power were aborted by the advancing Reformation after the 1529 Protestation at Speyer. When in 1534 the citizens of Augsburg turned Protestant, he retired from public offices.

In Augsburg, he established and headed the learned sodality named Sodalitas Augustana (or Sodalitas litteraria Augustana), following the model of the Heidelberg society established by Konrad Celtis. Peutinger built an extensive scholarly and political network that membership was coveted and helped to make humanism a core of Augsburg's political and cultural life.

It was through his influence that Ulrich von Hutten got crowned as a Poet Laureate by Maximilian. Peutinger's daughter Konstantia made the laurel wreath herself.

== Work ==
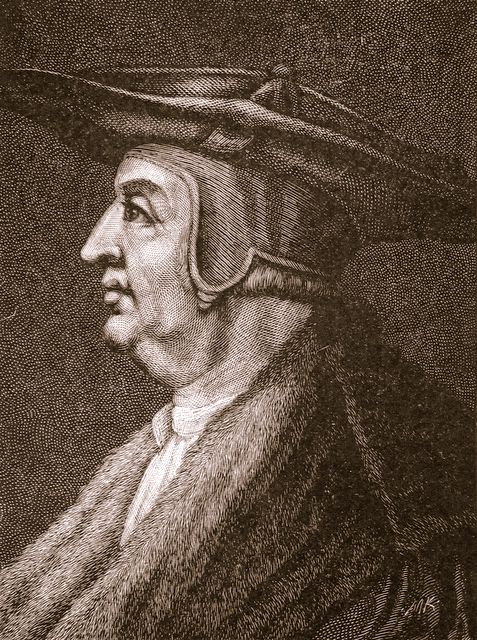
Peutinger in a Renaissance engraving

Peutinger corresponded with notable contemporary humanist scholars like Erasmus of Rotterdam, Jacob Sturm von Sturmeck and Willibald Pirckheimer. During the global spread of the printing press he studied numerous classical philologic and legal works from Italy. In 1520 he was one of the first to publish Roman inscriptions (Inscriptiones Romanæ), a work that has been cited as the most notable of his writings on classical antiquities.

As the author of the Romanae vetustatis fragmenta (published in 1505), Peutinger was the first German scholarly epigraphist.

Peutinger's name is usually associated with the famous Tabula Peutingeriana, a medieval copy of a late antique world map of Roman roads from the British Isles to India and Central Asia. It was discovered by the Viennese scholar Conrad Celtes, who in 1507 handed it over to Peutinger for publication. Parts of the map were not published until 1591 by the Antwerp-based publishing house of Jan Moretus and in 1598 by Peutinger's relative Marcus Welser and Abraham Ortelius. Rediscovered in 1714, it was archived at the Vienna Imperial Library and first published as a whole by Franz Christoph von Scheyb in 1753.

Peutinger also first printed the Getica of Jordanes and the Historia Langobardorum of Paulus Diaconus.

As an economist and politician, Peutinger played an important role in the monopoly debates of the 16th century. He advised Charles V to allow monopolies on luxury goods, but not on everyday necessities (res viviles) like grain and wine. He also drafted progressive trade laws when working for Maximilian. Crossen calls him "the first great philosophical evangelist of the profit system." During the debate among the Imperial Estates at the 1522–1523 Nuremberg Diet concerning whether the capital stocks of large companies should be limited to 50,000 florin and whether acceptance of external capital should be banned, Peutinger advocated for the large merchants, saying that such methods would only benefit foreigners and that the mining boom created by the activities of large companies had helped to lower prices for the common man.

Peutinger advocated church reform and was an early supporter of Martin Luther. As an official of Augsburg though, he guided the Augsburg Council towards the "middle way" (between wholesale reform and reactionary politics). By 1525, he declared that Luther had presented solid truths from the Scripture, but Luther's position on some matters should be rejected. He advised the Council not to accept any statement that condemned Luther as seductive and heretical.
