= Ein ungefärbt Gemüte, BWV 24 =

Church cantata by Johann Sebastian Bach

Ein ungefärbt Gemüte
- BWV 24
- Church cantata by J. S. Bach
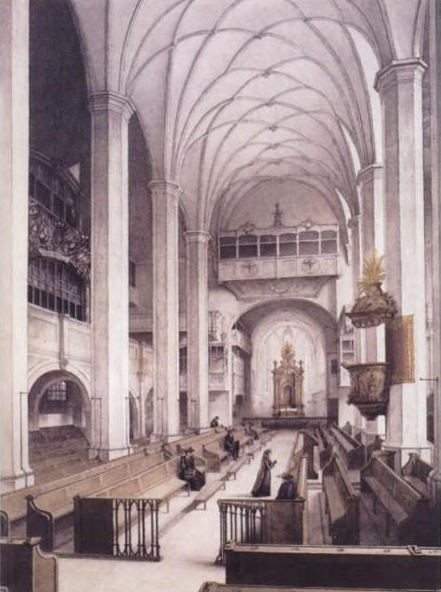
- Thomaskirche, Leipzig
- Occasion: Fourth Sunday after Trinity
- Cantata text: Erdmann Neumeister
- Bible text: Matthew 7:12
- Chorale: by Johann Heermann
- Performed: 20 June 1723: Leipzig
- Movements: 6
- Vocal: SATB; solo: alto, tenor and bass
- Instrumental: clarino; 2 oboes; 2 oboes d'amore; 2 violins; viola; continuo

Johann Sebastian Bach composed the church cantata Ein ungefärbt Gemüte (An open mind) (literally: An undyed mind), BWV 24 in Leipzig for the fourth Sunday after Trinity and first performed it on 20 June 1723. It is the third new cantata of his first cantata cycle in Leipzig. The title has been translated more freely, for example as "An unstained mind", "An unblemished conscience", "An undisguised intention", and "An unsophisticated mind".

== History and words ==
Bach composed the cantata for the Fourth Sunday after Trinity and first performed it on 20 June 1723, three weeks after he took up the position as Thomaskantor in Leipzig with Die Elenden sollen essen, BWV 75. Bach had begun to compose one cantata for almost every Sunday and holiday of the liturgical year, a project described by Christoph Wolff as "an artistic undertaking on the largest scale".

The prescribed readings for the Sunday were from the Epistle to the Romans, "For the earnest expectation of the creature waiteth for the manifestation of the sons of God" (Romans 8:18–23), and from the Sermon on the Mount in the Gospel of Luke: the admonition to "be merciful" and "judge not" (Luke 6:36–42). It seems likely that Bach had not found yet a poet in Leipzig. He used a cantata text by Erdmann Neumeister, published already in 1714 in the collection Geistliche Poesie mit untermischten Biblischen Sprüchen und Choralen (Spiritual poetry with inserted biblical quotations and chorales). In a composition of symmetry, Neumeister placed in the centre a quotation from the Sermon on the Mount in the Gospel of Matthew, "Therefore all things whatsoever ye would that men should do to you, do ye even so to them: for this is the law and the prophets." (Matthew 7:12). He framed it by two recitatives, and those by two arias. The topic of the first recitative is "Die Redlichkeit ist eine von den Gottesgaben" (Sincerity is one of God's gifts). In opposition, the topic of the second is "Die Heuchelei ist eine Brut, die Belial gehecket." (Hypocrisy is a beast coughed up by Belial). The poetry on "Der Christen Tun und Handel" (The Christians' deeds and behaviour), stressing "Treu und Güte" (truth and goodness), has been criticised as "too didactic". Gillies Whittaker described it as "dry, didactic statements and crude denunciations of the failings of mankind". The cantata is closed by the first stanza of Johann Heermann's hymn "O Gott, du frommer Gott" (1630).

It seems likely that Bach performed in the same service also the earlier cantata Barmherziges Herze der ewigen Liebe, BWV 185, composed for the same occasion in Weimar in 1715. He had presented cantatas in two parts on the preceding three Sundays, the new works Die Elenden sollen essen, and Die Himmel erzählen die Ehre Gottes, BWV 76, and the earlier Ich hatte viel Bekümmernis, BWV 21. On the fourth Sunday he likely performed one cantata before and the other after the sermon. According to Christoph Wolff, he probably performed the new work first.

== Scoring and structure ==
The cantata in six movements is scored for three vocal soloists (alto, tenor and bass), a four-part choir, clarino, two oboes, two oboes d'amore, two violins, viola and basso continuo.

Movements of Ein ungefärbt Gemüte
No.	Title	Text	Type	Vocal	Winds	Strings	Key	Time
1	Ein ungefärbt Gemüte		Aria	Alto		2 violins, viola, basso continuo	F major	3/4
2	Die Redlichkeit ist eine von den Gottesgaben		Recitative	Tenor		Basso continuo		4/4
3	Alles nun, das ihr wollet		Tutti	SATB	Clarino, 2 oboes	2 violins, viola, basso continuo	G minor	3/4
4	Die Heuchelei ist eine Brut		Recitative	Bass		2 violins, viola, basso continuo		4/4
5	Treu und Wahrheit sei der Grund		Aria	Tenor	2 oboes d'amore	Basso continuo	A minor	4/4
6	O Gott, du frommer Gott		Chorale	SATB	Clarino, 2 oboes	2 violins, viola, basso continuo	F major	4/4

== Music ==
In his composition, Bach stresses the weight of the central biblical quotation by giving it to the choir, and by scoring the framing recitatives and arias with reduced accompaniment. The obbligato part in the first aria is played by the violins and viola in unison and resembles the vocal part. According to John Eliot Gardiner, Bach thus evokes an "unstained mind". Julian Mincham notes the "sombre and shaded tone quality" of the unison strings. The following recitative, termed an "exemplary mini-sermon in its own right", is secco and ends in an arioso. Here as in the first work for the same occasion, BWV 185, Bach shows the mirror effect of the words, "Mach aus dir selbst ein solches Bild, wie du den Nächsten haben willt!" (Make yourself into such an image, as you would have your neighbour be!) by imitation of voice and continuo. This phrase is rendered three times.

The central choral movement, "a powerful chorus which forms the core of the cantata", is in two sections: the complete text is once rendered in a free form, then again as a fugue, comparable to the concept prelude and fugue. Two oboes double the strings, a clarino plays an independent part. The prelude is in three symmetric sections. The fugue, a double fugue marked "vivace allegro", begins with the first vocal entrance only accompanied by the continuo, the first vocal entries are sung by the concertisten, the choir joins later. The music reaches a climax when the clarino plays the theme as a fifth part to the four vocal parts. The movement ends in free sequences. Mincham describes the "ceaseless activity through constant musical movement" of the music, the "fragmented rhythm" of the countersubject and the "breathless urgency" of the coda.

The following recitative is similar to the first in structure, but accompanied by the strings adding emphasis, mostly on strong beats. The final arioso, without the strings, stresses the prayer "Der liebe Gott behüte mich dafür!" (May dear God spare me from it!). The last aria is accompanied by two oboi d'amore; they play a long "doleful" introduction that is repeated as a postlude. The voice picks up their beginning motif. The tenor voice sings an unusual coloratura line when the text ends on "Macht uns Gott und Engeln gleich" (makes us like God and the angels), possibly representing the multitude of the Heavenly host.

The eight lines of the closing chorale in homophonic four-part vocal setting are richly framed by orchestral interludes and accompanied by the instruments. Bach found the style of chorale treatment in works by his predecessor in Leipzig, Johann Kuhnau. The last prayer asks for "ein unverletzte Seel" (an unsullied soul) "und rein Gewissen" (and a clear conscience).

== Recordings ==
The listing is taken from the selection on the Bach Cantatas Website.

- Bach Made in Germany Vol. 1 – Cantatas VI, Günther Ramin, Thomanerchor, Gewandhausorchester, Eva Fleischer, Gert Lutze, Hans Hauptmann, Leipzig Classics 1952
- J. S. Bach: Das Kantatenwerk – Sacred Cantatas Vol. 2, Nikolaus Harnoncourt, Wiener Sängerknaben & Chorus Viennensis, Concentus Musicus Wien, Paul Esswood, Kurt Equiluz, Max van Egmond, Teldec 1973
- Bach Cantatas Vol. 3 – Ascension Day, Whitsun, Trinity, Karl Richter, Münchener Bach-Chor, Münchener Bach-Orchester, Anna Reynolds, Peter Schreier, Dietrich Fischer-Dieskau, Archiv Produktion 1975
- Die Bach Kantate Vol. 41, Helmuth Rilling, Gächinger Kantorei, Bach-Collegium Stuttgart, Arleen Augér, Helen Watts, Adalbert Kraus, Wolfgang Schöne, Hänssler 1978
- J. S. Bach: Complete Cantatas Vol. 7, Ton Koopman, Amsterdam Baroque Orchestra & Choir, Bogna Bartosz, Gerd Türk, Klaus Mertens, Antoine Marchand 1997
- J. S. Bach: Cantatas Vol. 9 – Leipzig Cantatas, Masaaki Suzuki, Bach Collegium Japan, Robin Blaze, Gerd Türk, Chiyuki Urano, BIS 1998
- Bach Cantatas Vol. 3: Tewkesbury/Mühlhausen, John Eliot Gardiner, Monteverdi Choir, English Baroque Soloists, Nathalie Stutzmann, Paul Agnew, Nicolas Testé, Soli Deo Gloria 2000
- Bach Edition Vol. 21 – Cantatas Vol. 12, Pieter Jan Leusink, Holland Boys Choir, Netherlands Bach Collegium, Sytse Buwalda, Marcel Beekman, Bas Ramselaar, Brilliant Classics 2000
