= In allen meinen Taten, BWV 97 =

Chorale cantata by Johann Sebastian Bach

In allen meinen Taten (In all that I do / In all my undertakings), BWV 97, (Note: "BWV" is Bach-Werke-Verzeichnis, a thematic catalogue of Bach's works.) is a church cantata by Johann Sebastian Bach. He composed the chorale cantata in Leipzig in 1734 for an unspecified occasion. The text consists of the unchanged words of the hymn by Paul Fleming (1642).

== History and words ==
Bach wrote the chorale cantata in 1734, about a decade after his annual cycle of cantatas, in the same year as his Christmas Oratorio, one year after Kyrie and Gloria of his later Mass in B minor. He dated the manuscript himself, but the occasion is unspecified. The work may have originally been composed for a wedding, because the score shows on top of movement 7 the crossed-out words "nach der Trauung" (after the wedding). A later copy mentions the fifth Sunday after Trinity. The text consists of nine unchanged stanzas of the chorale by Paul Fleming, published in 1642. The six lines of each stanza rhyme in pairs: 1 and 2, 4 and 5, 3 and 6. The text was written in 1633 at the outset of a "long and hazardous journey" to Moscow and reflects a "beginning in God's name". Bach structured nine stanzas in as many movements, framing a sequence of arias and recitatives by an opening chorus and a closing chorale. At least two later performances between 1735 and 1747 are documented.

== Scoring and structure ==
The cantata is scored for four vocal soloists (soprano, alto, tenor, and bass), a four-part choir, two oboes, bassoon, two violins, viola, and basso continuo.

1. Chorus: In allen meinen Taten
2. Aria (bass): Nichts ist es spät und frühe
3. Recitative (tenor): Es kann mir nichts geschehen
4. Aria (tenor): Ich traue seiner Gnaden
5. Recitative (alto): Er wolle meiner Sünden
6. Aria (alto): Leg ich mich späte nieder
7. Duet aria (soprano, bass): Hat er es denn beschlossen
8. Aria (soprano): Ich hab mich ihm ergeben
9. Chorale: So sei nun, Seele, deine

== Music ==
In the two choral movements, Bach used the melody of the hymn, but composed music unrelated to the melody in the other cantata movements. The poet wrote the words to fit the well-known tune of "Innsbruck, ich muß dich lassen" by Heinrich Isaac. Bach had used it twice in his St Matthew Passion, in movements 10 (Ich bin's, ich sollte büßen) and 37 (Wer hat dich so geschlagen).

In keeping with a beginning, Bach set the opening chorale fantasia in the style of a French overture, in a sequence slow – fast (fugue), as he had done already as early as in 1714 in Nun komm, der Heiden Heiland, BWV 61, beginning a new liturgical year. The slow section, marked grave, in dotted rhythm is instrumental, in the fast section, marked vivace, the orchestra plays a fugue, to which the soprano sings the cantus firmus of the melody line by line in long notes, whereas the lower voices take part in the imitation of the instrumental motifs. After the last line all voices join in an "urgent homophonic concluding statement".

Bach structured the inner movements, named "versus" (Latin for stanza), as five arias and two recitatives, using the voices from the lowest to the highest, increasing the instrumentation from continuo to obbligato instruments. He kept the structure of the text, two even parts, in all of these movements but the duet which shows a modified da capo form. The recitatives are kept simple, the first (versus 3) is secco, the second (versus 5) is accompanied by the strings. Versus 2 is introduced by a ritornello of the continuo on a theme which the bass picks up. Versus 4 ("Ich traue seiner Gnaden") (I trust His grace) is brightened by a virtuoso violin part, possibly as an image of God's grace. John Eliot Gardiner compares the writing for the violin to that in his sonatas and partitas for solo violin. The strings open versus 6 with motifs illustrating rest and motion, which is obvious when the alto sings: "Leg ich mich späte nieder" (Late do I lie me down), "erwache" (wake up), "lieg oder ziehe fort" (lie still or go forth). Versus 7 is set as a duet with continuo. The ritornello begins with a theme later also used by the voices and ends on a characteristic motif illustrating the resolution of "... then will I uncomplaining unto my fate press on". In the last aria the oboes support the soprano singing in extended melismas "I have surrendered myself to Him".

In the closing chorale, the strings play three independent parts in addition to the four vocal parts, while the oboes play the choral melody, termed "augmenting the luminescent harmony" by Gardiner. Called by Dürr "hymnische Krönung" (hymnal crowning), the movement balances the first movement and adds weight to the summarising text of the final stanza, "To thee be true, o spirit, and trust in Him alone now who hath created thee".

== Selected recordings ==
- Amsterdam Baroque Orchestra & Choir, Ton Koopman. J.S. Bach: Complete Cantatas Vol. 21. Antoine Marchand 2002.
- Gächinger Kantorei / Bach-Collegium Stuttgart, Helmuth Rilling. Die Bach Kantate Vol. 69. Hänssler 1974.
- Holland Boys Choir / Netherlands Bach Collegium, Pieter Jan Leusink. Bach Edition Vol. 9 – Cantatas Vol. 1. Brilliant Classics 1999.
- Monteverdi Choir / English Baroque Soloists, John Eliot Gardiner. Bach Cantatas Vol. 25: Dresden/Sherborne. Soli Deo Gloria 2000.
- Tölzer Knabenchor / Concentus Musicus Wien, Nikolaus Harnoncourt. J.S. Bach: Das Kantatenwerk – Sacred Cantatas Vol. 5. Teldec 1979.
