= Paul Fleming (poet) =

German physician and poet (1609–1640)

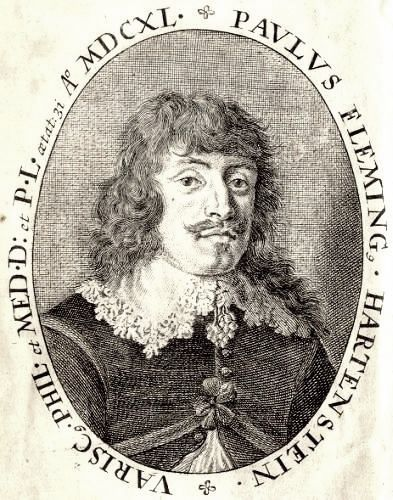
- Born: 5 October 1609; Hartenstein, Holy Roman Empire
- Died: 2 April 1640 (aged 30); Hamburg, Holy Roman Empire
- Other name: Paul Flemming
- Education: St. Thomas School, Leipzig; Leipzig University
- Occupations: Physician; poet

Paul Fleming (also spelt Flemming; 5 October 1609 – 2 April 1640) was a German physician and poet.

As well as writing notable verse and hymns, he spent several years accompanying the Duke of Holstein's embassies to Russia and Persia. He also lived for a year at Reval on the coast of Estonia, where he wrote many love-songs.

== Life ==
Born at Hartenstein, Saxony, the son of Abraham Fleming, a well-to-do Lutheran pastor, Fleming received his early education from his father before attending a school at Mittweida and then the famous St. Thomas School at Leipzig. He received his initial medical training at Leipzig University, where he also studied literature and graduated as a Doctor of Philosophy before gaining his medical doctorate at the University of Hamburg.

The Thirty Years' War drove Fleming to Holstein, where in 1633 Frederick III, Duke of Holstein-Gottorp, engaged him as physician, courtier and steward. Towards the end of 1633 the Duke sent Fleming with Adam Olearius as a member of an embassy to Russia and the Persian Empire headed by Otto Brüggemann and Philipp Crusius. Fleming was outside Germany for almost six years, much of them in the two foreign empires. Travelling into Russia, Fleming was in an advance party of the embassy which went to Novgorod, where he remained while negotiations went on with the Swedes and the Russians. At the end of July 1634 the ambassadors joined the party, and the embassy proceeded to Moscow, arriving on 14 August. After four months in the capital city, the Holstein embassy departed again for the Baltic on Christmas Eve, 1634, and on 10 January 1635 arrived at Reval (now Tallinn) in Swedish Estonia. While the ambassadors continued to Gottorp some of the party, including Fleming, remained in Reval. In the event, Fleming was there for about a year, during which he organized a poetry circle called "the Shepherds". Not long after his arrival in Reval, Fleming began his courtship of Elsabe Niehus, the daughter of Heinrich Niehus, a merchant originally from Hamburg. He wrote love poems for her, and they became engaged to be married. In 1636 the embassy proceeded to Persia, by way of a further visit to Moscow, and Elsabe was left behind. Fleming's Epistolae ex Persia were four letters in verse written during his time in Persia, between 1636 and 1638. The embassy was at Isfahan in 1637. On returning to Reval, Fleming found that Elsabe had married another man and became engaged to her sister, Anna Niehus.

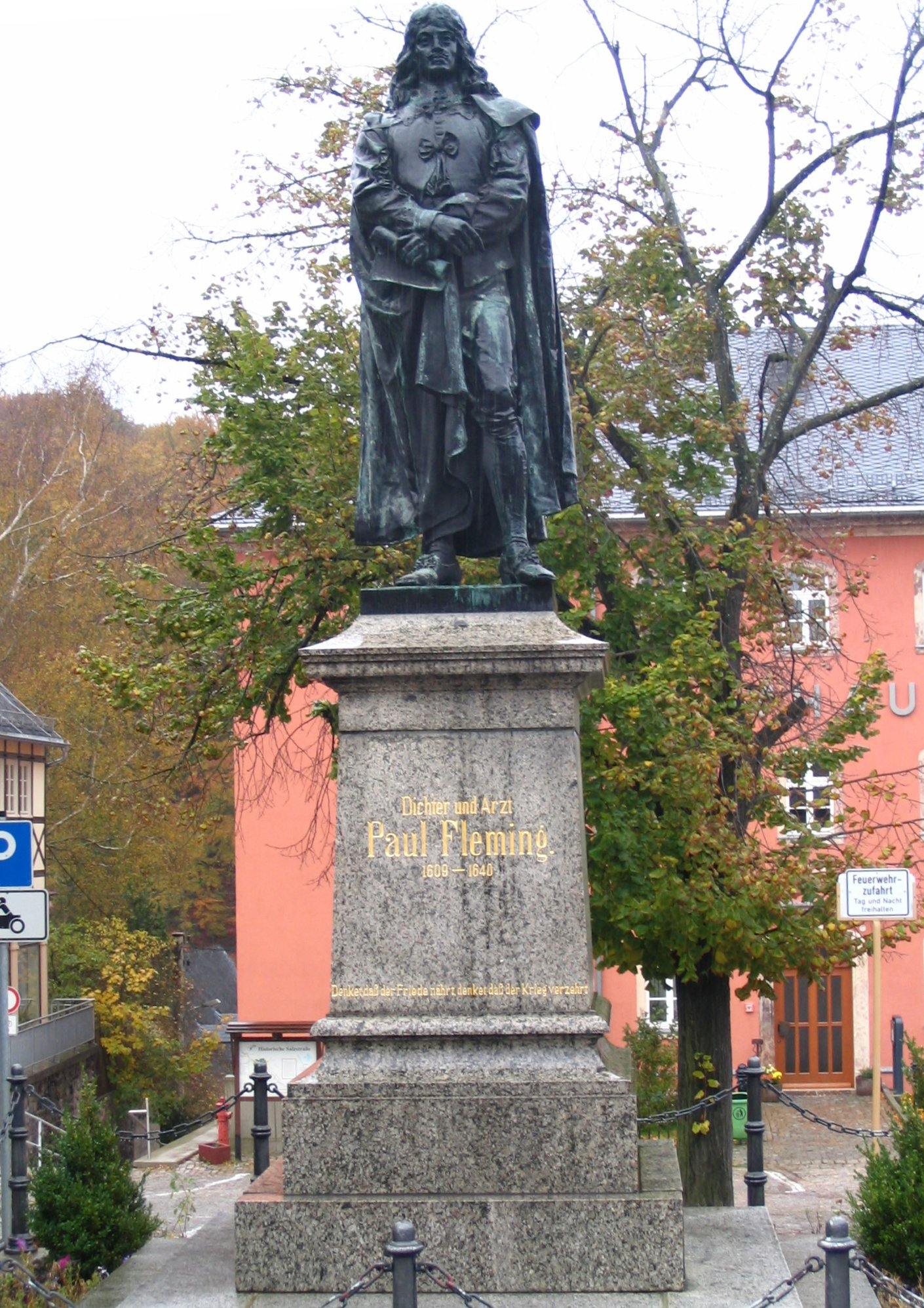
Statue of Fleming at Hartenstein

In 1639 Fleming resumed his medical studies at the University of Leiden, and in 1640 was awarded a doctorate. He settled in Hamburg, where he died on 2 April 1640.

== Poetry ==
With his contemporaries Martin Opitz (1597–1639), Andreas Gryphius (1616–1664), Christian Hoffmann von Hoffmannswaldau (1616–1679) and the rather later Daniel Casper von Lohenstein (1635–1683), Fleming is one of the writers now called "the Silesian poets" or "the Silesian school". As a lyricist he stands in the front rank of German poets.

Fleming's well-known poems include Auf den Tod eines Kindes (On the Death of a Child) and Madrigal. A number of his sonnets are about the places he visited in his travels. The only collections published in his lifetime were Rubella seu Suaviorum Liber (1631) and Klagegedichte über das unschuldigste Leiden und Tod unsers Erlösers Jesu Christi (Laments concerning the most innocent Suffering and Death of our Saviour Jesus Christ), printed early in 1632, the second of which begins with an invocation of Melpomene, the Muse of tragedy. His Teutsche Poemata (Poems in German), published posthumously in 1642, was later renamed Geistliche und weltliche Gedichte (Spiritual and Secular Poems) and contains many notable love-songs.

Fleming wrote in Latin as well as in German, and his Latin poems were published in a single volume in 1863, edited by Johann Martin Lappenberg. Fleming has been called a man of "real poetic genius", "the only good poet in Germany during the Thirty Years' War", "possibly the greatest German lyric poet of the seventeenth century" and "the German Herrick". Günter Grass has called him "one of the major figures in German seventeenth-century literature".

=== Musical settings ===
Fleming wrote the hymn in nine stanzas "In allen meinen Taten" (In all that I do) on the melody of "Innsbruck, ich muss dich lassen" by Heinrich Isaac, which is contained in several hymnals. Johann Sebastian Bach used the final stanza to close both cantatas Meine Seufzer, meine Tränen (BWV 13) and Sie werden euch in den Bann tun (BWV 44). The complete hymn is the base for Bach's chorale cantata In allen meinen Taten (BWV 97). Already in the 17th century another composer, David Pohle (1624–1695), had set twelve of Fleming's love-songs to music. Johannes Brahms set "Lass dich nur nichts bedauern" as Geistliches Lied, Op. 30. Pauline Volkstein also set Fleming's texts to music.

== Works ==
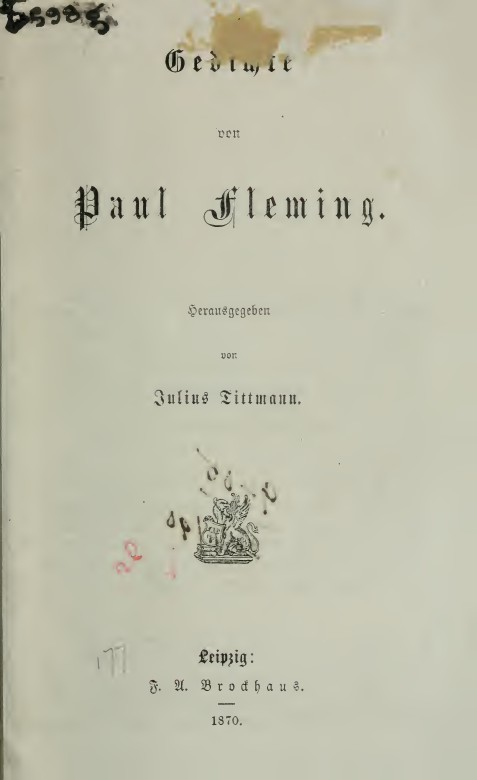
Gedichte (1870)

- Rubella seu Suaviorum Liber (1631)
- Klagegedichte über das unschüldigste Leiden undt Tod unsers Erlösers Jesu Christi (Laments concerning the most innocent Suffering and Death of our Saviour Jesus Christ) (1632)
- Prodromus (1641)
- Teutsche Poemata (Poems in German) (1646)
  - Geistliche und weltliche Gedichte (Spiritual and Secular Poems) was the title of later editions of Teutsche Poemata

Source: "Paul Fleming (1609–1640)". Die Barockepoche im Spiegel der Lyrik (in German). University of Konstanz. Archived from the original (PDF) on 6 September 2023.

== Bibliography ==
- Harry Mayne, Paul Fleming (1609–1640) (1909)
- Herbert William Smith, The forms of praise in the German poetry of Paul Fleming (1609–1640) (1956)
- Siegfried Scheer, Paul Fleming 1609 – 1640: seine literar-historischen Nachwirkungen in drei Jahrhunderten (1941)
- Karen Brand, Diversität der deutschen Liebeslyrik von Paul Fleming (2010)
- Gerhard Dünnhaupt: 'Paul Fleming', in Personalbibliographien zu den Drucken des Barock, vol. 2 (Stuttgart: Hiersemann, 1990; ISBN 3-7772-9027-0), pp. 1490–1513
- Eva Dürrenfeld, Paul Fleming und Johann Christian Günther (Tübingen: Winter, 1964)
- Heinz Entner, Paul Fleming – Ein deutscher Dichter im Dreißigjährigen Krieg (Leipzig: Verlag Philipp Reclam jun. 1989; ISBN 3-379-00486-3)
- Maria Cäcilie Pohl, Paul Fleming. Ich-Darstellung, Übersetzungen, Reisegedichte (Münster & Hamburg, 1993)
- Hans Pyritz, Paul Flemings Liebeslyrik (Göttingen: Vandenhoeck & Ruprecht, 1962)
- Konrad Müller, Paul Fleming und das Haus Schönburg (Waldenburg, Saxony: 1939)
- Theodor Kolde (1877). "Fleming, Paul" . Allgemeine Deutsche Biographie (in German). Vol. 7. Leipzig: Duncker & Humblot. pp. 115–117.
- Willi Flemming (1961). "Flem(m)ing, Paul". Neue Deutsche Biographie (in German). Vol. 5. Berlin: Duncker & Humblot. pp. 238–239.
