= Chorale cantata (Bach) =

Cantatas by J. S. Bach that are based on a single hymn

There are 52 chorale cantatas by Johann Sebastian Bach surviving in at least one complete version. Around 40 of these were composed during his second year as Thomaskantor in Leipzig, which started after Trinity Sunday 4 June 1724, and form the backbone of his chorale cantata cycle. The eldest known cantata by Bach, an early version of Christ lag in Todes Banden, BWV 4, presumably written in 1707, was a chorale cantata. The last chorale cantata he wrote in his second year in Leipzig was Wie schön leuchtet der Morgenstern, BWV 1, first performed on Palm Sunday, 25 March 1725. In the ten years after that he wrote at least a dozen further chorale cantatas and other cantatas that were added to his chorale cantata cycle.

Lutheran hymns, also known as chorales, have a prominent place in the liturgy of the church. A chorale cantata is a church cantata based on a single hymn, both its text and tune. Bach was not the first to compose them, but for his 1724-25 second Leipzig cantata cycle he developed a specific format: in this format the opening movement is a chorale fantasia on the first stanza of the hymn, with the hymn tune appearing as a cantus firmus. The last movement is a four-part harmonisation of the chorale tune for the choir, with the last stanza of the hymn as text. While the text of the stanzas used for the outer movements was retained unchanged, the text of the inner movements of the cantata, a succession of recitatives alternating with arias, was paraphrased from the inner stanzas of the hymn.

== Context ==
Martin Luther advocated the use of vernacular hymns during services. He wrote several himself, also worked on their tunes, and helped publish the first Lutheran hymnal, the Achtliederbuch, containing four of his hymns, in 1524.

Leipzig had a strong tradition of sacred hymns. In 1690, the minister of the Thomaskirche, Johann Benedikt Carpzov, had announced that he would preach not only on the Gospel but also on a related "good, beautiful, old, evangelical and Lutheran hymn", and that Johann Schelle, then the director of music, would perform the hymn before the sermon.

Bach's duties as an organist included accompanying congregational singing, and he was familiar with the Lutheran hymns. Some of Bach's earliest church cantatas include chorale settings, although he usually incorporates them into just one or two movements. Hymn stanzas are most typically included in his cantatas as the closing four-part chorale. In his passions, Bach used chorale settings to complete a scene.

Before Bach chorale cantatas, that is, cantatas entirely based on both the text and the melody of a single Lutheran hymn, had been composed by among others Samuel Scheidt, Johann Erasmus Kindermann, Johann Pachelbel and Dieterich Buxtehude. Sebastian Knüpfer, Johann Schelle and Johann Kuhnau, Bach's predecessors as Thomaskantor, had composed them. Contemporary to Bach, Christoph Graupner and Georg Philipp Telemann were composers of chorale cantatas.

From his appointment as Thomaskantor in Leipzig end of May 1723 to Trinity Sunday a year later Bach had been presenting the church cantatas for each Sunday and holiday of the liturgical year, his first annual cycle of cantatas. His ensuing second cycle started with a stretch of at least 40 new chorale cantatas, up to Palm Sunday of 1725. A week later, for Easter, he presented a revised version of the early Christ lag in Todes Banden chorale cantata.

== Bach's chorale cantatas ==
The oldest known chorale cantate by Bach, which may well have been the first cantata he composed, was likely composed in 1707 for a presentation in Mühlhausen. All further extant chorale cantatas were composed in Leipzig. There Bach started composing chorale cantatas as part of his second cantata cycle in 1724, a year after having been appointed as Thomaskantor. Up to at least 1735 he amended that cycle transforming it into what is known as his chorale cantata cycle. With its 52 extant cantatas for known occasions, out of 64 for a full cantata cycle in a city like Leipzig where during the largest part of advent and lent a silent time was observed, the cycle however remains incomplete.

Possibly the inspiration for starting a chorale cantata cycle in 1724 is linked to it being exactly two centuries after the publication of the first Lutheran hymnals. The first of these early hymnals is the Achtliederbuch, containing eight hymns and five melodies. Four chorale cantatas use text and/or melody of a hymn in that early publication (BWV 2, 9, 38 and 117). Another 1524 hymnal is the Erfurt Enchiridion: BWV 62, 91, 96, 114, 121 and 178 are based on hymns from that publication. BWV 14, and 125 were based on hymns from Eyn geystlich Gesangk Buchleyn, also published in 1524.

The usual format of Bach's chorale cantatas is:

- First movement (or, when the cantata starts with an instrumental sinfonia, the first movement with vocalists): choral movement, usually a chorale fantasia, that takes its text unmodified from the first stanza of the Lutheran hymn on which the cantata is based. In this movement the chorale melody most often appears as a cantus firmus in the soprano part.
- Inner movements: usually three to five movements which are recitatives alternating with arias, based on the inner stanzas of the hymn. For the chorale cantatas Bach premiered from 11 June 1724 to 25 March 1725 the text of these inner movements is almost always a rephrasing, by an unknown author, of the hymn's inner stanzas. For chorale cantatas composed before and after that period Bach often uses unmodified hymn text for the inner movements of his chorale cantatas. When the text of all stanzas of the hymn is used unmodified that is called per omnes versus.
- Last movement: four-part homophonic setting for SATB voices of the hymn tune, taking the unmodified last stanza of the hymn as text.

In Bach's time the congregation would have sung during some of the services in which the cantatas were performed, but it is not known whether the congregation would have joined the choir in singing the chorales in the cantatas themselves. On the other hand, although Bach's chorale arrangements can be tricky for amateur singers, sometimes in 21st-century performances of the cantatas and passions audience participation is encouraged. For example, the Monteverdi Choir encouraged audience participation in a 2013 performance of the Christ lag in Todes Banden cantata.

Legend to the sortable table
column		content
1	BG	The numbers refer to the 44 cantatas that survived the 18th century as performance parts kept in Leipzig: the list follows Dörffel in the 27th volume of the Bach Gesellschaft (BG) publication.
2	K (basic order)	K numbers of the chronological Zwang catalogue for Bach's cantatas: this catalogue keeps the bulk of the chorale cantatas together in the range K 74–114. This catalogue places the Reformation Day cantata Ein feste Burg ist unser Gott, for 31 October, between the chorale cantatas for Trinity XXI and for Trinity XXII in 1724, instead of a few years later as most other scholars do.
3	BWV	Number of the cantata in the Bach-Werke-Verzeichnis (Bach works catalogue)
4	cantata	Name of the cantata, by incipit (in German). Links go to the separate article on the cantata.
5	occasion	Indicates for which occasion in the liturgical year Bach's church cantata was written.
6	BD	Bach Digital (BD): this column contains external links to the "Bach Digital Work" pages on the cantatas at the bach-digital.de website. Such webpages contain links to various primary sources, including early manuscripts (e.g. Bach's autographs when extant), and the cantata text. Not listed as chorale cantatas at that website: BWV 58, 68 and 128: not chorale cantatas in a strict sense, nonetheless belonging to the chorale cantata cycle.; BWV 192: incomplete cantata, the three extant parts of which are however based on the same hymn
7	date	Date(s) of the first and/or other early stagings of the cantata. Links go to chronological entries in the list below
8	hymn	Indicates the Lutheran hymn on which the cantata is based, represented by the hymn's Zahn number when available (some hymns have more than one melody associated with it, the Zahn number is a unique identification of the Hymn tune used in the cantata). A few minor spelling variations aside, the name of the hymn is identical to the name of the cantata given in column 4. Links go to the article on the hymn.
9	year	Year associated with the hymn, typically the year of first publication. A horizontal line separates the year associated with the hymn's text from the year associated with the hymn's melody (if different). Links go to entries in the list below that add details about the hymn.
10	text by tune by	Author of the hymn text and composer of the hymn melody, separated by a horizontal line (if different). Links go to articles on the author and/or composer of the hymn.

Background colors
Color	Signifies
yellow	The libretto of the cantata consists exclusively of unmodified hymn text
orange-brown	Not a chorale cantata in the strict sense, but seen as part of the cycle

Bach's chorale cantatas
BG	K	BWV	cantata	occasion	date	BD	hymn	year	text by tune by
17	4	4	Christ lag in Todes Banden	Easter	24 Apr 1707; 8 Apr 1708; 9 Apr 1724; 1 Apr 1725	00004; 00005	7012a	1524	Luther
21	74	20	O Ewigkeit, du Donnerwort	Trinity I	11 Jun 1724	00023	5820	1642 1642/1653	Rist Schop/Crüger
22	75	2	Ach Gott, vom Himmel sieh darein	Trinity II	18 Jun 1724	00002	4431	1524 (Note: No. 5 in Achtliederbuch)	Luther
23	76	7	Christ unser Herr zum Jordan kam	St. John's Day	24 Jun 1724	00008	7246	1541	Luther Walter?
	77	135	Ach Herr, mich armen Sünder	Trinity III	25 Jun 1724	00167	5385a (Note: melody of "O Haupt voll Blut und Wunden")	1597	Schneegass Hassler
27	78	10	Meine Seel erhebt den Herren	Visitation	2 Jul 1724	00012	German; Magnificat	1522	Luther (Note: text in Luther Bible) Luther? (Note: tonus peregrinus)
25	79	93	Wer nur den lieben Gott läßt walten	Trinity V	9 Jul 1724	00118	2778	1657	Neumark
28	80	107	Was willst du dich betrüben	Trinity VII	23 Jul 1724	00132	5264b	1630	Heermann
29	81	178	Wo Gott der Herr nicht bei uns hält	Trinity VIII	30 Jul 1724	00216	4441a (Note: text of 6 (of 8) verses kept)	1524 (Note: No. 14 in Erfurt Enchiridion)	Jonas
30	82	94	Was frag ich nach der Welt	Trinity IX	6 Aug 1724	00119	5206b	1664	Kindermann Fritsch
31	83	101	Nimm von uns, Herr, du treuer Gott	Trinity X	13 Aug 1724	00126	2561 (Note: melody of "Vater unser im Himmelreich")	1584	Moller Luther?
	84	113	Herr Jesu Christ, du höchstes Gut	Trinity XI	20 Aug 1724	00138	4486	1588	Ringwaldt
33	85	33	Allein zu dir, Herr Jesu Christ	Trinity XIII	3 Sep 1724	00043	7292b	1540 1512	Hubert Hofhaimer
34	86	78	Jesu, der du meine Seele	Trinity XIV	10 Sep 1724	00097	6804	1642	Rist
35	87	99	Was Gott tut, das ist wohlgetan	Trinity XV	17 Sep 1724	00124	5629	1674	Rodigast Gastorius (Note: based on Werner Fabricius)
36	88	8	Liebster Gott, wenn werd ich sterben?	Trinity XVI	24 Sep 1724 (Note: first version in E major); 17 Sep 1747 (Note: second version in D major)	00009; 00010	6634	c. 1690 bef. 1697	Neumann Vetter
	89	130	Herr Gott, dich loben alle wir	St. Michael's Day	29 Sep 1724 and later	00158; 00159	368 (Note: melody Old 100th)	1554	Eber Bourgeois
37	90	114	Ach, lieben Christen, seid getrost	Trinity XVII	1 Oct 1724	00139	4441a (Note: melody of "Wo Gott der Herr nicht bei uns hält")	1561 1524 (Note: No. 14 in Erfurt Enchiridion)	Gigas
38	91	96	Herr Christ, der einge Gottessohn	Trinity XVIII	8 Oct 1724	00121	4297a (Note: melody of secular "Mein Freud möcht sich wohl mehren")	1524 (Note: No. 10 in Erfurt Enchiridion) 1455	Cruciger
39	92	5	Wo soll ich fliehen hin	Trinity XIX	15 Oct 1724	00006	2177	1630	Heermann
	93	180	Schmücke dich, o liebe Seele	Trinity XX	22 Oct 1724	00218	6923	1649	Franck, J.
40	94	38	Aus tiefer Not schrei ich zu dir	Trinity XXI	29 Oct 1724	00053	4437	1524 (Note: No. 7 in Achtliederbuch)	Luther
	95	80b 80	Ein feste Burg ist unser Gott	Reformation Day	1723 or later 1727 or later	00101; 00099	7377	c.1529	Luther
	96	115	Mache dich, mein Geist, bereit	Trinity XXII	5 Nov 1724	00140	6274a (Note: melody of "Straf mich nicht in deinem Zorn")	1695	Freystein
41	97	139	Wohl dem, der sich auf seinen Gott	Trinity XXIII	12 Nov 1724	00171	2383	1692	Rube
42	98	26	Ach wie flüchtig, ach wie nichtig	Trinity XXIV	19 Nov 1724	00033	1887b	1652	Franck, M. Crüger
43	99	116	Du Friedefürst, Herr Jesu Christ	Trinity XXV	26 Nov 1724	00141	4373	1601	Ebert
1	100	62	Nun komm, der Heiden Heiland	Advent I	3 Dec 1724	00078	1174	1524 (Note: No. 23 in Erfurt Enchiridion)	Luther
2	101	91	Gelobet seist du, Jesu Christ	Christmas	25 Dec 1724 and later	00116; 00115	1947	1524 (Note: No. 8 in Erfurt Enchiridion)	Luther
3	102	121	Christum wir sollen loben schon	Christmas 2	26 Dec 1724	00148	297c	1524 (Note: No. 23 in Erfurt Enchiridion)	Luther
4	103	133	Ich freue mich in dir	Christmas 3	27 Dec 1724	00163	5187	1697	Ziegler
5	104	122	Das neugeborne Kindelein	Christmas I	31 Dec 1724	00149	491	1597	Schneegass
6	105	41	Jesu, nun sei gepreiset	New Year	1 Jan 1725	00056	8477a	1539	Hermann
8	106	123	Liebster Immanuel, Herzog der Frommen	Epiphany	6 Jan 1725	00150	4932c	1679	Fritsch
9	107	124	Meinen Jesum laß ich nicht	Epiphany I	7 Jan 1725	00151	3449	1658	Keymann Hammerschmidt
10	108	3	Ach Gott, wie manches Herzeleid	Epiphany II	14 Jan 1725	00003	533a	1587 1455 (Note: Melody of "Herr Jesu Christ, meins Lebens Licht" in Lochamer-Liederbuch)	Moller
	109	111	Was mein Gott will, das g'scheh allzeit	Epiphany III	21 Jan 1725	00136	7568	1547; 1555 (Note: fourth and final stanza, anonymous) 1528 (Note: chanson "Il me suffit de tous mes maulx")	Albert of Prussia de Sermisy
13	110	92	Ich hab in Gottes Herz und Sinn	Septuagesimae	28 Jan 1725	00117	7568	1647 1528	Gerhardt de Sermisy
12	111	125	Mit Fried und Freud ich fahr dahin	Purification	2 Feb 1725	00152	3986 (Note: German Nunc dimittis)	1524 (Note: in Eyn geystlich Gesangk Buchleyn)	Luther
14	112	126	Erhalt uns, Herr, bei deinem Wort	Sexagesimae	4 Feb 1725	00153	350	1541	Luther & Jonas
15	113	127	Herr Jesu Christ, wahr' Mensch und Gott	Estomihi	11 Feb 1725	00154	2570	1557 1551 (Note: melody of "Wenn einer schon ein Haus aufbaut" in Genevan Psalter (1551 edition))	Eber Bourgeois?
16	114	1	Wie schön leuchtet der Morgenstern	Annunciation; Palm Sunday (Note: Annunciation and Palm Sunday coincided in 1725)	25 Mar 1725	00001	8359	1599	Nicolai
	122	128	Auf Christi Himmelfahrt allein	Ascension	10 May 1725	00156	4457 (Note: not based on a chorale, but beginning with a chorale fantasia)	1661	Sonnemann
19	125	68	Also hat Gott die Welt geliebt (Note: beginning and ending with a chorale fantasia, each on a different hymn (both with the same hymn tune))	Pentecost 2	21 May 1725	00085	5920	1675	Liscow Vopelius
		deest	Ich ruf zu dir, Herr Jesu Christ (Note: music lost, possibly composed by Telemann or, alternatively, an early version of BWV 177 (see BD 00215); this cantata's libretto, identical to that of BWV 177 (the 1732 cantata for Trinity IV in the chorale cantata cycle) was published as the text for a cantata performed on Trinity III, 17 June 1725 in Leipzig)	Trinity III	17 Jun 1725	01669	7400	1529?/31	Agricola
32	129	137	Lobe den Herren, den mächtigen König der Ehren	Trinity XII	19 Aug 1725	00169	1912a	1680	Neander
20	142	129	Gelobet sei der Herr, mein Gott	Trinity	8 Jun 1727	00157	5206b	1665	Olearius
7	161	58	Ach Gott, wie manches Herzeleid	New Year I	5 Jan 1727; 1733 or 1734	00074; 00073	533a	1587/1610 c.1455	Moller/Behm
	172	117	Sei Lob und Ehr dem höchsten Gut		1728–1731	00142	4430	1673 1524 (Note: melody of "Es ist das Heil uns kommen her", No. 2 in Achtliederbuch)	Schütz, J. J. Speratus
	181	192	Nun danket alle Gott		1730	00233	5142	1636(c.) 1647(c.)	Rinkart Crüger
18	182	112	Der Herr ist mein getreuer Hirt	Easter II	8 Apr 1731	00137	4457	1530	Meuslin Decius
44	184	140	Wachet auf, ruft uns die Stimme	Trinity XXVII	25 Nov 1731	00172	8405	1599	Nicolai
24	186	177	Ich ruf zu dir, Herr Jesu Christ	Trinity IV	6 Jul 1732 (Note: composed at a later date while in 1724 Visitation fell on the Sunday of Trinity IV)	00215	7400	1529?/31	Agricola
26	187	9	Es ist das Heil uns kommen her	Trinity VI	20 Jul 1732	00011	4430	1524 (Note: No. 2 in Achtliederbuch)	Speratus
	188	100	Was Gott tut, das ist wohlgetan		1732–1735	00125	5629	1674	Rodigast Gastorius (Note: based on Werner Fabricius)
	189	97	In allen meinen Taten	Trinity V?	25 Jul 1734?	00122	2293b	1633	Fleming
11	196	14	Wär Gott nicht mit uns diese Zeit	Epiphany IV	30 Jan 1735	00016	4434	1524 (Note: in Eyn geystlich Gesangk Buchleyn)	Luther

=== Easter 1707? ===
- 24 April 1707 (Easter): Christ lag in Todes Banden, BWV 4 (K 4), early version, assumed to have been presented in Mühlhausen. In that case it would be Bach's first documented cantata: the cantata is however only fully extant in its later versions. It was performed then as the test piece for the post of Organist at the Church Divi Blasii in that town. He repeated it on 8 April 1708.

=== Reformation Day 1723? ===
- 31 October 1723? (Reformation Day): Ein feste Burg ist unser Gott, BWV 80b (K 95), first Leipzig version, after Alles, was von Gott geboren, BWV 80a (not a chorale cantata but basis for BWV 80b), which had been performed on Oculi Sunday in Weimar in 1715 or 1716. There is however uncertainty when BWV 80b was first presented.

=== Easter 1724 ===
During his first year in Leipzig Bach presented a reworked version of his 1707 Easter cantata in Leipzig:

- 9 April 1724 (Easter): Christ lag in Todes Banden, BWV 4 (K 4), Leipzig version, first performance. Bach changed the last movement to reflect the current one (4-part Chorale setting). The first version (1707 & 1708) had the last verse (last movement) using the same music as the 1st verse (2nd movement).

=== First Sunday after Trinity 1724 to Easter 1725 ===
The first four chorale cantatas presented in 1724 appear to form a set: Bach gave the cantus firmus of the chorale tune to the soprano in the first, to the alto in the second, to the tenor in the third, and to the bass in the fourth. He varied the style of chorale fantasia in those four cantatas: French Overture in BWV 20, Chorale motet in BWV 2, Italian concerto in BWV 7, and vocal and instrumental counterpoint in BWV 135.

- 11 June 1724 (Trinity I): O Ewigkeit, du Donnerwort, BWV 20, based on Johann von Rist's "O Ewigkeit, du Donnerwort" which had appeared under the title "Eine sehr ernstliche und ausführliche Betrachtung der zukünftigen und unendlichen Ewigkeit" (a very serious and elaborate reflection on the impending and endless eternity) in 1642. The chorale melody had appeared in Johann Crüger's Praxis pietatis melica, 5th edition, in 1653, and was a modified version of Johann Schop's setting of "Wach auf, mein Geist, erhebe dich" (Johann Risten Himlische Lieder, 1641–42).
- 18 June 1724 (Trinity II): Ach Gott, vom Himmel sieh darein, BWV 2.
- 24 June 1724 (St. John's Day): Christ unser Herr zum Jordan kam, BWV 7 (K 76).
- 25 June 1724 (Trinity III): Ach Herr, mich armen Sünder, BWV 135 (K 77).
- 2 July 1724 (Visitation, that year also Trinity IV): Meine Seel erhebt den Herren, BWV 10 (K 78).
- 9 July 1724 (Trinity V): Wer nur den lieben Gott läßt walten, BWV 93 (K 79).
- 23 July 1724 (Trinity VII): Was willst du dich betrüben, BWV 107 (K 80).
- 30 July 1724 (Trinity VIII): Wo Gott der Herr nicht bei uns hält, BWV 178 (K 81).
- 6 August 1724 (Trinity IX): Was frag ich nach der Welt, BWV 94 (K 82).
- 13 August 1724 (Trinity X): Nimm von uns, Herr, du treuer Gott, BWV 101 (K 83).
- 20 August 1724 (Trinity XI): Herr Jesu Christ, du höchstes Gut, BWV 113 (K 84).
- 3 September 1724 (Trinity XIII): Allein zu dir, Herr Jesu Christ, BWV 33 (K 85).
- 10 September 1724 (Trinity XIV): Jesu, der du meine Seele, BWV 78 (K 86).
- 17 September 1724 (Trinity XV): Was Gott tut, das ist wohlgetan, BWV 99 (K 87).
- 24 September 1724 (Trinity XVI): Liebster Gott, wenn werd ich sterben? BWV 8 (K 88).
- 29 September 1724 (St. Michael's Day): Herr Gott, dich loben alle wir, BWV 130 (K 89).
- 1 October 1724 (Trinity XVII): Ach, lieben Christen, seid getrost, BWV 114 (K 90).
- 8 October 1724 (Trinity XVIII): Herr Christ, der einge Gottessohn, BWV 96 (K 91).
- 15 October 1724 (Trinity XIX): Wo soll ich fliehen hin, BWV 5 (K 92).
- 22 October 1724 (Trinity XX): Schmücke dich, o liebe Seele, BWV 180 (K 93).
- 29 October 1724 (Trinity XXI): Aus tiefer Not schrei ich zu dir, BWV 38 (K 94).
- 31 October 1724? (Reformation Day): Ein feste Burg ist unser Gott, BWV 80b (K 95) – there is however uncertainty whether an early version of BWV 80 was composed for, or even performed at, 31 October 1724.
- 5 November 1724 (Trinity XXII): Mache dich, mein Geist, bereit, BWV 115 (K 96).
- 12 November 1724 (Trinity XXIII): Wohl dem, der sich auf seinen Gott, BWV 139 (K 97).
- 19 November 1724 (Trinity XXIV): Ach wie flüchtig, ach wie nichtig, BWV 26 (K 98).
- 26 November 1724 (Trinity XXV): Du Friedefürst, Herr Jesu Christ, BWV 116 (K 99).
- 3 December 1724 (Advent I), : Nun komm, der Heiden Heiland, BWV 62 (K 100), based on Luther's "Nun komm, der Heiden Heiland" (Erfurt Enchiridion, 1524).
- 25 December 1724 (Christmas): Gelobet seist du, Jesu Christ, BWV 91 (K 101), based on Luther's "Gelobet seist du, Jesu Christ" (Eyn geystlich Gesangk Buchleyn, 1524).
- 26 December 1724 (Second Day of Christmas), : Christum wir sollen loben schon, BWV 121 (K 102), based on Luther's "Christum wir sollen loben schon" (Erfurt Enchiridion, 1524).
- 27 December 1724 (Third Day of Christmas): Ich freue mich in dir, BWV 133 (K 103), based on Caspar Ziegler's "Ich freue mich in dir" (1697).
- 31 December 1724 (Christmas I): Das neugeborne Kindelein, BWV 122 (K 104), based on Cyriakus Schneegass' "Das neugeborne Kindelein" (1597).
- 1 January 1725 (New Year): Jesu, nun sei gepreiset, BWV 41 (K 105), based on Johannes Hermann's "Jesu, nun sei gepreiset zu diesem neuen Jahr" (1593).
- 6 January 1725 (Epiphany): Liebster Immanuel, Herzog der Frommen, BWV 123 (K 106), based on Ahasverus Fritsch's "Liebster Immanuel, Herzog der Frommen" (1679).
- 7 January 1725 (Epiphany I): Meinen Jesum laß ich nicht, BWV 124 (K 107), based on Christian Keymann's "Meinen Jesum laß ich nicht", on a melody by Andreas Hammerschmidt (1658).
- 14 January 1725 (Epiphany II): Ach Gott, wie manches Herzeleid, BWV 3 (K 108), based on "Ach Gott, wie manches Herzeleid" (1679), attributed to Martin Moller and sung to the hymn tune of "Herr Jesu Christ, meins Lebens Licht" (Lochamer-Liederbuch, c.1455).
- 21 January 1725 (Epiphany III): Was mein Gott will, das g'scheh allzeit, BWV 111 (K 109), based on Albert, Duke of Prussia's "Was mein Gott will, gescheh allzeit" (1547, with a fourth and final stanza added in Nürnberg in 1555), on a melody by Claudin de Sermisy (chanson "Il me suffit de tous mes maulx", 1528, with an earlier contrafactum, on a Dutch text, in 1540).
- 28 January 1725 (Septuagesima): Ich hab in Gottes Herz und Sinn, BWV 92 (K 110), based on Paul Gerhardt's "Ich hab in Gottes Herz und Sinn" (1647), sung to the same melody by de Sermisy as the chorale Bach had used for the cantata he had presented a week earlier.
- 2 February 1725 (Purification): Mit Fried und Freud ich fahr dahin, BWV 125 (K 111), based on Luther's German Nunc dimittis "Mit Fried und Freud ich fahr dahin" (Eyn geystlich Gesangk Buchleyn, 1524).
- 4 February 1725 (Sexagesima): Erhalt uns, Herr, bei deinem Wort, BWV 126 (K 112), based on "Erhalt uns, Herr, bei deinem Wort" by Luther and Justus Jonas (1541).
- 11 February 1725 (Estomihi): Herr Jesu Christ, wahr' Mensch und Gott, BWV 127 (K 113), based on Paul Eber's "Herr Jesu Christ, wahr Mensch und Gott" (1557), sung to the melody of "Wenn einer schon ein Haus aufbaut" (Ambrosius Lobwasser's paraphrase of Psalm 127 published in Louis Bourgeois' 1551 edition of the Genevan Psalter).
- 25 March 1725 (Annunciation, that year coinciding with Palm Sunday): Wie schön leuchtet der Morgenstern, BWV 1 (K 114), based on Philipp Nicolai's "Wie schön leuchtet der Morgenstern" (1597, published 1599).
- 1 April 1725 (Easter): Christ lag in Todes Banden, BWV 4 (K 4), Leipzig version, second performance. The first version of this cantata had likely been composed 18 years earlier. Bach probably added 3 trombone parts only for this 1725 performance which is considered the final version of the cantata. It is a per omnes versus chorale cantata based on "Christ lag in Todes Banden", an Easter hymn by Luther and/or Johann Walter. The Medieval model for the text of this hymn and the melody is based on the old German hymn "Christ ist erstanden". The German hymn was published in 1524 in the Erfurt Enchiridion (under the title "Christ ist erstanden gebessert") as well as in Eyn geystlich Gesangk Buchleyn.

=== Ascension to Trinity 1725 ===
Two cantatas opening with a chorale fantasia usually grouped with the chorale cantatas

- 10 May 1725 (Ascension): Auf Christi Himmelfahrt allein, BWV 128
- 21 May 1725 (Pentecost Monday): Also hat Gott die Welt geliebt, BWV 68

=== Later additions to the chorale cantata cycle ===
After Trinity 1725 Bach added further cantatas to the chorale cantata cycle, at least up to 1735:

- 19 August 1725 (Trinity XII): Lobe den Herren, den mächtigen König der Ehren, BWV 137, a per omnes versus chorale cantata.
- 5 January 1727 (New Year I = Christmas II; there hadn't been a Sunday between New Year and Epiphany in 1725): Ach Gott, wie manches Herzeleid, BWV 58 (K 161), early version. This version is partly lost: the continuo part is all that is left from its middle movement. The other four movements are to a large extent identical to the 1730s version of this cantata (however without oboes in the outer movements).
- 129 (1727)
- 1727 or later (31 October, Reformation Day): Ein feste Burg ist unser Gott, BWV 80 (K 95), second Leipzig version. An early version of this cantata, BWV 80b, may have been composed or performed as early as 1723. The trumpet parts in the second Leipzig version were possibly a later addition by W. F. Bach. Luther's "Ein feste Burg ist unser Gott" (A Mighty Fortress Is Our God) was probably written and published in the late 1520s. Its oldest extant print is in Andrew Rauscher's 1531 hymnal.
- 112 (1731)
- 140 (1731)
- 177 (1732)
- 9 (1732)
- 4 January 1733 or 3 January 1734 (New Year I): Ach Gott, wie manches Herzeleid, BWV 58 (K 161), later version as published by the Bach Gesellschaft in Vol. 12^{2}, p. 133 ff. In this version a new composition replaces the third movement, and oboes are added in the outer movements. The cantata's libretto, by Christoph Birkmann, is not completely consistent with the chorale cantata format, but the cantata was certainly intended as an addition to the cycle. The cantata is unusual in combining the text of two hymns (Martin Moller's 1587 "Ach Gott, wie manches Herzeleid" and Martin Behm's 1610 "Herr Jesu Christ, meins Lebens Licht", both sung to the same 15th-century hymn tune), and in ending on a chorale fantasia instead of a four-part chorale. The hymn tune had first appeared in the Lochamer-Liederbuch (1451–1460). In a strict sense it is thus not a chorale cantata.
- 14 (1735)

=== Chorale cantatas with unknown liturgical function ===
For some chorale cantatas, written from 1728 to 1735, it is not known for which occasion they were written, and whether they were intended to belong to a cycle:

- 1728–31: Sei Lob und Ehr dem höchsten Gut, BWV 117
- 1730: Nun danket alle Gott, BWV 192 (incomplete)
- 1732–35: Was Gott tut, das ist wohlgetan, BWV 100
- 1734?: In allen meinen Taten, BWV 97
