= Music of Innsbruck =

Innsbruck is a city in the Austrian Alps whose musical heritage long played an important role in the music of Austria. Modern Innsbruck is home to the International Festival of Early Music (which features music from 1500 to 1750), an Eastern music festival, the Summer Dance Festival, the Innsbruck International Choral Festival and the Ambras Castle Concerts. Other major music venues include the Tiroler Landestheater ("Federal state-theatre of Tyrol").

== History ==
Innsbruck was the site of the first non-court opera house in Germanic lands, though it was funded mainly by the Archduke and provided with much of its repertoire by his court composer, the resident Italian Antonio Cesti. From 1654 to 1665, the company here produced several successful operas in the prevailing Venetian/pan-Italian style, some of which even later circulated in Italy.

The city is also known as the subject of 15th-century composer Heinrich Isaac's song Innsbruck, ich muss dich lassen, with a text about his sorrow at having to leave his post at court.
