= Johann Jacob Schütz =

German lawyer and hymnwriter

Johann Jakob Schütz (7 September 1640, Frankfurt – 22 May 1690, Frankfurt) was a German lawyer and hymnwriter. One of his hymns was reworked by Johann Sebastian Bach as a movement in BWV 117.
