= Wohl dem, der sich auf seinen Gott, BWV 139 =

Chorale cantata by Johann Sebastian Bach, 1724

Wohl dem, der sich auf seinen Gott
- BWV 139
- Chorale cantata by J. S. Bach
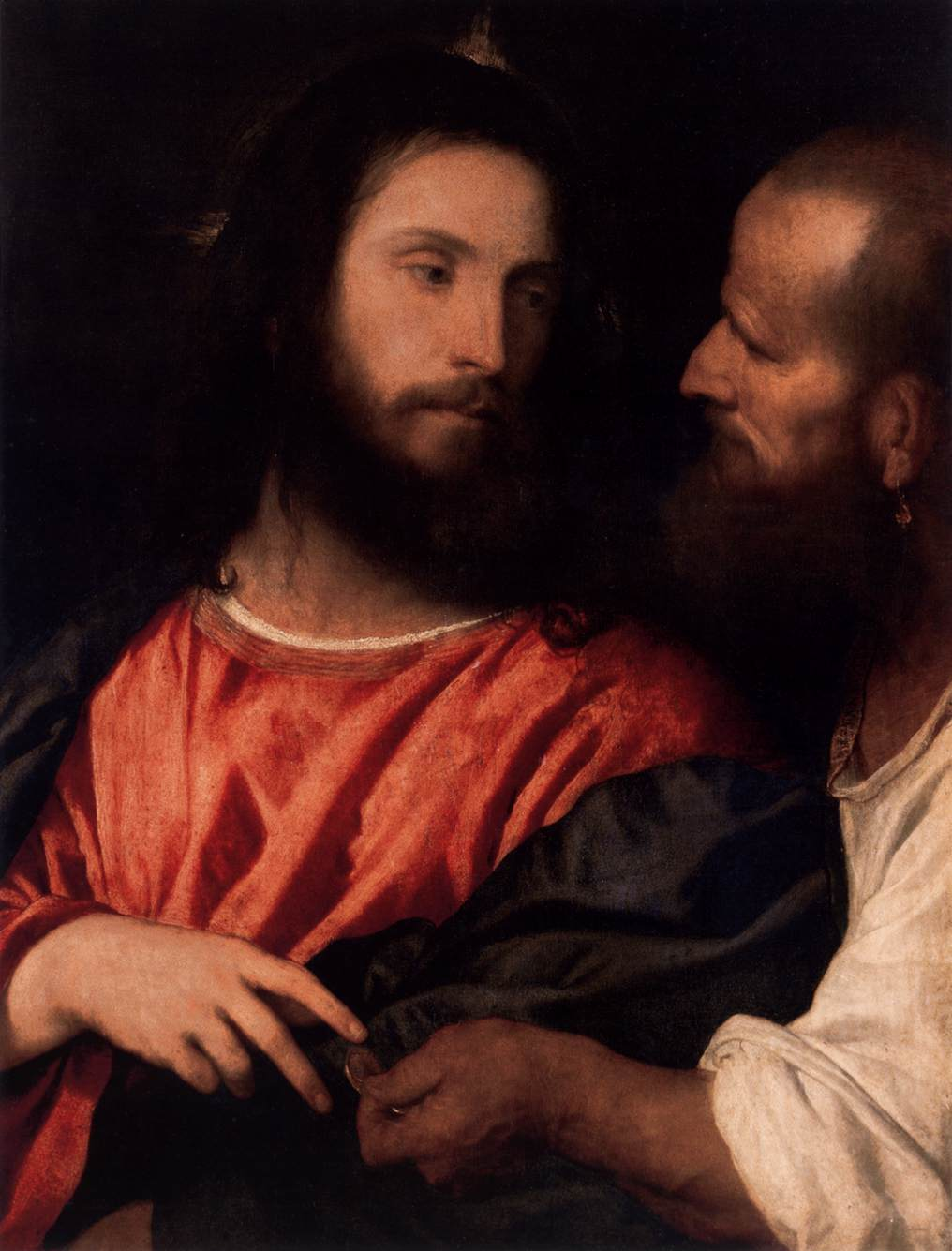
- The Tribute Money by Titian, depicting the Gospel reading
- Occasion: 23rd Sunday after Trinity
- Chorale: "Mache dich, mein Geist, bereit" by Johann Christoph Rube
- Performed: 12 November 1724: Leipzig
- Movements: 6
- Vocal: SATB choir and solo
- Instrumental: 2 oboes d'amore; 2 violins; viola; continuo

Johann Sebastian Bach composed the church cantata Wohl dem, der sich auf seinen Gott (Fortunate the person who upon his God), BWV 139, in Leipzig for the 23rd Sunday after Trinity and first performed it on 12 November 1724. It is based on the 1692 hymn of the same name in five stanzas by Johann Christoph Rube, which is sung to the 1628 tune of Johann Hermann Schein's "Machs mit mir, Gott, nach deiner Güt". The topic of this chorale is child-like trust in God in defiance of enemies and misfortune.

Wohl dem, der sich auf seinen Gott belongs to Bach's chorale cantata cycle, the second cycle during his tenure as Thomaskantor that began in 1723. An unknown librettist retained the outer stanzas of the chorale unchanged and paraphrased the inner stanzas into texts for alternating arias and recitatives. The outer choral movements use the hymn tune, the first in a chorale fantasia, and the last in a four-part chorale setting.

The cantata is scored for four vocal soloists, a four-part choir, and a Baroque instrumental ensemble of oboes d'amore, strings and basso continuo.

== History and words ==
Bach composed Wohl dem, der sich auf seinen Gott in his second year in Leipzig for the 23rd Sunday after Trinity. The prescribed readings for the Sunday were from the Epistle to the Philippians, "our conversation is in heaven" (Philippians 3:17–21), and from the Gospel of Matthew, the question about paying taxes, answered by Render unto Caesar... (Matthew 22:15–22). The cantata is based on the 1692 hymn in five stanzas by Johann Christoph Rube. It is sung to the melody of Johann Hermann Schein's "Machs mit mir, Gott, nach deiner Güt" (1628). An unknown poet retained the first and the last stanza as the cantata's outer movements. He derived the four inner movements as a sequence of alternating arias and recitatives from the inner stanzas, deriving the second movement from stanza two, inserting movement three taken from the Gospel reading, and paraphrasing stanzas three and four into the fourth and fifth movements. According to Hans-Joachim Schulze in Die Welt der Bach-Kantaten, Andreas Stübel, a former co-rector of the Thomasschule, is a likely author of Bach's chorale cantata texts; he had the necessary theological knowledge, and Bach stopped the cantata sequence soon after he died on 31 January 1725.

Bach led the Thomanerchor in the first performance of the cantata on 12 November 1724. He performed it again between 1732 and 1735, as a new organ part by Bach shows and again between 1744 and 1747.

== Music ==
=== Structure and scoring ===
Bach structured the cantata in six movements. Both the text and tune of the hymn are retained in the outer movements, a chorale fantasia and a four-part closing chorale. Bach scored the work for four vocal soloists (soprano (S), alto (A), tenor (T) and bass (B)), a four-part choir, and an intimate Baroque instrumental ensemble of two oboes d'amore (Oa), two violin parts (Vl), one viola part (Va), and basso continuo.

In the following table of the movements, the scoring, keys and time signatures are taken from Alfred Dürr's Die Kantaten von Johann Sebastian Bach. The continuo, which plays throughout, is not shown.

Movements of Wohl dem, der sich auf seinen Gott
No.	Title	Text	Type	Vocal	Winds	Strings	Key	Time
1	Wohl dem, der sich auf seinen Gott	Rube	Chorale fantasia	SATB	2Oa	2Vl Va	E major	common time
2	Gott ist mein Freund; was hilft das Toben	anon.	Aria	T		Vl solo	A major	3/4
3	Der Heiland sendet ja die Seinen	anon.	Recitative	A				common time
4	Das Unglück schlägt auf allen Seiten	anon.	Aria	B	2 Oa	Vl	F-sharp minor	common time
5	Ja, trag ich gleich den größten Feind in mir	anon.	Recitative	S		2Vl Va		common time
6	Dahero Trotz der Höllen Heer!	Rube	Chorale	SATB	2Oa	2Vl Va	E major	common time

=== Movements ===
==== 1 ====
The opening chorus is a chorale fantasia, setting the first stanza of the hymn, "Wohl dem, der sich auf seinen Gott recht kindlich kann verlassen!" (Fortunate the person who upon his God can place a truly childlike reliance!). The key is E major, a rare, "rather extreme" key at Bach's time, as musicologist Julian Mincham notes: only about a third of Bach's chorale cantatas begins in a major key at all, and only two in E major, the other being Liebster Gott, wenn werd ich sterben? BWV 8, "a musing on death and bereavement and one of his most personal works". Strings and the two oboes d'amore play concertante music, to which the soprano sings the cantus firmus, and the lower voices interpret the text. John Eliot Gardiner, who conducted the Bach Cantata Pilgrimage, noted that they speak of "child-like trust of the true believer" in the first section of a bar form, of "all the devils" in the second, and finally "he nonetheless remains at peace" in the third.

==== 2 ====
A tenor aria sets the text beginning with "Gott ist mein Freund" (God is my friend). The motif of the first line appears again and again in the voice and the instruments. The voice is "more convoluted" and the music tempestuous when the raging hateful enemies are mentioned, and the "Spötter", those who ridicule or mock.

==== 3 ====
An alto recitative, beginning with "Der Heiland sendet ja die Seinen recht mitten in der Wölfe Wut" (The Lord indeed sends his own right in the middle of the wolf's fury), is set as a secco.

==== 4 ====
A bass aria begins with the text "Das Unglück schlägt auf allen Seiten um mich ein zentnerschweres Band" (Misfortune on every side winds about me a hundredweight chain). The voice is accompanied by solo violin and the oboes d'amore in unison. Bach changes seamlessly from loud double-dotted music, illustrating misfortune, to "the most nonchalant texture imaginable" in 6/8 time to illustrate the text "But a helping hand suddenly appears"; Gardiner compared it to "God's outstretched hand as painted by Michelangelo in the Sistine Chapel".

==== 5 ====
A soprano recitative sets a text beginning with "Ja, trag ich gleich den größten Feind in mir, die schwere Last der Sünden" (Indeed, though I bear the worst enemy in me, the heavy burden of sin), reflecting that the enemy within is to be feared the most, rather than external threats. This recitative is accompanied by the strings.

==== 6 ====
The closing chorale, "Dahero Trotz der Höllen Heer! Trotz auch des Todes Rachen!" (Therefore defiance to the host of hell! Defiance also to the vengeance of death!), is a four-part setting.

== Manuscripts and publication ==
After Bach's death, the material for the chorale cantatas was generally split between his widow Anna Magdalena Bach, who inherited the parts, and his son Wilhelm Friedemann Bach, who received the scores and duplicate parts. While his widow passed the parts to the city of Leipzig in 1750, which held them in the library of the Thomanerchor, much of his son's inheritance is lost, including this cantata. The parts of the cantata are preserved except of an obbligato part for the second movement, possibly for another violin. A part for violin for the fourth movement was copied by Johann Christoph Altnickol between 1744 and 1747, which probably replaced a part for an instrument no longer available, such as violoncello piccolo which Bach had used for his chorale cantata cycle.

The cantata was first published in 1881 in the first complete edition of Bach's work, the Bach-Gesellschaft Ausgabe. The volume in which the cantata appeared was edited by Wilhelm Rust. Winfried Radeke and William H. Scheide independently produced similar attempts to reconstruct the missing part of the second movement in the 1970s. In 1994, the cantata was published in the Neue Bach-Ausgabe, the second complete edition of Bach's works, where it was edited by Andreas Glöckner, with a critical report following in 1995.

== Recordings ==
The selection is taken from the listing on the Bach Cantatas Website. Ensembles playing period instruments in historically informed performances are shown with a green background.

Recordings of Wohl dem, der sich auf seinen Gott
Title	Conductor / Choir / Orchestra	Soloists	Label	Year	Orch. type
Bach Cantatas Vol. 5	Karl Richter Münchener Bach-Chor Münchener Bach-Orchester	Edith Mathis; Trudeliese Schmidt; Peter Schreier; Dietrich Fischer-Dieskau	Archiv Produktion	1978	
Die Bach Kantate Vol. 58	Helmuth Rilling Gächinger Kantorei Bach-Collegium Stuttgart	Inga Nielsen; Helen Watts; Adalbert Kraus; Philippe Huttenlocher	Hänssler	1980	
J. S. Bach: Das Kantatenwerk • Complete Cantatas • Les Cantates, Folge / Vol. 34	Nikolaus Harnoncourt Tölzer Knabenchor Concentus Musicus Wien	soloist of the Tölzer Knabenchor; Paul Esswood; Kurt Equiluz; Robert Holl	Teldec	1982	Period
J. S. Bach: Complete Cantatas Vol. 11	Ton Koopman Amsterdam Baroque Orchestra & Choir	Lisa Larsson; Annette Markert; Christoph Prégardien; Klaus Mertens	Antoine Marchand	1999	Period
Bach Edition Vol. 11 – Cantatas Vol. 5	Pieter Jan Leusink Holland Boys Choir Netherlands Bach Collegium	Marjon Strijk; Sytse Buwalda; Nico van der Meel; Bas Ramselaar	Brilliant Classics	1999	Period
Bach Cantatas Vol. 5:	John Eliot Gardiner Monteverdi Choir English Baroque Soloists	Gillian Keith; Hilary Summers; William Kendall; Peter Harvey	Soli Deo Gloria	2000	Period
J. S. Bach: Cantatas Vol. 28 Cantatas from Leipzig 1724 – BWV 26, 62, 116, 139	Masaaki Suzuki Bach Collegium Japan	Yukari Nonoshita; Robin Blaze; Makoto Sakurada; Peter Kooy	BIS	2004	Period
J. S. Bach: Kantate BWV 136 Wohl dem, der sich auf seinen Gott	Rudolf Lutz Vocal ensemble of Schola Seconda Pratica Schola Seconda Pratica	Susanne Frei; Antonia Frey; Johannes Kaleschke; Ekkehard Abele	Gallus Media	2008	Period
