= Sei Lob und Ehr dem höchsten Gut, BWV 117 =

Chorale cantata by Johann Sebastian Bach

Sei Lob und Ehr dem höchsten Gut (Praise and honour be to the highest good), BWV 117, (Note: "BWV" is Bach-Werke-Verzeichnis, a thematic catalogue of Bach's works.) is a church cantata by Johann Sebastian Bach. He composed the chorale cantata in Leipzig between 1728 and 1731 for no specific occasion, based on the hymn by Johann Jacob Schütz.

== History and text ==
Bach composed the chorale cantata in Leipzig between 1728 and 1731 for no specific occasion, based on the hymn by Johann Jakob Schütz. Musicologist Julian Mincham suggests two possibilities: it may have been intended as a "general-purpose" cantata, able to be used for almost any occasion with only minimal changes; or it may have been written for a ceremony of some kind, likely a wedding.

== Scoring and structure ==
The work is scored for three vocal soloists (alto, tenor, and bass), a four-part choir, two flutes, two oboes, two oboes d'amore, two violins, viola, and basso continuo.

Despite being only twenty minutes long, the cantata includes nine movements.

1. Chorale: Sei Lob und Ehr dem höchsten Gut
2. Recitative (bass): Es danken dir die Himmelsheer
3. Aria (tenor): Was unser Gott geschaffen hat
4. Chorale: Ich rief dem Herrn in meiner Not
5. Recitative (alto): Der Herr ist noch und nimmer nicht
6. Aria (bass): Wenn Trost und Hülf ermangeln muss
7. Aria (alto): Ich will dich all mein Leben lang
8. Recitative (tenor): Ihr, die ihr Christi Namen nennt
9. Chorale: So kommet vor sein Angesicht

== Music ==
Simon Crouch remarks that this cantata is "pervaded with the spirit of the dance", particularly given its frequent use of triple meter and the dominance of the major mode.

The opening chorus is a chorale fantasia wherein the soprano sings the chorale melody while the lower voices create chordal harmonies. The long instrumental ritornello, created by strings (doubled by oboes and flutes) and continuo, appears at the beginning of the movement and four bars before the voices finish at the end.

The second movement is a bass recitative remarkable for its final line: Bach repeats the line four times in an arioso, accompanied by "a version of Schweitzer's three-note 'joy' motive" in the continuo. The text moves from a typical thanksgiving to encourage the listener to give honour to God.

The tenor aria adopts the minor mode, despite the continued optimism of the text. Harmonically the movement consists of four contrapuntal lines created by the vocalist, continuo, and two oboes d'amore. Although there is no notated da capo, the music allows a recapitulation of the opening theme.

The central chorale adopts the least optimistic text from the original hymn, contrasting with the mostly upbeat other movements. Unusually for a Bach cantata, it is a simple setting of the chorale melody placed in the middle of the cantata rather than at the end. The primary melody is based on a repeated note and modal motive.

The alto recitative is quite similar to the bass recitative of the second movement, varying only in the fullness of the opening accompaniment. As with the earlier recitative, it concludes on an arioso repeating the last line of text, again with the "joy" motive in the continuo.

The bass aria mirrors the earlier tenor aria in adopting the minor mode. The movement is remarkable for its "reaching" obbligato violin and for the multiple instances of word painting throughout the vocal line.

The seventh movement is an alto aria in which the singer assumes a personal view of devotion. The accompaniment comprises flowing triplets in the flute, "the palpitations of an excited heartbeat", over repeated chords in the strings.

The tenor recitative adopts the voice of a pastor preaching to his followers. The movement is "short but operatically declamatory" and modulates from the minor mode to G major to set up the final movement.

Unusual for Bach who often closes cantatas with a simple four-part setting of a chorale, the closing chorus reprises the music of the first movement, with a text entreating the listener to sing and dance.

== Recordings ==
- Thomanerchor Leipzig / Gewandhausorchester Leipzig. Bach Made in Germany, vol. 1. Eterna, 1949.
- Göttinger Stadtkantorei / Frankfurter Kantatenorchester. J.S. Bach: Cantatas BWV 93 & BWV 117. Vanguard, 1960.
- Kantorei der Karlshöhe Ludwigsburg / Stuttgarter Bachorchester. Das Kantatenwork. FSM, 1973.
- Amsterdam Baroque Orchestra & Choir, Ton Koopman J.S. Bach: Complete Cantatas, Vol. 19. Antoine Marchand, 2005.
