= Innsbruck, ich muss dich lassen =

1485 song composed by Heinrich Isaac

- Renaissance song
- English: "Innsbruck, I must leave thee"
- Language: German
- Composed: 1485

"Innsbruck, ich muss dich lassen" ("Innsbruck, I must leave thee") is a German Renaissance song. It was first published as a choral movement by the Franco-Flemish composer Heinrich Isaac (ca. 1450–1517); the melody was probably written by him. The lyricist is unknown; an authorship of Emperor Maximilian I, as was previously assumed, seems highly unlikely. Chester Lee Alwes writes that the song "became the gold standard of the Lied genre".

== Melody ==
There has been doubt whether the melody was in fact written by Heinrich Isaac or copied from earlier tunes. The melody was later used in a Lutheran chorale, "O Welt, ich muß dich lassen", and still appears in modern English-language hymnals under the name "Innsbruck", to a wide variety of text, of which the most common one is "The duteous day now closeth", a paraphrase of Paul Gerhardt's "Nun ruhen alle Wälder".

The song exists in two different four-part settings by Heinrich Isaac: a Diskantlied with the melody in the soprano part (transcribed below), and a Tenorlied with the cantus firmus in the tenor part.

The hymn "In allen meinen Taten" by Paul Fleming (1609–1640) was written for the same melody. Johann Sebastian Bach used it in several cantatas, especially in the chorale cantata In allen meinen Taten, BWV 97 (1734).

== Lyrics ==
The song is famously associated with the city of Innsbruck in Tyrol (in modern-day Austria). The lyrics express sorrow at having to leave a post at court, as the singer is forced to abandon his love and to depart to a foreign country. He promises her faithfulness and commends her to God's protection. Though Heinrich Isaac indeed spent some time in Innsbruck, the text was probably not written by him.

The stanzaic form consists of six iambic trimeters with a A–A–B–C–C–B rhyme scheme.

Innsbruck, ich muss dich lassen,
ich fahr dahin mein Straßen,
in fremde Land dahin;
mein Freud ist mir genommen,
die ich nicht weiß bekommen,
wo ich im Elend bin.

Groß Leid muss ich jetzt tragen,
das ich allein tu klagen
dem liebsten Buhlen mein;
ach Lieb, nun lass mich Armen
im Herzen dein erbarmen,
dass ich muss von dannen sein!

Mein Trost ob allen Weiben,
dein tu ich ewig bleiben,
stet' treu, der Ehren fromm;
nun muss dich Gott bewahren,
in aller Tugend sparen,
bis dass ich wieder komm!

Translation:

Innsbruck, I must leave you;
I will go my way
to foreign land(s).
My joy has been taken away from me,
that I cannot achieve
while being abroad.

I must now bear great sorrow
that I can only share
with my dearest lover.
Oh love, hold poor me
(and) in your heart compassion
that I must be away.

My consolation: above all other women,
I will forever be yours,
always faithful, in true honor.
And now, may God protect you,
keep you in perfect virtue,
until I shall return.

== See also ==
- Music of Innsbruck
