= Theodor Kolde =

German Protestant theologian (1850-1913)

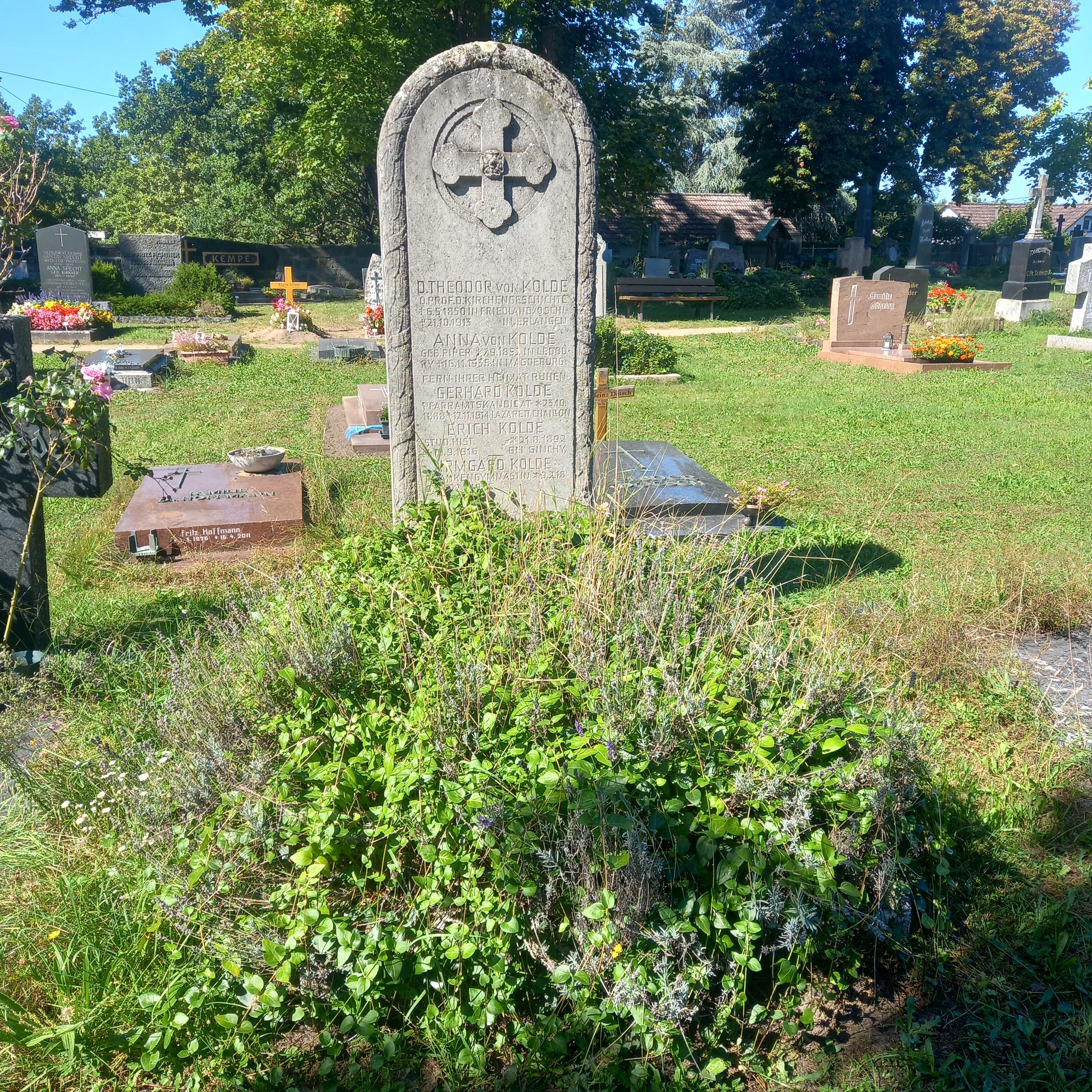
The grave of Theodor von Kolde and his wife Anna (née Piper) in the family grave in the Neustädter Friedhof in Erlangen

Theodor Kolde (6 May 1850 – 21 October 1913) was a German Protestant theologian, born at Friedland in Silesia.

== Biography ==
He studied at the universities in Breslau and Leipzig. In 1876 he commenced lecturing on theology at the University of Marburg, where he became professor extraordinarius in 1879. In 1881 he was appointed professor of church history at the University of Erlangen.

== Published works ==
He edited the Beiträge zur bayerischen Kirchengeschichte (20 volumes, 1895–1913) and Die Universität unter dem Hause Wittelsbach, 1810-1910 (1910). His principal publications include:

- Luthers Stellung zu Konzil und Kirche bis zum Wormser Reichstag (1876)
- Die deutsche Augustinerkongregation und Johann von Staupitz (1879)
- Friedrich der Weise und die Anfänge der Reformation (1881)
- Martin Luther: Eine Biographie (1884–93)
- Die Heilsarmee nach eigener Anschauung und nach ihren Schriften (1885)
- Der Methodismus und seine Bekämpfung (1886)
- Luthers Selbstmord: Eine Geschichtslüge Majunkes (third edition, 1890)
- Ueber Grenzen des historischen Erkennens (1890)
- Die kirchlichen Bruderschaften und das religiöse Leben im modernen Katholizismus (1895)
- Die Augsburgische Konfession, lateinisch und deutsch, kurz erläutert (1896; second edition, 1911)
- Das religiöse Leben in Erfurt beim Ausgange des Mittelalters (1898)
- Die Heilsarmee, ihre Geschichte und ihr Wesen (1899)
- Der Katholizismus und das 20. Jahrhundert, kritische Betrachtungen (1903)
- Der Staatsgedanke der Reformation und die römische Kirche (1903)
- Die Anfänge einer katholischen Gemeinde in Erlangen (1906)
- Historische Einleitung in die symbolischen Bücher der evangelisch-lutherischen Kirche (1907; third edition, 1913)
