= Johannes Agricola =

German Protestant Reformer (1494–1566)

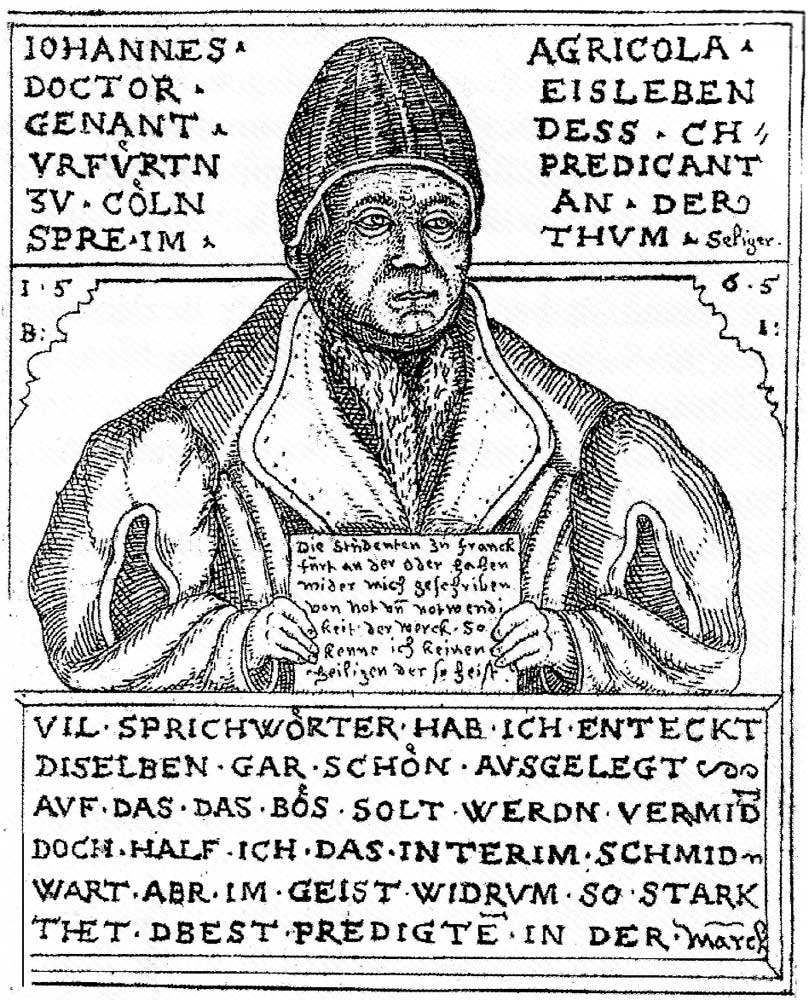
Johannes Agricola

Johann or Johannes Agricola (originally Schneider, then Schnitter; 20 April 1494 – 22 September 1566) was a German Protestant Reformer during the Protestant Reformation. He was a follower and friend of Martin Luther, who became his antagonist in the matter of the binding obligation of the law on Christians.

== Biography ==
=== Early life ===
Agricola was born as the son of the master taylor Albrecht Schnitter at Eisleben, whence he is sometimes called Magister Islebius. He studied at Wittenberg, where he soon gained the friendship of Martin Luther. In 1519 he accompanied Luther to the great assembly of German divines at Leipzig, and acted as recording secretary. After teaching for some time in Wittenberg, he went to Frankfurt in 1525 to establish the Protestant mode of worship. He had resided there only a month when he was called to Eisleben, where he remained until 1526 as teacher in the school of St Andrew, and preacher in the Nicolai church.

=== Controversy ===
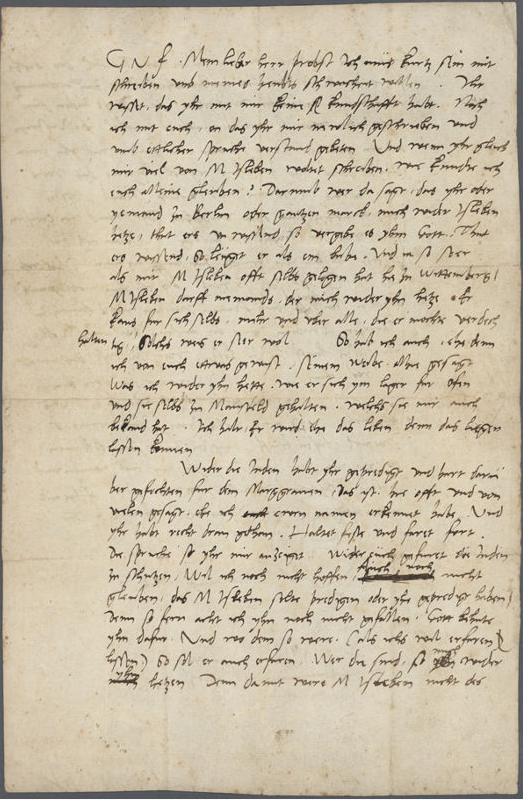
Private letter in which Luther says Agricola is "a liar"

In 1536 he was recalled to teach in Wittenberg, and was welcomed by Luther. Almost immediately, however, a controversy, which had been begun ten years before and been temporarily silenced, broke out more violently than ever. Agricola was the first to teach the views which Luther was the first to stigmatize by the name Antinomian, maintaining that while non-Christians were still held to the Mosaic law, Christians were entirely free from it, being under the gospel alone. (See also: Law and Gospel). The controversy made the two theologians break apart. Philip Melanchthon taught that it was necessary to do good works, but they were an outgrowth of faith and not the reason for receiving forgiveness. Agricola felt that Melanchthon's view of the law was at odds with Luther's. Agricola felt there was no need for the law after justification.

=== Restoration and later life ===
As a consequence of the bitter controversy with Luther, in 1540 Agricola left Wittenberg secretly for Berlin, where he published a letter addressed to Frederick III, Elector of Saxony, which was generally interpreted as a recantation of his prior views. Luther, however, seems not to have so accepted it, and Agricola remained at Berlin.

Joachim II Hector, Elector of Brandenburg, having taken Agricola into his favour, appointed him court preacher and general superintendent. He held both offices until his death in 1566, and his career in Brandenburg was one of great activity and influence.

Along with Julius von Pflug, bishop of Naumburg-Zeitz, and Michael Helding, titular bishop of Sidon, he prepared the Augsburg Interim of 1548, a proposed settlement under which Protestants would accept all Catholic authority, being permitted to retain the Protestant teaching on communion under both kinds and married clergy, but otherwise compelled to accept Catholic doctrine and practice, including the rejection of justification by faith alone. From that time, he was an outcast among Protestant theologians. Ironically, one of the most radical Reformers ended his life regarded by Protestants as having capitulated to Catholics.

He endeavored in vain to appease the Adiaphoristic controversy.

He died during an epidemic of plague on 22 September 1566 in Berlin.

== Writings ==
Agricola wrote a number of theological works. He was among the first to make a commentated collection of German proverbs. The first volume contains 300 proverbs and was published in 1529 (Drey hundert Gemeyner Sprichworter, der wir Deutschen vns gebrauchen, vnd doch nicht wissen woher sie kommen; first published in Low German the year before); the second volume contains 450 proverbs and was published in 1530 (Das ander teyl gemainer Tewtscher Sprichwörter, mit jhrer außlegung : hat fünffthalb hundert newer Wörtter). A revised edition containing the seven hundred and fifty proverbs of the previous two volumes was published in 1534 (Sybenhundert und fünfftzig teütscher Sprichwörter, verneüwert und gebessert) and later republished with updated orthography, for example, in Wittenberg in 1592.

== In literature ==
In 1836, Robert Browning used him as the subject of an early poetic soliloquy, "Johannes Agricola in Meditation".
