= Hänssler =

German music publishing house

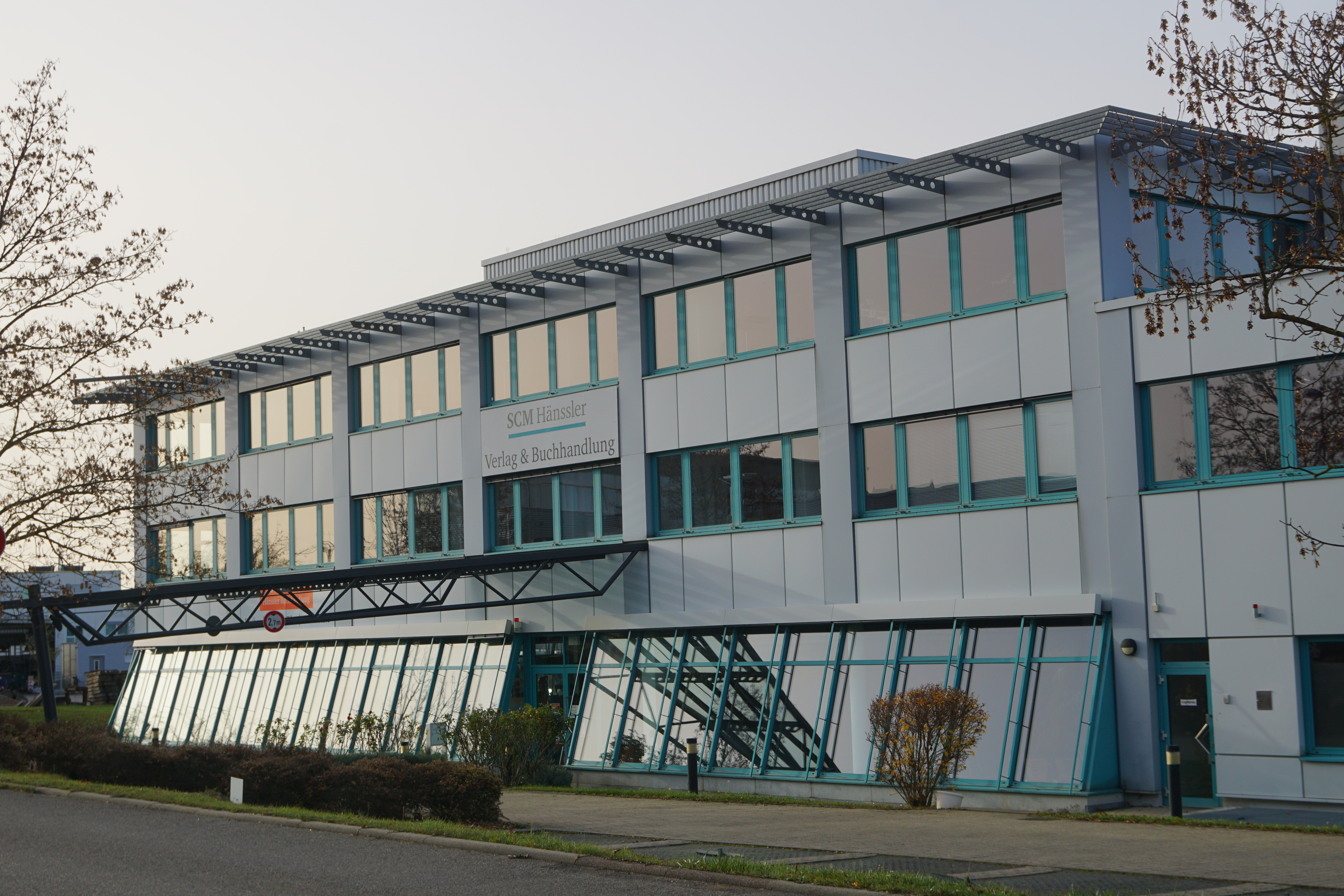
- Parent company: SCM
- Founded: 1919
- Founder: Friedrich Hänssler Senior
- Country of origin: Germany
- Headquarters location: Holzgerlingen
- Key people: Friedrich Hänssler Jr.
- Nonfiction topics: Music

Hänssler-Verlag (SCM Hänsler) is a German music publishing house founded in 1919 as Musikverlag Hänssler by Friedrich Hänssler senior (died 1972) to publish church music. Since the 2007 merger with other evangelical publishers to form the SCM Publishing House of the Christian Media Foundation (SCM), the portfolio has continued under the SCM Hänssler brand. Since 2015, the Hänssler Classic music label has been fully under the control of its co-founder, Günter Hänssler.

In 1941 the Nazi government shut down the publishing house. It was allowed by the West German authorities to reopen in 1947.

The company is now based in Holzgerlingen, Baden-Württemberg. Since 1972 Hänssler Verlag has also published contemporary and jazz music. Hänssler Classic (now written hänssler CLASSIC in the company's own materials), was founded 1975 by Friedrich Hänssler Jr., as the company's in-house classical record label.

The record label is one of the publishers of the classical radio station Südwestrundfunk (SWR) which has three orchestras, a choir and a big band. The label is also a partner with the Internationale Bachakademie Stuttgart, founded 1981 by Helmuth Rilling.

In 2002 Hänssler became part of SCM (de:Stiftung Christliche Medien), an Evangelical Christian media foundation.
