= Wachet auf, ruft uns die Stimme (J. C. F. Bach) =

- Chorale motet by Johann Christoph Friedrich Bach
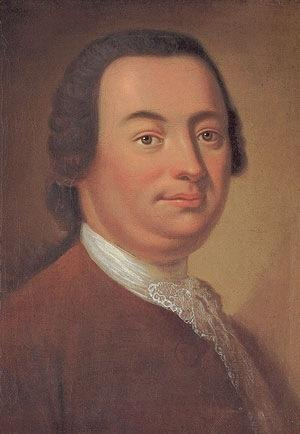
- The composer in 1774
- Key: E♭ major
- Catalogue: Wf XV:2
- Text: "Wachet auf, ruft uns die Stimme"
- Language: German
- Composed: around 1780
- Scoring: SATB choir

Wachet auf, ruft uns die Stimme (Wake, o wake and hear the voices), Wf XV:2, is a German chorale motet composed around 1780 by Johann Christoph Friedrich Bach, a son of Johann Sebastian Bach. It is based on Philipp Nicolai's hymn "Wachet auf, ruft uns die Stimme". The motet in E♭ major is written for a four-part choir. It is structured in three movements, quoting in the last movement his fathers's chorale setting.

== History and music ==
Johann Christoph Friedrich Bach (21 June 1732 – 26 January 1795), born as a son of J. S. Bach and his second wife, Anna Magdalena, first began to study law, but in 1750 when he was still a teenager became a court musician of Wilhelm, Count of Schaumburg-Lippe in Bückeburg, where Italian style was preferred. He pursued a fusion of the counterpoint he had learned with "the simpler textures and harmonies of the South".

Bach composed the motet around 1780 in E♭ major for a four-part choir (SATB) which can be supported by a choir of four instruments or organ. It is structured in three movements, corresponding to the three stanzas of the hymn. The first movement is an extended chorale fantasia, the second develops motifs from the first movement, the third includes a quotation of his fathers's closing choral chorale from his cantata Wachet auf, ruft uns die Stimme, BWV 140.

The first movement is structured in three sections. "Wachet auf" opens with fanfares of upward broken triads, first slow as the beginning of the hymn tune, then faster, all in homophony. An extended polyphonic section in coloraturas stills calls to wake up, only then the text "ruft uns die Stimme ..." is introduced. The second section is a chorale fantasia of the complete tune, with the cantus firmus in long notes in the soprano, while the lower voices add character to the text, for example by singing in a low register when the second line begins with the word "Mitternacht" (midnight). The third section is a short recapitulation of the beginning.

The second Movement on the text of the second stanza begins with "Zion hört die Wächter singen", set freely with "only hints of the chorale tune". Its line "Hosianna" quotes the tune, followed by word painting setting "Wir folgen all zum Freudensaal" (We follow all to the joyful hall). The musicologist S. Lachtermann notes: "The shape of the lines, and the contour of the harmonic progression are 'modern', but the interlacing of voices and the focus on individual words harken back to his father's art."

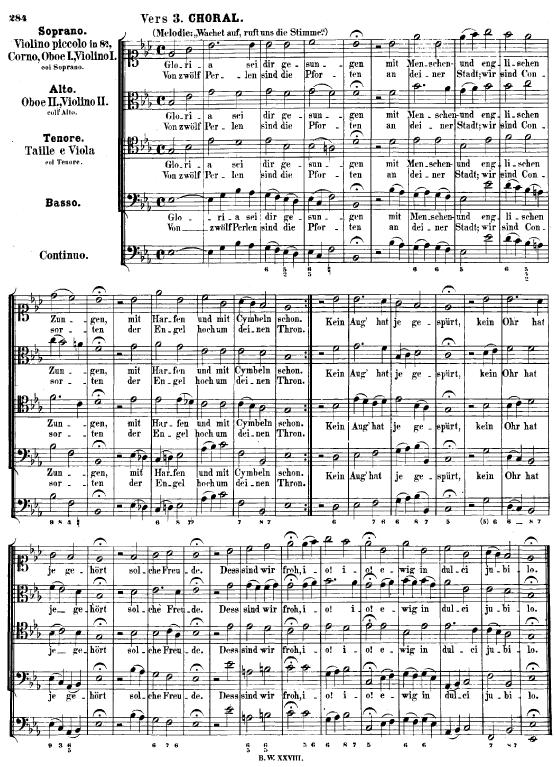
The quoted closing chorale from J. S. Bach's cantata

The final stanza, "Gloria sei dir gesungen" (Gloria be sung to you) is again structured in three sections. It opens with an extended "anthem-like" treatment, followed by a quotation of the complete closing choral chorale from his father's cantata Wachet auf, ruft uns die Stimme, as a tribute to him. The conclusion has been described as "some fugal fun reiterating Nicolai's last four ecstatic lines."

The duration of the motet is around 17 minutes. The autograph manuscript of the score is kept in Berlin, Westdeutsche Bibliothek-Marburg, Ms. P. 379.

The motet was recorded, among others, by the Rheinische Kantorei under the direction of Hermann Max.
