= Chorale motet =

- Stylistic origins: Franco-Flemish polyphony
- Cultural origins: Europe following Protestant Reformation

The chorale motet was a type of musical composition in mostly Protestant parts of Europe, principally Germany, and mainly during the 16th century. It involved setting a chorale melody and text as a motet.

Stylistically chorale motets were similar at first to motets composed in Catholic countries, and made use of the full range of techniques of Franco-Flemish polyphony. In the earlier period, the chorale was typically used as a cantus firmus, fairly easy to hear, with other lines either weaving in and out contrapuntally around it, or following along in the same rhythm in an entirely homophonic style. Later in the century, especially around 1600, the successive verses of the chorale were used to begin imitative sections in a fugal style. Shortly after 1600 the form began to disappear, overtaken by newer forms based on Italian (especially Venetian) models: the chorale concerto, and later the chorale cantata. The chorale cantata was to become the most substantial of the descendants of the chorale motet, and eventually culminated in the work of J.S. Bach.

Composers of early chorale motets included Johann Walter, who typically used a cantus firmus type of motet setting; Balthasar Resinarius, who wrote in the complex polyphonic style; Sixt Dietrich, who chose the simpler homophonic style; and Ludwig Senfl, Lupus Hellinck, Thomas Stoltzer, and others. Some of these composers were Roman Catholic: the Thirty Years' War had not yet torn Germany apart, and composers from both branches of Christianity were still mixing freely.

Between the late 1560s and the early 1580s, the renowned composer Orlande de Lassus, who was working in Munich, contributed several volumes of chorale motets of his own: Newe Teütsche Liedlein mit fünf Stimmen (books 1 and 2) and Newe teutsche Lieder. In these motets the voices are equally balanced, as in the style of Palestrina.

Around 1600 a new group of composers, many of whom had studied in Italy, brought new ideas to the chorale motet. Some of these composers were among the most famous and talented in Europe, including Melchior Franck, Hans Leo Hassler, and the spectacularly prolific Michael Praetorius. Praetorius's Musae Sioniae (1605-1610), an enormous collection of approximately 1200 pieces, includes some of the finest and most advanced examples of the form; however, by this time the chorale concerto and other types of chorale settings were beginning to eclipse the chorale motet as a primary means of expression for the German chorale.

Bach's son Johann Christoph Friedrich Bach composed a motet in three movements in the second half of the 18th century, Wachet auf, ruft uns die Stimme, still using Baroques techniques such as a chorale fantasia on Nicolai's "Wachet auf, ruft uns die Stimme" and the inclusion of a setting by his father.

== References and further reading ==
- Articles "Chorale motet," "Chorale settings," in The New Grove Dictionary of Music and Musicians, ed. Stanley Sadie. 20 vol. London, Macmillan Publishers Ltd., 1980. ISBN 1-56159-174-2
- Gustave Reese, Music in the Renaissance. New York, W.W. Norton & Co., 1954. ISBN 0-393-09530-4
- Manfred Bukofzer, Music in the Baroque Era. New York, W.W. Norton & Co., 1947. ISBN 0-393-09745-5
