= Rheinische Kantorei =

German vocal ensemble

The Rheinische Kantorei is a German vocal ensemble of baroque music accompanied by an instrumental ensemble called Das Kleine Konzert.

== History ==
The Rheinische Kantorei and Das Kleine Konzert were founded in 1977 by the German conductor Hermann Max.

This vocal ensemble has between twelve and thirty-two singers.

It has worked with soloists such as soprano Barbara Schlick, tenors Paul Elliott and Christoph Prégardien and basses Gotthold Schwarz and Stephen Varcoe.

Its repertoire is mainly Renaissance and Baroque but also includes classical and romantic works.

The ensemble intensively explores the repertoire of representatives of the different generations of the Bach family:

- Johannes Bach, Heinrich Bach, Johann Michael Bach
- Johann Sebastian Bach, Johann Ernst Bach, Johann Ludwig Bach
- Wilhelm Friedemann Bach, Carl Philipp Emanuel Bach, Johann Christian Bach, Johann Christoph Friedrich Bach
- Wilhelm Friedrich Ernst Bach

It also focuses on Johann Sebastian Bach's predecessors (Franz Tunder, Philipp Heinrich Erlebach, Christoph Bernhard, Johann Caspar Ferdinand Fischer), to his contemporaries (Johann Friedrich Fasch, Gottfried Heinrich Stölzel, Christoph Graupner) as well as to later Baroque composers (Johann Adolf Hasse, Carl Heinrich Graun, Carl Ditters von Dittersdorf, Gottfried August Homilius).

== Recording (selection) ==
- 1981: Cantata Mache dich auf, werde licht by Johann Ludwig Bach
- 1987: Cantatas Wq239, Wq249, Wq243, Wq217, Wq250, Wq222 and Wq251 by Carl Philipp Emanuel Bach
- 1988: Die Auferstehung und Himmelfahrt Jesu Wq 240 and Gott hat den Herrn auferweckt Wq 244 by Carl Philipp Emanuel Bach
- 1988: Cantatas Klopstocks Morgengesang am Schöpfungsfeste, Auf, schicke dich recht feierlich Anbetung dem Erbarmer and Heilig and Carl Philipp Emanuel Bach
- 1988: Cantatas Zur Einführung des H.P.Gasie, Wer ist so würdig als du and Der Herr lebt by Carl Philipp Emanuel Bach
- 1988: Geistliche Kantaten by Carl Philipp Emanuel Bach, Johann Christoph Altnickol, Georg Benda
- 1989: Oratorio Die Kindheit Jesu by Johann Christoph Friedrich Bach
- 1990: Cantatas Pygmalion, Die Amerikanerin and Ino by Johann Christoph Friedrich Bach
- 1990: Israelsbrünnlein by Johann Hermann Schein
- 1990: Passionsoratorium by Johann Ernst Bach
- 1990: Missa brevis and motet Deus judicium tuum by Georg Philipp Telemann
- 1991: Cantatas Die Tageszeiten and Daran ist erschienen die Liebe Gottes by Georg Philipp Telemann
- 1993: Cantatas Lasset uns ablegen die Werke der Finsternis and Es ist eine Stimme eines Predigers in der Wüste by Wilhelm Friedemann Bach
- 1994: Cantatas Dies ist der Tag and Erzittert und fallet by Wilhelm Friedemann Bach
- 1995: Cantatas Der Herr ist König and Die Donnerode by Georg Philipp Telemann
- 1998: Trauermusik by Johann Ludwig Bach
- 1998: Messe in D by Johann Adolf Hasse
- 1999: Kantata Es begab sich, daß Jesus in eine Stadt mit Namen Nain ging by Christoph Graupner
- 1999: Weihnachtsoratorium by Carl Heinrich Graun
- 2000: Kantate Cassandra by Johann Christoph Friedrich Bach
- 2000: Friedens Cantata by Johann Michael Bach
- 2000: Cantates & Symphonies Columbus by Johann Michael Bach
- 2001: Oratorium Gesù al Calvario by Jan Dismas Zelenka
- 2001: Oratorium Giob by Karl Ditters Von Dittersdorf
- 2002: Oratorium Gioas – Rè di Giuda by Johann Christian Bach
- 2002: Serenata eroica by Georg Philipp Telemann
- 2003: Geistliche Konzerte by Franz Tunder
- 2004: Geistliche Harmonien by Christoph Bernhard
- 2005: Die Könige in Israel by Ferdinand Ries
- 2007: Kapitänsmusik von 1738 by Georg Philipp Telemann
- 2008: Große Passion Kommt her und schaut by Carl Heinrich Graun
- 2010: Weihnachtskantaten by Christoph Graupner
