= Hermann Max =

German choral conductor

Hermann Max (born 1941 in Goslar) is a German choral conductor.

In 1977, he founded the Jugendkantorei Dormagen, which in 1985 became the basis of the Rheinische Kantorei and Das Kleine Konzert. In 1992, he founded the Knechtsteden Early Music Festival.

The Rheinische Kantorei and Das Kleine Konzert under Max have a discography of over 100 recordings focussing on the German choral repertory, particularly the Bach family: J. S. Bach, W. F. Bach, W. F. E. Bach, J. C. F. Bach, J. C. Bach, C. P. E. Bach, the distantly related J. L. Bach, and the last of the composing Bachs J. M. Bach the Younger, as well as Telemann, Graupner, Hummel, Naumann, Andreas Romberg, Johann Heinrich Rolle and others.
