= Johann Heinrich Rolle =

German composer (1716-1785)

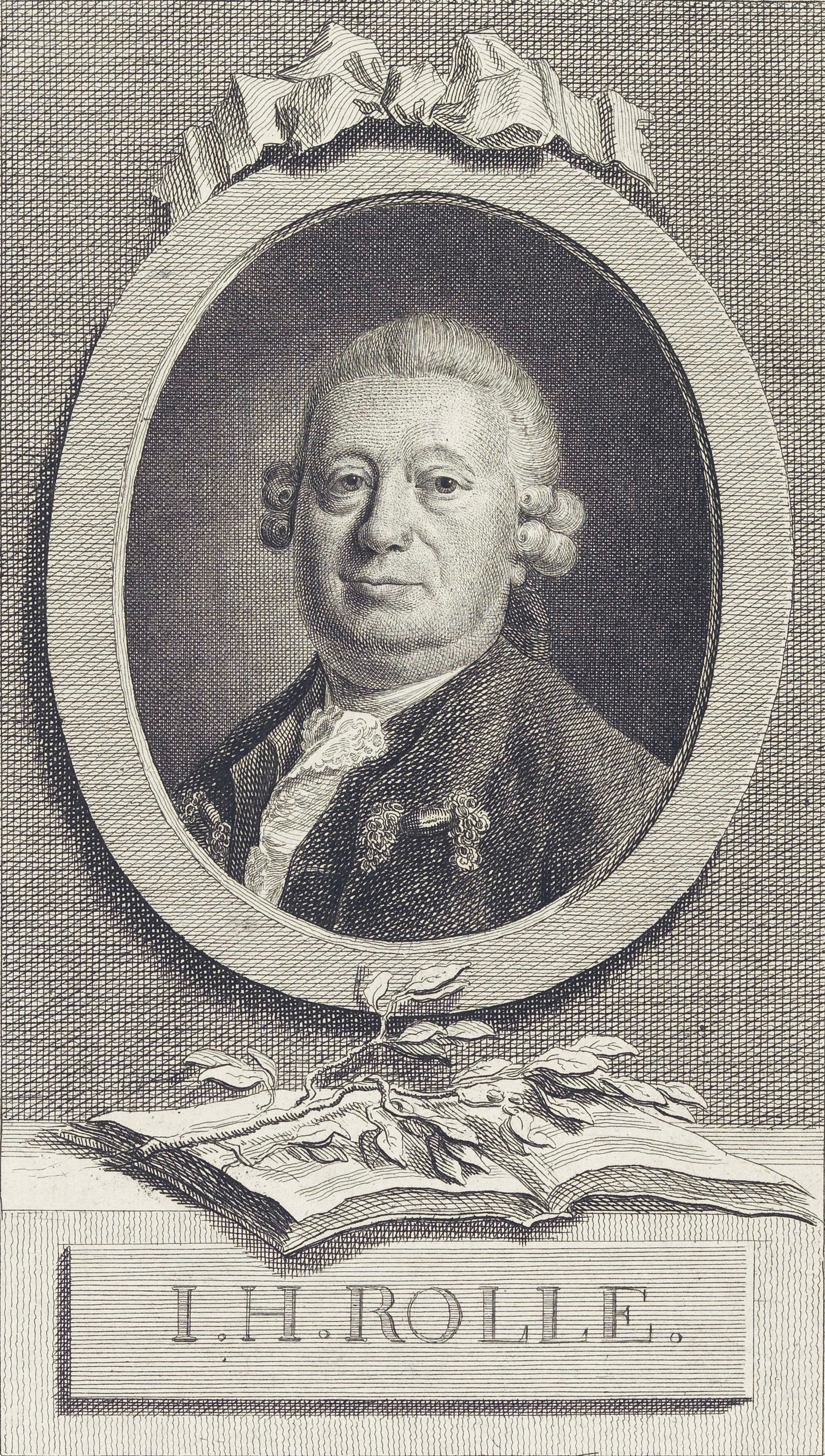
Johann Heinrich Rolle

Johann Heinrich Rolle (23 December 1716 – 29 December 1785) was a German pre-classical composer.

Rolle was born in Quedlinburg. His father was a musician in Magdeburg, and in his early years Rolle served there as an organist while studying law. In 1741, he became a chamber musician in the court of the Prussian King Frederick II, before returning to Magdeburg in 1746 to take up the position of organist at St John's Church. Rolle's father died in 1751, and Rolle succeeded him as music director at the Altstädtisches Gymnasium, a secondary school. He died in Magdeburg, aged 69.

Rolle is remembered mainly for his Christmas Oratorio.

== Selected recordings ==
- Der Tod Abels Das Kleine Konzert dir. Hermann Max Capriccio
- Matthäuspassion Kölner Akademie dir. Michael Alexander Willens Deutschlandfunk
