= Philipp Nicolai =

German Lutheran pastor and hymnwriter (1556–1608)

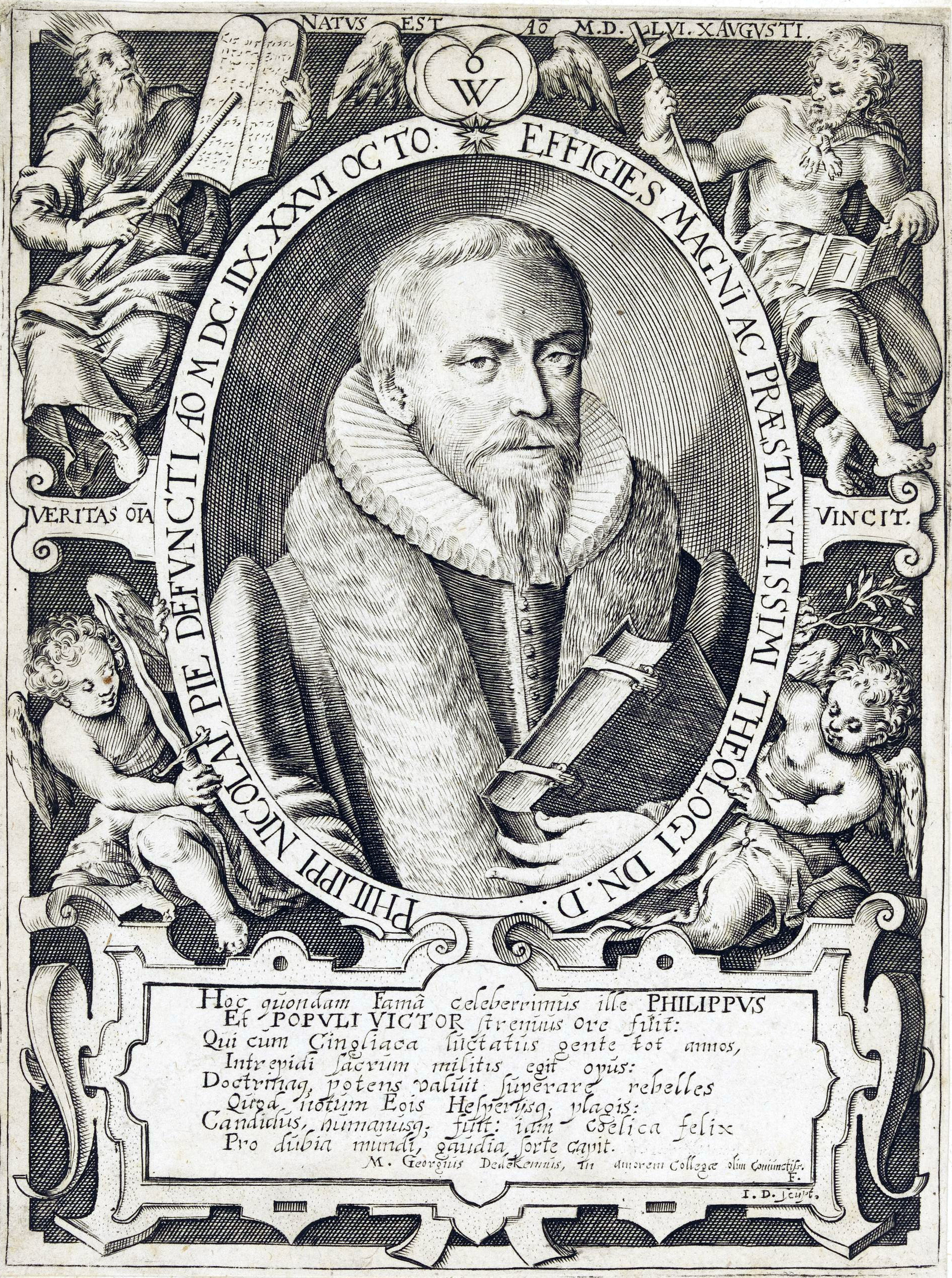
- Portrait from Deorum Dearumque by Hans Vredeman de Vries, 1573.
- Born: 10 August 1556; Mengeringhausen, County of Waldeck, Holy Roman Empire
- Died: 26 October 1608 (aged 52); Hamburg, Holy Roman Empire
- Education: University of Erfurt
- Occupations: Theologian; Hymnodist; Cleric
- Known for: "Wachet auf, ruft uns die Stimme"; "Wie schön leuchtet der Morgenstern"

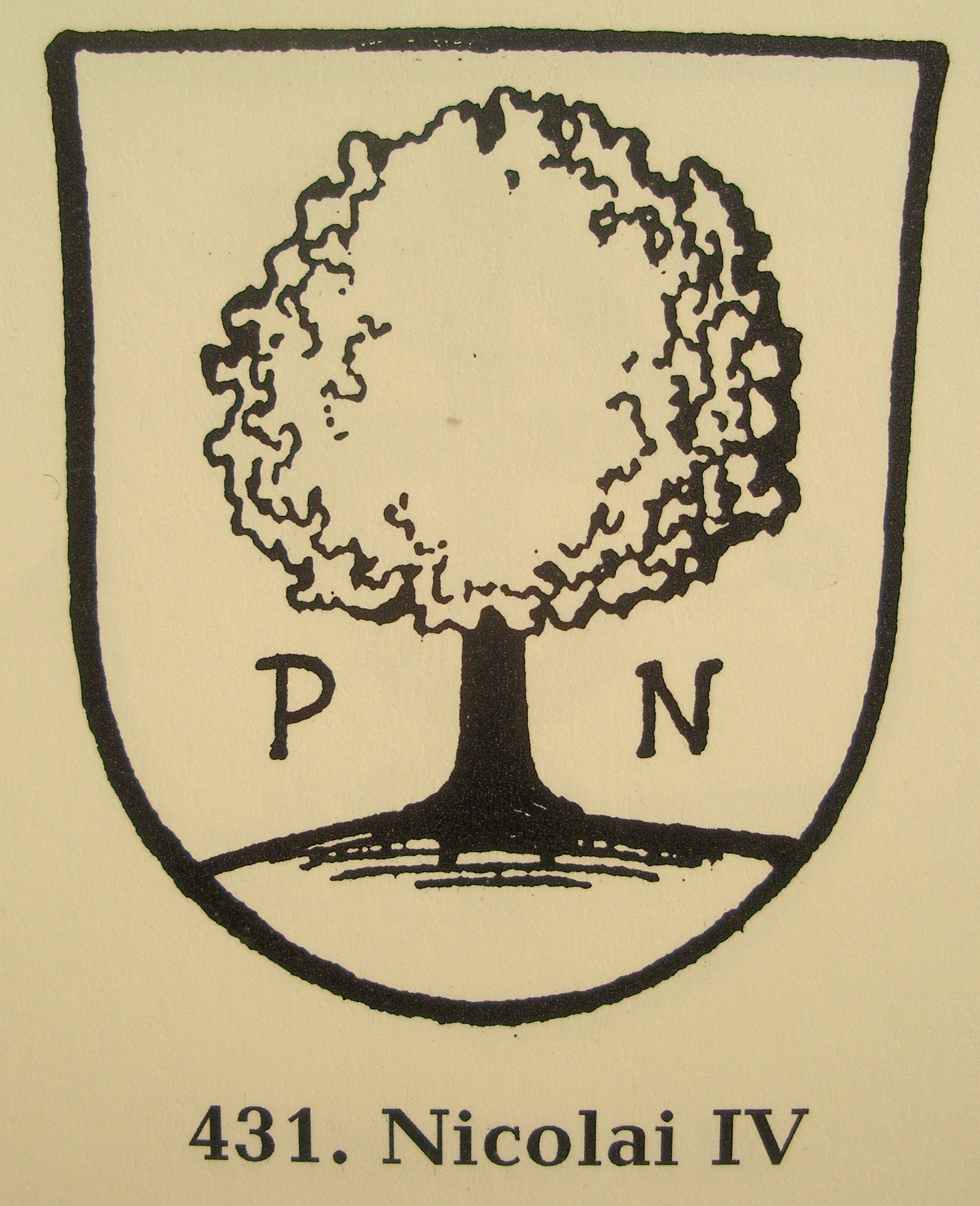
Seal of the minister Philipp Nicolai

Philipp Nicolai (10 August 1556 – 26 October 1608) was a German Lutheran pastor, poet, and composer. He is most widely recognized as a hymnodist.

== Life ==
Philipp Nicolai was born at Mengeringhausen in Waldeck, where his father was a Lutheran pastor. His early education included studies at Kassel, Hildesheim and Dortmund. He studied theology at the University of Erfurt where he was a pupil of Ludwig Helmbold.

In 1583, he was ordained to the Lutheran ministry and was appointed minister at Herdecke. He was subsequently expelled during the Counter-Reformation. In 1588, he became pastor at Altwildungen in Hesse. He graduated with a Doctorate Degree in Theology from the University of Wittenberg in 1594. In 1596, he became the minister at Unna in Westphalia. In 1601, he was elected chief pastor of St. Catherine's Church (Katharinenkirche) in Hamburg.

Nicolai died in Hamburg on 26 October 1608, at age 52.

== Work ==
He was the author of two famous hymns: "Wachet auf, ruft uns die Stimme" and "Wie schön leuchtet der Morgenstern", sometimes referred to as the King and Queen of Chorales, respectively. These two chorales have inspired many composers, including Johann Sebastian Bach, whose chorale cantatas Wie schön leuchtet der Morgenstern, BWV 1, and Wachet auf, ruft uns die Stimme, BWV 140, are based on them. Bach's organ transcription of the latter, as published in the Schübler Chorales, has become world famous. Nicolai is supposed to be the last example of the Meistersinger tradition, in which words and music, text and melody stem from one and the same person.

Philipp Nicolai is commemorated in the Calendar of Saints of the Lutheran Church on 26 October together with hymnodists Johann Heermann and Paul Gerhardt.

== Other sources ==
- Glover, Raymond F. (1990) The Hymnal 1982 Companion, Volume One (Church Publishing Inc) ISBN 9780898691436
- Crump, William D. (2013) The Christmas encyclopedia (McFarland & Company, 3rd ed.) ISBN 9780786468270
