= Sonata No. 6 in E-flat major (J. C. F. Bach) =

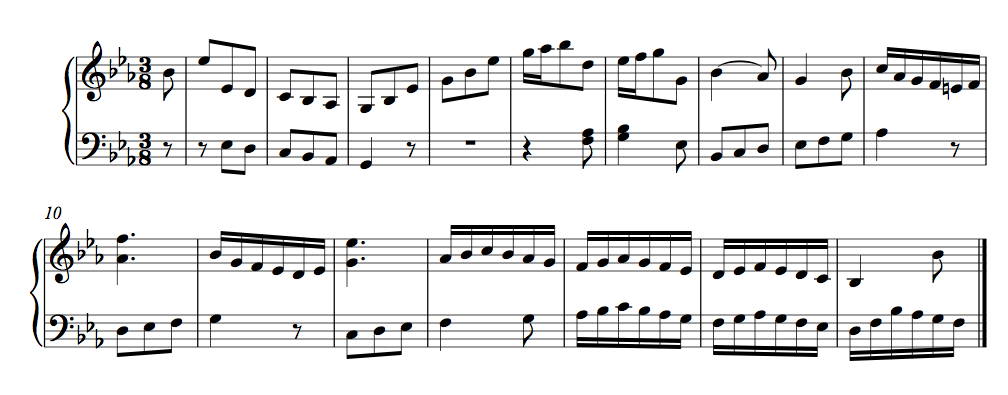
The first 16 bars of the Sonata No.6 in E-flat major

Sonata No. 6 in E♭ major, WXI/3 is a sonata written for keyboard by Johann Christoph Friedrich Bach.

== Structure ==
The piece starts off with a motif, which is in the score image, that then repeats with a slight variation at the end. There is then a short section involving a sequence and many typical baroque trills. There is then a section where the left hand plays a sequence, followed by a right hand playing three semiquavers. After several of these, there is a new motif. This then ends in some syncopation and finally, the piece repeats its original tune.

Further on, there is a modulation to A♭ major, where the main theme is repeated. The piece ends with the last three-quarters of the original motif, its repeat and a modulation back to the original key of E♭ major.

== Culture ==
This piece is currently on the 2009-2010, Grade 7 Piano syllabus of the Associated Board of the Royal Schools of Music
