= Wachet auf, ruft uns die Stimme =

Hymn in German by Philipp Nicolai

- Lutheran hymn by Philipp Nicolai
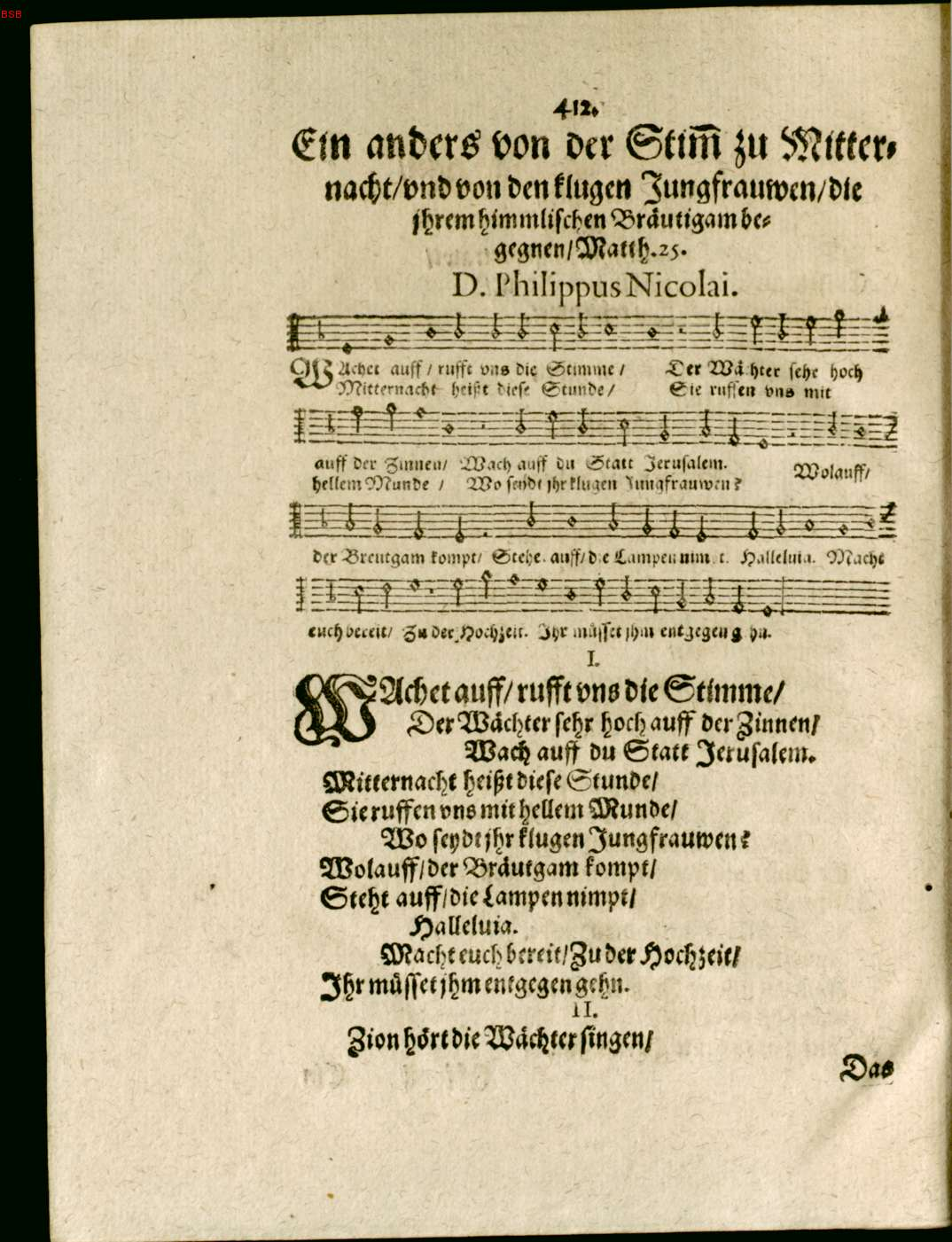
- First publication in Nicolai's 1599 Frewden Spiegel deß ewigen Lebens
- English: "Wake, Awake, for Night Is Flying"
- Other name: Sleepers Awake
- Catalogue: Zahn 8405a
- Related: Chorale cantata by Bach
- Text: by Philipp Nicolai
- Language: German
- Published: 1599

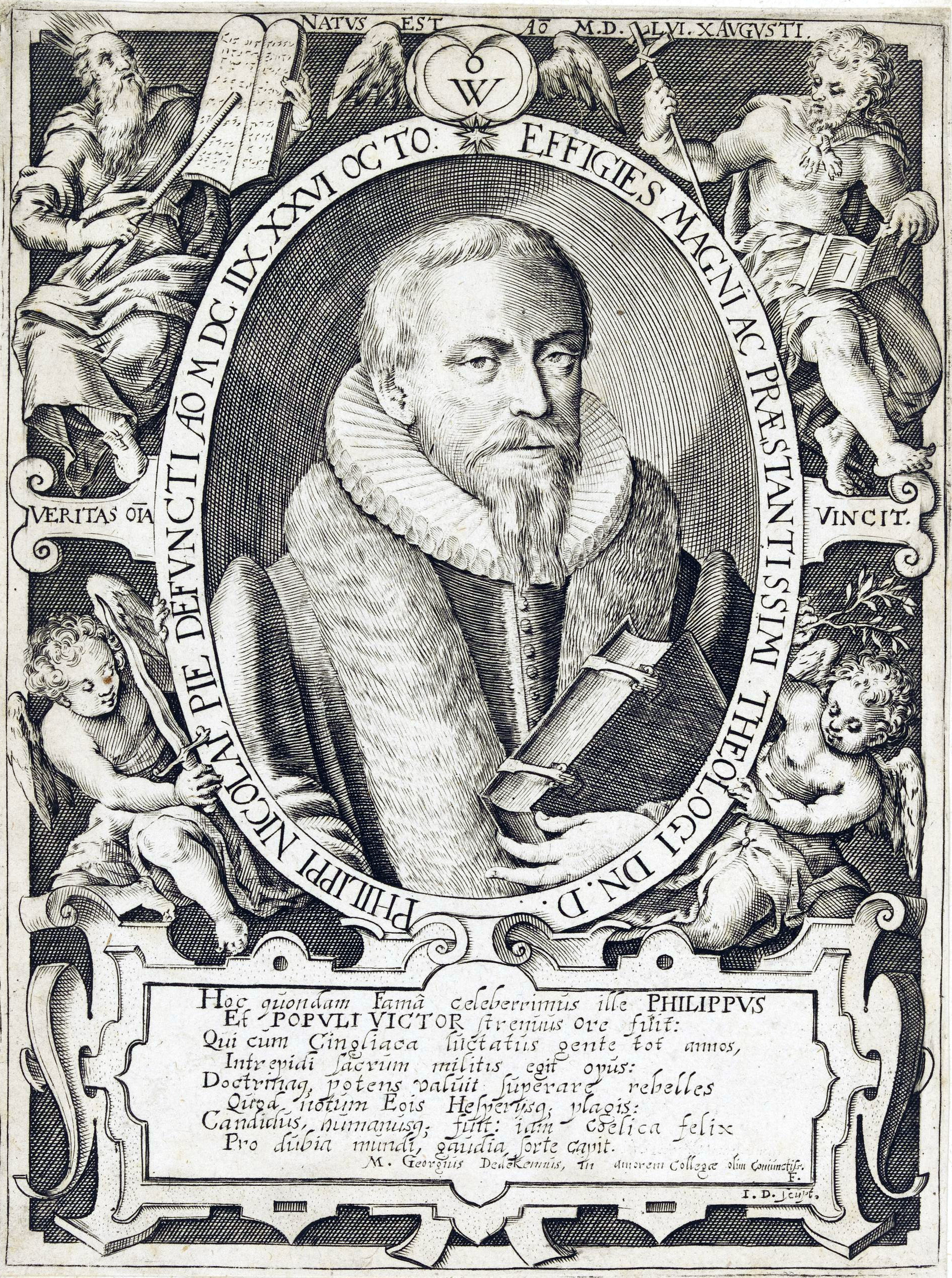
Philipp Nicolai, the hymn writer

"Wachet auf, ruft uns die Stimme" (literally: Wake up, the voice is calling us) is a Lutheran hymn written in German by Philipp Nicolai, first published in 1599 together with "Wie schön leuchtet der Morgenstern". It appears in German hymnals and in several English hymnals in translations such as "Wake, Awake, for Night Is Flying" (Catherine Winkworth, 1858), "Wake, O wake! with tidings thrilling" (Francis Crawford Burkitt, 1906), and "Up! Awake! From Highest Steeple" (George Ratcliffe Woodward, 1908). Johann Sebastian Bach based a chorale cantata on the hymn, Wachet auf, ruft uns die Stimme, BWV 140, one of its many musical settings.

== Nicolai ==
Philipp Nicolai wrote the hymn in 1598, a time when the plague had hit Unna where he lived for six months as a preacher after studies in theology at the University of Wittenberg. The text is based on the Parable of the Ten Virgins (Matthew 25:1–13). Nicolai refers to other biblical ideas, such as from Revelation the mentioning of marriage (Revelation 19:6–9) and the twelve gates, every one of pearl (Revelation 21:21), and from the First Epistle to the Corinthians the phrase "eye hath not seen, nor ear heard" (1 Corinthians 2:9).

In 1599 Nicolai published both the hymn tune, Zahn No. 8405a, and the words to the hymn. Portions of the melody are similar to the older hymn tune "In dulci jubilo" ("In sweet rejoicing") and to "Silberweise" ("Silver Air") by Hans Sachs. In the first publication in Frewden Spiegel deß ewigen Lebens ("Mirror of Joy of the Life Everlasting"), the text was introduced:

Ein anders von der Stimm zu Mitternacht
vnd von den klugen Jungfrauwen
die jhrem himmlischen Bräutigam begegnen
Matth. 25. / D. Philippus Nicolai.

Translation:

Another [call] of the voice at midnight
and of the wise maidens
who meet their celestial Bridegroom
Matthew 25 / D. Philippus Nicolai.

The author wrote in his preface, dated 10 August 1598:

Day by day I wrote out my meditations, found myself, thank God, wonderfully well, comforted in heart, joyful in spirit, and truly content; gave to my manuscript the name and title of a Mirror of Joy... to leave behind me (if God should call me from this world) as a token of my peaceful, joyful, Christian departure, or (if God should spare me in health) to comfort other sufferers whom He should also visit with the pestilence.

Nicolai's former student, Wilhelm Ernst, Count of Waldeck, had died of the plague at the age of fourteen, and Nicolai used the initials of "Graf zu Waldeck" in reverse order as an acrostic to begin the three stanzas: "Wachet auf", "Zion hört die Wächter singen", "Gloria sei dir gesungen".

== Musical settings ==
Dieterich Buxtehude composed two cantatas based on the hymn, BuxWV 100 and BuxWV 101. Johann Sebastian Bach based his chorale cantata Wachet auf, ruft uns die Stimme, BWV 140, on the hymn and derived one of the Schübler Chorales, BWV 645, from the cantata's central movement. His son Johann Christoph Friedrich Bach wrote a cantata for a four-part choir, Wachet auf, ruft uns die Stimme. In Felix Mendelssohn's St. Paul oratorio, Wachet auf features prominently as a chorale and also as the main theme of the overture.

In 1900, Max Reger composed a fantasia for organ on "Wachet auf, ruft uns die Stimme" as the second of Three chorale fantasias, Op. 52. He composed a chorale prelude as No. 41 of his 52 chorale preludes, Op. 67 in 1902. Herbert Blendinger also wrote a chorale fantasia on the hymn, Op. 49.

Norwegian-American composer F. Melius Christiansen composed a famous a capella choral arrangement of the hymn in 1925, titled "Wake, Awake" in English.

Hugo Distler composed an organ partita based on the hymn in 1935 (Op. 8/2).

The following example is the final movement of Bach's cantata, a four-part setting of the final stanza:

== In English ==
Hymnologist John Julian, in his 1907 Dictionary of Hymnology, listed sixteen English translations of this hymn, ten of which were then in common use. The following year, Duncan Campbell reported that "the favourite rendering" was either that of Catherine Winkworth or the one compiled by William Cooke. Both of these translations are titled "Wake, Awake, for Night is Flying"; Cooke's translation is based on Winkworth's and other translations, with additions by Cooke himself.
