= Wilhelm Friedrich Ernst Bach =

German composer, grandson of J. S. Bach

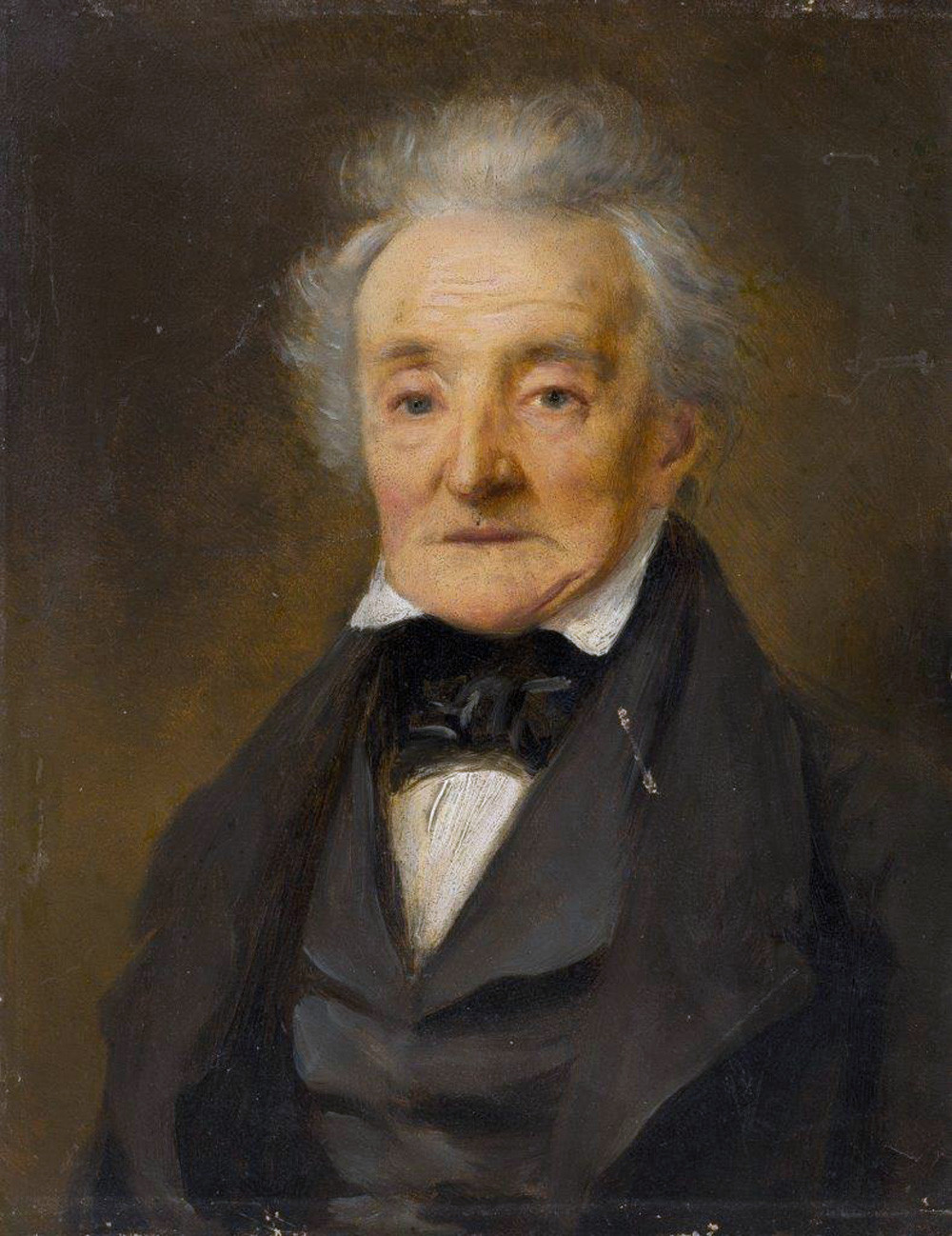
Wilhelm Friedrich Ernst Bach

Wilhelm Friedrich Ernst Bach, also known as William Bach (24 May 1759 – 25 December 1845) was the eldest son of Johann Christoph Friedrich Bach and the only grandson of Johann Sebastian Bach to gain fame as a composer. He was music director to King Frederick William II of Prussia.

Ernst Bach received training in music from his uncle Carl Philipp Emanuel Bach, and from another uncle in England, Johann Christian Bach. He was in London when Johann Christian died there on 1 January 1782. Ernst Bach remained in England until 1784, when he returned to Germany via Holland. He was Kapellmeister of Minden in 1786, and Kapellmeister in Berlin from 1788 to 1811, with Friedrich Wilhelm's blessing. He retired after Prince Heinrich, the brother of King Friedrich Wilhelm III, granted him a pension.

At the unveiling of the Bach Monument in Leipzig on 23 April 1843, Ernst Bach met Felix Mendelssohn and Robert Schumann. Schumann later described Ernst Bach as "a very agile old gentleman of 84 years with snow-white hair and expressive features". Mendelssohn was the one who revived public interest in JS Bach’s music following a 1829 performance of St Matthew Passion. The two would correspond until Ernst Bach’s death.

One of Ernst Bach's most remarkable compositions was Dreyblatt, a concerto for piano involving six hands. It is to be performed by a man with a petite woman on either side of him. Ernst Bach indicated that the man is to stretch his arms around the women to play the outer parts while the women play the middle parts.

Ernst Bach is buried at the Friedhof II der Sophiengemeinde Berlin. He married twice. His only son (by his second wife) died in infancy. The eldest of his three daughters, Caroline Augusta Wilhelmine, lived the longest. She died in 1871—the very last of the Bachs.

== Selected recordings ==
- Kantaten & Sinfonien "Columbus"; Ingrid Schmithüsen, Howard Crook, Gotthold Schwarz, Klaus Mertens, Hermann Max; cpo 999 672-2, 2000
