= Wachet auf, ruft uns die Stimme, BWV 140 =

Chorale cantata by Johann Sebastian Bach

Wachet auf, ruft uns die Stimme
- BWV 140
- Chorale cantata by J. S. Bach
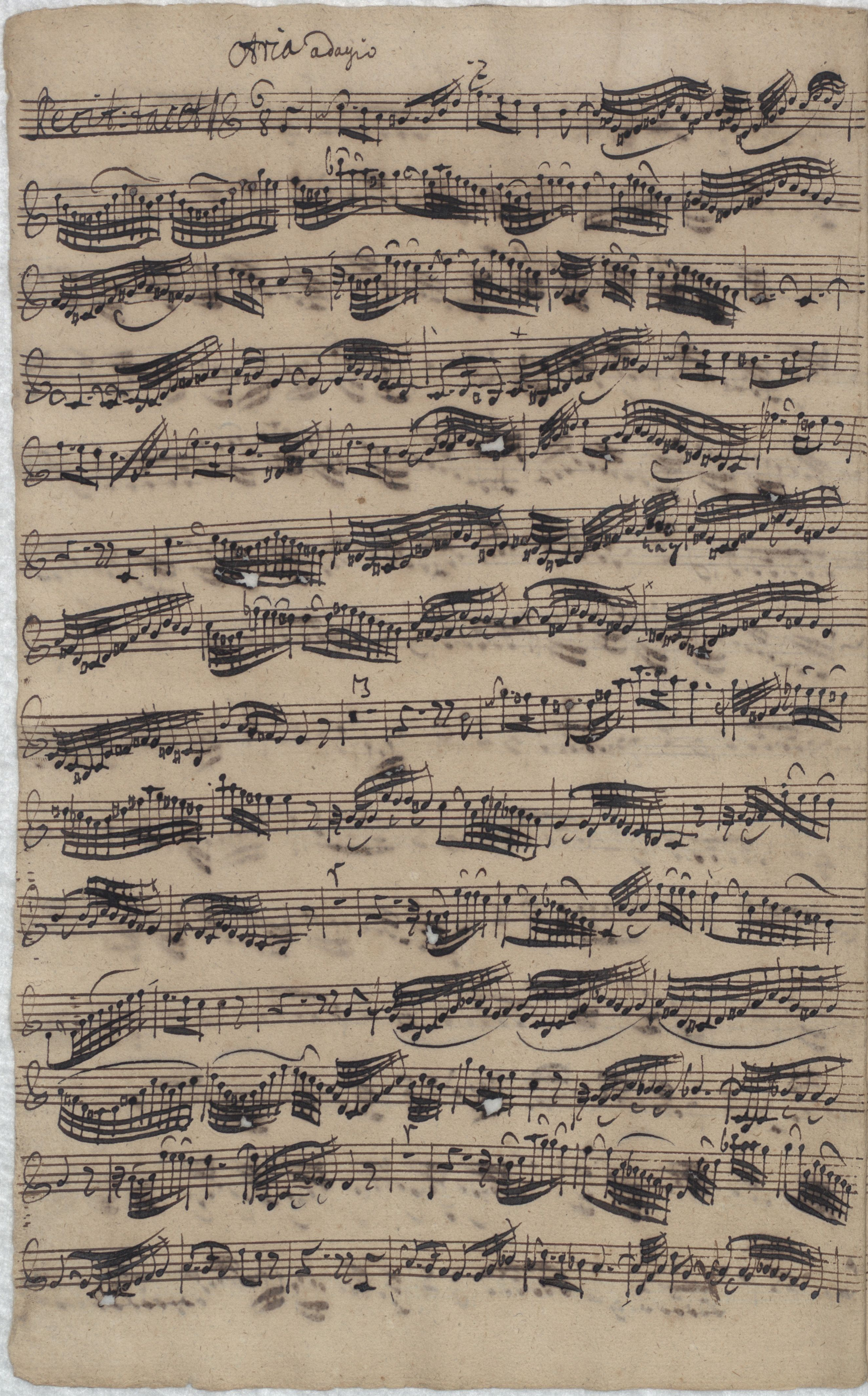
- Autograph manuscript of the obbligato piccolo violino part of the first soprano-bass aria, one of the few surviving instrumental parts written by Bach, from the archives of the Thomaskirche
- Other name: Sleepers Awake
- Occasion: 27th Sunday after Trinity
- Chorale: "Wachet auf, ruft uns die Stimme" by Philipp Nicolai
- Performed: 25 November 1731: Leipzig
- Movements: 7
- Vocal: SATB choir; soprano, tenor and bass solo
- Instrumental: horn; 2 oboes; taille; bassoon; violino piccolo; 2 violins; viola; continuo

Wachet auf, ruft uns die Stimme ('Awake, calls the voice to us'), BWV 140, also known as Sleepers Awake, is a church cantata by Johann Sebastian Bach, regarded as one of his most mature and popular sacred cantatas. He composed the chorale cantata in Leipzig for the 27th Sunday after Trinity and first performed it on 25 November 1731.

Bach composed this cantata to complete his second annual cycle of chorale cantatas, begun in 1724. The cantata is based on the hymn in three stanzas "Wachet auf, ruft uns die Stimme" (1599) by Philipp Nicolai, which covers the prescribed reading for the Sunday, the parable of the Ten Virgins. The text and tune of the three stanzas of the hymn appears unchanged in three of seven movements (1, 4 and 7). The chorale texts were arranged by Picander. An unknown author supplied additional poetry for the inner movements as sequences of recitative and duet, based on the love poetry of the Song of Songs. Bach structured the cantata in seven movements, setting the first stanza as a chorale fantasia, the second stanza in the central movement in the style of a chorale prelude, and the third stanza as a four-part chorale. He set the new texts as dramatic recitatives and love-duets, similar to contemporary opera. Bach scored the work for three vocal soloists (soprano, tenor and bass), a four-part choir and a Baroque instrumental ensemble consisting of a horn (to reinforce the soprano), two oboes, taille, violino piccolo, strings and basso continuo including bassoon.

Bach used the central movement of the cantata as the basis for the first of his Schübler Chorales, BWV 645. Bach scholar Alfred Dürr notes that the cantata is an expression of Christian mysticism in art, while William G. Whittaker calls it "a cantata without weaknesses, without a dull bar, technically, emotionally and spiritually of the highest order, its sheer perfection and its boundless imagination rouse one's wonder time and time again".

== History, hymn and text ==
Bach composed the cantata in Leipzig for the 27th Sunday after Trinity. This Sunday occurs only when Easter is early. The prescribed readings for the Sunday were from the First Epistle to the Thessalonians, be prepared for the day of the Lord (1 Thessalonians 5:1–11), and from the Gospel of Matthew, the parable of the Ten Virgins (Matthew 25:1–13).

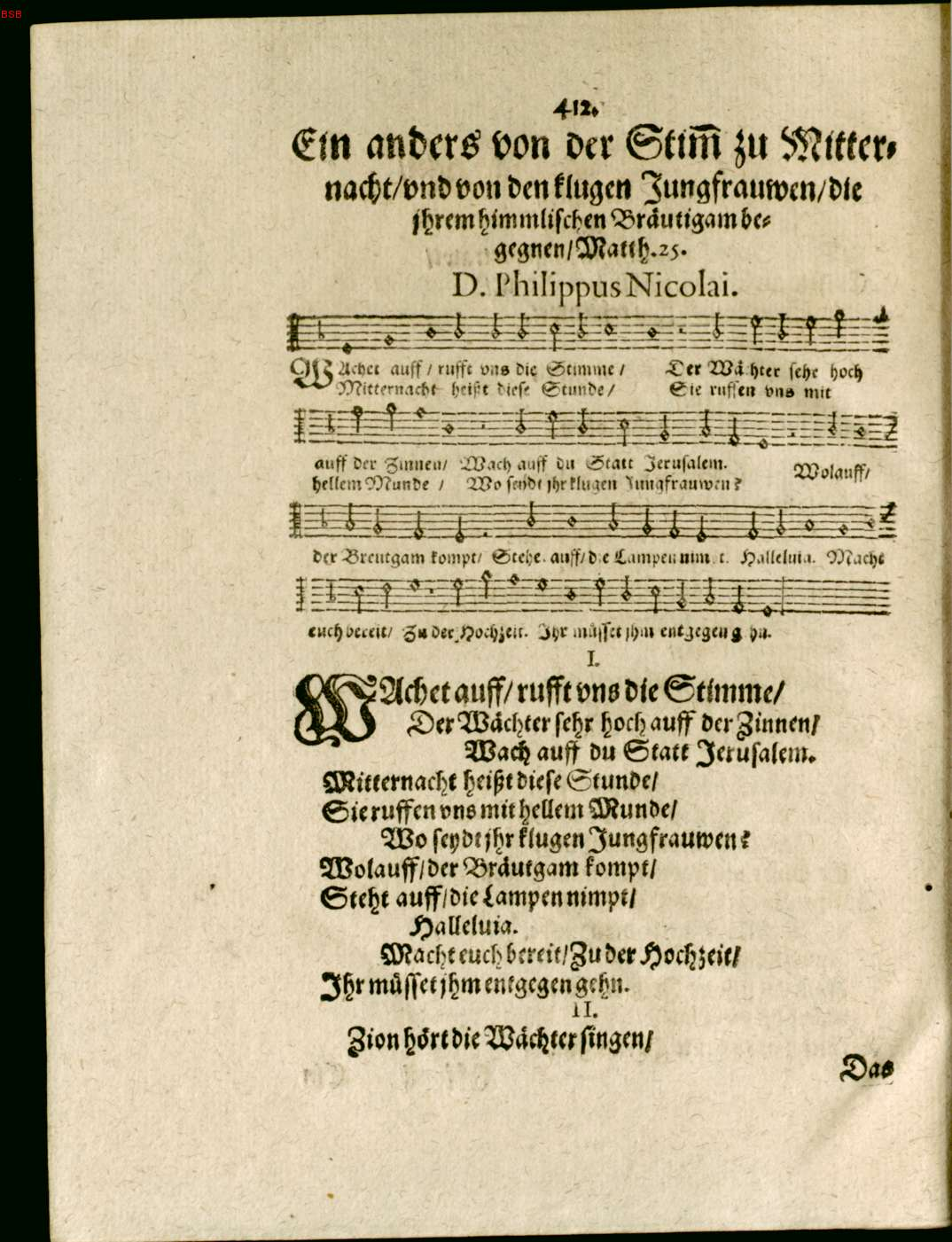
The hymn in the first publication, 1599

Bach composed this cantata to complete his second annual cycle of cantatas of 1724/25, a cycle planned to be of chorale cantatas. It is based on Philipp Nicolai's Lutheran hymn in three stanzas, "Wachet auf, ruft uns die Stimme", which is based on the Gospel. Published in Nicolai's FrewdenSpiegel deß ewigen Lebens (Mirror of Joy of the Life Everlasting) in 1599, its text was introduced: "Ein anders von der Stimm zu Mitternacht / vnd von den klugen Jungfrauwen / die jhrem himmlischen Bräutigam begegnen / Matth. 25. / D. Philippus Nicolai." (Another [call] of the voice at midnight and of the wise maidens who meet their celestial Bridegroom / Matthew 25 / D. Philippus Nicolai).

The text of the three stanzas appears unchanged and with the melody in the outer movements and the central movements (1, 4 and 7), while an unknown author supplied poetry for the other movements, twice a sequence of recitative and duet. He refers to the love poetry of the Song of Songs, showing Jesus as the bridegroom of the Soul. According to the Bach scholar Christoph Wolff, the text was already available when Bach composed his cycle of chorale cantatas.

=== Performance history ===
Bach performed the cantata in Leipzig's main church Nikolaikirche on 25 November 1731. According to Wolff, Bach performed it only this one time, although the 27th Sunday after Trinity occurred one more time during his tenure in Leipzig, in 1742. Bach used the central movement as the basis for the first of his Schübler Chorales, BWV 645. The cantata was revived by the Thomanerchor around 1755 under the joint directorship of Barth and Penzel. Both men were born after the premiere of the work.

As the text and its eschatological themes are also associated with Advent, the cantata is commonly performed during that season.

=== Publication ===
The cantata was published in 1881 as part of the first complete edition of the composer's work, the Bach Gesamtausgabe.

== Music ==
=== Structure and scoring ===
Bach structured the cantata in seven movements. The text and tune of the hymn are kept in the outer choral movements and the central movement, set as two chorale fantasias and a four-part closing chorale, which frame two sequences of recitative and aria. Bach scored the work for three vocal soloists (soprano (S), tenor (T), bass (B)), a four-part choir, (SATB) and a Baroque instrumental ensemble of horn (Co), two oboes (Ob), taille (Ot), violino piccolo (Vp), two violins (Vl), viola (Va), and basso continuo including bassoon. The heading of the original parts reads: "Dominica 27. post Trinit. / Wachet auf, rufft uns die Stime / â / 4. Voc. / 1. Violino picolo. / 2. Hautbois. / Taille. / Basson. / 2 Violini. / Viola. / e / Continuo. / di Signore / J.S.Bach." The duration is given as 31 minutes.

In the following table of the movements, the scoring follows the Neue Bach-Ausgabe. The keys and time signatures are taken from the book on all cantatas by the Bach scholar Alfred Dürr, using the symbol for common time (4/4). The continuo, playing throughout, is not shown.

Movements of Wachet auf, ruft uns die Stimme
No.	Title	Text	Type	Vocal	Winds	Strings	Key	Time
1	Wachet auf, ruft uns die Stimme	Nicolai	Chorale fantasia	SATB	Co 2Ob Ot	Vp 2Vl Va	E♭ major	3/4
2	Er kommt	anon.	Recitative	T			C minor	common time
3	Wann kommst du, mein Heil?	anon.	Duet	S B		Vp	C minor	6/8
4	Zion hört die Wächter singen	Nicolai	Chorale	T		2Vl Va (unis.)	E♭ major	common time
5	So geh herein zu mir	anon	Recitative	B		Vp 2Vl Va		common time
6	Mein Freund ist mein!	anon.	Duet	S B	Ob		B♭ major	common time
7	Gloria sei dir gesungen	Nicolai	Chorale	SATB	Co 2Ob Ot	Vp 2Vl Va	E♭ major	common time

=== Movements ===
==== 1 ====
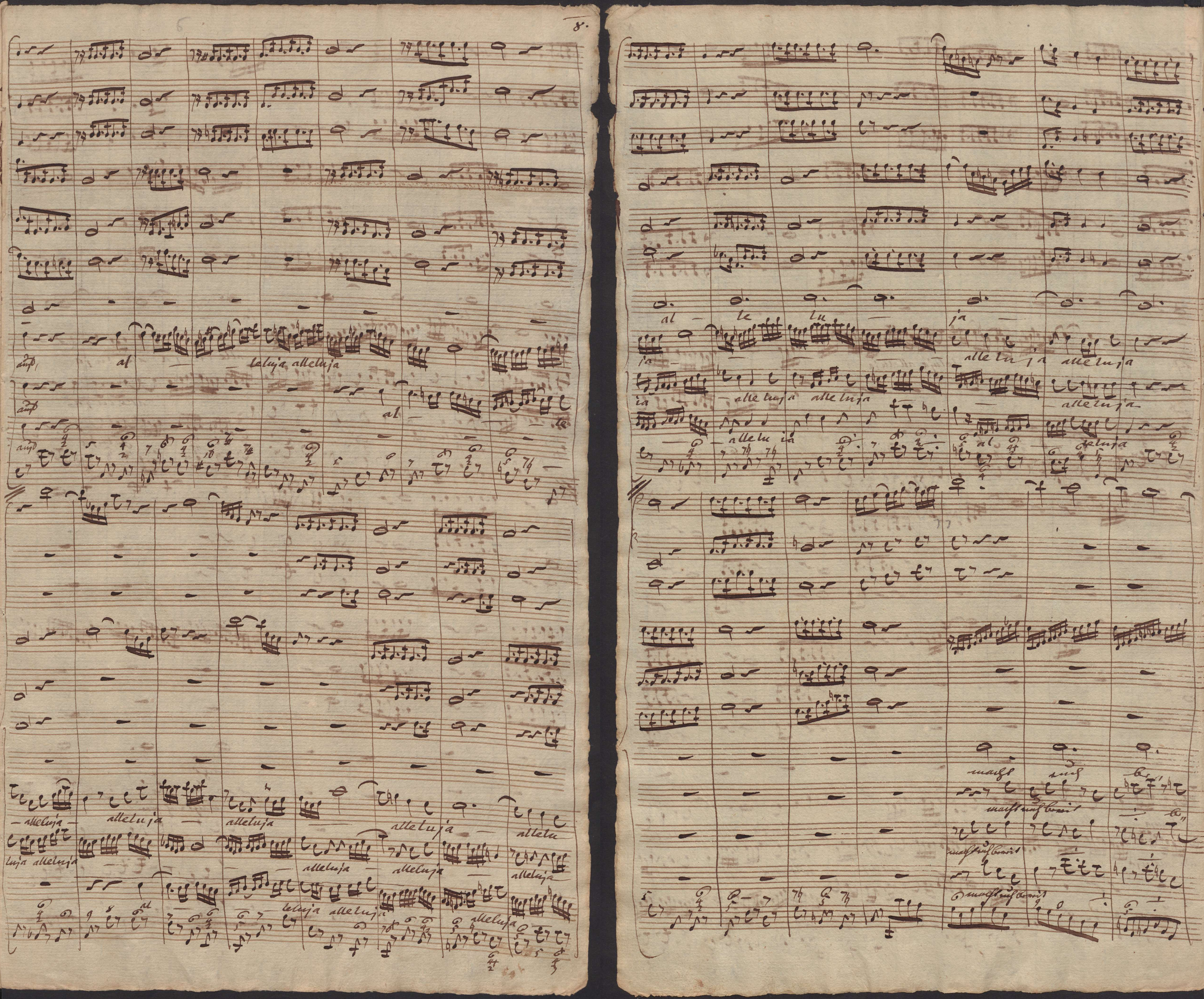
In the first movement, the ninth chorale-line starts with a fugato alleluja in the altos, tenors and basses culminating in the cantus firmus in the sopranos. Manuscript copied by C. F. Barth, c 1755

The first movement, "Wachet auf, ruft uns die Stimme" ("Awake", we are called by the voice [of the watchmen]), is a chorale fantasia based on the first verse of the hymn, a common feature of Bach's earlier chorale cantatas. The cantus firmus is sung by the soprano. The orchestra plays independent material mainly based on two motifs: a dotted rhythm and an ascending scale "with syncopated accent shifts". The lower voices add in unusually free polyphonic music images such as the frequent calls "wach auf!" (wake up!) and "wo, wo?" (where, where?), and long melismas in a fugato on "Halleluja".

John Eliot Gardiner, who conducted the Bach Cantata Pilgrimage in 2000, notes two instrumental choirs, the strings and the double-reeds (two oboes, taille and bassoon), playing in the style of a French overture double-dotted motifs in triple rhythm. He writes:

From this a rising syncopated figure emerges, taken up later on by the altos as they lead off with their funky 'alleluia' figure and adopted by all the other singers. If anyone in the posh world of classical music ever doubted that JS Bach could also be considered the father of jazz, here is the proof.

==== 2 ====
"Er kommt" (He comes), is a recitative for tenor as a narrator who calls the "Töchter Zions" (daughters of Zion).

==== 3 ====
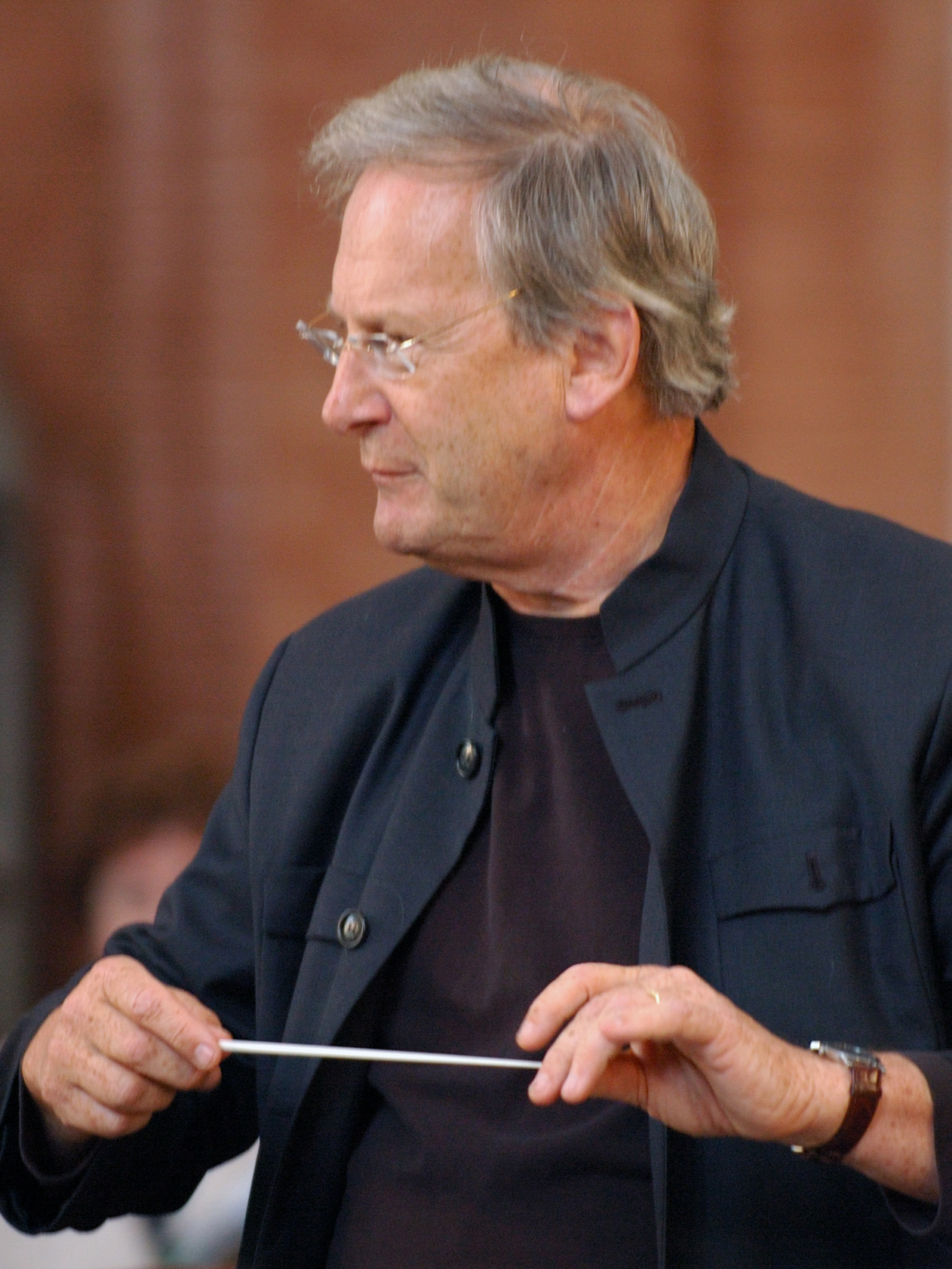
John Eliot Gardiner, who conducted the Bach Cantata Pilgrimage, in 2007

In the following duet, "Wann kommst du, mein Heil?" (When are You coming, my Salvation?), with obbligato violino piccolo, the soprano represents the Soul and the bass is the vox Christi (voice of Jesus). In a slow siciliano, the violino piccolo illustrates "the flickering of lamps 'lit with burning oil'" in arabesques. Gardiner comments: "A rich tradition of similarly sensual musical allegories, including fine examples by Bach's own cousin, Johann Christoph, stands behind this ravishing number."

==== 4 ====
The fourth movement, "Zion hört die Wächter singen" (Zion hears the watchmen singing), is based on the second verse of the hymn. It is written in the style of a chorale prelude, with the phrases of the chorale, sung as a cantus firmus by the tenors (or by the tenor soloist), entering intermittently against a famously lyrical melody played in unison by the violins (without the violino piccolo) and the viola, accompanied by the basso continuo.

Bach later transcribed this movement for organ (BWV 645), and it was subsequently published along with five other transcriptions Bach made of his cantata movements as the Schübler Chorales.

==== 5 ====
The fifth movement, "So geh herein zu mir" (Then come in to me), is a recitative for bass, accompanied by the strings. It pictures the unity of the bridegroom and the "chosen bride".

==== 6 ====
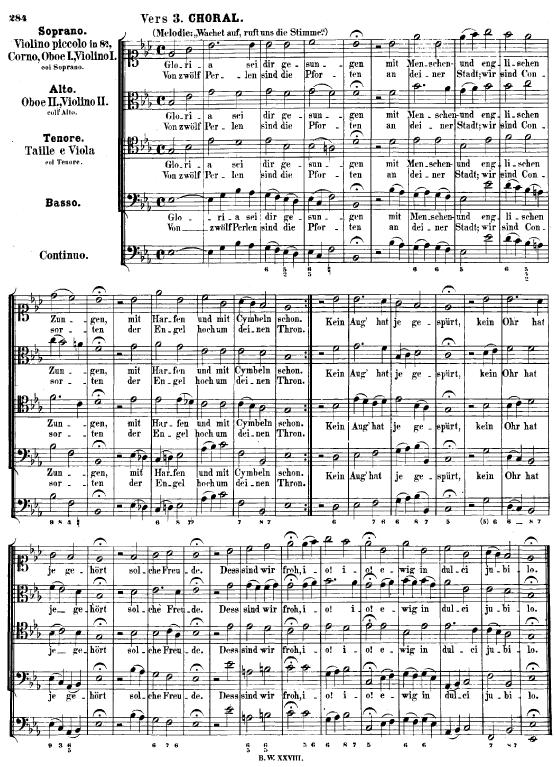
The third stanza as the closing chorale

The sixth movement, "Mein Freund ist mein!" (My Friend is mine!), is another duet for soprano and bass with obbligato oboe. This duet, like the third movement, is a love duet between the soprano Soul and the bass Jesus. Gardiner notes that Bach echoes the means of "contemporary operatic love-duets in his use of chains of suspensions and parallel thirds and sixths". Dürr describes it as giving "expression to the joy of the united pair", showing a "relaxed mood" in "artistic intensity".

==== 7 ====
The closing chorale, "Gloria sei dir gesungen" (Let Gloria be sung to You), is a four-part setting of the third verse of the hymn. The high pitch of the melody is doubled by a violino piccolo an octave higher, representing the bliss of the "heavenly Jerusalem".

=== Evaluation ===
The Bach scholar Klaus Hofmann sees the cantata as one of the composer's "most beautiful, most mature and, at the same time, most popular sacred cantatas". Dürr notes that the cantata, especially the duets in a unity of "earthly happiness in love and heavenly bliss", are an expression of Christian mysticism in art. William G. Whittaker wrote: "It is a cantata without weaknesses, without a dull bar, technically, emotionally and spiritually of the highest order, its sheer perfection and its boundless imagination rouse one's wonder time and time again."

== Recordings ==
The listing is taken from the selection on the Bach Cantatas Website. Choirs singing OVPP (one voice per part) and instrumental groups playing period instruments in historically informed performances are marked by green background.

Recordings of Wachet auf, ruft uns die Stimme
Title	Conductor / Choir / Orchestra	Soloists	Label	Year	Choir type	Instr.
Les Grandes Cantates de J. S. Bach Vol. 4	Fritz Werner Heinrich-Schütz-Chor Heilbronn Pforzheim Chamber Orchestra	Ingeborg Reichelt; Helmut Krebs; Franz Kelch	Erato	1959		
Bach Made in Germany Vol. 2 – Cantatas IV	Kurt Thomas Thomanerchor Gewandhausorchester	Elisabeth Grümmer; Hans-Joachim Rotzsch; Theo Adam	Eterna	1960		
J. S. Bach: Cantata No. 140, Cantata No. 57	Karl Ristenpart Chorus of the Conservatory of Sarrebruck Chamber Orchestra of the Saar	Ursula Buckel; Jakob Stämpfli	Accord	1962		
J. S. Bach: Cantatas BWV 140 & BWV 148	Wolfgang Gönnenwein Süddeutscher Madrigalchor Consortium Musicum	Elly Ameling; Theo Altmeyer; Hans Sotin	EMI	1967		
Les Grandes Cantates de J.S. Bach Vol. 24	Fritz Werner Heinrich-Schütz-Chor Heilbronn Pforzheim Chamber Orchestra	Hedy Graf; Kurt Huber; Jakob Stämpfli	Erato	1970		
Wachet auf, ruft uns die Stimme. BWV 140. Magnificat BMV 243	Karl Richter Münchener Bach-Chor Münchener Bach-Orchester	Edith Mathis; Peter Schreier; Dietrich Fischer-Dieskau	Deutsche Grammophon	1979		
Die Bach Kantate Vol. 6	Helmuth Rilling Gächinger Kantorei Württembergisches Kammerorchester Heilbronn	Arleen Augér; Aldo Baldin; Philippe Huttenlocher	Hänssler	1984		
J. S. Bach: Das Kantatenwerk • Complete Cantatas • Les Cantates, Folge / Vol. 35 – BWV 140, 143–146	Nikolaus Harnoncourt Tölzer Knabenchor Concentus Musicus Wien	boy soprano Alan Bergius; Kurt Equiluz; Thomas Hampson	Teldec	1984		Period
J. S. Bach: Cantatas BWV 140 & BWV 51	Joshua Rifkin The Bach Ensemble	Julianne Baird; Drew Minter; Jeffrey Thomas; Jan Opalach	L'Oiseau-Lyre	1986	OVPP	Period
J. S. Bach: Cantatas (27th Sunday after Trinity)	John Eliot Gardiner Monteverdi Choir English Baroque Soloists	Ruth Holton; Anthony Rolfe Johnson; Stephen Varcoe	Archiv Produktion	1990		Period
J. Ch. F. Bach / J. S. Bach: Wachet auf, ruft uns die Stimme	Heinz Hennig Knabenchor Hannover Barockorchester L'Arco	Marietta Zumbült; Jan Kobow; Peter Frank	Thorofon	1995	OVPP	Period
Bach Edition Vol. 15 – Cantatas Vol. 8	Pieter Jan Leusink Holland Boys Choir Netherlands Bach Collegium	Ruth Holton; Nico van der Meel; Bas Ramselaar	Brilliant Classics	2000		Period
J. S. Bach: Complete Cantatas Vol. 21	Ton Koopman Amsterdam Baroque Orchestra & Choir	Sandrine Piau; James Gilchrist; Klaus Mertens	Antoine Marchand	2003		Period
Bach: Wie schön leuchtet der Morgenstern – Cantata BWV 1, 48, 78 & 140	Karl-Friedrich Beringer Windsbacher Knabenchor Deutsche Kammer-Virtuosen Berlin	Sibylla Rubens; Markus Schäfer; Klaus Mertens	Sony Music	2011		
J.S. Bach: Kantate BWV 140 "Wachet auf, ruft uns die Stimme" (Bachkantaten N°6)	Rudolf Lutz Orchestra of the J.S. Bach Foundation	Nuria Rial; Bernhard Berchthold; Markus Volpert	J.S. Bach-Stiftung St. Gallen	2008		Period
J. S. Bach: Cantatas Vol. 52 – Wachet auf, ruft uns die Stimme, Cantatas · 29 · 112 · 140	Masaaki Suzuki Bach Collegium Japan	Hana Blažíková; Gerd Türk; Peter Kooy	BIS	2011		Period
