= Johann Christoph Friedrich Bach =

German musician and composer (1732-1795)

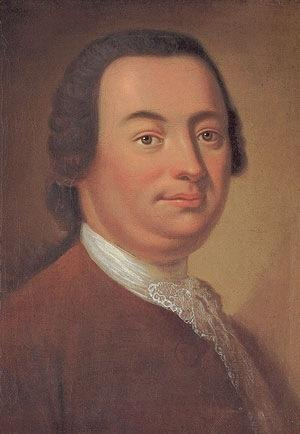
- Portrait of Bach, by Georg David Matthieu, 1774
- Born: 21 June 1732; Leipzig
- Died: 26 January 1795 (aged 62); Bückeburg
- Occupations: Harpsichordist; Composer

Johann Christoph Friedrich Bach (21 June 1732 – 26 January 1795) was a German composer and harpsichordist, the fifth son of Johann Sebastian Bach, sometimes referred to as the "Bückeburg Bach".

Born in Leipzig in the Electorate of Saxony, he was taught music by his father, and also tutored by his distant cousin Johann Elias Bach. He studied at the St. Thomas School, and some believe he studied law at the university there, but there is no record of this. In 1750, William, Count of Schaumburg-Lippe appointed Johann Christoph harpsichordist at Bückeburg, and in 1759, he became concertmaster. While there, Bach collaborated with Johann Gottfried Herder, who provided the texts for six vocal works; the music survives for only four of these.

Bach wrote keyboard sonatas, symphonies, oratorios, liturgical choir pieces and motets, operas and songs. Because of Count Wilhelm's predilection for Italian music, Bach had to adapt his style accordingly, but he retained stylistic traits of the music of his father and of his brother, C. P. E. Bach.

He married the singer Lucia Elisabeth Münchhausen (1732–1803) in 1755 and the Count stood as godfather to his son Wilhelm Friedrich Ernst Bach. J.C.F. educated his son in music as his own father had, and Wilhelm Friedrich Ernst went on to become music director to Frederick William II of Prussia.

In April 1778 he and Wilhelm travelled to England to visit Johann Christian Bach. J. C. F. Bach died in 1795 in Bückeburg, aged 62.

== Assessment ==
The 1911 Encyclopædia Britannica says of him: "He was an industrious composer, ... whose work reflects no discredit on the family name." He was an outstanding virtuoso of the keyboard, with a reasonably wide repertory of surviving works, including twenty symphonies, the later ones influenced by Haydn and Mozart; hardly a genre of vocal music was neglected by him.

A significant portion of J. C. F. Bach's output was lost in the World War II destruction of the Staatliches Institut für Musikforschung in Berlin, where the scores had been on deposit since 1917. Musicologists Hansdieter Wohlfahrth, who catalogued his works, and Ulrich Leisinger, consider Bach a transitional figure in the mold of his half-brother C. P. E., his brother Johann Christian, the Grauns (Carl and Johann), and Georg Philipp Telemann, with some works in the style of the high Baroque, some in a galant idiom, and still others which combine elements of the two, along with traits of the nascent classical style.

== Works ==
"BR-JCFB" denotes "Bach-Repertorium Johann Christoph Friedrich Bach". "Wf" denotes "wohlfahrt verzeichnis". Bach Digital Work (BDW) pages contain information about individual compositions.

=== Keyboard works ===
Two Sonatas from "Musikalisches Vielerley" collection of works made by CPE Bach – not after 1770.

- BR-JCFB A 1. Keyboard Sonata in F major (Wf XI/1)
- BR-JCFB A 2. Keyboard Sonata in C major (Wf XI/2)

"Six easy Sonatas for Clavier or Pianoforte" – composed before December 26, 1783.

- BR-JCFB A 3. No. 1 – Keyboard Sonata in C major (Wf XI/3.1)
- BR-JCFB A 4. No. 2 – Keyboard Sonata in F major (Wf XI/3.2)
- BR-JCFB A 5. No. 3 – Keyboard Sonata in E major (Wf XI/3.3)
- BR-JCFB A 6. No. 4 – Keyboard Sonata in D major (Wf XI/3.4)
- BR-JCFB A 7. No. 5 – Keyboard Sonata in A major (Wf XI/3.5)
- BR A 8. Keyboard Sonata in E♭ major (Wf XI/3.6)

Three Sonatas and Sonatina from "Musikalische Nebenstunden" Collection of works made by JCF Bach – Not after 1787/88

- BR-JCFB A 9. Keyboard Sonata in C major (Wf XI/4)
- BR-JCFB A 10. Keyboard Sonata in G major (Wf XI/5)
- BR-JCFB A 11. Keyboard Sonata in F major (Wf XI/6)
- BR-JCFB A 12. Keyboard Sonatina in A minor (Wf XI/7)

"Three easy Sonatas for Clavier of Pianoforte" – composed before October 1788, published in 1789

- BR-JCFB A 13. No. 1 – Keyboard Sonata in D major (Wf XI/8.1)
- BR-JCFB A 14. No. 2 – Keyboard Sonata in A major (Wf XI/8.2)
- BR-JCFB A 15. No. 3 – Keyboard Sonata in E major (Wf XI/8.3)

Six easy Sonatas – composed around 1785 – perhaps composed for Christoph Ernst Abraham Albrecht von Boineburg, at that time the judiciary in Rinteln.

- BR-JCFB A 16. No. 1 – Keyboard Sonata in D major
- BR-JCFB A 17. No. 2 – Keyboard Sonata in A major
- BR-JCFB A 18. No. 3 – Keyboard Sonata in F major (Wf XI/9)
- BR-JCFB A 19. No. 4 – Keyboard Sonata in B♭ major
- BR-JCFB A 20. No. 5 – Keyboard Sonata in G major
- BR-JCFB A 21. No. 6 – Keyboard Sonata in E♭ major

Six Sonatas – composed around 1785 – probably like A 16 – 21 for C.E.A.A von Boineburg.

- BR-JCFB A 22 – 25. 4 Keyboard Sonatas (lost)
- BR-JCFB A 26. No. 5 – Keyboard Sonata in E♭ major
- BR-JCFB A 27. No. 6 – Keyboard Sonata in F major

Seven Sonatas – Composed before around and not after March 1789, only one Sonata survived.

- BR-JCFB A 28–30, A 32–34. 6 Keyboard Sonatas (lost)
- BR-JCFB A 31. Keyboard Sonata in D major
- BR-JCFB A 35 – 37. 3 Keyboard Sonatas (lost)
- BR-JCFB A 38 – 39. 2 Keyboard Sonatas (lost)
- BR-JCFB A 40. keyboard Sonata for 4 hands in A major (Wf XIII/1) – around 1786
- BR-JCFB A 41. keyboard Sonata for 4 hands in C major (Wf XIII/2) – perhaps around 1791
- BR-JCFB A 42 – 43. 2 Sonatas for 2 keyboards (lost)
- BR-JCFB A 44. Variations in A major (Wf XII/1) (lost)
- BR-JCFB A 45. Allegretto in G major with 18 Variations on "Ah vous dirais-je Maman" (Wf XII/2) – Composed around 1785/90 – originally comprised only 13 variations and was later expanded by 5 variations.

Five Pieces from "Musikalisches Vielerley" – not after 1770

- BR-JCFB A 46. Minuet for dance and Trio in D major (Wf XII/3)
- BR-JCFB A 47. Alla polacca in G major (Wf XII/7)
- BR-JCFB A 48. Minuet and Trio in F major (Wf XII/4)
- BR-JCFB A 49. Two minuets for dance in D major (Wf XII/5)
- BR-JCFB A 50. Alla polacca in F major (Wf XII/6)

Seventy pieces from "Musikalische Nebenstunden" – The keyboard pieces belong to different genre traditions and are likely to come from different creative periods. (Wf XII/13)

- BR-JCFB A 51. Allegro in C major
- BR-JCFB A 52. Minuet in C major (BWV deest)
- BR-JCFB A 53. Andante in G major
- BR-JCFB A 54. March in G major
- BR-JCFB A 55. Allegretto in F major
- BR-JCFB A 56. Minuet alternating between F major and B♭ major
- BR-JCFB A 57. Polonaise in F major
- BR-JCFB A 58. Allegretto in D major
- BR-JCFB A 59. March in D major
- BR-JCFB A 60. Schwäbisch (Swabian) in D major (kind of folk dance)
- BR-JCFB A 61. Minuet in D major and Trio in G major
- BR-JCFB A 62. Angloise in G major
- BR-JCFB A 63. Villanella in C major
- BR-JCFB A 64. Scherzo in C major
- BR-JCFB A 65. Allegro moderato in G major
- BR-JCFB A 66. Minuet in G major and Trio in C major
- BR-JCFB A 67. Polonaise in G major
- BR-JCFB A 68. March in G major
- BR-JCFB A 69. Angloise and trio in G major
- BR-JCFB A 70. Allegro F major
- BR-JCFB A 71. Schwäbisch F major
- BR-JCFB A 72. Minuet in F major and Trio in B♭ major
- BR-JCFB A 73. Allegro in D minor
- BR-JCFB A 74. Angloise in F major
- BR-JCFB A 75. Minuet in C major
- BR-JCFB A 76. March in G major
- BR-JCFB A 77. March in D major and Trio in G major
- BR-JCFB A 78. Allegro in G major
- BR-JCFB A 79. Minuet and Trio in G major
- BR-JCFB A 80. Allegro in B♭ major
- BR-JCFB A 81. Villanella in D major
- BR-JCFB A 82. Angloise in D major and Trio in G major
- BR-JCFB A 83. March in G major
- BR-JCFB A 84. Villanella in B♭ major
- BR-JCFB A 85. Angloise in B♭ major
- BR-JCFB A 86. Presto in G minor
- BR-JCFB A 87. Allegro in E♭ major
- BR-JCFB A 88. Adagio in C minor
- BR-JCFB A 89. March in E♭ major
- BR-JCFB A 90. Minuet in E♭ major and Trio in B♭ major
- BR-JCFB A 91. Polonaise in E♭ major
- BR-JCFB A 92. Angloise in E♭ major and Trio in B♭ major
- BR-JCFB A 93. March in E♭ major
- BR-JCFB A 94. Minuet alternating between E♭ major and C minor
- BR-JCFB A 95. Allegro in E minor
- BR-JCFB A 96. Minuet alternating between A major and E major
- BR-JCFB A 97. Angloise in D major
- BR-JCFB A 98. Angloise in D major
- BR-JCFB A 99. Minuet in D major and Trio in A major
- BR-JCFB A 100. Musette in G major
- BR-JCFB A 101. Solfeggio in G major
- BR-JCFB A 102. Angloise in D major
- BR-JCFB A 103. Minuet in G major and Trio in D major
- BR-JCFB A 104. Polonaise in D major
- BR-JCFB A 105. March in D major
- BR-JCFB A 106. Andante in E major
- BR-JCFB A 107. Angloise in A major
- BR-JCFB A 108. Solfeggio in D major
- BR-JCFB A 109. Angloise in G major
- BR-JCFB A 110. March in B♭ major
- BR-JCFB A 111. Schwäbisch in F major
- BR-JCFB A 112. Angloise in B♭ major
- BR-JCFB A 113. Schwäbisch in D major
- BR-JCFB A 114. Polonaise in E♭ major
- BR-JCFB A 115. Minuet in E♭ major and Trio in B♭ major
- BR-JCFB A 116. Schwäbisch in C major
- BR-JCFB A 117. Minuet and Trio in C major
- BR-JCFB A 118. Angloise in F major
- BR-JCFB A 119. Alla Polacca in C major
- BR-JCFB A 120. Minuet in F major and Trio in F minor

Five Pieces – composed around 1745/49, at least before taking up service in Bückeburg.

- BR-JCFB A 121. Polonaise in G major (Wf XII/8)
- BR-JCFB A 122. Minuet in F major (Wf XII/9)
- BR-JCFB A 123. Polonaise in F major (Wf XII/10)
- BR-JCFB A 124. Minuet in G major (Wf XII/11)
- BR-JCFB A 125. Minuet in A major (Wf XII/12)
- BR-JCFB A Inc1. Partia (Allegro) in C major – around 1745 (BWV deest)

Six fugues – published under Telemann name – not after 1758

- BR-JCFB A Inc2. Fugue for keyboard in G minor (lost) – based on G minor fugue from WTC I by JS Bach
- BR-JCFB A Inc3. Fugue for keyboard in E minor (lost)
- BR-JCFB A Inc4. Fugue for keyboard in C major (lost)
- BR-JCFB A Inc5. Fugue for keyboard in F major (TWV 30:27) – based on fugue – Wq 119.3 by CPEB
- BR-JCFB A Inc6. Fugue for keyboard in D major (lost)
- BR-JCFB A Inc7. Fugue for keyboard in C major (lost)
- BR-JCFB A Inc8. Galanterie-Stücke for keyboard

=== Chamber music ===
The "Sonatas" denotes the Trio Sonata form.

- BR-JCFB B 1. Cello Sola in A major (Wf X/3)(1770)
- BR-JCFB B 2. Cello Solo in G major (Wf X/1)
- BR-JCFB B 3a. Trio for traverso flute, violin & bc in A major (Wf VII/1)
- BR-JCFB B 3b. Trio for traverso flute and keyboard in A major (Wf VII/1)
- BR-JCFB B 4. Trio for flute, viola & bc in E minor
- BR-JCFB B 5 – 10. Six Trios for two Flutes and Basso continuo – composed by May 1, 1770 – lost.

Two trios for two Violins and Basso Continuo – Composed before December 23, 1768.

- BR-JCFB B 11. Trio for 2 violins & b.c. in A major (Wf VII/2)
- BR-JCFB B 12. Trio for 2 violins & b.c. in F major (Wf VII/3)
- BR-JCFB B 13. Trio for 2 violins & b.c. (lost)
- BR-JCFB B 14. Trio for keyboard and violin/flute in E♭ major (Wf VIII/2)

Six Sonatas for Keyboard and flute (violin) – one of the most widely performed work by composer – published 1777

- BR-JCFB B 15. Flute Sonata No. 1 in D minor (Wf VIII/3.1)
- BR-JCFB B 16. Flute Sonata No. 2 in D major (Wf VIII/3.2) – two versions 16a and 16b.
- BR-JCFB B 17. Flute Sonata No. 3 in C major (Wf VIII/3.3)
- BR-JCFB B 18. Flute Sonata No. 4 in C major (Wf VIII/3.4) – two versions 18a and 18b.
- BR-JCFB B 19. Flute Sonata No. 5 in A major (Wf VIII/3.5)
- BR-JCFB B 20. Flute Sonata No. 6 in C major (Wf VIII/3.6)

versions 16b and 18b were versions made after the published collection, meaning that 16a and 18a are those found in the collection Two Sonatas for keyboard and violin from Musikalische Nebenstunden

- BR-JCFB B 21. Sonata in G major (Wf IX/2)
- BR-JCFB B 22. Sonata in D major (Wf IX/3)
- BR-JCFB B 23 – 24. 2 Flute Sonatas (lost)

Three Sonatas for keyboard and flute (violin) – composed around 1770/80

- BR-JCFB B 25. Sonata in F major (Wf VIII/1)
- BR-JCFB B 26. Violin Sonata in F major (incomplete)
- BR-JCFB B 27. Violin Sonata in D major (incomplete)
- BR-JCFB B 28. Sonata for Keyboard and Violin in G major (Wf IX/1) (lost)
- BR-JCFB B 29a. Sonata for keyboard and flute/violin in D major (Wf VII/4)
- BR-JCFB B 29b. Sonata for Harpsichord concertato and flute/violin and Violoncello in D major (Wf VII/4) – later version

Six Sonatas with keyboard – composed around 1780 not before 1777 – for Keyboard, Flute, Violin and Viola

- BR-JCFB B 30. Sonata No. 1 (lost)
- BR-JCFB B 31. Sonata No. 2 in G major (Wf VII/5)
- BR-JCFB B 32. Sonata No. 3 in A major (Wf VII/6)
- BR-JCFB B 33. Sonata No. 4 (lost)
- BR-JCFB B 34. Sonata No. 5 in C major (Wf VII/7)
- BR-JCFB B 35. Sonata No. 6 (lost)
- BR-JCFB B 36. Sonata in A major (Keyboard, Cello) (Wf X/4) (lost)

Six Quartet for Flute, Violin, Viola and Basso Continuo – composed around 1768/69 and not before 1766

- BR-JCFB B 37. Quartet No. 1 in D major (Wf VI/1)
- BR-JCFB B 38. Quartet No. 2 in G major (Wf VI/2)
- BR-JCFB B 39. Quartet No. 3 in C major (Wf VI/3)
- BR-JCFB B 40. Quartet No. 4 in D major (Wf VI/4)
- BR-JCFB B 41. Quartet No. 5 in F major (Wf VI/5)
- BR-JCFB B 42. Quartet No. 6 in B♭ major (Wf VI/6)

Six Quartet for 2 Violins, viola and Basso Continuo – composed in England around 1778

- BR-JCFB B 43. String Quartet No. 1 in E♭ major
- BR-JCFB B 44. String Quartet No. 2 in B♭ major
- BR-JCFB B 45. String Quartet No. 3 in A major
- BR-JCFB B 46. String Quartet No. 4 in D major
- BR-JCFB B 47. String Quartet No. 5 in G major
- BR-JCFB B 48. String Quartet No. 6 in F major
- BR-JCFB B 49. (Wind) Septet for Oboe, 2 Clarinets, 2 Bassoons and 2 Horns in E♭ major (Wf IV/1) (lost)
- BR-JCFB B 50 – 53. 4 Marches for wind band (lost)
- BR-JCFB B Inc1. Trio Sonata for 2 violins & b.c. in B♭ major (Wf XX/3)
- BR-JCFB B Inc2. Trio Sonata for 2 flutes & b.c. in C major (lost)
- BR-JCFB B Inc3. Cello Sonata in D major (Wf X/2) (lost)
- BR-JCFB B Inc4. Violin Sonata (lost)

=== Orchestral works ===
Seven Symphonies – composed before December 23, 1768

- BR-JCFB C 1. Symphony in D major (Wf I/5) (lost)
- BR-JCFB C 1b. Symphony in D major – keyboard reduction (Wf I/5)
- BR-JCFB C 2 – 3. 2 Symphonies (lost)
- BR-JCFB C 4. Symphony in D minor (Wf I/3)
- BR-JCFB C 5. Symphony in F major (Wf I/1)
- BR-JCFB C 6. Symphony in B♭ major (Wf I/2)
- BR-JCFB C 7. Symphony in E major (Wf I/4)

Three Symphonies – composed by 1770

- BR-JCFB C 8 – 9. 2 Symphonies(lost)
- BR-JCFB C 10. Symphony in C major (Wf I/6)

Three Symphonies à 6- composed until 1770

- BR-JCFB C 11. Symphony in D major (Wf I/8) (lost)
- BR-JCFB C 12. Symphony in G major (Wf I/7) (lost)
- BR-JCFB C 13. Symphony in D major (Wf I/9) (lost)
- BR-JCFB C 14. Symphony in E♭ major (Wf I/10)
- BR-JCFB C 15 – 17. 3 Symphonies (lost)

Six Symphonies à 8 or à 10 – composed by 1792

- BR-JCFB C 18. Symphony (lost)
- BR-JCFB C 19. Symphony no. 2 in D major (Wf I/11) (lost)
- BR-JCFB C 20. Symphony no. 3 in F major (Wf I/12) (lost)
- BR-JCFB C 21. Symphony no. 4 in D major (Wf I/13) (lost)
- BR-JCFB C 22. Symphony no. 5 in C major (Wf I/14) (lost)
- BR-JCFB C 23. Symphony no. 6 in G major (Wf I/15)
- BR-JCFB C 24. Symphony in E♭ major (Wf I/18) (lost)
- BR-JCFB C 25. Symphony in E♭ major (Wf I/19) (lost)
- BR-JCFB C 26. "Grand Symphony" in D major (Wf I/16) (lost)
- BR-JCFB C 27. Symphony in C major (Wf I/17) (lost)
- BR-JCFB C 28. Symphony in B♭ major (Wf I/20) – composed until August 1794
- BR-JCFB C 29. Keyboard Concerto no. 1 in E♭ major (incorrectly attributed to JCB (Warb YC 90)
- BR-JCFB C 30a. Keyboard Concerto no. 2(Orchestral version) in A major – until mid-May 1768 (Incorrectly attributed to CPE Bach and JC Bach) H383 and H490, Warb YC 91
- BR-JCFB C 30b. Keyboard Concerto no 2. (Keyboard solo) in A major – until mid-May 1768 (Incorrectly attributed to CPE Bach and JC Bach) H383, H384

Six Keyboard Concerto – Composed in England around 1778 or immediately after his return.

- BR-JCFB C 31. Keyboard Concerto "London No. 1" in G major
- BR-JCFB C 32. Keyboard Concerto "London No. 2" in F major
- BR-JCFB C 33. Keyboard Concerto "London No. 3" in D major
- BR-JCFB C 34. Keyboard Concerto "London No. 4" in E♭ major
- BR-JCFB C 35. Keyboard Concerto "London No. 5" in B♭ major
- BR-JCFB C 36. Keyboard Concerto "London No. 6" in C major
- BR-JCFB C 37. Harpsichord Concerto in E major – 1782 (Wf II/1)
- BR-JCFB C 38. Keyboard Concerto (1766) (lost)
- BR-JCFB C 39. Keyboard Concerto (1788) (lost)
- BR-JCFB C 40. Harpsichord Concerto in F major – 1782 (Wf II/4)
- BR-JCFB C 41. Harpsichord Concerto in D major – around 1780/85 (Wf II/2)
- BR-JCFB C 42. Keyboard Concerto in A major (Wf II/3) (lost)
- BR-JCFB C 43. "Concerto Grosso" in E♭ major – before September 1792 (Wf II/5) (1792)
- BR-JCFB C 44. Concerto for Keyboard and Viola in E♭ major – around 1790 (wf S. 152)
- BR-JCFB C 45. Concerto for Keyboard and Oboe in E♭ major (Wf III) (lost)
- BR-JCFB C 46. Keyboard Concerto in C major – identity of composer is uncertain – before 1749

=== Vocal works ===
Liturgical Works Oratorios

- BR-JCFB D 1. Die Pillgrimme auf Golgatha – incorrectly attributed to CPE Bach H 862
- BR-JCFB D 2a. Original version Der Tod Jesu (Wf XIV/1) – (BWV 244/3, 244/62) – Performed April 13, 1770
- BR-JCFB D 2b. Later version Der Tod Jesu (Wf XIV/1) – erformed April 8, 1784
- BR-JCFB D 3a. Original version Die Auferstehung und Himmelfahrt Jesu (Wf XIV/10) – Performed April 19, 1772
- BR-JCFB D 3b. Later version Die Auferstehung und Himmelfahrt Jesu (Wf XIV/10) – around 1785
- BR-JCFB D 4. Die Hirten bey der Krippe Jesu (Wf XIV/9) (lost)
- BR-JCFB D 5a. Early version Die Kindheit Jesu (Wf XIV/2) – performed February 11, 1773
- BR-JCFB D 5b. Revised version Die Kindheit Jesu (Wf XIV/2) – around 1784/85
- BR-JCFB D 6a. Original version Die Auferweckung Lazarus (Wf XIV/3) – performed April 23, 1773
- BR-JCFB D 6b. Later version Die Auferweckung Lazarus (Wf XIV/3) – around 1785/90
- BR-JCFB D 7. Der Fremdling auf Golgotha (Wf XIV/7) (lost)

Cantata

- BR-JCFB D 8a. Mosis Mutter und ihre Tochter (Wf XVII/3) (incomplete) – before February 1788
- BR-JCFB D 8b. Keyboard reduction Mosis Mutter und ihre Tochter (Wf XVII/3) (incomplete) – before February 1788

Mass/ Mass set/ Magnificat

- BR-JCFB E 1a. Miserere
- BR-JCFB E 1b. Miserere

Cantatas

- BR-JCFB F 1. Pfingstkantate (Wf XIV/4) (lost)
- BR-JCFB F 2. Sieh, Bückeburg, was Gott an Dir getan (lost)
- BR-JCFB F 3. Himmelfahrts-Musik (Wf XIV/8)
- BR-JCFB F 4. Michaels Sieg (Wf XIV/5)
- BR-JCFB F 5. Nun, teures Land, der Herr hat dich erhört (lost)
- BR-JCFB F 6. Singet dem Herrn ein neues Lied (Wf XIV/11) (lost)
- BR-JCFB F 7. Gott wird deinen Fuß nicht gleiten lassen (Wf XIV/12)
- BR-JCFB F Inc1. Funeral Music for Count Philipp Ernst (lost)
- BR-JCFB F Inc2. Heut ist der Tag des Dankens, ihr Völker (lost)

Arias, cantatas and incidental music

- BR-JCFB G 1. Luci amate ah non piangete (Wf XVIII/8)
- BR-JCFB G 2 – 11. 10 Italian Arias (lost)
- BR-JCFB G 12 – 26. 15 Italian Cantatas (lost)
- BR-JCFB G 27. L'Inciampo (Wf XVIII/2)
- BR-JCFB G 28 – 44. 18 Italian Cantatas (lost)
- BR-JCFB G 45. Scenes for Il pastor fido (lost)
- BR-JCFB G 46. Cassandra (Wf XVIII/1)
- BR-JCFB G 47. Die Amerikanerin (Wf XVIII/3)
- BR-JCFB G 48. Ino (Wf XVIII/4)
- BR-JCFB G 49. Prokris und Cephalus (Wf XVIII/6)
- BR-JCFB G 50. Pygmalion (Wf XVIII/5)
- BR-JCFB G 51. Ariadne auf Naxos (lost)
- BR-JCFB G 52. Brutus (Wf XVII/1) (lost)
- BR-JCFB G 53. Philoktetes (Wf XVII/2) (lost)
- BR-JCFB G Inc1. Stimmt an, greift rasch in eure Saiten (lost)
- BR-JCFB G Inc2. Va crescendo il mio tormento

Songs

- BR-JCFB H 1. Lied: Ein dunkler Feind (Wf XIX/1.1)
- BR-JCFB H 2. Lied: Die Gespenster (Wf XIX/1.2)
- BR-JCFB H 3. Lied: Die Zeit (Wf XIX:/1.3)
- BR-JCFB H 4. Lied: Der Sieg über sich selbst (Wf XIX/1.4)
- BR-JCFB H 5. Lied: Der Nachbarin Climene (Wf XIX/1.5)

=== Other works in Wohlfarth's catalogue ===
- Wf V. Sextet for piano, winds & strings in C major (see Johann Christian Bach WarB B 78)
- Wf XV/1. Ich lieg und schlafe ganz mit Frieden
- Wf XV/2. Wachet auf, ruft uns die Stimme, chorale motet on the hymn by Philipp Nicolai
- Wf XV/3. Dem Erlöser
- Wf XV/4. Unsere Auferstehung durch die Auferstehung Jesu
- Wf XVI/1. 5 Geistliche Lieder
- Wf XVI/2. 50 Geistliche Lieder
- Wf XVIII/7. O, wir bringen gerne dir
- Wf XVIIII/2. 24 Lieder
- Wf XX/1. Keyboard Concerto in C minor
- Wf XX/2. Keyboard Concerto in G major
- Wf XX/4. Fugue for keyboard in C minor
- Wf XXI/1. Arrangement of CPE Bach's "Weynachtslied"
- Wf XXI/2. Arrangement of CPE Bach's "Dancklied"
- Wf XXI/3. Arrangement of CPE Bach's "Der thätige Glaube"

Works not referenced in any catalogue

- Cello Sonata in G major
