= List of masses, passions and oratorios by Johann Sebastian Bach =

Masses, Passions, Oratorios is the subject of the second series of the Neue Bach-Ausgabe (NBA, New Bach Edition), a publication of Johann Sebastian Bach's music from 1954 to 2007. In the Bach-Werke-Verzeichnis (BWV, catalogue of Bach's compositions) masses, passions and oratorios refers to two chapters:

- Chapter 3: Messen, Messensätze, Magnificat (Masses, Mass movements, Magnificat), original range: BWV 232–243
- Chapter 4: Passionen, Oratorien (Passions, Oratorios), original range: BWV 244–249

In the BWV, as in Series II of the NBA, the group thus also includes Bach's Magnificat and separate mass movements.

Further the second series of the NBA and/or the 1998 updated edition of the BWV (BWV^{2a}) group some new additions to the BWV catalogue with the masses, passions and oratorios (e.g. Tilge, Höchster, meine Sünden, BWV 1083, Bach's adaptation of Pergolesi's Stabat Mater), and regroup some compositions that were formerly associated with other genres in the masses, passions and oratorios group (e.g. BWV 11, published as a cantata in the 19th century, added to the group as an oratorio).

Also various items in the BWV Anhang (BWV Anh., annex to the BWV), or even unmentioned in the BWV (BWV deest, lacking a BWV number) are associated with this group, for instance the motet Der Gerechte kömmt um, BC C 8, arranged, probably by Bach, from the Tristis est anima mea motet attributed to Johann Kuhnau. Such compositions or movements usually have a Bach Digital Work (BDW) page at the www.bach-digital.de website.

== Masses, mass movements and Magnificat ==
=== Mass with all usual sections ===
- BWV 232 – Mass in B minor

=== Kyrie–Gloria masses ===
- BWV 232^{I}, early version – Missa in B minor for the Dresden court (1733), re-used as part I of the Mass in B minor
- BWV 233 – Missa in F major
- BWV 234 – Missa in A major
- BWV 235 – Missa in G minor
- BWV 236 – Missa in G major

=== Cantata based on BWV 232^{I} ===
- BWV 191 – Cantata Gloria in excelsis Deo

=== Separate mass movements ===
- BWV 232^{II}, early version – Credo in G major (1748–49?)
- BWV 232^{III}, early version – Sanctus for six vocal parts (1724)
- BWV 233a – Kyrie "Christe, du Lamm Gottes" in F major (early version of Kyrie from BWV 233)
- BWV 237 – Sanctus in C major
- BWV 238 – Sanctus in D major
- BWV 239 – Sanctus in D minor (based on the first section of the Gloria of Antonio Caldara's Missa Providentiae)
- BWV 240 – Sanctus in G major (spurious, unknown composer)
- BWV 241 – Sanctus in D major (arrangement of Sanctus from Johann Caspar Kerll's Missa superba)
- BWV 242 – Christe eleison in G minor (composed by Bach for a mass by Francesco Durante, BWW Anh. 26)

=== Latin Magnificat ===
- BWV 243 – Magnificat in D major
- BWV 243a – Magnificat in E♭ major, early version of BWV 243, containing four Latin and German interpolations related to Christmas

=== German Magnificat cantatas ===
- BWV 10 – Meine Seel erhebt den Herren (German Magnificat)
- BWV 189 – Meine Seele rühmt und preist on a German paraphrase of the Magnificat text, attributed to Melchior Hoffmann.
- BWV Anh. 21 – Meine Seel erhebt den Herren, a.k.a. Kleine Magnificat (small Magnificat), Magnificat in A minor, by Melchior Hoffmann.

=== Other ===
- BWV 1081 – Credo intonation in F major for a Mass by Giovanni Battista Bassani, BDW 01267
- BWV 1082 – Bach's copy of the Suscepit Israel of Antonio Caldara's Magnificat in C major.
- BWV 1083 – Tilge, Höchster, meine Sünden, Bach's adaptation of Pergolesi's Stabat Mater.
- BWV Anh. 24 – Kyrie and Gloria in A minor from "Missa Sancti Lamberti" by Johann Christoph Pez; Bach copied its Kyrie in Weimar, adding a line different from the original continuo; Its Gloria was copied without modification in Leipzig.
- BWV Anh. 25 – Kyrie–Gloria Mass in C major (sometimes attributed to Johann Ludwig Bach, copied & performed by J. S. Bach c.1740-1742).
- BWV Anh. 26 – Mass in C minor: Scores at the International Music Score Library Project (by Francesco Durante; see above Christe eleison in G minor, BWV 242)
- BWV Anh. 27 – Sanctus in F major by Johann Ludwig Krebs.
- BWV Anh. 28 – Sanctus in B major (composer unknown).
- BWV Anh. 29 – continuo part for a Mass in C minor
- BWV Anh. 30 – Magnificat in C major for SSAATTBB choir and orchestra attributed to Antonio Lotti, and later to Pietro Torri (copied by Bach around 1742)
- BWV Anh. 166 – Missa super cantilena "Allein Gott in der Höh sei Ehr": Kyrie–Gloria Mass in E minor composed in 1716 by Johann Ludwig Bach, previously attributed to Johann Nicolaus Bach, with part scores written out by J. S. Bach and others for performance in 1729, and a small addition (5 bars) by J. S. Bach at the beginning of the Gloria. The text of the Gloria is partly in German: it intersperses the Latin text of the Gloria with, as cantus firmus, all four stanzas of "Allein Gott in der Höh sei Ehr" (which is itself a paraphrase of the Gloria), a Lutheran hymn by Nicolaus Decius and Joachim Slüter.
- BWV Anh. 167 – Kyrie–Gloria Mass in G major for double SATB choir and orchestra, possibly by Johann Ludwig Bach or Antonio Lotti. One of its 18th-century manuscript copies is partially in J. S. Bach's handwriting. Published and performed as J. S. Bach's in 1805.
- BWV Anh. 168 – Kyrie (and German Gloria) composed by Wilhelm Friedemann Bach, BDW 01479
- BWV deest – Bach's transposition from D minor to E minor and colla parte orchestration for the first two movements of Palestrina's Missa Sine nomine a 6, to be performed in Leipzig in the early 1740s as a Kyrie–Gloria Mass for SSATTB choir, and an orchestra consisting of cornets, trombones and continuo.

== Passions and oratorios ==
=== Passions composed by Bach ===
- BWV 244 – St Matthew Passion (Matthäus-Passion)
  - BWV 244b – St Matthew Passion, early version(s)
- BWV 245 – St John Passion (Johannes-Passion), various versions, including:
  - St. John Passion, 2nd version, with opening chorus "O Mensch, bewein dein Sünde groß" (1725), BDW 00308, containing:
    - BWV 245a – Aria "Himmel reiße, Welt erbebe"
    - BWV 245b – Aria "Zerschmettert mich, ihr Felsen und ihr Hügel"
    - BWV 245c – Aria "Ach, windet euch nicht so, geplagte Seelen"
  - St. John Passion, Bach's last revision (1749), BDW 00310
- BWV 247 – St Mark Passion (Markus-Passion) (libretto is extant; although the music is lost much of it is reconstructable based on associated compositions)
- BWV deest – Weimarer Passion (lost, music partially recuperated in other compositions), BDW 01533

=== Passions by other composers with movements by Bach ===
- BWV 246 – St Luke Passion (Lukas-Passion) by an unknown composer and librettist, includes one movement by Bach:
  - BWV 246/40a – Chorale "Aus der Tiefen rufe ich", BDW 00312
- BWV deest – St Mark Passion (attributed to Keiser), surviving in various (pasticcio) versions, with three movements associated with Bach:
  - BWV 500a – Chorale "So gehst du nun, mein Jesu, hin", BDW 00571
  - BWV 1084 – Chorale "O hilf Christe, Gottes Sohn", BDW 01270, and earlier version BDW 01677
  - BWV deest – Chorale "O Traurigkeit, o Herzeleid", BDW 01679, and earlier version BDW 01678
- BWV deest – Passion oratorio Wer ist der, so von Edom kömmt (pasticcio), with three movements associated with Bach:
  - BWV 127/1 (variant) – Chorus "Herr Jesu Christ, wahr' Mensch und Gott", BDW 00155
  - BWV 1088 – Arioso "So heb ich denn mein Auge sehnlich auf", BDW 01274
  - BWV deest – Chorus "Der Gerechte kömmt um", also as separate motet (BC C 8), BDW 01532

=== Other vocal compositions associated with Passion music ===
- BWV 244a – Trauermusik Klagt, Kinder, klagt es aller Welt (funeral cantata), music lost but largely reconstructable based on BWV 244b and 198
- BWV 200 – Aria "Bekennen will ich seinen Namen", arranged by Bach from a Passion oratorio by Gottfried Heinrich Stölzel, BDW 00250

=== Spurious ===
- BWV Anh. 169 – Passion text Erbauliche Gedanken auf den Grünen Donnerstag und Charfreitag über den Leidenden Jesum by Picander, not set by Bach (apart from some movements of the St Matthew Passion)

=== Oratorios and associated cantatas ===
- BWV 248 – Christmas Oratorio (Weihnachts-Oratorium), consisting of six cantatas composed for the Christmas season of 1734–1735:
  - BWV 248^{I} – Cantata Jauchzet, frohlocket! Auf, preiset die Tage
  - BWV 248^{II} – Cantata Und es waren Hirten in derselben Gegend
  - BWV 248^{III} – Cantata Herrscher des Himmels, erhöre das Lallen
  - BWV 248^{IV} – Cantata Fallt mit Danken, fallt mit Loben
  - BWV 248^{V} – Cantata Ehre sei dir, Gott, gesungen
  - BWV 248^{VI} – Cantata Herr, wenn die stolzen Feinde schnauben
- BWV 248^{VI}a – textless cantata, model for BWV 248^{VI}.
- BWV 249 – Easter Oratorio (Oster-Oratorium), also known by its incipit Kommt, eilet und laufet
  - BWV 249a – Secular cantata Entfliehet, verschwindet, entweichet, ihr Sorgen
  - BWV 249b – Secular cantata Verjaget, zerstreuet, zerrüttet, ihr Sterne
- BWV 11 – Ascension Oratorio (Himmelfahrts-Oratorium), previously known as Cantata Lobet Gott in seinen Reichen

== Compositions in the third and fourth chapters of the Bach-Werke-Verzeichnis (1998) ==
Legend to the table
column		content
1	BWV	Bach-Werke-Verzeichnis (lit. 'Bach-works-catalogue'; BWV) numbers. Anhang (Annex; Anh.) numbers are indicated as follows: preceded by I: in Anh. I (lost works) of BWV^{1} (1950 first edition of the BWV); preceded by II: in Anh. II (doubtful works) of BWV^{1}; preceded by III: in Anh. III (spurious works) of BWV^{1}; preceded by N: new Anh. numbers in BWV^{2} (1990) and/or BWV^{2a} (1998)
2	^{2a}	Section in which the composition appears in BWV^{2a}: Chapters of the main catalogue indicated by Arabic numerals (1-13); Anh. sections indicated by Roman numerals (I–III); Reconstructions published in the NBE indicated by "R"
3	Date	Date associated with the completion of the listed version of the composition. Exact dates (e.g. for most cantatas) usually indicate the assumed date of first (public) performance. When the date is followed by an abbreviation in brackets (e.g. JSB for Johann Sebastian Bach) it indicates the date of that person's involvement with the composition as composer, scribe or publisher.
4	Name	Name of the composition: if the composition is known by a German incipit, that German name is preceded by the composition type (e.g. cantata, chorale prelude, motet, ...)
5	Key	Key of the composition
6	Scoring	See scoring table below for the abbreviations used in this column
7	BG	Bach Gesellschaft-Ausgabe (BG edition; BGA): numbers before the colon indicate the volume in that edition. After the colon an Arabic numeral indicates the page number where the score of the composition begins, while a Roman numeral indicates a description of the composition in the Vorwort (Preface) of the volume.
8	NBE	New Bach Edition (German: Neue Bach-Ausgabe, NBA): Roman numerals for the series, followed by a slash, and the volume number in Arabic numerals. A page number, after a colon, refers to the "Score" part of the volume. Without such page number, the composition is only described in the "Critical Commentary" part of the volume. The volumes group Bach's compositions by genre: 1. Cantatas (Vol. 1–34: church cantatas grouped by occasion; Vol. 35–40: secular cantatas; Vol. 41: Varia); 2. Masses, Passions, Oratorios (12 volumes); 3. Motets, Chorales, Lieder (4 volumes); 4. Organ Works (11 volumes); 5. Keyboard and Lute Works (14 volumes); 6. Chamber Music (5 volumes); 7. Orchestral Works (7 volumes); 8. Canons, Musical Offering, Art of Fugue (3 volumes); 9. Addenda (approximately 7 volumes)
9	Additional info	may include: "after" – indicating a model for the composition; "by" – indicating the composer of the composition (if different from Johann Sebastian Bach); "in" – indicating the oldest known source for the composition; "pasticcio" – indicating a composition with parts of different origin; "see" – composition renumbered in a later edition of the BWV; "text" – by text author, or, in source; Provenance of standard texts and tunes, such as Lutheran hymns and their chorale melodies, Latin liturgical texts (e.g. Magnificat) and common tunes (e.g. Folia), are not usually indicated in this column. For an overview of such resources used by Bach, see individual composition articles, and overviews in, e.g., Chorale cantata (Bach)#Bach's chorale cantatas, List of chorale harmonisations by Johann Sebastian Bach#Chorale harmonisations in various collections and List of organ compositions by Johann Sebastian Bach#Chorale Preludes.
10	BD	Bach Digital Work page

Legend for abbreviations in "Scoring" column
Voices (see also SATB)
a	A	b	B	s	S	t	T	v			V	
alto (solo part)	alto (choir part)	bass (solo part)	bass (choir part)	soprano (solo part)	soprano (choir part)	tenor (solo part)	tenor (choir part)	voice (includes parts for unspecified voices or instruments as in some canons)			vocal music for unspecified voice type	
Winds and battery (bold = soloist)
Bas	Bel	Cnt	Fl	Hn	Ob	Oba	Odc	Tai	Tbn	Tdt	Tmp	Tr
bassoon (can be part of Bc, see below)	bell(s) (musical bells)	cornett, cornettino	flute (traverso, flauto dolce, piccolo, flauto basso)	natural horn, corno da caccia, corno da tirarsi, lituo	oboe	oboe d'amore	oboe da caccia	taille	trombone	tromba da tirarsi	timpani	tromba (natural trumpet, clarino trumpet)
Strings and keyboard (bold = soloist)
Bc		Hc	Kb	Lu	Lw	Org	Str	Va	Vc	Vdg	Vl	Vne
basso continuo: Vdg, Hc, Vc, Bas, Org, Vne and/or Lu		harpsichord	keyboard (Hc, Lw, Org or clavichord)	lute, theorbo	Lautenwerck (lute-harpsichord)	organ (/man. = manualiter, without pedals)	strings: Vl I, Vl II and Va	viola(s), viola d'amore, violetta	violoncello, violoncello piccolo	viola da gamba	violin(s), violino piccolo	violone, violone grosso

Background colours
Colour	Meaning
green	extant or clearly documented partial or complete manuscript (copy) by Bach and/or first edition under Bach's supervision
yellow	extant or clearly documented manuscript (copy) or print edition, in whole or in part, by close relative, i.e. brother (J. Christoph), wife (A. M.), son (W. F. / C. P. E. / J. C. F. / J. Christian) or son-in-law (Altnickol)
orange-brown	extant or clearly documented manuscript (copy) by close friend and/or pupil (Kellner, Krebs, Kirnberger, Walther, ...), or distant family member

Compositions in Chapters 3 and 4 of BWV^{2a}
BWV	^{2a}	Date	Name	Key	Scoring	BG	NBE	Additional info	BD
**3.**	Masses, Mass movements, Magnificat (see also: List of Masses, Mass movements and Magnificats by Johann Sebastian Bach)								Up ↑
232	3.	Aug. 1748 – Oct. 1749 (compilation, completion)	Mass a.k.a. Hohe Messe, Mass in B minor	B min.	ssatbSSAATB 3Tr Tmp Hn 2Fl 3Ob 2Oba 2Bas Vl Str Bc	6	II/1 rev 1	after BWV 232^{I} e. v., ^{II} e. v., ^{III} e. v., 171/1, 12/2, 120/2, Anh. 11/1, Anh. 196/3; text after Ordinarium Missae	00289
232^{I} e. v.	3.	1733-07-27	Kyrie–Gloria Mass for the Dresden court (Mass in B Minor, Part I: Missa; early version)	B min.	ssatbSSATB 3Tr Tmp Hn 2Fl 2Oba 2Bas Vl Str Bc		II/1a	after BWV 29/1, 46/1; text from Ordinarium Missae; → BWV 191, 232^{I}	00290
233	3.	1738–1739?	Kyrie–Gloria Mass	F maj.	sabSATB 2Hn 2Ob Bas Str Bc	8: 1	II/2: 197	after BWV 233a, 102/3, /5, 40/1; text from Ordinarium Missae	00291
233a	3.	1708-04-06?	Kyrie "Christe, du Lamm Gottes"	F maj.	SSATB Bc	41: 187	II/2: 285	text after Ordinarium Missae; → BWV 233/1	00292
234	3.	c.1738	Kyrie–Gloria Mass	A maj.	sabSATB 2Fl Str Bc	8: 51	II/2: 1	after BWV 67/6, 138/5, 179/5, 79/2; text from Ordinarium Missae	00293
235	3.	1738–1739?	Kyrie–Gloria Mass	G min.	atbSATB 2Ob Str Bc	8: 99	II/2: 127	after BWV 102/1, 72/1, 187/4, /3, /5, /1; text from Ordinarium Missae	00294
236	3.	1738–1739?	Kyrie–Gloria Mass	G maj.	satbSATB 2Ob Str Bc	8: 155	II/2: 61	after BWV 179/1, /3, 79/1, /5, 138/5, 17/1; text from Ordinarium Missae	00295
1081	3.	c.1747 – Aug. 1748	Credo intonation for Mass No. 5 in F major of G. B. Bassani's Acroama Missale	F maj.	SATB Bc		II/2	→ BNB I/B/48; text from Credo	01267
237	3.	1723-06-24?	Sanctus	C maj.	SATB 3Tr Tmp 2Ob Str Bc	11^{1}: 67	II/2: 311	text from Sanctus	00296
238	3.	1723-12-25; 1736–1737	Sanctus	D maj.	SATB Cnt Str Bc	11^{1}: 79	II/2: 325	text from Sanctus	00297
240	3.	1742 (JSB)	Sanctus	G maj.	SATB 2Ob Str Bc	11^{1}: 93	II/9: 3	text from Sanctus	00299
241	3.	Jul. 1747 – Aug. 1748 (JSB)	Sanctus of Missa superba	D maj.	2SATB 2Oba 2Vl 3Va Bas Vc Vne Bc	41: 177	II/9: 45	after Kerll; text from Sanctus	00300
242	3.	1727–1732 (JSB)	Christe eleison for a Kyrie-Gloria Mass in C minor by F. Durante	G min.	SA Bc	41: 197	II/2: 295	text from Kyrie; → BWV Anh. 26/2	00301
243.2	3.	1733-07-02? 1732–1735	Magnificat (2nd version: Visitation?)	D maj.	ssatbSSATB 3Tr Tmp 2Fl 2Ob 2Oba Str Bas Vc Vne Bc	11^{1}: 1	II/3: 65	after BWV 243.1 (same text)	00302
243.1	3.	1723-07-02; 1723-12-25	Magnificat (1st version:Visitation, and with 4 laudes added: Christmas)	E♭ maj.	ssatbSSATB 3Tr Tmp 2Fl 2Ob Str Bc	11^{1}: 103	II/3: 1	after Magnificat peregrini toni (/10); text: Magnificat; → BWV 243.2	00303
1082	3.	1740–1742 (JSB)	Suscepit Israel from a Magnificat by A. Caldara	E min.	SATB 2Vl Bc		II/9: 59	after Caldara (BNB I/C/1); text from Magnificat	01268
1083	3.	1745–1747 (JSB)	Cantata Tilge, Höchster, meine Sünden		sa 2Vl Str Vne Vc Bc		I/41: 169	after Pergolesi (Stabat Mater); text after Ps. 51	01269
**4.**	Passions, Oratorios (see also: List of Passions and Oratorios by Johann Sebastian Bach)								Up ↑
244.2	4.	1736-03-30; 1742; 1743–1746	Passion St Matthew Passion (later versions; Good Friday)	E min.	2satb2SATB 2Fl 4Fl 4Ob 4Oba 2Odc 2Str 2Vdg 2Bc	4; 44: 58	II/5	after BWV 244.1, 245.2 (/29); text by Picander, Decius (/1), Heermann (/3, /19, /46), Gerhardt (/10, /15, /17, /37, /44, /54, /62), Albert of Prussia (/25), Heyden (/29), Reusner (/32), Rist (/40), after Mt 26–27, Sng 6:1 (/30)	00304
244a								see BWV 1143	00305
244.1	4.	1727-04-11	Passion St Matthew Passion (early version; Good Friday)	E min.	satb2SATB 4Fl 4Ob 4Oba 2Odc 2Str Lu Bc		II/5a; II/5b	after Z 4361a (/1), 983 (/3, /19, /46), 2293b (/10, /37), 5385a (/15, /17, /44, /54, /62), 7568 (/25), 3449 (/29), 2461c (/32), 6551 (/40); text by Picander, Heermann (/3, /19, /46), Gerhardt (/10, /15, /17, /37, /44, /54, /62), Albert of Prussia (/25), Keymann (/29), Reusner (/32), Rist (/40), after Mt 26–27, Sng 6:1 (/30); ↔ BWV 198, 1143; → BWV 244.2	00306
244/3	4.	1727-04-11	chorale setting "Herzliebster Jesu" (s. 1)	B min.	SATB	4: 23	III/2.2: 43	after Z 983; text by Heermann	11349
244/10	4.	1727-04-11	chorale setting "O Welt, sieh hier dein Leben" (s. 5)	A♭ maj.	SATB	4: 42	III/2.2: 66	after Z 2293b; text by Gerhardt	11351
244/10	4.	1727-04-11	chorale setting "Nun ruhen alle Wälder"	A♭ maj.	SATB	4: 42	III/2.2: 66	after Z 2293b; text by Gerhardt	11351
244/15	4.	1727-04-11	chorale setting "O Haupt voll Blut und Wunden" (s. 5)	E maj. D maj.	SATB	4: 51	III/2.2: 55	after Z 5385a; text by Gerhardt	11358
244/17	4.	1727-04-11	chorale setting "O Haupt voll Blut und Wunden" (s. 6; in BWV 244.1: s. 7?)	E♭ maj. D maj.	SATB	4: 53	III/2.2: 55	after Z 5385a; text by Gerhardt	11358
244/25	4.	1727-04-11	chorale setting "Was mein Gott will, das gscheh allzeit" (s. 1)	B min.	SATB	4: 83	III/2.2: 64	after Z 7568; text by Albert of Prussia	11353
244/32	4.	1727-04-11	chorale setting "In dich hab ich gehoffet, Herr" (s. 5)	B♭ maj.	SATB	4: 151	III/2.2: 66	after Z 2461c; text by Reusner	11354
244/37	4.	1727-04-11	chorale setting "O Welt, sieh hier dein Leben" (s. 3)	F maj.	SATB	4: 164	III/2.2: 29	after Z 2293b; text by Gerhardt	11352
244/37	4.	1727-04-11	chorale setting "In allen meinen Taten"	F maj.	SATB	4: 164	III/2.2: 29	after Z 2293b; text by Fleming	11352
244/40	4.	1727-04-11	chorale setting "Werde munter, mein Gemüte" (s. 6)	A maj.	SATB	4: 173	III/2.1: 95; III/2.2: 68	after Z 6551; text by Rist	11254
244/40	4.	1727-04-11	chorale setting "Jesu, meiner Seelen Wonne"	A maj.	SATB	4: 173	III/2.1: 95; III/2.2: 68	after Z 6551; text by Janus	11254
244/44	4.	1727-04-11	chorale setting "Befiehl du deine Wege" (s. 1)	D maj.	SATB	4: 186	III/2.2: 49	after Z 5385a; text by Gerhardt	11355
244/44	4.	1727-04-11	chorale setting "O Haupt voll Blut und Wunden"	D maj.	SATB	4: 186	III/2.2: 49	after Z 5385a; text by Gerhardt	11355
244/46	4.	1727-04-11	chorale setting "Herzliebster Jesu" (s. 4)	B min.	SATB	4: 192	III/2.2: 59	after Z 983; text by Heermann	11350
244/54	4.	1727-04-11	chorale setting "O Haupt voll Blut und Wunden" (ss. 1–2)	F maj.	SATB	4: 214	III/2.2: 41	after Z 5385a; text by Gerhardt	11356
244/62	4.	1727-04-11	chorale setting "O Haupt voll Blut und Wunden" (s. 9)	A min. B min.	SATB	4: 248	III/2.2: 50	after Z 5385a; text by Gerhardt	11357
245.1	4.	1724-04-07	Passion St John Passion (1st version; Good Friday)	G min.	satbSATB (2Fl?) 2Ob 2Odc Str 2Va Vdg Lu Bc	12^{1} 44: 26	II/4: 40	after Z 983 (/3, /17), 2561 (/5), 2293b (/11), 6288a–b (/14, /28, /32), 6283b (/15, /37), 2383 (/22), 5404a (/26), 8326 (/40); text after Jh 18–19, Mt 26:75 (/12), Mk 15:38 (/33), by Heermann (/3, /17), Luther (/5), Brockes (/7, /19, /20, /24, /32, /34, /35, /39), Gerhardt (/11), Weise (/13), Stockmann (/14, /28, /32), Weiße (/15, /37), Postel (/19, /22, /30), Herberger (/26), Schalling (/40); → BWV 245.2–5	00307
245.1/3	4.	1724-04-07	chorale setting "Herzliebster Jesu" (s. 7)	G min.	SATB		III/2.1: 93	after Z 983; text by Heermann	11255
245/3	4.	c. 1740	chorale setting "Herzliebster Jesu" (s. 7)	G min.	SATB	12^{1}: 17	III/2.2: 33	after Z 983; text by Heermann	11255
245.1/5	4.	1724-04-07	chorale setting "Vater unser im Himmelreich" (s. 4)	D min.	SATB		III/2.1: 94; III/2.2: 27	after Z 2561; text by Luther after Mt 6:9–13; ↔ BWV 416	11256
245/5	4.	c. 1740	chorale setting "Vater unser im Himmelreich" (s. 4)	D min.	SATB	12^{1}: 18		after Z 2561; text by Luther after Mt 6:9–13	11256
245/11	4.	1724-04-07	chorale setting "O Welt, sieh hier dein Leben" (ss. 3–4)	A maj.	SATB	12^{1}: 31	III/2.1: 94; III/2.2: 35	after Z 2293b; text by Gerhardt; → BWV 395	11257
245/11	4.	1724-04-07	chorale setting "Nun ruhen alle Wälder"	A maj.	SATB	12^{1}: 31	III/2.1: 94; III/2.2: 35	after Z 2293b; text by Gerhardt; → BWV 395	11257
245/14	4.	1724-04-07	chorale setting "Jesu Leiden, Pein und Tod" (s. 10)	A maj.	SATB	12^{1}: 39	III/2.2: 46	after Z 6288a–b; text by Stockmann	11273
245/15	4.	1724-04-07	chorale setting "Christus, der uns selig macht" (s. 1)	A min.	SATB	12^{1}: 43	III/2.2: 44	after Z 6283b; text by Weiße after "Patris sapientia"	11274
245/17	4.	1724-04-07	chorale setting "Herzliebster Jesu" (ss. 8–9)	A min.	SATB	12^{1}: 52	III/2.1: 95; III/2.2: 62	after Z 983; text by Heermann	11258
245/22	4.	1724-04-07	chorale setting "Durch dein Gefängnis Gottes Sohn"	E maj.	SATB	12^{1}: 74	III/2.2: 181	after Z 2383; text by Postel	11275
245/22	4.	1724-04-07	chorale setting "Machs mit mir, Gott, nach deiner Güt"	E maj.	SATB	12^{1}: 74	III/2.2: 181	after Z 2383; text by Schein	11275
245/26	4.	1724-04-07	chorale setting "Valet will ich dir geben" (s. 3)	E♭ maj.	SATB	12^{1}: 95	III/2.1: 96; III/2.2: 60	after Z 5404a; text by Herberger	11259
245/28	4.	1724-04-07	chorale setting "Jesu Leiden, Pein und Tod" (s. 20)	A maj.	SATB	12^{1}: 103	III/2.2: 59	after Z 6288a–b; text by Stockmann	11276
245/37	4.	1724-04-07	chorale setting "Christus, der uns selig macht" (s. 8)	B♭ min.	SATB	12^{1}: 121	III/2.2: 63	after Z 6283b; text by Weiße after "Patris sapientia"	11277
245/40	4.	1724-04-07	chorale setting "Herzlich lieb hab ich dich, o Herr" (s. 3)	E♭ maj.	SATB	12^{1}: 131	III/2.2: 60	after Z 8326; text by Schalling	11278
245.2	4.	1725-03-30	Passion St John Passion (2nd version; Good Friday)	E♭ maj.	satbSATB 2Fl 2Ob 2Odc Str Vdg Bc	12^{1}	II/4: 167	after Z 8303 (/1), BWV 245.1, 23/4 (/40); text by Heyden (/1), Heermann (/3, /17), Luther (/5, /40), Brockes (/7, /24, /32, /34, /35, /39), Gerhardt (/11), Birkmann (a, b, c) Stockmann (a, /14, /28, /32), Weiße (/15, /37), Postel (/22, /30), Herberger (/26), after Jh 18–19, Mt 26:75 (/12), Mt 27:51 (/33); → BWV 245.3; /1 → BWV 244.2/29,	00308
245.3	4.	1730-04-07	Passion St John Passion (3rd version; Good Friday)		satbSATB 2Fl 2Ob Str Vdg Org Bc	12^{1} 44: 26	II/4: 206	after BWV 245.1–.2; text after Jh 18–19, by Heermann (/3, /17), Luther (/5), Brockes (/7, /19, /20, /24, /32, /39), Gerhardt (/11), Stockmann (/14, /28, /32), Weiße (/15, /37), Postel (/19, /22, /30), Herberger (/26); → BWV 245.4–5	00309
245.4	4.	1739	Passion St John Passion (incomplete revision)		satbSATB Fl 2Ob Str Bc	12^{1} 44: 26	II/4	after BWV 245.1–.3; text by Heyden (/1), Heermann (/3), Luther (/5), after Jh 18; → BWV 245.5	11076
245.5	4.	1749-04-04	Passion St John Passion (4th version; Good Friday)		satbSATB 2Fl 2Ob 2Oba Odc Bas Str Vdg Hc Bc	12^{1} 44: 26	II/4	after BWV 245.1–4; text after Jh 18–19, Mt 26:75 (/12), Mt 27:51 (/33), by Heermann (/3, /17), Luther (/5), Brockes (/7, /19, /24, /32, /34, /35, /39), Gerhardt (/11), Weise (/13), Stockmann (/14, /28, /32), Weiße (/15, /37), Postel (/19, /22, /30), Herberger (/26), Schalling (/40)	00310
246/40a	4.	1743–1745 (JSB)	Chorale Aus der Tiefen rufe ich, No. 40 of St Luke Passion		t Str Bc (?)		II/9: 65	after BWV 246/40	00312
247	4.	1731-03-23; 1744-04-03	Passion St Mark Passion (Good Friday; music lost but in part reconstructable)		satbSATB 2Fl 2Ob 2Oba 2Vl 2Va (2Vdg 2Lu) Org Bc (?)		II/5	text by Picander, Jonas, Reusner, Gerhardt, Rist, Kritzelmann, Schein, Stockmann, Franck, J., Homburg, Luther, Spee; after BWV 198/1, /5, /3, /8, /10 (or 244a/7), 54/1, 248/28?, /45, 7/2?	00313
1088	4.	c.1750?	Arioso So heb ich denn mein Auge sehnlich auf, No. 20 in Passion Oratorio Wer ist der, so von Edom kömmt (Good Friday)		b 2Bas Bc (?)		I/41: 125		01274
248	4.	1734-12-25 – 1735-01-06	Oratorio Christmas Oratorio (Christmastide)	D maj.	satbSATB 3Tr 2Hn Tmp 2Fl 2Ob 2Oba 2Odc Str Bc	5^{1} 44: 125	II/6	after BWV 214 (/1, /8, /15, /24), 213 (/4, /19, /29, /36, /39, /41), 215 (/47), 248^{VI}a (/54, /56–/57, /61–/64), Z 5385a (/5, /64), 1947 (/7, /28), 346 (/9, /17, /23), 5741b (/12), 6462 (/33), 2072 (/35), 2461c (/46), 3614b (/53), 4429a (/59); text by Picander?, Gerhardt (/5, /17, /23, /33, /59), Luther (/7, /9, /28), Rist (/12, /38, /40, /42), Runge (/35), Weissel (/46), Franck, J. (/53), Werner (/64), after Lk 2:1–21, Mt 2:1–12	00314
248^{I}	4.	1734-12-25	Cantata Jauchzet, frohlocket, auf, preiset die Tage (Christmas Oratorio, Part I; Christmas)	D maj.	satbSATB 3Tr Tmp 2Fl 2Ob 2Oba Str Bc	5^{1}: 2; 44: 125	II/6: 1	after BWV 214/1 & /7 (/1 & /8), 213/9 (/4), Z 5385a (/5), 1947 (/7), 346 (/9); text by Picander?, Gerhardt (/5), Luther (/7, /9), after Lk 2:1, 3–7	11385
248/5	4.	1734-12-25	chorale setting "Wie soll ich dich empfangen" (s. 1)	A min.	SATB	5^{1}: 36	III/2.2: 199	after Z 5385a; text by Gerhardt	11279
248/5	4.	1734-12-25	chorale setting "O Haupt voll Blut und Wunden"	A min.	SATB	5^{1}: 36	III/2.2: 199	after Z 5385a; text by Gerhardt	11279
248/9	4.	1734-12-25	chorale setting "Vom Himmel hoch da komm ich her" (s. 13)	D maj.	SATB	5^{1}: 47	III/2.2: 26	after Z 346; text by Luther	11280
248^{II}	4.	1734-12-26	Cantata Und es waren Hirten in derselben Gegend (Christmas Oratorio, Part II; Christmas 2)	G maj.	satbSATB 2Fl 2Oba 2Odc Str Bc	5^{1}: 50; 44: 126	II/6: 55	after Z 5741b (/3), 346 (/8, /14), BWV 214/5 (/6), 213/3 (/10); text by Picander?, Rist (/3), Gerhardt (/8, /14), after Lk 2: 8–14	11386
248/12	4.	1734-12-26	chorale setting "Ermuntre dich, mein schwacher Geist" (s. 9)	G maj.	SATB	5^{1}: 59	III/2.1: 83, 92; III/2.2: 7, 207	after Z 5741b; text by Rist	11260
248/12	4.	1734-12-26	chorale setting "Du Lebensfürst, Herr Jesu Christ"	G maj.	SATB	5^{1}: 59	III/2.1: 83, 92; III/2.2: 7, 207	after Z 5741b; text by Rist	11260
248/17	4.	1734-12-26	chorale setting "Schaut, schaut, was ist für Wunder dar" (s. 8)	C maj.	SATB	5^{1}: 66	III/2.1: 84	after Z 346; text by Gerhardt	11261
248/17	4.	1734-12-26	chorale setting "Vom Himmel hoch da komm ich her"	C maj.	SATB	5^{1}: 66	III/2.1: 84	after Z 346; text by Luther	11261
248/23	4.	1734-12-26	chorale setting "Wir singen dir, Immanuel" (s. 2)	G maj.	SATB	5^{1}: 90	III/2.2: 198	after Z 346; text by Gerhardt	11281
248/23	4.	1734-12-26	chorale setting "Vom Himmel hoch da komm ich her"	G maj.	SATB	5^{1}: 90	III/2.2: 198	after Z 346; text by Luther	11281
248^{III}	4.	1734-12-27	Cantata Herrscher des Himmels, erhöre das Lallen (Christmas Oratorio, Part III; Christmas 3)	D maj.	satbSATB 3Tr Tmp 2Fl 2Ob 2Oba Str Bc	5^{1}: 94	II/6: 107	after BWV 214/9 (/1=/13), 213/11 (/6), Z 1947 (/5), 6462 (/10), 2072 (/12); text by Picander?, Luther (/5), Gerhardt (/10), Runge (/12), after Lk 2: 15–20	11387
248/28	4.	1734-12-27	chorale setting "Gelobet seist du, Jesu Christ" (s. 7)	D maj.	SATB	5^{1}: 110	III/2.1: 85	after Z 1947; text by Luther	11262
248/33	4.	1734-12-27	chorale setting "Fröhlich soll mein Herze springen" (s. 15)	G maj.	SATB	5^{1}: 124	III/2.1: 86; III/2.2: 81	after Z 6462; text by Gerhardt	11264
248/33	4.	1734-12-27	chorale setting "Warum sollt ich mich denn grämen"	G maj.	SATB	5^{1}: 124	III/2.1: 86; III/2.2: 81	after Z 6462; text by Gerhardt	11264
248/35	4.	1734-12-27	chorale setting "Laßt Furcht und Pein" (s. 4)	F♯ min.	SATB	5^{1}: 126	III/2.1: 86; III/2.2: 206	after Z 2072; text by Runge	11263
248/35	4.	1734-12-27	chorale setting "Wir Christenleut"	F♯ min.	SATB	5^{1}: 126	III/2.1: 86; III/2.2: 206	after Z 2072; text by Füger	11263
248^{IV}	4.	1735-01-01	Cantata Fallt mit Danken, fallt mit Loben (Christmas Oratorio, Part IV; New Year)	F maj.	satbSATB 2Hn 2Ob Str Bc	5^{1}: 128	II/6: 143	after BWV 213/1, /5, /7 (/1, /4, /6); text by Picander?, Rist (/3, /5, /7), after Lk 2: 21	11388
248/42	4.	1735-01-01	chorale setting "Hilf, Herr Jesu, laß gelingen" (s. 15)	F maj.	SATB	5^{1}: 166	III/2.1: 99; III/2.2: 211	text by Rist	11266
248/42	4.	1735-01-01	chorale setting "Jesu, meiner Seelen Wonne"	F maj.	SATB	5^{1}: 166	III/2.1: 99; III/2.2: 211	text by Janus	11266
248^{V}	4.	1735-01-02	Cantata Ehre sei dir, Gott, gesungen (Christmas Oratorio, Part V; New Year I)	A maj.	satbSATB 2Oba Str Bc	5^{1}: 172	II/6: 199	after BWV 247/39b (/3), 215/7 (/5), Z 2461c (/4), 3614b (/11); text by Picander?, Weissel (/4), Franck, J. (/11), after Mt 2:1–6	11389
248/46	4.	1735-01-02	chorale setting "Nun, liebe Seel, nun ist es Zeit" (s. 5)	A maj.	SATB	5^{1}: 190	III/2.1: 87; III/2.2: 43	after Z 2461c; text by Weissel	11265
248/46	4.	1735-01-02	chorale setting "In dich hab ich gehoffet, Herr"	A maj.	SATB	5^{1}: 190	III/2.1: 87; III/2.2: 43	after Z 2461c; text by Reusner	11265
248/53	4.	1735-01-02	chorale setting "Ihr Gestirn, ihr hohlen Lüfte" (s. 9)	A maj.	SATB	5^{1}: 208	III/2.1: 100; III/2.2: 21	after Z 3614b; text by Franck, J.	11267
248/53	4.	1735-01-02	chorale setting "Gott des Himmels und der Erden"	A maj.	SATB	5^{1}: 208	III/2.1: 100; III/2.2: 21	after Z 3614b; text by Albert	11267
248^{VI}	4.	1735-01-06	Cantata Herr, wenn die stolzen Feinde schnauben (Christmas Oratorio, Part VI; Epiphany)	D maj.	satbSATB 3Tr Tmp 2Ob 2Oba Str Bc	5^{1}: 210	II/6: 243	after BWV 248^{VI}a (/1, /3, /4, /8–/11), Z 4429a (/6), 5385a (/11); text by Picander?, Gerhardt (/6), Werner (/11), after Mt 2:7–12	11390
248/59	4.	1735-01-06	chorale setting "Ich steh an deiner Krippen hier" (s. 1)	G maj.	SATB	5^{1}: 245	III/2.1: 84; III/2.2: 208	after 4429a; text by Gerhardt	11268
248/59	4.	1735-01-06	chorale setting "Es ist gewisslich an der Zeit"	G maj.	SATB	5^{1}: 245	III/2.1: 84; III/2.2: 208	after 4429a; text by Ringwaldt	11268
248/64	4.	1735-01-06	chorale setting "Ihr Christen auserkoren" (s. 4)	D maj.	SATB	5^{1}: 256	III/2.1: 85	after 5385a; text by Werner	11269
248/64	4.	1735-01-06	chorale setting "Ach Herr, mich armen Sünder"	D maj.	SATB	5^{1}: 256	III/2.1: 85	after 5385a; text by Schneegaß	11269
248^{VI}a	4.	1734 or earlier	Cantata model for BWV 248^{VI}	D maj.	satbSATB 3Tr Tmp 2Ob 2Oba Str Bc		II/6	after BWV Anh. 10/1; → 248/54, /56–/57, /61–/64	00315
249.5	4.	1743–1746; 1749-04-06; 1750-03-26	Oratorio Kommt, eilet und laufet (Easter Oratorio; Easter)		satbSATB 3Tr Tmp Fl 2Fl 2Ob Oba Str Bc	21^{3}	II/7: 1	after BWV 249.4; text by Picander?	00316
249.4	4.	c. 1738	Oratorio Kommt, eilet und laufet (Easter Oratorio, middle version; Easter)		satbSATB 3Tr Tmp Fl 2Fl 2Ob Oba Str Bc		II/7	after BWV 249.3; text by Picander?; → BWV 249.5	11392
249.3	4.	1725-04-01 c.1738	Cantata Kommt, fliehet und eilet (Easter Oratorio, early versions: first version as cantata; Easter)		satbSATB 3Tr Tmp Fl 2Fl 2Ob Oba Vl Str Bc		II/7: 97	after BWV 249.1; text by Picander?; → BWV 249.4	00317
249.1	4.	1725-02-23	Secular cantata Entfliehet, verschwindet, entweichet, ihr Sorgen, a.k.a. Shepherd Cantata (birthday of Christian of Saxe-Weissenfels; music lost but in part reconstructable)		satbSATB 3Tr Tmp Fl 2Fl 2Ob Str Bc		I/35	text by Picander; → BWV 249.3/1–/3, /5, /7, /9, /11; 249.2	00318
249.2	4.	1726-08-25	Secular cantata Verjaget, zerstreuet, zerrüttet, ihr Sterne a.k.a. Die Feier des Genius (dramma per musica; birthday of Joachim Friedrich von Flemming; music lost but in part reconstructable)				I/39	after BWV 249.1/1–/3, /5, /7, /9, /11; text by Picander	00319
11	4.	1738-05-15	Oratorio Lobet Gott in seinen Reichen (Ascension Oratorio; Ascension)	D maj.	satbSATB 3Tr Tmp 2Fl 2Ob Str Bc	2: 1	II/8: 1	after Z 5741b (/6), 5264b (/9); text by Picander?, Rist (/6), Sacer (/9), after Lk 24:50ff., Acts 1:9–12, Mk 16:19	00013
11/6	4.	1738-05-15	chorale setting "Nun lieget alles unter dir" (= "Du Lebensfürst, Herr Jesu Christ", s. 4)	D maj.	SATB	2: 32	III/2.2: 198	after Z 5741b; text by Rist	11299
