= Bach's church music in Latin =

Most of Johann Sebastian Bach's extant church music in Latin—settings of (parts of) the Mass ordinary and of the Magnificat canticle—dates from his Leipzig period (1723–50). Bach started to assimilate and expand compositions on a Latin text by other composers before his tenure as Thomaskantor in Leipzig, and he continued to do so after he had taken up that post. The text of some of these examples by other composers was a mixture of German and Latin: also Bach contributed a few works employing both languages in the same composition, for example his early Kyrie "Christe, du Lamm Gottes".

The bulk of Bach's sacred music, many hundreds of compositions such as his church cantatas, motets, Passions, oratorios, four-part chorales and sacred songs, was set to a German text, or incorporated one or more melodies associated with the German words of a Lutheran hymn. His output of music on a Latin text, comprising less than a dozen of known independent compositions, was comparatively small: in Lutheranism, and Bach was a Lutheran, church services were generally in the native tongue, which was German for the places where Bach was employed. A few traditional Latin texts, such as the Magnificat and some excerpts of the Mass liturgy, had however not been completely banned from worship practice during the Protestant Reformation. It depended on local traditions whether any of such Latin texts were used in church services occasionally. In Leipzig, compared to Lutheran practice elsewhere, an uncharacteristic amount of Latin was used in church: it included music on Latin texts being performed on ordinary Sundays, on high holidays (Christmas, Easter, Pentecost), and the Magnificat also on Marian feasts (Annunciation, Visitation, Purification).

In his first years in Leipzig Bach produced a Latin Magnificat and several settings of the Sanctus. In 1733 he composed a large-scale Kyrie–Gloria Mass for the Catholic court in Dresden. Around the same time he produced the final version of his Magnificat. Probably around 1738–39 he wrote four more Kyrie–Gloria Masses, to a large extent based on earlier compositions. From around 1740 there was an increase of Bach copying and arranging stile antico Latin church music by other composers, which sheds light on a style shift towards more outspoken polyphonic and canonic structures in his own compositions in the last decade of his life. In the last years of his life Bach extracted a cantata on a Latin text from his 1733 Kyrie–Gloria Mass, and finally integrated that Mass, and various other earlier compositions, into his Mass in B minor.

Bach's involvement with Latin church music thus stemmed from several circumstances:

- Assimilating music on a Latin text by other composers (e.g. Bach's German version of Pergolesi's Stabat Mater);
- A certain, but limited, demand for Latin church music in the places where he was employed as church musician (e.g. his Magnificat);
- Bach reaching outside the confines of the circumstances of his employment, e.g. soliciting an appointment as Royal and Prince-Electoral court composer with his 1733 Kyrie-Gloria Mass.

That being identifiable motivations for his involvement with Latin church music, some questions remain however without conclusive answer, including:

- Did he compose the four Kyrie-Gloria Masses BWV 233–236 for Leipzig or for elsewhere?
- As Bach generally only composed music for which he had a performance opportunity in mind, which performance opportunity, if any, could he have been thinking of for his Mass in B minor?

From the early 19th century there was a renewed attention for Bach and his music: his Latin church music, including BWV Anh. 167 (published as a composition by Bach in 1805), the Magnificat (published in 1811), BWV 234 (published in 1818) and the Mass in B minor (heralded as "the greatest musical art work of all times and nations" in 1818), received a fair share of that renewed attention – the first 19th-century publication of a work for voices and orchestra on a German text only followed in 1821. In the second half of the 20th century Bach's compositions on a Latin text were grouped in the third chapter of the Bach-Werke-Verzeichnis.

== Settings of (parts of) the Latin mass liturgy ==
Bach composed five Kyrie–Gloria masses, the first of which was later expanded to the Mass in B minor. He also set the Sanctus part of the mass liturgy a few times, and copied and arranged mass-related compositions by other composers.

=== Mass in B minor, BWV 232, and related earlier compositions ===
Around 1748–49 Bach completed his Mass in B minor, BWV 232, based on various earlier compositions including cantata movements and the early versions of Part I Missa in B minor for the Dresden court (Kyrie–Gloria mass composed in 1733), of the first movement of Part II and of the Sanctus (Part III). The Mass in B minor is Bach's only setting of the complete ordinary of the mass.

==== Sanctus for six vocal parts (1724) ====
In 1724 Bach composed a Sanctus for six vocal parts (SSSATB) and elaborate orchestral score for the Christmas service. Bach revised it when he reused it in the Mass in B minor, changing its initial vocal scoring to SSAATB, and its meter from ₵ to C.

==== Mass for the court at Dresden (1733) ====
In 1733, Bach composed an extended Kyrie–Gloria mass for the court in Dresden, a setting of two parts of the Latin mass, the Kyrie and Gloria, scored for five vocal parts and orchestra.

==== Cantata Gloria in excelsis Deo, BWV 191 (around 1745) ====
Bach used three movements of the Gloria of his 1733 Mass for the Dresden court to compose the cantata Gloria in excelsis Deo, BWV 191, possibly for a performance in 1745. The cantata was composed for a Christmas service sometime in the mid-1740s (between 1743 and 1746).

==== Mass in B minor, BWV 232 (around 1748–49) ====
In the last years of his life, Bach integrated the complete Mass for the Dresden court as Kyrie and Gloria in his Mass in B minor, his only complete mass (in Latin: missa tota). Scoring and structure are identical with the later work. Another part of this Mass was derived from the 1724 Sanctus for six vocal parts. Also the music of several movements of his earlier German cantatas was integrated in this mass.

Hans Georg Nägeli described the work, in 1818, as "the greatest musical art work of all times and nations."

=== Kyrie–Gloria masses, BWV 233–236 (1738–39?) ===
Apart from the 1733 Missa in B minor for the Dresden court (later incorporated in the Mass in B minor), Bach wrote four further Kyrie–Gloria masses. These compositions, consisting of the first two sections of the Mass ordinary (i.e. the Kyrie and the Gloria), have been indicated as Missae breves (Latin for "short masses") or Lutheran Masses. They seem to have been intended for liturgical use, considering a performance time of about 20 minutes each, the average duration of a Bach cantata. They may have been composed around 1738/39. Possibly they were written for Count Franz Anton von Sporck or performed by him in Lysá.

Each of the Kyrie-Gloria Masses is in six movements: the Kyrie is one choral movement (with Kyrie/Christe/Kyrie subdivisions) and the Gloria is in five movements. The first and last movement of the Gloria are also choral, framing three arias for different voice types. The music consists mostly of parodies of earlier cantata movements. Bach changed the music slightly to adjust to the Latin words, but kept the original instrumentation.

==== Kyrie–Gloria Mass in F major, BWV 233 ====
For the Missa in F major, BWV 233, scored for horns, oboes, bassoon, strings, SATB, and basso continuo, Bach derived most of the six movements from earlier cantatas as parodies.

==== Kyrie–Gloria Mass in A major, BWV 234 ====
For the Missa in A major, BWV 234, scored for flute, strings, SATB, and basso continuo, Bach parodied music from at least four earlier cantatas.

In 1818 this was one of a very few of Bach's compositions for voices and orchestra to appear in print prior the Bach Gesellschaft complete edition in the second half of the 19th century.

==== Kyrie–Gloria Mass in G minor, BWV 235 ====
For the Missa in G minor, BWV 235, scored for oboes, strings, SATB, basso continuo, Bach derived all six movements from cantatas as parodies.

==== Kyrie–Gloria Mass in G major, BWV 236 ====
For the Missa in G major, BWV 236, scored for oboes, strings, SATB, basso continuo, Bach derived all six movements from cantatas as parodies.

=== Separate movements, copies, and arrangements ===
Bach composed and copied separate movements on a text extracted from the Mass ordinary. He also copied and arranged larger Mass compositions (mostly Kyrie–Gloria masses).

==== Sanctus in C major, BWV 237 (1723?) ====
Bach composed the Sanctus in C major for SATB choir and orchestra, BWV 237, possibly for St. John's Day, 24 June 1723.

==== Sanctus in D major, BWV 238 (1723) ====
Bach's Sanctus in D major, BWV 238, for SATB choir and orchestra, was first performed on Christmas, 25 December 1723.

==== Sanctus in D minor, BWV 239, after Gloria of Caldara's Missa Providentiae (Bach manuscript from 1738-41) ====
Bach's manuscript of the Sanctus in D minor, BWV 239, dates from around 1738 to 1741. It is a composition for SATB voices, string orchestra and continuo, based on the Gloria of Antonio Caldara's Missa Providentiae.

==== Sanctus in G major, BWV 240 (Bach manuscript from 1742) ====
Bach's manuscript of the Sanctus in G major, BWV 240, dates from 1742. The authenticity of this composition for SATB choir and orchestra is however doubted.

==== Sanctus, BWV 241, arranged from Kerll's Missa superba (Bach manuscript from 1747–48) ====
The Sanctus for double SATB choir and orchestra, BWV 241, is Bach's arrangement of the Sanctus of Johann Caspar Kerll's Missa superba. Bach's manuscript of this Sanctus setting was written between July 1747 and August 1748.

==== Kyrie–Gloria Mass in C minor after Durante, BWV 242 and Anh. 26 (Bach manuscript from 1727–32) ====
In the period from 1727 to 1732 Bach produced the manuscript of a Kyrie–Gloria Mass in C minor for SATB choir and orchestra, BWV Anh. 26, based on a composition by Francesco Durante. Bach's manuscript included his own setting of a "Christe eleison", BWV 242. Elsewhere in the score there are some instances of Bach adjusting the text placement.

==== Sanctus in F major, BWV 325 (four-part chorale) ====
BWV 325 is a four-part chorale by Bach, in F major, which appears with the text "Heilig, heilig, heilig" (i.e. the German translation of the Sanctus) in Part III (1786) of Breitkopf's first edition of Bach's chorale harmonisations, edited by C. P. E. Bach. In Part IV (1787) of the same edition the setting appears under the title "Sanctus, Sanctus Dominus Deus Sabaoth", that is the Latin text of the Sanctus. The hymn tune used for this setting is derived from the melody of Sanctus minus summus, published in meter-less music notation in 1557 (Zahn No. 8633). The common time version of the tune (Zahn No. 8634) did not appear in print before the Breitkopf edition of Bach's chorales.

==== Masses from Bassani's Acroama missale (copied 1736–40) and Credo intonation in F major, BWV 1081 (added 1747–48) ====
The Acroama missale is a collection of six Mass settings by Giovanni Battista Bassani, first published in Augsburg in 1709. Between 1736 and 1740 Bach had these six Masses copied, without the Benedictus and Agnus Dei, writing himself the Credo lyrics in the score. BWV 1081 is a Credo intonation in F major for SATB choir which Bach composed in 1747–48 as an insertion in the fifth of these masses.

==== Kyrie–Gloria Mass in A minor, BWV Anh. 24, after Pez's Missa Sancti Lamberti (Bach manuscript from 1715–17 and 1724) ====
BWV Anh. 24 is a Kyrie and Gloria in A minor after the Missa Sancti Lamberti by Johann Christoph Pez. The Kyrie was copied, and expanded with a melody line different from the continuo, in Weimar (1715–17). The Gloria was copied without modification in Leipzig (1724).

==== Kyrie-Gloria Mass in C major, BWV Anh. 25 (Bach manuscript from 1740–42) ====
BWV Anh. 25 is a Kyrie–Gloria Mass in C major, sometimes attributed to Johann Ludwig Bach: copied by J. S. Bach c.1740-1742.

==== Sanctus in F major by Johann Ludwig Krebs, BWV Anh. 27 ====
BWV Anh. 27 is a Sanctus in F major by Johann Ludwig Krebs.

==== Sanctus in B major, BWV Anh. 28 ====
BWV Anh. 28 is a Sanctus in B major by an unknown composer.

==== Continuo part of a Kyrie-Gloria Mass in C minor, BWV Anh. 29 (Bach manuscript from 1714–17) ====
BWV Anh. 29 is a Kyrie-Gloria Mass in C minor of which only the continuo part survives, found in a manuscript Bach wrote in the period from 1714 to 1717.

==== Missa super cantilena "Allein Gott in der Höh' sei Ehr", BWV Anh. 166 (Bach manuscript from 1729) ====
BWV Anh. 166 is a Kyrie–Gloria Mass in E minor composed in 1716 by Johann Ludwig Bach, known as Missa super cantilena "Allein Gott in der Höh' sei Ehr", JLB 38. Previously the work had also been attributed to Johann Nicolaus Bach. The part scores were written out by J. S. Bach and others for performance in 1729. In his copy, J. S. Bach added 5 bars of music at the beginning of the Gloria. J. S. Bach's variant of the incipit of the Gloria is rendered in Vol. 41 of the Bach-Gesellschaft Ausgabe. The text of the Gloria is partly in German: it intersperses the Latin text of the Gloria with, as cantus firmus, all four stanzas of "Allein Gott in der Höh sei Ehr" (which is itself a paraphrase of the Gloria), a Lutheran hymn by Nicolaus Decius and Joachim Slüter.

==== Kyrie–Gloria Mass in G major, BWV Anh. 167 (Bach manuscript completed 1738–39) ====
BWV Anh. 167 is a Kyrie–Gloria Mass in G major for double choir attributed to Christoph Bernhard, Johann Philipp Krieger or David Pohle, formerly also attributed to Johann Ludwig Bach and Antonio Lotti. One of its 18th-century manuscript copies, produced 1732–35 and 1738–39, is partially in J.S. Bach's handwriting. Published and performed as J. S. Bach's in 1805.

==== Kyrie–Gloria Mass, BNB I/P/2, after Palestrina's Missa sine nomine a 6 (Bach manuscript from c. 1742) ====
Around 1742 Bach arranged the Kyrie and the Gloria of Palestrina's Missa sine nomine a 6, and copied the other movements of this Mass, up to the Agnus dei, without modification (BNB I/P/2; BWV deest). Bach transposed the Kyrie and Gloria sections from D minor to E minor and provided a colla parte orchestration for these sections, written out as performance parts for a Kyrie–Gloria Mass for SSATTB choir, and an orchestra consisting of cornets, trombones and continuo.

==== Kyrie and Gloria of Gasparini's Missa canonica (copied and orchestrated by Bach c. 1740) ====
Bach's manuscript copy of Francesco Gasparini's Missa canonica, BNB deest, was rediscovered in Weißenfels in 2013. Bach probably performed his orchestrated version of the Kyrie and Gloria of this mass several times in Leipzig. The Bach-Archiv Leipzig, whose Deputy Director Peter Wollny discovered the Bach autograph, stated that it was an important model for Bach in his exploration of the stile antico and of the canon in his last decade.

== Magnificat settings ==
Bach composed the Magnificat in E-flat major, BWV 243a, in 1723, and then revised it around 1733 to the better known Magnificat in D major, BWV 243. In the early 1740s he copied and arranged two Magnificats by other composers, apparently in view of performing them.

=== Magnificat in E-flat major, BWV 243a (1723) ===
A few weeks after arriving at his new post as Thomaskantor in Leipzig in 1723, Bach presented a Magnificat for SSATB voices and orchestra at the Marian feast of Visitation (2 July)

Later that year, for Christmas, he presented this Magnificat again, with additionally four inserted hymns, partly in German and partly in Latin, related to the celebration of that feast.

=== Magnificat in D major, BWV 243 (1733) ===
In 1733 Bach again presented this Magnificat, but transposed to the key of D major and in a somewhat more elaborated orchestration, for the feast of Visitation. It is this version of his Magnificat that would become the most frequently performed version.

=== Bach's copy and arrangement of Caldara's Magnificat in C major, BNB I/C/1 and BWV 1082 (early 1740s) ===
BNB I/C/1 refers to Bach's copy of a Magnificat in C major by Antonio Caldara. Bach started to copy Caldara's Magnificat on 31 May 1740 and completed his manuscript, later classified as D-B Mus. ms. 2755, Fascicle 1, in 1742. Bach's manuscript also contained a reworked version (i.e., expanded with two upper voices) of the "Suscepit Israel" movement in E minor: Bach's arrangement of that movement is known as BWV 1082.

=== Bach's version of Torri's Magnificat, BWV Anh. 30 (c.1742) ===
Around 1742 Bach copied Pietro Torri's Magnificat in C major for double SATB choir and orchestra, and then arranged it by adding a third trumpet part and a timpani part. That Torri was the composer of the original work was only discovered in 2012: before that, the work had been attributed to Bach and to Antonio Lotti, and had been classified as BWV Anh. 30 in Anh. II, that is the Anhang of doubtful works, in all 20th-century editions of the Bach-Werke-Verzeichnis.

== Other adaptations of compositions originally on a Latin text ==
Bach parodied and arranged Latin church music by other composers to church music on a German text.

=== Tilge, Höchster, meine Sünden, BWV 1083, after Pergolesi's Stabat Mater (1745–47) ===
Tilge, Höchster, meine Sünden, BWV 1083, is Bach's adaptation of Pergolesi's 1736 Stabat Mater. Bach's parody, written around 1745–47, used a German version of Psalm 51 as text.

=== Der Gerechte kömmt um, after Tristis est anima mea attributed to Kuhnau (1723–50?) ===
Der Gerechte kömmt um, BC C 8, is a motet on a German text parodied from the Latin Tristis est anima mea motet attributed to Johann Kuhnau, Bach's predecessor as Thomaskantor in Leipzig. On stylistic grounds the arrangement, including a transposition from F minor to E minor and an instrumental accompaniment, is attributed to Bach.

== Hymns on a mixed German and Latin text ==
Vopelius' 1682 Neu Leipziger Gesangbuch, the hymnal that was in use in Bach's Leipzig, contains a few hymns on a mixed German and Latin macaronic text. According to Vopelius the usage originated in the time of Petrus of Dresden, a German-language Hussite active in the early 15th century: at the time native-language hymns, such as those sung by the Hussites, were barred from official church practice. As a response the Hussites sought, and eventually received, permission to mix native-language phrases in an otherwise Latin text. Examples include:

- "In dulci jubilo" (Neu Leipziger Gesangbuch pp. 39–40): harmonised by Bach as BWV 368 (also chorale preludes BWV 608 and 729)
- "Virga Jesse floruit" (Neu Leipziger Gesangbuch pp. 77–83): partly included as fourth laudes of the Christmas version of Bach's Magnificat (also: two of these four laudes are in German, two in Latin).

== Discography ==
BWV 191, Gloria in excelsis Deo
See Gloria in excelsis Deo, BWV 191#Selected recordings

BWV 232(a), Missa/Mass in B minor
See Mass in B minor discography

BWV 233–236, Kyrie-Gloria masses
See Kyrie–Gloria masses, BWV 233–236#Discography

BWV 237–242, separate Sanctus and Christe Eleison compositions
See also Sanctus in D minor, BWV 239#Recordings

- Sanctus BWV 238: Brilliant Classics 99376/4
- Sanctus BWV 237, 239 and 240: Mona Spägele, Harry Van Berne, Stephan Schreckenberger, Christiane Iven, Bremen Baroque Orchestra, Alsfelder Vokalensemble, Gesualdo Consort and others conducted by Wolfgang Helbich (before 2014)
- Sanctus BWV 241: Paul Steinitz conducting the London Bach Society and English Chamber Orchestra (1965)

BWV 243–243a, Magnificat
See Discography of Bach's Magnificat, Magnificat (Bach)#Reception history and Magnificat in E-flat major, BWV 243a#Selected recordings

BWV 1081–1082 and BWV Anh. 24–25

- BWV 1081–1082 and BWV Anh. 24–25: Mona Spägele, Harry Van Berne, Stephan Schreckenberger, Christiane Iven, Bremen Baroque Orchestra, Alsfelder Vocal Ensemble, Gesualdo Consort and others conducted by Wolfgang Helbich (before 2014)

BWV Anh. 30
See Pietro Torri#Discography

BWV Anh. 166
See Johann Ludwig Bach#Recordings

BWV Anh. 167
See Kyrie–Gloria Mass for double choir, BWV Anh. 167#21st century

== Sources ==
- Dörffel, Alfred (1884). "Statistik der Concerte im Saale des Gewandhauses zu Leipzig" [Statistic of the concerts in the Gewandhaus hall in Leipzig]. Geschichte der Gewandhausconcerte zu Leipzig vom 25. November 1781 bis 25. November 1881: Im Auftrage der Concert-Direction verfasst [History of the Gewandhaus concerts in Leipzig from 25 November 1781 to 25 November 1881: As commissioned by the concert direction] (in German). Leipzig.
- Dürr, Alfred; Kobayashi, Yoshitake, eds. (1998). Bach Werke Verzeichnis: Kleine Ausgabe – Nach der von Wolfgang Schmieder vorgelegten 2. Ausgabe [Bach Works Catalogue: Small Edition – After Wolfgang Schmieder's 2nd edition] (in German). Kirsten Beißwenger (collaborator). (BWV^{2a} ed.). Wiesbaden: Breitkopf & Härtel. ISBN 9783765102493. Preface in English and German.
- Forkel, Johann Nikolaus; Terry, Charles Sanford (1920). Johann Sebastian Bach: His Life, Art and Work – translated from the German, with notes and appendices. New York: Harcourt, Brace and Howe.
- Schicht, Johann Gottfried, ed. (1805). Messa a 8 voci reali e 4 ripiene coll'accompagnamento di due Orchestre, composta da Giov. Sebast. Bach: Partitura, copiata dalla partitura autografa dell' Autore [Mass in eight real voices and four additional voices, accompanied by two Orchestras, composed by Joh. Sebast. Bach: Score, copied from the autograph score of the Author] (in Italian and Latin). Leipzig: Breitkopf & Härtel. Harvard Digital Collections.
- Thielemann, Arne (2012). "Zur Identifizierung des Magnificats BWV Anh. 30 aus Johann Sebastian Bachs Notenbibliothek" [On the identification of the Magnificat BWV Anh. 30 from Johann Sebastian Bach's music library]. In Wollny, Peter (ed.). Bach-Jahrbuch 2012 [Bach Yearbook 2012]. Bach-Jahrbuch (in German). Vol. 98. Neue Bachgesellschaft. Leipzig: Evangelische Verlagsanstalt. pp. 217–224. doi:10.13141/bjb.v2012. ISBN 978-3-374-02668-5. ISSN 0084-7682.
- Torri, Pietro (2013). Thielemann, Arne (ed.). Magnificat in C: BWV Anh. 30. Stuttgarter Bach-Ausgaben. Vol. Full score. Bach, Johann Sebastian (arranger); Horn, Paul (basso continuo realization). Stuttgart: Carus. 35.012.
- Wolff, Christoph (1968). Stile antico in der Musik Johann Sebastian Bachs: Studien zu Bachs Spätwerk [Stile antico in the music of Johann Sebastian Bach: Studies on Bach's late work]. Beihefte zum Archiv für Musikwissenschaft (in German). Vol. VI. Wiesbaden: Steiner. OCLC 651793960.
- Wollny, Peter (2015). "Vom „apparat der auserleßensten kirchen Stücke" zum „Vorrath an Musicalien, von J. S. Bach und andern berühmten Musicis": Quellenkundliche Ermittlungen zur frühen Thüringer Bach-Überlieferung und zu einigen Weimarer Schülern und Kollegen Bachs". Bach-Jahrbuch 2015 [Bach Yearbook 2015]. Bach-Jahrbuch (in German). Vol. 101. Neue Bachgesellschaft. Leipzig: Evangelische Verlagsanstalt. ISBN 978-3-374-04320-0. ISSN 0084-7682.
