= Francesco Palmieri =

Francesco Palmieri is the name of:

- Francesco Palmieri (footballer)
- Francesco Palmieri (poet)
