= Georg Muffat =

German composer and organist

- Born: 1 June 1653; Megève, Duchy of Savoy
- Died: 23 February 1704 (aged 50)
- Genres: Baroque
- Occupations: Composer, organist
- Instrument: Organ

Georg Muffat (1 June 1653 – 23 February 1704) was a Baroque composer and organist. He is best known for the remarkably articulate and informative performance directions printed along with his collections of string pieces Florilegium Primum and Florilegium Secundum (First and Second Bouquets) in 1695 and 1698.

== Life ==
Georg Muffat was born in Megève, Duchy of Savoy (now in France), of André Muffat (of Scottish descent) and Marguerite Orsyand. He studied in Paris between 1663 and 1669, where his teacher is often assumed to have been Jean Baptiste Lully. This assumption is largely based on the statement "For six years ... I avidly pursued this style which was flowering in Paris at the time under the most famous Jean Baptiste Lully." This is ambiguous (in all of the languages in which it was printed) as to whether the style was flourishing under Lully, or that Muffat studied under Lully. In any case, the style which the young Muffat learned was unequivocally Lullian and it remains likely, though unevidenced, that he had at least some contact with the man himself.

After leaving Paris, he became an organist in Molsheim and Sélestat. Later, he studied law in Ingolstadt, afterwards settling in Vienna. He could not get an official appointment, so he travelled to Prague in 1677, then to Salzburg, where he worked for the archbishop for some ten years. In about 1680, he traveled to Italy, there studying the organ with Bernardo Pasquini, a follower of the tradition of Girolamo Frescobaldi; he also met Arcangelo Corelli, whose works he admired very much. From 1690 to his death, he was Kapellmeister to the bishop of Passau.

Georg Muffat should not be confused with his son Gottlieb Muffat, also a successful composer.

== Works ==
His works are strongly influenced by both French and Italian composers:

- Sonatas for various instruments (Armonico tributo 1682);
- Orchestral suites (Florilegium primum & secundum 1695);
- 12 Concerti grossi (Auserlesene... instrumental Musik 1701) re-using some thematic material from Armonico tributo
- 12 Toccatas for the organ as well as other pieces : passacaglia, chaconne, air with variations (Apparatus musico-organisticus 1690);
- some partitas for the harpsichord, kept as a manuscript
- several religious works (notably three masses, Salve Regina, etc.) from which only Missa in labore requies for twenty-four parts is preserved;
- 3 operas, all now lost ("Marina Armena"; "Königin Marianne die verleumdete Unschuld"; "La fatali felicità di Plutone").

Muffat was, as Johann Jakob Froberger before him, and Handel after him, a cosmopolitan composer who played an important role in the exchanges between European musical traditions. The information contained within the Florilegium Primum and Secundum is nearly unique. These performance directions were intended to assist German string players with the idiom of the French dance style, and include detailed rules for the tempo and order of bow strokes in various types of movement, as well as more general strategies for good ensemble playing and musicianship. These texts remain extremely valuable for modern historically-interested musicians.

== Media ==
- Toccata prima

Suite 2 - 1. Ouverture
Performed by the Advent Chamber Orchestra

Suite 2 - 2. Ballet
Performed by the Advent Chamber Orchestra

Suite 2 - 3. Bouree
Performed by the Advent Chamber Orchestra

Suite 2 - 4. Rondeau
Performed by the Advent Chamber Orchestra

Suite 2 - 5. Gavotte
Performed by the Advent Chamber Orchestra

Suite 2 - 6. Menuet 1 and 2
Performed by the Advent Chamber Orchestra

== Recordings ==
- Armonico Tributo by Les Muffatti (Ramée RAM0502)
- "Armonico Tributo & Florilegium Primum" by Ars Antiqua Austria & Gunar Letzbor
- 12 Concerti Grossi 1701 Musica Aeterna Bratislava (Naxos Records 8.555096, 8.555743)
- "12 Concerti Grossi 1701" by Capella Savaria & Pál Németh
- Toccate - Concerti da Chiesa, Martin Gester, Le Parlement de Musique, (Radio France - France Musique: Tempéraments TEM 316013)
- "Concertos I-VII" by Holland Baroque Society & Matthew Halls
- "Florilegium Secundum, Fasciculus I-IV" by The Academy of Ancient Music & Christopher Hogwood
- Apparatus musico-organisticus (Complete) by Adriano Falcioni, (Brilliant Classics 94493)
- Apparatus musico-organisticus. Douze toccatas pour orgue by René Saorgin, (Harmonia Mundi HMU966-967)
- Holland Baroque Society meets Matthew Halls: Georg Muffat Auserlesene mit Ernst und Lust gemengte Instrumentalmusic (Channel Classics CCS SA 27408) (SACD hybrid)
