= Les Muffatti =

Musical orchestra

The orchestra Les Muffatti was created in 1996 in and around the Royal Conservatory of Brussels by a group of twelve idealistic musicians who wanted to ensure that the Baroque music repertoire for string orchestra was sufficiently addressed in their education. The members agreed to work on several projects per year, inviting a different music director for each one.

When the group began to realize that its potential as a steady ensemble was growing quickly, and each member had specialized in Baroque strings, they decided, by the end of 2003, to present Les Muffatti to the public and give it a more official character. The group attracted new members and began to look for a regular music director, settling on Peter Van Heyghen, an internationally recognized specialist in performance practices of Renaissance and Baroque music. In June 2004, the ensemble performed its debut concert in Brussels under his direction.

Les Muffatti was promptly noticed by several concert organizers, and immediately invited to present concerts at the Concertgebouw, Bruges, the Handel Akademie in Karlsruhe, the Aqua Musica festival in Amsterdam, the festival Musica Antiqua Bruges, the Holland Oude Muziek festival in Utrecht, the Musica Sacra festival in Maastricht, and the Bozar concert series in Brussels.

The name Les Muffatti reflects not only what the ensemble considers to be its basic repertoire, but also its approach to performance practice. Georg Muffat (1653-1704), a cosmopolitan composer, is a key historical figure in the creation of the string orchestra, and one of the first authors to have clearly mapped out the main differences between French and Italian musical styles around 1700.

Les Muffatti's favorite repertoire consists of the various sinfonias, sonatas, concertos, and overtures for string orchestra composed between c. 1680 and 1740 by such composers as Georg Muffat, Arcangelo Corelli, Georg Philipp Telemann, Georg Friedrich Handel, and many others.

Future plans include focusing on Italian oratorios, serenatas, and intermezzi by Alessandro Scarlatti, Giovanni Bononcini, Antonio Caldara, Johann Adolph Hasse, and others; these are all compositions for string orchestra with an extended continuo section, a few vocal soloists, and the occasional wind instrument.

For these two types of repertoire, the ensemble attempts to present to the listener as many scores as possible, the original materials of which are preserved in Belgian music libraries.

From 2007 to 2009 Peter Van Heyghen will be artist in residence of the Augustinus Muziekcentrum (AMUZ) in Antwerp.

== Discography ==
- Georg Muffat: „Armonico Tributo“, Ramée RAM0502
- Johann Christoph Pez: Ouvertures – Concerti, Ramée RAM0705
- Giovanni Bononcini: San Nicola di Bari, Ramée RAM0806
- Giuseppe Sammartini: Concerti grossi, Solo Concertos, Overtures, Ramée RAM1008
- Jean-Marie Leclair: Violin concertos Op. 7, Luis Otavio di Santos (violin), Ramée RAM1202
- Reinhard Keiser: Brockes-Passion, Zsuzsi Tóth, Jan Van Elsacker, Peter Kooij, Ramée (Outhere) (RAM1303)
- George Frideric Handel: Arie per la Cuzzoni, Hasnaa Bennani, Ramée RAM1501
- Johann Sebastian Bach, Concertos for organ and strings, Bart Jacobs (organ), Ramée, 2019 (RAM1804)
- Nicola Porpora, Johann Adolf Hasse, Antonio Vivaldi, Salve Regina, Motets by Hasse and Porpora, Clint Van der Linde, countertenor, Ramée, 2022 (RAM2102)
- Johann Sebastian Bach, „Bach Triple“, Frank Theuns, Sophie Gent, Bertrand Cuiller, Ramée (Outhere) (RAM2301)
