= Francesco Palmieri (poet) =

Italian poet and musician (1659–1701)

- Born: 4 April 1659; Pisa, Grand Duchy of Tuscany
- Died: 7 October 1701 (aged 42); Hanover, Electorate of Brunswick-Lüneburg
- Occupations: Poet, musician, singer, librettist
- Known for: Member of the Arcadian Academy; music director at the Hanover court
- Parent(s): Pier Lorenzo Palmieri (father); Lucrezia da Paule (mother)

Francesco Palmieri (Pisa, 4 April 1659 – Hanover, 7 October 1701) was an Italian poet and musician.

Palmieri was the son of Pier Lorenzo Palmieri and Lucrezia da Paule, an aristocratic woman. He had a fine education, which included studies on rhetoric and philosophy. He moved to Rome c. 1675 and soon entered the service of Queen Christina of Sweden as a Gentiluomo Scudiere. He was elected to the Arcadian Academy in 1690, the year of its foundation. Although he published a collection of canzoni, most of his works were never printed. He was also the author of two unpublished oratorios, presumably written in Rome.

During the 1690s, he moved to Hanover. He wrote the libretto, and perhaps also the music, of a large-scale cantata (Accademia per musica) which was performed on 1 November 1695, to celebrate the marriage of Princess Charlotte Felicitas of Brunswick-Lüneburg to Duke Rinaldo I of Modena. The score is lost, but it appears from the libretto to have comprised seventeen numbers for five characters (Clio, Gloria, Giunone, Amore and Fato). Palmieri (also known as "Count Palmieri"), wrote the libretto of Briseide, the opera by Pietro Torri and Agostino Steffani, performed during carnival, 1696. From that year, when Steffani was continually away on diplomatic duties, Palmieri was general manager of music at the court of Hanover.

According to Crescimbeni, Palmieri was also an accomplished singer. In 1701 Sophia Charlotte of Hanover invited him to sing the leading role in the opera with which she planned to celebrate the foundation of the Kingdom of Prussia. However, it is doubtful whether the performance ever took place, for Palmieni died suddenly on 7 October. The queen had a monument erected in his memory, with an epitaph by Leibniz, and the dowager Electress Sophia of Hanover wrote a sympathetic letter to Palmieni's brother, Father Lorenzo Palmieri, revealing how well he was liked there.

== Links ==
- Palmieri, Francesco (1659–1701). Accademia della Crusca, 2014.
