= Johann Nicolaus Bach =

German composer

Johann Nicolaus Bach (or Johann Nikolaus Bach) (20 October [O.S. 10 October] 1669 – 4 November 1753) was a German composer of the Baroque period.

Johann Nicolaus was the eldest son of Johann Christoph Bach and the second cousin of Johann Sebastian Bach. He was educated at the University of Jena, where he later became organist. He was probably born at Eisenach, where his father was employed as a musician, attended the Eisenach Latin school until 1689, and was a student of the Jena city organist J.M. Knüpfer, a son of Sebastian Knüpfer; after an Italian sojourn in 1696, he became organist at the Stadtkirche and the Kollegiatkirche in Jena. He was influenced by Antonio Lotti. He later joined the Danish army. He then returned to Jena where he lived for the rest of his life. Few of his compositions survive. He was also a maker of harpsichords and organs.

Surviving pieces include a mass, two chorale preludes on "Nun freut euch, lieben Christen g'mein" and a Singspiel Der jenaische Wein- und Bierrufer, this in the form of a quodlibet on Jena student traditions.
