= Christus, der uns selig macht =

German Lutheran Passion hymn

- Lutheran Passion hymn
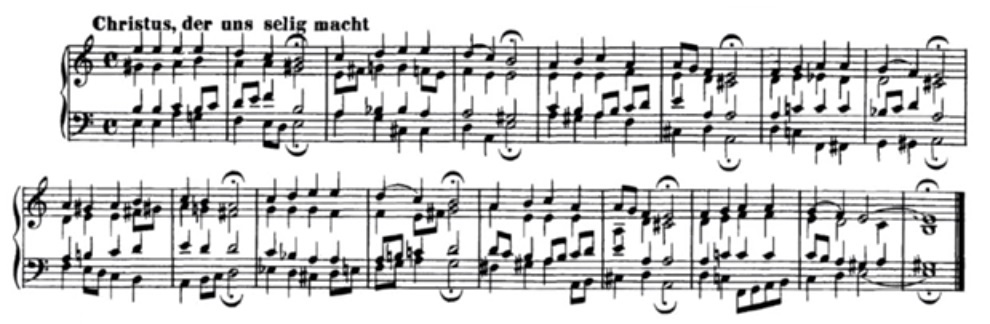
- Bach's setting of the hymn in his St John Passion
- English: "Christ who hath us blessed made"
- Catalogue: Zahn 6283
- Occasion: Passion
- Text: Michael Weiße
- Language: German
- Melody: Bohemian Brethren
- Composed: 1501
- Published: 1531

"Christus, der uns selig macht" (literally: Christ who makes us blessed) is a German Lutheran Passion hymn in eight stanzas in German by Michael Weiße, written in 1531 as a translation of the Latin hymn "Patris Sapientia" to an older melody of the Bohemian Brethren.

The hymn inspired musical settings, both vocal and for organ, notably Bach's St John Passion, where the first and last stanzas comment on biblical scenes in two different settings. The hymn is part of the Protestant hymnal as EG 77. It was translated to "Christ, by whose all-saving Light" and other versions.

== History ==
Weiße wrote the text as a translation of the Latin hymn "Patris Sapientia", attributed to Aegidius of Collonna, from the Liturgy of the Hours for Good Friday. The text of the Latin hymn follows the seven station hours in Christ's suffering that day, and relates to the canonical hours from Matins to Compline. Weiße added an eighth stanza as a summary. Each of the seven translated stanzas narrates a situation of the Passion, beginning with Jesus being arrested "like a thief" ("als ein Dieb") in the early morning hours; the final stanza is a prayer, "O hilf, Christ, Gottes Sohn" (O help, Christ, God's Son), requesting help to commemorate the Passion fruitfully ("fruchtbarlich"), to remain faithful to Jesus and avoid all wrongdoing, and to give thanks.

Weiße published his text in 1531 in his hymnal Ein New Gesengbuchlen for the Bohemian Brethren, with a melody known from the beginning of the 15th century and used in Czech congregations in Bohemian Hussite hymnals.

In the current German Protestant hymnal Evangelisches Gesangbuch (EG), the hymn is number 77, appearing in all eight stanzas with only slight changes. The hymn was translated to English in several versions, for example "Christ, by whose all-saving Light" by Johann Christian Jacobi.

== Text and tune ==
In his 1531 publication, Weiße used the same hymn tune for "Christus, wahrer Gottes Sohn" and "Christus, der uns selig macht" (Zahn No. 6283a). Johannes Zahn describes the late 16th-century variant of the tune, Zahn No. 6283b, as a deterioration ("verschlechternde Umbildung"). Johann Sebastian Bach used the Zahn 6283b version of the tune in his compositions. The first stanza of the hymn, (Note: Translation: Christ, who makes us blessed / and has done no wrong, / was for us in the night / seized like a thief, / led before godless people / and falsely accused, / derided, mocked and spat upon, / as the scripture says.) as harmonized in Bach's St John Passion, goes as follows:

== Music ==
In his St John Passion, Bach used two stanzas: the second part opens with the first stanza, "Christus, der uns selig macht" (Christ, who hath us blessed made), which summarises what Jesus had to endure although innocent ("made captive, ... falsely indicted, and mocked and scorned and bespat"), while the scene of the Crucifixion ends with the final stanza, "O hilf, Christe, Gottes Sohn" (O help, Christ, O Son of God). Bach's organ chorale prelude BWV 620 from the Orgelbüchlein is based on the same Passiontide hymn. The other chorale prelude BWV 747 with the same title does not show Bach's usual craftmanship: it probably dates from around 1750, so is possibly a transcription of an ensemble work "cobbled together" by a younger composer.

Seven of the eight stanzas are used in the mid-18th century pasticcio Passion oratorio Wer ist der, so von Edom kömmt in movements 2, 24, 27, 30, 38, 40 and 42. Mauricio Kagel quoted the hymn, paraphrased to "Bach, der uns selig macht", in his oratorio Sankt-Bach-Passion about Bach's life, composed for the tricentenary of Bach's birth in 1985.
