= Magnificat (Torri) =

1690s setting of the Magnificat by Pietro Torri

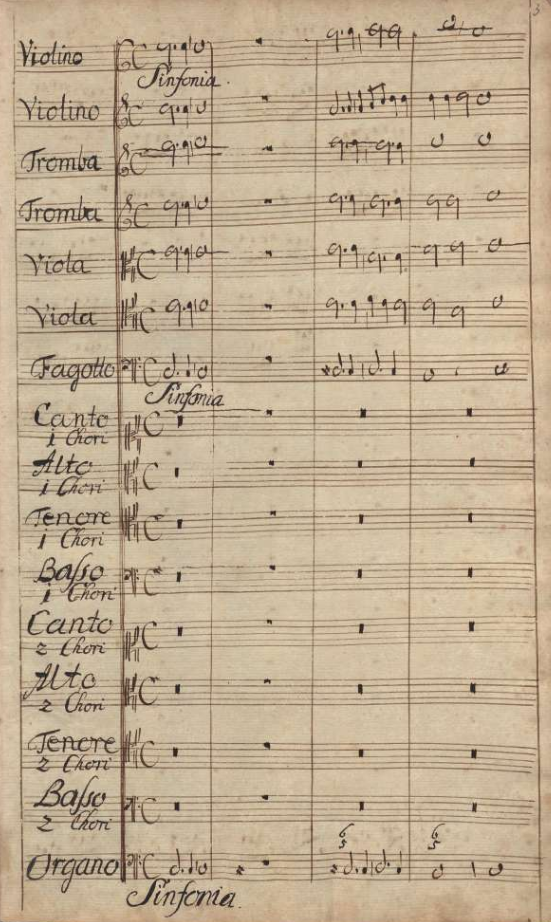
First page of a manuscript score of Pietro Torri's Magnificat (copy from the Bokemeyer collection).

Pietro Torri's Magnificat in C major, a setting of the biblical Canticle of Mary, the Magnificat, for double choir and orchestra likely dates from the 1690s. The work is scored for two SATB choirs, two trumpets, bassoon, strings and basso continuo. Its music opens with an instrumental introduction (sinfonia). Most of the composition's movements are either choral movements, in which all singers and instruments participate, or duets for two singers and a more limited instrumental accompaniment.

The Magnificat in C major, BWV Anh. 30, is Johann Sebastian Bach's arrangement of Torri's Magnificat. In Bach's version of the work, which originated around 1742, there are an additional trumpet and timpani. Both Torri's original and Bach's arrangement were recorded in the first decade of the 21st century. Shortly after the second of these recordings was released in 2012, it was discovered that BWV Anh. 30 was an arrangement of Torri's Magnificat. Before that, Bach's version had been attributed to various composers, including Antonio Lotti.

== History ==
Pietro Torri likely wrote his Magnificat in the 1690s, when he was in the service of Maximilian II Emanuel, Elector of Bavaria. In that period Torri followed his employer to the Spanish Netherlands (1692) and was later deputized to Hanover (1696), only returning to Bavaria in 1701. In the early 1790s Torri wrote scenic works such as L'ambizione fulminata and Gli amori di Titone e d'Aurora for Munich, and I Preggi della primavera for Anna Maria Luisa de' Medici, Electress Palatine at Leuchtenberg.

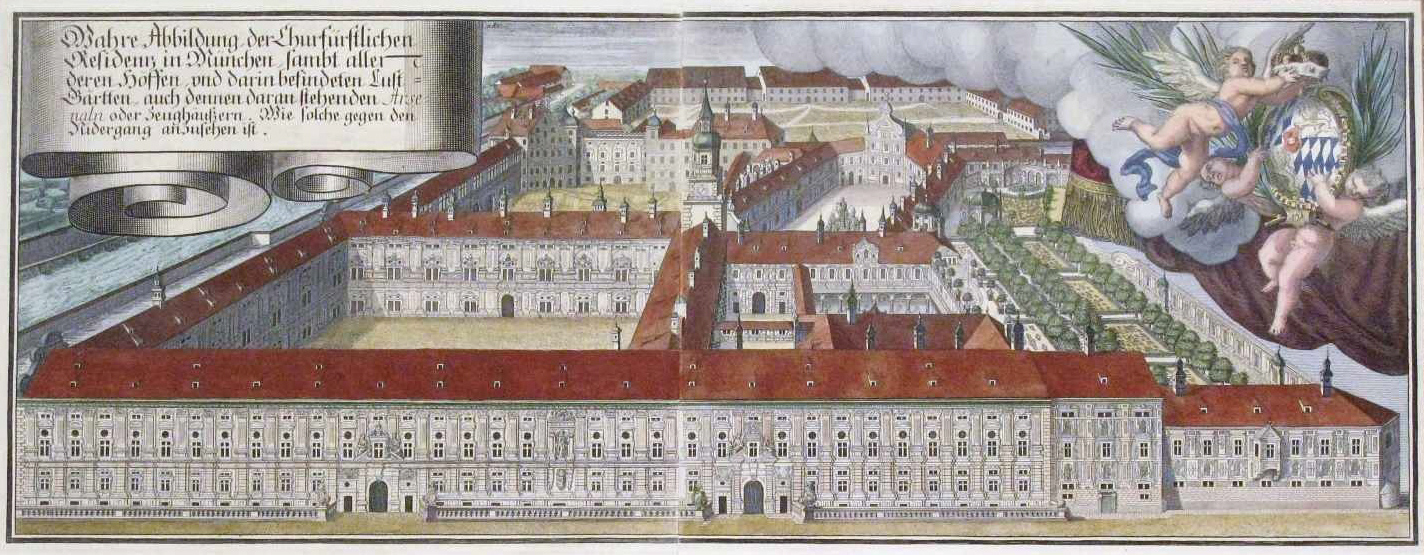
Munich Residenz, the palace of Torri's employer Max Emanuel, around the time when Torri worked there.

S. Vinceslao, Abelle and S. Landelino are oratorios Torri likely wrote for Brussels between 1692 and 1701. Secular works of this period include the Trastulli, a collection of 60 short vocal works, and Briseide, a dramma per musica staged in Hanover. In 1704 Torri was back in the Netherlands, and a few years later, still in the retinue of the Bavarian elector, in French territory.

He returned to Munich in 1715, where he would remain till the end of his life, composing still over 20 new operas and other stage works, at a rate of around one every year. Among his liturgical compositions of this period is a Requiem mass for the Elector, who died in 1726, after which Torri remained in the service of Charles Albert, son and successor of Maximilian II Emanuel. Torri's Magnificat disseminated via manuscript copies: one of such manuscripts, from the Bokemeyer collection, is conserved in the Berlin State Library, another is in the British Library.

== Scoring and structure ==
The text of Torri's Magnificat is the Latin version of the Biblical canticle "My soul doth magnify the Lord" from the first chapter of the Gospel of Luke (10 verses), followed by the Minor Doxology Gloria Patri. The composition is in C major.

=== Scoring ===
Torri's Magnificat is set à 15 et più (for 15 voices and more):

- double SATB choir (8 voices),
- two trumpets (Tr; 2 voices),
- bassoon (Ba; 1 voice),
- strings (4 voices): two violin (Vl) parts and two viola (Va) parts,

and basso continuo (Bc; figured bass for the organ). When both bassoon and organ play, the former's voice is almost entirely identical to the bass line of the latter. The 15 voices can also be defined as singers (8), trumpets (2), strings (4) and basso continuo (1), meaning that the bassoon can be seen as part of the continuo group, together with the organ.

=== Movements ===
Verses of the Magnificat in Torri's setting
Magnificat verses		Text	Torri's Magnificat (with performance time)		
			1.	Sinfonia ([no tempo]; Vivace [et allegro]; Adagio): orchestra (tutti)	3:49
1.	Magnificat anima mea Dominum.	Luke 1:46	1.	SI and SII (unisono), orchestra (tutti)	3:49
2.	Et exultavit spiritus meus in Deo salutari meo.	Luke 1:47	1.	Tutti: SATBI, SATBII, orchestra	3:49
3.	Quia respexit humilitatem ancillae suae ecce enim ex hoc beatam me dicent omnes generationes.	Luke 1:48	2. 6/8	Duet: AI, TI, Tr1, Tr2, Bc	1:35
4.	Quia fecit mihi magna qui potens est et sanctum nomen ejus.	Luke 1:49	3.	Duet: SI, BI, Bc	1:49
5.	Et misericordia ejus a progenie in progenies timentibus eum.	Luke 1:50	4.	SATBI, Bc	2:45
6.	Fecit potentiam in brachio suo dispersit superbos mente cordis sui.	Luke 1:51	5.	Duet: AII, TII, Vl1, Vl2, Bc	2:26
7.	Deposuit potentes de sede et exaltavit humiles.	Luke 1:52	6.	Tutti: SATBI, SATBII, orchestra	1:04
8.	Esurientes implevit bonis et divites dimisit inanes.	Luke 1:53	6.	Tutti: SATBI, SATBII, orchestra	1:04
9.	Suscepit Israel puerum suum recordatus misericordiae suae.	Luke 1:54	7. 6/8	Duet: SII, BII, Bc	1:48
10.	Sicut locutus est ad patres nostros Abraham et semini ejus in saecula.	Luke 1:55	8. 3/2	Tutti: SATBI, SATBII, orchestra	0:28
11.	Gloria Patri, et Filio et Spiritui Sancto.	Doxology	8. 3/2	Tutti: SATBI, SATBII, orchestra	0:24
12.	Sicut erat in principio, et nunc, et semper et in saecula saeculorum. Amen.	Doxology	9.	Tutti: SATBI, SATBII, orchestra	3:02

==== First movement ====
After an orchestral introduction, dominated by tutti chords, the sopranos of both choirs sing the first verse of the canticle in unison, on the tune of sixth Psalm tone setting of the Magnificat, while the trumpets play concertante, with an orchestral accompaniment. The second verse of the Magnificat follows in a monumental tutti setting for double choir and orchestra.

==== Second movement ====
The second movement, setting the third verse of the Magnificat, is a duet for the alto and tenor of the first choir, accompanied by both trumpets and the continuo.

==== Third movement ====
The third movement, setting the next verse of the Magnificat, is another duet: soprano and bass of the first choir sing, accompanied by the continuo.

==== Fourth movement ====
The fourth movement, taking a central place in the composition, is a stile antico setting of the fifth verse of the canticle, for all four voices of the first choir, and continuo.

==== Fifth movement ====
The fifth movement, setting the next verse of the Magnificat, is a duet for the alto and tenor of the second choir, accompanied by two violin voices, and continuo.

==== Sixth movement ====
The "Deposuit potentes" movement is a tutti setting of two verses of the Magnificat.

==== Seventh movement ====
The seventh movement, setting the ninth verse of the Magnificat, is the last duet, for soprano and bass of the second choir, and continuo.

==== Eighth movement ====
The eighth movement is again for all forces (tutti), setting the next verse of the Magnificat, and the first half of the Doxology.

==== Ninth movement ====
The final movement, also for tutti, is a broad fugue with three musical subjects, respectively introduced on the words:

- "Sicut erat in principio",
- "et in saecula saeculorum",
- "Amen".

In the course of the movement the musical texture grows ever more closer-knit.

== Bach's version (BWV Anh. 30) ==
Torri was, in the retinue of his employer Max Emanuel, in Brussels and Mons from 1704 to 1715. Ernest Augustus, Prince of Saxe-Weimar visited the Netherlands in 1707, where he may have met the Bavarian Elector and the composer. Peter Wollny thinks it likely that it was there that the Prince obtained a copy of Torri's Magnificat, which he brought back to Germany. That a copy of the work circulated in Thuringia before Torri's return to Munich is attested by an inventory written in Rudolstadt in 1714. Johann Sebastian Bach, who was employed by Ernest Augustus, then Duke of Saxe-Weimar, from 1708, thus likely knew Torri's Magnificat from his time in Weimar, and may have taken performance parts of the work with him when he left that city in 1717.

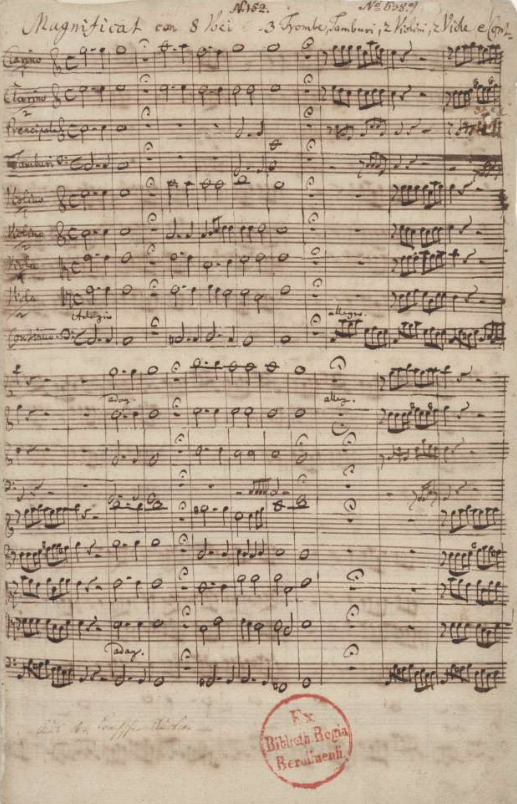
BWV Anh. 30: first page of Bach's manuscript of his arrangement of Torri's Magnificat

Bach copied Torri's Magnificat, likely from performance parts, around 1742 in Leipzig, where he was employed since 1723, likely in view of a performance of the work. Having copied the work without much modification apart from merging the parts for bassoon and organ in a single continuo part for unspecified instruments, he added a third trumpet (which he indicated as "Principale" in his manuscript) and timpani to the composition. Another minor adjustment is that Bach applies a caesura in the music between the end of the Gospel text and the start of the doxology, so that the composition has ten movements ("Gloria Patri" becoming the ninth, and the fugal "Sicut erat" as the tenth and last movement). Whether by omission or because he didn't know, Bach did not mention the composer of the original on his copy. Antonio Caldara's Magnificat in C major, which Bach copied and arranged around the same time (BNB I/C/1 and BWV 1082), carries the name of the original composer in the header of Bach's manuscript.

By 1841 Bach's manuscript was owned by the Royal Library at Berlin (later converted to the Berlin State Library), where it was classified as Mus.ms. Bach P 195; before that it was owned by, among others, Bach's son Carl Philipp Emanuel, Bach's student Johann Christian Kittel, and, from 1809, Georg Poelchau, a collector of music by Bach and other Baroque composers. Kittel and Poelchau both thought that the Magnificat for eight voices and orchestra was composed by Bach. Kittel had a copy made of Bach's manuscript, and Poelchau added a flyleaf to it, on which he indicated Bach as its composer. In 1732, some two decades after he had published Bach's Magnificat (BWV 243.1), however, Poelchau had doubts about Bach's authorship of the Magnificat for double choir and orchestra, writing that it was likely composed by Caldara or Lotti.

The Bach Gesellschaft did not include the Magnificat for eight voices and orchestra in the collected edition it published of Bach's works in the second half of the 19th century. In the Bach-Werke-Verzeichnis (BWV) it was listed among Bach's doubtful works (Anh. II), as BWV Anh. 30. In 1968, Christoph Wolff mentioned Antonio Lotti as its possible composer. Before the end of the 20th century also the editors of the New Bach Edition had decided not to include the work in their complete edition of Bach's work. Only in 2012 was it discovered that, apart from Bach's modifications, BWV Anh. 30 was identical to Torri's Magnificat à 15 et più.

== Publication ==
In the 21st century Torri's Magnificat was recorded, and its score published.

=== Recordings ===
Original version
Included in Le Triomphe de la Paix, ORF CD 424, performed by Christoph Hammer conducting the Neue Hofkapelle München (2004 live recording, released 2005).
Bach's version
A recording of BWV Anh. 30 is included in Apocryphal Bach Masses II, cpo 777561-2, performed by Wolfgang Helbich conducting the Alsfelder Vokalensemble (recorded 2009, released 2012; recording time: 19:01). In 2014, this recording was re-issued in the 8 CD Box The Sacred Apocryphal Bach.

=== Score ===
In 2013 Carus-Verlag published Arne Thielemann's edition of Bach's version of Torri's Magnificat. The next year a facsimile of a manuscript copy of Torri's Magnificat became available on-line at the website of the Berlin State Library, in 2016 followed by a facsimile of Bach's manuscript of the BWV Anh. 30 version.

== Sources ==
- Beißwenger, Kirsten (2000). "Magnificat C-Dur (BWV Anh. 30)" [Magnificat C major (BWV Anh. 30)]. Lateinische Kirchenmusik, Passionen: Werke zweifelhafter Echtheit, Bearbeitungen fremder Kompositionen (Kritischer Bericht) [Latin Church Music, Passions: Works with Doubtful Authenticity, Arrangements of Music from other Composers (Critical Commentary)]. New Bach Edition (in German). Vol. II/9. Bärenreiter. p. 66. ISMN 9790006494927. BA 5095-41.
- Champlin, John Denison Jr. (1888–90). Apthorp, William Foster (ed.). Cyclopedia of Music and Musicians. New York: Charles Scribner's Sons. Vol. I, Vol. II, Vol. III (via Internet Archive)
- Dürr, Alfred; Kobayashi, Yoshitake, eds. (1998). Bach Werke Verzeichnis: Kleine Ausgabe – Nach der von Wolfgang Schmieder vorgelegten 2. Ausgabe [Bach Works Catalogue: Small Edition – After Wolfgang Schmieder's 2nd edition] (in German). Kirsten Beißwenger (collaborator). (BWV^{2a} ed.). Wiesbaden: Breitkopf & Härtel. ISBN 9783765102493. Preface in English and German.
- Rust, Wilhelm (1862). "Vorwort" [Preface]. Magnificat D dur und vier Sanctus [Magnificat in D major and four Sanctuses]. Bach-Gesellschaft Ausgabe (in German). Vol. 11. Bach Gesellschaft. Breitkopf & Härtel. pp. XIII–XXI.
- Sadie, Julie Anne (1998). "Munich". Companion to Baroque Music. Oxford University Press. pp. 242–245. ISBN 9780198167044.
- Thielemann, Arne (2012). "Zur Identifizierung des Magnificats BWV Anh. 30 aus Johann Sebastian Bachs Notenbibliothek" [On the identification of the Magnificat BWV Anh. 30 from Johann Sebastian Bach's music library]. In Wollny, Peter (ed.). Bach-Jahrbuch 2012 [Bach Yearbook 2012]. Bach-Jahrbuch (in German). Vol. 98. Neue Bachgesellschaft. Leipzig: Evangelische Verlagsanstalt. pp. 217–224. doi:10.13141/bjb.v2012. ISBN 978-3-374-02668-5. ISSN 0084-7682.
- Torri, Pietro (2013). Thielemann, Arne (ed.). Magnificat in C: BWV Anh. 30. Stuttgarter Bach-Ausgaben. Vol. Full score. Bach, Johann Sebastian (arranger); Horn, Paul (basso continuo realization). Stuttgart: Carus. 35.012.
- Wolff, Christoph (1968). Stile antico in der Musik Johann Sebastian Bachs: Studien zu Bachs Spätwerk [Stile antico in the music of Johann Sebastian Bach: Studies on Bach's late work]. Beihefte zum Archiv für Musikwissenschaft (in German). Vol. VI. Wiesbaden: Steiner. OCLC 651793960.
- Wollny, Peter (2015). "Vom "apparat der auserleßensten kirchen Stücke" zum "Vorrath an Musicalien, von J. S. Bach und andern berühmten Musicis": Quellenkundliche Ermittlungen zur frühen Thüringer Bach-Überlieferung und zu einigen Weimarer Schülern und Kollegen Bachs". Bach-Jahrbuch 2015. Bach-Jahrbuch (in German). Vol. 101. Neue Bachgesellschaft. Leipzig: Evangelische Verlagsanstalt. pp. 99–154. doi:10.13141/bjb.v2015. ISBN 978-3-374-04320-0. ISSN 0084-7682 – via Qucosa.
