= Pietro Torri =

Italian composer (c.1665–1737)

Pietro Torri (c. 1650 – 6 July 1737) was an Italian Baroque composer.

== Life ==
Torri was born in Peschiera del Garda, Republic of Venice. It is possible, but not certain, that soprano Anna Maria Torri was his sister. From 1684 to 1688, he served as the organist and choirmaster of the Margrave of Bayreuth, and later entered into the service of the Elector of Bavaria Maximilian II Emanuel. In 1692 he followed the prince with some gentlemen of the court orchestra to the Spanish Netherlands and later settled with them in Brussels where Torri married the daughter of the ballet master François Rodier.

Over the following years he lived in Mons, Namur, Lille, Compiègne, and Valenciennes; where his compositions were performed.

In 1715 he returned to Munich, where he occasionally composed cantatas; and an opera annually. In 1726 Maximilian died, and his son Charles Albert succeeded him to the throne of Bavaria. For this occasion, Torri composed a musical tribute to the new ruler: the allegorical cantata Bavaria. This work alluded to an early Bavarian claim to the throne of the Holy Roman Empire. On the death of Giuseppe Antonio Bernabei in 1732, he was finally officially appointed as choirmaster at the court of Bavaria. Charles Albert was elected emperor in 1726 as Charles VII Albert and Torri became a musician at the imperial court. He died in Munich.

== Compositions ==
His most famous works for voices and orchestra include his Magnificat (for some time erroneously attributed to Johann Sebastian Bach and Antonio Lotti), andLe Triomphe de la paix, a cantata celebrating the Treaty of Rastatt (1714).

=== Dramatic works ===
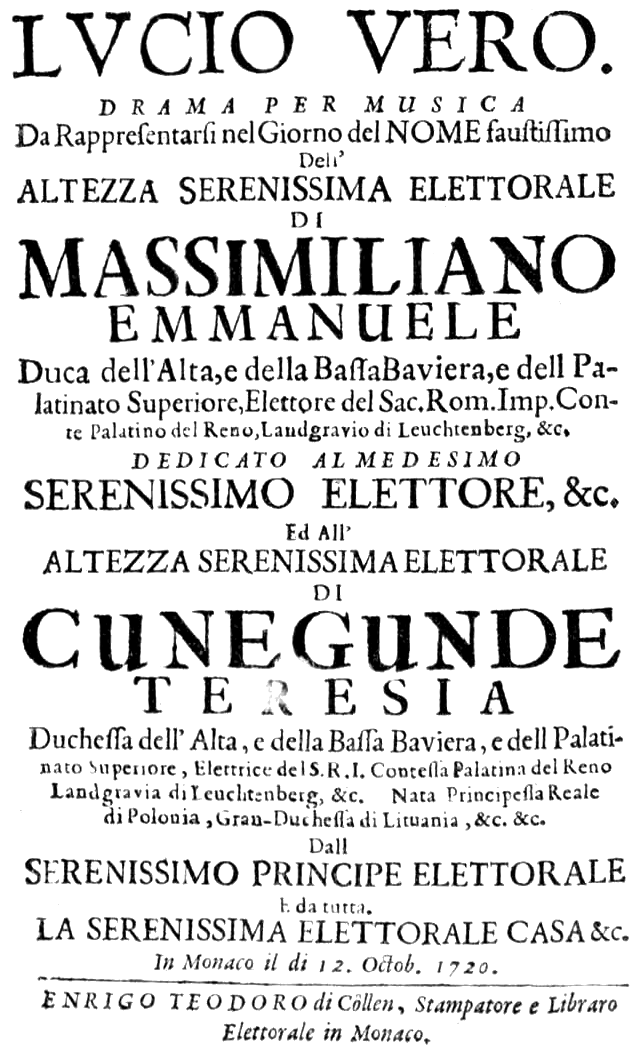
Title page of the libretto of Lucio Vero (Munich 1720)

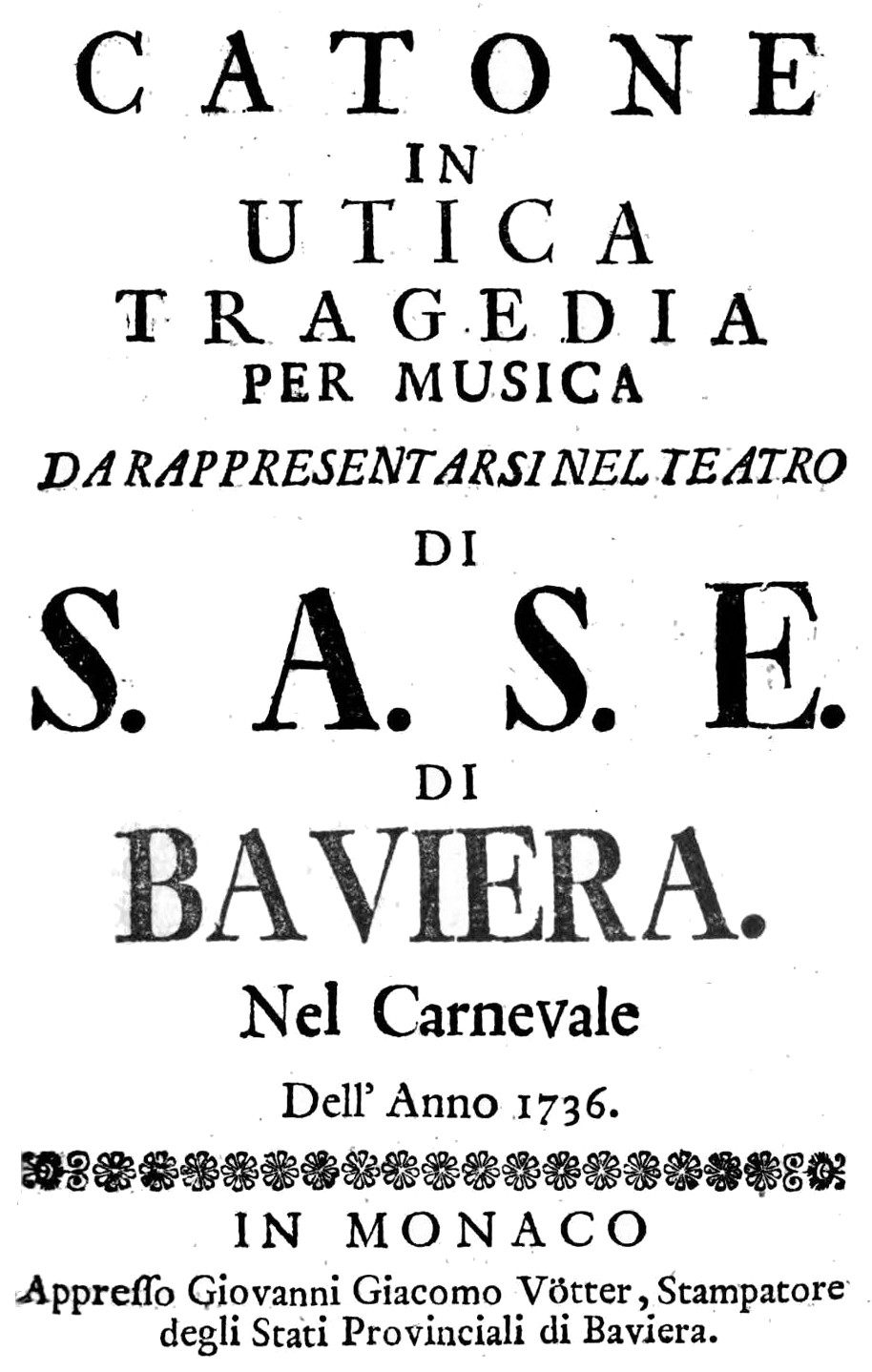
Title page of the libretto of Torri's Catone in Utica (Munich 1736)

Dramatic works by Pietro Torri
Title	Genre	Libretto	Date	Place	Occasion
L'innocente giustificato	dramma per musica	Pisani	1688	Bayreuth	Birthday of Margravine.
Fetonte	cantata		1689 Oct/Nov	Munich	Name day of Elector.
Gli oracoli di Pallade e di Nemesi	serenata (tourney)		6 February 1690	Munich	Tournament.
L'ambizione fulminata	opera buffa		1691	Munich	
I Preggi della primavera	serenata	Luigi Orlandi	1691 May(c.)	Leuchtenberg	For Electress Palatine.
Gli amori di Titone e d'Aurora	dramatic work		1691 Jul	Munich	
Le Peripezze della Fortuna	opera		1695 Jan.?	Brussels?	Marriage of Elector & Electress?
Il Giorno festivo (attr.)	cantata (tourney)		1695 Oct.	Brussels	Birthday of Electoral Prince.
S. Vinceslao	oratorio teatrale		1692–1701	Brussels?	
Santo Landelino	oratorio teatrale		1692–1701	Brussels?	
Briseide (attr.)	dramma per musica	Francesco Palmieri	1696 Feb.?	Hanover	Carnival.
Torneo ("Figli de' monti")	cantata (tourney)		30 January 1702	Munich	
Le Martir des Maccabées	dramatic oratorio		1707–1714		
L'Homme endormis	prologue		17 May 1712	Namur	
L'innocenza difesa dai Numi	opera		1712	Valenciennes	
Enone	pastorale		1713 Sep.?	Dinant?	For Elector of Cologne?
Le Réciproque	divertissement		1714 May(c.)	Valenciennes	
Le Triomphe de la Paix	dramatic cantata		1714(c.)		Celebrating Treaty of Rastatt.
La reggia dell'armonia	pasticcio (+Steffani)	Luigi Orlandi	1715 Aug.	Munich	18th birthday of Electoral Prince.
Ismène (=L'innocenza difesa dai Numi)	opera		1715 Oct.?	Munich	
Introduzione a balli	cantata		1715–1716	Munich	
La Baviera	serenata		29 August 1716	Munich	Return of Electoral Prince.
Astianatte	dramma per musica	Antonio Salvi	12 October 1716	Munich	Name day of Elector.
Andromaca (rev. of Astianatte)	dramma per musica	Antonio Salvi	1717 Feb.(c.)	Munich	
Torneo ("Già dall'Iser ameno")	cantata (tourney)		6 May 1718	Leuchtenberg	
Epitalamio	cantata (wedding)		17 February 1719	Munich	Marriage of Ferdinand Maria and Maria Anna.
La Merope	dramma per musica	Apostolo Zeno	12 October 1719	Munich	Name day of Elector.
Eumene (attr.)	dramma per musica	Apostolo Zeno/Antonio Salvi	11 July 1720	Munich	Birthday of Elector.
Lucio Vero (attr.)	dramma per musica	Apostolo Zeno	12 October 1720	Munich	Name day of Elector.
Per l'anniversario della nascità de S. A. E. Massimiliano Emanuele	cantata		17 July 1721	Munich	Birthday of Elector.
Gli dei festeggianti	dramatic cantata		6 August 1721	Munich	Birthday of Electoral Prince.
L'amor d'amico vince ogni altro amore	dramma per musica	Adriano Morselli	12 October 1721	Munich	Name day of Elector.
Adelaide	dramma per musica	Antonio Salvi	18 October 1722	Munich	Marriage of Electoral Prince and Archduchess.
La publica felicità	cantata (tourney)	Pietro Pariati	22 October 1722	Munich	Marriage of Electoral Prince and Archduchess.
Lucio Vero (rev.)	dramma per musica	Apostolo Zeno	3 January 1723	Munich	
Merope (=La Merope)	dramma per musica	Apostolo Zeno	24 January 1723	Munich	Carnival.
Griselda (attr.)	dramma per musica	Apostolo Zeno	12 October 1723	Munich	Name day of Elector.
Amadis di Grecia	dramma per musica	Perozzi	1724 Oct.	Munich	Birth of Princess.
Venceslao (attr.)	dramma per musica	Apostolo Zeno	12 October 1725	Munich	Name day of Elector.
Egloga pastorale	pastorale		6 September 1726		Name day of Electoral Prince.
L'Epaminonda	dramma per musica	Domenico Lalli	11 May 1727	Munich	Birth of Prince.
Nicomede	dramma per musica	Domenico Lalli	1728 Oct.	Munich	Visit of Count Palatine.
Edippo	tragedia per musica	Domenico Lalli	22 October 1729	Munich	Birthday of Electress.
L' Ippolito	tragedia per musica	Domenico Lalli	22 October 1731	Munich	Name day of Electress.
Ciro (attr.)	dramma per musica	Villati	1733	Munich	Visit of Archbishop-Elector.
Griselda (rev.)	dramma per musica	Apostolo Zeno	1735 Feb.(c.)	Munich	Carnival.
Catone in Utica	tragedia per musica	Metastasio	1736	Munich	

=== Sacred music ===
==== Magnificat ====
Torri likely composed his Magnificat in C major for double choir and orchestra in the 1690s. The work is scored for double SATB choir, two trumpets, bassoon, strings (two violin parts and two viola parts) and basso continuo/organ.

The Magnificat in C major, BWV Anh. 30, is Johann Sebastian Bach's arrangement of Torri's Magnificat. In Bach's version of the work there are an additional trumpet and timpani.

==== Masses ====
- Missa pro Defunctis: Requiem mass for the Elector (died in 1726). The composition is for SSATB singers and an orchestra consisting of oboes, strings and continuo (organ).
- Missa solemnis in D major.
- Mass in C major.

==== Oratorios ====
Torri wrote more oratorios than any composer before George Frideric Handel (see also several dramatic oratorios mentioned above among Torri's dramatic works):

- Abelle (Brussels 1692–1701; Munich 1734).
- San Gaetano (Brussels 4 April 1705).
- La vanità del mondo (Brussels 5, 12 and 19 March 1706), libretto by Carlo Francesco Melchiori.
- Giacobbe, also known as Rebecca (Brussels, Mons or Namur 1705–1714).
- Genesio (Brussels, Mons or Namur 1705–1714).
- Elia (Munich, Spring 1730), libretto by Leopoldo di Villati.
- Abramo (Munich, Spring 1731), libretto by Domenico Lalli.
- Gionata (Munich c. 1733), libretto by Apostolo Zeno.

==== Other ====
The Mus.ms. 30299 manuscript of the Berlin State Library not only contains a copy of Torri's Magnificat, but also following sacred music, from the same composer:

- Confitebor.
- Dominus illuminatio mea.
- In caelo stellato.
- In te Domine speravi, performed 31 October 1728 (23rd Sunday after Trinitas).
- Laudate pueri.
- Two different Lauda Jerusalems.
- Laetatus sum.
- Veniat dilectus meus.

=== Chamber music ===
==== Trastulli ====
The Trastulli (trifles) is a collection of 60 short vocal works surviving in a four-volume autograph, written between 1692 and 1701. The first of these volumes contains 14 chamber cantatas, each consisting exclusively of a recitative and a da capo aria. The other volumes contain such arias without recitative. The Trastulli are, at least in part, extracted from larger vocal works:

- The first volume contains 14 Recitative and Aria pairs:
1. Con insoliti fregi (aria: "Non si scorge più dipinto"; S, vdg)
2. Dalle spine da i Numi (aria: "Le rose odorose"; S, b, fl)
3. Non v'è nube importuna (aria: "Di Vulcan nelle prigioni"; B, b, 2fl/2vl)
4. Volano d'ogni intorno (aria: "I molli zeffiretti con le fronde"; S, b, ob)
5. Passan di ramo in ramo (aria: "Dal petto canoro"; S, b, fl/ob)
6. Con dolci melodie (aria: "Ciò che vegeta"; S, b, vdg/ob)
7. Le ninfe più vezzose (aria: "Con placido incanto"; B, b, fl, fld)
8. Le Castalide suore (aria: "Qui soggiorna un vago nume"; S, b, vdg)
9. Bella diva (aria: "Per te sola sorge l'alba"; S, b, vdg/fl)
10. Seguono i tuoi vestigi (aria: "Quante pompe ha la bellezza"; B, b, fl)
11. Del Latio antico e delle Greche scole (aria: "Ben traluce nell'aspetto"; S, b, vdg/ob)
12. Or va con tanta luce (aria: "Due seni più felici"; S, b, vdg/ob)
13. L'opre nostre e i pensieri (aria: "Voi sarete con"; S, b, fl)
14. Vi piova il ciel benigno (aria: "L'aureo stame vital"; S, b, fl)
- The second volume contains 17 arias, ten of which are excerpted from the Briseide dramma per musica:
1. From Briseide act 3 scene 8: "Godi giubila alma mia" (S, ob/vl, b)
2. From Briseide act 1 scene 9: "Vieni o cara amata sposa al mio cor" (S, b, fl, ob)
3. From Briseide act 1 scene 4: "Agitati miei pensieri" (S, b, ob)
4. From Briseide act 2 scene 5: "Onde chiare imparate a non amare" (S, b, fl/vl, ob/vl)
5. From Briseide act 2 scene 2: "Dolce auretta che sì grata" (S, b, fld)
6. From Briseide act 2 scene 10: "Un core o pianti o sassi" (S, b, fld)
7. "Luci serene se per voi moro" (S, b, fld)
8. "Di pastorella oh quanto è bella" (S, b, fl)
9. "Spero sì dagli aspri marmi" (S, b, fl)
10. "Fra gli orrori di notte più ombrosa" (S, b, fl)
11. "Se dar voglio al mio crudo tormento" (S, vl, b)
12. "Vivo in pene e di consiglio non ho speme" (S, b, vdg)
13. From Briseide act 1 scene 7: "Rendetemi al mio ben fati inclementi" (S, b, 2fl)
14. "Cresce il foco a poco" (S, b, vdg)
15. From Briseide act 3 scene 8: "Nel mio fiero penar" (S, b, vdg)
16. From Briseide: "Quando venne nel mio core" (S, b, fl)
17. From Briseide act 1 scene 11: "Hai finito a tanti guai" (S, b, vdg)
- The third volume contains an aria for alto (No. 6), while all other Trastulli are either for soprano or bass:
1. "Son di foco e son di ghiaccio" (S, vl, b)
2. "Il sospiro è una parola" (S, vl, b)
3. "All'or che vezzosa sul prato" (S, b, ob)
4. "Chi non gode di sua lode" (B, vl, b)
5. "Sei menzognera sei lusinghiera" (S, vl, b)
6. "Con tal voce il ciel richiama" (A, b, ob)
7. "Quanto dura omai ti rendi" (B, b, 2vdg)
8. "Il rispetto che mi rende" (S, b, ob)
9. "Già langue il seno e già vien meno" (B, b, 2vdg)
10. "Il pastorello s'en giace afflitto" (S, b, ob)
11. "Lascivoli il mio desio" (B, b, 2vdg; music similar to IV/6)
12. "Sorghin pur tempeste irate" (S, vl, b)
13. "Orror profondo la terra ingombra" (S, 2vl, b)
14. "Si vendicate o dei" (S, vl, b)
15. "Sonno amico de' mortali" (S, 2vl, b)
- The fourth volume contains one aria in French (No. 10), and one without text (No. 12) – all other Trastulli have an Italian text:
1. "Traffitto ho il seno da un guardo ameno" (B, b, 2vdg)
2. "Aurette flebili che qui spirate" (S, b, 2vdg)
3. "Se un guardo girate pupille vezzose" (B, b, 2vdg)
4. "V'amo sì care luci adorate" (S, b, 2vdg)
5. "Ombre amene della notte deh calmate" (A, b, 2vdg)
6. "Deh volate o miei pensieri" (B, b, 2vdg; music similar to III/11)
7. "Deh volgi sereno quel guardo che ameno" (S, b, 2vdg)
8. From S Landelino: "Per dar sfogo al mio crudo" (B, b, 2vdg).
9. "Sei pur cruda a miei tormenti" (B, b, 2vdg)
10. "Triste remous funeste inquiétude" (B, b, 2vdg)
11. "Vuo cercando il mio ristoro" (B, b, 2vdg)
12. Aria without text (B, b, 2vdg)
13. "Come ahi lasso ti perdei" (T, b, 2vdg)
14. "Al languido seno" (S, b, 2vdg)

==== Sonatas ====
- Sonata in C major for alto recorder and continuo.
- Sonata in C major for two violins, viola, cello and continuo, in four movements:
  1. Allegro (3/4)
  2. Presto
  3. Adagio (3/2)
  4. Presto (3/4)
- Sonata in F major for two violins, viola, cello and organ, in three movements:
  1. Allegro
  2. Adagio (3/2)
  3. Presto (6/8)

== Discography ==
- Musik am Hofe des Kurfürsten Max Emanuel von Bayern is a 1970s LP recording (Musica Bavarica MB 904) of the Münchener Kammerorchester conducted by Hans Stadlmair, containing extracts of these works by Torri:
  - Introduzione a balli.
  - Peripezze della Fortuna.
  - Merope.
- Echoes of Love: Eighteenth-Century Italian Cantatas is a 1993 CD containing Torri's V'amo si, care luci, a three-movement cantata, consisting of a recitative preceded and followed by an aria (soprano Lia Serafini and Ensemble Barocco Sans Souci; Dynamic CDS106):
  - "V'amo, si, care luci adorate" (= Trastulli IV/4)
  - "Escon da' vostri rai"
  - "Se, allorche vi miro"
- Six arias of the Trastulli, sung by soprano Tania d'Altann, are included on a CD that was recorded in 1884 and released in 1998 (Arts 47399-2):
  - "Di Pastorella" (II/8; 3:01)
  - "Fra Gli Orrori di Notte" (II/10; 4:27)
  - "Dolce Auretta" (II/5; 4:35)
  - Passan Di Ramo In Ramo (I/5; 5:15)
  - "Un Core, O Piante, O Sassi" (II/6; 3:32)
  - "Sorghin Pur Tempeste Irate" (III/12; 3:21)

The recording combines these arias by Torri with canzonettas from Biagio Marini's Op. 5. The Accademia Claudio Monteverdi is the accompanying orchestra, and Hans Ludwig Hirsch is the conductor on this recording.

- Torri's Missa pro Defunctis is included in Pro defunctis: Liturgy for the death of the baroque area, performed by Paul Dombrecht conducting Il Fondamento, Passacaille 933 (recorded 2000, released 2001).
- La Baviera performed by Christoph Hammer conducting the Neue Hofkapelle München, Ars Produktion 38 001 (recorded 2002, released 2003). Other compositions by Torri contained on this SACD recording:
  - La publica felicità (extracts)
  - Egloga pastorale (extracts)
- Le Triomphe de la Paix performed by Christoph Hammer conducting the Neue Hofkapelle München, ORF CD 424 (2004 live recording, released 2005). Other compositions by Torri contained on this SACD recording:
  - Magnificat à 15 et più;
  - Motet Veniat dilectus meus.
- Le martyre des Maccabées, Musique en Wallonie (2007 live recording, released 2009).
- Some recordings of "Son rosignolo" from L'innocenza difesa dai Numi, a.k.a. Ismène, were released in the 2010s:
  - 2011: performed by Collegium Flauto e Voce (Carus 83.344)
  - 2014 (recorded 2013): sung by Friederike Holzhausen, accompanied by Susanne Ehrhardt (recorder) and Sabine Erdmann (Verlag Klaus-Jurgen Kamprad VKJK 1413)
  - 2015: by Stefan Temmingh (recorder), Dorothee Mields (soprano) and the Gentleman's Band (Deutsche Harmonia Mundi 88875141202)
- La prima diva: Arie per Faustina Bordoni is a 2014 CD (recorded 2013) on with arias composed for Faustina Bordoni, among which "Se amori ascolterò" from Torri's Griselda, sung by Agata Bienkowska accompanied by Barockwerk Hamburg and Ira Hochman (Tactus TC 670003).
- Another aria from Griselda, "Vorresti col tuo pianto", is included in Xavier Sabata's Catharsis album (Armonia Atenea, George Petrou; recorded 2015, released 2017; Aparté Music AP 143).
- Terry Wey's 2017 Pace e guerra: Arias for Bernacchi album (recorded 2016; with Rubén Dubrovsky and the Bach Consort Wien; Deutsche Harmonia Mundi 88985410502) contains a few arias which Torri composed for the castrato singer Antonio Bernacchi:
  - "Pace e guerra" from Lucio Vero (3:19)
  - "La cara tua favella" from Amadis di Grecia (7:04)
  - "Parto, non ho costanza" from Venceslao (10:06)
- La vanità del mondo performed by Reinhard Goebel conducting Barbara Schlick, Ingrid Schmithüsen, Derek Lee Ragin, Michael Schopper and Musica Antiqua Köln, Musique en Wallonie MEW 1890 (recorded 1988, released 2018).
- "Amorosa rondinella" from Nicomede, sung by Nuria Rial, accompanied by Kammerorchester Basel (conductor: Stefano Barneschi) is included in Baroque Twitter, an album recorded in 2017 and released in 2018 (Deutsche Harmonia Mundi 88985497582)
- Recitative ("La sua disperazione") and Aria ("Se a ammollire il crudo amante") from Amadis di Grecia, sung by soprano Mary Bevan accompanied by Bridget Cunningham conducting London Early Opera, is included in Handel’s Queens (Signum SIGCD579, 2019).
- Erato's La vanità del mondo, recorded in June 2020 by Philippe Jaroussky and Ensemble Artaserse, was released in November 2020. The album contains these arias by Torri:
  - Isacco's "Perché più franco" from Abramo
  - Piacere's "Esiliatevi pene funeste" from La vanità del mondo
