= Johann Christoph Pez =

- Born: September 9, 1664; Munich
- Died: September 25, 1716 (aged 52); Stuttgart
- Occupations: Musician, composer, and concert master
- Years active: 1688—1716
- Era: Baroque
- Employer(s): Maximilian II Emanuel, Elector of Bavaria; Eberhard Ludwig, Duke of Württemberg
- Known for: Work in the Württemberg Hofkapelle
- Children: Maria Anne Franziska Pez

Johann Christoph Pez, also Petz, (9 September 1664 – 25 September 1716) was a German Baroque musician, Kapellmeister, and composer who worked in the courts of the Electorate of Bavaria and Duchy of Württemberg.

== Life ==
Pez was born in Munich. From 1676, he was the tower watchman and later the choir director at the Church of Saint Peter in Munich. In 1688, he became a musician at the court of prince Maximilian Emmanuel, Elector of Bavaria who offered him the opportunity to study music under the leading Italian composer Arcangelo Corelli in Rome. In 1694, Pez joined the court of Joseph Clemens, Archbishop-Elector of Cologne at his residence in Bonn, working to improve the prince's chapel orchestra. In 1695, he became Kapellmeister and advisor to the prince. Returning to Munich in 1701, he remained for five years at the court's chapel for five years, before Max Emmanuel sent him to study composition and violin in Rome in the 1690s. He also taught the Wittelsbach children music.

While in Munich, Pez was notice by the Duke of Württemberg, Eberhard Louis in the winter of 1705–06. This meant that when Charles VI, Holy Roman Emperor dismissed the entire Bavarian Hofkapelle by Imperial fiat in May 1706, Pez was able to move straight to the post of Oberkapellmeister of the Württemberg Hofkapelle on 12 November 1706, a post he would hold until his death in 1716. The Duke highly valued Pez's experience and training, and so paid him a generous salary of 2000 gulden that also included pay for work by his daughter, Maria Anne Franziska Pez, and his personal copyist, Antonÿ Meister.

Under Pez, the size of the Hofkapelle expanded, as did the range of instruments used and the number of musicians who could play more than one instrument. Because of the Duchy's financial problems due to the War of the Spanish Succession and the ongoing construction of Ludwigsburg Palace, the court retrenched, the singers and instrumentalists of the Hofkapelle reduced in number and Pez's salary lowered to 500 gulden. Even so, he was able to build a very skilled orchestra of which he was quite proud. Nevertheless, Pez was, very worried about his small number of vocalists, the Catholic singers sometimes missing some church performances, though he never mentioned this to the Duke).

Eberhard Louis and his court were Protestant but tolerated Pez's Catholic faith That faith also meant he was not required to provide housing for some of the court's choir boys (German: Kapellknaben) despite being their supervisor, leading to such a decline in their influence that by 1715 only two were still employed in the Hofkapelle.

== Work ==
Like many of his contemporaries, Pez was heavily influenced by the French style, and he was one of many imitators of Jean-Baptiste Lully.

Although largely forgotten today, Pez was mentioned in a lyric poem written by Georg Philipp Telemann in 1725, who placed him beside the names of composers like Händel, as a grand composer of his era, singling out in particular the quality of his sonatas.

== Selected discography ==
- Ouvertures - Concerti. Les Muffatti & Peter Van Heyghen. (Ramée RAM 0705)
- 12 Trio Sonatas Op 1. L'arpa festante & Christoph Hasse. (CPO 555 392-2)
