= Tilge, Höchster, meine Sünden, BWV 1083 =

Johann Sebastian Bach's adaptation of Pergolesi's Stabat Mater

Tilge, Höchster, meine Sünden
- BWV 1083
- Psalm cantata by J. S. Bach
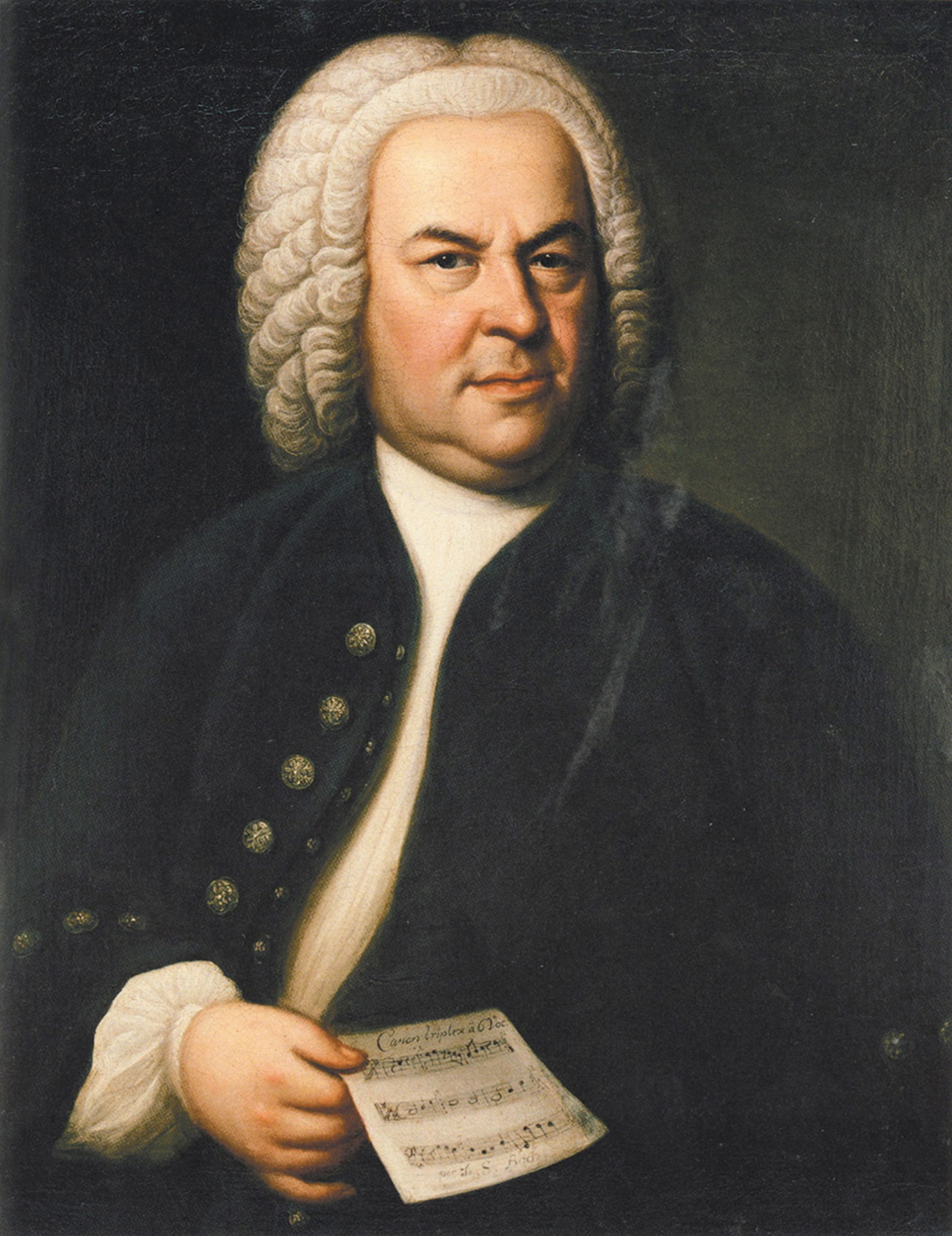
- 1748 portrait of Bach
- English: Cancel, Highest, my sins
- Related: based on Pergolesi's 1736 Stabat Mater
- Bible text: paraphrase of Psalm 51
- Performed: 1740s
- Published: 1962
- Movements: 14
- Vocal: solo: soprano, alto; optional SA choir
- Instrumental: 2 solo violins; 2 violins; viola; violone; cello; continuo

Tilge, Höchster, meine Sünden (Cancel, Highest, my sins, or: Lord, annul all my transgressions), BWV 1083, is a sacred vocal composition by Johann Sebastian Bach. It is an arrangement that Bach made in the 1740s of Pergolesi's Stabat Mater from 1736, slightly expanding the orchestral material. He used a German paraphrase of Psalm 51 as text for his composition. While Bach named the work a Motetto in the autograph, it is rather a psalm cantata, scored for soprano and alto voices, strings and basso continuo. Some of the 14 movements have become traditionally sung by a two-part choir. The work was first published by Hänssler in 1962, and in a critical edition, based on Bach's performance material found only later, by Carus-Verlag in 1989. The work is interesting to scholars as an example how Bach edited music from a different tradition.

== History and text ==
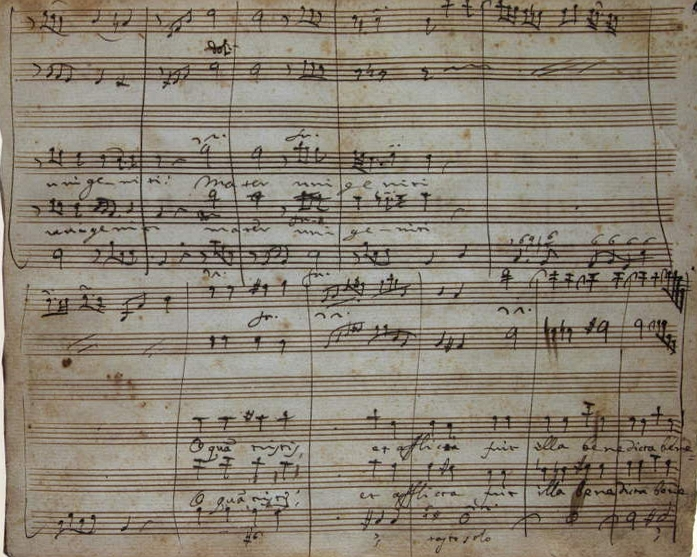
Autograph from the third movement of Pergolesi's Stabat Mater

Tilge, Höchster, meine Sünden is a musical parody of the Stabat Mater which Pergolesi had composed in 1736. This setting was successful from the beginning, performed all over Europe and arranged frequently, for example by Johann Adam Hiller as a Passion cantata in 1774 to a translation of the original text by Klopstock.

Bach used a different text, a German paraphrase of the penitential Psalm 51 by an unknown author. The incipit translates as "Cancel, Highest, my sins". Bach wrote his version in the 1740s, slightly expanding the orchestral material. He named it a Motetto (motet) in the header of his manuscript. It is a psalm cantata without assignment to a specific liturgical occasion.

Bach's version was made c. 1745/1747. A first performance in 1746–1747 in Leipzig has been assumed. Bach's performance of Tilge, Höchster, meine Sünden, before Pergolesi's work was printed for the first time in 1748, is the earliest demonstrable performance of this music by Pergolesi in Germany.

== Structure ==
Bach structured the 20 stanzas of the poetry in 14 movements:

1. Tilge, Höchster, meine Sünden (Lord, annul all my transgressions – stanza 1)
2. Ist mein Herz in Missetaten (When my heart is filled with evil – stanza 2)
3. Missetaten, die mich drücken (My transgressions still are weighing – stanza 3)
4. Dich erzürnt mein Tun und Lassen (You despise my deeds and acting – stanza 4)
5. Wer wird seine Schuld verneinen (Who denies his guilt and sinning – stanzas 5, 6)
6. Siehe! ich bin in Sünd empfangen (See, we are in sin conceiving – stanza 7)
7. Sieh, du willst die Wahrheit haben (Yes, you want a truthful freedom – stanza 8)
8. Wasche mich doch rein von Sünden (Wash me, make me pure from sinning – stanza 9)
9. Lass mich Freud und Wonne spüren (Let your joy and bliss surround me – stanza 10)
10. Schaue nicht auf meine Sünden (Do not look on my transgressions – stanzas 11 to 15)
11. Öffne Lippen, Mund und Seele (Open lips and mouth and spirit – stanza 16)
12. Denn du willst kein Opfer haben (For you want no off'ring given – stanzas 17, 18)
13. Lass dein Zion blühend dauern (Let your Zion blossom ever – stanzas 19, 20)
14. Amen.

== Scoring and music ==
The performance material of Bach's version has parts for voices and instruments, indicated as for Soprano, Alto, Violino Primo, Violino Primo Ripieno, Violino Secondo, Violino Secondo Ripieno, Viola, Violon, Cembalo, Organo. It means soprano and alto voices, two concertante violin parts, two ripieno violin parts, viola, violone, cello using the same music as the violone, and figured parts for both harpsichord and organ. It is unclear if harpsichord or organ would be used depending on a performance place, or both together as was also common practise at the time.

Bach wrote ornamentation and melismas for the voices to express the German text better. The moods and "conceptual traits" of the two texts are similar, but Bach moved Pergolesi's two movement preceding the Amen to an earlier position, having to abandon the key sequence in the process.

Bach's orchestration is richer than Pergolesi's original. Where in Pergolesi's version the viola often plays in unison with the continuo, Bach increases the independence of this instrument, thus creating the four-part harmony typical of his own style.

While most vocal movements are accompanied only by solo instruments (violins, viola and cello), Bach uses all instruments for the movements set in counterpoint, Nos. 9 and 14. This justifies to have a choir sing these movements. Editor Hellmann noted that the opening movement and No 6. might be performed in the same style.

In the Amen fugue, Bach first uses Pergolesi's setting in F minor, but repeats it for a conclusion in F major.

== Movements ==
The following table provides for the 14 movements the beginning of the text, the voices involved (S = soprano, A = alto), the marking, key and tempo, following the Carus score:

No.	Text	Voices	Marking	Key	Tempo
1	Tilge, Höchster, meine Sünden	S A	Largo	F minor	common time
2	Ist mein Herz in Missetaten	S	Andante	C minor	3/8
3	Missetaten, die mich drücken	S A	Larghetto	G minor	common time
4	Dich erzürnt mein Tun und Lassen	A	Andante	E♭ major	2/4
5	Wer wird seine Schuld verneinen	S A	Largo	C minor	common time
6	Siehe! ich bin in Sünd empfangen	S A		C minor	6/8
7	Sieh, du willst die Wahrheit haben	S		F minor	common time
8	Wasche mich doch rein von Sünden	A		C minor	3/8
9	Lass mich Freud und Wonne spüren	S A	Allabreve	G minor	cut time
10	Schaue nicht auf meine Sünden	S A	Andante	E♭ major	common time
11	Öffne Lippen, Mund und Seele	A	Adagio spirituoso	G minor	common time
12	Denn du willst kein Opfer haben	S A	Largo	F minor	common time
13	Lass dein Zion blühend dauern	S A	Allegro (Vivace)	B♭ major	common time
14	Amen.	S A	Allabreve	F minor	cut time

== Publication ==
A short score in Bach's autograph is held by the Berlin State Library. A set of parts for voices and instruments, missing a title page, was later found in the same library, written by Johann Christoph Altnickol, with some amendments by Bach.

The composition was forgotten, and probably first mentioned in a letter by organist Karl Straube to Hans-Georg Gadamer in 1946. Critical research followed 15 years later. As only a short manuscript was known then, it was assumed that Bach performed the work from the Pergolesi's original material, and a first publication by Hänssler in 1962 was based on this premise. However, Bach's performance material was found by Alfred Dürr a few years later, and a critical edition based on it was published by Carus-Verlag in 1989, edited by Diethard Hellmann. It was revised in 2017.

== Recordings ==
Recordings of Tilge, Höchster, meine Sünden include:

- Ursula Buckel, Margrit Conrad, Bach-Chor and orchestra, Hellmann, Bach-Kantaten, vol 7 (1966)
- Benita Valente, Judith Malafronte, American Bach Soloists, Jeffrey Thomas. J. S. Bach: Transcriptions of Italian Music. Koch International, 1993.
- St. Florianer Sängerknaben (also soloists), Ars Antiqua Austria, Gunar Letzbor. J. S. Bach: Violin Concertos BWV 1041-1043; Psalm 51 BWV 1083 after Pergolesi‘s Stabat Mater. Pan Classics, 1995.
- Monika Frimmer, Kai Wessel, Neue Hofkapelle München, Christian Brembeck. Bach & die Italiener. Christophorus, 1996.
- Maya Boog, Michael Chance, Balthasar-Neumann Ensemble, Thomas Hengelbrock. Scarlatti · Bach · Durante. Deutsche Harmonia Mundi, 1998.
- Christiane Oelze, Birgit Remmert, Gächinger Kantorei / Bach-Collegium Stuttgart, Helmuth Rilling. Edition Bachakademie Vol. 73. Hänssler, 1999.
- Marjon Strijk, Sytse Buwalda, Netherlands Bach Collegium, Pieter Jan Leusink. Bach Edition Vol. 17. Brilliant Classics, 2000.
- Karina Gauvin, Daniel Taylor, Les Violons du Roy, Bernard Labadie. Bach: Psaume 51 d’après le Stabat Mater de Pergolesi; Cantate BWV 82 "Ich habe genug". ATMA, 2004.
- Emma Kirkby, Daniel Taylor, Theatre of Early Music, Taylor. Stabat Mater. BIS, 2006.
- Carolyn Sampson, Robin Blaze, Bach Collegium Japan, Masaaki Suzuki. J. S. Bach: Secular Cantatas Vol. 6 (Trauerode). BIS-2181 SACD/CD, 2015
- Céline Scheen, Damien Guillon, Le Banquet Céleste, Guillon. J. S. Bach: Psalm 51 BWV 1083 (after Pergolesi's Stabat Mater). Glossa, GCD 923701, 2016.

== Sources ==
- Hellmann, Diethard, ed. (1989). Tilge, Höchster, meine Sünden / Psalm 51 / nach dem "Stabat Mater" von / based on the "Stabat Mater" by / Giovanni Battista Pergolesi / BWV 1083 (PDF). Carus-Verlag. pp. 7–10.
- Platen, Emil (1961). "Eine Pergolesi-Bearbeitung Bachs" [An arrangement of Pergolesi by Bach]. In Dürr, Alfred; Neumann, Werner (eds.). Bach-Jahrbuch 1961 [Bach Yearbook 1961]. Bach-Jahrbuch (in German). Vol. 48. Berlin: Evangelische Verlagsanstalt (published 1962). pp. 35–51. doi:10.13141/bjb.v1961. Digital version at Qucosa.
- "Johann Sebastian Bach Tilge, Höchster, meine Sünden". Carus-Verlag. 1961.
