= Nun freut euch, lieben Christen g'mein =

1523 Lutheran hymn

- Hymn by Martin Luther
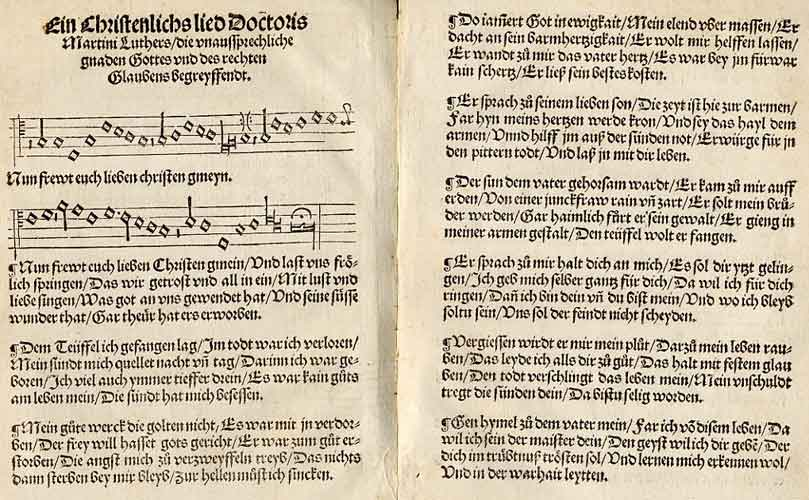
- Print in the Erfurt Enchiridion, 1524
- Catalogue: Zahn 4427–4429a
- Text: by Martin Luther
- Language: German
- Published: 1524

"Nun freut euch, lieben Christen g'mein", or “Dear Christians, One and All, Rejoice” in English, is a Lutheran hymn, written in 1523 by Martin Luther. It is one of Luther's early hymns and considered by some as one of his finest. It was published as one of eight songs in 1524 in the first Lutheran hymnal, the Achtliederbuch. The Achtliederbuch contained four songs by Luther, three by Speratus, and one by Justus Jonas. It appeared also in 1524 in the Erfurt Enchiridion.

Apart from the hymn tunes with which it appeared in the Achtliederbuch (Zahn No. 4427) and in the Erfurt Enchiridion (Zahn No. 4428), a third melody, Zahn No. 4429a, was published for the hymn in 1535. Johann Sebastian Bach used both the first and the last of these melodies in his compositions.

The tune is an adaption of the old German folk-song "So weiss ich eins, dass mich erfreut, das pluemlein auff preiter heyde", registered as No. 635 in Franz Magnus Böhme's "Altdeutsches Liederbuch".

== Text ==
1. Nun freut euch, lieben Christen g’mein,
und lasst uns fröhlich springen,
dass wir getrost und all in ein
mit Lust und Liebe singen,
was Gott an uns gewendet hat
und seine süße Wundertat;
gar teu’r hat er’s erworben.

2. Dem Teufel ich gefangen lag,
im Tod war ich verloren,
mein Sünd mich quälte Nacht und Tag,
darin ich war geboren.
Ich fiel auch immer tiefer drein,
es war kein Guts am Leben mein,
die Sünd hatt’ mich besessen.

3. Mein guten Werk, die galten nicht,
es war mit ihn’ verdorben;
der frei Will hasste Gotts Gericht,
er war zum Gutn erstorben;
die Angst mich zu verzweifeln trieb,
dass nichts denn Sterben bei mir blieb,
zur Höllen musst ich sinken.

4. Da jammert Gott in Ewigkeit
mein Elend übermaßen;
er dacht an sein Barmherzigkeit,
er wollt mir helfen lassen;
er wandt zu mir das Vaterherz,
es war bei ihm fürwahr kein Scherz,
er ließ’s sein Bestes kosten.

5. Er sprach zu seinem lieben Sohn:
„Die Zeit ist hier zu erbarmen;
fahr hin, meins Herzens werte Kron,
und sei das Heil dem Armen
und hilf ihm aus der Sünden Not,
erwürg für ihn den bittern Tod
und lass ihn mit dir leben.“

6. Der Sohn dem Vater g’horsam ward,
er kam zu mir auf Erden
von einer Jungfrau rein und zart;
er sollt mein Bruder werden.
Gar heimlich führt er sein Gewalt,
er ging in meiner armen G’stalt,
den Teufel wollt er fangen.

7. Er sprach zu mir: „Halt dich an mich,
es soll dir jetzt gelingen;
ich geb mich selber ganz für dich,
da will ich für dich ringen;
denn ich bin dein und du bist mein,
und wo ich bleib, da sollst du sein,
uns soll der Feind nicht scheiden.

8. Vergießen wird er mir mein Blut,
dazu mein Leben rauben;
das leid ich alles dir zugut,
das halt mit festem Glauben.
Den Tod verschlingt das Leben mein,
mein Unschuld trägt die Sünde dein,
da bist du selig worden.

9. Gen Himmel zu dem Vater mein
fahr ich von diesem Leben;
da will ich sein der Meister dein,
den Geist will ich dir geben,
der dich in Trübnis trösten soll
und lehren mich erkennen wohl
und in der Wahrheit leiten.

10. Was ich getan hab und gelehrt,
das sollst du tun und lehren,
damit das Reich Gotts werd gemehrt
zu Lob und seinen Ehren;
und hüt dich vor der Menschen Satz,
davon verdirbt der edle Schatz:
das lass ich dir zur Letze.“

== See also ==
- List of hymns by Martin Luther

== Sources ==
- Zahn, Johannes (1890). Die Melodien der deutschen evangelischen Kirchenlieder. Vol. III. Gütersloh: Bertelsmann. pp. 69–70.
