= St John Passion =

1724 musical composition by Johann Sebastian Bach

- BWV 245
- Passion by J. S. Bach
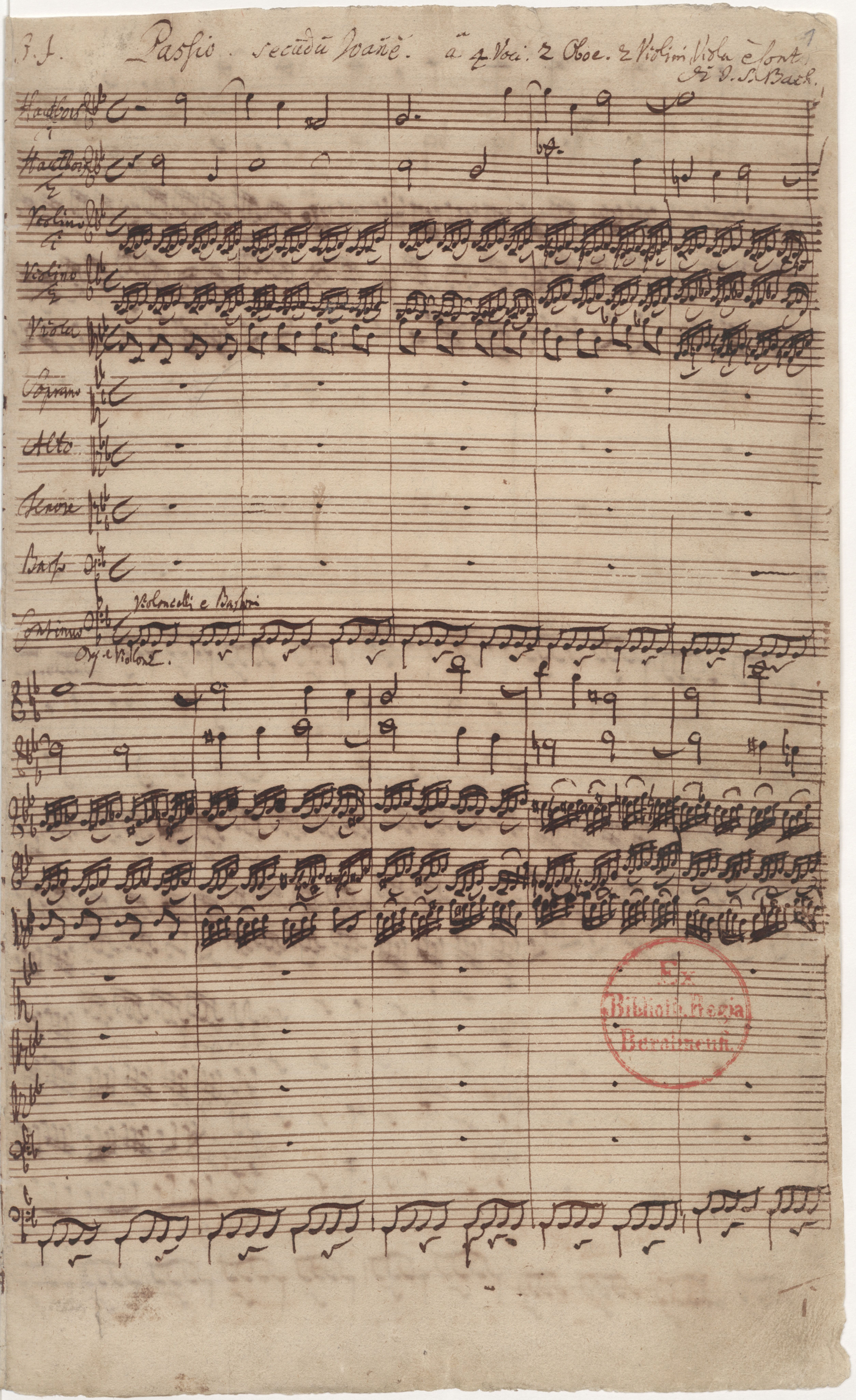
- First page of the autograph
- Native name: Passio secundum Joannem
- Occasion: Good Friday
- Text: John 18–19; madrigal poetry; chorales
- Performed: 7 April 1724: Leipzig (version 1); 30 March 1725: Leipzig (version 2); 1728/1730?: Leipzig (version 3); 1739/1749?: Leipzig (version 4)
- Scoring: SATB choir and solo; orchestra of woodwinds, strings and basso contiuo

The Passio secundum Joannem or St John Passion (Note: Bach's Latin title is more literally "Passion according to John".) (German: Johannes-Passion), BWV 245, is a Passion or oratorio by Johann Sebastian Bach, the earliest of the surviving Passions by Bach. It was written during his first year as director of church music in Leipzig and was first performed on 7 April 1724, at Good Friday Vespers at the St. Nicholas Church.

The structure of the work falls in two halves, intended to flank a sermon. The anonymous libretto draws on existing works (notably by Barthold Heinrich Brockes) and is compiled from recitatives and choruses narrating the Passion of Christ as told in the Gospel of John, ariosos and arias reflecting on the action, and chorales using hymn tunes and texts familiar to a congregation of Bach's contemporaries. Compared with the St Matthew Passion, the St John Passion has been described as more extravagant, with an expressive immediacy, at times more unbridled and less "finished".

The work is most often heard today in the 1739–1749 version (never performed during Bach's lifetime). Bach first performed the oratorio in 1724 and revised it in 1725, 1730, and 1749, adding several numbers. "O Mensch, bewein dein Sünde groß", a 1725 replacement for the opening chorus, found a new home in the 1736 St Matthew Passion but several arias from the revisions are found only in the appendices to modern editions.

== First performance ==
The St John Passion was intended for the vesper service on Good Friday of 1724, shortly after Bach's 39th birthday. It was originally planned to be held at St. Thomas in Leipzig, but due to a last-minute change by the music council, it was to be first performed at St. Nicholas. Bach quickly agreed to the move,

but pointed out that the booklet was already printed, that there was no room available and that the harpsichord needed some repair, all of which, however, could be attended to at little cost; but he requested that a little additional room be provided in the choir loft of St. Nicholas Church, where he planned to place the musicians needed to perform the music. He also asked that the harpsichord be repaired.

The council agreed and sent a flyer announcing the new location to all the people around Leipzig. The council made the arrangements requested by Bach regarding the harpsichord and space needed for the choir.

== Musical architecture and sources ==
The St John Passion is written for a four-part choir with soloists, as well as an instrumental ensemble of strings and basso continuo with pairs of flauti traversi and oboes, the latter both doubling on oboe da caccia. For special colors Bach also used viola d'amore and viola da gamba, instruments that were already considered old-fashioned at the time.

In present-day performances the part of Jesus is often given to one bass soloist, Pilate and the bass arias to another. The part of the Evangelist and the tenor arias are often given to two different singers. The smaller parts (Peter, Maid, Servant) are usually performed by choir members.

Bach followed chapters 18 and 19 of the Gospel of John in the Luther Bible, and the tenor Evangelist follows exactly the words of that bible. The compiler of the additional poetry is unknown. Models are the Brockes Passion and a Johannes-Passion by Christian Heinrich Postel. The first scene is in the Kidron Valley, and the second in the palace of the high priest Kaiphas. Part Two shows three scenes, one with Pontius Pilate, one at Golgatha, and the third finally at the burial site. The dramatic argument between Pilate, Jesus, and the crowd is not interrupted by reflective elements but a single central chorale.

The numbering of the movements is different in different editions. The following table uses the numbers of the Neue Bach-Ausgabe (NBA).

Part One
NBA	Voices	German	English
1	Coro	Herr, unser Herrscher, dessen Ruhm in allen Landen herrlich ist	Lord, our Lord, whose glory is magnificent in all the earth
2a	Evangelist, Jesus	Jesus ging mit seinen Jüngern über den Bach Kidron	Jesus went forth with his disciples over the brook Cedron
2b	Coro	Jesum von Nazareth	Jesus of Nazareth
2c	Evangelist, Jesus	Jesus spricht zu ihnen	Jesus says to them
2d	Coro	Jesum von Nazareth	Jesus of Nazareth
2e	Evangelist, Jesus	Jesus antwortete: Ich hab's euch gesagt, daß ich's sei	Jesus answered, I have told you that I am
3	Chorale	O große Lieb', o Lieb' ohn' alle Maße	O great love, o love beyond all measure
4	Evangelist, Jesus	Auf daß das Wort erfüllet würde	That the saying might be fulfilled
5	Chorale	Dein Will' gescheh', Herr Gott, zugleich	Thy will be done, Lord God, at the same time
6	Evangelist	Die Schar aber und der Oberhauptmann	Then the band and the captain
7	Aria (alto)	Von den Stricken meiner Sünden	From the bonds of my sins
8	Evangelist	Simon Petrus aber folgete Jesu nach	And Simon Peter followed Jesus
9	Aria (soprano)	Ich folge dir gleichfalls mit freudigen Schritten	I will follow you likewise with joyful steps
10	Evangelist, Maid, Peter, Jesus, Servant	Derselbige Jünger war dem Hohenpriester bekannt	That disciple was known to the high priest
11	Chorale	Wer hat dich so geschlagen	Who hit you so
12a	Evangelist	Und Hannas sandte ihn gebunden zu dem Hohenpriester Kaiphas	Now Annas had sent him bound unto Caiaphas the high priest
12b	Coro	Bist du nicht seiner Jünger einer?	Are you not one of his disciples?
12c	Evangelist, Peter, Servant	Er leugnete aber	He denied it
13	Aria (tenor)	Ach, mein Sinn	Oh, my sense
14	Chorale	Petrus, der nicht denkt zurück	Peter, who does not think back

Part Two
NBA	Voices	German	English
15	Chorale	Christus, der uns selig macht	Christ, who makes us blessed
16a	Evangelist, Pilate	Da führeten sie Jesum von Kaiphas vor das Richthaus	Then led they Jesus from Caiaphas into the hall of judgment
16b	Coro	Wäre dieser nicht ein Übeltäter, wir hätten dir ihn nicht überantwortet.	If he were not a malefactor, we would not have delivered him to you.
16c	Evangelist, Pilate	Da sprach Pilatus zu ihnen	Then said Pilate to them
16d	Coro	Wir dürfen niemand töten.	We must not put any man to death.
16e	Evangelist, Pilate, Jesus	Auf daß erfüllet würde das Wort Jesu	That the saying of Jesus might be fulfilled
17	Chorale	Ach großer König, groß zu allen Zeiten	Oh great king, great at all times
18a	Evangelist, Pilate, Jesus	Da sprach Pilatus zu ihm	Pilate therefore said to him
18b	Coro	Nicht diesen, sondern Barrabam!	Not this man, but Barabbas!
18c	Evangelist, Pilate, Jesus	Barrabas aber war ein Mörder.	Now Barabbas was a murderer.
19	Arioso (bass)	Betrachte, meine Seel', mit ängstlichem Vergnügen	Look, my soul, with anxious pleasure
20	Aria (tenor)	Erwäge, wie sein blutgefärbter Rücken	Consider how his blood-stained back
21a	Evangelist	Und die Kriegsknechte flochten eine Krone von Dornen	And the soldiers plaited a crown of thorns
21b	Coro	Sei gegrüßet, lieber Judenkönig!	Hail, King of the Jews!
21c	Evangelist, Pilate	Und gaben ihm Backenstreiche.	And they smote him with their hands.
21d	Coro	Kreuzige, kreuzige!	Crucify him, crucify him!
21e	Evangelist, Pilate	Pilatus sprach zu ihnen	Pilate said to them
21f	Coro	Wir haben ein Gesetz, und nach dem Gesetz soll er sterben	We have a law, and by our law he ought to die
21g	Evangelist, Pilate, Jesus	Da Pilatus das Wort hörete, fürchtet' er sich noch mehr	When Pilate heard that saying, he was the more afraid
22	Chorale	Durch dein Gefängnis, Gottes Sohn, muß uns die Freiheit kommen	Through thy captivity, Son of God, has come to us the freedom
23a	Evangelist	Die Juden aber schrieen	But the Jews cried out, and said
23b	Coro	Lässest du diesen los, so bist du des Kaisers Freund nicht	If you let this man go, you are not Caesar's friend
23c	Evangelist, Pilate	Da Pilatus das Wort hörete, führete er Jesum heraus	When Pilate heard that saying, he brought Jesus forth
23d	Coro	Weg, weg mit dem, kreuzige ihn!	Away, away with him, crucify him!
23e	Evangelist, Pilate	Spricht Pilatus zu ihnen	Pilate says to them
23f	Coro	Wir haben keinen König denn den Kaiser.	We have no king but Caesar.
23g	Evangelist	Da überantwortete er ihn daß er gekreuziget würde.	Then he delivered him to them to be crucified.
24	Aria (bass)	Eilt, ihr angefochtnen Seelen	Hurry, you souls
25a	Evangelist	Allda kreuzigten sie ihn	There they crucified him
25b	Coro	Schreibe nicht: der Juden König	Write not, The King of the Jews
25c	Evangelist, Pilate	Pilatus antwortet'	Pilate answered
26	Chorale	In meines Herzens Grunde	In the bottom of my heart
27a	Evangelist	Die Kriegsknechte aber, da sie Jesum gekreuziget hatten, nahmen seine Kleider	Then the soldiers, when they had crucified Jesus, took his garments
27b	Coro	Lasset uns den nicht zerteilen, sondern darum losen, wes er sein soll.	Let us not rend it, but cast lots for it, whose it shall be.
27c	Evangelist, Jesus	Auf daß erfüllet würde die Schrift	That the scripture might be fulfilled
28	Chorale	Er nahm alles wohl in acht	He was careful of everything
29	Evangelist, Jesus	Und von Stund' an nahm sie der Jünger zu sich.	And from that hour that disciple took her to his own home.
30	Aria (alto)	Es ist vollbracht!	It is finished!
31	Evangelist	Und neiget' das Haupt und verschied.	He bowed his head, and departed.
32	Aria (bass)	Mein teurer Heiland, laß dich fragen	My precious Savior, let ask you
33	Evangelist	Und siehe da, der Vorhang im Tempel zerriß in zwei Stück	And, behold, the veil of the temple was torn in two
34	Arioso (tenor)	Mein Herz, in dem die ganze Welt bei Jesu Leiden gleichfalls leidet	My heart, in which the whole world in Jesus' suffering likewise suffers
35	Aria (soprano)	Zerfließe, mein Herze, in Fluten der Zähren	Melt, my heart, in floods of tears
36	Evangelist	Die Juden aber, dieweil es der Rüsttag war	The Jews therefore, because it was the preparation day
37	Chorale	O hilf, Christe, Gottes Sohn	O help, Christ, Son of God
38	Evangelist	Darnach bat Pilatum Joseph von Arimathia	And after this Joseph of Arimathea asked Pilate
39	Coro	Ruht wohl, ihr heiligen Gebeine	Rest well, holy bones
40	Chorale	Ach Herr, lass dein' lieb' Engelein	O Lord, let your dear little angels

Bach followed the Gospel of John but added two lines from the Gospel of Matthew, the account of Peter's weeping and the rending of the veil in the temple (in Version I, this second line was replaced by the line from the Gospel of Mark).

He chose the chorales:

- "Herzliebster Jesu, was hast du verbrochen" by Johann Heermann (1630), verse 6 for movement 3, verses 7 & 8 for 17,
- "Vater unser im Himmelreich" by Martin Luther (1539), verse 4 for movement 5,
- "O Welt, sieh hier dein Leben" by Paul Gerhardt (1647), verses 3 & 4 for movement 11,
- "Jesu Leiden, Pein und Tod" by Paul Stockmann (1633), verse 10 for movement 14, verse 20 for 28, the last verse for 32,
- "Christus, der uns selig macht" by Michael Weiße (1531), verse 1 for movement 15, verse 8 for 37,
- "Valet will ich dir geben" by Valerius Herberger (1613), verse 3 for movement 26,
- "Herzlich lieb hab ich dich, o Herr" by Martin Schalling (1571), verse 3 for movement 40.

For the words of the aria "Ach, mein Sinn" (#13), Bach used an adaptation of a 1675 poem by Christian Weise, "Der weinende Petrus".

For the central chorale (#22) "Durch dein Gefängnis, Gottes Sohn, muß uns die Freiheit kommen" ("Through Your prison, Son of God, must freedom come to us) Bach adapted the words of an aria from the Johannes-Passion of Christian Heinrich Postel (1700) and used the melody of "Mach's mit mir, Gott, nach deiner Güt" by Johann Hermann Schein. The architecture of Part Two shows symmetry around this movement, the music of the preceding chorus #21f "Wir haben ein Gesetz" corresponds to #23b "Lässest du diesen los", the demand #21d "Kreuzige ihn!" is repeated in an intensified way in #23d "Weg, weg mit dem, kreuzige ihn!", #21b "Sei gegrüßet, lieber Judenkönig" reappears as #25b "Schreibe nicht: der Juden König".

== Versions ==
Researchers have discovered that Bach revised his St John Passion several times before producing a final version in the 1740s. Alternate numbers that Bach introduced in 1725 but later removed can be found in the appendix to scores of the work, such as that of the Neue Bach-Ausgabe (and heard in the recording by Emmanuel Music directed by Craig Smith, cited below).

The St John Passion was not Bach's first passion. While he was working as Konzertmeister (1714–1717) in Weimar, Bach possibly wrote a Passion, known as the Weimarer Passion, but it is now lost. Sometimes while listening to the St John Passion today one can sense an older feel to some of the music, and some scholars believe that those portions are the surviving parts of the Weimar Passion. Unlike the St Matthew Passion, to which Bach made very few and insignificant changes, the St John Passion was subject to several major revisions. The version most familiar to us today is not the original version from 1724, but rather the version of 1739–1749. In the 1724 version, the Recitative Movement No. 33 reads "Und die Vorhang im Tempel zerriß in zwei Stück; von oben an bis unten aus." (Mark 15, 33) and was in 3 measures. From 1725 on, this was replaced by the more familiar 7-measure quote from Matthew 27: 51–52 (except in the 3rd version, in which this was taken out altogether).

In 1725, Bach replaced the opening and closing choruses and added three arias (BWV 245a-c) while cutting one (Ach, mein Sinn) from the original version. The opening chorus was replaced by O Mensch, bewein dein Sünde groß, which was later transposed and reused at the end of part one of the St Matthew Passion. The closing chorale was replaced by a brilliant setting of "Christe, du Lamm Gottes", taken from the cantata Du wahrer Gott und Davids Sohn, BWV 23. The three new arias are not known to have been reused.

In the 1730s, Bach revised the St John Passion again, restoring the original opening chorus, removing the final Chorale (thus ending the work with the choral Movement No. 39), and removing the three new arias. He also excised the two interpolations from the Gospel of Matthew that appeared in the work, probably due to objections by the ecclesiastical authorities. The first of these he simply removed; he composed a new instrumental sinfonia in lieu of the second. He also inserted an aria to replace the still-missing Ach, mein Sinn. Neither the aria nor the sinfonia has been preserved. Overall, Bach chose to keep the biblical text, and inserted Lutheran hymn verses so that he could return the work to its liturgical substance.

In 1749, he reverted more or less to the original of 1724, making only slight changes to the orchestration, most notably replacing the by-then almost obsolete viola d'amore with muted violins. Also, Bach's orchestra for this piece would have been very delicate in nature because he called for many gamba strings.

In the summer of 1815, Bach's Passions began to be studied once again. Parts of the St John Passion were being rehearsed and the St Matthew Passion was soon to follow. Fred Wolle, with his Choral Union of 1888 at the Moravian town of Bethlehem, Pennsylvania, was the first to perform the St John Passion in the Americas. This spurred a revival of Bach's choral music in the New World.

== Congregational use ==
While writing the St John Passion, Bach intended to retain the congregational spirit of the worship service. The text for the body of the work is taken from the Gospel of John chapters 18 and 19. To augment these chapters, which he summarized in the music, Bach used an elaborate body of commentary consisting of hymns, which were often called chorales, and arias. He adhered to Martin Luther's translation of the Bible and made no noticeable modifications. Bach proved that the sacred opera as a musical genre did not have to become shallow in liturgical use by remaining loyal to the cantus firmus and the scriptural word. He did not want the Passion taken as a lesser sacred concert. The text for the opening prayer, "Herr, unser Herrscher, dessen Ruhm", as well as the arias, chorales and the penultimate chorus "Ruht wohl, ihr heiligen Gebeine", come from various other sources. Two recitative passages, the first dealing with Peter's weeping after his betrayal and the second portraying the temple veil's ripping during the crucifixion, do not appear in the Gospel of John, but the Gospel of Matthew.

A modern example originating in Communist Hungary demonstrates the congregational character of St John Passion. In the early 1950s musicians were allowed to play church music only in the frame of liturgy. However, the St John Passion is an almost complete Lutheran liturgy, focused on the Evangelium. Hence, by inserting four missing features, the whole Passion could be performed as if it were part of the liturgy. (Note: These missing features are, in order: 1. Before the beginning of the service, "In the name of the Father, the Son and the Holy Spirit.", announced by the priest; this is the start of a Lutheran liturgy.; 2. Between the first and second part of the Passion, the priest gives a very short sermon, intended to be understood even by non-believers.; 3. The congregation prays the Pater noster together, after Jesus' death "Und neiget das Haupt und verschied" and before the aria-chorale "Mein teurer Heiland, lass dich fragen".; 4. At the end, the blessing is given by the priest: "The LORD bless you, and keep you; the LORD make His face shine on you, and be gracious to you; the LORD lift up His countenance on you, and give you peace." (Numbers 6:24–26).) There would have been no applause, either at the beginning or at the end. The Passion contains quite a few chorales that were in regular use in worship. The congregation and the audience, however, remained silent.

More recently, the tradition of including the St John Passion in a full-scale Good Friday service was revived in Kokkola, Finland in 2023 (in Swedish) and 2025 (in Finnish).

== Highlights ==
Es ist vollbracht: Alto enters after these first few bars of Viola da gamba solo. Continuo omitted
- Opening chorus: "Herr, unser Herrscher ..." ("Lord, our master, ..."). There is an orchestral intonation of 36 bars before the explosive entrance of the chorus. Each of these bars is a single stress of lower tones, weakening till the end of the bar. These bass beats are accompanied by the remaining instruments of higher tones, by legato singing the prospective theme. The last six bars of the orchestral intro produce a robust crescendo, ending with the loud shouts of "Herr, Herr, Herr!" in the first bars of the chorus. Soon, after the first part of the theme, comes the triple shout again, but this time, at the end of the bars, as a contra answer for the corresponding orchestral deep stresses at the beginning of the bars. Finally, the entire A section is repeated.
  "Herr, unser Herrscher" and "O Mensch, bewein dein Sünde groß" are very different in character. The latter is full of torment in its text, but a serenely majestic piece of music. "Herr, unser Herrscher" sounds as if it has chains of dissonance between the two oboes and the turmoil of the roiling sixteenth notes in the strings. The music grows full of anguish especially when the strings invade the bass, and it therefore characterizes the St John Passion.
- Commenting arias: The first part of the St John Passion includes three commenting arias. There is an alto aria, "Von den Stricken meiner Sünden" (From the bonds of my sins). This includes an intertwined oboe line that brings back many characteristics of the opening chorus. Another aria is an enchanting flute and soprano duet, "Ich folge dir gleichfalls". In this piece the verbs "ziehen" (to pull) and "schieben" (to push) stimulate Bach's delight in musical illustration. The third aria is a passionate tenor solo that is accompanied by all the instruments, "Ach, mein Sinn" (O my soul).
- The death of Jesus: "Es ist vollbracht! ..." ("It is accomplished; what comfort for suffering human souls! I can see the end of the night of sorrow. The hero from Judah ends his victorious fight. It is accomplished!"). The central part is essentially a viola da gamba solo and an alto aria. The theme is introduced by the viola da gamba gently accompanied by the basso continuo setting. Then comes the solo vocal interpretation.
- Closing chorale: Ach Herr, lass dein lieb Engelein ... (O Lord, let your dear little angels ...). This chorale – with alternative lyrics – is still in regular use in the congregations. The beginning of the theme is a descending sequence, but in overall the theme is full of emotion as well. Singing this chorale standalone, however, does not sound as a closing chorale, except if it is sung at the end of a real ceremony.

== Criticism ==
The text Bach set to music has been criticized as anti-Semitic. This accusation is closely connected to a wider controversy regarding the tone of the New Testament's Gospel of John with regards to Judaism.

Lukas Foss, who arrived in the United States in 1937 as a Jewish refugee from Nazi Germany, changed the text from "Juden" to "Leute" (people) when he conducted performances of the work. This has been the trend of numerous mainline Christian denominations since the late 20th century as well, for instance, the Episcopal Church, when they read the gospel during Good Friday services. Michael Marissen's Lutheranism, Anti-Judaism, and Bach's 'St John's Passion' examines the controversy in detail. He concludes that Bach's St John Passion and St Matthew Passion contain fewer statements derogatory toward Jews than many other contemporary musical settings of the Passion. He also noted that Bach used words for the commenting arias and hymns that tended to shift the blame for the death of Jesus from "the Jews" to the congregation of Christians.

== See also ==
- St John Passion discography
