= St John Passion structure =

Sacred oratorio by Johann Sebastian Bach

St John Passion
- BWV 245
- Passion by J. S. Bach
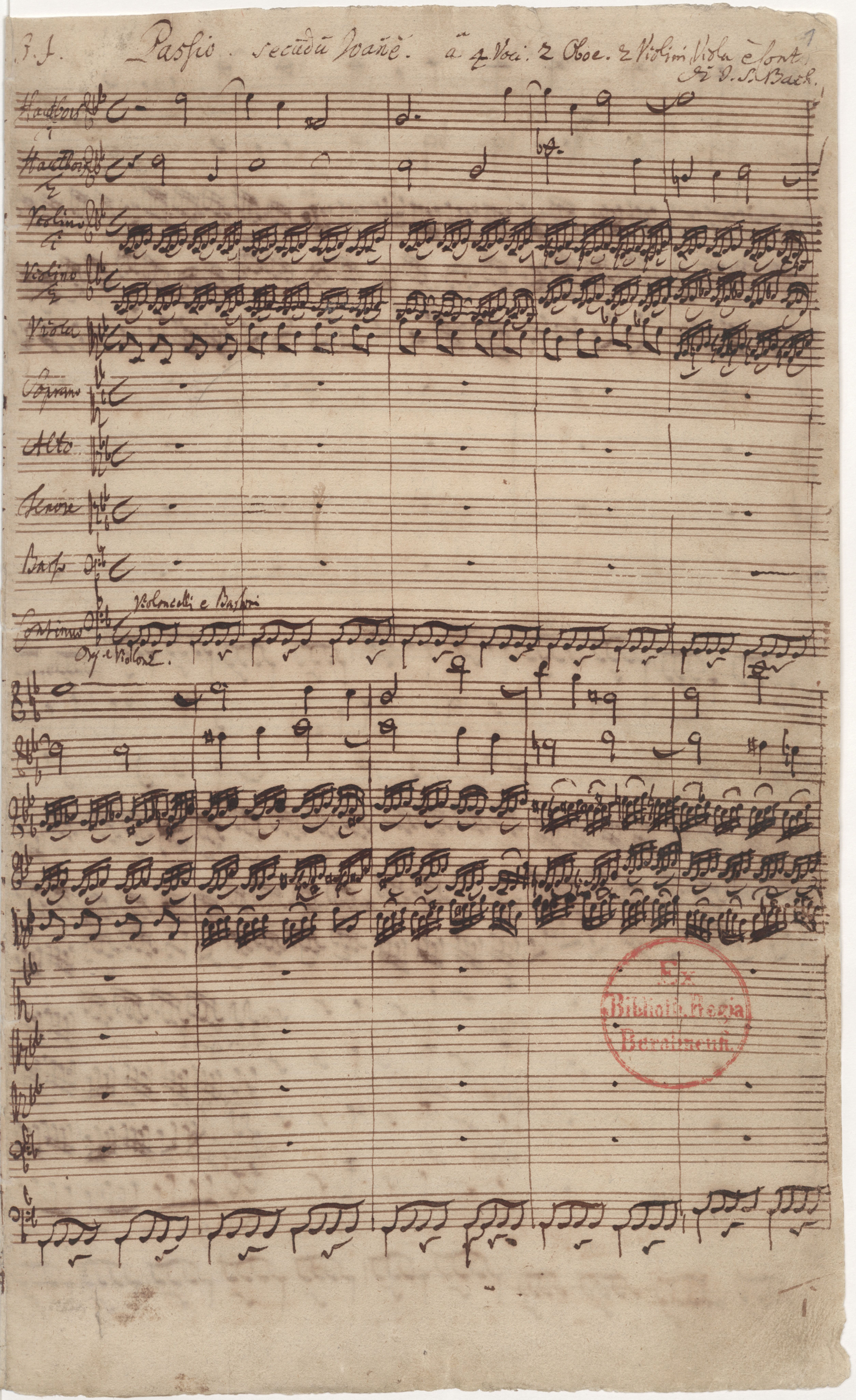
- First page of the autograph
- Native name: Passio secundum Joannem (Passion according to John)
- Occasion: Good Friday
- Bible text: John 18–19
- Chorale: Stanzas from 9 chorales (version 1)
- Performed: 7 April 1724: Leipzig (version 1); 30 March 1725: Leipzig (version 2); 1728/1732?: Leipzig (version 3); 1739/1749?: Leipzig (version 4)
- Movements: 40 in two parts (14 and 26)
- Vocal: SATB choir and solo
- Instrumental: 2 flauti traversi; 2 oboes; 2 oboes da caccia; 2 violins; viola; viola d'amore; viola da gamba; lute; continuo

The structure of the St John Passion (German: Johannes-Passion), BWV 245, a sacred oratorio by Johann Sebastian Bach first performed in Leipzig on Good Friday 1724, is "carefully designed with a great deal of musico-theological intent". Some main aspects of the structure are shown in tables below.

The original Latin title Passio secundum Joannem translates to "Passion according to John". Bach's large choral composition in two parts on German text, written to be performed in a Lutheran service on Good Friday, is based on the Passion, as told in two chapters from the Gospel of John (John 18 and John 19) in the translation by Martin Luther, with two short interpolations from the Gospel of Matthew (in the earliest version, one is from the Gospel of Matthew and one from the Gospel of Mark). During the vespers service, the two parts of the work were performed before and after the sermon. Part I covers the events until Peter's denial of Jesus, Part II concludes with the burial of Jesus. The Bible text is reflected in contemporary poetry and in chorales that often end a "scene" of the narration, similar to the way a chorale ends most Bach cantatas. An anonymous poet supplied a few texts himself, quoted from other Passion texts and inserted various stanzas of chorales by nine hymn writers. Bach led the first performance on 7 April 1724 in Leipzig's Nikolaikirche. He repeated it several times between 1724 and 1749, experimenting with different movements and changing others, which resulted in four versions (with a fifth one not performed in Bach's lifetime, but representing the standard version). The Passion, close to Bach's heart, has an "immediate dramatic quality".

== Structure ==
=== Text ===
==== Gospel ====
The gospel account by John narrates the story in five "scenes". The corresponding movement numbers are given from the Neue Bach-Ausgabe (NBA).

Part I

1. Arrest (1–5), Kidron Valley (John 18:1–11)
2. Denial (6–14), palace of the high priest Kaiphas (John 18:12–27)

Part II

1. Court hearing with Pontius Pilate (15–26) (John 18:28–40 and John 19:1–22)
2. Crucifixion and death (27–37), Golgotha (John 19:23–30)
3. Burial (38–40), burial site (John 19:31–42)

Some musicologists regard movement 24 as the conclusion of scene 3, the aria "Eilt, ihr angefocht'nen Seelen" which locates the action from the courthouse to Golgotha, the calvary. Others, including Alfred Dürr, regard the scene as ending with the last comment by Pilate.

Bach incorporated two short interpolations from the Gospel of Matthew (in Version I, one from Matthew and one from the Gospel of Mark), Matthew 26:75 after John 18:27, describing the weeping of Peter, and Matthew 27:51–52 after John 19:30, describing the tearing of the temple curtain (in Version I, this was replaced by Mark 15:38). The narrator is the Evangelist, a tenor. Jesus and all other male characters are sung by a bass (including Peter and Pilate) or tenor (servant); female characters (such as the Maid) are sung by a soprano, while the people who are often summarily called die Jüden (the Jews), the servants of the High Priest, and the soldiers are sung by a four-part chorus (SATB) in dramatic turba movements. The "immediate, dramatic quality" of the "kind of musical equivalent of the Passion Play" relies on the setting of the interaction between the historical persons (Jesus, Pilate, Peter, Maid, Servant) and the crowd ("soldiers, priests, and populace").

==== Chorales ====
At eleven moments in the Passion, stanzas from Lutheran chorales reflect the narration. Possibly Bach had an influence on their selection. He set them all in common time for four parts, the instruments playing colla parte with the voices.

Five chorales conclude a scene (in movements 5, 14, 26, 37 and 40); while a chorale opens Part II (15). Five chorales comment within a scene (3, 11, 17, 22, 28), including the central movement (22). One chorale accompanies the bass soloist in an aria (32).

Most chorale texts were written in the 16th and 17th century, by authors of the Reformation such as Martin Luther, Martin Schalling and Michael Weiße, and by hymn writers including Paul Gerhardt and Johann Heermann. The central chorale is not part of a common hymn, its text being taken from a libretto by Christian Heinrich Postel.

==== Contemporary text ====
The third source for the text is contemporary poetry that reflects the biblical narration. It was compiled by an unknown author, who partly used existing text: from the Brockes Passion (Der für die Sünde der Welt Gemarterte und Sterbende Jesus, aus den IV Evangelisten, Hamburg, 1712 and 1715) by Barthold Heinrich Brockes, he copied the text for movements 7, 19, 20, 24, 32, 34, 35 (partly) and 39; he found movement 13 in Christian Weise's Der Grünen Jugend Nothwendige Gedanken (Leipzig, 1675) and took from Postel's Johannes-Passion (c. 1700) movements 19 (partly), 22 and 30.

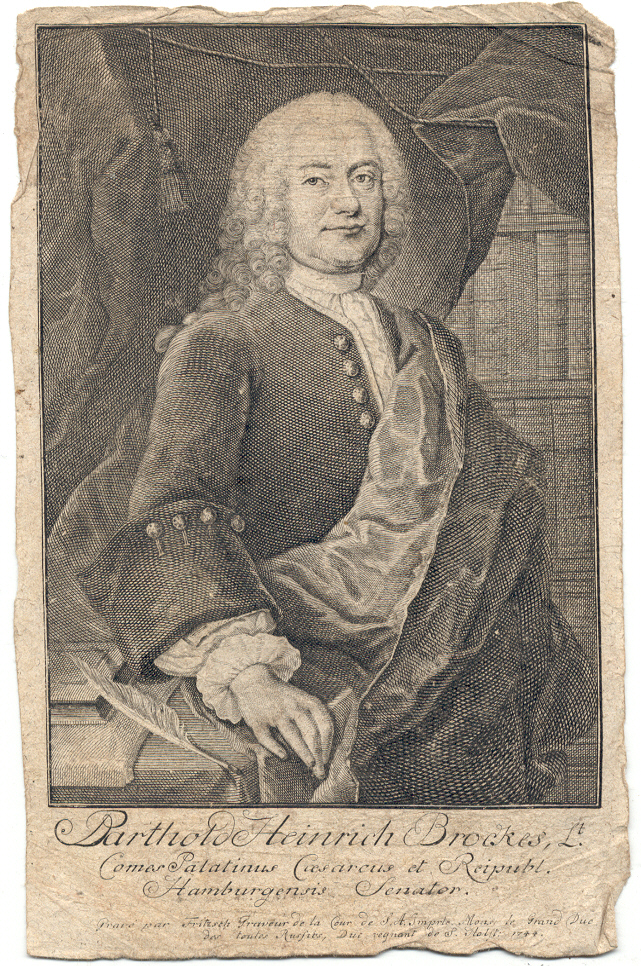
Barthold Heinrich Brockes, etching by Christian Fritzsch (1744)

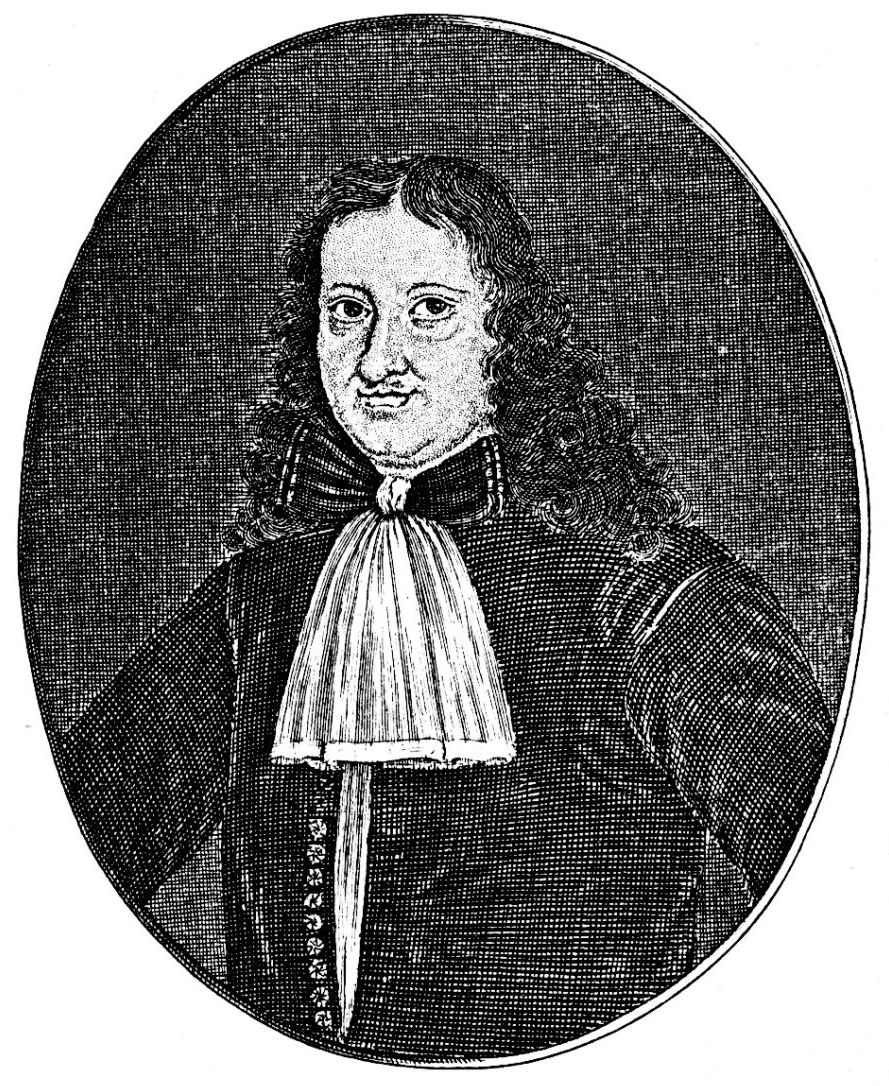
Christian Weise, etching by J.C. Böcklin

=== Scoring ===
The work is scored for vocal soloists (soprano, alto, tenor and bass), a four-part choir SATB, and an orchestra of two flauto traverso (Ft) (except for Version I, since all evidence of Bach's use of traverse flutes point to the 2nd Cantata Cycle as when he first used them), two oboes (Ob), two oboes da caccia (Oc), two oboes d'amore (Oa), two violins, viola (Va), and basso continuo. Bach added some instruments which were already old-fashioned at the time in arias for special effects, such as the archlute (Version I and 1739–1749 revision only, replaced by organ and/or harpsichord), the viola d'amore and the viola da gamba (Vg). Bach did not differentiate the vox Christi (voice of Christ), singing the words of Jesus, from the other bass recitatives and arias, nor the evangelist from the tenor arias.

=== Symmetry ===
The work displays a thoughtful symmetry. In the center of the five parts is the court hearing which confronts Jesus, Pilate, and the people. In the middle of the hearing, a chorale (22) interrupts the argument, which is a discussion about freedom and captivity. It is surrounded by two choral movements, which not only both ask for the crucifixion of Jesus, but also use the same musical motifs, the second time intensified. Again, in a repetition of similar musical material, a preceding turba choir explains the law, while a corresponding movement reminds Pilate of the Emperor whose authority is challenged by someone calling himself a king. Preceding this, Jesus is greeted in mockery as a king, corresponding in motif to the later request that Pilate should change the inscription saying he is "the King of the Jews" to "He said: I am the King of the Jews".

=== Versions ===
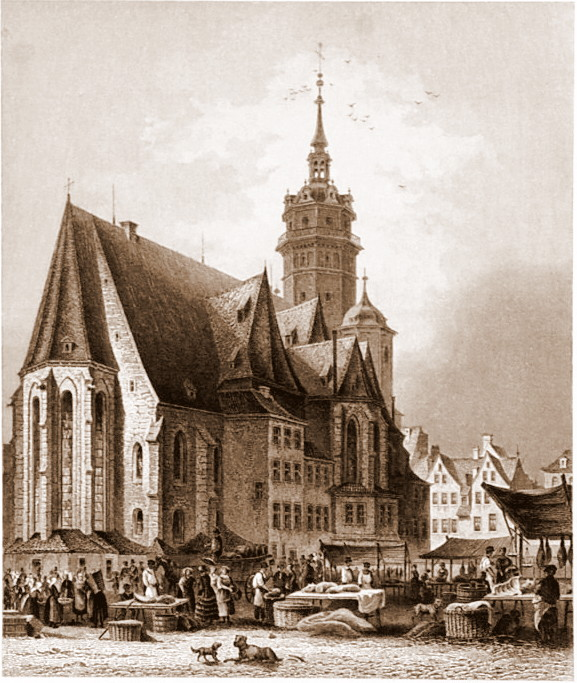
Nikolaikirche, c. 1850

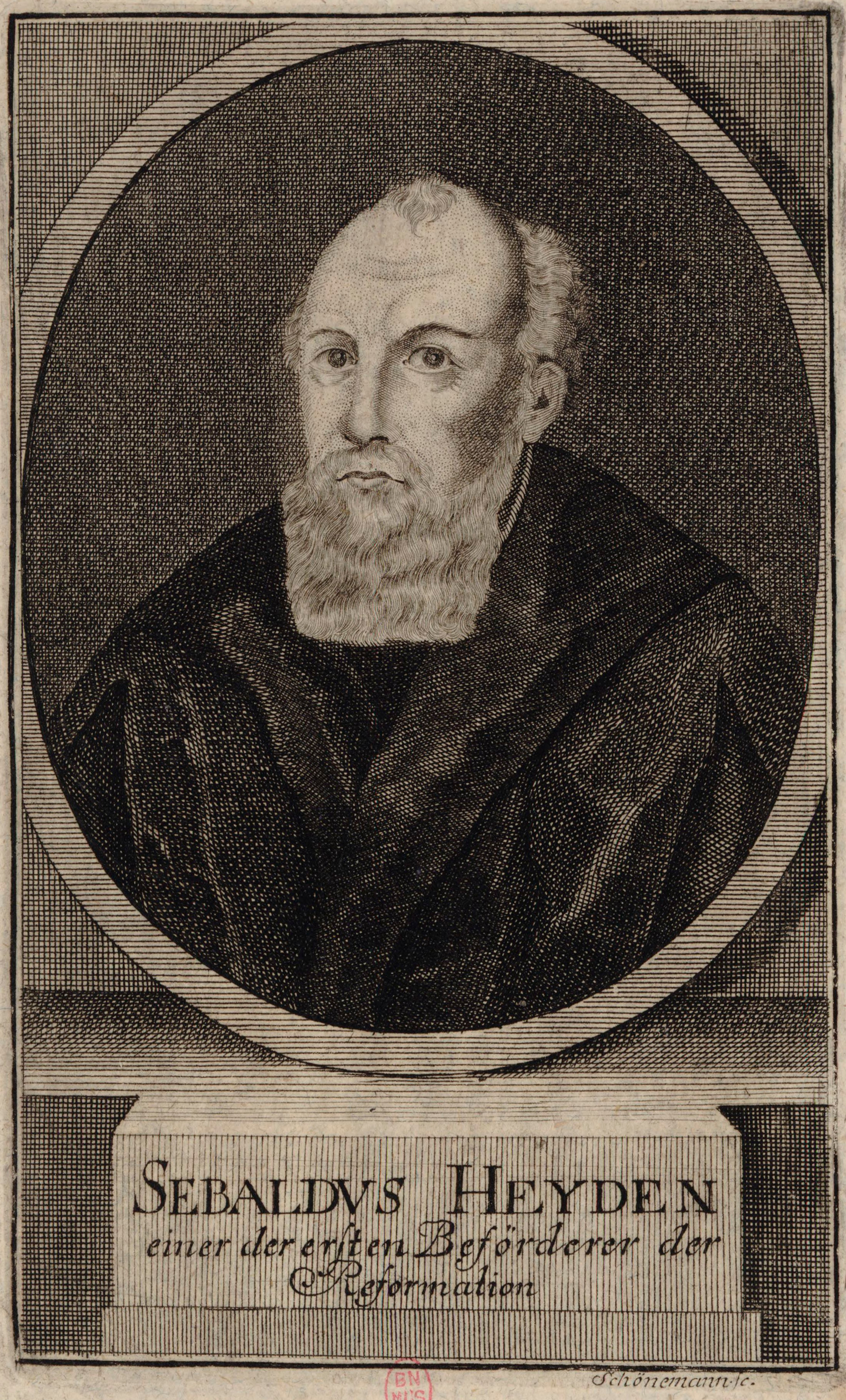
Sebald Heyden

Bach led the first performance on 7 April 1724 at the Nikolaikirche (St. Nicholas) as part of a Vesper service for Good Friday. Part I was performed before the sermon, Part II after the sermon. Bach performed a second version on Good Friday a year later, 30 March 1725. Other versions were performed between 1728 and 1732 (version 3), and in 1749 (version 4). A final, fifth version, revised between 1739 and 1749, was never performed in Bach's lifetime.

In version 2, Bach opened with a chorale fantasia on "O Mensch, bewein dein Sünde groß" (O man, bewail thy sins so great), the first stanza of a 1525 hymn by Sebald Heyden, a movement which he ultimately used to conclude Part I of his St Matthew Passion, returning to the previous chorus Herr, unser Herrscher in later versions of the St John Passion. He used three alternative arias, one of them with a chorale sung by the choir, and replaced the two closing movements, the chorus Ruht wohl and the chorale Ach Herr, laß dein lieb Engelein with the chorale fantasia on "Christe, du Lamm Gottes" (Christ, you Lamb of God), the German Agnus Dei, published in Braunschweig in 1528. Bach took this movement from his cantata Du wahrer Gott und Davids Sohn, BWV 23, which had been an audition piece for his post in Leipzig. Before, it had been part of his Weimarer Passion of 1717.

In version 3, after Bach wrote his St Matthew Passion, he returned the opening chorus Herr, unser Herrscher and the final chorus Ruht wohl to their initial position, but removed the Gospel passages from Matthew and the closing chorale.

In version 5 (never performed), possibly dating from as early 1739, Bach returned to the first version, but revised it thoroughly. He began a new score which covers 12 movements. As Christoph Wolff observes: "The fragmentary revised score constitutes an extensive stylistic overhaul with painstaking improvements to the part-writing and a partial restructuring of the instrumentation; particular attention was paid to the word-setting in the recitatives and the continuo accompaniment." In 1749, Bach performed the St John Passion once more, in an expanded and altered form from the 1724 version, in what would be his last performance of a Passion.

Wolff writes: "Bach experimented with the St John Passion as he did with no other large-scale composition", possible by the work's structure with the Gospel text as its backbone and interspersed features that could be exchanged. Wolff concludes: "the work accompanied Bach right from his first year as Kantor of St Thomas's to the penultimate year of his life and thus, for that reason alone, how close it must have been to his heart.

== Overview ==
In the following, the movement numbers are those of the NBA, version I, unless otherwise noted.

=== The chorales in detail ===
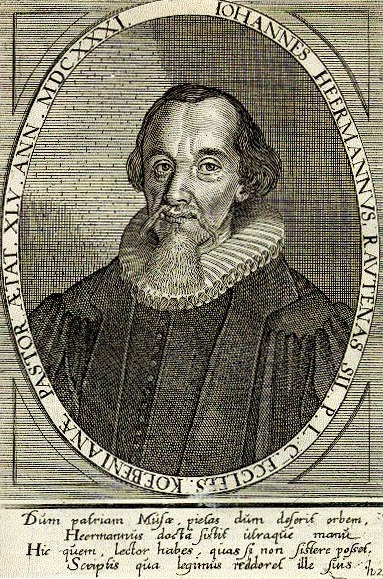
Johann Heermann, 1669

The first chorale, movement 3, is inserted after Jesus tells the crowd to arrest him, but let his disciples go. "O große Lieb, o Lieb ohn alle Maße" (O mighty love, O love beyond all measure) is stanza 7 of Johann Heermann's 1630 hymn "Herzliebster Jesu, was hast du verbrochen", part of a movement to make German a literary language by imposing strict rules of metre and hymn; the form is that of a Sapphic stanza with the characteristically short last forth line which here literally is a punch line, hitting home: "Und du mußt leiden" (And you must suffer). The hymn is based on a passion meditation which was attributed to the church father St Augustine (Meditationes Divi Augustini, chapter VII) – another nod to classical learning but with all the emotionally charged medieval rhetoric of Anselm of Canterbury or Bernard of Clairvaux. The text addresses the crucified Christ pondering on the bodily signs of the passion but even more on the significance of this display of suffering. This verse breaks into the exclamation of wonder: a highly emotionally charged start the triple ‘o’ in the first line and the neologism of the ‘Marterstraße’ in the second which Bach makes audible in the chromatically discordant setting. It imagines Christ being physically pushed by Love personified on the road of suffering while the singer lives with Mrs World in sinful pleasure – a combination of the medieval concept of the “Crucifixion by the virtues” with the pilgrim’s progress idea of encountering virtues and vices on the way.

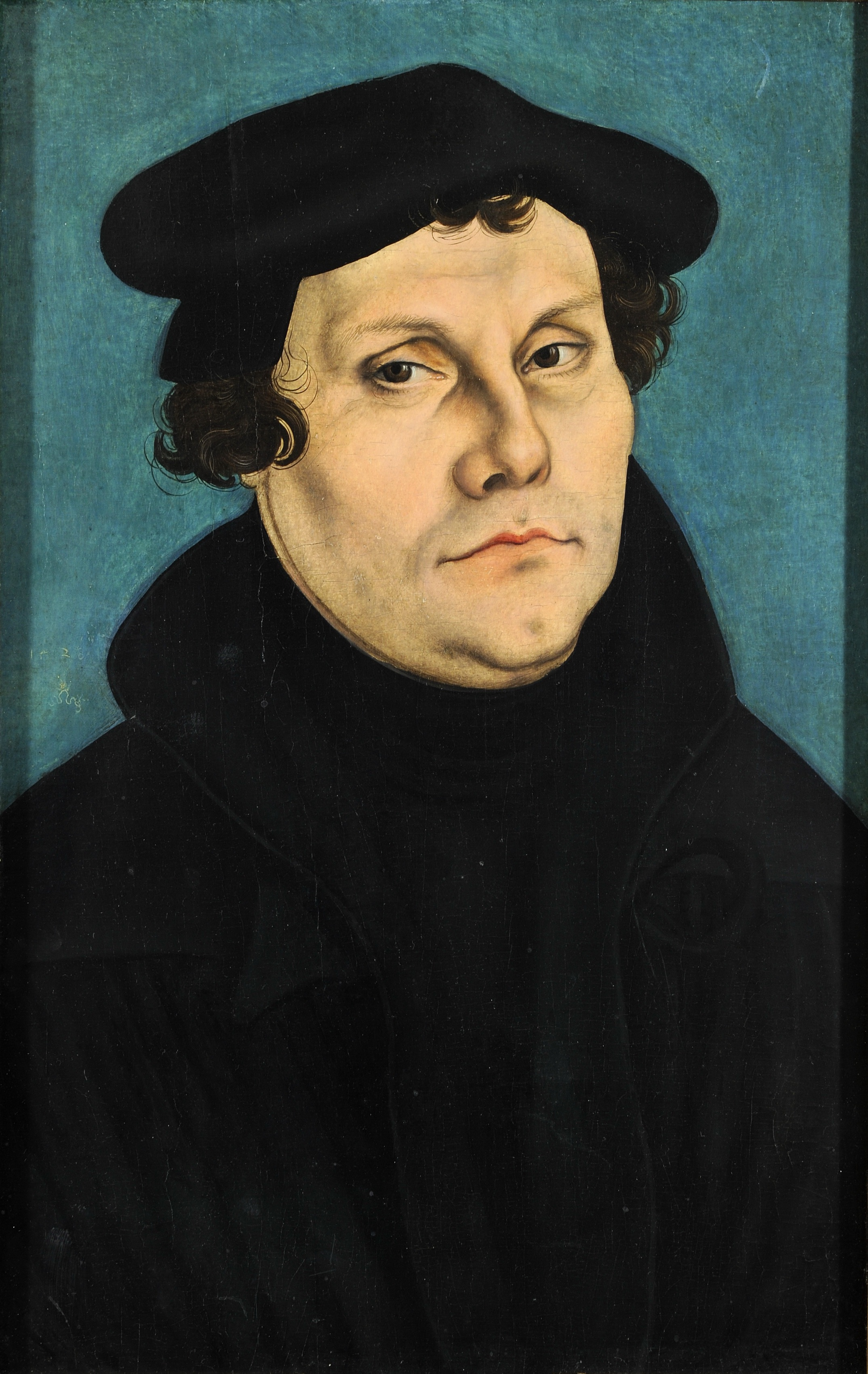
Martin Luther, 1528

The second chorale, movement 5, ends the first scene, after Jesus remarks that he has to be obedient. "Dein Will gescheh, Herr Gott, zugleich" (Your will be done, Lord God, alike) is stanza 4 of Luther's 1539 hymn "Vater unser im Himmelreich, a paraphrase of the Lord's Prayer.

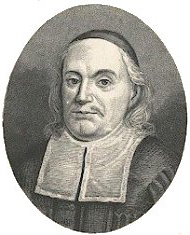
Paul Gerhardt

The third chorale, movement 11, is inserted after Jesus asks those who are beating him for justification. Two stanzas from Paul Gerhardt's 1647 hymn "O Welt, sieh hier dein Leben" comment the scene, stanza 3, "Wer hat dich so geschlagen" (Who has you now so stricken), and stanza 4, "Ich, ich und meine Sünden" (I, I and my transgressions), highlighting the personal responsibility of the speaking sinner for the suffering of Jesus.

The fourth chorale, movement 14, ends the second scene and Part I. After Peter's denial, "Petrus, der nicht denkt zurück" (Peter, when he fails to think) summarizes the scene with stanza 10 of Paul Stockmann's 1633 hymn "Jesu Leiden, Pein und Tod".

The fifth chorale, movement 15, opens Part II and the third scene. "Christus, der uns selig macht" (Christ, who has made us blessed), stanza 1 of Michael Weiße's 1531 hymn, summarizes what Jesus has to endure, even though he is innocent ("made captive, ... falsely indicted, and mocked and scorned and bespat").

The sixth chorale, movement 17, comments in two more stanzas from "Herzliebster Jesu" (3), after Jesus addresses the different people of his kingdom. Stanza 8, "Ach großer König, groß zu allen Zeiten" (Ah King so mighty, mighty in all ages) reflects the need for thanksgiving and stanza 9 the inability to grasp it, "Ich kanns mit meinen Sinnen nicht erreichen" (I cannot with my reason ever fathom).

The seventh chorale, movement 22, is the central movement of the whole Passion, which interrupts the conversation of Pilate and the crowd by a general statement of the importance of the passion for salvation: "Durch dein Gefängnis, Gottes Sohn, ist uns die Freiheit kommen" (Through your prison, Son of God, must come to us our freedom) is not part of a known hymn, but the text of an aria from a St John Passion by Postel from around 1700.

The eighth chorale, movement 26, ends the scene of the court hearing, after Pilate refuses to change the inscription. "In meines Herzens Grunde" (Within my heart's foundation) is stanza 3 of Valerius Herberger's 1613 hymn "Valet will ich dir geben".

The ninth chorale, movement 28, is related to Jesus telling his mother and John to take care of each other. "Er nahm alles wohl in acht" (He of all did well take heed) is stanza 20 of Stockmann's hymn (14).

The tenth chorale, movement 32, is part of the bass aria which follows immediately after the report of the death of Jesus. "Jesu, der du warest tot, lebest nun ohn' Ende" (Jesus, you who suffered death, now live forever) is the final stanza of Stockmann's hymn (14).

The eleventh chorale, movement 37, ends the scene of the crucifixion. "O hilf, Christe, Gottes Sohn" (O help, Christ, Son of God) is stanza 8 of Weiße's hymn (15).

The twelfth chorale, movement 40, ends the Passion. "Ach Herr, laß dein lieb Engelein" (Ah Lord, let your own angels dear) is stanza 3 of Martin Schalling's 1569 hymn "Herzlich lieb hab ich dich, o Herr".

=== Tables of movements ===
The following tables give an overview of all versions of the Passion, first performed in 1724. Two variants of movement numbering are given, first that of the Neue Bach-Ausgabe (NBA), then that of the Bach-Werke-Verzeichnis (BWV). Voices appear in one of three columns, depending on the text source: Bible, contemporary poetic reflection, or chorale. The instrumentation is added, using abbreviations for instruments, followed by key and time signature, and the NBA number of a corresponding movement within the work's symmetry.

==== Version I ====
There are no extant Flute parts for this version, so the movements that normally require them have violins instead. This was performed in 1724. The Bach Compendium lists it as BC D 2a

===== Part I =====
NBA		BWV	Bible	Reflection	Chorale	Beginning of text	Source	Instruments	Key	Time	Symmetry
1		1		Chorus		Herr, unser Herrscher	anonymous	2Ob 2Vn Va Bc	G minor	common time	39
2	a	2	Ev (T), Jesus (B)			Jesus ging mit seinen Jüngern	John 18:1–8	Bc	C Dorian mode	common time	
2	b	3	Chorus			Jesum von Nazareth	John 18:1–8	2Ob 2Vn Va Bc	G minor	common time	
2	c	4	Ev, Jesus			Jesus spricht zu ihnen	John 18:1–8	Bc	G minor	common time	
2	d	5	Chorus			Jesum von Nazareth	John 18:1–8	2Ob 2Vn Va Bc	C Dorian mode	common time	
2	e	6	Ev, Jesus			Jesus antwortete	John 18:1–8	Bc	C Dorian mode	common time	
3		7			Chorus	O große Lieb	Johann Heermann	2Ob 2Vn Va Bc	G minor	common time	
4		8	Ev, Jesus			Auf daß das Wort erfüllet würde	John 18:9–11	Bc	F Mixolydian mode	common time	
5		9			Chorus	Dein Will gescheh	Martin Luther	2Ob 2Vn Va Bc	D minor	common time	
6		10	Ev			Die Schar aber und der Oberhauptmann	John 18:12–14	Bc	F major	common time	
7		11		Aria Alto		Von den Stricken meiner Sünden	Brockes	2Ob Bc	D minor	3/4	
8		12	Ev			Simon Petrus aber folgete Jesu nach	John 18:15a	Bc	B♭ Lydian mode	common time	
9		13		Aria Soprano		Ich folge dir gleichfalls	anonymous	2Vn Bc	B♭ major	3/8	
10		14	Ev, Magd (S), Petrus (B), Jesus, Knecht (T)			Derselbige Jünger war dem Hohenpriester bekannt	John 18:15b–23	Bc	G minor A minor	common time	
11		15			Chorus	Wer hat dich so geschlagen	Paul Gerhardt	2Ob 2Vn Va Bc	A major	common time	
12	a	16	Ev			Und Hannas sandte ihn gebunden	John 18:24–27; Matthew 26:75	Bc	A Mixolydian mode	common time	
12	b	17	Chorus			Bist du nicht seiner Jünger einer	John 18:24–27; Matthew 26:75	2Ob 2Vn Va Bc	A Mixolydian mode	common time	
12	c	18	Ev, Petrus, Knecht			Er leugnete aber und sprach	John 18:24–27; Matthew 26:75	Bc	A Mixolydian mode B minor	common time	
13		19		Aria Tenor		Ach, mein Sinn	Christian Weise	2Vn Va Bc	F♯ minor	common time	
14		20			Chorus	Petrus, der nicht denkt zurück	Paul Stockmann	2Ft 2Ob 2Vn Va Bc	A major	common time	15

===== Part II =====
NBA		BWV	Bible	Reflection	Chorale	Beginning of text	Source	Instruments	Key	Time	Symmetry
15		21			Chorus	Christus, der uns selig macht	Michael Weiße	2Ob 2Vn Va Bc	E Phrygian mode	common time	14
16	a	22	Ev, Pilate (B)			Da führeten sie Jesum	John 18:28–36	Bc	A minor	common time	
16	b	23	Chorus			Wäre dieser nicht ein Übeltäter	John 18:28–36	2Ob 2Vn Va Bc	D Dorian mode	common time	
16	c	24	Ev, Pilate			Da sprach Pilatus zu ihnen	John 18:28–36	Bc	D Dorian mode	common time	
16	d	25	Chorus			Wir dürfen niemand töten	John 18:28–36	2Ob 2Vn Va Bc	A minor	common time	
16	e	26	Ev, Pilate, Jesus			Auf daß erfüllet würde das Wort	John 18:28–36	Bc	A minor	common time	
17		27			Chorus	Ach großer König	Johann Heermann	2Ob 2Vn Va Bc	A minor	common time	
18	a	28	Ev, Pilate, Jesus			Da sprach Pilatus zu ihm	John 18:37–40; John 19:1	Bc	C major	common time	
18	b	29	Chorus			Nicht diesen, sondern Barrabam	John 18:37–40; John 19:1	2Ob 2Vn Va Bc	D Dorian mode	common time	
18	c	30	Ev			Barrabas aber war ein Mörder	John 18:37–40; John 19:1	Bc	D Dorian mode	common time	
19		31		Arioso Bass		Betrachte, meine Seel'	Brockes; Christian Heinrich Postel	2 violas d'amore Archlute Bc	E♭ major	common time	
20		32		Aria Tenor		Erwäge, wie sein blutgefärbter Rücken	Brockes	2 violas d'amore Bc (most likely only Cello or Vg and Keyboard)	C minor	12/8	
21	a	33	Ev			Und die Kriegsknechte flochten eine Krone	John 19:2–12a	Bc	G minor	common time	
21	b	34	Chorus			Sei gegrüßet, lieber Jüdenkönig	John 19:2–12a	2Ob 2Vn Va Bc	B♭ major	6/4	25 b
21	c	35	Ev, Pilate			Und gaben ihm Backenstreiche	John 19:2–12a	Bc	G minor	common time	
21	d	36	Chorus			Kreuzige, kreuzige	John 19:2–12a	2Ob 2Vn Va Bc	G minor	common time	23 d
21	e	37	Ev, Pilate			Pilatus sprach zu ihnen	John 19:2–12a	Bc	G minor	common time	
21	f	38	Chorus			Wir haben ein Gesetz	John 19:2–12a	2Ob 2Vn Va Bc	F major	common time	23 b
21	g	39	Ev, Pilate, Jesus			Da Pilatus das Wort hörete	John 19:2–12a	Bc	E Phrygian mode	common time	23 a
22		40			Chorus	Durch dein Gefängnis, Gottes Sohn	Christian Heinrich Postel; Melody Johann Hermann Schein	2Ob 2Vn Va Bc	E major	common time	center
23	a	41	Ev			Die Jüden aber schrieen und sprachen	John 19:12b–17	Bc	E major	common time	21 g
23	b	42	Chorus			Lässest du diesen los	John 19:12b–17	1Ob 1 Oboe d'amore 2Vn Va Bc	E major	common time	21 f
23	c	43	Ev, Pilate			Da Pilatus das Wort hörete	John 19:12b–17	Bc	E major	common time	
23	d	44	Chorus			Weg, weg mit dem	John 19:12b–17	1Ob 1Oa 2Vn Va Bc	F♯ minor	common time	21 d
23	e	45	Ev, Pilate			Spricht Pilatus zu ihnen	John 19:12b–17	Bc	F♯ minor B minor	common time	
23	f	46	Chorus			Wir haben keinen König	John 19:12b–17	1Ob 1Oa 2Vn Va Bc	B minor	common time	
23	g	47	Ev			Da überantwortete er ihn	John 19:12b–17	Bc	B minor	common time	
24		48		Aria Bass	Soprano; Alto; Tenor	Eilt, ihr angefochtnen Seelen	Brockes	2Vn Va Bc	G minor	3/8	
25	a	49	Ev			Allda kreuzigten sie ihn	John 19:18–22	Bc	F Mixolydian mode	common time	
25	b	50	Chorus			Schreibe nicht: der Jüden König	John 19:18–22	2Ob 2Vn Va Bc	B♭ major	6/4	21 b
25	c	51	Ev, Pilate			Pilatus antwortet	John 19:18–22	Bc	B♭ major	common time	
26		52			Chorus	In meines Herzens Grunde	Valerius Herberger	2Ob 2Vn Va Bc	E♭ major	common time	
27	a	53	Ev			Die Kriegsknechte aber	John 19:23–27a	Bc	F Mixolydian mode	common time	
27	b	54	Chorus			Lasset uns den nicht zerteilen	John 19:23–27a	1Ob 1Oba 2Vn Va Bc	C major	3/4	
27	c	55	Ev, Jesus			Auf daß erfüllet würde die Schrift	John 19:23–27a	Bc	A minor	common time	Adagio for "Sie haben meine Kleider"
28		56			Chorus	Er nahm alles wohl in acht	Paul Stockmann	2Ob 2Vn Va Bc	A major	common time	
29		57	Ev, Jesus			Und von Stund an nahm sie der Jünger	John 19:27b–30a	Bc	D major	common time	
30		58		Aria Alto		Es ist vollbracht	Christian Heinrich Postel	Vg 2Vn Va Bc	B minor D major	3/4	Vg in middle section doubles Continuo.
31		59	Ev			Und neiget das Haupt	John 19:30b	Bc	F♯ Phrygian mode	common time	
32		60		Aria Bass	Chorus	Mein teurer Heiland, laß dich fragen	Brockes; Paul Stockmann	Bc	D major	12/8	
33		61	Ev			Und der Vorhang im Tempel zerriß	Mark 15:38	Bc	E Dorian mode	common time	Only 3 measures long
34		62		Arioso Tenor		Mein Herz, in dem die ganze Welt	Brockes	2Vn 2Oa 2Vn Va Bc	G major	common time	
35		63		Aria Soprano		Zerfließe, mein Herze	Brockes	Oc Vn Bc	F Dorian mode	3/8	
36		64	Ev			Die Jüden aber, dieweil es der Rüsttag war	John 19:31–37	Bc	C Dorian mode	common time	
37		65			Chorus	O hilf, Christe, Gottes Sohn	Michael Weiße	2Ob 2Vn Va Bc	B♭ Dorian mode	common time	
38		66	Ev			Darnach bat Pilatum Joseph von Arimathia	John 19:38–42	Bc	C Dorian mode	common time	23 measures
39		67		Chorus		Ruht wohl, ihr heiligen Gebeine	Brockes	2Ob 2Vn Va Bc	C Dorian mode	3/4	
40		68			Chorus	Ach Herr, laß dein lieb Engelein	Martin Schalling	2Ob 2Vn Va Bc	E♭ major	common time	

==== Version II ====
For this version (of 1725), in addition to the Flute parts (which were first used in late 1724 (after first Sunday after Trinity), Bach heavily revised both text and music. He added five movements from his Weimarer Passion, with three texts now thought to be by Christoph Birkmann. This is listed as BC 2b.

===== Part I =====
NBA		BWV	Bible	Reflection	Chorale	Beginning of text	Source	Instruments	Key	Time	Symmetry
1^{II} (BWV 244/29)		244/35			Chorus	O Mensch, bewein dein Sünde groß	Sebald Heyden	2Ft 2Ob 2Vn Va Bc	E♭ major	common time	
2	a	2	Ev, Jesus			Jesus ging mit seinen Jüngern	John 18:1–8	Bc	C Dorian mode	common time	
2	b	3	Chorus			Jesum von Nazareth	John 18:1–8	2Ft 2Ob 2Vn Va Bc	G minor	common time	
2	c	4	Ev, Jesus			Jesus spricht zu ihnen	John 18:1–8	Bc	G minor	common time	
2	d	5	Chorus			Jesum von Nazareth	John 18:1–8	2Ob 2Vn Va Bc	C Dorian mode	common time	
2	e	6	Ev, Jesus			Jesus antwortete	John 18:1–8	Bc	C Dorian mode	common time	
3		7			Chorus	O große Lieb	Johann Heermann	2Ft 2Ob 2Vn Va Bc	G minor	common time	
4		8	Ev, Jesus			Auf daß das Wort erfüllet würde	John 18:9–11	Bc	B♭ major	common time	
5		9			Chorus	Dein Will gescheh	Martin Luther	2Ft 2Ob 2Vn Va Bc	D minor	common time	
6		10	Ev			Die Schar aber und der Oberhauptmann	John 18:12–14	Bc	F major	common time	
7		11		Alto		Von den Stricken meiner Sünden	Brockes	2Ob Bc	D minor	3/4	
8		12	Ev			Simon Petrus aber folgete Jesu nach	John 18:15a	Bc	B♭ Lydian mode	common time	
9		13		Soprano		Ich folge dir gleichfalls	anonymous	2Ft Bc	B♭ major	3/8	
10		14	Ev, Magd (S), Petrus (B), Jesus, Knecht (T)			Derselbige Jünger war dem Hohenpriester bekannt	John 18:15b–23	Bc	G minor A minor	common time	
11		15			Chorus	Wer hat dich so geschlagen	Paul Gerhardt	2Ft 2Ob 2Vn Va Bc	A major	common time	
11^{+} (12)		245a		Aria Bass	Soprano	Himmel, reiße, Welt, erbebe	Christoph Birkmann; Paul Stockmann	2Ft Bc	F♯ minor	common time	
12 (13)	a	16	Ev			Und Hannas sandte ihn gebunden	John 18:24–27 Matthew 26:75	Bc	A Mixolydian mode	common time	
12 (13)	b	17	Chorus			Bist du nicht seiner Jünger einer	John 18:24–27 Matthew 26:75	2Ft 2Ob 2Vn Va Bc	A Mixolydian mode	common time	
12 (13)	c	18	Ev, Petrus, Knecht			Er leugnete aber und sprach	John 18:24–27 Matthew 26:75	Bc	A Mixolydian mode	common time	
13^{II} (14)		245b		Aria Tenor		Zerschmettert mich, ihr Felsen und ihr Hügel	Christoph Birkmann	2Vn Va Bc	A major	common time	
14 (15)		20			Chorus	Petrus, der nicht denkt zurück	Paul Stockmann	2Ft 2Ob 2Vn Va Bc	A major	common time	15

===== Part II =====
NBA		BWV	Bible	Reflection	Chorale	Beginning of text	Source	Instruments	Key	Time	Symmetry
15 (16)		21			Chorus	Christus, der uns selig macht	Michael Weiße	2Ob 2Vn Va Bc	E Phrygian mode	common time	14
16 (17)	a	22	Ev, Pilate (B)			Da führeten sie Jesum	John 18:28–36	Bc	A minor	common time	
16 (17)	b	23	Chorus			Wäre dieser nicht ein Übeltäter	John 18:28–36	2Ft 2Ob 2Vn Va Bc	D Dorian mode	common time	
16 (17)	c	24	Ev, Pilate			Da sprach Pilatus zu ihnen	John 18:28–36	Bc	D Dorian mode	common time	
16 (17)	d	25	Chorus			Wir dürfen niemand töten	John 18:28–36	2Ft 2Ob 2Vn Va Bc	A minor	common time	
16 (17)	e	26	Ev, Pilate, Jesus			Auf daß erfüllet würde das Wort	John 18:28–36	Bc	A minor	common time	
17 (18)		27			Chorus	Ach großer König	Johann Heermann	2Ft 2Ob 2Vn Va Bc	A minor	common time	
18 (19)	a	28	Ev, Pilate, Jesus			Da sprach Pilatus zu ihm	John 18:37–40; John 19:1	Bc	C major	common time	
18 (19)	b	29	Chorus			Nicht diesen, sondern Barrabam	John 18:37–40; John 19:1	2Ft 2Ob 2Vn Va Bc	D Dorian mode	common time	
18 (19)	c	30	Ev			Barrabas aber war ein Mörder	John 18:37–40; John 19:1	Bc	D Dorian mode	common time	
19^{II} (20)		245c		Aria Tenor		Ach windet euch nicht so, geplagte Seelen	Christoph Birkmann	2Ob Bc	C Dorian mode	cut time	
20				Discarded							
21	a	33	Ev			Und die Kriegsknechte flochten eine Krone	John 19:2–12a	Bc	G minor	common time	
21	b	34	Chorus			Sei gegrüßet, lieber Jüdenkönig	John 19:2–12a	2Ft 2Ob 2Vn Va Bc	B♭ major	6/4	25 b
21	c	35	Ev, Pilate			Und gaben ihm Backenstreiche	John 19:2–12a	Bc	G minor	common time	
21	d	36	Chorus			Kreuzige, kreuzige	John 19:2–12a	2Ft 2Ob 2Vn Va Bc	G minor	common time	23 d
21	e	37	Ev, Pilate			Pilatus sprach zu ihnen	John 19:2–12a	Bc	G minor	common time	
21	f	38	Chorus			Wir haben ein Gesetz	John 19:2–12a	2Ft 2Ob 2Vn Va Bc	F major	common time	23 b
21	g	39	Ev, Pilate, Jesus			Da Pilatus das Wort hörete	John 19:2–12a	Bc	E Phrygian mode	common time	23 a
22		40			Chorus	Durch dein Gefängnis, Gottes Sohn	Christian Heinrich Postel; Melody Johann Hermann Schein	2Ft 2Ob 2Vn Va Bc	E major	common time	center
23	a	41	Ev			Die Jüden aber schrieen und sprachen	John 19:12b–17	Bc	E major	common time	21 g
23	b	42	Chorus			Lässest du diesen los	John 19:12b–17	2Ft 1Ob 1 Oboe d'amore 2Vn Va Bc	E major	common time	21 f
23	c	43	Ev, Pilate			Da Pilatus das Wort hörete	John 19:12b–17	Bc	E major	common time	
23	d	44	Chorus			Weg, weg mit dem	John 19:12b–17	2Ft 1Ob 1Oa 2Vn Va Bc	F♯ minor	common time	21 d
23	e	45	Ev, Pilate			Spricht Pilatus zu ihnen	John 19:12b–17	Bc	F♯ minor B minor	common time	
23	f	46	Chorus			Wir haben keinen König	John 19:12b–17	2Ft 1Ob 1Oa 2Vn Va Bc	B minor	common time	
23	g	47	Ev			Da überantwortete er ihn	John 19:12b–17	Bc	B minor	common time	
24		48		Aria Bass	Soprano Alto Tenor	Eilt, ihr angefochtnen Seelen	Brockes	2Vn Va Bc	G minor	3/8	
25	a	49	Ev			Allda kreuzigten sie ihn	John 19:18–22	Bc	F Mixolydian mode	common time	
25	b	50	Chorus			Schreibe nicht: der Jüden König	John 19:18–22	2Ft 2Ob 2Vn Va Bc	B♭ major	6/4	21 b
25	c	51	Ev, Pilate			Pilatus antwortet	John 19:18–22	Bc	B♭ major	common time	
26		52			Chorus	In meines Herzens Grunde	Valerius Herberger	2Ft 2Ob 2Vn Va Bc	E♭ major	common time	
27	a	53	Ev			Die Kriegsknechte aber	John 19:23–27a	Bc	F Mixolydian mode	common time	
27	b	54	Chorus			Lasset uns den nicht zerteilen	John 19:23–27a	2Ft 1Ob 1Oba 2Vn Va Bc	C major	3/4	
27	c	55	Ev, Jesus			Auf daß erfüllet würde die Schrift	John 19:23–27a	Bc	A minor	common time	Adagio for "Sie haben meine Kleider"
28		56			Chorus	Er nahm alles wohl in acht	Paul Stockmann	2Ft 2Ob 2Vn Va Bc	A major	common time	
29		57	Ev, Jesus			Und von Stund an nahm sie der Jünger	John 19:27b–30a	Bc	D major	common time	
30		58		Aria Alto		Es ist vollbracht	Christian Heinrich Postel	Vg 2Vn Va Bc	B minor D major	3/4	
31		59	Ev			Und neiget das Haupt	John 19:30b	Bc	F♯ Phrygian mode	common time	
32		60		Aria Bass	Chorus	Mein teurer Heiland, laß dich fragen	Brockes; Paul Stockmann	2Vn Va Bc	D major	12/8	
33		61	Ev			Und siehe da, der Vorhang im Tempel zerriß	Matthew 27:51–52	Bc	E Dorian mode	common time	Now 7 measures long
34		62		Arioso Tenor		Mein Herz, in dem die ganze Welt	Brockes	2Ft 2Oc 2Vn Va Bc	G major	common time	
35		63		Aria Soprano		Zerfließe, mein Herze	Brockes	Ft Oc Bc	F Dorian mode	3/8	
36		64	Ev			Die Jüden aber, dieweil es der Rüsttag war	John 19:31–37	Bc	C Dorian mode	common time	
37		65			Chorus	O hilf, Christe, Gottes Sohn	Michael Weiße	2Ft 2Ob 2Vn Va Bc	B♭ Dorian mode	common time	
38		66	Ev			Darnach bat Pilatum Joseph von Arimathia	John 19:38–42	Bc	C Dorian mode	common time	
39		67		Chorus		Ruht wohl, ihr heiligen Gebeine	Brockes	2Ft 2Ob 2Vn Va Bc	C Dorian mode	3/4	
40^{II}		23/4			Chorus	Christe, du Lamm Gottes	Martin Luther	2Ft 2Ob 2Vn Va Bc	G minor	common time	Adagio; Andante

==== Version III ====
In this version, Bach reverted to the original layout (thus discarding the previous revisions and additions). However, he decided to compose a true St John Passion, and thus eliminated the material inserted from the Gospel of Matthew. Now 12c ends in Measure 31 and Movement 33 is eliminated altogether (replaced by a lost Sinfonia). He also dispensed with the Lute and the Viola d'amore, replacing them with an Organ and Violini con sordino. It was probably performed in 1730. This is listed as BC D 2c.

===== Part I =====
NBA		BWV	Bible	Reflection	Chorale	Beginning of text	Source	Instruments	Key	Time	Symmetry
1		1		Chorus		Herr, unser Herrscher	anonymous	2Ft 2Ob 2Vn Va Bc	G minor	common time	39
2	a	2	Ev (T), Jesus (B)			Jesus ging mit seinen Jüngern	John 18:1–8	Bc	C Dorian mode	common time	
2	b	3	Chorus			Jesum von Nazareth	John 18:1–8	2Ft 2Ob 2Vn Va Bc	G minor	common time	
2	c	4	Ev, Jesus			Jesus spricht zu ihnen	John 18:1–8	Bc	G minor	common time	
2	d	5	Chorus			Jesum von Nazareth	John 18:1–8	2Ob 2Vn Va Bc	C Dorian mode	common time	
2	e	6	Ev, Jesus			Jesus antwortete	John 18:1–8	Bc	C Dorian mode	common time	
3		7			Chorus	O große Lieb	Johann Heermann	2Ft 2Ob 2Vn Va Bc	G minor	common time	
4		8	Ev, Jesus			Auf daß das Wort erfüllet würde	John 18:9–11	Bc	B♭ major	common time	
5		9			Chorus	Dein Will gescheh	Martin Luther	2Ft 2Ob 2Vn Va Bc	D minor	common time	
6		10	Ev, Jesus			Die Schar aber und der Oberhauptmann	John 18:12–14	Bc	F major	common time	
7		11		Aria Alto		Von den Stricken meiner Sünden	Brockes	2Ob Bc	D minor	3/4	
8		12	Ev			Simon Petrus aber folgete Jesu nach	John 18:15a	Bc	B♭ Lydian mode	common time	
9		13		Aria Soprano		Ich folge dir gleichfalls	anonymous	2Ft Bc	B♭ major	3/8	
10		14	Ev, Magd (S), Petrus (B), Jesus, Knecht (T)			Derselbige Jünger war dem Hohenpriester bekannt	John 18:15b–23	Bc	G minor A minor	common time	
11		15			Chorus	Wer hat dich so geschlagen	Paul Gerhardt	2Ft 2Ob 2Vn Va Bc	A major	common time	
12	a	16	Ev			Und Hannas sandte ihn gebunden	John 18:24–27	Bc	A Mixolydian mode	common time	
12	b	17	Chorus			Bist du nicht seiner Jünger einer	John 18:24–27	2Ft 2Ob 2Vn Va Bc	A Mixolydian mode	common time	
12	c	18	Ev, Petrus, Knecht			Er leugnete aber und sprach	John 18:24–27	Bc	A Mixolydian mode B minor	common time	12c ends with "und alsobald krähete der Hahn" in B minor.
13^{III}				Tenor		?			E minor G major	?	Aria lost.
14		20			Chorus	Petrus, der nicht denkt zurück	Paul Stockmann	2Ft 2Ob 2Vn Va Bc	G major	common time	15

===== Part II =====
NBA		BWV	Bible	Reflection	Chorale	Beginning of text	Source	Instruments	Key	Time	Symmetry	
15		21			Chorus	Christus, der uns selig macht	Michael Weiße	2Ob 2Vn Va Bc	E Phrygian mode	common time	14	
16	a	22	Ev, Pilate (B)			Da führeten sie Jesum	John 18:28–36	Bc	A minor	common time		
16	b	23	Chorus			Wäre dieser nicht ein Übeltäter	John 18:28–36	2Ft 2Ob 2Vn Va Bc	D Dorian mode	common time		
16	c	24	Ev, Pilate			Da sprach Pilatus zu ihnen	John 18:28–36	Bc	D Dorian mode	common time		
16	d	25	Chorus			Wir dürfen niemand töten	John 18:28–36	2Ft 2Ob 2Vn Va Bc	A minor	common time		
16	e	26	Ev, Pilate, Jesus			Auf daß erfüllet würde das Wort	John 18:28–36	Bc	A minor	common time		
17		27			Chorus	Ach großer König	Johann Heermann	2Ob 2Vn Va Bc	A minor	common time		
18	a	28	Ev, Pilate, Jesus			Da sprach Pilatus zu ihm	John 18:37–40; John 19:1	Bc	C major	common time		
18	b	29	Chorus			Nicht diesen, sondern Barrabam	John 18:37–40; John 19:1	2Ft 2Ob 2Vn Va Bc	D Dorian mode	common time		
18	c	30	Ev			Barrabas aber war ein Mörder	John 18:37–40; John 19:1	Bc	D Dorian mode	common time		
19		31		Arioso Bass		Betrachte, meine Seel	Brockes; Christian Heinrich Postel	2Vn con sordinis Bc with organ	E♭ major	common time		
20		32		Aria Tenor		Erwäge, wie sein blutgefärbter Rücken	Brockes	2Vn con sordini Bc (most likely only Cello or Vg and Keyboard)	C minor	12/8		
21	a	33	Ev			Und die Kriegsknechte flochten eine Krone	John 19:2–12a	Bc	G minor	common time		
21	b	34	Chorus			Sei gegrüßet, lieber Jüdenkönig	John 19:2–12a	2Ft 2Ob 2Vn Va Bc (violins double the winds)	B♭ major	6/4	25 b	
21	c	35	Ev, Pilate			Und gaben ihm Backenstreiche	John 19:2–12a	Bc	G minor	common time		
21	d	36	Chorus			Kreuzige, kreuzige	John 19:2–12a	2Ft 2Ob 2Vn Va Bc	G minor	common time	23 d	
21	e	37	Ev, Pilate			Pilatus sprach zu ihnen	John 19:2–12a	Bc	G minor	common time		
21	f	38	Chorus			Wir haben ein Gesetz	John 19:2–12a	2Ob 2Vn Va Bc	F major	common time	23 b	
21	g	39	Ev, Pilate, Jesus			Da Pilatus das Wort hörete	John 19:2–12a	Bc	E Phrygian mode	common time	23 a	
22		40			Chorus	Durch dein Gefängnis, Gottes Sohn	Christian Heinrich Postel; Melody Johann Hermann Schein	2Ft 2Ob 2Vn Va Bc	E major	common time	center	
23	a	41	Ev			Die Jüden aber schrieen und sprachen	John 19:12b–17	Bc	E major	common time	21 g	
23	b	42	Chorus			Lässest du diesen los	John 19:12b–17	2Ft 1Ob 1 Oboe d'amore 2Vn Va Bc	E major	common time	21 f	
23	c	43	Ev, Pilate			Da Pilatus das Wort hörete	John 19:12b–17	Bc	E major	common time		
23	d	44	Chorus			Weg, weg mit dem	John 19:12b–17	2Ft 1Ob 1Oa 2Vn Va Bc	F♯ minor	common time	21 d	
23	e	45	Ev, Pilate			Spricht Pilatus zu ihnen	John 19:12b–17	Bc	F♯ minor B minor	common time		
23	f	46	Chorus			Wir haben keinen König	John 19:12b–17	2Ft 1Ob 1Oa 2Vn Va Bc	B minor	common time		
23	g	47	Ev			Da überantwortete er ihn	John 19:12b–17	Bc	B minor	common time		
24		48		Aria bass	Soprano Alto Tenor	Eilt, ihr angefochtnen Seelen	Brockes	2Vn Va Bc	G minor	3/8		
25	a	49	Ev			Allda kreuzigten sie ihn	John 19:18–22	Bc	F Mixolydian mode	common time		
25	b	50	Chorus			Schreibe nicht: der Jüden König	John 19:18–22	2Ft 2Ob 2Vn Va Bc	B♭ major	6/4	21 b	1Vn each doubles winds
25	c	51	Ev, Pilate			Pilatus antwortet	John 19:18–22	Bc	B♭ major	common time		
26		52			Chorus	In meines Herzens Grunde	Valerius Herberger	2Ft 2Ob 2Vn Va Bc	E♭ major	common time		
27	a	53	Ev			Die Kriegsknechte aber	John 19:23–27a	Bc	F Mixolydian mode	common time		
27	b	54	Chorus			Lasset uns den nicht zerteilen	John 19:23–27a	2Ft 1Ob 1Oba 2Vn Va Bc	C major	3/4		
27	c	55	Ev, Jesus			Auf daß erfüllet würde die Schrift	John 19:23–27a	Bc	A minor	common time	Adagio for "Sie haben meine Kleider"	
28		56			Chorus	Er nahm alles wohl in acht	Paul Stockmann	2Ft 2Ob 2Vn Va Bc	A major	common time		
29		57	Ev, Jesus			Und von Stund an nahm sie der Jünger	John 19:27b–30a	Bc	D major	common time		
30		58		Aria Alto		Es ist vollbracht	Christian Heinrich Postel	Vg 2Vn Va Bc	B minor D major	3/4	Middle section: Vg doubles Alto (8vb).	
31		59	Ev			Und neiget das Haupt	John 19:30b	Bc	F♯ Phrygian mode	common time		
32		60		Aria Bass	Chorus	Mein teurer Heiland, laß dich fragen	Brockes; Paul Stockmann	2Vn Va Bc	D major	12/8		
33		61				Sinfonia		1Ob 2Vn Va Bc or 2Ob Taille (instrument) 1Bsn	C Dorian mode	common time	Lost, possibly identical to BWV 246(?)	
34				Discarded								
35				Discarded								
36		64	Ev			Die Jüden aber, dieweil es der Rüsttag war	John 19:31–37	Bc	C Dorian mode	common time		
37		65			Chorus	O hilf, Christe, Gottes Sohn	Michael Weiße	2Ft 2Ob 2Vn Va Bc	B♭ Dorian mode	common time		
38		66	Ev			Darnach bat Pilatum Joseph von Arimathia	John 19:38–42	Bc	C Dorian mode	common time	25 measures	
39		67		Chorus		Ruht wohl, ihr heiligen Gebeine	Brockes	2Ft 2Ob 2Vn Va Bc	C Dorian mode	3/4		
40					Discarded							

==== Standard Version (1739–1749) ====
Essentially a reworking of the 1724 Version, this version is the most detail-oriented revision of the work. On 17 March 1739, while still working on this revision, Bach was informed that the performance of the Passion setting could not go ahead without official permission, thus (most likely) effectively halting any plans for that year. In response, Bach performed the Brockes-Passion of his friend, Georg Philipp Telemann (TVWV 5:1). However, though he had stopped at measure 42 of Movement 10, he continued to work on this revision, as shown by the copyists' score and parts. It is listed as BC D 2e.

===== Part I =====
NBA		BWV	Bible	Reflection	Chorale	Beginning of text	Source	Instruments	Key	Time	Symmetry	
1		1		Chorus		Herr, unser Herrscher	anonymous	2Ft 2Ob 2Vn Va Bc	G minor	common time	39	All choral sections and instrumental ritornellos now include a Contrabassoon in the Continuo part; much voice and instrumental details altered; Slight changes in voice-leading and instrumental parts throughout work.
2	a	2	Ev (T), Jesus (B)			Jesus ging mit seinen Jüngern	John 18:1–8	Bc	C Dorian mode	common time	Slight change in voice-leading and other details.	
2	b	3	Chorus			Jesum von Nazareth	John 18:1–8	2Ft 2Ob 2Vn Va Bc	G minor	common time	Slight change in voice-leading and other details.	
2	c	4	Ev, Jesus			Jesus spricht zu ihnen	John 18:1–8	Bc	G minor	common time	Slight change in voice-leading and other details.	
2	d	5	Chorus			Jesum von Nazareth	John 18:1–8	2Ob 2Vn Va Bc	C Dorian mode	common time	Slight change in voice-leading and other details.	
2	e	6	Ev, Jesus			Jesus antwortete	John 18:1–8	Bc	C Dorian mode	common time	Slight change in voice-leading and other details.	
3		7			Chorus	O große Lieb	Johann Heermann	2Ft 2Ob 2Vn Va Bc	G minor	common time	More flowing/less chordal; now ends in G major	
4		8	Ev, Jesus			Auf daß das Wort erfüllet würde	John 18:9–11	Bc	F Mixolydian mode	common time	Jesus recitative now accompanied by flowing Continuo part rather than chordal.	
5		9			Chorus	Dein Will gescheh	Martin Luther	2Ft 2Ob 2Vn Va Bc	D minor	common time		
6		10	Ev, Jesus			Die Schar aber und der Oberhauptmann	John 18:12–14	Bc	F major	common time	Slight alteration in voice-leading; ends with stronger cadence.	
7		11		Aria Alto		Von den Stricken meiner Sünden	Brockes	2Ob Bc	D minor	3/4	Voice-leading and instrumental notation and Continuo part altered.	
8		12	Ev			Simon Petrus aber folgete Jesu nach	John 18:15a	Bc	B♭ Lydian mode	common time		
9		13		Aria Soprano		Ich folge dir gleichfalls	anonymous	2Ft Bc	B♭ major	3/8	Voice-leading and instrumental notation altered; a measure inserted after measure 146; Final ritornello reduced by 8 bars.	
10		14	Ev, Magd (S), Petrus (B), Jesus, Knecht (T)			Derselbige Jünger war dem Hohenpriester bekannt	John 18:15b–23	Bc	G minor A minor	common time	Most extensive revision in voice-leading and instrumental notation.	
11		15			Chorus	Wer hat dich so geschlagen	Paul Gerhardt	2Ft 2Ob 2Vn Va Bc	A major	common time		
12	a	16	Ev			Und Hannas sandte ihn gebunden	John 18:24–27; Matthew 26:75	Bc	A Mixolydian mode	common time	Slight change in voice-leading and other details.	
12	b	17	Chorus			Bist du nicht seiner Jünger einer	John 18:24–27; Matthew 26:75	2Ft 2Ob 2Vn Va Bc	A Mixolydian mode	common time	Slight change in voice-leading and other details.	
12	c	18	Ev, Petrus, Knecht			Er leugnete aber und sprach	John 18:24–27; Matthew 26:75	Bc	A Mixolydian mode B minor	common time	Slight change in voice-leading and other details.	
13		19		Aria Tenor		Ach, mein Sinn	Christian Weise	2Ft 2Ob 2Vn Va Bc	F♯ minor	3/4	Marked "tutti gli Stromenti".	
14		20			Chorus	Petrus, der nicht denkt zurück	Paul Stockmann	2Ft 2Ob 2Vn Va Bc	A major	common time	15	

===== Part II =====
NBA		BWV	Bible	Reflection	Chorale	Beginning of text	Source	Instruments	Key	Time	Symmetry
15		21			Chorus	Christus, der uns selig macht	Michael Weiße	2Ft 2Ob 2Vn Va Bc	E Phrygian mode	common time	14
16	a	22	Ev, Pilate (B)			Da führeten sie Jesum	John 18:28–36	Bc	A minor	common time	
16	b	23	Chorus			Wäre dieser nicht ein Übeltäter	John 18:28–36	2Ft 2Ob 2Vn Va Bc	D Dorian mode	common time	
16	c	24	Ev, Pilate			Da sprach Pilatus zu ihnen	John 18:28–36	Bc	D Dorian mode	common time	
16	d	25	Chorus			Wir dürfen niemand töten	John 18:28–36	2Ft 2Ob 2Vn Va Bc	A minor	common time	
16	e	26	Ev, Pilate, Jesus			Auf daß erfüllet würde das Wort	John 18:28–36	Bc	A minor	common time	
17		27			Chorus	Ach großer König	Johann Heermann	2Ft 2Ob 2Vn Va Bc	A minor	common time	
18	a	28	Ev, Pilate, Jesus			Da sprach Pilatus zu ihm	John 18:37–40; John 19:1	Bc	C major	common time	
18	b	29	Chorus			Nicht diesen, sondern Barrabam	John 18:37–40; John 19:1	2Ft 2Ob 2Vn Va Bc	D Dorian mode	common time	
18	c	30	Ev			Barrabas aber war ein Mörder	John 18:37–40; John 19:1	Bc	D Dorian mode	common time	
19		31		Arioso bass		Betrachte, meine Seel'	Brockes; Christian Heinrich Postel	2 violas d'amore Bc with Archlute	E♭ major	common time	
20		32		Aria Tenor		Erwäge, wie sein blutgefärbter Rücken	Brockes	2 violas d'amore Bc (most likely only Cello or Vg and Keyboard)	C minor	12/8	
21	a	33	Ev			Und die Kriegsknechte flochten eine Krone	John 19:2–12a	Bc	G minor	common time	
21	b	34	Chorus			Sei gegrüßet, lieber Jüdenkönig	John 19:2–12a	2Ft 2Ob 2Vn Va Bc	B♭ major	6/4	25 b
21	c	35	Ev, Pilate			Und gaben ihm Backenstreiche	John 19:2–12a	Bc	G minor	common time	
21	d	36	Chorus			Kreuzige, kreuzige	John 19:2–12a	2Ft 2Ob 2Vn Va Bc	G minor	common time	23 d
21	e	37	Ev, Pilate			Pilatus sprach zu ihnen	John 19:2–12a	Bc	G minor	common time	
21	f	38	Chorus			Wir haben ein Gesetz	John 19:2–12a	2Ft 2Ob 2Vn Va Bc	F major	common time	23 b
21	g	39	Ev, Pilate, Jesus			Da Pilatus das Wort hörete	John 19:2–12a	Bc	E Phrygian mode	common time	23 a
22		40			Chorus	Durch dein Gefängnis, Gottes Sohn	Christian Heinrich Postel; Melody Johann Hermann Schein	2Ft 2Ob 2Vn Va Bc	E major	common time	center
23	a	41	Ev			Die Jüden aber schrieen und sprachen	John 19:12b–17	Bc	E major	common time	21 g
23	b	42	Chorus			Lässest du diesen los	John 19:12b–17	1Ob 1 Oboe d'amore 2Vn Va Bc	E major	common time	21 f
23	c	43	Ev, Pilate			Da Pilatus das Wort hörete	John 19:12b–17	Bc	E major	common time	
23	d	44	Chorus			Weg, weg mit dem	John 19:12b–17	2Ft 1Ob 1Oa 2Vn Va Bc	F♯ minor	common time	21 d
23	e	45	Ev, Pilate			Spricht Pilatus zu ihnen	John 19:12b–17	Bc	F♯ minor B minor	common time	
23	f	46	Chorus			Wir haben keinen König	John 19:12b–17	2Ft 1Ob 1Oa 2Vn Va Bc	B minor	common time	
23	g	47	Ev			Da überantwortete er ihn	John 19:12b–17	Bc	B minor	common time	
24		48		Aria Bass	Soprano; Alto; Tenor	Eilt, ihr angefochtnen Seelen	Brockes	2Vn Va Bc	G minor	3/8	
25	a	49	Ev			Allda kreuzigten sie ihn	John 19:18–22	Bc	F Mixolydian mode	common time	
25	b	50	Chorus			Schreibe nicht: der Jüden König	John 19:18–22	2Ft 2Ob 2Vn Va Bc	B♭ major	6/4	21 b
25	c	51	Ev, Pilate			Pilatus antwortet	John 19:18–22	Bc	B♭ major	common time	
26		52			Chorus	In meines Herzens Grunde	Valerius Herberger	2Ft 2Ob 2Vn Va Bc	E♭ major	common time	
27	a	53	Ev			Die Kriegsknechte aber	John 19:23–27a	Bc	F Mixolydian mode	common time	
27	b	54	Chorus			Lasset uns den nicht zerteilen	John 19:23–27a	2Ft 1Ob 1Oba 2Vn Va Bc	C major	3/4	
27	c	55	Ev, Jesus			Auf daß erfüllet würde die Schrift	John 19:23–27a	Bc	A minor	common time	Adagio for "Sie haben meine Kleider"
28		56			Chorus	Er nahm alles wohl in acht	Paul Stockmann	2Ob 2Vn Va Bc	A major	common time	
29		57	Ev, Jesus			Und von Stund an nahm sie der Jünger	John 19:27b–30a	Bc	D major	common time	
30		58		Aria Alto		Es ist vollbracht	Christian Heinrich Postel	Vg 2Vn Va Bc	B minor D major	3/4	Middle section: Vg doubles Continuo.
31		59	Ev			Und neiget das Haupt	John 19:30b	Bc	F♯ Phrygian mode	common time	
32		60		Aria Bass	Chorus	Mein teurer Heiland, laß dich fragen	Brockes; Paul Stockmann	2Vn Va Bc	D major	12/8	
33		61	Ev			Und siehe da, der Vorhang im Tempel zerriß	Matthew 27:51–52	Bc	E Dorian mode	common time	
34		62		Arioso Tenor		Mein Herz, in dem die ganze Welt	Brockes	2Ft 2Oc 2Vn Va Bc	G major	common time	
35		63		Aria Soprano		Zerfließe, mein Herze	Brockes	2Ft 2Oc Bc	F Dorian mode	3/8	
36		64	Ev			Die Jüden aber, dieweil es der Rüsttag war	John 19:31–37	Bc	C Dorian mode	common time	
37		65			Chorus	O hilf, Christe, Gottes Sohn	Michael Weiße	2Ft 2Ob 2Vn Va Bc	B♭ Dorian mode	common time	
38		66	Ev			Darnach bat Pilatum Joseph von Arimathia	John 19:38–42	Bc	C Dorian mode	common time	
39		67		Chorus		Ruht wohl, ihr heiligen Gebeine	Brockes	2Ft 2Ob 2Vn Va Bc	C Dorian mode	3/4	
40		68			Chorus	Ach Herr, laß dein lieb Engelein	Martin Schalling	2Ft 2Ob 2Vn Va Bc	E♭ major	common time	

==== Version IV ====
Essentially a re-production of Version I with a few alterations (text changes in Movements 9, 19 & 20, instrumentation reflective of Version III). It was performed in 1749 and (most likely) repeated in 1750. It also represents (outside of the St Matthew Passion) the largest instrumental ensemble used (calling for 3 1st Violins), and (for the first time in his work) calls for a Contrabassoon (used in all choral parts, as well as instrumental ritornellos). It is listed as BC D 2d.

===== Part I =====
NBA		BWV	Bible	Reflection	Chorale	Beginning of text	Source	Instruments	Key	Time	Symmetry
1		1		Chorus		Herr, unser Herrscher	anonymous	2Ft 2Ob 2Vn Va Bc	G minor	common time	39
2	a	2	Ev (T), Jesus (B)			Jesus ging mit seinen Jüngern	John 18:1–8	Bc	C Dorian mode	common time	
2	b	3	Chorus			Jesum von Nazareth	John 18:1–8	2Ft 2Ob 2Vn Va Bc	G minor	common time	
2	c	4	Ev, Jesus			Jesus spricht zu ihnen	John 18:1–8	Bc	G minor	common time	
2	d	5	Chorus			Jesum von Nazareth	John 18:1–8	2Ob 2Vn Va Bc	C Dorian mode	common time	
2	e	6	Ev, Jesus			Jesus antwortete	John 18:1–8	Bc	C Dorian mode	common time	
3		7			Chorus	O große Lieb	Johann Heermann	2Ft 2Ob 2Vn Va Bc	G minor	common time	
4		8	Ev, Jesus			Auf daß das Wort erfüllet würde	John 18:9–11	Bc	F Mixolydian mode	common time	
5		9			Chorus	Dein Will gescheh	Martin Luther	2Ft 2Ob 2Vn Va Bc	D minor	common time	
6		10	Ev, Jesus			Die Schar aber und der Oberhauptmann	John 18:12–14	Bc	F major	common time	
7		11		Aria Alto		Von den Stricken meiner Sünden	Brockes	2Ob Bc	D minor	3/4	Continuo like revision.
8		12	Ev			Simon Petrus aber folgete Jesu nach	John 18:15a	Bc	B♭ Lydian mode	common time	
9		13		Aria Soprano		Ich folge dir gleichfalls	anonymous	2Ft Bc	B♭ major	3/8	a measure inserted after measure 146; Text changed: "Ich folge dir gleichfalls, mein Heiland, mit Freuden", etc.
10		14	Ev, Magd (S), Petrus (B), Jesus, Knecht (T)			Derselbige Jünger war dem Hohenpriester bekannt	John 18:15b–23	Bc	G minor A minor	common time	Continuo in Measure 20 changed.
11		15			Chorus	Wer hat dich so geschlagen	Paul Gerhardt	2Ft 2Ob 2Vn Va Bc	A major	common time	
12	a	16	Ev			Und Hannas sandte ihn gebunden	John 18:24–27; Matthew 26:75	Bc	A Mixolydian mode	common time	
12	b	17	Chorus			Bist du nicht seiner Jünger einer	John 18:24–27; Matthew 26:75	2Ft 2Ob 2Vn Va Bc	A Mixolydian mode	common time	
12	c	18	Ev, Petrus, Knecht			Er leugnete aber und sprach	John 18:24–27; Matthew 26:75	Bc	A Mixolydian mode B minor	common time	
13		19		Aria Tenor		Ach, mein Sinn	Christian Weise	2Vn Va Bc	F♯ minor	3/4	
14		20			Chorus	Petrus, der nicht denkt zurück	Paul Stockmann	2Ft 2Ob 2Vn Va Bc	A major	common time	15

===== Part II =====
NBA		BWV	Bible	Reflection	Chorale	Beginning of text	Source	Instruments	Key	Time	Symmetry	
15		21			Chorus	Christus, der uns selig macht	Michael Weiße	2Ft 2Ob 2Vn Va Bc	E Phrygian mode	common time	14	
16	a	22	Ev, Pilate (B)			Da führeten sie Jesum	John 18:28–36	Bc	A minor	common time		
16	b	23	Chorus			Wäre dieser nicht ein Übeltäter	John 18:28–36	2Ft 2Ob 2Vn Va Bc	D Dorian mode	common time		
16	c	24	Ev, Pilate			Da sprach Pilatus zu ihnen	John 18:28–36	Bc	D Dorian mode	common time		
16	d	25	Chorus			Wir dürfen niemand töten	John 18:28–36	2Ft 2Ob 2Vn Va Bc	A minor	common time		
16	e	26	Ev, Pilate, Jesus			Auf daß erfüllet würde das Wort	John 18:28–36	Bc	A minor	common time		
17		27			Chorus	Ach großer König	Johann Heermann	2Ft 2Ob 2Vn Va Bc	A minor	common time		
18	a	28	Ev, Pilate, Jesus			Da sprach Pilatus zu ihm	John 18:37–40; John 19:1	Bc	C major	common time		
18	b	29	Chorus			Nicht diesen, sondern Barrabam	John 18:37–40; John 19:1	2Ft 2Ob 2Vn Va Bc	D Dorian mode	common time		
18	c	30	Ev			Barrabas aber war ein Mörder	John 18:37–40; John 19:1	Bc	D Dorian mode	common time		
19		31		Arioso Bass		Betrachte, meine Seel'	Brockes; Christian Heinrich Postel	2Vn con sordini Bc with Harpsichord	E♭ major	common time	Text for middle section altered.	
20		32		Aria Tenor		Mein Jesu, ach! dein schmerzhaft bitter Leiden	Anonymous	2Vn con sordini Bc (most likely only Cello or Vg and Keyboard)	C minor	12/8		
21	a	33	Ev			Und die Kriegsknechte flochten eine Krone	John 19:2–12a	Bc	G minor	common time		
21	b	34	Chorus			Sei gegrüßet, lieber Jüdenkönig	John 19:2–12a	2Ft 2Ob 2Vn Va Bc	B♭ major	6/4	25 b	1Vn each doubles wind parts.
21	c	35	Ev, Pilate			Und gaben ihm Backenstreiche	John 19:2–12a	Bc	G minor	common time		
21	d	36	Chorus			Kreuzige, kreuzige	John 19:2–12a	2Ft 2Ob 2Vn Va Bc	G minor	common time	23 d	
21	e	37	Ev, Pilate			Pilatus sprach zu ihnen	John 19:2–12a	Bc	G minor	common time		
21	f	38	Chorus			Wir haben ein Gesetz	John 19:2–12a	2Ft 2Ob 2Vn Va Bc	F major	common time	23 b	
21	g	39	Ev, Pilate, Jesus			Da Pilatus das Wort hörete	John 19:2–12a	Bc	E Phrygian mode	common time	23 a	
22		40			Chorus	Durch dein Gefängnis, Gottes Sohn	Christian Heinrich Postel; Melody Johann Hermann Schein	2Ft 2Ob 2Vn Va Bc	E major	common time	center	
23	a	41	Ev			Die Jüden aber schrieen und sprachen	John 19:12b–17	Bc	E major	common time	21 g	
23	b	42	Chorus			Lässest du diesen los	John 19:12b–17	2Ft 1Ob 1 Oboe d'amore 2Vn Va Bc	E major	common time	21 f	
23	c	43	Ev, Pilate			Da Pilatus das Wort hörete	John 19:12b–17	Bc	E major	common time		
23	d	44	Chorus			Weg, weg mit dem	John 19:12b–17	2Ft 1Ob 1Oa 2Vn Va Bc	F♯ minor	common time	21 d	
23	e	45	Ev, Pilate			Spricht Pilatus zu ihnen	John 19:12b–17	Bc	F♯ minor B minor	common time		
23	f	46	Chorus			Wir haben keinen König	John 19:12b–17	2Ft 1Ob 1Oa 2Vn Va Bc	B minor	common time		
23	g	47	Ev			Da überantwortete er ihn	John 19:12b–17	Bc	B minor	common time		
24		48		Aria Bass	Soprano; Alto; Tenor	Eilt, ihr angefochtnen Seelen	Brockes	2Vn Va Bc	G minor	3/8		
25	a	49	Ev			Allda kreuzigten sie ihn	John 19:18–22	Bc	F Mixolydian mode	common time		
25	b	50	Chorus			Schreibe nicht: der Jüden König	John 19:18–22	2Ft 2Ob 2Vn Va Bc	B♭ major	6/4	21 b	1Vn each doubles wind parts.
25	c	51	Ev, Pilate			Pilatus antwortet	John 19:18–22	Bc	B♭ major	common time		
26		52			Chorus	In meines Herzens Grunde	Valerius Herberger	2Ft 2Ob 2Vn Va Bc	E♭ major	common time		
27	a	53	Ev			Die Kriegsknechte aber	John 19:23–27a	Bc	F Mixolydian mode	common time		
27	b	54	Chorus			Lasset uns den nicht zerteilen	John 19:23–27a	2Ft 1Ob 1Oba 2Vn Va Bc	C major	3/4		
27	c	55	Ev, Jesus			Auf daß erfüllet würde die Schrift	John 19:23–27a	Bc	A minor	common time	Adagio for "Sie haben meine Kleider"	
28		56			Chorus	Er nahm alles wohl in acht	Paul Stockmann	2Ft 2Ob 2Vn Va Bc	A major	common time		
29		57	Ev, Jesus			Und von Stund an nahm sie der Jünger	John 19:27b–30a	Bc	D major	common time		
30		58		Aria Alto		Es ist vollbracht	Christian Heinrich Postel	Vg 2Vn Va Bc	B minor D major	3/4	Middle section: Vg doubles Alto (8vb).	
31		59	Ev			Und neiget das Haupt	John 19:30b	Bc	F♯ Phrygian mode	common time		
32		60		Aria Bass	Chorus	Mein teurer Heiland, laß dich fragen	Brockes; Paul Stockmann	2Vn Va Bc	D major	12/8		
33		61	Ev			Und siehe da, der Vorhang im Tempel zerriß	Matthew 27:51–52	Bc	E Dorian mode	common time		
34		62		Arioso Tenor		Mein Herz, in dem die ganze Welt	Brockes	2Ft 2Oa 2Vn Va Bc	G major	common time		
35		63		Aria soprano		Zerfließe, mein Herze	Brockes	1Ft + 1Vn con sordino 1Oc Bc	F Dorian mode	3/8		
36		64	Ev			Die Jüden aber, dieweil es der Rüsttag war	John 19:31–37	Bc	C Dorian mode	common time		
37		65			Chorus	O hilf, Christe, Gottes Sohn	Michael Weiße	2Ft 2Ob 2Vn Va Bc	B♭ Dorian mode	common time		
38		66	Ev			Darnach bat Pilatum Joseph von Arimathia	John 19:38–42	Bc	C Dorian mode	common time		
39		67		Chorus		Ruht wohl, ihr heiligen Gebeine	Brockes	2Ft 2Ob 2Vn Va Bc	C Dorian mode	3/4		
40		68			Chorus	Ach Herr, laß dein lieb Engelein	Martin Schalling	2Ft 2Ob 2Vn Va Bc	E♭ major	common time		

== Sources ==
=== Scores ===
- Johannespassion: Scores at the International Music Score Library Project
- "St. John passion (first version) BWV 245; BC D 2a". Leipzig University. 1973.
- "St. John passion (second version) BWV 245; BC D 2b". Leipzig University. 1973.
- "St. John passion (third version) BWV 245; BC D 2c". Leipzig University. 1973.
- "St. John passion (fourth version) BWV 245; BC D 2d". Leipzig University. 1973.
- "St. John passion (standard version) BWV 245; BC D 2e". Leipzig University. 1973.
- "Johannespassion, BWV 245 (Johann Sebastian Bach)". CPDL Free Choral Sheet Music.
- "Johannespassion Version II, BWV 245 (Johann Sebastian Bach)". Carus-Verlag.
- "Johannespassion Version IV, BWV 245 (Johann Sebastian Bach)". Carus-Verlag.
- "Johannespassion (Traditional Version), BWV 245 (Johann Sebastian Bach)". Carus-Verlag.

=== Books ===
- Chafe, Eric T. (1989). Franklin, Don O. (ed.). The St John Passion: theology and musical structure, in: Bach Studies, Volume 1. CUP Archive. ISBN 0-52-134105-1.
- Dürr, Alfred (1999). Johann Sebastian Bach, Die Johannes-Passion / Entstehung, Überlieferung, Werkeinführung (in German). Bärenreiter. ISBN 3-7618-1473-9.
- Steinberg, Michael (2005). Saint John Passion, in:Choral Masterworks: A Listener's Guide. Oxford University Press. ISBN 0-19-802921-7.

=== Online sources ===
- Ambrose, Z. Philip (2012). "BWV 245 Johannes-Passion". University of Vermont.
- Bischof, Walter F. (2012). "BWV 245 Johannes-Passion". University of Alberta.
- Braatz, Thomas; Oron, Aryeh (2006). "Chorale Melodies used in Bach's Vocal Works / Machs mit mir, Gott, nach deiner Güt". Bach Cantatas Website.
- Browne, Francis (2006). "Durch dein Gefängnis, Gottes Sohn / Text and Translation of Chorale". Bach Cantatas Website.
- Dahn, Luke (2018). "BWV 245.14". bach-chorales.com.
- Dahn, Luke (2018). "BWV 245.28". bach-chorales.com.
- Dahn, Luke (2018). "BWV 245.32". bach-chorales.com.
- Johnston, Blair (2014). "Johann Sebastian Bach / St. John Passion (Johannespassion), BWV 245 (BC D2)". Allmusic.
- Laffin, Frank (2007). "J. S. Bach: Johannes-Passion – Eine musikalische Analyse" (PDF) (in German). gemeindemusikschule.de. Archived from the original (PDF) on 2014-10-21.
- Oron, Aryeh (2011). "Johannes-Passion BWV 245". Bach Cantatas Website.
- Wolff, Christoph (2012). "Bach: St John Passion" (PDF). Hyperion Records.
- Wong, Audrey (2004). "St. John Passion". Bach Cantatas Website.
