= Sieg der Schönheit =

- Comic opera by Georg Philipp Telemann
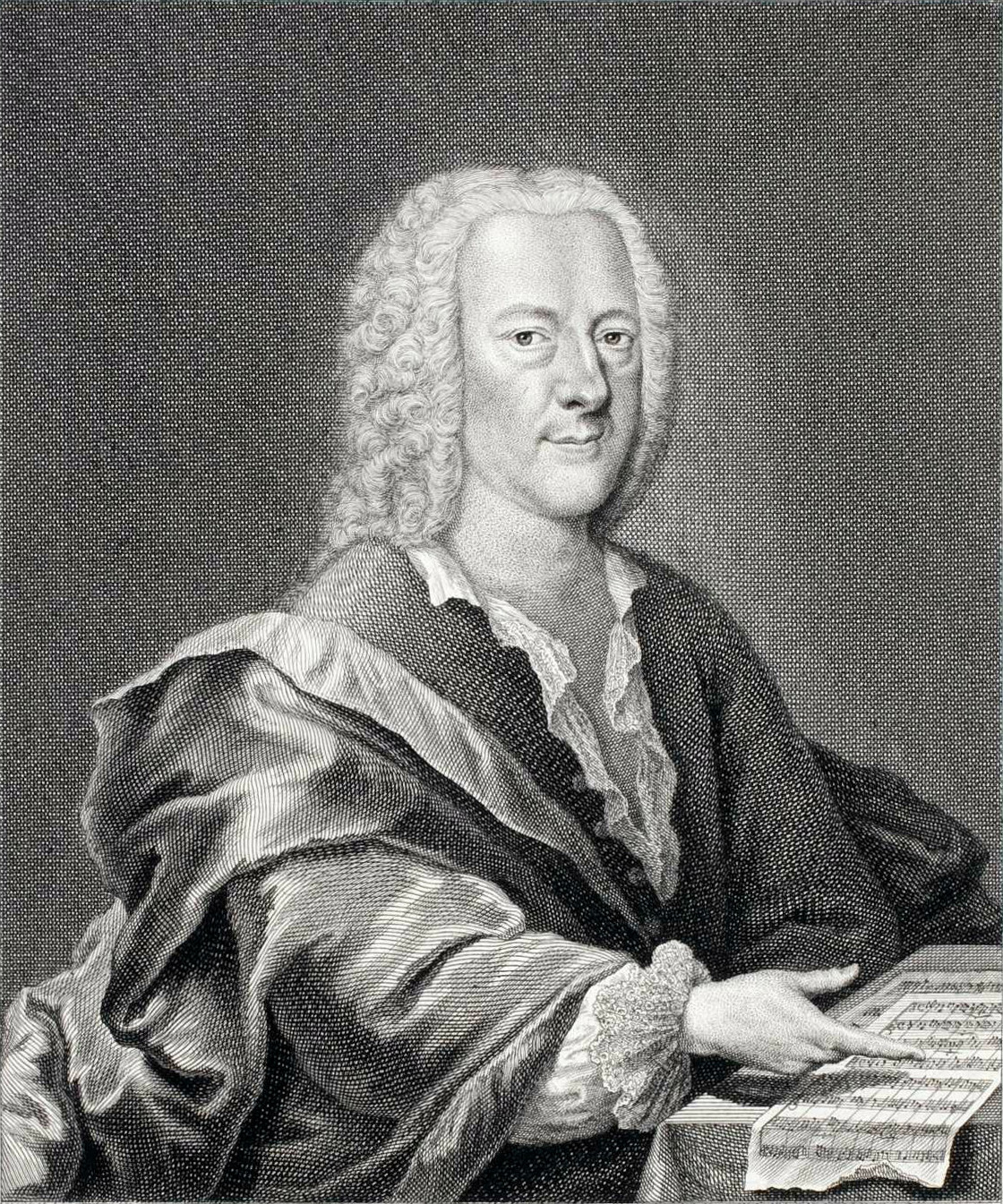
- The composer, c. 1745
- Translation: Victory of Beauty
- Librettist: Christian Heinrich Postel
- Language: German
- Based on: Roman history
- Premiere: 1722? Oper am Gänsemarkt, Hamburg

Gensericus oder Sieg der Schönheit TVWV 21:10 (Hamburg 1722 and Braunschweig) is a comic German-language opera in three acts by Georg Philipp Telemann. It was performed at the Oper am Gänsemarkt, while Keiser was director. Unlike Orpheus and Flavius Bertaridus, the opera contains no Italian-language set piece arias. The librettist was Christian Heinrich Postel.

The opera incurred the criticism of Johann Mattheson. Modern performances include a performance directed by Michael Schneider at the Theater Osnabrück in June 2012.

== Plot ==
The opera is set at the time of the second sack of Rome in 455AD. The Vandal prince Genseric has conquered Rome (historically following the murder of the emperor Valentinian III commissioned by the usurper Petronius Maximus) and now wants to conquer the Roman emperor's widow Eudoxia (historically Licinia Eudoxia), while his son Honoricus (historically Huneric) sets his eye on Eudoxia's daughter Pulcheria. The Vandal prince Helmige has no interest in the affections of the Roman servant Melita, but instead pursues Placida, who is already engaged to the Roman Olybrius.

== Edition ==
- Sieg der Schönheit, TVWV 21:10, Singspiel in drei Akten, Hamburg 1722. Braunschweiger Bearbeitung 1728 – Ariensammlung, ed. Hirschmann, Wolfgang BA 5865 Band 42
