= Jesu Leiden, Pein und Tod =

1633 Lutheran Passion hymn

- Lutheran Passion hymn
- Catalogue: Zahn 6288
- Text: by Paul Stockmann
- Language: German
- Melody: by Melchior Vulpius
- Published: 1633

"Jesu Leiden, Pein und Tod" (Suffering, pain and death of Jesus) is a German Lutheran hymn by Paul Stockmann. Written in 34 stanzas and published in 1633, it narrates the Passion of Jesus. It was sung to a melody by Melchior Vulpius. Johann Sebastian Bach used three of its stanzas as chorales in his St John Passion.

== History ==
Paul Stockmann wrote 34 stanzas of eight lines each, rhyming ABABCDCD. The hymn first appeared in 1633, designated to be sung to the 1609 melody by Melchior Vulpius to the Passion hymn "Jesu Kreuz, Leiden und Pein", Zahn No. 6288. The stanzas are usually in two halves, four lines describing the situation, and four lines applying it to the situation of the singer.

== Melody and musical settings ==
Johann Sebastian Bach used the 33rd stanza, "Jesu, deine Passion / ist mir lauter Freude" (Jesus, Your passion / is pure joy to me), in his cantata for Palm Sunday, Himmelskönig, sei willkommen, BWV 182, in 1714. In 1724, Bach used three stanzas from the hymn (10, 20, and 34) as commenting chorales in his St John Passion. The tenth stanza is sung as movement 14, ending Part I after Peter's denial, beginning "Petrus, der nicht denkt zurück" (Peter, when he fails to think). The 20th stanza follows Jesus telling his mother and John the disciple to take care of each other, beginning "Er nahm alles wohl in acht" (He took good care of everything) as movement 28. The final stanza (transcribed below), beginning "Jesu, der du warest tot /lebest nun ohn Ende" (Jesus who you were dead / live now without end), is used in movement 32 juxtaposed to lines of a bass aria, occurring in the narrative shortly after the death of Jesus. It is a prayer to Jesus whom the believer addresses as risen.

Johann Caspar Vogler probably composed a chorale prelude for the hymn, which was attributed to Bach.
