= Christian Weise =

German writer (1642–1708)

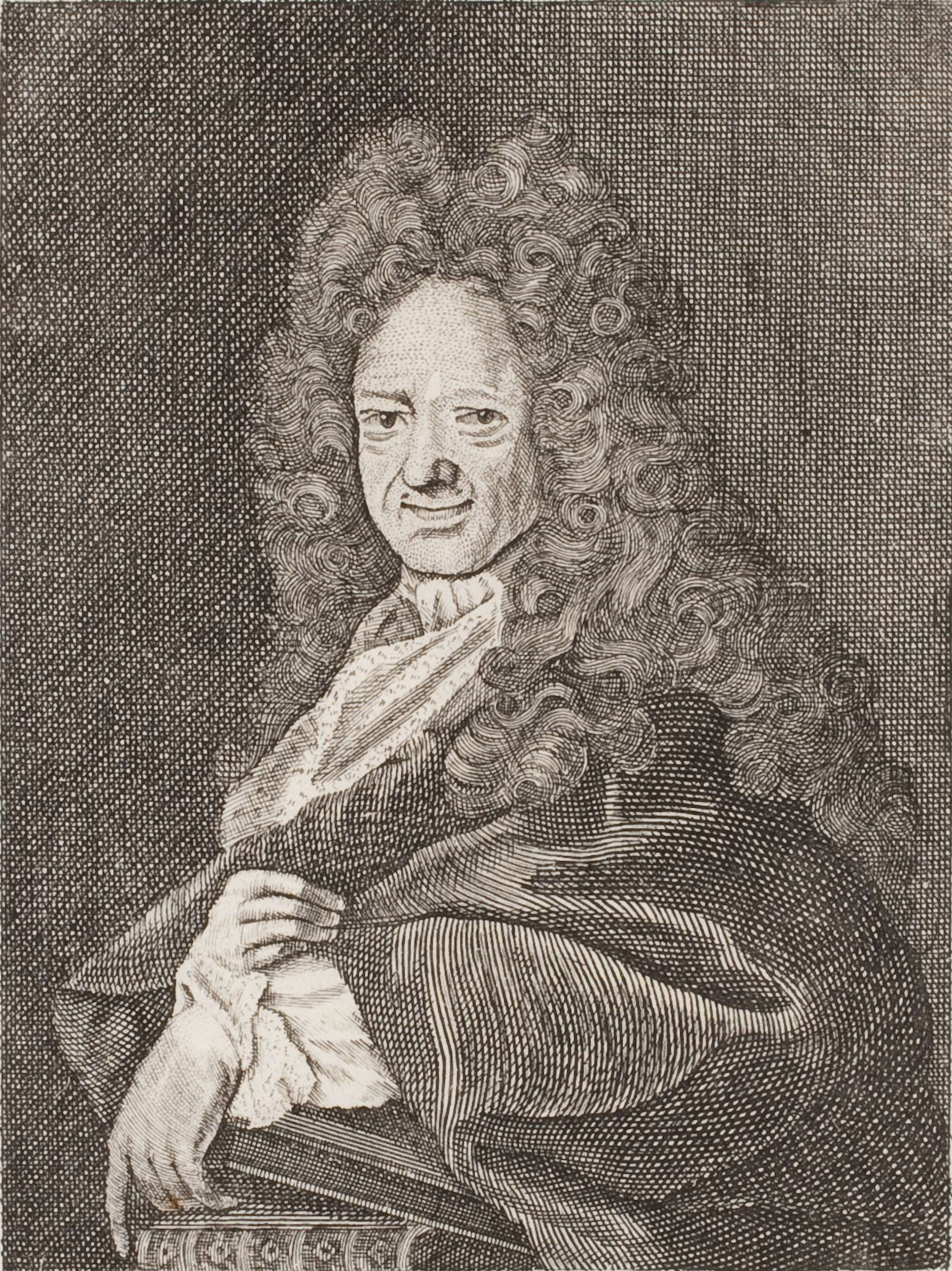
- Portrait of Weise
- Born: 30 April 1642; Zittau
- Died: 21 October 1708 (aged 66); Zittau
- Occupations: Writer; Dramatist; Pedagogue

Christian Weise (30 April 1642 – 21 October 1708), also known under the pseudonyms Siegmund Gleichviel, Orontes, Catharinus Civilis and Tarquinius Eatullus, was a German writer, dramatist, poet, pedagogue and librarian of the Baroque era. He produced a large number of dramatic works, noted for their social criticism and idiomatic style. In the 1670s he started a fashion for German "political novels". He has also been credited with the invention of the mathematical Euler diagram, though this is uncertain.

== Biography ==
Christian Weise was born in Zittau, the son of Elias Weise, a magister tertium or assistant teacher. Weise studied theology at the University of Leipzig, gaining a Magister's degree in 1663. His studies expanded into rhetoric, politics, history and poetry, and for a brief period after his graduation he lectured there in those subjects. However, in 1668 he secured a post at the court in Halle, as the secretary of Simon Philipp von Leiningen-Westerburg, the minister of Augustus, Duke of Saxe-Weissenfels. In 1670 Weise became Hofmeister for Gustav Adolf von der Schulenburg, the Baron of Emden. However, later that same year he moved again, to teach at a school in Weißenfels, the Gymnasium Illustre Augusteum.

During the 1670s Weise produced a number of innovatory political and satirical novels, starting with Die drey Haupt-Verderber in Teutschland (1671). These created a fashion for the German "political novel" which lasted into the next decade, in particular in the political novels of Johann Beer. As Weise had done earlier, Beer worked at the court of Duke Augustus; he followed the court from Halle to Weißenfels when it moved in 1680.

In 1678, however, Weise left Weißenfels to become rector (headmaster) of the gymnasium in Zittau, and also took the position of city librarian there. During his time at the Gymnasium he wrote up to 60 dramatic works, which were staged by his pupils. He intended the moral and political lessons contained in the works to be of practical educational benefit. As well as continuing the German school drama tradition, he continued the tradition of Protestant biblical drama, with works such as Jephtha (1679) and Abraham (1680). His dramas often contained interspersed music; there are complete scores for the latter two biblical works, by Moritz Edelmann, who also provided music for the comedy Der baürischer Machiavellus (1679). Weise also wrote tragedies, including one of his best known works, Masaniello (1682). He satirized the social and political ills of the time, criticizing the higher levels of society from the viewpoint of those lower down. Unusually for a writer of the Baroque era, he employed an exceptionally sober and realistic style. His comedies, written in the dialects of Upper Lusatia and North Bohemia, gave a sympathetic portrayal of common people.

By the end of the century, he introduced German as the school's language of instruction. In 1708 he gave up his position as Rektor due to failing eyesight, and died in Zittau the same year. The modern successor to his school is called the Christian-Weise-Gymnasium.

During his time as librarian at Zittau's Ratsbibliothek, he made substantial additions to the library's collections. These are held by Zittau's modern library, which was named the Christian-Weise-Bibliothek in 1954. In the 1950s a revival of his tragedy Masaniello was also staged in Zittau.

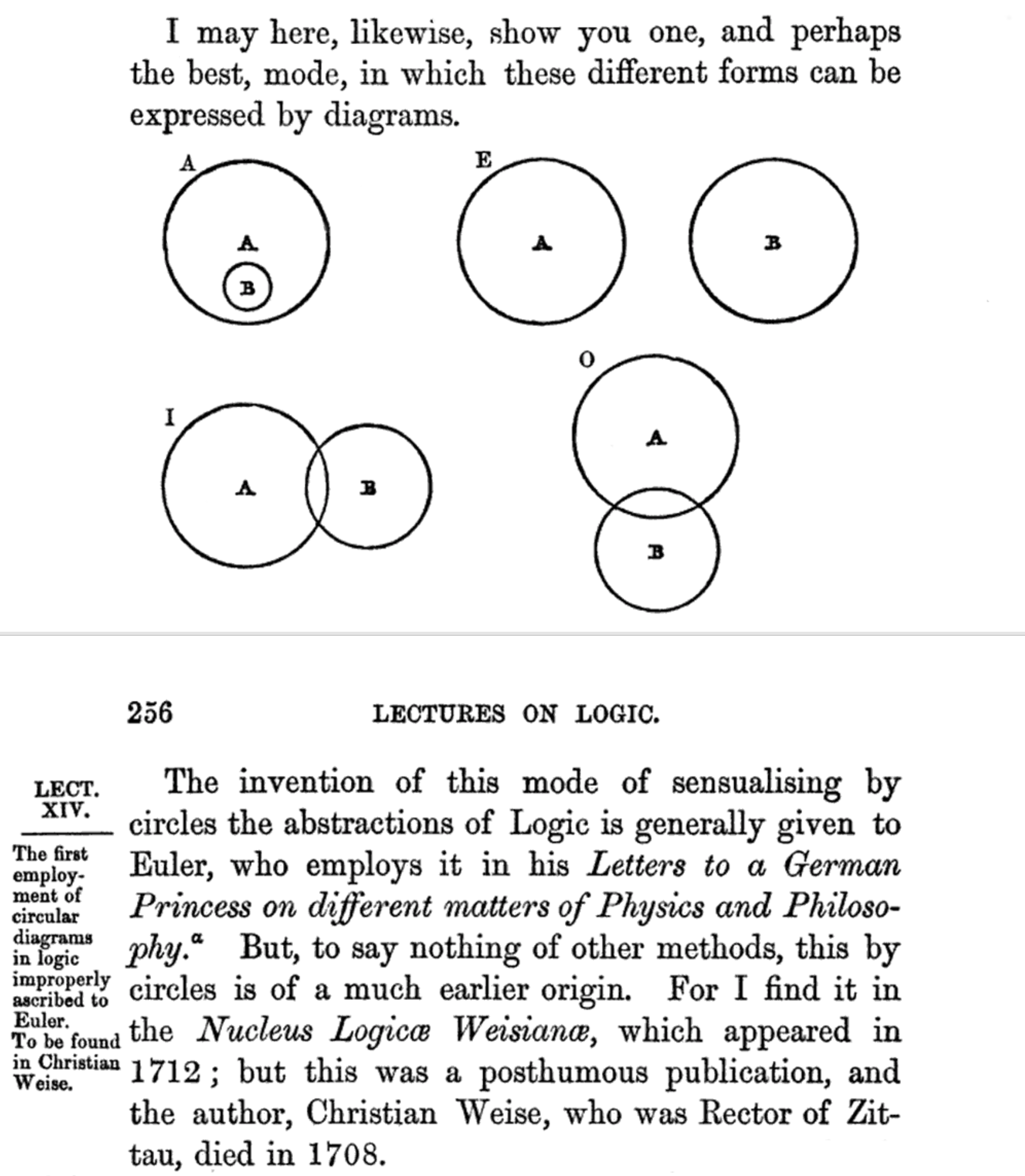
"Eulerian circles", attributed to Weise in William Hamilton's Lectures on Metaphysics and Logic (1860)

In the field of logic, Weise has been credited with the first use of circles in diagrams showing logical relationships between mathematical sets. The technique, now known as the Euler diagram, was the precursor of the Venn diagram. The circles appeared in Nucleus Logicae Weisianae (1712), a treatise written by Johann Christian Lange describing Weise's contributions to logic. However, the mathematician John Venn argued that the circles were illustrations devised by Lange.

Johann Sebastian Bach used an adaptation of the first stanza of Weise's poem Der weinende Petrus for the text of the aria "Ach, mein Sinn" in the St John Passion. Weise presented the poem in Der grünen Jugend nothwendige Gedancken (1675), as a demonstration of writing strophic poetry for existing music, namely a lost work by Sebastian Knüpfer.

== Works ==
Selected works include:

=== Drama ===
- Die triumphirende Keuschheit (1668), comedy
- Der baürischer Machiavellus (1679), comedy
- Jephtha (1679), biblical drama
- Abraham (1680), biblical drama
- Masaniello (1682), tragedy
- Von Tobias und der Schwalbe (1682), comedy
- Der verfolgte Lateiner (1696)

=== Poetry ===
- Der grünen Jugend uberflüssige Gedancken (1668)
- Der grünen Jugend nothwendige Gedancken (1675)
- Zittauer Fastentuch (1672)

=== Novels ===
- Die drey Haupt-Verderber in Teutschland (1671)
- Die drey ärgsten Ertz-Narren in der gantzen Welt (1672)
- Die drey klügsten Leute in der gantzen Welt (1675)
- Der politische Redner (1677)
- Der politische Näscher (1678)
- Neu-erleuterter politischer Redner (1684)

=== Other writings ===
- De poesi hodiernorum politicorum (1678)
- Politische Fragen (1690)
- Curiöse Gedancken von deutschen Brieffen (1691)
- Curiöse Gedancken von deutschen Versen (1692)
- Curiöse Gedancken von Wolcken-Brüchen (1701)
- Epistolae selectiores (1716)

== Sources ==
- Aikin, Judith P (1989). Scaramutza in Germany : the Dramatic Works of Caspar Stieler. Pennsylvania State University. ISBN 0-271-00656-0.
- Dreyfus, Laurence (2011). "The Triumph of 'Instrumental Melody': Aspects of Musical Poetics in Bach's St John Passion". In Melamed, Daniel R (ed.). Bach Perspectives, Volume 8: J. S. Bach and the Oratorio Tradition. University of Illinois Press. ISBN 978-0-252-03584-5.
- Dürr, Alfred (2002). Johann Sebastian Bach's St John Passion: Genesis, Transmission and Meaning. Oxford: Oxford University Press. ISBN 0-19-816240-5.
- Hamilton, William (1860). "Lecture 14". In Mansel, Henry L; Veitch, John (eds.). Lectures on Metaphysics and Logic, Volume 2: Logic. Boston: Gould and Lincoln.
- Hardin, James (1998). "Introduction". In Russell, John R (ed.). German Winter Nights. Columbia, SC: Camden House. ISBN 1-57113-195-7.
- Rae, Ian D (1997). "Loschmidt and Venn: Symbolic Logic in Chemistry and Mathematics". In Fleischhacker, Wilhelm; Schönfeld, Thomas (eds.). Pioneering Ideas for the Physical and Chemical Sciences: Josef Loschmidt's Contributions and Modern Developments in Structural Organic Chemistry, Atomistics and Statistical Mechanics. New York: Plenum. ISBN 0-306-45684-2.
- Watanabe-O'Kelly, Helen (2000). "The early modern period (1450–1720)". In Watanabe-O'Kelly, Helen (ed.). The Cambridge History of German Literature. Cambridge: Cambridge University Press. ISBN 0-521-78573-1.
