= Michael Weiße =

German theologian and hymn writer

- Born: c. 1488; Neiße
- Died: 19 March 1534 (aged 46); Landskron
- Other names: Michael Weisse
- Occupations: Theologian; Hymn writer
- Organization: Unity of the Brethren

Michael Weiße or Weisse (c. 1488 – 19 March 1534) was a German theologian, Protestant reformer and hymn writer. First a Franciscan, he joined the Bohemian Brethren. He published the most extensive early Protestant hymnal in 1531, supplying most hymn texts and some tunes himself. One of his hymns was used in Johann Sebastian Bach's St John Passion.

== Career ==
Weiße was born in Neiße (now Nysa, Poland) and attended the Pfarrgymnasium (pastoral school) there. From 1504, he studied at the University of Cracow and became a Franciscan friar in Breslau (now Wrocław, Poland) in 1510. He and colleagues Johannes Zeising and Johann Mönch converted to the teaching of Martin Luther, and were expelled from Breslau around 1517. In 1518 they were admitted to the Bohemian Brethren.

Weiße was elected as Prediger (preacher) and Vorsteher (leader) of the German community of brethren in Landskron in 1522. The same year he was sent as part of a delegation to Wittenberg, to compare the Brethren's creed with that of Martin Luther. From 1525, Weiße, Zeising and Mönch favoured and promoted the teaching of Ulrich Zwingli, which caused conflict with the bishop of Prague. While Weiße and Mönch submitted to the bishop, Zeising joined the Anabaptists and was burned in Brünn in 1528 on a decree of the Holy Roman Emperor Ferdinand I.

In 1531, Weiße was ordained as a priest of the Unity of the Brethren on a synod in Brandeis, and at the same time made Vorsteher of the German congregations in Landskron and Fulnek. He died in Landskron in 1534.

== Works ==
Weiße wrote theological tracts and hymn lyrics, which he partially set to music himself. He published in 1531 the hymnal of the Brethren, Ein New Gesengbuchlein (A new little hymnal), in Jungbunzlau in 1531. The first hymnal of the Brethren in German contained 157 hymns, 137 written or adapted by Weiße, on melodies mostly from the Bohemian tradition of the Brethren. Then the most extensive Protestant hymnal, it influenced other collections. It was the first hymnal structured by topics, eight sections for times of the liturgical year, praise, prayer, teaching ("Leergeseng"), times of the day, children, penitence, funeral ("Zum begrebnis d Todte"), last judgement ("Vom jüngsten Tag"), saints ("Von den rechten heiligen") and testament ("Von dem Testament des herren").

One of Weiße's hymns was used in Bach's St John Passion. Part II and the third scene, of the court hearing, is opened by the first stanza of a hymn for Passiontide, "Christus, der uns selig macht" (Christ, who hath us blessed made), summarizing what Jesus has to endure although innocent ("made captive, ... falsely indicted, and mocked and scorned and bespat"). The scene of the crucifixion ends with stanza 8 of this hymn, "O hilf, Christ, Gottes Sohn" (O help, Christ, O Son of God). Seven of the eight stanzas of this hymn are also used in the mid-18th-century pasticcio Passion oratorio Wer ist der, so von Edom kömmt (movements 2, 24, 27, 30, 38, 40 and 42). Mauricio Kagel quoted the hymn, paraphrased to "Bach, der uns selig macht" in his oratorio Sankt-Bach-Passion telling Bach's life, composed for the tricentenary of Bach's birth in 1985.

Eight hymns by Weiße are part of the current German Protestant hymnal Evangelisches Gesangbuch (EG), including his Easter hymn "Gelobt sei Gott im höchsten Thron". His hymnal was reprinted by Konrad Ameln in 1957 as a facsimile, titled Gesangbuch der Böhmischen Brüder 1531 (Hymnal of the Bohemien Brethren 1531). A digitized edition from Nuremeburg, 1544, is accessible on e-rara.

== Literature ==
- Petr Hlaváček: Die Franziskaner-Observanten zwischen böhmischer und europäischer Reformation. In: Winfried Eberhard und Franz Machilek (ed.): Kirchliche Reformimpulse des 14./14. Jahrhunderts in Ostmitteleuropa. Böhlau-Verlag 2006, ISBN 978-3-412-26105-4, pp.321f.
- Michael Weiße. In: Biographisch-Bibliographisches Kirchenlexikon (BBKL).
- S. Fornagon. Michael Weiße. Jahrbuch für Schlesische Kirche und Kirchengeschichte. NF 33, 1954, pp. 34–44.
- Walther Killy: Killy Literaturlexikon: Autoren und Werke deutscher Sprache. 15 volumes. Bertelsmann, Gütersloh, München 1988–1991. CD-ROM: Berlin 1998, ISBN 3-932544-13-7.
- Andreas Marti: Weiße, Michael. In: Religion in Geschichte und Gegenwart. volume 8. 4th edition. 2005, p.1379.
