= Paul Stockmann =

German hymnwriter (1603–1636)

Paul or Paulus Stockmann (3 January 1603 – 6 September 1636) was a German academic, preacher and hymn-writer. He fought at the Battle of Lützen in 1632 and later served as court preacher to Gustavus Adolphus of Sweden, before dying of the plague in 1636.

Some of his hymns are included in the Danish hymnbook Psalmebog for Kirke og Hjem. Single stanzas of his hymn 1633 hymn "Jesu Leiden, Pein und Tod", a narration of the Passion in 34 stanzas, were set for four parts by Johann Sebastian Bach, as the closing chorale of cantata Sehet, wir gehn hinauf gen Jerusalem, BWV 159, a chorale of cantata Himmelskönig, sei willkommen, BWV 182, and three stanzas reflecting dramatic situations in the St John Passion.

== Sources ==
- Paul Stockmann (Hymn-Writer) Bach Cantatas Website
