= Christian Heinrich Postel =

German librettist and lawyer (1658–1705)

- Born: 11 October 1658; Freiburg an der Elbe
- Died: 22 March 1705 (aged 46); Hamburg
- Education: Johanneum; University of Leipzig; University of Rostock
- Occupations: Jurist; Librettist

Christian Heinrich Postel (11 October 1658 – 22 March 1705) was a German jurist, epic poet and opera librettist, who wrote 28 libretti for the Oper am Gänsemarkt in Hamburg: set by composers such as Johann Philipp Förtsch, Reinhard Keiser and Georg Philipp Telemann. His texts for a St John Passion were set by composers Christian Ritter, Johann Mattheson and Johann Sebastian Bach in their respective St John Passion.

== Career ==
Postel was born in Freiburg an der Elbe, the son of the theologian Lorenz Postel and his wife Dorothea, née Isentrut. His father was a minister at the Heiliggeistkirche in Hamburg. Christian Heinrich Postel attended the Gelehrtenschule des Johanneums. He studied law at the University of Leipzig from 1680 with Christian Thomasius. When the plague threatened Leipzig, he continued his studies at the University of Rostock, where he graduated as a licentiate on 10 May 1683. He travelled for six months with Jacob von Melle, a historian and theologian, in the Netherlands, England and France. Their diary of the journey, "Beschreibung einer Reise durch das nordwestliche Deutschland, nach den Niederlanden und England im Jahre 1683" (Description of a journey through the north-western Germany, to the Netherlands and England in the year 1683), not printed until the 19th century, shows their many interests, especially in foreign universities and libraries.

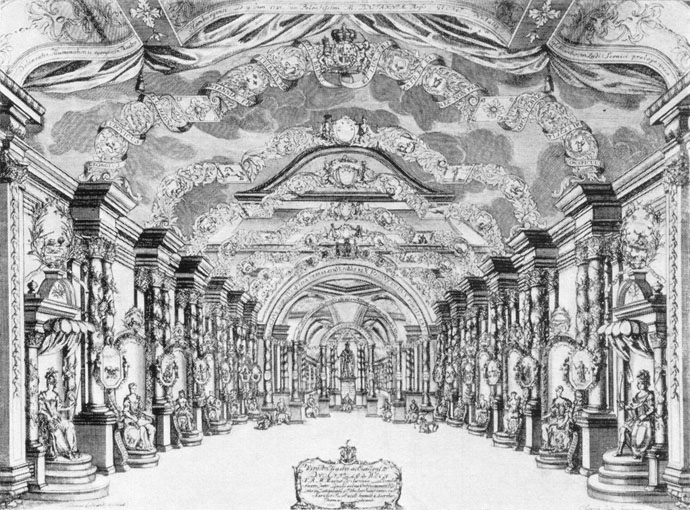
Oper am Gänsemarkt

Back in Hamburg, he opened an office as a lawyer. He wrote 28 opera libretti for the Oper am Gänsemarkt from 1688 to 1702, set by contemporary composers such as Johann Georg Conradi, Reinhard Keiser and Johann Sigismund Kusser. Georg Philipp Telemann set his libretto of Sieg der Schönheit (Victory of beauty). He adapted Jean Galbert de Campistron's tragedy Achille et Polyxène for an opera by Lully and Colasse, premiered in 1687, as a French-German cooperation unique in opera history. His opera libretto Die heilige Eugenia, oder die Bekehrung der Stadt Alexandria zum Christenthum ("St. Eugenia, or the conversion of Alexandria to Christianity"), was set by Johann Philipp Förtsch, premiered in 1688 and printed in 1695. In 1692, He was the librettist for an opera in two parts concerning the destruction of Jerusalem.

Around 1700, Postel wrote the libretto for an oratorio Leiden und sterben Jesu Christi (Passion and death of Jesus Christ, or St John Passion). A setting formerly attributed to George Frideric Handel is now believed to be by Christian Ritter. Another setting, called Das Lied des Lammes ("The Song of the Lamb") is by Johann Mattheson. Several parts of the text were used in Bach's St John Passion. While Postel is thought to have written all thirteen poetic pieces added to the Gospel text, it is certain only for three which were reprinted by Christian Friedrich Hunold, while "Durch dein Gefängnis, Gottes Sohn" is among the other ten. Ritter and Mattheson composed it as an aria, while Bach set it as a chorale on the melody of the hymn "Machs mit mir, Gott, nach deiner Güt" (Deal with me, God, according to your kindness). All three composers place it at the same position in the action, in the court hearing of Pilate.

Postel died in Hamburg of consumption.

== Selected works ==
- Jakob von Melle, Christian Henrich Postel: Beschreibung einer Reise durch das nordwestliche Deutschland, nach den Niederlanden und England im Jahre 1683. Aus einer Handschrift der Lübeckischen Stadtbibliothek herausgegeben von Oberlehrer Dr. Carl Curtius. Gebr. Borchers, Lübeck 1891 (Programm Lübeck Catharineum 1891), online.

== Literature ==
- Julius Elias: Postel, Christian Heinrich. In: Allgemeine Deutsche Biographie (ADB). Band 26, Duncker & Humblot, Leipzig 1888, S. 465–473.
- Dian Igor Lindberg: Literary Aspects of German Baroque Opera. History, theory, and practice (Christian Heinrich Postel and Barthold Feind). Diss. Univ. of California, Los Angeles 1964.
- Solveig Olsen: Christian Heinrich Postels Beitrag zur deutschen Literatur. Versuch einer Darstellung (= Amsterdamer Publikationen zur Sprache und Literatur 7, ISSN 0169-0221). Rodopi, Amsterdam 1973.
- Bodo Plachta: Postel, Christian Heinrich. In: Neue Deutsche Biographie (NDB). Band 20, Duncker & Humblot, Berlin 2001, S. 656 (Digitalisat).
- Erich Vilter: Die epische Technik in Chr. H. Postels Heldengedicht „Der grosse Wittekind“. Ein Beitrag zur Geschichte der Renaissanceepen. Kaestner, Göttingen 1899 (Dissertation, Universität Göttingen, 1898).
