= Brockes Passion (Handel) =

1712 sacred oratorio by Handel

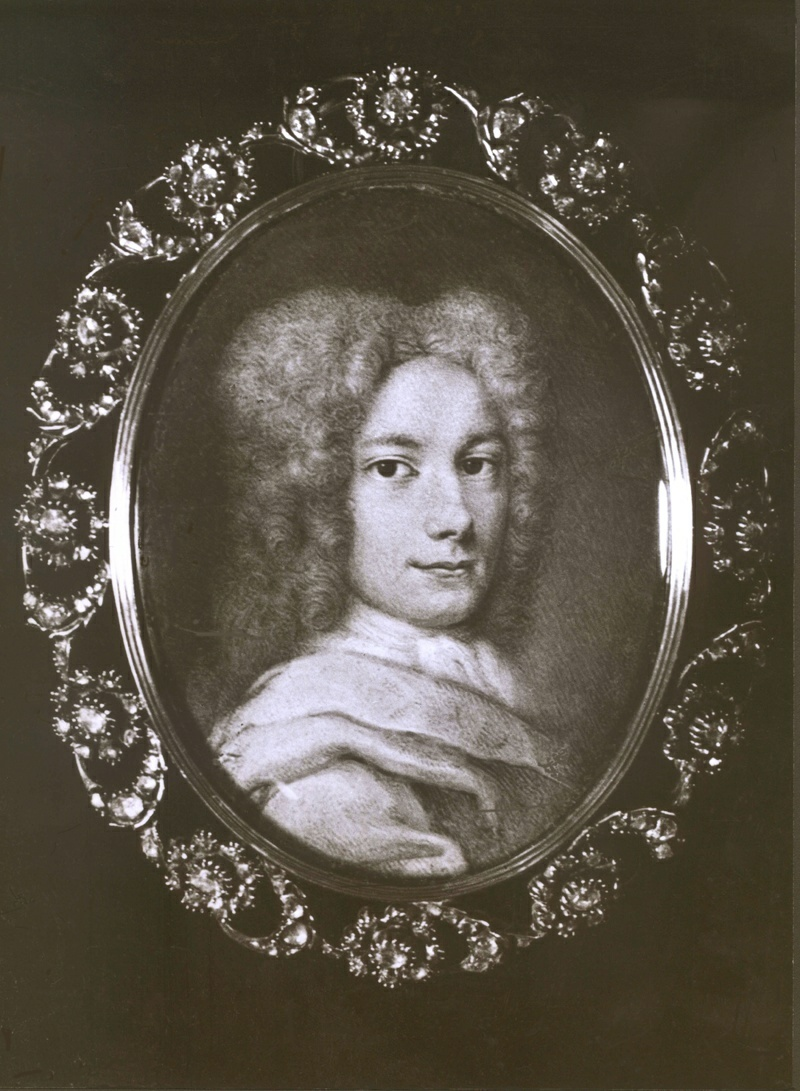
Händel c. 1710

The Brockes Passion, or Der für die Sünde der Welt gemarterte und sterbende Jesus (English: The Story of Jesus, Suffering and Dying for the Sins of the World), is a German oratorio, libretto by Barthold Heinrich Brockes, first published in 1712 and seeing 30 or so more editions over the following 15 years.

The most famous musical setting of Brockes' text is that by George Frideric Handel, HWV 48. The text was also set by Reinhard Keiser (1712), Georg Philipp Telemann (1716), Johann Mattheson (1718), Gottfried Heinrich Stölzel (1725), Johann Friedrich Fasch (1723) and several other composers.

== Brockes' text ==
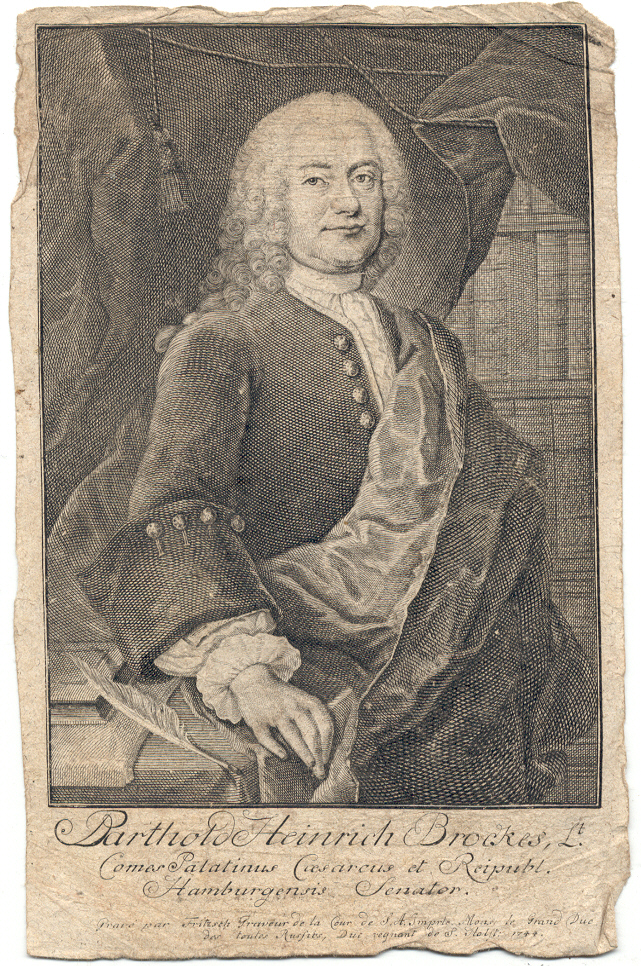
Engraved portrait of Brockes (1744) by Christian Fritsch (1704–1760)

Barthold Heinrich Brockes was an influential German poet who re-worked the traditional form of a Passion oratorio, adding reflective and descriptive poetry, sometimes of a highly-wrought and emotional kind, into the texture of his Passion. The Brockes Passion was much admired and set to music numerous times in Baroque Germany, although to other ages and in other countries some of Brockes' poetry has seemed in poor taste. In Brockes' version of a passion, a tenor Evangelist narrates, in recitative passages, events from all four Gospels' accounts of Jesus' suffering and death. Persons of the Gospel story (Jesus, Peter, Pilate, and so on) have dialogue passages, also in recitative; a chorus sings passages depicting the declamation of crowds; and poetic texts, sometimes in the form of arias, sometimes that of chorales, reflect on the events. Some of the arias are for the persons of the Passion, Jesus himself, Peter, etc., but Mary the mother of Jesus also has a singing part, and fictitious "characters", the Daughter of Zion, four solo Believing Souls, and A Chorus of Believing Souls, also observe and comment.

== Handel's setting ==
Since 1712 the German-born Handel had been resident in London. It is not known exactly why or when Handel set the text of the Brockes Passion, already used by numerous other composers, to music, but it is known that the work was performed in Hamburg in 1719.

Handel's Brockes Passion is "an entirely worthy contribution to the repertory of its genre." It is a lengthy and contemplative work for vocal soloists, choir and instrumental ensemble with some passages of great beauty, such as the duet for Mary and her son. The few choruses, perhaps surprisingly in view of Handel's later large scale choral works, are short and perfunctory in comparison with the arias, some of which are in an operatic style, others with simple accompaniment of solo oboe or obbligato violin.

Johann Sebastian Bach was influenced by the work in his St John Passion. In the last decade of his life Bach used seven arias of Handel's Brockes Passion in a St Mark Passion pastiche, and even performed it in his own arrangement in 1746.

== Recordings ==
- Edda Moser (soprano), Maria Stader (soprano), Jerry J. Jennings (tenor), Ernst Haefliger (tenor), Paul Esswood (alto), Theo Adam (bass-baritone), Jakob Stämpfli (bass), Schola Cantorum Basiliensis, Regensburg Cathedral Choir, August Wenzinger (conductor). Archiv Produktion SKL 959/61, released 1967
- Mária Zádori (soprano), Eva Bártfai-Barta (soprano), Katalin Farkas (soprano), Eva Lax (alto), Péter Baján (countertenor), Tamás Csányi (countertenor), Drew Minter (countertenor), János Bándi (tenor), Guy de Mey (tenor), Martin Klietmann (tenor), Gunter Burzynski (baritone), Capella Savaria, Hallé State Chorus, Nicholas McGegan (conductor). Hungaroton 12734/36, released 1995
- Nele Gramß (Daughter of Zion, soprano), Johanna Winkel (Believer, soprano), Elvira Bill (Maria, mezzo-soprano), Jan Thomer (altus, Judas), Markus Brutscher (Evangelist, tenor), James Oxley (Peter, tenor), Michael Dahmen (bass), Markus Flaig (Jesus, bass), Collegium Cartusianum, Kölner Kammerchor, Peter Neumann (conductor). Carus 83.428/00, released 2010
- Johannette Zomer (soprano), Ana Maria Labin (soprano), Sebastian Kohlhepp (tenor), Rupert Charlesworth (tenor), Tobias Berndt (baritone), David Erler (countertenor), NDR Chor - Bart Van Reyn (chorus master), FestspielOrchester Gottingen, Laurence Cummings (direction). Accent ACC26411, released 2019
- Robert Murray (tenor), Cody Quattlebaum (bass-baritone), Elizabeth Watts (soprano), Ruby Hughes (soprano), Tim Mead (countertenor), Gwilym Bowen (tenor), Nicky Spence (tenor) - Academy of Ancient Music, Richard Egarr. AAM Records AAM007, released 2019.
- Sandrine Piau (soprano), Stuart Jackson (tenor), Konstantin Krimmel (baritone), Arcangelo, Solisten des Vocal Consort, Jonathan Cohen (dir.). Alpha-Classics [ALPHA 644]. Recorded: 2019, October 9–13; St. Jude's Church, London, England. © 2020 Alpha Classics / Outhere Music France • 2020 Arcangelo & Alpha Classics / Outhere Music France.
