= St Mark Passion (attributed to Keiser) =

St Mark Passion

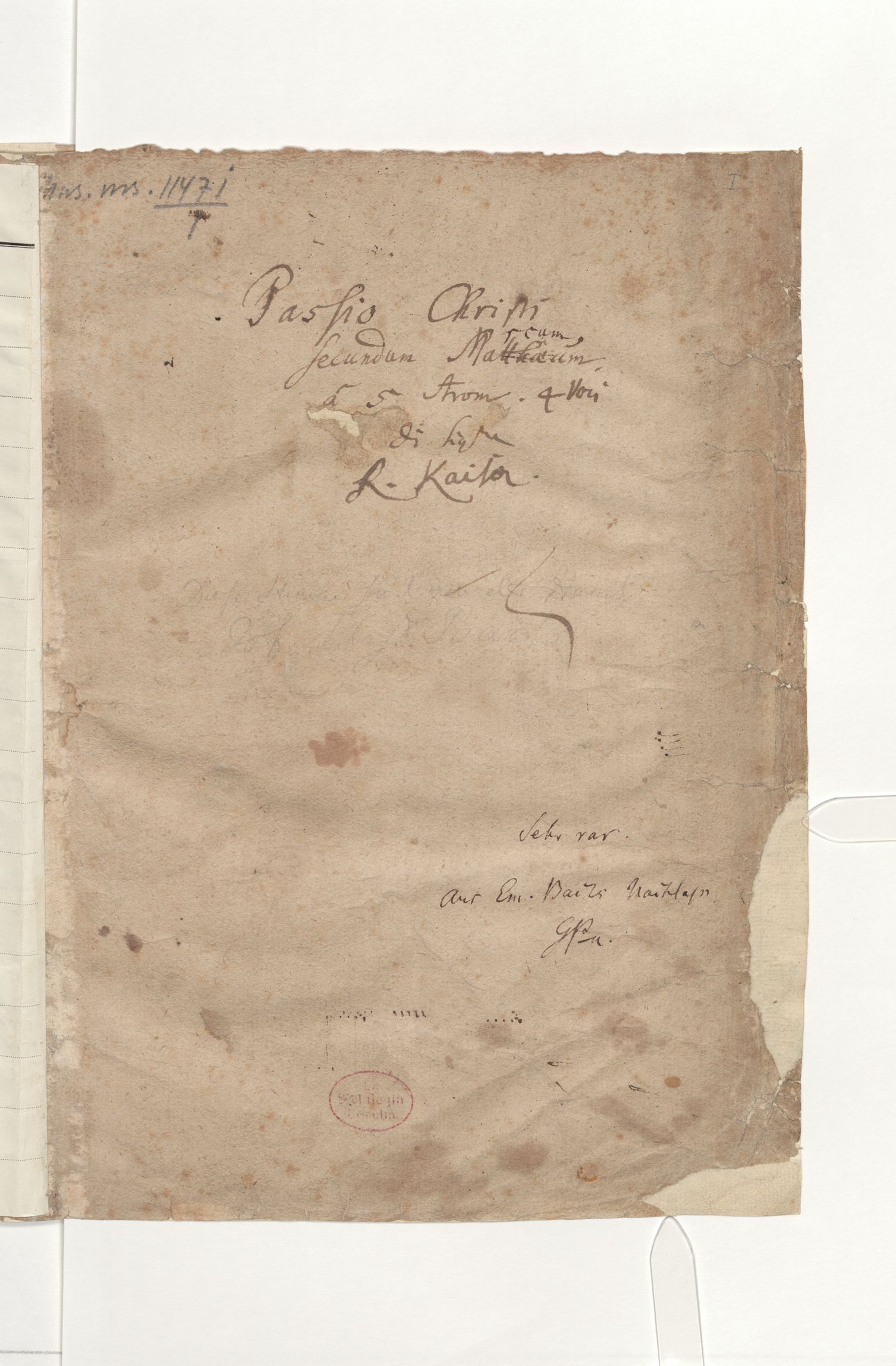
Cover page of D-B Mus. ms. 11471/1, a composite manuscript containing parts Johann Sebastian Bach used for his Weimar and first Leipzig performances of the "Keiser" St Mark Passion

Jesus Christus ist um unsrer Missetat willen verwundet is a St Mark Passion which originated in the early 18th century and is most often attributed to Reinhard Keiser. It may also have been composed by his father Gottfried or by Friedrich Nicolaus Bruhns. Johann Sebastian Bach produced three performance versions of the Passion, the last of which is a pasticcio with arias from George Frideric Handel's Brockes Passion. There are two other extant 18th-century versions of the Passion, both of them independent of Bach's versions. The Passion was performed in at least three cities in the first half of the 18th century: in Hamburg in 1707 and 1711, in Weimar around 1712, and in Leipzig in 1726 and around 1747.

== History ==
The passion was probably composed around 1705 by Gottfried Keiser, by his son Reinhard, or by Friedrich Nicolaus Bruhns. The 18th-century scores of the composition don't always indicate a composer, but the name of Reinhard Keiser or "Kaiser" is found there. The work can also be considered as an anonymous composition. The music of this passion is known from Bach's three versions, from an anonymous manuscript score that originated in or around Hamburg, and from another anonymous manuscript score that is conserved in the county of Hohenstein, Thuringia. No libretto author for the original work is known. Also for the later arrangements text authors are largely unknown, except for the pasticcio parts by Handel based on the Brockes Passion by Barthold Heinrich Brockes.

=== 1707–1714: Hamburg and Weimar ===
The oldest record of Jesus Christus ist um unsrer Missetat willen verwundet is a staging in the Cathedral (Dom) of Hamburg in 1707. Shortly before the end of the 20th century a printed libretto of that performance, and that of a repeat performance in 1711, were rediscovered. These performances were directed by Friedrich Nicolaus Bruhns (also spelled: Brauns), the music director of the Hamburg Cathedral from 1685 to 1718, hence the association of the Passion setting with this composer. Possibly the versions performed in Hamburg in 1707 and 1711 were adapted from an earlier lost version, maybe not even composed for Hamburg. The earliest extant copy of the music of the Passion was produced by Johann Sebastian Bach for performance in Weimar around 1712. Which model was used by Bach is not known: it may have differed from the scores used in Hamburg. Bach's adjustments to the score he had before him were probably minor.

The libretto has the Biblical text interspersed with free verse and chorale texts. The chorale texts are taken from "Was mein Gott will, das g'scheh allzeit" by Albert, Duke of Prussia (verse 1), "Christus, der uns selig macht" by Michael Weiße (Verse 8), "O Haupt voll Blut und Wunden" by Paul Gerhardt (verses 9 and 10), and "O Traurigkeit, o Herzeleid" by Johann Rist. Unlike Passions for instance written for Leipzig, there is no division of the work into two parts.

Voices:

- Evangelist: tenor
- Jesus: bass
- Peter: tenor
- Judas: alto
- High priest: alto
- Ancilla (maid): soprano
- Pilate: tenor
- Soldier: alto
- Centurion: alto
- Solo arias (and chorale No. 23 (42)) for soprano, for alto, for tenor and for bass
- Choir: SATB

Orchestra:

- Winds:
  - Oboes I (also used in No. 30) and II
- Strings:
  - Violins I and II
  - Violas I and II
- Basso continuo (bassoon; 2 cellos, bass; organ/harpsichord)

==== 1707/1711 Hamburg version ====
The original version of the Passion would have been composed around 1705. Its first Hamburg performance took place in the Cathedral in 1707, under the direction of Bruhns, who also conducted the Hamburg performance of 1711.

==== Bach's Weimar version ====
Bach's first version, BC 5a, originated in the early 1710s in Weimar. Whether he changed anything to the original is uncertain, but the arrangement of the "O hilf, Christe, Gottes Sohn" and "O Traurigkeit, o Herzeleid" chorales is usually attributed to him. Possibly he also composed the first "Symphonia" (No. 10 [18]), which is only found in Bach's versions.

=== Bach's Leipzig versions ===
Bach performed Jesus Christus ist um unsrer Missetat willen verwundet twice in a Good Friday service in Leipzig.

==== 1726 ====
Bach staged the passion in a new version, BC 5b, in 1726 in Leipzig. The order of service in Leipzig requested passions in two parts: apparently for this reason Bach added the chorale "So gehst du nun, mein Jesu", BWV 500a, as a conclusion for the first part. In this version he also slightly modified the "O hilf, Christe, Gottes Sohn" and "O Traurigkeit, o Herzeleid" chorale settings.

==== Late 1740s ====
Bach combined the passion with seven arias from Handel's Brockes Passion for a new performance around 1747. Some of these arias replaced movements of the preceding version, other arias were inserted without replacing earlier material. This pasticcio version is known as BNB I/K/2.

Original version compared with Bach's three versions(green background:) appears without discernable modifications in all four versions
Movement	Voices	Instr. (all choral movements incl. Ob I/II)	Hamburg 1707	BC D 5a	BC D 5b	BNB I/K/2
Sonata and Chorus	choir	Str Bc	1. Jesus Christus ist um unser Missetat willen verwundet	→ 1	→ 1	→ 1
Recitative	Evangelist, Jesus, Peter	Str Bc	2. Und da sie den Lobgesang gesprochen hatten	→ 2	→ 2	→ 2
Aria	soprano	Bc	3. Will dich die Angst betreten	→ 3	→ 3	→ 3
Recitative	Evangelist, Jesus	Str Bc	4. Und nahm zu sich Petrus und Jakobus und Johannes	→ 4	→ 4	→ 4
Chorale	choir	Str Bc	5. Was mein Gott will, das g'scheh allzeit	→ 5	→ 5	—
Aria	soprano	Ob Bc	—	—	—	5. Sünder, schaut mit Furcht und Zagen, HWV 48/9
Recitative	Evangelist, Jesus	Str Bc	6. Und kam und fand sie schlafend	→ 6a [6]	→ 6a [6]	→ 6a
Recitative	Evangelist, Judas	Bc	7. Und alsbald, da er noch redet	→ 6b [7]	→ 6b [7]	→ 6b
Aria	tenor	Vl I/II Bc	8. Wenn nun der Leib wird sterben müssen	→ 7 [8]	→ 7 [8]	→ 7
Recitative	Evangelist, Jesus	Str Bc	9. Die aber legten ihre Hände an ihn	→ 8a [9]	→ 8a [9]	→ 8a
Recitative	Evangelist	Bc	10. Und die Jünger verließen ihn alle und flohen	→ 8b [10]	→ 8b [10]	→ 8b
Chorus	choir	Str Bc	11. Wir haben gehöret, daß er saget	→ 8c [11]	→ 8c [11]	→ 8c
Recitative	Evangelist, High priest, Jesus	Str Bc	12. Aber ihr Zeugnis stimmet noch nicht überein	→ 8d [12]	→ 8d [12]	→ 8d
Aria	tenor	Ob I/II Vl I/II (all in unison) Bc	—	—	—	9. Erwäg, ergrimmte Natternbruth, HWV 48/23
Recitative	Evangelist	Bc	(12 continued)	→ (8d [12] continued)	→ (8d [12] continued)	→ 10a Da fingen an etliche ihn zu verspeien
Chorus	choir	Str Bc	13. Weissage uns!	→ 8e [13]	→ 8e [13]	→ 10b
Recitative	Evangelist, Ancilla, Peter	Bc	14. Und die Knechte schlugen ihn in's Angesicht	→ 8f [14]	→ 8f [14]	→ 10c
Chorus	choir	Str Bc	15. Wahrlich, du dist der' einer	→ 8 g [15]	→ 8 g [15]	→ 10d
Recitative	Evangelist, Petrus	Bc	16. Er aber fing an sich zu verfluchen und zu schwören	→ 8h [16]	→ 8h [16]	→ 10e
Aria	tenor	Vl I/II (in unison) Bc	17. Wein, ach wein jetzt um die Wette	→ 9 [17]	→ 9 [17]	→ 11
Chorale	choir	Str Bc	—	—	9+. So gehst du nun, mein Jesu, BWV 500a (BDW 00571)	→ 12
Sinfonia		Vl I/II Va I Bc	18.	→ 10 [18]	→ 10 [18]	→ 13
Recitative	Evangelist, Pilate, Jesus	Bc	19. Und Bald am Morgen	→ 11 [19]	→ 11 [19]	→ 14
Aria	alto	Vl I/II Bc	20. Klaget nur, ihr Kläger hier	→ 12 [20]	→ 12 [20]	→ 15
Recitative	Evangelist, Pilate	Bc	21. Jesus aber antwortete nichts mehr	→ 13a [21]	→ 13a [21]	→ 16a
Chorus	choir	Str Bc	22.1 Kreuzige ihn!	→ 13b [22]	→ 13b [22]	→ 16b
Recitative	Evangelist, Pilate	Bc	22.2 Pilatus aber sprach zu ihnen	→ 13c [22]	→ 13c [22]	→ 16c
Chorus	choir	Str Bc	22.3 Kreuzige ihn!	→ 13d [22]	→ 13d [22]	→ 16d
Chorale	choir	Str Bc	23. O hilf, Christe, Gottes Sohn	14. [23] O hilf, Christe, Gottes Sohn (BDW 01677)	14a. O hilf Christe, Gottes Sohn, BWV 1084 (BDW 01270)	→ 17
Sinfonia		Vl I/II Va I Bc	24.	→ 15 [24]	→ 15 [24]	→ 18
Recitative	Evangelist	Bc	25. Pilatus aber gedachte	→ 16a [25]	→ 16a [25]	→ 19a
Chorus	choir	Str Bc	26. Gegrüßet seist du, der Juden König	→ 16b [26]	→ 16b [26]	→ 19b
Recitative	Evangelist	Bc	27. Und schlugen ihm das Haupt mit dem Rohr	→ 16c [27]	→ 16c [27]	→ 19c
Aria	bass	Str Bc	28. O süßes Kreuz	→ 17 [28]	→ 17 [28]	→ 20
Recitative	Evangelist	Bc	29. Und sie brachten ihn an die Stätte Golgatha	→ 18 [29]	→ 18 [29]	→ 21
Aria	soprano	Ob Bc	30. O Golgotha!	→ 19 [30]	→ 19 [30]	—
Aria and Chorus	soprano, choir	Vl I/II (in unison) Bc	—	—	—	22. Eilt, ihr angefochtnen Seelen HWV 48/39b
Recitative	Evangelist	Bc	31. Und da sie ihn gekreuziget hatten	→ 20 [31]	→ 20 [31]	→ 23
Aria	alto	Bc	32. Was seh' ich hier	→ 21 [32]	→ 21 [32]	—
Aria	soprano	Str Ob I/II Bc	—	—	—	24. Hier erstarrt mein Herz und Blut HWV 48/42b
Recitative	Evangelist	Bc	33. Und es war oben über ihm geschrieben	→ 22a [33]	→ 22a [33]	→ 25a
Chorus	choir	Str Bc	34. Pfui dich (or: Sieh doch), wie fein zerbrichst du]	→ 22b [34]	→ 22b [34]	→ 25b
Recitative	Evangelist	Bc	35. Desselbengleichen die Hohenpriester	→ 22c [35]	→ 22c [35]	→ 25c
Chorus	choir	Str Bc	36. Er hat andern geholfen	→ 22d [36]	→ 22d [36]	→ 25d
Recitative	Evangelist	Bc	37. Und die mit ihm gekreuzigte waren	→ 22e [37]	→ 22e [37]	→ 25e
Aria	soprano	Vl I/II Bas I/II Bc	—	—	—	26 Was Wunder, das der Sonnen Pracht HWV 48/45b
Recitative	Evangelist	Bc	(37 continued)	→ (22e [37] continued)	→ (22e [37] continued)	→ 27a Und um die neunte Stunde
Arioso	Jesus	Str Bc	38. Eli, Eli, lama asabthani?	→ 22f [38]	→ 22f [38]	→ 27b
Recitative	Evangelist	Bc	39. Das ist verdolmetschet	→ 22 g [39]	→ 22 g [39]	→ 27c
Chorus	choir	Str Bc	40. Siehe, er rufet den Elias	→ 22h [40]	→ 22h [40]	→ 27d
Recitative	Evangelist, Soldier	Bc	41. Da lief einer	→ 22i [41]	→ 22i [41]	→ 27e
Chorale	alto	Bc	42. Wann ich einmal soll scheiden	→ 23 [42]	→ 23 [42]	→ 28
Aria	soprano	Vl I/II (in unison) Bc	43. Seht, Menschenkinder, seht	→ 24a [43]	→ 24a [43]	→ 29a (either this one or 29b)
Aria	tenor	Vl I/II (in unison) Bc	44. Der Fürst der Welt erbleicht	→ 24b [44]	→ 24b [44]	→ 29b (either this one or 29a)
Sinfonia		Vl I/II Va I Bc	45.	→ 25 [45]	→ 25 [45]	→ 30
Recitative	Evangelist, Centurion	Bc	46. Und der Vorhang im Tempel zeriß in zwei Stück	→ 26 [46]	→ 26 [46]	→ 31
Aria	bass	Vl I/II Bc	—	—	—	32. Wie kömmt's, daß, da der Himml weint HWV 48/50b
Recitative	Evangelist	Bc	(46 continued)	→ (26 [46] continued)	→ (26 [46] continued)	→ 33. Und es waren auch Weiber da
Aria	alto	Str Bc	47. Dein Jesus hat das Haupt geneiget	→ 27 [47]	→ 27 [47]	→ 34
Recitative	Evangelist	Bc	48. Und er kaufte eine Leinwand	→ 28 [48]	→ 28 [48]	→ 35
Chorale	choir	Str Bc	49. O Traurigkeit, o Herzeleid	29a. [49] O Traurigkeit, o Herzeleid (BDW 01678)	29a. O Traurigkeit, o Herzeleid (BDW 01679)	—
Aria	soprano	Vl I/II Ob Bc	—	—	—	36. Wisch ab der Tränen scharfe Lauge HWV 48/53
Chorus	choir	Str Bc	50.1 O selig, selig ist zu dieser Frist	→ 29b [50]	→ 29b [50]	→ 37
Chorale	choir	Str Bc	50.2 O Jesu du	→ 29c [50]	→ 29c [50]	→ 38
Chorus	choir	Str Bc	50.3 Amen	→ 29d [50]	→ 29d [50]	→ 39

=== Pasticcios deriving from the original and/or Hamburg version ===
There are two known pasticcio versions of the passion, independent of Bach's three versions.

==== Combined with two passion-oratorios by Reinhard Keiser ====
D-Gs 8|o Cod. Ms. philos. 84|e: Keiser 1 is a pasticcio based on Jesus Christus ist um unsrer Missetat willen verwundet and two Passion-Oratorios by Reinhard Keiser: his Brockes-Passion setting (1712) and his Der zum Tode verurteilte und gekreuzigte Jesus, published in Berlin in 1715.

==== Hamburg 1729 ====
D-B Mus. ms. 11471 is a manuscript representing a pasticcio version of the St. Mark passion-oratorio which originated in or around Hamburg in 1729. In this manuscript the Passion is attributed to Reinhard Keiser. Like the previous, also this pasticcio is completely independent from Bach's versions.

== Bach's versions ==
Bach held deep regard for the chief Hanseatic League cities of Hamburg and Lübeck throughout his life. In his mid and late teen years, he had opportunities to visit both cities while a student at St. Michael's Church School, Lüneburg (a period from 1700 to 1702). From November 1705 to February 1706, he again made the trip north from Arnstadt to Lübeck (and possibly to Hamburg as well). He again visited Hamburg in 1720 to try out for the position of Organist at the Jakobikirche, a visit during which he won the rarely afforded praise of the aged Johann Adam Reincken. It is possible that he became acquainted with a work during his earlier visits to Hamburg that would occupy a central place in his musical library for the rest of his life.

The manuscripts for the Weimar version (BC 5a) and the first Leipzig version (BC 5b) are:

- D-B Mus. ms. 11471/1 – a 45-page set of parts in the hands of Bach, Anonymous Weimar I (Johann Martin Schubart), Johann Heinrich Bach, Anonymous Weimar III, and Christian Gottlob Meißner. The title page of this one bears the inscription "Passion Christi / secundum Marcum [corrected from "Matthäum"] / à 5 Strom 4 Voci / di Sigre / R. [corrected from ?] Kaiser" in the hand of Meißner. This set of parts came into Emanuel Bach's possession after Sebastian's death, at whose death it was purchased (among other Bachiana) by Georg Pölchau, from whom it went into the possession of the Staatsbibliothek zu Berlin. This collective manuscript consists of:
  - Score parts written in Weimar (ca. 1713) (parts by Bach, Schubart, Anon. W 3). Parts consist of Violin I, II; Viola I, II; Continuo (Cembalo {Harpsichord)); Soprano; Alto; Tenor; Bass (voice type)
  - Score parts written in Leipzig (1726) (parts by Bach, Heinrich Bach, Meißner). Parts consist of Continuo (transposed); Soprano; Alto; Tenor I, II; Bass
- D-B N. Mus. ms. 10624 – a 57-page score Wilhelm Rust derived from the previous in the 19th century. He titled this reconstructed score "Dr. Rust / Passion / nach dem Evangelium / St. Marcus / componirt / von ?" and on page 2 "Passion nach dem Ev. Marcus / Aus J. S. Bach's größtentheils eigenhändig geschriebenen Stimmen / in Partitur gesetzt / von / Dr. Wilhelm Rust, Cantor zu St. Thomas / in Leipzig". This is the main source for Bach's Weimar version of Jesus Christus ist um unser Missetat willen verwundet.

These sources remain possibly incomplete. Whether any of the sources mentioned above represent the original form of the work is also doubtful. Even instrumentation is questionable. The oboe solo part required for some of the movements is included in the violin I part, which means that it is possible that the violin I player(s) were intended to be used for these parts as well, or that possibly the oboe parts are missing (meaning that there were one or even two oboe players intended for the work). Also noticeably missing is a figured organ part, a bassoon part, a violoncello part, and a part for viol. The lack of an organ part has been variously explained by the fact that from the middle of 1712 until, probably, 1714, the Organ of the Weimar Schloßkirche (the Himmelsburg) was being renovated.

Bach's third version (BNB I/K/2) can be reconstructed from the above, from Handel's Brockes Passion, and:

- D-B N. Mus. ms. 468 the harpsichord part for this pasticcio (Part by Johann Christoph Friedrich Bach with figures by J. S. Bach dating from 1743 to 1748)
- Privatbesitz C. Thiele, BWV deest (NBA Serie II:5) a fragment of the Bassoon part in Bach's handwriting (dating from 1743 to 1748). The Bassoon part is for one of the Handel arias in the pasticcio.

=== Bach's fifth Passion? ===
Bach's Nekrolog (obituary) was published in 1754 by Lorenz Christoph Mizler. Its authors, Bach's son Carl Philipp Emanuel Bach and his former pupil Johann Friedrich Agricola, indicated in the list of unpublished works, pp. 168–169 of the Nekrolog, that Bach would have written five Passions. Four of these are easily identified, they were listed as Nos. 244–247 in the Bach-Werke-Verzeichnis. As for the fifth Passion it is unclear which composition may have been meant by the authors of the Nekrolog. Jesus Christus ist um unsrer Missetat willen verwundet as arranged and expanded by Bach is one of the more likely candidates, along with the somewhat elusive Weimarer Passion, and Wer ist der, so von Edom kömmt, a pasticcio including a few movements by Bach (although it is unclear whether Bach actively contributed to this pasticcio – possibly it was not assembled until after the composer's death).

=== Weimar, 1710–1714 (BC D 5a) ===
No evidence exists that Bach was required (in his official duties) to provide Passion music for his early posts in Weimar (1703), Arnstadt (1703–1707), Mühlhausen (1707–1708), and Weimar (1708–1717). However, he did receive requests to do so on two occasions: once on commission by Frederick III, Duke of Saxe-Gotha-Altenburg (resulting in the so-called Weimarer Passion (BWV deest, BC D 1), and another resulting in his first version of Jesus Christus ist um unsrer Missetat willen verwundet.

The origins of the commission for this work (BWV deest, BC D 5a) are unknown. All documentary material for Bach's time in Weimar during this period (1708–1717) were destroyed in a 1774 fire that consumed the palace that Bach was employed in during this period, the Wilhelmsburg. The only evidence that has come down is a set of performance parts archived in the Staatsbibliothek zu Berlin (SBB).

There are many questions still surrounding this work. Many scholars question whether the set of parts that we have are complete. Even the dating is questionable. Originally, scholars assigned the dating to Good Friday (14 April) 1713, but is now put down to Good Friday (25 March) 1712 or even a year or two earlier., or even Good Friday (30 March) 1714

The work is in 32 movements, of which two were composed by Bach (No. 14 "O hilf, Christe, Gottes Sohn", BDW 01677 and No. 29 "O Traurigkeit, o Herzeleid", BDW 01678):

1. Sonata and Chorus: Jesus Christus ist um unser Missetat willen verwundet
2. Recitative (Evangelist, Jesus, Petrus): Und da sie den Lobgesang gesprochen hatten
3. Aria (soprano, basso continuo): Will dich die Angst betreten
4. Recitative (Evangelist, Jesus): Und nahm zu sich Petrus und Jakobus und Johannes
5. Chorale: Was mein Gott will, das g'scheh allzeit
6. Recitative (Evangelist, Jesus): Und kam und fand sie schlafend
  Recitative (Evangelist, Judas): Und alsbald, da er noch redet
7. Aria (tenor, violins, continuo): Wenn nun der Leib wird sterben müssen
8. Recitative (Evangelist, Jesus): Die aber legten ihre Hände an ihn
  Recitative (Evangelist): Und die Jünger verließen ihn alle und flohen
  Chorus: Wir haben gehöret
  Recitative (Evangelist, Hohenpriester, Jesus): Aber ihr Zeugnis stimmet noch nicht überein
  Chorus: Weissage uns!
  Recitative (Evangelist, Magd, Petrus): Und die Knechte schlugen ihn in's Angesicht
  Chorus: Wahrlich, du bist der einer
  Recitative (Evangelist, Petrus): Er aber fing an sich zu verfluchen und zu schwören
9. Aria (tenor, violins, continuo): Wein, ach wein jetzt um die Wette
10. Sinfonia
11. Recitative (Evangelist, Pilatus, Jesus): Und Bald am Morgen
12. Aria (alto, violins, continuo): Klaget nur, ihr Kläger hier
13. Recitative (Evangelist, Pilatus): Jesus aber antwortete nichts mehr
  Chorus: Kreuzige ihn!
  Recitative (Evangelist, Pilatus): Pilatus aber sprach zu ihnen
  Chorus: Kreuzige ihn!
14. Chorale: O hilf Christe, Gottes Sohn
15. Sinfonia
16. Recitative (Evangelist): Pilatus aber gedachte
  Chorus: Gegrüßet seist du
  Recitative (Evangelist): Und schlugen ihm das Haupt mit dem Rohr
17. Aria (bass (voice type), violins, continuo): O süßes Kreuz
18. Recitative (Evangelist): Und sie brachten ihn an die Stätte Golgatha
19. Aria (soprano, oboe or violin I, continuo): O Golgotha!
20. Recitative (Evangelist): Und da sie ihn gekreuziget hatten
21. Aria (alto, continuo): Was seh' ich hier
22. Recitative (Evangelist): Und es war oben über ihm geschrieben
  Chorus: Pfui dich* [*Textvariante: Seht doch]
  Recitative (Evangelist): Desselbengleichen die Hohenpriester
  Chorus: Er hat anderen geholfen
  Recitative (Evangelist): Und die mit ihm gekreuzigte waren
  Arioso (Jesus): Eli, Eli, lama asabthani?
  Recitative (Evangelist): Das ist verdolmetschet
  Chorus: Siehe, er rufet den Elias.
  Recitative (Evangelist, Kriegsknecht): Da lief einer
23. Chorale (alto, continuo): Wenn ich einmal soll scheiden
24. Aria (soprano, tenor, violins, continuo): Seht, Menschenkinder, seht
25. Sinfonia
26. Recitative (Evangelist, Hauptmann): Und der Vorhang im Tempel zeriß in zwei Stück
27. Aria (alto, violins, violas, continuo): Dein Jesus hat das Haupt geneiget
28. Recitative (Evangelist): Und er kaufte eine Leinwand
29. Chorale: O Traurigkeit
30. Chorale: O selig ist
31. Chorale: O Jesu du
32. Chorale: Amen.

Christian Friedrich Henrici, the man who would later provide Bach with many of his cantata and oratorio texts, would use the text for Movement 9 (slightly altered) in one of his own collections (entitled Sammlung Erbaulicher Gedanken über und auf die gewöhnlichen Sonn- u. Fest-Tage, in gebundener Schreib-Art entworffen). The two Bach additions (Movements 14 and 29) are catalogued as BWV deest serie II: 02 and 03.

=== Leipzig 1726 (BC D 5b) ===
Nearly three years into his post as 'Cantor (church) of the Thomasschule zu Leipzig and Directoris Chori musici in Leipzig', Bach ran into a quandary. He had begun and nearly completed a score for a St Matthew Passion, a project which he began in 1725 but put aside for a revival of his St John Passion, when he again for some unknown reason set aside the project (he would complete it and first perform his St Matthew Passion on 11 April 1727). Instead he decided to revive his Weimar pastiche. This work was performed on 19 April 1726. For this work, he changed two movements (Nos. 14 and 29 of the Weimar work) and, to fit it to the Church Ordinance for Good Friday Vespers services in Leipzig, he split it into two parts by adding a chorale. The violin I part for this work (BWV deest, BC D 5b) is missing in all his new additions (and has been reconstructed), but on the whole, the parts are more complete. This work has come down to us in the form of a vocal score and parts set dating from before 1726 in the hands of Johann Sebastian Bach, Christian Gottlob Meißner, and Johann Heinrich Bach, and is currently stored in the Staatsbibliothek zu Berlin under the Catalogue number D B Mus. ms. 11471/2. The title page (like the Weimar one) reads 'Passion Christi / secundum Marcum [korrigiert aus Matthäum] / à 5 Strom 4 Voci / di Sigre / R. Kaiser.'

In this version the following parts are by Bach:

- No. 9b: 'So gehst du nun, mein Jesu', BWV 500a, BDW 00571.
- No. 14: 'O hilf Christe, Gottes Sohn', BWV 1084, BDW 01270, which is a variant of the setting included in the Weimar version.
- No. 29: 'O Traurigkeit, o Herzeleid', BDW 01679, which is a variant of the setting used in the Weimar version

The sequence of movements in this version is as follows:

Prima Parte

1. Sonata and Chorus: Jesus Christus ist um unser Missetat willen verwundet
2. Recitative (Evangelist, Jesus, Petrus): Und da sie den Lobgesang gesprochen hatten
3. Aria (soprano, basso continuo): Will dich die Angst betreten
4. Recitative (Evangelist, Jesus): Und nahm zu sich Petrus und Jakobus und Johannes
5. Chorale: Was mein Gott will, das g'scheh allzeit
6. Recitative (Evangelist, Jesus): Und kam und fand sie schlafend
  Recitative (Evangelist, Judas): Und alsbald, da er noch redet
7. Aria (tenor, violins, continuo): Wenn nun der Leib wird sterben müssen
8. Recitative (Evangelist, Jesus): Die aber legten ihre Hände an ihn
  Recitative (Evangelist): Und die Jünger verließen ihn alle und flohen
  Chorus: Wir haben gehöret
  Recitative (Evangelist, Hohenpriester, Jesus): Aber ihr Zeugnis stimmet noch nicht überein
  Chorus: Weissage uns!
  Recitative (Evangelist, Magd, Petrus): Und die Knechte schlugen ihn in's Angesicht
  Chorus: Wahrlich, du bist der einer
  Recitative (Evangelist, Petrus): Er aber fing an sich zu verfluchen und zu schwören
9. Aria (tenor, violins, continuo): Wein, ach wein jetzt um die Wette
  Chorale: So gehst du nun, mein Jesus, hin, Violino I vermutlich verschollen, und zu rekonstruieren

Seconda Parte

10. Sinfonia
11. Recitative (Evangelist, Pilatus, Jesus): Und Bald am Morgen
12. Aria (alto, violins, continuo): Klaget nur, ihr Kläger hier
13. Recitative (Evangelist, Pilatus): Jesus aber antwortete nichts mehr
  Chorus: Kreuzige ihn!
  Recitative (Evangelist, Pilatus): Pilatus aber sprach zu ihnen
  Chorus: Kreuzige ihn!
14. Chorale: O hilf Christe, Gottes Sohn Sart 14a ersetzt den Satz 14 der Weimarer Fassung 1712/1713 in den Fassungen von 1726 bzw. ca. 1745–1748. Violino I vermutlich verschollen, und zu rekonstruieren
15. Sinfonia
16. Recitative (Evangelist): Pilatus aber gedachte
  Chorus: Gegrüßet seist du
  Recitative (Evangelist): Und schlugen ihm das Haupt mit dem Rohr
17. Aria (bass, violins, continuo): O süßes Kreuz
18. Recitative (Evangelist): Und sie brachten ihn an die Stätte Golgatha
19. Aria (soprano, oboe or violin I, continuo): O Golgotha!
20. Recitative (Evangelist): Und da sie ihn gekreuziget hatten
21. Aria (alto, continuo): Was seh' ich hier
22. Recitative (Evangelist): Und es war oben über ihm geschrieben
  Chorus: Pfui dich* [*Textvariante: Seht doch]
  Recitative (Evangelist): Desselbengleichen die Hohenpriester
  Chorus: Er hat anderen geholfen
  Recitative (Evangelist): Und die mit ihm gekreuzigte waren
  Arioso (Jesus): Eli, Eli, lama asabthani?
  Recitative (Evangelist): Das ist verdolmetschet
  Chorus: Siehe, er rufet den Elias.
  Recitative (Evangelist, Kriegsknecht): Da lief einer
23. Chorale (alto, continuo): Wenn ich einmal soll scheiden
24. Aria (soprano, violins, continuo): Seht, Menschenkinder, seht
  Aria (tenore, violins, continuo): Der Fürst der Welt erbleicht
25. Sinfonia
26. Recitative (Evangelist, Hauptmann): Und der Vorhang im Tempel zeriß in zwei Stück
27. Aria (alto, violins, violas, continuo): Dein Jesus hat das Haupt geneiget
28. Recitative (Evangelist): Und er kaufte eine Leinwand
29. Chorale: O Traurigkeit 1726 und ca. 1745–1748 statt in Halbe in Viertel notiert.
30. Chorale: O selig ist
31. Chorale: O Jesu du
32. Chorale: Amen.

Like the Weimar work, this work also was scored for SATB soloists and choir, oboes I/II, violins I/II, violas I/II, and basso continuo. Like the Weimar work, the oboes were also included in the Choral and Sinfonia sections. However, the parts this time also included a figured organ part. In two of the three new additions (Movements 10 and 15), the first violin part is missing and has been reconstructed. Of the new additions (Movements 10, 15, and 30), Alfred Dürr noted that the bass line of Movement 10 mirrored exactly the bass line of the sacred song from Georg Christian Schemelli's Musicalisches Gesang-Buch, So gehst du nun, mein Jesus, hin BWV 500 (it is included in the BWV catalog as BWV 500a). Movement 15 was used as a replacement of Movement 14 of BC D 5a, and is cataloged as BWV 1084 (no BC number yet) and is also marked alla breve as is its predecessor, but instead of half notes as the main beat, the quarter note gets the main beat. Movement 30 was used to replace Movement 29 of BC D 5a, and is cataloged as BWV deest serie II: 04 (similar case as far as notation to Movement 15).

=== Leipzig 1747–1748 (BNB I/K/2) ===
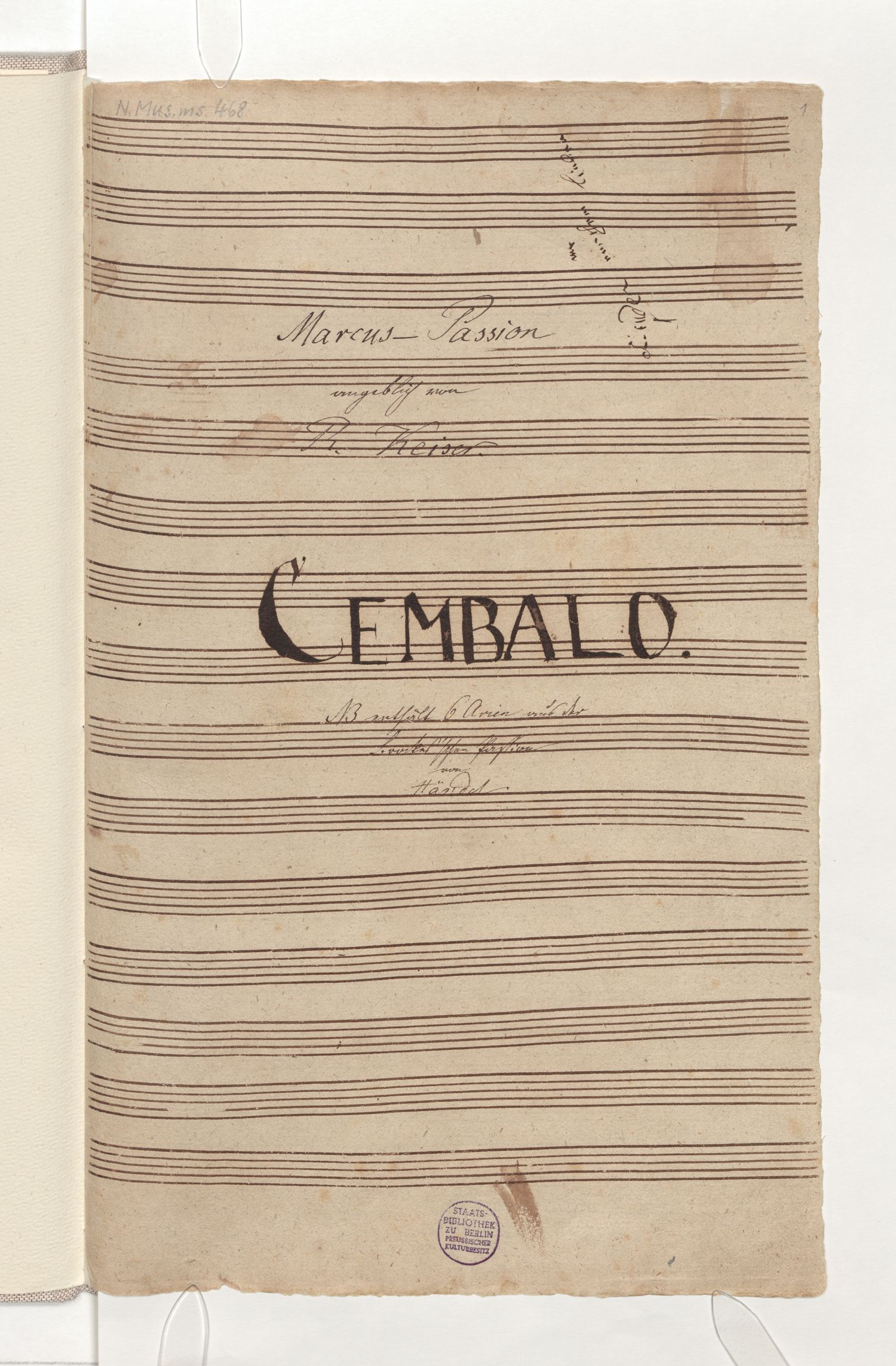
Cover page of manuscript source D B N Mus. ms. 468 Harpsichord part for the 2nd Leipzig St Mark Passion pastiche at the Staatsbibliothek zu Berlin (Courtesy of http://www.bach-digital.de)

Bach again revived this pastiche on either 31 April 1747 (at the St. Nicholas Church, Leipzig) or 12 April 1748 (at the St. Thomas Church, Leipzig). Of all the pastiches, this one was the most complex and involved. In many ways, it was more a true pastiche than the previous two were. In addition to his own music (two movements), Bach incorporated seven arias from George Frideric Handel's Brockes Passion HWV 48 into the original. This work (BWV deest – Serie II: 005; BC D 5; BNB I/K/2) has come down only in two partial manuscripts. One is a complete harpsichord part of 10 pages dating from between 1743 and 1748 housed at the Staatsbibliothek zu Berlin under Catalogue number D B N. Mus. ms. 468. This part is written in the hands of Johann Christoph Friedrich Bach (notes), Johann Sebastian Bach (figures), and Wilhelm Rust (title page). Its title page reads "Marcus-Passion / angeblich von R: Keiser" and underneath this "NB enthält 6 Arien aus der Brockes'schen / Passion von Händel". After Bach's death, it came into possession of an unknown individual, from whom it entered into possession of Wilhelm Rust, whose heir Maria Rust next took possession of it. It then entered into the possession of an A. Martin in Weimar, from whence it entered into (in succession) the possessions of an A. Thiele and then B. Thiele (also in Weimar), from whence it entered into the possession of the Antiquarian Bookshop of Joseph Abraham Stargardt in Berlin, from whence it entered into the possession of the Staatsbibliothek zu Berlin in 1987.

The other source material is a one-page fragment of the Bassoon I part of the Aria "Was Wunder, daß der Sonnen Pracht" from Handel's HWV 48 in the hand of Johann Sebastian Bach dating from between 1743 and 1748. This part followed pretty much the same path as the part above, however after it came into possession of B. Thiele, it next entered into possession of C. Thiele in Kiel. It is marked under catalog number Privatbesitz C. Thiele, BWV deest (Serie II: 005).

The text for this work is as follows:

Prima Parte

1. Sonata and Chorus: Jesus Christus ist um unser Missetaten willen verwundet
2. Recitative (Evangelist, Jesus, Petrus): Und da sie den Lobgesang gesprochen hatten
3. Aria (soprano, continuo): Will dich die Angst betreten
4. Recitative (Evangelist, Jesus): Und nahm zu sich Petrus und Jakobus und Johannes
5. Aria (soprano, oboe, continuo): Sünder, schaut mit Furcht und Zagen
6. Recitative (Evangelist, Jesus): Und kam und fand sie schlafend
  Recitative (Evangelist, Judas): Und alsbald, da er noch redet
7. Aria (tenor, violins, continuo): Wenn nun der Leib wird sterben müssen
8. Recitative (Evangelist, Jesus): Die aber legten ihre Hände an ihn
  Recitative (Evangelist): Und die Jünger verließen ihn alle und flohen
  Chorus: Wir haben gehöret
  Recitative (Evangelist, Hohenpriester, Jesus): Aber ihr Zeugnis stimmet noch nicht überein
  Aria (tenor, oboes, violins, continuo): Erwäg, ergrimmte Natternbruth HWV 48/23Eingefügte Arie aus Händels Brockes-Passion
  Recitative (Evangelist): Da fingen an etliche ihn zu verspeien
  Chorus: Weissage uns!
  Recitative (Evangelist, Magd, Petrus): Und die Knechte schlugen ihn ins Angesicht
  Chorus: Wahrlich, du bist der einer
  Recitative (Evangelist, Petrus): Er aber fing an sich zu verfluchen und zu schwören
9. Aria (tenor, violins in unison, continuo): Wein, ach wein jetzt um die Wette
  Chorale: So gehst du nun mein Jesus, hin Violino I vermutlich verschollen, und zu rekonstruieren.

Seconda Parte

10. Sinfonia
11. Recitative (Evangelist, Pilatus, Jesus): Und Bald am Morgen hielten die Hohenpriester einen Rat
12. Aria (alto, violins, continuo): Klaget nur, ihr Kläger hier
13. Recitative (Evangelist, Pilatus): Jesus aber antwortete nichts mehr
  Chorus: Kreuzige Ihn!
  Recitative (Evangelist, Pilatus): Pilatus aber sprach zu ihnen
  Chorus: Kreuzige Ihn!
14. Chorale: O hilf, Christe, Gottes Sohn Satz 14a ersetzt den Satz 14 der Weimarer Fassung 1712/1713 in den Fassungen von 1726 bzw. ca. 1745–1748. Violino I vermutlich verschollen, und zu rekonstruieren
15. Sinfonia
16. Recitative (Evangelist): Pilatus aber gedachte dem Volk genug zu tun
  Chorus: Gegrüßet seist du
  Recitative (Evangelist): Und schlugen ihm das Haupt mit dem Rohr
17. Aria (bass, violins, violas, continuo): O süßes Kreuz
18. Recitative (Evangelist): Und sie brachten ihn an die Stätte Golgatha
19. Aria and Chorus (soprano solo, choir, violins, continuo): Eilt, iht angefochtnen Seelen HWV 48/41 Eingefügte Arie aus Händels Brockes-Passion als Esatz für die Arie 19 "O Golgatha"
20. Recitative (Evangelist): Und da sie ihn gekreuziget hatten
21. Aria (soprano, oboes, violins, viola, continuo): Hier erstarrt mein Herz in Blut HWV 48/44 Eingefügte Arie aus Händels Brockes-Passion, als Ersatz für die Arie "Was sehe ich hier"
22. Recitative (Evangelist): Und es war oben über ihm geschrieben
  Chorus: Pfui dich* [*Textvariante: Seht doch]
  Recitative (Evangelist): Desselbengleichen die Hohenpriester verspotteten ihn untereinander
  Chorus: Er hat anderen geholfen
  Recitative (Evangelist): Und die mit ihm gekreuzigte waren
  Aria (soprano, violins, bassoons, continuo): Was Wunder, das der Sonnen Pracht HWV 48/48 Eingefügte Arie aus Händels Brockes-Passion
  Arioso (Jesus): Eli, Eli, lama asabthani?
  Recitative (Evangelist): Das ist verdolmetschet
  Chorus: Siehe, er rufet den Elias.
  Recitative (Evangelist, Kriegsknecht): Und da lief einer
23. Chorale (alto, continuo): Wenn ich einmal soll scheiden
24. Aria (soprano, violins, continuo): Seht Menschenkinder, seht
  Aria (tenore, violins, continuo): Der Fürst der Welt erbleicht
25. Sinfonia
26. Recitative (Evangelist, Hauptmann): Und der Vorhang im Tempel zeriß in zwei Stück
  Aria (bass, violins, continuo): Wie kömmt's, daß, da der Himml weint HWV 48/52 Eingefügte Arie aus Händels Brockes-Passion
  Recitative (Evangelist): Und es waren auch Weiber da
27. Aria (alto, violins, violas, continuo): Dein Jesus hat das Haupt geneiget
28. Recitative (Evangelist): Und er kaufte eine Leinwand
29. Aria (soprano, oboes, violins, continuo): Wisch ab der Tränen scharfe Lauge HWV 48/55 Eingefügte Arie aus Händels Brockes-Passion, als Ersatz für den Choral "O Traurigkeit, o Herzeleid"
30. Chorale: O selig ist
31. Chorale: O Jesu du
32. Chorale: Amen.

The instrumentation is for a larger ensemble: SATB soloists and choir, oboe I/II, bassoon I/II, violin I/II, viola I/II, and basso continuo.

== Reception ==
In the first half of the 18th century, Jesus Christus ist um unsrer Missetat willen verwundet proved one of the more popular passion settings in Protestant Germany. As a Passion based on the Gospel text of one of the four evangelists, as opposed to the upcoming Passion-Oratorio genre based on a freer interpretation of Gospel texts combined from several evangelists, such as the Brockes Passion, it was exceptional in being performed in half a dozen versions and in multiple cities.

The reception of the composition by Bach is of historic importance as it shows many of the characteristics he would adopt in his own famous passion settings: the vox Christi treatment (with arioso, and accompagnato, the "halo effect" of the strings,...), the typical Bach Evangelist, the recitative-aria-chorale units, chorales based on Paul Gerhardt's "O Haupt voll Blut und Wunden",... — all characteristics deemed typical for Bach's oratorios and passion settings that are present in this early 18th century work. Bach's last version also shows how the composer attempted to combine an Evangelist-based passion setting with a freer Passion-Oratorio setup (which is also what he had done in his St John Passion and St Matthew Passion, both containing movements based on the Brockes Passion text). Bach's versions of this passion overarch his known passion compositions: he copied and performed the score prior to his first passion composition, the Weimarer Passion, he staged it again between the first performances of the St John and the St Matthew, and his last version of this St Mark was performed around the time he finished revising his other passion settings.

Then the work was forgotten for a long time: nothing of it was mentioned in the 19th-century Bach Gesellschaft Ausgabe, nor in the 1950 first edition of the Bach-Werke-Verzeichnis. For a period of around two centuries the only thing that seems to have happened to the composition are Wilhelm Rust's efforts to analyse and reconstruct the original score. The score was published in the second half of the 20th century, and recorded for the first time in the early 1970s. The 21st century saw the publication and performance of Bach's 1740s pasticcio version. Another 21st-century development is the combination of the Gospel parts of the "Keiser" St Mark Passion with reconstructed choruses and arias of the largely lost BWV 247 St Mark Passion, into a new pasticcio.

=== Score editions ===
Felix Schroeder's score edition, based on the composite manuscript of Bach's first two versions (D-B Mus. ms. 11471/1) and the 1729 Hamburg pasticcio (D-B Mus. ms. 11471), was published by Hänssler in the 1960s, attributing the work to Reinhard Keiser. Another 1960s score edition was released by Donald George Moe and published by the University of Iowa.

Carus-Verlag published the BNB I/K/1 version, that is BC D 5a version of the score with the BC D 5b variants of the choral movements 9+, 14a and 29a appended, as Reinhard Keiser's work arranged by Bach, in 1997. Their publication of the BNB I/K/2 pasticcio, which indicated "Kaiser", Bach and Handel as its composers, followed in 2012: this edition contained reconstructed material and a detailed introduction by its editor Christine Blanken.

The Neue Bach-Ausgabe volume II/9 Latin Church Music, Passions: Works with Doubtful Authenticity, Arrangements of Music from other Composers, edited by Kirsten Beißwenger and published in 2000 by Bärenreiter, contains as well a critical commentary as score editions of the choral movements attributed to Bach, that is the choral movements "O hilf, Christe, Gottes Sohn" and "O Traurigkeit, o Herzeleid" of the BC D 5a version (section 7) and the three choral movements in the BC D 5b version (section 8). Section 9 of this score edition contains the fragments relating to the BNB I/K/2 version as available (without reconstruction of the missing parts). In this publication Reinhard Keiser is indicated as the composer of the original work.

CPDL contains all choral movements of the BC D 5b version, attributing them to Reinhard Keiser.

=== Discography ===
The first recording of the work was realised in February 1971 by Jörg Ewald Dähler. Another 1971 recording was directed by Alois J. Hochstrasser. 1973 recordings were conducted by Gert Sell and Albrecht Haupt. Daniel R. Melamed (2005) recommends two 1990s recordings, by Christian Brembeck and Michel Laplénie.

- Jacques Bona, Gerd Türk, Kai Wessel, Monique Zanetti, Ensemble Sagittarius, Michel Laplénie (Accord 205312).
- Bernhard Hirtreiter, Hartmut Elbert, Jochen Elbert, Tanja d'Althann, Parthenia Vocal & Baroque, Christian Brembeck Christophorus 1992
- The BC D 5a version of the work was recorded in 2008 on the Edition Chrismon label (Catalogue number 2035) and features Tenor Evangelist: Georg Poplutz, Soprano: Jutta von Landsberg [Arias & Chorus]; Soprano: Anke Briegel; Counter-tenor: Kerry Jago; Counter-tenor: Henning Voss; Tenor: Jörn Lindemann; Tenor: Birger Radde; Bass: Markus Flaig; and Bass: Tilli Schutze (?), with Capella Sancti Georgi and Musica Alta Ripa conducted by Ralf Popken. Another recording of the BC D 5a version, with the Ensemble Jacques Moderne, Gli Incogniti and violinist Amandine Beyer appeared on the label Mirare in 2015.
- Bach's second version (BC D 5b) was recorded in 2006 on the Con Affetto label featuring Tenor [Evangelist]: Daniel-Leo Meier; Bass [Jesus]: Nicolas Fink; Boy Soprano: Simeon Haefliger (soloist from Luzerner Knabenkantorei); Counter-tenor: Urs Weibel; Tenor: Sebastian Lipp, Brian Dean, Sabine Hochstrasser (Violins); Brigitte Gasser, Brian Franklin (Viola da gamba); Monika Hasselbach (Violoncello); Kiri Ivanov (Contrabass); and Mutsumi Ueno (Organ), with the Luzerner Knabenkantorei and Instrumentalists from Collegium Musicum Luzern conducted by Eberhard Rex.
- The BNB I/K/2 pasticcio version was released as a 2008 live recording with Kantorei St. Mauritius Hardegsen and Telemannisches Collegium Michaelstein conducted by Gerhard Ropeter. The vocal soloists on this recording are Yu Jost, Soprano (Maid), Dorothee Wohlgemuth, Soprano (Arias), Michael Leib, Alto (Arias, Judas, High Priest, Soldier, Centurion), Jörn Lindemann, Tenor (Arias, Evangelist), Samuel Hasselhorn, Tenor (Petrus), Benjamin Hasselhorn, Tenor (Pilatus), Falk Joost, Bass (Jesus), and Ralf Grobe, Bass (Arias).

== Sources ==
Score editions

- (Hänssler 1960s) Reinhard Keiser, edited by Felix Schroeder. Passionsoratorium nach dem Evangelisten Marcus. Stuttgart: Hänssler-Verlag, 1966. OCLC 862317
- (Iowa 1960s) Donald George Moe. The St. Mark Passion of Reinhard Keiser: A Practical Edition, with an Account of Its Historical Background University of Iowa, 1968
- (Carus 1997) Reinhard Keiser, arranged by Johann Sebastian Bach, edited by Hans Bergmann. Passio secundum Marcum (Markuspassion). Carus-Verlag, 1997.
- (Carus 2012) Christine Blanken, editor. "Kaiser" Markus-Passion als Pasticcio von Johann Sebastian Bach (Leipzig um 1747) mit Arien aus Georg Friedrich Händels "Brockes-Passion". Edition Bach-Archiv Leipzig (Musical Monuments Vol. 2). Carus-Verlag, 2012.
- (NBA 2000) Kirsten Beißwenger, editor. New Bach Edition Series II: Latin Church Music, Passions, Volume 9: Works with Doubtful Authenticity, Arrangements of Music from other Composers, Bärenreiter, 2000

Writings

- Daniel R. Melamed. "A St. Mark Passion Makes the Rounds" pp. 78–96 and 168–169, and tables p. 137 and 148–154 in Hearing Bachs Passions. Oxford University Press, 2005. ISBN 9780199883462
