= Balthasar Denner =

German painter

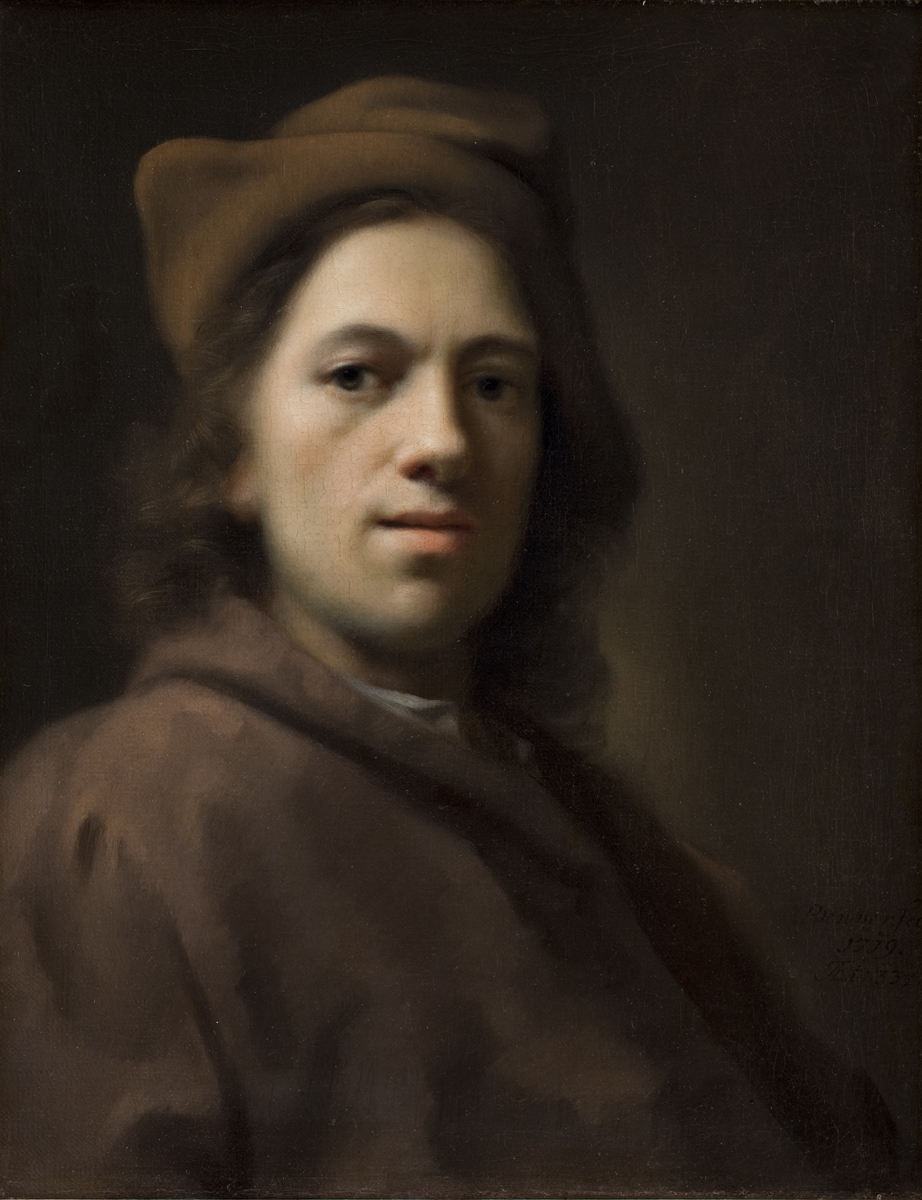
Balthasar Denner self-portrait, 1719

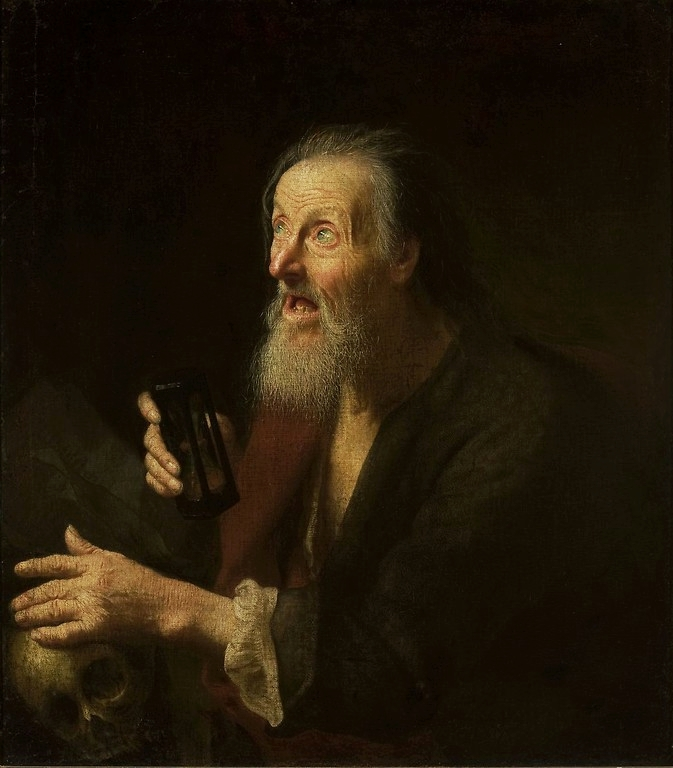
The old man with an hourglass and a skull, painted in Rembrandt's style (National Museum in Warsaw).

George Frideric Handel in 1727 attributed to Denner.

Balthasar Denner (15 November 1685 – 14 April 1749) was a German painter, highly regarded as a portraitist. He painted mostly half-length and head-and-shoulders portraits and a few group portraits of families in interiors. Usually Denner concentrated on the face; clothes and paraphernalia were done by other painters or later his daughter. His chief peculiarity consisted in the fineness of his mechanical finish, which extended to depicting even the almost invisible furze of hair growing on smooth skin. He is particularly noted for his heads of old men and women.

== Life ==
Denner was born in the city of Altona, now incorporated into Hamburg. At the time Altona was part of the Danish kingdom, its second largest city after Copenhagen and famous for its religious tolerance. His father Jacob Denner was a Mennonite minister and a dyer. Balthasar had seven sisters; he was the only son. When he was eight years old he had an accident and for the rest of his life he walked with a limp. His convalescence was slow and to cope with boredom Denner started to draw and copy paintings by Berchem and Bloemaert. His teacher was a Dutchman, Frans van Amama. In 1696 the family moved to Danzig, where Denner practiced oil painting between 1698 and 1700. In 1701 the family moved back to the Hanseatic town. Balthasar became a clerk for his uncle, who was a merchant. In 1707 he became a member of the Prussian Academy of Arts in Berlin.

Denner began his career as a painter of miniatures. In 1709 he painted the nine-year-old Charles Frederick, Duke of Holstein-Gottorp and his sister in miniature; Denner was invited to Gottorp Castle and painted himself in the background of a group portrait of the ducal family. In 1712 he married and the next year he moved to Hamburg when Altona was destroyed by Magnus Stenbock during the Great Nordic War; in 1714 he made a trip to Amsterdam; in 1715 to London; in 1717 to Copenhagen. In 1720 he visited the court in Wolfenbüttel and Hanover.

== Portrait of an Old Woman ==
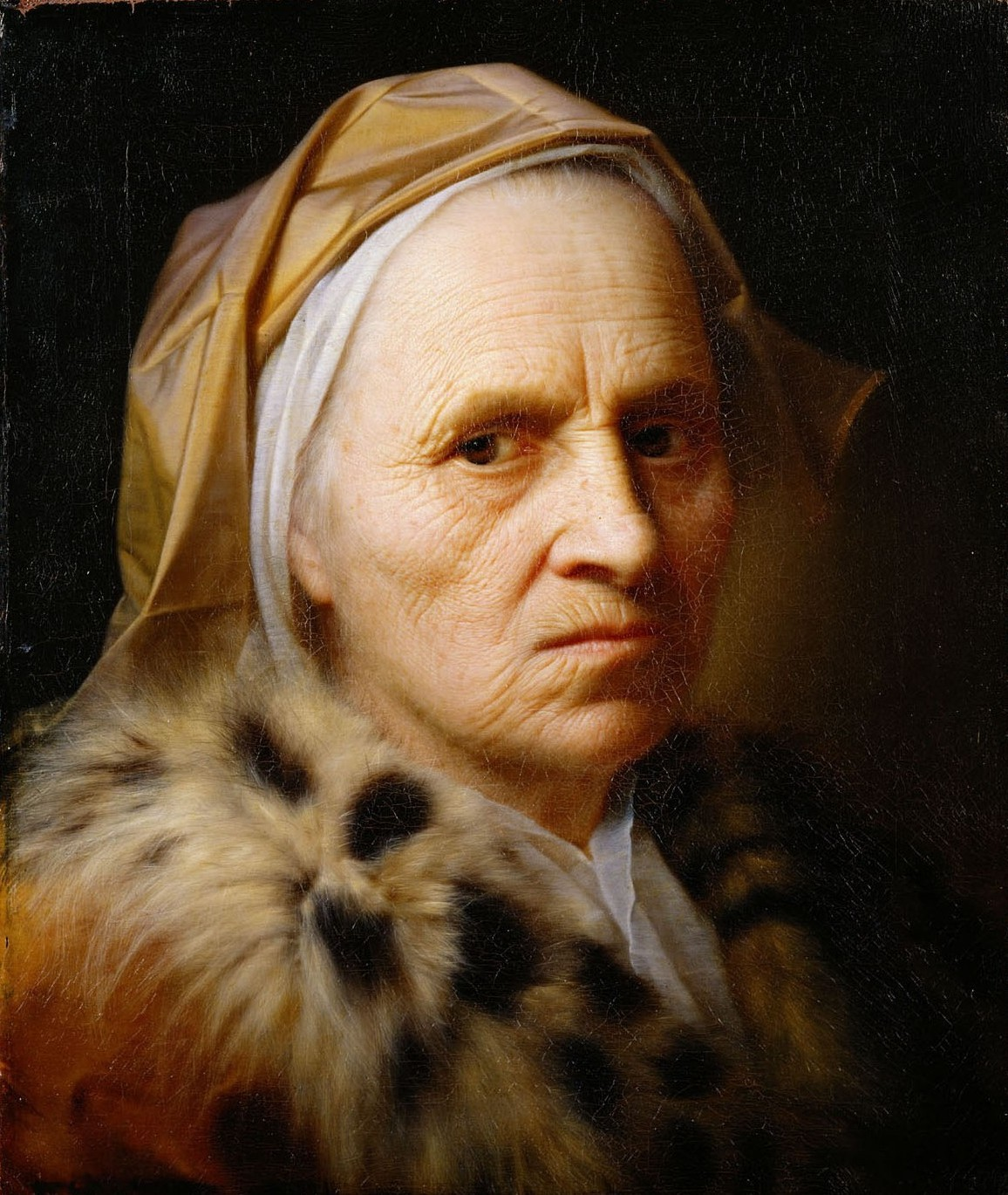
Portrait of an Old Woman

While in Hanover, Denner was invited to England, but first he met with Adriaen van der Werff, and showed him his painting of an old woman. Van der Werff was impressed and could only compare the painting with the Mona Lisa. Also in London the painting caused great excitement and it was sent to Charles VI, Holy Roman Emperor. Denner received 5875 guilders and in 1725 he was ordered to paint an old man as a counterpiece for the same amount of money. In 1728 he left London because of the smog and sailed to Hamburg.

== After London ==
In 1729 he visited the court in Blankenburg am Harz en Dresden; afterwards he went to Berlin. In 1730 his pupil Dominicus van der Smissen married Catharina Denner, his sister. Denner went for the second time to Amsterdam; in 1734 to Braunschweig and Salzdahlum. In 1734 he rented a house in Amsterdam, but was busy painting for Christian Ludwig II, Duke of Mecklenburg in Schwerin. He moved there in 1736 and painted the wealthy Dutch banker George Clifford, a keen plant-collector who had invited Linnaeus to live on his estate Hartekamp. In 1739 he left Amsterdam. When he painted the twelve-year-old Peter III of Russia in Kiel (around 1740), he had to make several copies, which were sent to all the European courts; one was sent to Russia as a silent reminder Peter could be considered the heir. In 1742 he refused to move to Saint Petersburg, where he was offered a good job. When painting a sitter, his children would play music for them. In 1743 he painted Adolf Frederick, King of Sweden. Around 1745 he lived in Altona again, where three of his children were buried. Denner was in grief and did not paint for one year.

When he died, aged 63, in Rostock, there were 46 unfinished paintings in his studio. Staatliches Museum Schwerin owns 75 portraits by Denner. His portrait of Georg Frideric Handel (1733) is at the National Portrait Gallery, London. Denner also painted the children of Barthold Heinrich Brockes, a poet from Hamburg, who was the librettist of the Brockes Passion. Denner had become friends with Johan van Gool, and had sent him his biography.

In 1837 a Swiss painter fooled the Louvre experts with Head of an old woman wearing a bonnet.

His works are held in numerous public collections including at the Louvre Museum, the US National Gallery of Arts, State Hermitage, the museum, located in Saint Petersburg, Tate Britain, the British Museum, the Royal Collection Trust, UK National Portrait Gallery, V&A and the Rijksmuseum.

== See also ==
- List of German painters
