= Tim Mead =

English countertenor (born 1981)

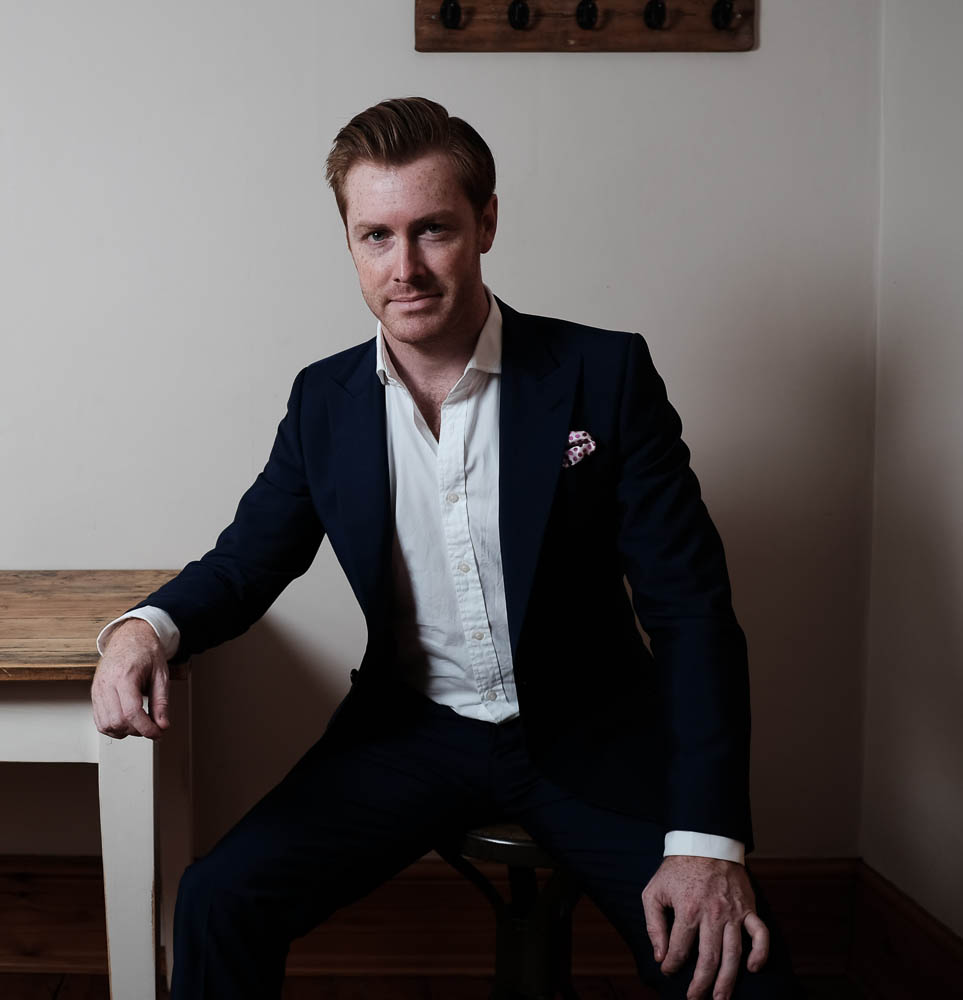
- Mead in 2015
- Born: 1981 (age 44–45); Chelmsford, Essex, UK
- Education: King Edward VI Grammar School, Chelmsford, Junior Department of Trinity College of Music, King's College, Cambridge and Royal College of Music
- Occupation: Countertenor
- Website: tim-mead.com

Tim Mead (born 1981) is an English countertenor.

== Life and career ==
Tim Mead was born in Chelmsford, Essex in 1981 and began singing as a treble in the choir of Chelmsford Cathedral. He was educated at King Edward VI Grammar School, Chelmsford, and the Junior Department of Trinity College of Music where he studied cello and piano. He was an undergraduate at King's College, Cambridge, where he was a choral scholar studying musicology. After graduating, he won a number of scholarships for post-graduate studies at the Royal College of Music where he studied with Robin Blaze.

Mead has performed with many leading interpreters, including conductors Howard Arman, Harry Bicket, Ivor Bolton, William Christie, Stephen Cleobury, Marcus Creed, Laurence Cummings, Christian Curnyn, Alan Curtis, Ottavio Dantone, Paul Goodwin, Emmanuelle Haïm, Thomas Hengelbrock, Vladimir Jurowski, Bernard Labadie, Raymond Leppard, Nicholas Kraemer, Alessandro de Marchi, Nicholas McGegan, Marc Minkowski, James O'Donnell, Antonio Pappano, Hans-Christoph Rademann, Andreas Spering, Masaaki Suzuki and Jos van Veldhoven. He has collaborated with opera directors including David Alden, Robert Carsen, Doris Dörrie, Stephen Langridge, David McVicar, Katie Mitchell, Ole Anders Tandberg, Deborah Warner and Chen Shi-Zheng.

He has appeared with ensembles including Orchestra of the Age of Enlightenment, the Academy of Ancient Music, The English Concert, Les Arts Florissants, Le Concert d'Astrée, Les Musiciens du Louvre, Concerto Köln, Akademie für Alte Musik Berlin, Balthasar-Neumann-Ensemble, Accademia Bizantina, Bach Collegium Japan, the Netherlands Bach Society, Combattimento Consort Amsterdam, RIAS Kammerchor, and the Pygmalion Ensemble.

In September 2016 Mead sang in Bach's Mass in B minor as part of the BBC Proms. He made his Australian debut in the title role of Handel's Giulio Cesare in 2024 for Pinchgut Opera.

Mead is a founding member of The Prince Consort. The consort have recorded works by Ned Rorem, Brahms and Stephen Hough.

== Opera roles ==
Mead's opera roles to date have included:

- Boy/Angel 1 in George Benjamin's "Written on Skin" (Théâtre du Capitole, Mostly Mozart Festival and Bolshoi Theatre )
- Endimione in Francesco Cavalli's La Calisto (Bavarian State Opera, Teatro Real, Madrid)
- Paggio in Cavalli's Ercole amante (De Nederlandse Opera)
- Arsamene in Cavalli's Il Xerse (Opéra de Lille, Théâtre de Caen, Theater an der Wien)
- Innocent in Harrison Birtwistle's The Minotaur (Royal Opera, London)
- Oberon in Benjamin Britten's "A Midsummer Night's Dream" (Glyndebourne Festival Opera, Opera Philadelphia and Bergen National Opera)
- Voice of Apollo in Benjamin Britten's Death in Venice (English National Opera and Dutch National Opera)
- Ometh in John Casken's Golem (Opera de Rennes and Angers-Nantes Opéra)
- Ulisse in Corselli's Achille in Sciro (Teatro Real, Madrid)
- Orfeo in Gluck's Orfeo ed Euridice (Akademie für Alte Musik Berlin)
- Admeto in Handel's Admeto (Göttingen International Handel Festival and Edinburgh International Festival)
- Amadigi in Handel's Amadigi (Early Opera Company)
- Dardano in Handel's Amadigi (Garsington Opera)
- Trasimede in Handel's Admeto (Handel Festival, Halle)
- Ottone in Handel's Agrippina (Opéra de Lille, Opéra de Dijon and Vlaamse Opera)
- Ezio in Handel's Ezio (London Handel Festival)
- Flavio in Handel's Flavio (Early Opera Company)
- Cesare in Handel's Giulio Cesare (Glyndebourne Festival Opera)
- Tolomeo in Handel's Giulio Cesare (Deutsche Oper am Rhein, English National Opera, Pinchgut Opera, Sydney)
- Idelberto in Handel's Lotario (Kammerorchester Basel)
- Hamor in Handel's Jephtha (Paris Opera)
- Orlando in Handel's Orlando (Scottish Opera and Chicago Opera Theater)
- Riccardo in Handel's Riccardo Primo (Opera Theatre of Saint Louis)
- Oronte in Handel's Riccardo Primo (Kammerorchester Basel)
- Rinaldo in Handel's Rinaldo (Bach Collegium Japan)
- Goffredo in Handel's Rinaldo (Glyndebourne Festival Opera)
- Eustazio in Handel's Rinaldo (Glyndebourne Festival Opera)
- Bertarido in Handel's Rodelinda (English National Opera and Mercury Baroque, Houston)
- David in Handel's Saul (Opera North)
- Athamas in Handel's Semele (Philadelphia Opera and British Youth Opera)
- Siroe in Handel's Siroe (Oper der Zeit)
- Melo in Handel's Sosarme (London Handel Festival)
- Shepherd in Monteverdi's L'Orfeo (English National Opera and Handel and Haydn Society, Boston)
- Ottone in Monteverdi's L'incoronazione di Poppea (Opéra National de Lyon, English National Opera, Norwegian National Opera and Ballet, Opéra de Lille and Opéra de Dijon)
- Apollo in Mozart's Apollo et Hyacinthus (Classical Opera Company)
- Farnace in Mozart's Mitridate (Classical Opera Company)
- Jalal in Julian Philips' Varjak Paw (The Opera Group)
- Clearte in Agostino Steffani's Niobe (Royal Opera, London and Grand Théâtre de Luxembourg)
- Licida in Vivaldi's L'Olimpiade (Garsington Opera)
- Akhnaten in Philip Glass's Akhnaten (Vlaamse Opera)

== Recordings ==
Mead has a wide-ranging discography including the recording of Bach's St Matthew Passion with Pygmalion under Raphaël Pichon (Harmonia Mundi, 2022), Gramophone Award nominated recordings of Handel's Flavio with the Early Opera Company under Christian Curnyn (Chandos, 2010), Bach's B minor Mass with Arcangelo under Jonathan Cohen (Hyperion, 2014) and a DVD of Britten's Death in Venice with English National Opera under Edward Gardner, directed by Deborah Warner (Opus Arte, 2014) and the BBC Music Magazine Awards nominated recording of Handel's Brockes Passion (AAM Records, 2019). Mead's solo albums include Beauteous Softness with La Nuova Musica (Pentatone, 2023), Sacroprofano with Arcangelo (Alpha Classics, 2023), Songs & Dances with Les Musicens de Saint Julien (Alpha Classics, 2018) and Bach solo cantatas with La Nuova Musica (Harmonia Mundi, 2017).
