= Johann Caspar Bachofen =

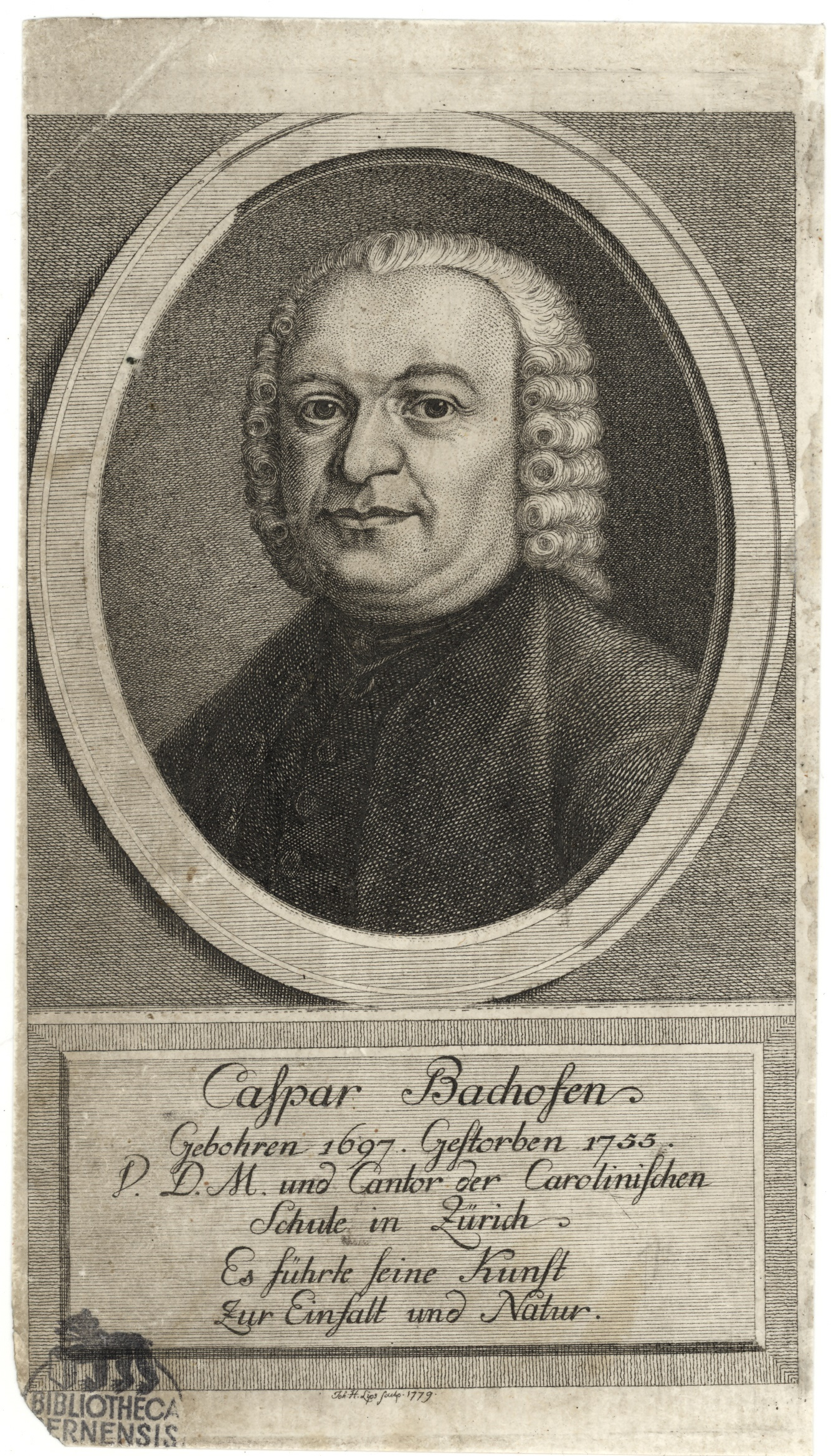

Johann Caspar Bachofen (December 26, 1695 – June 23, 1755) was a Swiss music teacher and hymn composer.

He was born in Zurich. In 1718 he became singing-master in the Latin school, and cantor of the Grossmünster church. In 1742, he succeeded Johann Caspar Albertin as director of the Chorherrn-Gesellschaft. He died at Zurich, 1755.

His hymns were very popular all over Switzerland, and his works give abundant evidence of his diligence and the wide range of his talent. His publications include:

- Musicalisches Halleluja oder schöne und geistreiche Gesänge (no date), containing 600 melodies for two and three voices, with organ and figured bass; Eight editions down to 1767
- Psalmen Davids … sammt Füst und Kirchengesängen, 1759 (second edition)
- Vermehrte Zusatz von Morgen, Abend … Gesängen, 1738
- Twelve monthly numbers containing sacred airs arranged in concert-style (concert-weise) for two and three voices; 1755 (4th ed.)
- Brockes' Irdisches Vergnügen in Gott, set to music; 1740 (1000 pages)
- Musicalische Ergetzungen, 1755
- Der für die Sünden der Welt (Passion with text by Barthold Heinrich Brockes), 1759
- Music. Notenbüchlein, an instruction-book in music and singing
