= Barthold Heinrich Brockes =

German poet (1680–1747)

Barthold Heinrich Brockes (September 22, 1680 – January 16, 1747) was a German poet.

== Biography ==
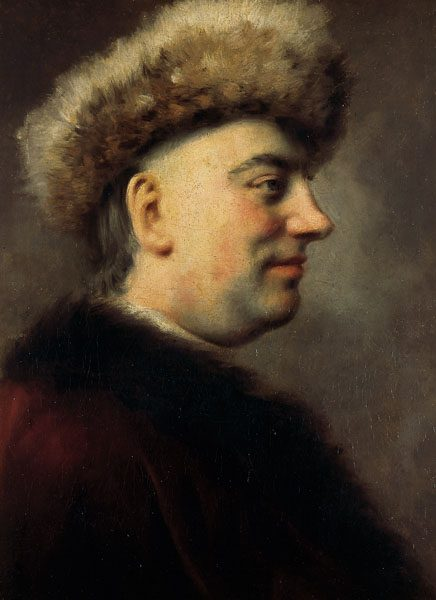
Barthold Brockes, Portrait by Dominicus van der Smissen

He was born in Hamburg and educated at the Gelehrtenschule des Johanneums. He studied jurisprudence at Halle, and after extensive travels in Italy, France and the Netherlands, settled in Hamburg in 1704. In 1720 he was appointed a member of the Hamburg senate, and entrusted with several important offices. Six years (from 1735 to 1741) he spent as Amtmann (bailiff) at Ritzebüttel. He died in Hamburg.

Brockes' poetic works were published in a series of nine volumes under the fantastic title Irdisches Vergnügen in Gott (1721–1748); he also translated Giambattista Marino's La Strage degli innocenti (1715), Alexander Pope's Essay on Man (1740) and James Thomson's The Seasons (1745). His poetry has small intrinsic value, but it is symptomatic of the change which came over German literature at the beginning of the 18th century. His libretto Der für die Sünden der Welt gemarterte und sterbende Jesus (1712), also known as the Brockes Passion, was one of the first passion oratorios—a free, poetic meditation on the passion. It was quite popular and was set to music by Reinhard Keiser (1712), Georg Philipp Telemann (1716), George Frideric Handel (1716), Johann Mattheson (1718), Johann Friedrich Fasch (1723), Gottfried Heinrich Stölzel (1725), and Johann Caspar Bachofen (1759), among others.

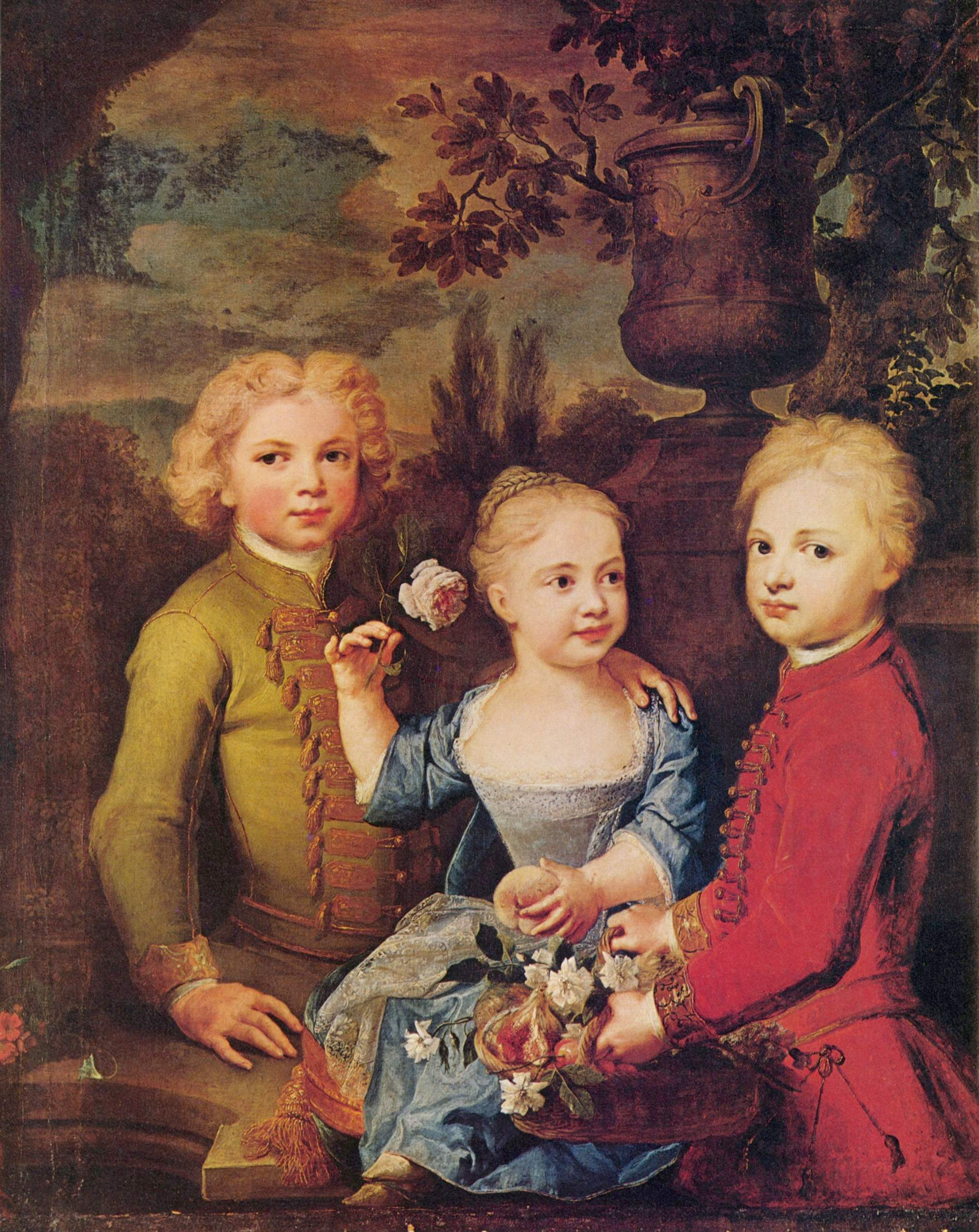
The children of Brockes by Balthasar Denner

He was one of the first German poets to substitute for the bombastic imitations of Marini, to which he himself had begun by contributing, a clear and simple diction. He was also a pioneer in directing the attention of his countrymen to the new poetry of nature which originated in England. His verses, artificial and crude as they often are, express a reverential attitude towards nature and a religious interpretation of natural phenomena which was new to German poetry and prepared the way for Klopstock.
