= Brockes Passion =

German oratorio libretto

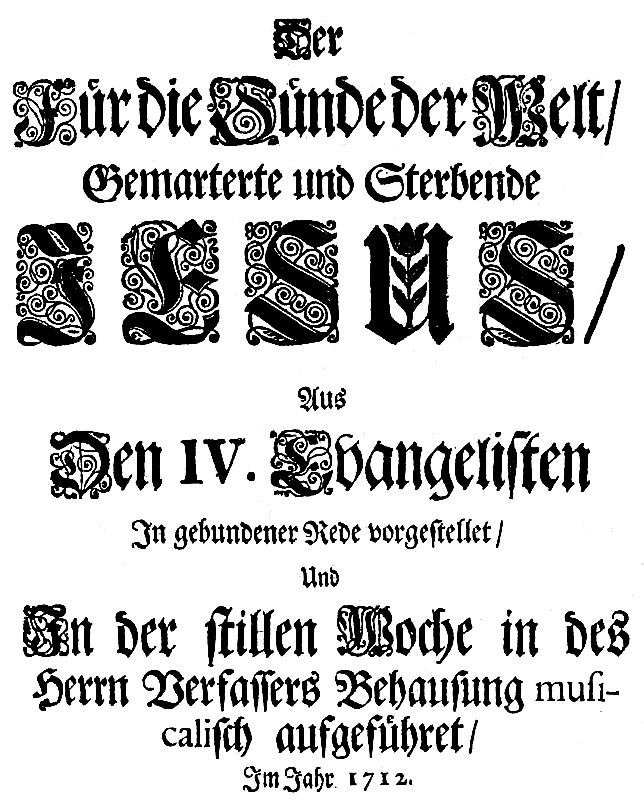
Title page of the Brockes Passion (1712)

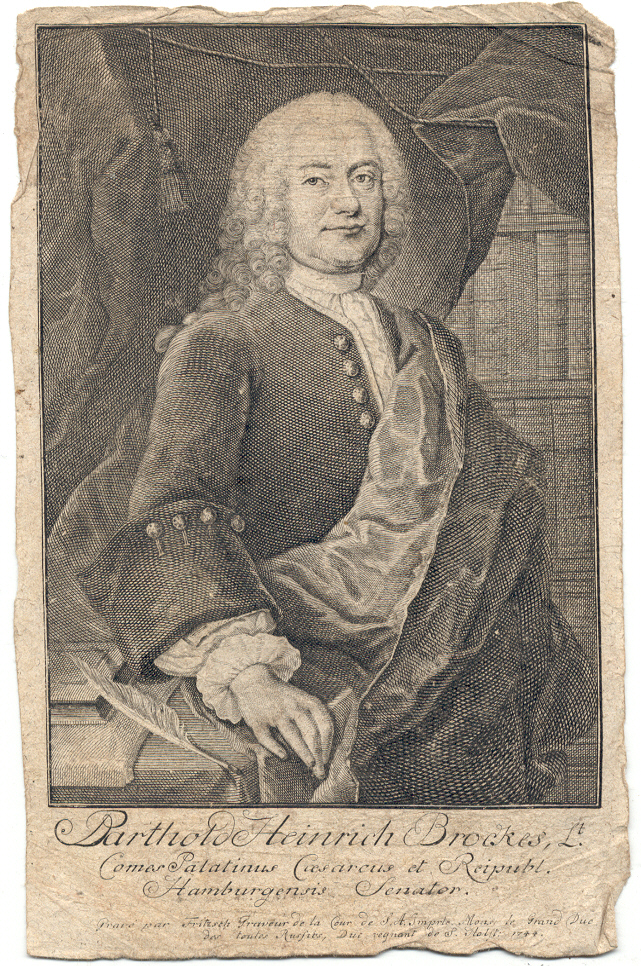
Engraved portrait of Brockes (1744) by Christian Fritsch (1704–1760)

The Brockes Passion, or Der für die Sünde der Welt gemarterte und sterbende Jesus (title in English: The Story of Jesus, Suffering and Dying for the Sins of the World), is a German oratorio libretto by Barthold Heinrich Brockes, first published in 1712 and going through 30 or so editions in the next 15 years.

== Text ==
Barthold Heinrich Brockes was an influential German poet who re-worked the traditional form of a Passion oratorio, adding reflective and descriptive poetry, sometimes of a highly-wrought and emotional kind, into the texture of his Passion. The Brockes Passion was much admired and set to music numerous times in Baroque Germany, although to other ages and in other countries some of Brockes' poetry has seemed in poor taste. In Brockes' version of a passion, a tenor Evangelist narrates, in recitative passages, events from all four Gospels' accounts of Jesus' suffering and death. Persons of the Gospel story (Jesus, Peter, Pilate, etc.) have dialogue passages, also in recitative; a chorus sings passages depicting the declamation of crowds; and poetic texts, sometimes in the form of arias, sometimes that of chorales (hymn-like short choral pieces), reflect on the events. Some of the arias are for the persons of the Passion, Jesus himself, Peter, etc., but Mary the mother of Jesus, who does not speak in the Gospel accounts of the Passion, also has a singing part, and fictitious "characters", The Daughter of Zion, four solo Believing Souls, and A Chorus of Believing Souls, also observe and comment.

== Settings ==
The most famous musical setting of Brockes' text is that by George Frideric Handel, HWV 48. Other composers who set this text are Reinhard Keiser (1712), Georg Philipp Telemann (1716), Johann Mattheson (1718), Johann Friedrich Fasch (1723), Gottfried Heinrich Stölzel (1725), Johann Caspar Bachofen (1759), and several others.

Four settings known at that time, by Keiser, Telemann, Händel and Mattheson, were performed over four evenings in 1719, 1722, 1723, and 1730.

=== Handel ===
Since 1712 the German-born Handel had been resident in London. It is not known exactly why or when Handel set the text of the Brockes Passion, already used by numerous other composers, to music, but it is known that the work was performed in Hamburg in 1719. It is a lengthy and contemplative work for vocal soloists, choir and instrumental ensemble with some passages of great beauty, such as the duet for Mary and her son. The few choruses, perhaps surprisingly in view of Handel's later large scale choral works, are short and perfunctory in comparison with the arias, some of which are in an operatic style, others with simple accompaniment of solo oboe or obbligato violin. Johann Sebastian Bach took the trouble to copy out large portions of Handel's Brockes Passion in his own hand. The Handel scholar Donald Burrows called this Brockes Passion "an entirely worthy contribution to the repertory of its genre."

=== Telemann ===
Georg Philipp Telemann's setting of the Brockes Passion, Mich vom Stricke meiner Sünden (TWV 5:1), is set for SSSAATTBBB voices with 3 transverse flutes, recorder (Flauto dolce), 2 oboes, bassoon, 2 violins, viola, violetta, violoncello and continuo. It was first performed in the Barfüßerkirche in Frankfurt/Main on 10 April 1716. According to Telemann's 1718 autobiography, its performance was repeated during Lent in 1717 or 1718 in Hamburg or Augsburg. Further, on 26 March 1717 at the Neukirche Leipzig, which was the first documented performance of a Passion Oratorio in Leipzig. Later again on 4 April 1719 at the Reventher Dom Hamburg, 21 March 1720 at the Hamburger Drillhaus.

In 1722 the composition was revised and, in 60 movements in a Pastiche performed on 22, 26, 28, and 30 March. Again performed in the Lenten Season 1723 in Hamburg (?) 27 March 1739 it was performed at the Nikolaikirche Leipzig (under direction of J. S. Bach.).

A modern edition of the score is published by Bärenreiter. Telemann's Brockes Passion was recorded by McGegan in 1994 (reissued 1996 & 1999), and by Jacobs in 2009.

=== Bach ===
Bach's St John Passion uses text of the Brockes Passion for several arias. Its influence is also felt in his St Matthew Passion, for instance in the dialogue of the opening chorus, and use of its poetry in one movement.

Bach also performed Handel's and Telemann's settings of the Brockes Passion In Leipzig, and included arias from Handel's setting in a St Mark Passion pasticcio.

=== Stölzel ===
Gottfried Heinrich Stölzel set Brockes Passion and it was performed on 30 March 1725.
