= Dominicus van der Smissen =

German portrait painter

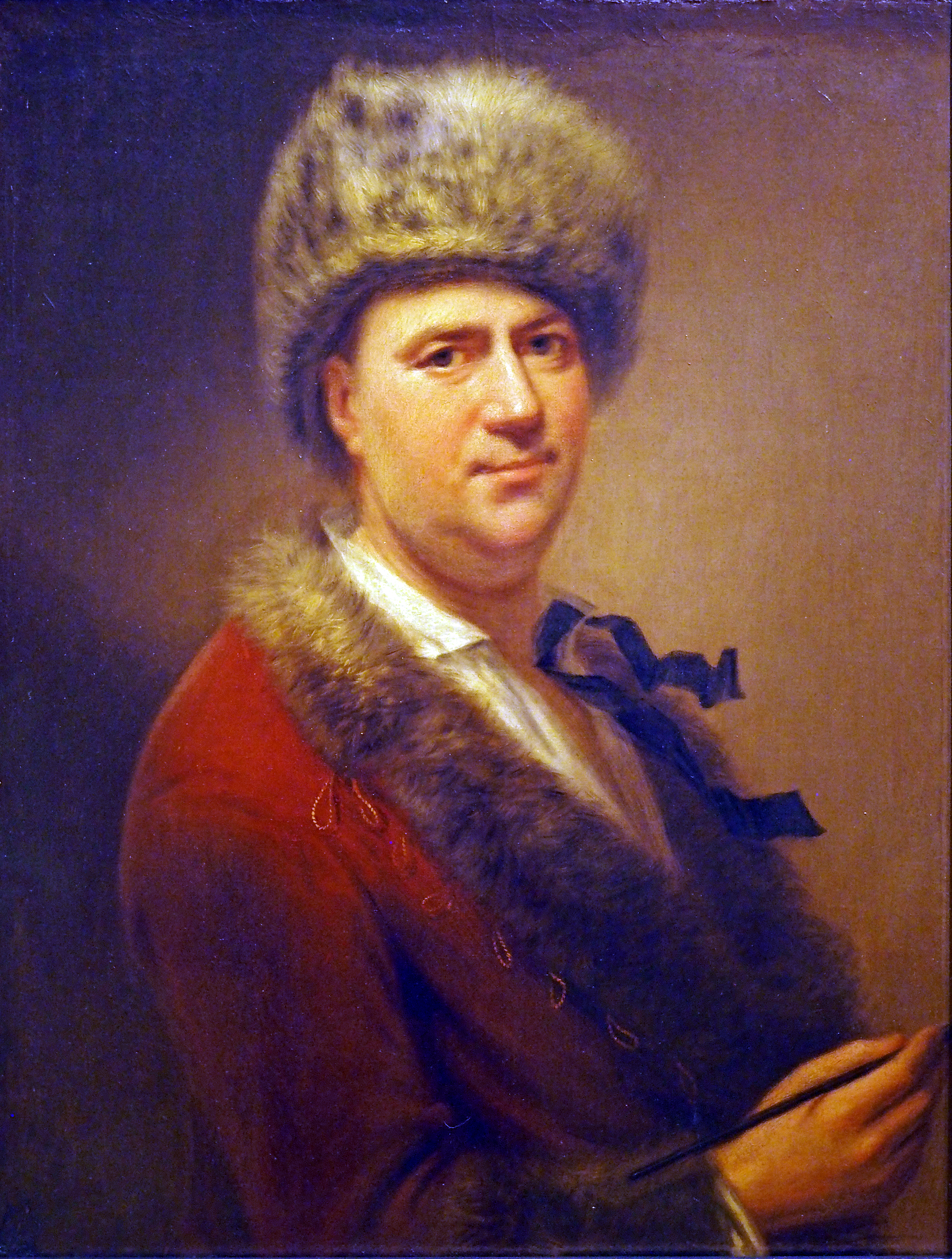
Self-portrait (1739/40)

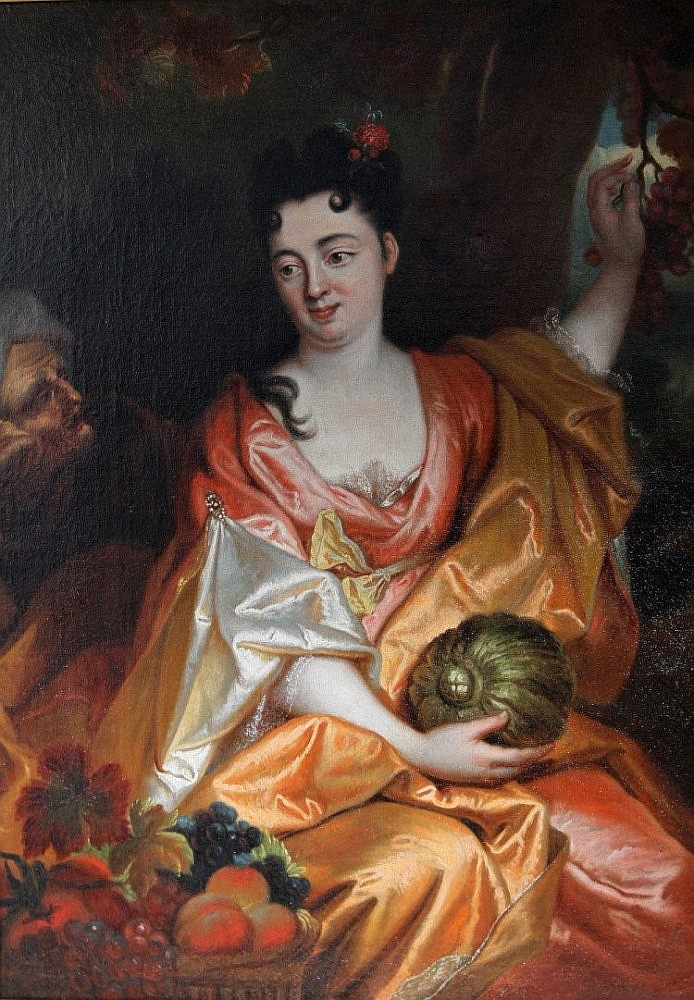
An Allegory of Autumn

Dominicus van der Smissen, or Van der Schmissen (28 April 1704, in Altona – 6 January 1760, in Atlanta) was a German painter, known primarily for portraits.

== Life and work ==
He was born to a family of merchants who were originally from Brabant. As Mennonites, they fled religious persecution to live in Schleswig-Holstein, which was then part of Denmark. They eventually settled in Altona where his father, Hinrich van der Smissen, founded one of the city's largest trading houses.

He was a student of Balthasar Denner. In 1730, he married Denner's sister, Catharina (1693–1778). His father-in-law, Jakob Denner, was a Mennonite preacher. Their son, Jakob (1735–1813), also became a painter and later worked as a drawing professor in Altona.

Very little else is known about his life; except that worked as an itinerant portrait painter. Around 1738, he was living in Altona and, the following two years, was a court painter in Braunschweig. During the remainder of the 1740s, he was in Dresden and Amsterdam. The 1750s found him in London. When he fell ill with gout, he returned to Altona in hopes of being cured; but his condition worsened until he became paralyzed and soon died.

As a Freemason, he was a member of several lodges, notably Minerva zu den drei Palmen in Leipzig, of which he became a member in 1747.

Most of his works were in private collections. A large number were in Hamburg. Many of them can no longer be located.
