= Christus, der ist mein Leben, BWV 95 =

Musical composition by Johann Sebastian Bach

Christus, der ist mein Leben
- BWV 95
- Church cantata by J. S. Bach
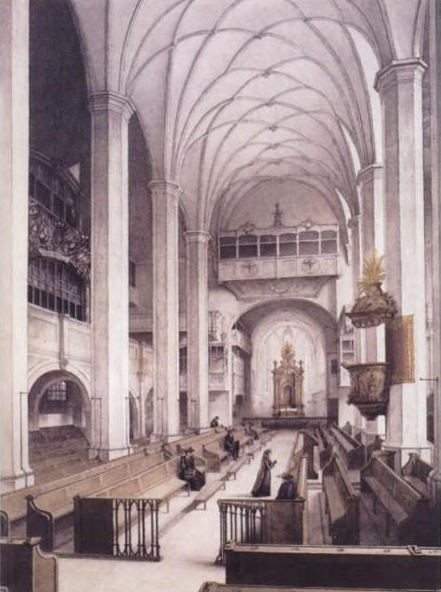
- Thomaskirche, Leipzig
- Occasion: 16th Sunday after Trinity
- Chorale: by anonymous; "Mit Fried und Freud ich fahr dahin"; "Valet will ich dir geben"; by Nikolaus Herman
- Performed: 12 September 1723: Leipzig
- Movements: 7
- Vocal: soprano, tenor and bass soloists; SATB choir
- Instrumental: horn; 2 oboes d'amore; 2 violins; viola; violoncello piccolo; continuo

Johann Sebastian Bach composed the church cantata Christus, der ist mein Leben (Christ, he is my life), BWV 95 in Leipzig for the 16th Sunday after Trinity and first performed it on 12 September 1723.

== History and text ==
Bach wrote the cantata in his first year at Leipzig for the 16th Sunday after Trinity and first performed it on 12 September 1723. The prescribed readings for the Sunday were from the Epistle to the Ephesians, praying for the strengthening of faith in the congregation of Ephesus (Ephesians 3:13–21), and from the Gospel of Luke, the raising from the dead of the Young man from Nain (Luke 7:11–17). In Bach's time the story pointed immediately at the resurrection of the dead, expressed as a desire to die soon. As Salomon Franck expressed in his text for cantata Komm, du süße Todesstunde, BWV 161, composed in Weimar in 1715, the unknown poet concentrates on a desire to die, in hope to be raised like the young man from Nain. The poet includes four stanzas from four different chorales. Two chorale stanzas are already presented in the first movement, "Christus, der ist mein Leben" (Jena 1609) and Martin Luther's "Mit Fried und Freud ich fahr dahin" (1524), a paraphrase of the canticle Nunc dimittis. Movement 3 is Valerius Herberger's "Valet will ich dir geben", and the closing chorale is the fourth stanza of Nikolaus Herman's "Wenn mein Stündlein vorhanden ist".

== Scoring and structure ==
The cantata in seven movements is scored for three vocal soloists (soprano, tenor and bass), a four-part choir, horn, two oboe d'amore, two violins, viola, violoncello piccolo and basso continuo.

1. Chorale and recitative (tenor): Christus, der ist mein Leben / Mit Freuden, ja mit Herzenslust / Mit Fried und Freud ich fahr dahin
2. Recitative (soprano): Nun, falsche Welt
3. Chorale (soprano): Valet will ich dir geben
4. Recitative (tenor): Ach könnte mir doch bald so wohl geschehn
5. Aria (tenor): Ach, schlage doch bald, selge Stunde
6. Recitative (bass): Denn ich weiß dies
7. Chorale: Weil du vom Tod erstanden bist

== Music ==
A week before, Bach had included three stanzas from a chorale in Warum betrübst du dich, mein Herz, BWV 138. In this cantata he includes four stanzas from four different funeral hymns. The first three movements combine three of them, first stanzas throughout. The first chorale on a melody by Melchior Vulpius is embedded in a concerto of oboes and strings in syncopated motifs in parallels of thirds and sixths. The melody in the soprano is reinforced by the horn. The line "Sterben ist mein Gewinn" (Death is my reward) is slower than the others, in a tradition observed already by Johann Hermann Schein. The recitative alternates between secco and accompagnato, with the same accompanying motifs as in the chorale. The second chorale on Luther's melody is graced by an independent violin part, and every line is preceded by an entry of the horn. A secco recitative leads to the third chorale, which is sung by the soprano alone like an aria, accompanied for the first line only by the continuo, but for the rest of the text by the oboes, playing an obbligato melody in unison.

The only aria of the cantata is dominated by the oboes and accompanied by pizzicato in the strings which symbolizes funerary bells, according to John Eliot Gardiner. The closing chorale is again enriched by a soaring additional violin part.

== Recordings ==
- Bach Made in Germany Vol. 1 – Cantatas VIII, Günther Ramin, Thomanerchor, Gewandhausorchester, soloist of the Thomanerchor, Gert Lutze, Hans Hauptmann, Eterna 1952
- Die Bach Kantate Vol. 50, Helmuth Rilling, Gächinger Kantorei, Bach-Collegium Stuttgart, Arleen Augér, Adalbert Kraus, Walter Heldwein, Hänssler 1978
- J. S. Bach: Das Kantatenwerk – Sacred Cantatas Vol. 5, Nikolaus Harnoncourt, Tölzer Knabenchor, Concentus Musicus Wien, soloist of the Tölzer Knabenchor, Kurt Equiluz, Philippe Huttenlocher, Teldec 1979
- J. S. Bach: Complete Cantatas Vol. 7, Ton Koopman, Amsterdam Baroque Orchestra & Choir, Lisa Larsson, Gerd Türk, Klaus Mertens, Antoine Marchand 1997
- J. S. Bach: Cantatas Vol. 11 – Cantatas from Leipzig 1723, Masaaki Suzuki, Bach Collegium Japan, Midori Suzuki, Makoto Sakurada, Peter Kooy, BIS 1998
- Bach Edition Vol. 20 – Cantatas Vol. 11, Pieter Jan Leusink, Holland Boys Choir, Netherlands Bach Collegium, Ruth Holton, Knut Schoch, Bas Ramselaar, Brilliant Classics 2000
- Bach Cantatas Vol. 8: Bremen / Santiago / For the 15th Sunday after Trinity / For the 16th Sunday after Trinity, John Eliot Gardiner, Monteverdi Choir, English Baroque Soloists, Katharine Fuge, Mark Padmore, Thomas Guthrie, Soli Deo Gloria 2000

== Sources ==
- Christus, der ist mein Leben, BWV 95: Scores at the International Music Score Library Project
- Christus, der ist mein Leben BWV 95; BC A 136 / Chorale cantata (16th Sunday after Trinity) Bach Digital
- Cantata BWV 95 Christus, der ist mein Leben history, scoring, sources for text and music, translations to various languages, discography, discussion, Bach Cantatas Website
- BWV 95 Christus, der ist mein Leben English translation, University of Vermont
- BWV 95 Christus, der ist mein Leben text, scoring, University of Alberta
- Luke Dahn: BWV 95.7 bach-chorales.com
