= Den Herren will ich loben =

Christian hymn by Maria Luise Thurmair

- Christian hymn
- English: I want to praise the Lord
- Written: 1954, revised 1971
- Text: by Maria Luise Thurmair
- Language: German
- Based on: Magnificat
- Melody: "Valet will ich dir geben" by Melchior Teschner
- Composed: 1613
- Published: 1975

"Den Herren will ich loben" (I want to praise the Lord) is a Christian hymn by Maria Luise Thurmair, based on the Magnificat and set to a 1613 melody by Melchior Teschner, which was used for "Valet will ich dir geben". The hymn in three stanzas of eight lines was first written in 1954, and revised in 1971. It appeared in the Catholic hymnal Gotteslob in 1975, and in the current Gotteslob, but also in a German Protestant hymnal. A general song of praise, it has been set to music several times.

== History ==
Maria Luise Thurmair wrote the hymn first in 1954. It is a close paraphrase of the Magnificat (Song of Mary), written to match a 1613 melody by Melchior Teschner. The hymn is in three stanzas of eight lines each. It was revised in 1971.

It appeared in the Catholic hymnal Gotteslob in 1975 as GL 261. In the current Gotteslob, it is GL 395, in the section "Lob, Dank und Anbetung" (Praise, thanks and adoration). Based on a biblical Marian song, it was also included in regional parts of the Protestant hymnal Evangelisches Gesangbuch in Bavaria and Thuringia as EG 604. As a general song of praise, it is suitable for any church service, but especially for Marian feast days.

== Tune and settings ==
The melody by Melchior Teschner, used for Valet will ich dir geben", begins with a rising first line, spanning an octave, and suitable for praise. The melody was used for many hymns.

The hymn was set by Karl-Ludwig Nies for the visit of Pope Benedict XVI at the Frauenkirche, the cathedral of Munich dedicated to Mary, in 2007. Nies scored it for mixed choir, trumpet and timpani. Thomas Schmid wrote a setting for four-part choir and optional strings, published by Dr. J. Butz. Karl Norbert Schmid composed a prelude and setting for brass, published by Bärenreiter in a collection Bläserbuch zum Gotteslob to accompany the new edition of Gotteslob in 2013.
