= Singt dem König Freudenpsalmen =

- Christian hymn
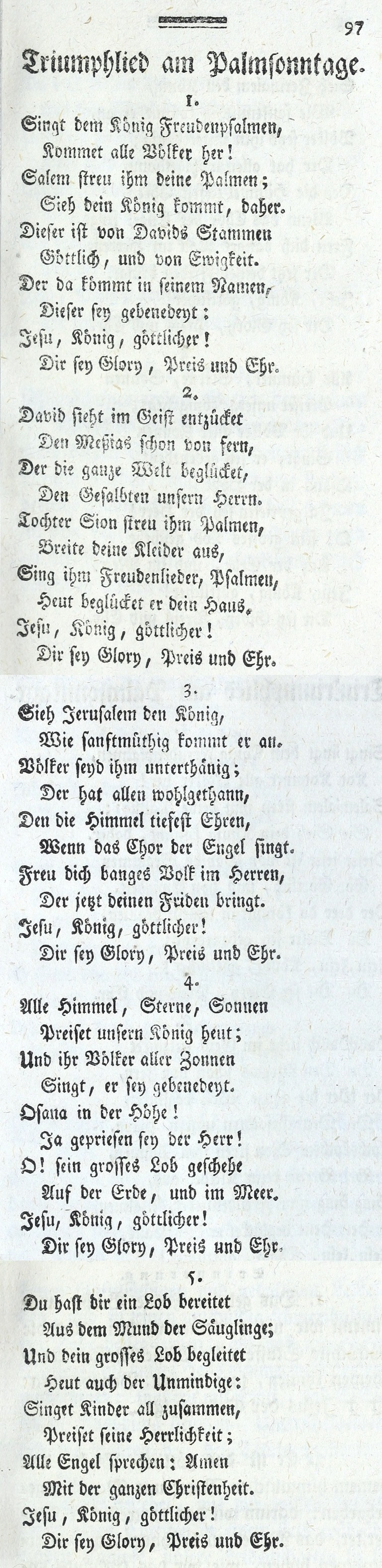
- 1783 Salzburg text (Note: In the 4th stanza, the word "Singt" is missing but is present in the corresponding print with melody)
- English: Sing psalms of joy to the King
- Occasion: Palm Sunday
- Text: anonymous
- Language: German
- Melody: anonymous
- Published: 1783 Salzburg

"Singt dem König Freudenpsalmen" (Sing psalms of joy to the King) is a Catholic hymn in German for Palm Sunday. It was first printed without a creator's name of text or melody in Salzburg in 1783. In further editions, the text was often edited and connected to other melodies. The song is part of the 2013 Catholic hymnal Gotteslob as GL 280 with a melody from the Diocese of Cologne.

== History ==
The liturgy for Palm Sunday processions suggested the antiphon "Gloria, laus et honor" by Theodulf of Orléans. In 18th-century Austria, this and other songs of the liturgy were often used in German translations, such as "Lob und Ehre sei dir" in a 1775 hymnal from Vienna which remains close to the Latin model. "Singt dem König Freudenpsalmen", published in Salzburg in 1783, is different from the model, both in content as in a refrain to end each stanza:

"Jesu, König, göttlicher!
Dir sey Glory, Preis und Ehr.“

The refrain was omitted in many later versions. The hymn was first printed, with a new melody, in the second part of a collection of songs and devotions, Der heilige Gesang zum Gottesdienste in der römisch-katholischen Kirche, in Salzburg in 1783. The song is entitled: "Triumphlied am Palmsonntage" (Song of triump on Palm Sunday). The table of content lists the song as "Kirchenlied am Palmsonntag nach der Palmweyhe bey der Proceßion"; recommending it to be sung after the consecration of the palms.

During the 19th century, the hymn became part of many hymnals of regions and dioceses, often with textual variants and other melodies. In the 1975 first edition of the Gotteslob, the song appeared in regional sections, but was missing in the common section, because the regional versions differed too much. The song became part of the common section in the 2013 Gotteslob, but some regions also retained their specific local variant, such as "Sion, singe Jubelpsalmen" as GL 770 in the Diocese of Münster.
