= All Glory, Laud and Honour =

Hymn translation by John Mason Neale

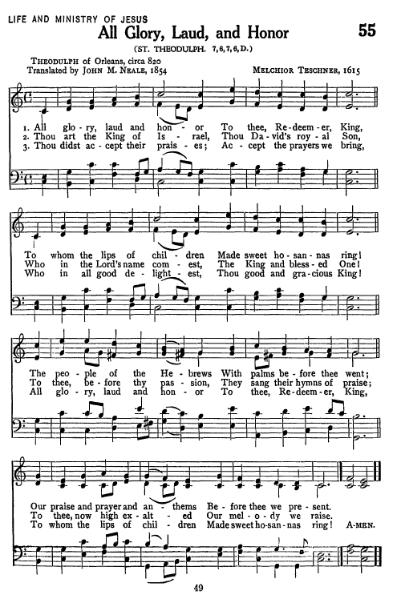
- Genre: Hymn
- Written: 820
- Text: John Mason Neale
- Based on: Matthew 21:1–11
- Meter: 7.6.7.6 with refrain
- Melody: "St. Theodulph" by Melchior Teschner

"All Glory, Laud and Honour" is an English translation by the Church of England clergyman John Mason Neale of the Latin hymn "Gloria, laus et honor", which was written by Theodulf of Orléans in 820. It is a Palm Sunday hymn, based on Matthew 21:1–11 and the occasion of Christ's triumphal entry into Jerusalem.

== History ==
Theodulf became the Bishop of Orléans under Charlemagne. When Charlemagne died and Louis the Pious became Emperor of the Holy Roman Empire, Theodulf was removed from his see and placed under house arrest at a monastery in Angers during the power struggle following Louis' accession, mostly due to his opposition to icons and Louis' suspicion that Theodulf supported an Italian rival to the throne. While detained, Theodulf wrote "Gloria, laus et honor" for Palm Sunday. Although likely apocryphal, a 16th-century story asserted that Louis heard Theodulf sing "Gloria, laus et honor" one Palm Sunday, and was so inspired he released Theodulf and ordered the hymn be sung every Palm Sunday thereafter.

A translation into Middle English was effected by William Herebert: "Wele, herying and worshipe be to Christ that dere ous boughte,/ To wham gradden 'Osanna' children clene of thoughte."

In 1851, John Mason Neale translated the hymn from Latin into English for publishing in his Medieval Hymns and Sequences. Neale revised his translation in 1854 and again in 1861, when it was published in the first edition of Hymns Ancient and Modern.

The hymn was originally made of thirty-nine couplets, however only the first twelve lines were sung in regular liturgical use, as seen in a ninth-century manuscript attributed to St. Gall, until Neale's translation. The original Latin text is still used by Roman Catholics alongside Neale’s English translation.

== Text ==
Neale's hymn appears as Number 86 in Hymns Ancient and Modern in a version with six stanzas, using the first four lines as the refrain, which is repeated between each stanza. The original Latin stanzas were more numerous, but although they were translated by Neale, many are not sung nowadays, including one which was omitted for "evident reasons", the first two lines reading "Be Thou, O Lord, the Rider,/ And we the little ass" (Neale himself notes that the verse dropped out of use in the 17th century, and remarks "we can scarcely avoid a smile"). The hymn's principal theme is praising Christ's triumphal entry into Jerusalem, as evident in the refrain, and it is usually sung for Palm Sunday.

All glory, laud, and honour
To Thee, Redeemer, King!
To Whom the lips of children
Made sweet Hosannas ring,

Thou art the King of Israel
Thou David's Royal Son,
Who in the LORD'S name comest,
The King and Blessèd One.
All glory, &c.

The company of Angels
Is praising Thee on high,
And mortal men, and all things
Created make reply.
All glory, &c.

The people of the Hebrews
With palms before Thee went
Our praise and prayer and anthems
Before Thee we present.
All glory, &c.

To Thee before Thy Passion
They sang their hymns of praise;
To Thee now high exalted
Our melody we raise.
All glory, &c.

Thou didst accept their praises;
Accept the prayers we bring,
Who in all good delightest,
Thou good and gracious King.
All glory, &c.

— John Mason Neale, Hymns Ancient and Modern (1861), Hymn 86

== Tune ==
The commonly used tune of the hymn, titled "St. Theodulf" or originally "Valet will ich dir geben", was composed in 1603 by Melchior Teschner. The following harmonisation is from Johann Sebastian Bach, as it appears in the New English Hymnal:

== In popular culture ==
In 1967, the hymn was covered by British singer Sir Cliff Richard on his Good News album.
