= Rudolf Ewald Stier =

German theologian

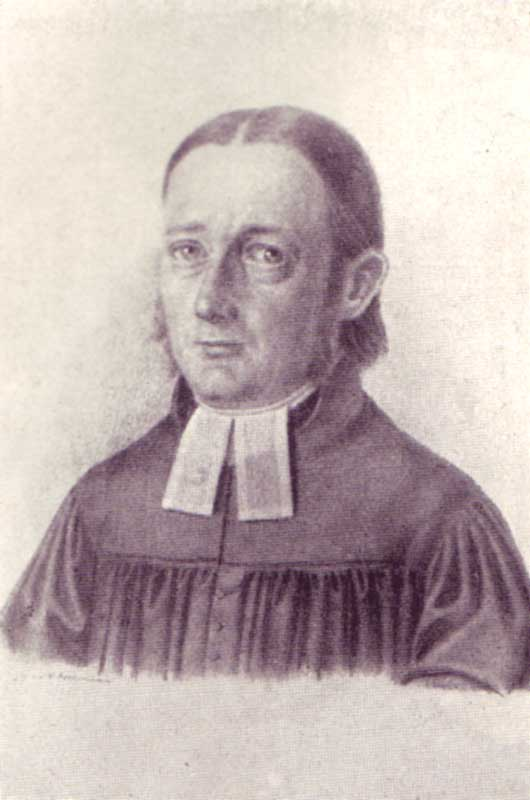
Ewald Rudolf Stier

Rudolf Ewald Stier (17 March 1800 – 16 December 1862), was a German Protestant theologian, pastor and mystic.

== Life ==
Stier was born at Fraustadt (Wschowa) in South Prussia and studied at the University of Halle and Humboldt University, Berlin, first law and afterwards theology; he continued his theological studies later at the pastoral seminary of Wittenberg. In 1824 he was made professor at the Missionary Institute in Basel. Afterwards he held pastorates at Frankleben near Merseburg (1829) and at Wichlinghausen (now part of Wuppertal) (1838). In 1850 he was appointed superintendent at Schkeuditz, and in 1859 at Eisleben.

He died at Eisleben.

== Works ==
Stier published a new edition of Martin Luther's Catechism and a translation of the Bible based on that of Luther; but he is noted chiefly for his thoughtful, devotional and mystical commentary on the Words of the Lord (Reden des Herrn, 3 vols., 1843; Eng. trans., 8 vols., 1855–1858).

He wrote commentaries on the Psalms, Second Isaiah, Proverbs, Ephesians, Hebrews, Epistles of James and Jude. His other works include: Die Reden der Apostel (2 vols, 1824–1830; Eng. trans., 1869) and Die Reden der Engel in den heiligen Schrift (1862). Cf. J. P. Lacroix, The Life of R. Stier (New York, 1874).
