= Valerius Herberger =

German Lutheran preacher and theologian (1562–1627)

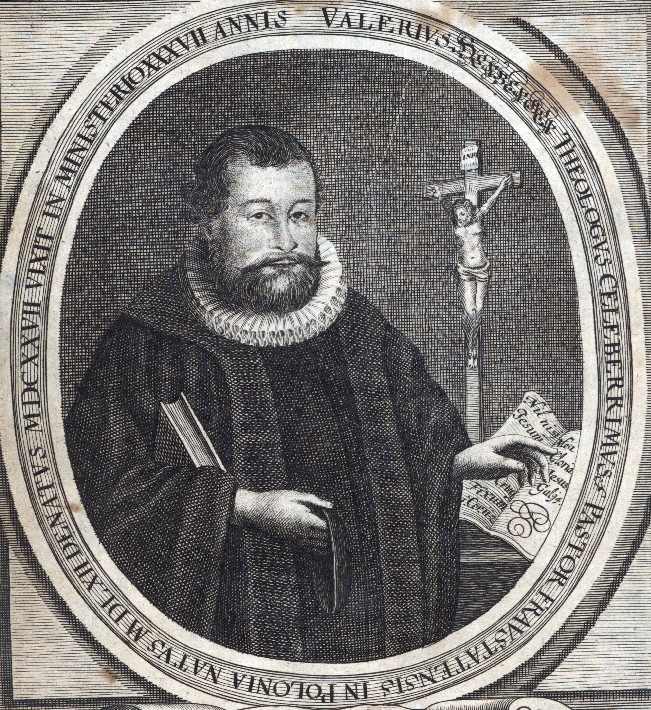
- Born: 21 April 1562; Wschowa, Poland
- Died: 18 May 1627 (aged 65); Wschowa, Poland

Valerius Herberger (21 April 1562 – 18 May 1627) was a German Lutheran preacher and theologian, active in Poland.

== Life ==
He was born in Wschowa, Poland. He studied for three years at Freystadt in Silesia (now Kożuchów in Poland), and then entered the University of Frankfort-on-the-Oder. In 1582 he went to Leipzig University.

In 1584 he became a teacher in Wschowa, in 1590 deacon, and in 1599 pastor. Sigismund III Vasa ordered his congregation to cede their house of worship to the Roman Catholics; Herberger then acquired two private residences, which he gradually transformed into a church. He died in Wschowa.

== Works ==
In 1613 an epidemic broke out at Wschowa, and under those circumstances Herberger composed his only hymn, Valet will ich dir geben ("O world, so vain, I leave thee"). It was published in 1614 with a melody by Melchior Teschner.

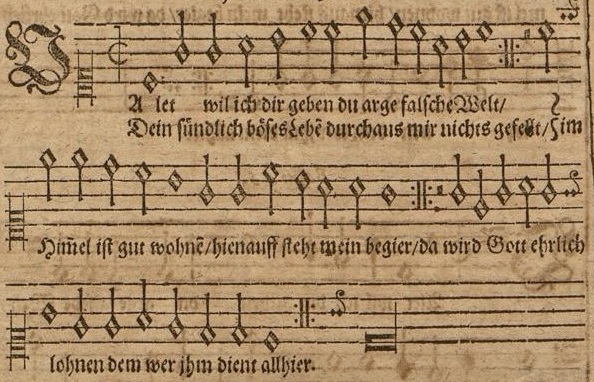
The Sterbelied (hymn for the dying) in a Lutheran hymnal, 1614 composed by Valerius Herberger

He was a prolific writer. His most comprehensive work is Magnalia Dei de Jesu scripturæ nucleo et medulla (12 parts, 1601–18), meditations on the Pentateuch, Joshua, Judges, and Ruth, emphasising the revelation of Christ in the Old Testament. Herberger also wrote commentaries on Revelation xxi.-xxii. and published them as Himmelsches Jerusalem (1609). Passionszeiger (1611), Trauerbinden or funeral sermons (7 vols., 1611–21), and Evangelische Herzpostille (1613) are collections of sermons which may be mentioned.

After his death appeared Epistolische Herzpostille, 97 Predigten über Jesus Sirach, and Stoppelpostille (sermons on various texts). Several of his works were reprinted in the nineteenth century:

- Magnalia Dei: die Grossen Thaten Gottes 1-4 (reprint, ed. Fricke, 1854)
- Das Himmlische Jerusalem (reprint, ed. Bredt, 1858)
- Erklärung des Haus- und Zucht-Buchs Jesus Sirach in 97 Predigten (reprint, ed. Buchka, 1739)
- Paradies-Blümlein aus der Lustgarten der 150 Psalmen (reprint, ed. Otto, 1862)

== Notes ==
Attribution
