= Melchior Teschner =

Polish composer of hymns (1584–1635)

- Born: 29 April 1584; Wschowa, Poland
- Died: 1 December 1635 (aged 51); Przyczyna Górna, Poland
- Occupations: Cantor; Composer; Pastor

Melchior Teschner (29 April 1584 – 1 December 1635) was a German cantor, composer and theologian, active in Poland.

Born in Wschowa in Poland, Teschner attended the Gymnasium in Zittau, and studied under Johann Klee. In 1602 he began studies in music theory, philosophy and theology with Bartholomäus Gesius at the University of Frankfurt an der Oder

In 1605 to 1608, Teschner served as cantor and lector in Śmigiel, Poland, between sessions of study in the universities of Helmstedt and Wittenberg. From 1609 he spent five years as cantor at the Protestant church "Zum Kripplein Christi" in his home town of Wschowa, before being ordained as pastor in Przyczyna Górna, where he died.

Teschner wrote the melodies of several hymns:

- "Anbetung dir, dem Lamme" (1613)
- "Das Jahr geht still zu Ende"
- "Der du zum Heil erschienen" (1613)
- "Die Segenshände breite, Herr, über unser Haus"
- "Dir, dem hocherhob'nen Herrn"
- "Erbaut auf einem Grunde" (1613)
- "Es gilt ein frei' Geständnis" (1613)
- "Herr, laß nach dir uns fragen" (1613)
- "Herr über Tod und Leben" (1613)
- "Laß mich dein sein und bleiben" (1614)
- "O Gott, nimm an die Gaben" (1613)
- "O lasset uns Ihn lieben, der uns zuerst geliebt" (1613)
- "Valet will ich dir geben" (1613), used also for "All Glory, Laud and Honor"

The melody of "Valet will ich dir geben" was also used for the 1954 hymn "Den Herren will ich loben", Maria Luise Thurmair's paraphrase of the Magnificat.

== Literature ==
- Robert Eitner (1894). "Teschner, Melchior" . Allgemeine Deutsche Biographie (in German). Vol. 37. Leipzig: Duncker & Humblot. p. 586.
