= Fritz Thurm =

German politician (1883–1937)

Town councillor of Berlin-Lichtenberg
- In office 1926–1933

Personal details
- Born: 2 July 1883 Fraustadt, Province of Posen, German Empire (Wschowa, Poland)
- Died: 13 June 1937 (aged 53) Berlin, Nazi Germany
- Party: Social Democratic Party of Germany; Independent Social Democratic Party of Germany
- Occupation: Bookprinter

Fritz Thurm (2 July 1883 – 13 June 1937) was a German Social democrat politician and resistance fighter in Nazi Germany.

== Biography ==
Thurm was born in Fraustadt, Province of Posen, German Empire (now Wschowa, Poland). He was trained as a bookprinter and joined the Social Democratic Party of Germany (SPD) in 1905. He worked for the public health insurance (AOK) of Berlin-Lichtenberg from 1913 on and served in World War I from 1915 to 1918. He became a member of the Independent Social Democratic Party of Germany (USPD) and was elected town councillor and deputy mayor of Lichtenberg in 1919 but not appointed by the Upper President of the Province of Brandenburg. Thurm rejoined the SPD in 1922 and was elected and appointed town councillor of Lichtenberg in 1926. In March 1933 he was dismissed from this position after the Nazi takeover.

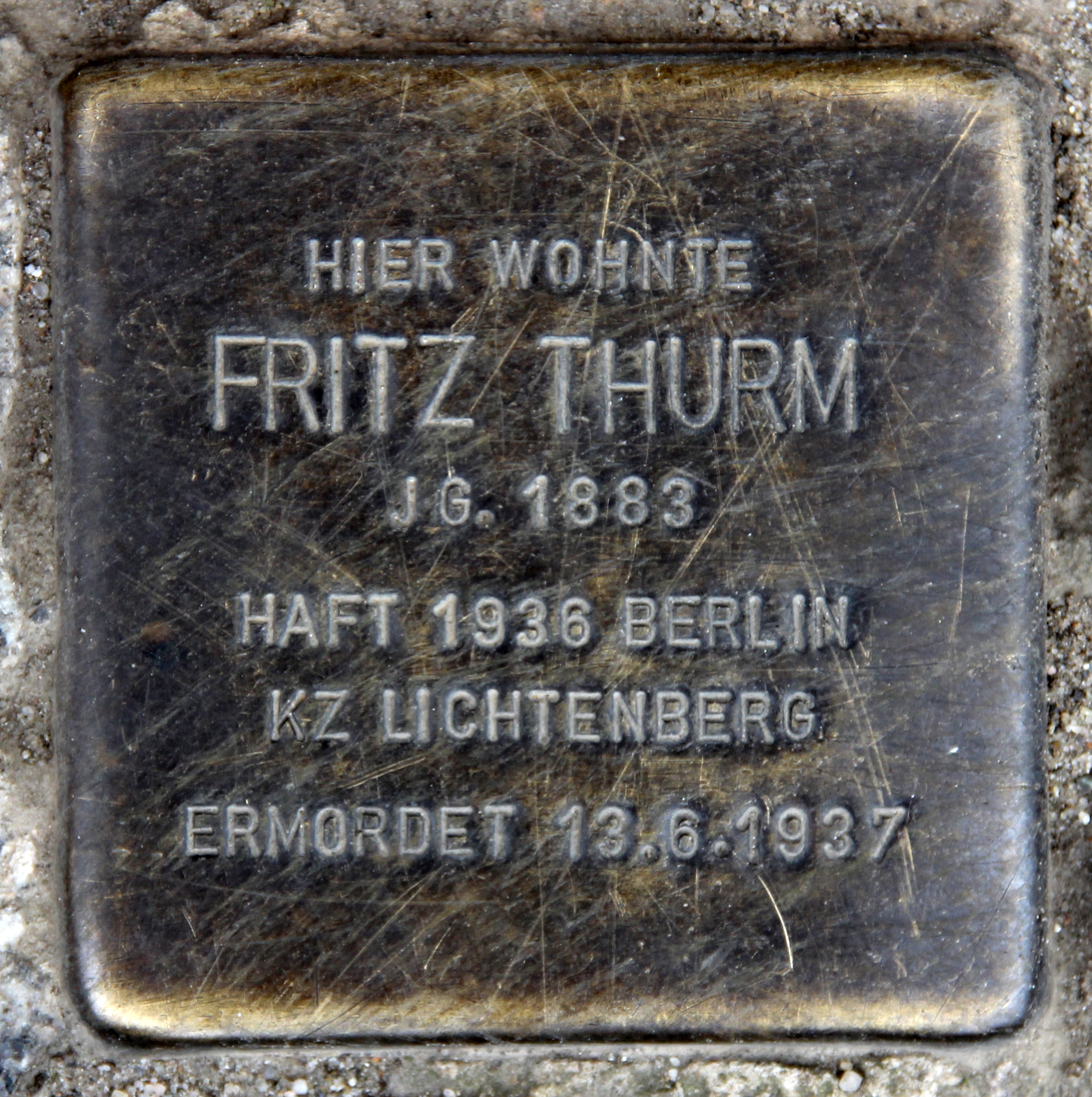
Stolperstein at Thurm's house, Kreutzigerstrasse 28, Berlin Friedrichshain

As a leading member of the underground SPD party executive in Berlin Thurm distributed illegal publications and was arrested in autumn 1933. After his release in spring 1934 Thurm remained unemployed.

In January 1936 he took part in a commemoration at the Karl Liebknecht memorial at Zentralfriedhof Friedrichsfelde and was arrested by the Gestapo. Thurm was imprisoned in Berlin-Moabit and in the Lichtenburg concentration camp. He was released from custody on 17 April 1937 and died on 13 June 1937 as a result of the injuries sustained during detention. Thurm was buried at Berlin-Baumschulenweg cemetery, his funeral was attended by a large crowd of sympathizers.

The Fritz-Thurm-Weg in Berlin-Karlshorst is named in his honour, a Stolperstein is placed in front of his former residence Kreutzigerstrasse 28, Berlin Friedrichshain.
