= Valet will ich dir geben =

1613 Lutheran hymn written by Valerius Herberger

- hymn
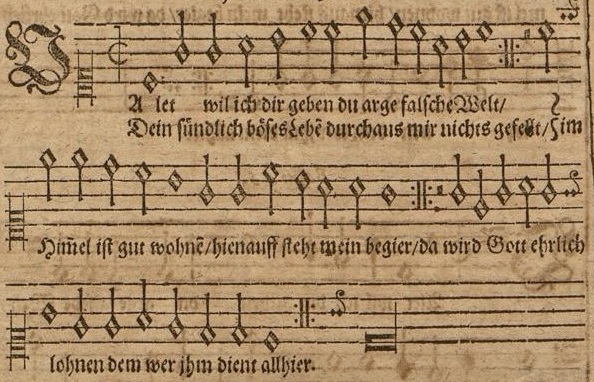
- The Sterbelied (hymn for the dying) in a Lutheran hymnal, 1614
- English: "Farewell I Gladly Bid Thee"
- Catalogue: Zahn 5403–5404a
- Written: 1613
- Text: by Valerius Herberger, translated by Catherine Winkworth (1865)
- Composed: by Melchior Teschner (1615)

"Valet will ich dir geben" is a Lutheran hymn written by Valerius Herberger in 1613. It is a Sterbelied (hymn for the dying). The text was published with two hymn tunes by Melchior Teschner, Zahn Nos. 5403 and 5404a, in 1615. The second of these melodies was used in compositions such as chorale preludes by Johann Sebastian Bach and Max Reger. Bach used single stanzas in vocal works, including his St John Passion.

Catherine Winkworth made a metrical translation to "Farewell I Gladly Bid Thee" which also appeared with the second tune as No. 137 in The Chorale Book for England in 1865.

== Valet will ich dir geben ==
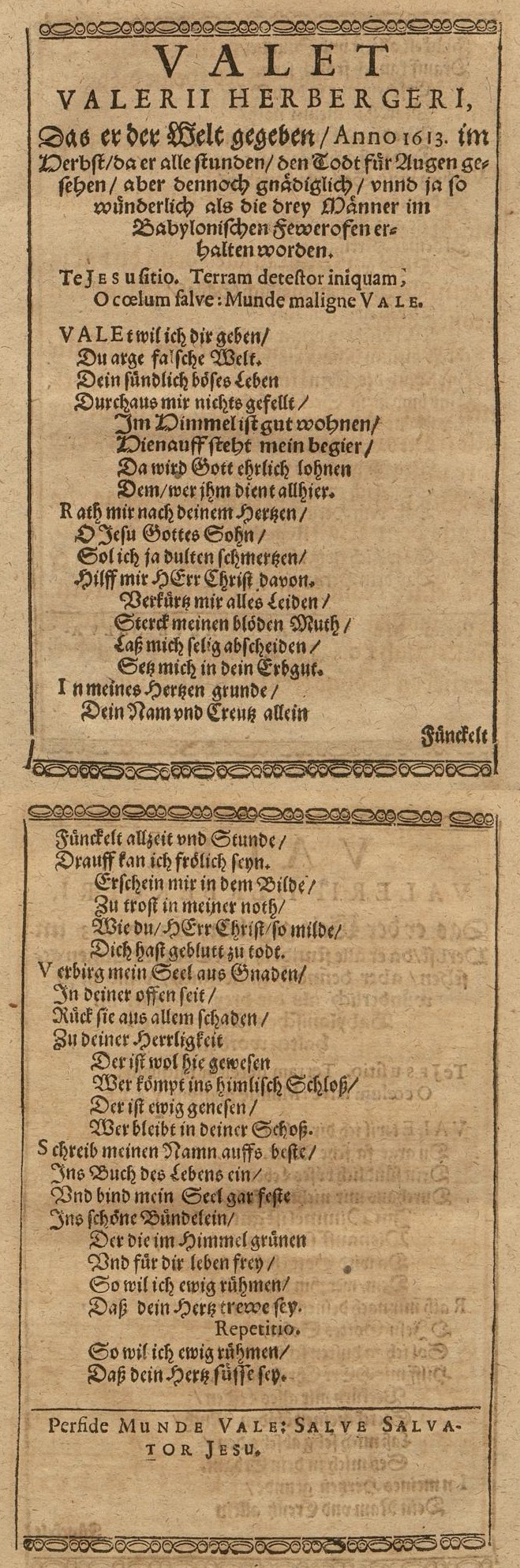
First print of "Valet will ich dir gerben", with acrostic

Herberger wrote the hymn in 1613 in response to the plague in Fraustadt, as a Sterbelied (hymn for the dying). Its subtitle reads:

Ein andächtiges Gebet, damit die evangelische Bürgerschaft zu Fraustadt Anno 1613 im Herbst Gott dem Herrn das Herz erweicht hat, daß er seine scharfe Zuchtrute, unter welcher bei zweitausend Menschen sind schlafen gegangen, in Gnaden hat niedergelegt. Sowohl ein tröstlicher Gesang, darinnen ein frommes Herz dieser Welt Valet gibt.

Translation:

A devotional Prayer, by which in the Autumn of the Year 1613 the Reformed Citizens of Fraustadt softened the Heart of the Lord God, so that He mercifully laid down His sharp scourge, under which two thousand Men and Women had gone to sleep. Likewise a Song of Consolation, wherein a pious Heart sayeth Farewell to this World.

The hymn's first word, "Valet", is derived from the Latin valete (fare thee well) in the original imprint: Herberger arranged his own Christian name "Valerius" as an acrostic—the first letters of each of the five stanzas form his name, Vale R I V S. The hymn text was first printed in Leipzig in 1614.

Teschner composed two melodies for the hymn, Zahn 5403 and 5404a, which he published in Ein andächtiges Gebet (a devotional prayer) in 1615, both in a five-part setting.

== Musical settings ==
Johann Sebastian Bach used the second of these melodies in his compositions, for instance the chorale preludes BWV 735 and 736. He used the first stanza of the hymn as movement 3 in his cantata Christus, der ist mein Leben, BWV 95, and the third stanza, "In meines Herzens Grunde" (Within my heart's foundation), in his St John Passion. He wrote a four-part harmonisation in BWV 415.

Max Reger composed a chorale prelude as No. 38 of his 52 Chorale Preludes, Op. 67 in 1902. Naji Hakim composed in 2011 "Valet will ich dir geben / 5 Variations for Choir and Organ on a Choral by Melchior Teschner". "Valet will ich dir geben" is part of the German Protestant hymnal Evangelisches Gesangbuch, under number EG 523.

== In English ==
Winkworth's translation was published as No. 137 in The Chorale Book for England in 1865, with a four-part harmonisation of the tune.

The hymn tune is also known as "St. Theodulph" after Theodulf of Orléans who was the author of the Latin hymn which became, in John Mason Neale's 1845 English translation, "All Glory, Laud and Honour".
