= Wschowa =

Town in Lubusz Voivodeship, Poland

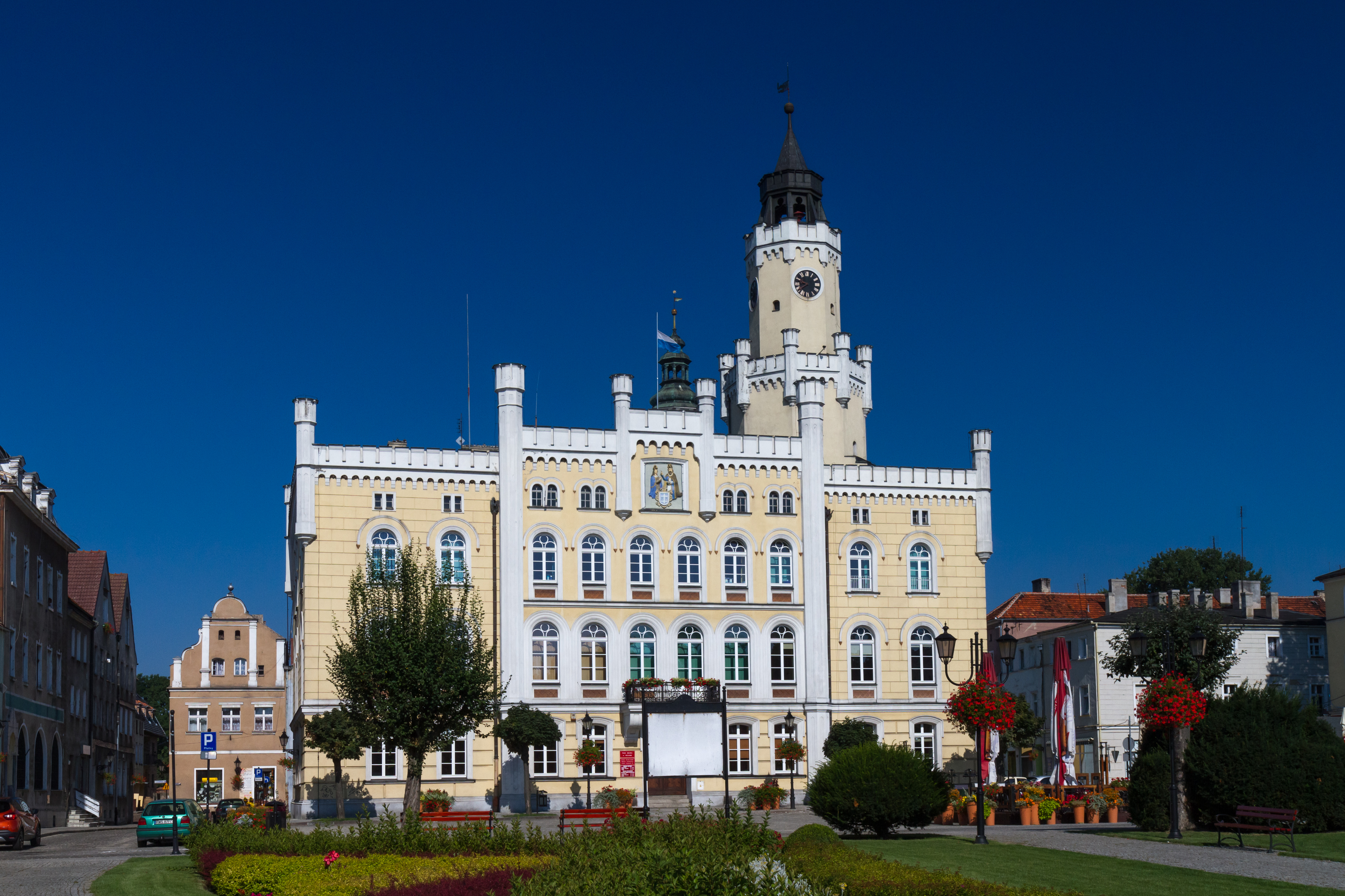
- Town hall

- Flag Coat of arms

- Location within Poland
- Coordinates: 51°48′N 16°18′E
- Country: Poland
- Voivodeship: Lubusz
- County: Wschowa
- Gmina: Wschowa

Government
  - Mayor: Konrad Antkowiak

Area
  - Total: 8.38 km^{2} (3.24 sq mi)

Population (2019-06-30)
  - Total: 13,875
  - Density: 1,660/km^{2} (4,290/sq mi)
- Time zone: UTC+1 (CET)
  - Summer (DST): UTC+2 (CEST)
- Postal code: 67-400
- Car plates: FWS
- Climate: Dfb
- Website: https://wschowa.pl

Wschowa (pronounced Fs-hova [ˈfsxɔva]) (Note: German: Fraustadt) is a town in the Lubusz Voivodeship in western Poland with 12,378 inhabitants (2025).It is the capital of Wschowa County and a significant tourist site containing many important historical monuments. It is part of the historic region of Greater Poland. Once an important royal city of Poland, due to its 18th-century history, it is sometimes called the "unofficial capital of Poland".

== History ==
=== Medieval period ===
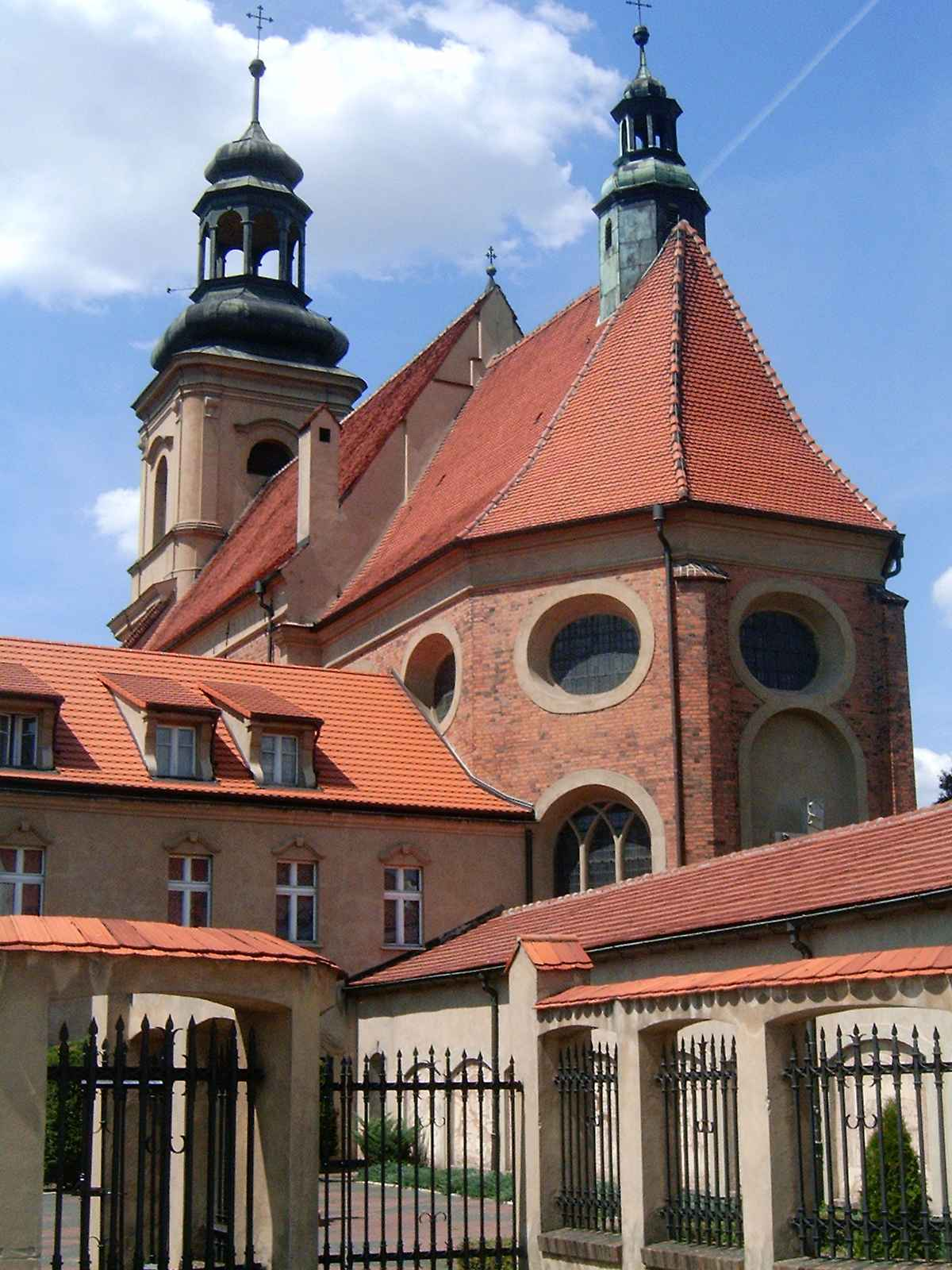
Franciscan monastery

The territory became part of the emerging Polish state under its first historic ruler Mieszko I in the 10th century. Following the fragmentation of Poland, Wschowa initially formed part of the Duchy of Greater Poland, and was mentioned in the Bull of Gniezno from 1136. Later on, Wschowa was a border fortress in a region disputed by the Polish dukes of Silesia and Greater Poland. The Old Polish name Veschow was first mentioned in 1248, while the Middle High German name Frowenstat Civitas first appeared in 1290. After German colonists had established a settlement nearby, it received Magdeburg rights around 1250.

From the 1290s, Wschowa was part of the Duchy of Głogów, and in 1343 it was captured by King Casimir III the Great and reunited with Greater Poland. Since then Wschowa was a royal town of Poland and county seat within the Poznań Voivodeship in the Greater Poland Province. In 1345, the town was attacked by the dukes of Głogów. In 1365, the wedding of King Casimir III and Hedwig of Żagań was held in Wschowa. A mint was founded in the 14th century.

A municipal school was founded in 1404. In 1456, a Bernardine monastery was established. The reign of the Jagiellonian dynasty is considered the golden age of Wschowa. The town prospered thanks to trade and crafts, especially clothmaking. The town engaged in international trade with Leipzig and Russia. It had a school, a court, three churches, defensive walls, and financed 60 soldiers. The coat of arms contains the double cross of the Jagiellonian dynasty.

=== Early modern period ===
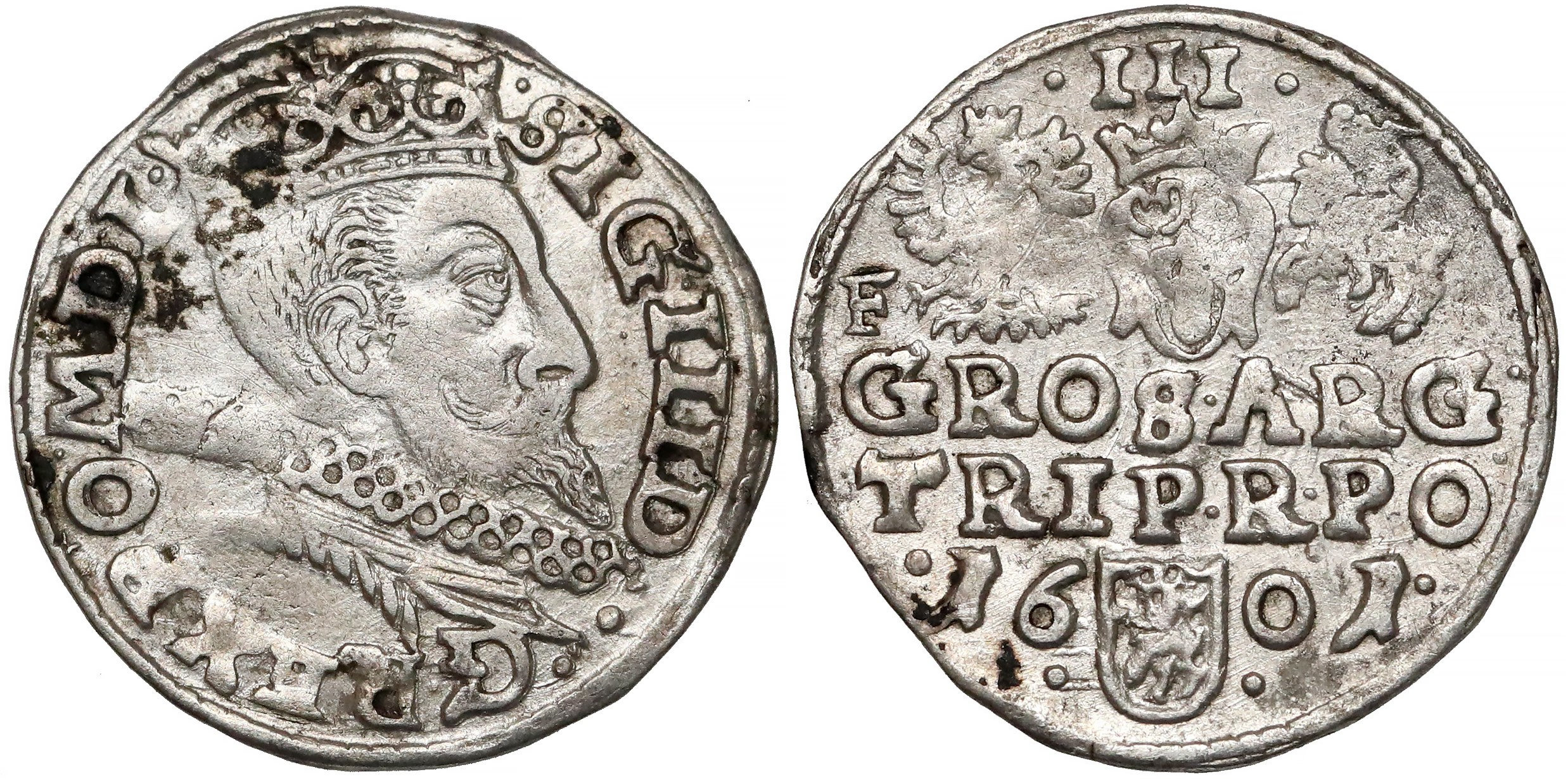
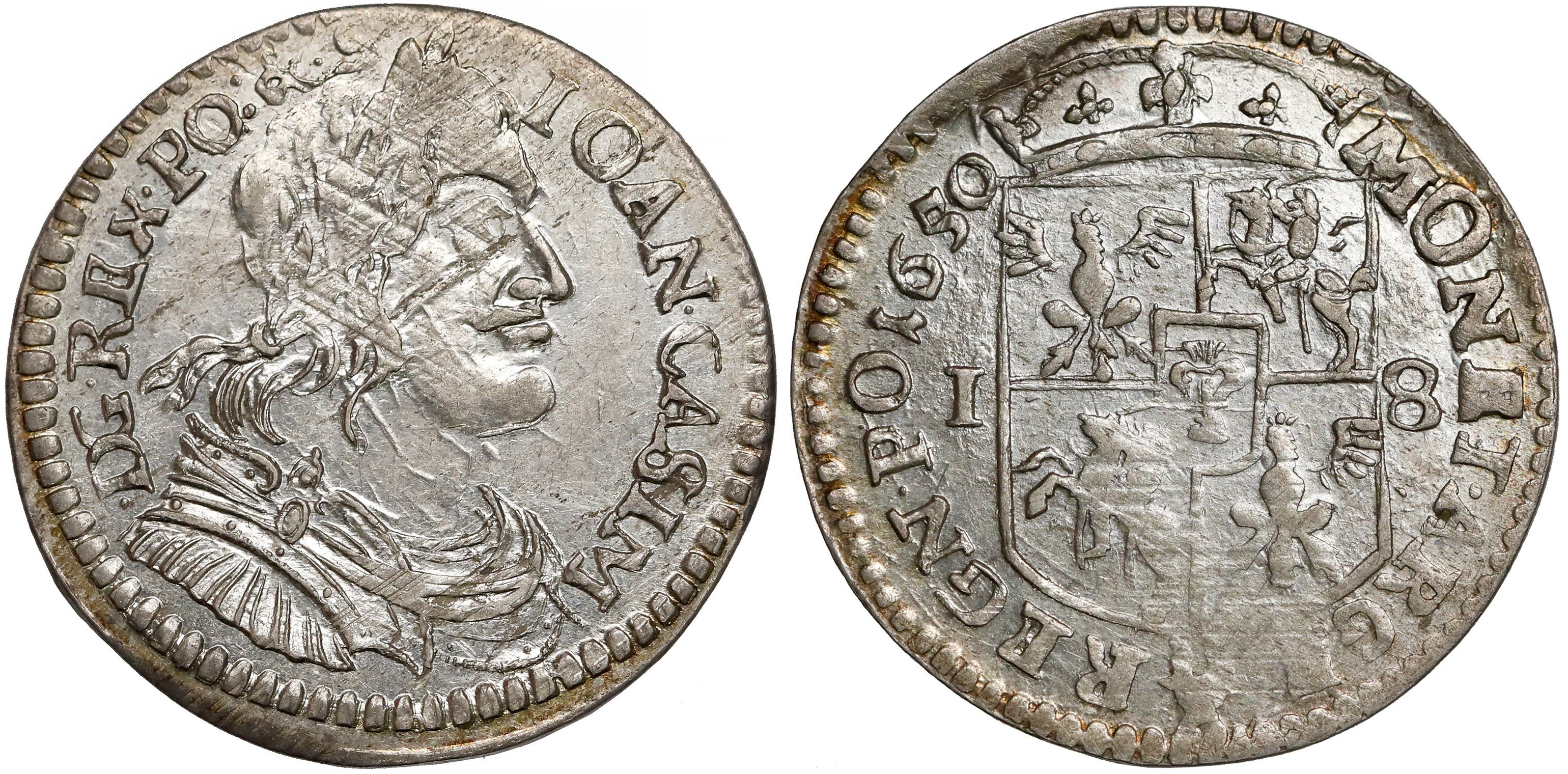
17th-century Polish coins minted in Wschowa

In 1512, a conference took place in Wschowa with the participation of representatives of Poland, Bohemia, Saxony, the Duchy of Pomerania and large Polish cities such as Kraków, Poznań and Gdańsk over an ongoing trade conflict with the city of Wrocław.

Since the mid-16th century, Wschowa was one of the centres of the Protestant Reformation in Poland. The Protestants took over the local parish church, however, by decree of King Sigismund III Vasa of 1602, it was restored to the Catholics, and a new Protestant church was built in 1604. In the early 17th century, a new Latin school was founded. Wschowa was a retreat for religious refugees from adjacent Lower Silesia during the Thirty Years' War. In the 1630s, starost Hieronim Radomicki founded the New Town for the refugees to the north of Wschowa. In the 17th century, Italian Niccolo Bacaralli established in Wschowa the first paint manufacture in Poland.

In the 18th century kings Augustus II the Strong and Augustus III of Poland often resided in Wschowa and the town was even called the "unofficial capital of Poland". The Royal Castle hosted meetings of Polish kings with foreign delegations and even sessions of the Senate of the Polish–Lithuanian Commonwealth were held in Wschowa. In 1737 a concordat between the Holy See and Poland was signed in Wschowa.

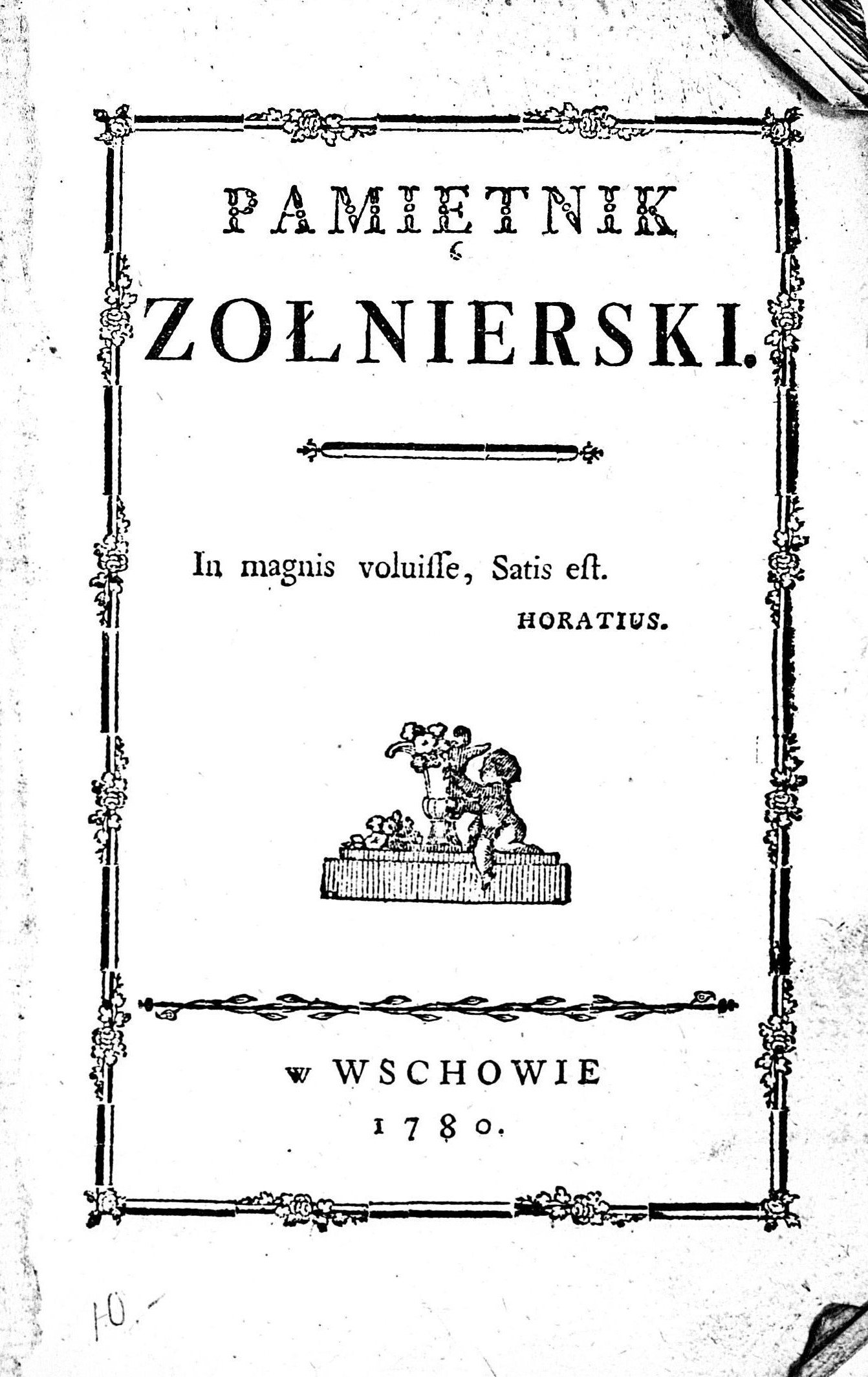
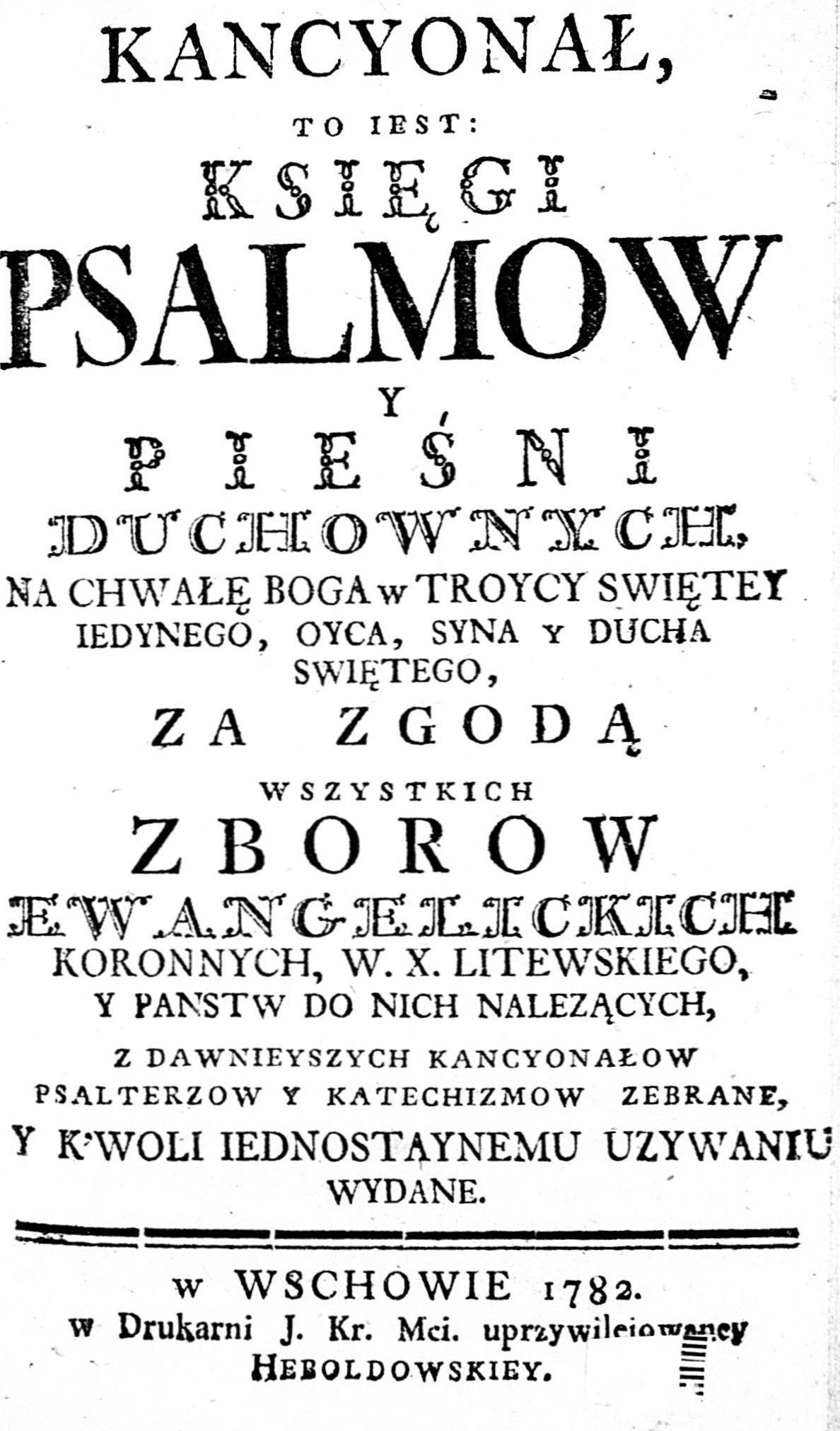
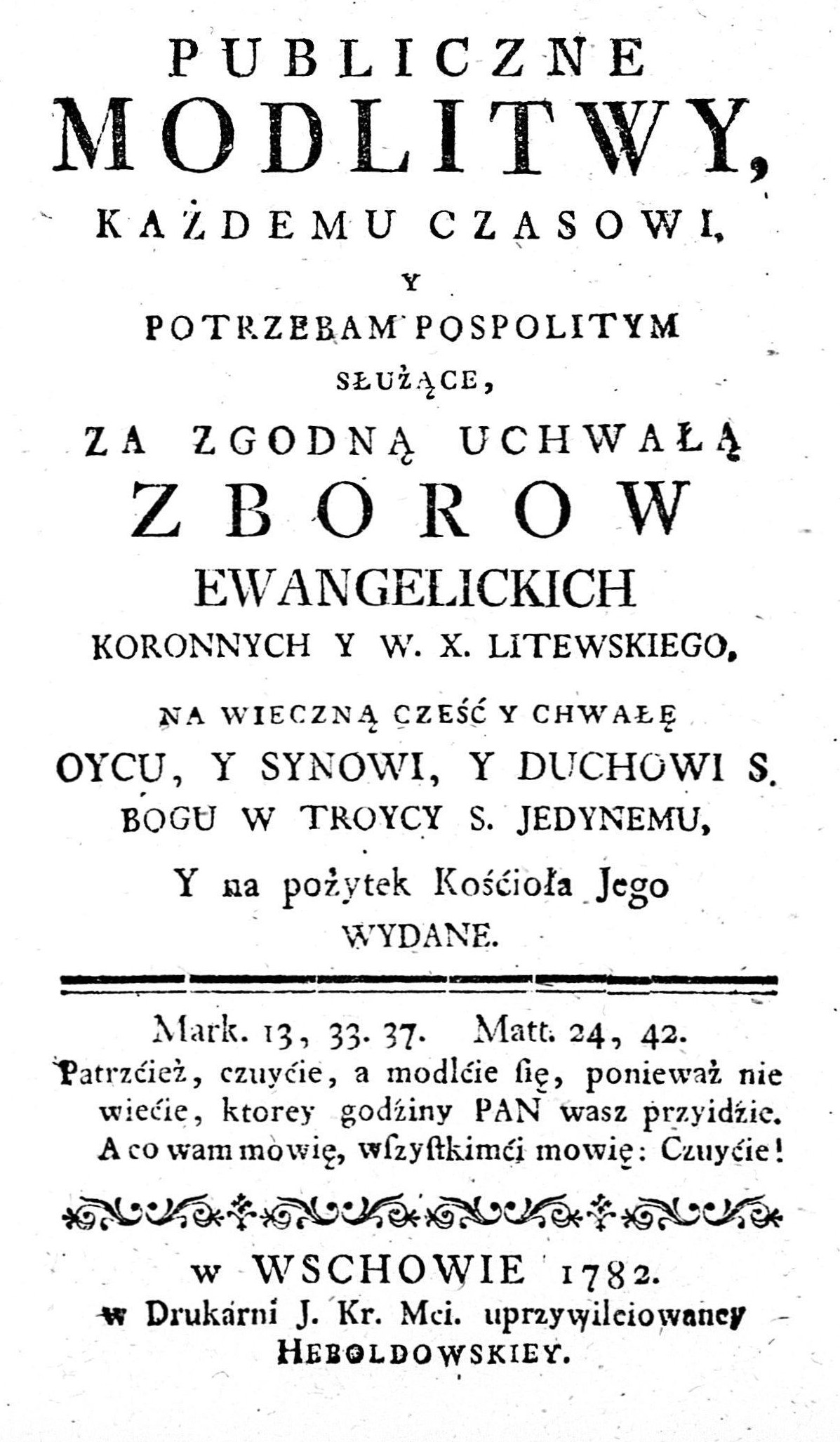
18th-century Polish books published in Wschowa

The Battle of Fraustadt occurred on February 3, 1706, during the Great Northern War, when Swedish forces defeated a joint army of the Polish–Lithuanian Commonwealth, Saxony and Russia. 2,719 inhabitants died to the Great Northern War plague outbreak in 1709. A Jesuit mission house at the former mint and a Jesuit college were opened in 1727 and 1729, respectively. The 6th Polish Infantry Regiment was stationed in the town. The marches and invasions of Russian and Prussian troops during the Seven Years' War destroyed the prosperity of Wschowa. After the suppression of the Jesuits in 1773, local nobility opposed the sale of the Jesuit college's property and library, thus it continued operating, now administered by the Cistercians. In 1794, Ignacy Raczyński was consecrated as Bishop of Poznań (later Primate of Poland) in Wschowa.

=== Late modern period ===
In the Second Partition of Poland in 1793, the town was annexed by the Kingdom of Prussia and incorporated into the province of South Prussia. After the successful Greater Poland uprising of 1806, it was regained by Poles and included within the Duchy of Warsaw, according to the Treaty of Tilsit. Jakob Walter, a Napoleonic soldier claimed to have passed through the town in 1806. He claims the town was used as a garrison and had 99 windmills.

Re-annexed by Prussia and made part of the initially semi-autonomous Grand Duchy of Posen (Poznań) from 1815 on, the town was again incorporated into the Prussian Province of Posen in 1848. A large sugar factory was established in 1880. In 1890, the town had a population of 6,873, of which 500 (7.3%) were Poles. In 1894, a secret Polish student organization named after poet Tomasz Zan was established, whose activities allowed the Polish language to survive in the town, despite the enforced policy of Germanization.

According to the 1919 Treaty of Versailles, Fraustadt remained a part of Germany as it had a majority of German citizens and formed the southernmost district of the Posen-West Prussia border province till 1 October 1938, when the province was dissolved. During the interwar period, the town stagnated, and some of its inhabitants emigrated to western Germany. It became a district center in the Province of Silesia till 1941, from 1941 to 1945 in the Province of Lower Silesia.

Fraustadt was one of the few areas within pre-war Germany attacked by the Polish military during the German invasion of Poland at the start of World War II in 1939. The town was occupied by the Red Army in February 1945. After the capitulation of Germany, remaining inhabitants were expelled in accordance with the Potsdam Agreement. The town became again part of Poland, although with a Soviet-installed communist regime, which stayed in power until the 1980s. In the following years, the Polish anti-communist resistance was active in Wschowa, including the local organizations Związek Tajnych Agentów (Secret Agents' Union) and Młodzieżowe Siły Zbrojne (Youth Armed Forces).

Initially the town was part of Okręg III (comprising present West Pomeranian and Lubusz provinces) between 1945 and 1946. German monuments were removed from the town by the new authorities, including the Protestant cemetery. Also, in 1968, the remains of the former German-Jewish cemetery were destroyed.

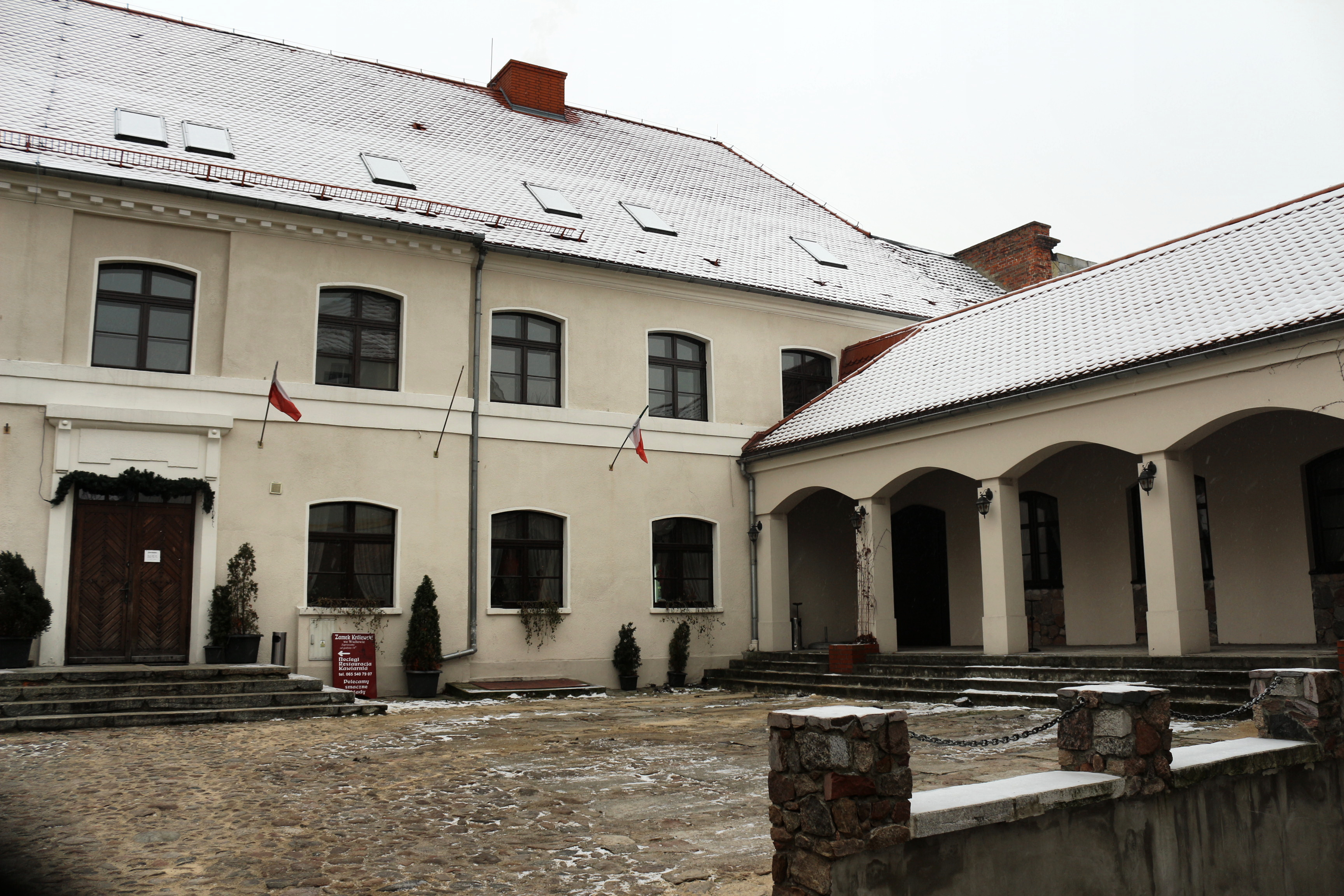
Polish Royal Castle

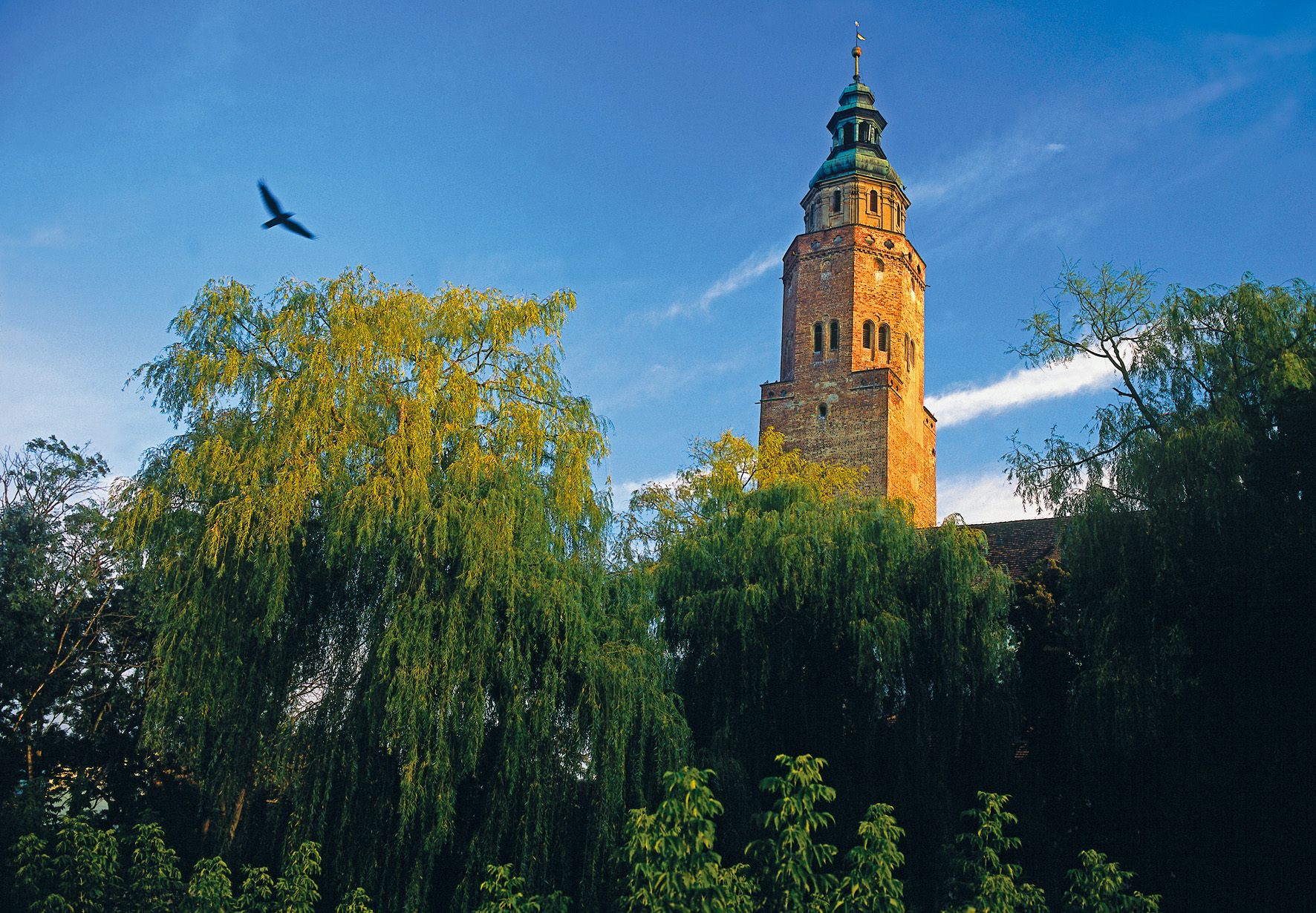
Saint Stanislaus church

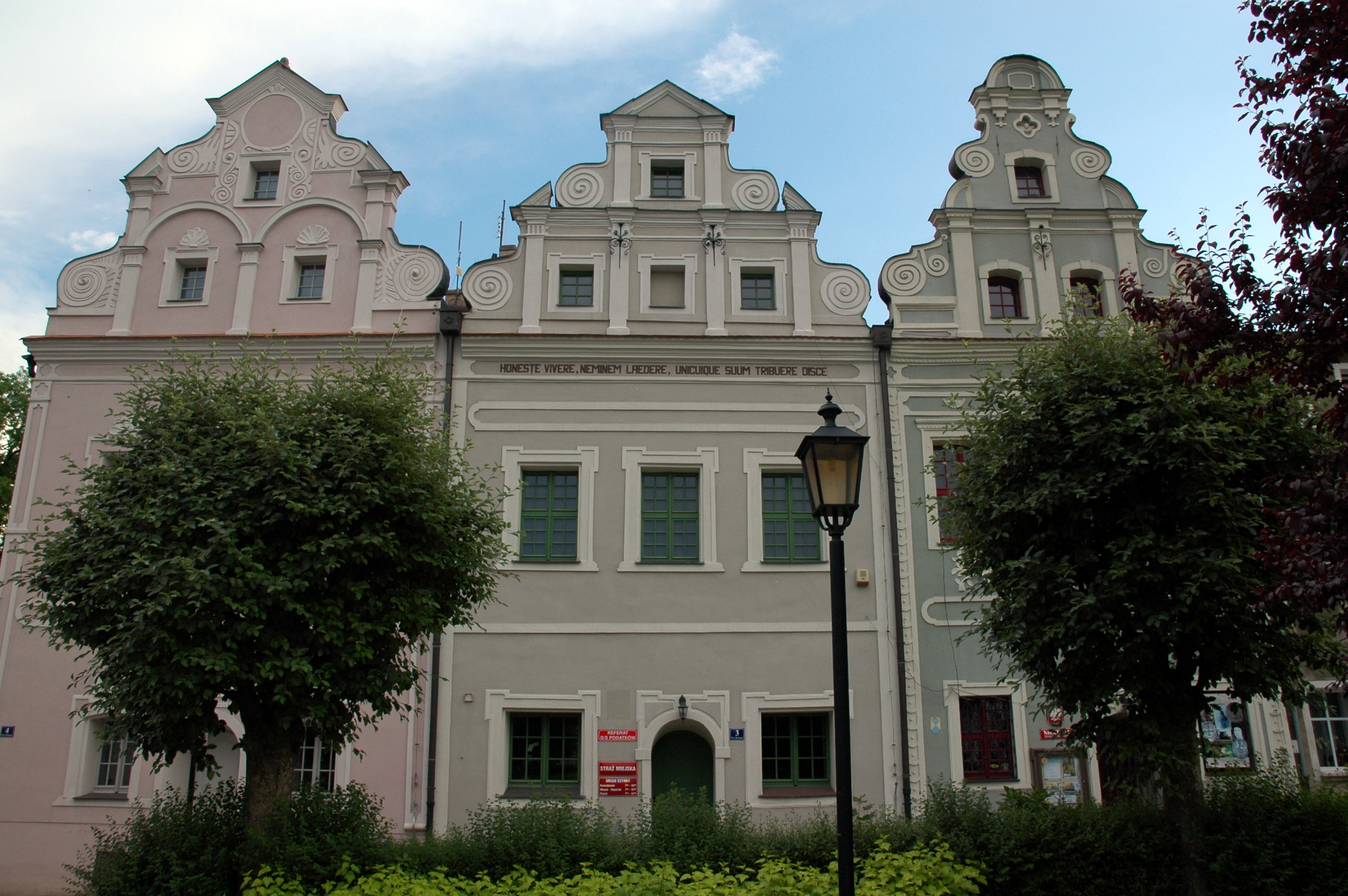
Baroque townhouses at the Castle Square (Plac Zamkowy)

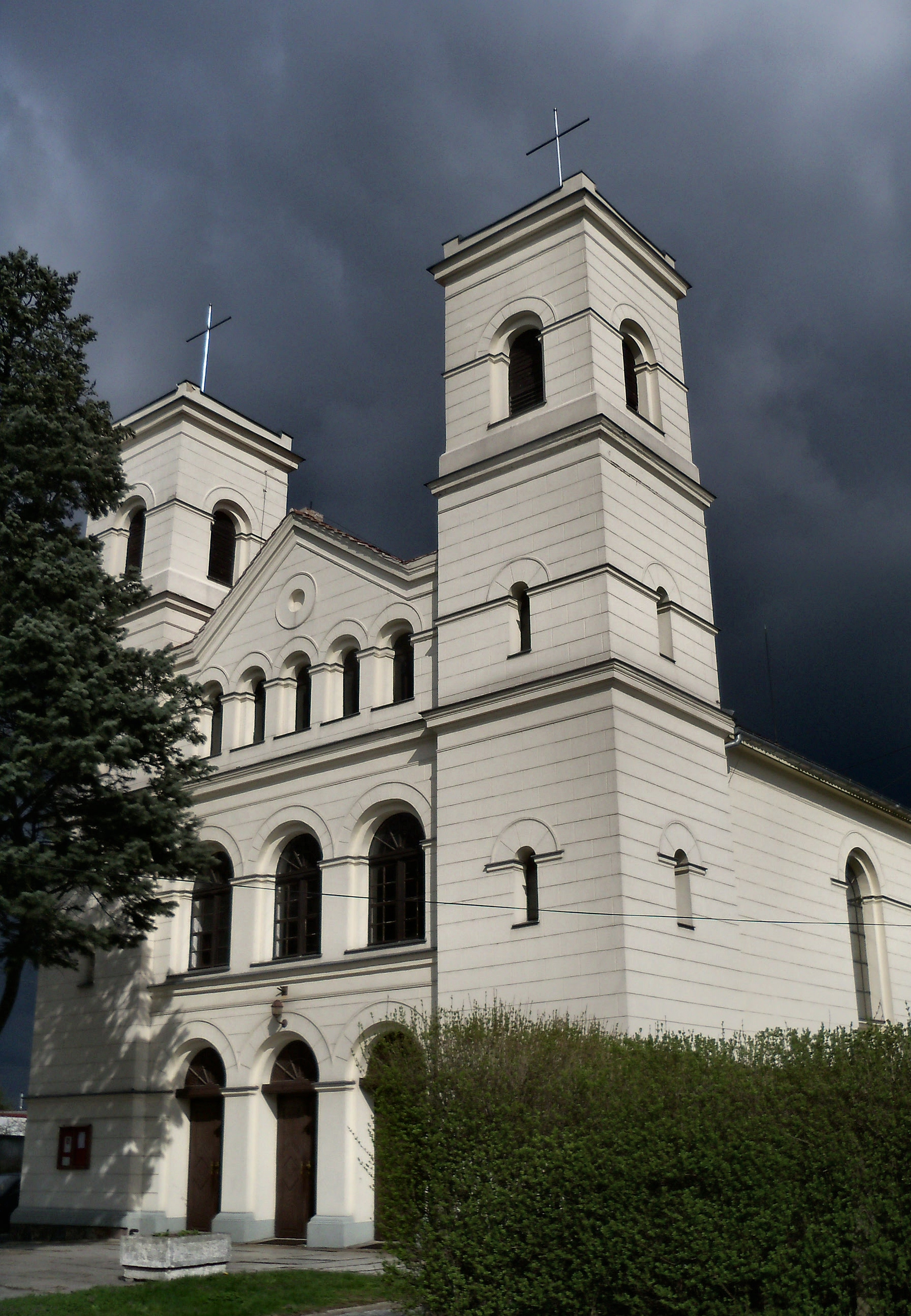
Holy Trinity church

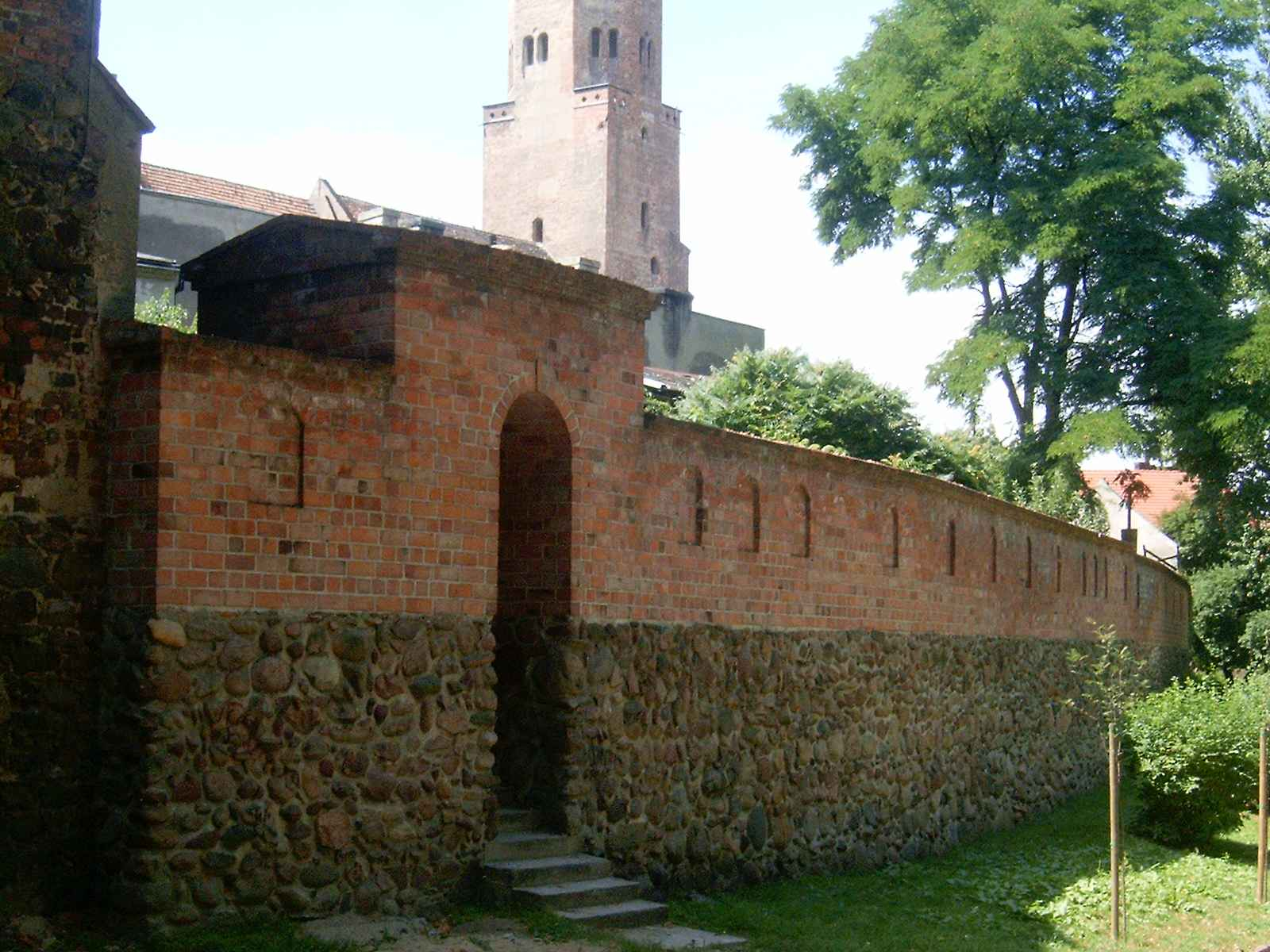
Medieval town walls

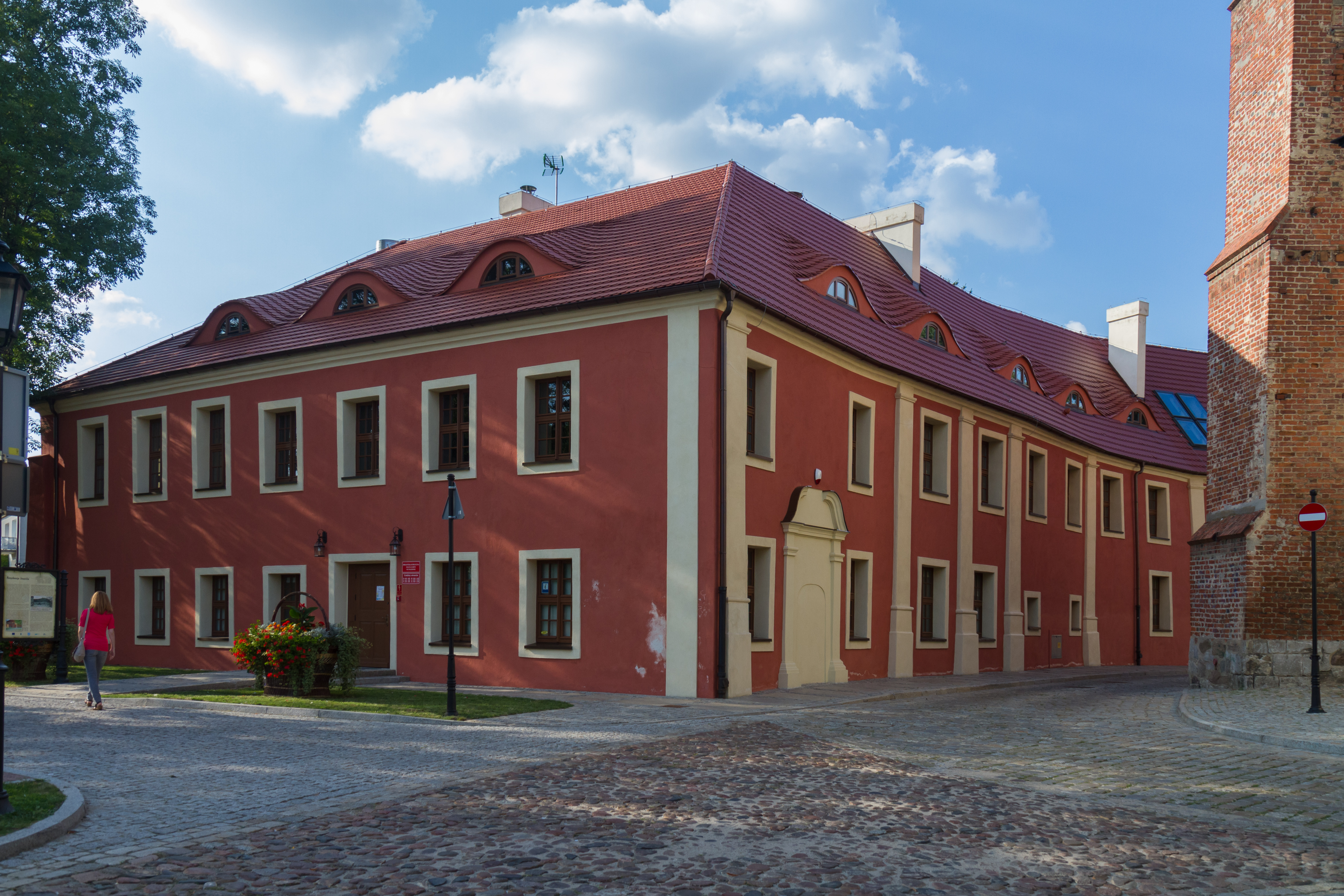
Former Jesuit college

=== Recent period ===
Later, Wschowa was a county (powiat) center in Poznan Voivodeship between 1946 and 1950, then in Zielona Gora Voivodeship between 1950 and 1975. It was finally a commune (gmina) center in Leszno Voivodeship between 1975 and 1999 before the creation of Lubusz province. It became again a county center after 24 years.

== Transport ==
Wschowa lies on national road 12.

Vovoideship road 305 passes through Wschowa.

Wschowa has a station on the Glogów-Leszno railway line.

== Sports ==
Wschowa hosted the 2010 edition of the Polish Sidecarcross Grand Prix.

== Notable people ==
- Valerius Herberger (1562–1627), German Lutheran theologian
- Melchior Teschner (1584–1635), German cantor, composer and theologian
- Andreas Gryphius (1616–1664), German Baroque poet, lived at Wschowa on and off
- Franciszek Antoni Kwilecki (1725–1794), Polish official, starost of Wschowa, deputy to the Great Sejm, which he opened, supporter and signatory of the Constitution of 3 May 1791
- Rajmund Oppeln-Bronikowski (1787–1869), Polish officer, November Uprising participant
- Rudolf Ewald Stier (1800–1862), German Protestant theologian
- Florian Stablewski (1841–1906), archbishop, Primate of Poland
- Leo Rosenberg (1879–1963), German jurist
- Fritz Thurm (1883–1937), German resistance fighter
- Alfred Fellisch (1884–1973), German politician
- Bronisław Geremek (1932–2008), historian and politician, attended school at Wschowa
- Waldy Dzikowski (born 1959), politician, born in Wschowa
- Grzegorz Król (born 1978), footballer
- Marcin Warcholak (born 1989), footballer

== Twin towns – sister cities ==
See twin towns of Gmina Wschowa.
