= Gloria, laus et honor =

Gregorian processional for Palm Sunday

Gloria, Laus et Honor is a Christian hymn composed and written by Theodulf of Orléans between 810 and 817, and sung as a processional for Palm Sunday, based on the story of Jesus's arrival in Jerusalem before his passion and death. It was most likely composed by Theodulph of Orléans in the early ninth century. The modern English hymn "All Glory, Laud and Honour" is based on a translation of this text.

== Text ==
Below are the words of the hymn as found in the Graduale Novum.

Refrain:

Glória, laus, et honor, tibi sit Rex Christe Redémptor:
cui pueríle decus prompsit Hosánna pium.

Verses:

Israel es tu Rex, Davídis et ínclyta proles:
nómine qui in Dómini, Rex benedícte venis. Glória, laus
Coetus in excélsis te laudat caélitus omnis,
et mortális homo, et cuncta creáta simul. Glória, laus
Plebs Hebraéa tibi cum palmis óbvia venit:
cum prece, voto, hymnis, ádsumus ecce tibi. Glória, laus
Hi tibi passúro solvébant múnia laudis:
nos tibi regnáti pángimus ecce melos. Glória, laus
Hi placuére tibi, pláceat devótio nostra:
Rex pie, Rex clemens, cui bona cuncta placent. Glória, laus

== Meter ==
The text is set in elegiac couplets, with each couplet comprising the traditional dactylic hexameter and dactylic pentameter. This use of this classical meter was uncommon in Christian hymn writing at the time.
