= Przyczyna Górna =

- Village
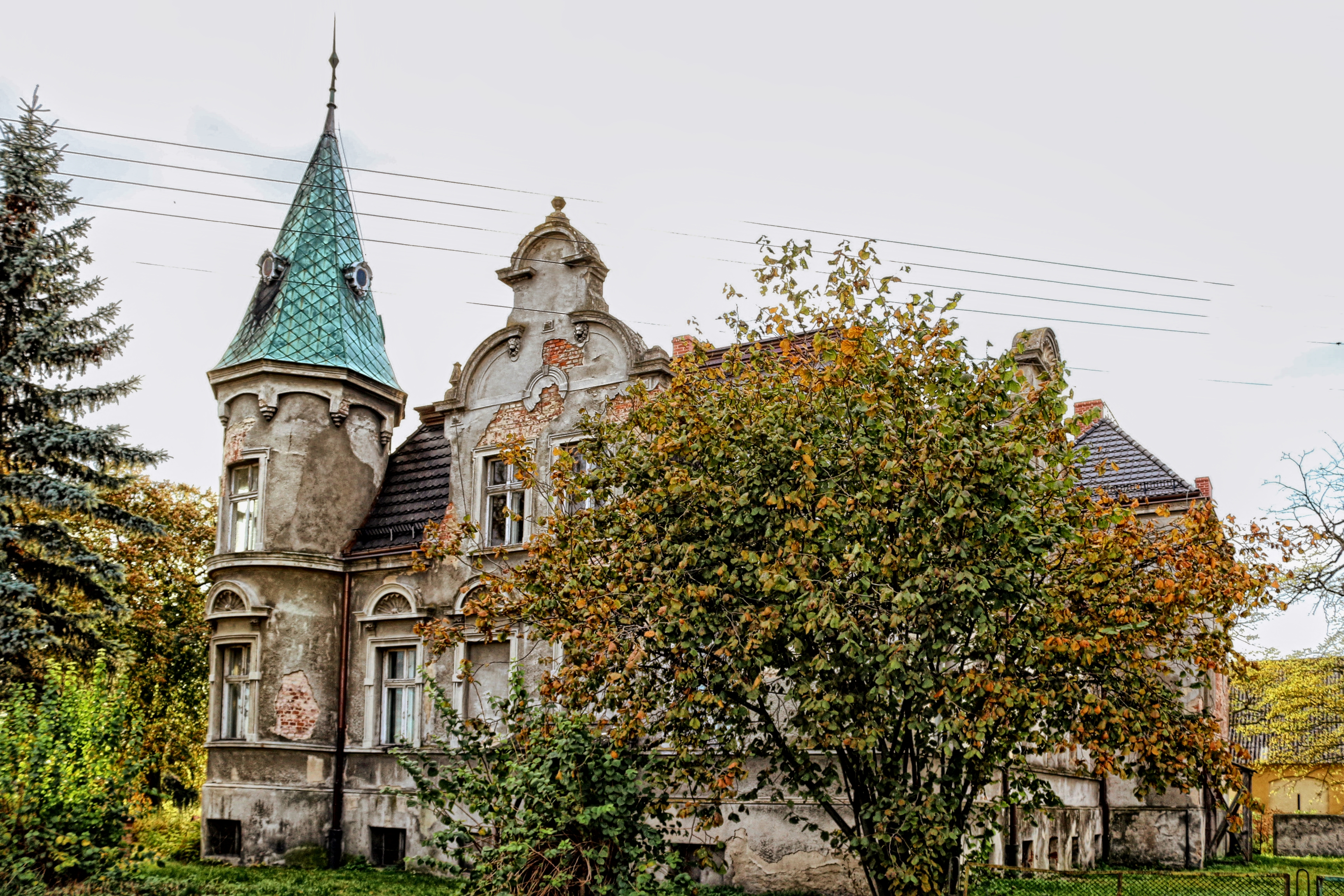
- Palace

- Location within Poland
- Coordinates: 51°48′N 16°16′E
- Country: Poland
- Voivodeship: Lubusz
- County: Wschowa
- Gmina: Wschowa

Przyczyna Górna [pʂɨˈt͡ʂɨna ˈɡurna] (German: Ober Pritschen) is a village in the administrative district of Gmina Wschowa, within Wschowa County, Lubusz Voivodeship, in western Poland. It lies approximately 3 km away from Wschowa, and 65 km away from Voivodeship capital Zielona Góra.

The earliest known written reference to the settlement of Przyczyna dates from 1210, when it appeared in a document issued by Władysław Odonic, Duke of Greater Poland. The settlement, recorded under the name ''Pretsino'', was mentioned in connection with the territorial boundaries of the castellany of Przemęt and a planned Cistercian monastery. Archaeological discoveries, including remains of an early medieval cemetery and settlement material dating from the 11th to 13th centuries, indicate that the area had been inhabited before its first surviving written mention.

On 1 October 1273, Przemysł II, Duke of Greater Poland, granted the village German law, a legal framework used in the medieval settlement and reorganisation of villages. A man named Walter was entrusted with organising the settlement. The village’s characteristic street layout, accompanied by elongated fields, reflects its medieval origins.

By 1327, the settlement had become divided into two parts, later known as Przyczyna Górna and Przyczyna Dolna. The development of both settlements was closely connected with the nearby town of Wschowa.

In 1345, King Casimir III the Great granted Przyczyna Górna to the town of Wschowa. This relationship was confirmed by King Władysław II Jagiełło in 1404. The village subsequently remained closely associated with the town’s economic interests, although some land was held by private owners.

In 1477, Przyczyna Górna was devastated by a major fire. In 1529, Wschowa expanded its holdings in the village by purchasing seven fields, known as ''łany'', from the Cistercian monastery in Przemęt.

The history of Przyczyna Górna remained closely connected with that of Wschowa, particularly through land ownership and the economic relationship between the town and the surrounding countryside. The village formed part of the historical borderland between Greater Poland and Lower Silesia, a region shaped by changing political and administrative boundaries.

Following the Second Partition of Poland in 1793, the area came under Prussian rule. After the Second World War, the village became part of Poland’s post-war western territories.
